= Stories Don't End =

Studio album by Dawes
- Released: April 9, 2013
- Genre: Folk rock
- Length: 51:10
- Label: HUB
- Producer: Jacquire King

Dawes chronology
Nothing Is Wrong (2011)	Stories Don't End (2013)	All Your Favorite Bands (2015)

Stories Don't End is the third studio album by American folk-rock band Dawes, released on April 9, 2013.

== Critical reception ==
Professional ratings
Review scores
Source	Rating
Allmusic	3.5/5 stars
American Songwriter	4/5 stars
Consequence of Sound	4/5 stars
Daily News	4/5 stars
Paste	7.2/10
PopMatters	6/10
Rolling Stone	4/5 stars
Uncut	8/10

Stories Don't End has received generally positive reception from most music critics. At Metacritic, they assign a weighted average score out of 100 to ratings and reviews from mainstream critics, the album received a Metascore of 76, based on 12 reviews.

James Christopher Monger of Allmusic alluded to how the release "barely registers upon the first spin (it's easy pop for the millennial generation), but if given the time to percolate, it produces a damn fine cup of coffee." At American Songwriter, Jim Beviglia affirmed that the album "is still a step forward, if only for the moments of off-the-cuff brilliance that result from all the ambitious effort." Consequence of Sound's Henry Hauser called the album "distinctively modern." Jim Farber of the Daily News declared that "there's a sure sense of composition that both recalls a classic era and speaks to any."

At Paste, Ryan Reed portrayed the album as "crisper and more overdubbed, sprawling a tad where the first two albums flowed seamlessly", but did note that this is "their most intricate music to date, full of colorful detours and surprising instrumental flavors". PopMatters' John Bergstrom portends that the release "probably will do nothing to diminish the band's appeal among the faithful", at the same instance, this "may be time to put a few bumps in the road." At Rolling Stone, David Fricke proclaimed this release to be a "quietly gripping, deceptively gleaming record." Bud Scoppa of Uncut evoked that "the sound is glossier, beefier, less wistful" on the release because the change in producers.

== Track listing ==
All tracks are written by Taylor Goldsmith, except where noted.

No.	Title	Writer(s)	Length
1.	"Just Beneath the Surface"		4:09
2.	"From a Window Seat" (additional percussion by Orpheo McCord, additional arranging by Blake Mills)		4:28
3.	"Just My Luck"		4:06
4.	"Someone Will"		3:33
5.	"Most People"		4:31
6.	"Something in Common" (additional arranging by Mills)		5:12
7.	"Hey Lover"	Blake Mills	2:47
8.	"Bear Witness"		4:18
9.	"Stories Don't End"		5:00
10.	"From the Right Angle" (additional arranging by Mills)		4:11
11.	"Side Effects"	Goldsmith, Mills	5:42
12.	"Just Beneath the Surface (Reprise)"		3:16

== Chart performance ==
The album debuted at No. 9 on the Top Rock Albums chart and No. 3 on the Folk Albums chart, selling 13,000 copies in the US in its first week.

Chart (2013)	Peak position
US Billboard 200	36
US Americana/Folk Albums (Billboard)	3
US Independent Albums (Billboard)	5
US Top Rock Albums (Billboard)	9
US Indie Store Album Sales (Billboard)	2

Airplay

Song	Chart	Position
"From A Window Seat"	Billboard Adult Alternative Songs	10
"Most People"	Billboard Adult Alternative Songs	16

== Personnel ==
Dawes

- Taylor Goldsmith - lead vocals, guitars
- Griffin Goldsmith - drums, background vocals, percussion
- Wylie Gelber - bass guitar
- Tay Strathairn - keyboards, background vocals
