= Passwords (album) =

Studio album by Dawes
- Released: June 22, 2018
- Genres: Folk rock; pop rock
- Length: 51:40
- Label: HUB
- Producer: Jonathan Wilson

Dawes chronology
We're All Gonna Die (2016)	Passwords (2018)	Good Luck with Whatever (2020)

Professional ratings
Aggregate scores
Source	Rating
Metacritic	74/100
Review scores
Source	Rating
AllMusic	4/5 stars
Classic Rock	3.5/5 stars
Mojo	4/5 stars
Paste	5.5/10
Uncut	3.5/5 stars
Variety	8.3/10

Passwords is the sixth studio album by American folk rock band Dawes. It was released on June 22, 2018.

== Background ==
Passwords saw the return of producer Jonathan Wilson, who had worked on the band's first two albums. According to the group, the record is "for and about the modern age: the relationships that fill it, the politics that divide it, and the small victories and big losses that give it shape." Dawes launched a marketing campaign for the album that encouraged fans to search for "passwords" posted throughout the internet. Once a password was found, it could be entered onto a page of the band's official website, where each part of the password represented a musical note. When entered correctly, these musical notes played various refrains from Dawes songs and unlocked exclusive content, including the singles "Never Gonna Say Goodbye" and "Telescope" as well as a Spotify playlist curated by Griffin Goldsmith.

== Track listing ==
All songs written by Taylor Goldsmith, except where noted.

No.	Title	Length
1.	"Living in the Future"	4:55
2.	"Stay Down" (Goldsmith, Jason Boesel, Blake Mills)	3:20
3.	"Crack the Case"	5:54
4.	"Feed the Fire" (Goldsmith, Boesel)	5:57
5.	"My Greatest Invention"	5:46
6.	"Telescope"	6:34
7.	"I Can't Love"	5:35
8.	"Mistakes We Should Have Made" (Goldsmith, Boesel)	3:48
9.	"Never Gonna Say Goodbye"	3:56
10.	"Time Flies Either Way"	5:55
Total length:		51:40

== Personnel ==
- Taylor Goldsmith – lead vocals, guitar, piano, synth, electric sitar
- Griffin Goldsmith – drums, percussion, background vocals
- Wylie Gelber – bass
- Lee Pardini – keyboards, piano, synth, vibraphone, kalimba, background vocals

Additional musicians

- Jonathan Wilson – guitar, drum machine, synth noise (tracks 1, 2, 4)
- Lucius (Jess Wolfe, Holly Laessig) – background vocals (track 8)
- Trevor Menear – slide guitar (track 3)
- Josh Johnson – alto sax (track 10)
- Peter Jacobson – cello (tracks 4, 5, 6, 8)
- Tom Lea – viola (tracks 4, 5, 6, 8)
- Luis Mascaro – violin (tracks 4, 5, 6, 8)
- Ina Veli – violin (tracks 4, 5, 6, 8)

== Charts ==
Chart (2018)	Peak position
US Billboard 200	52
