= We're All Gonna Die (album) =

Studio album by Dawes
- Released: September 16, 2016
- Genres: Folk rock, pop rock
- Length: 46:29
- Label: HUB
- Producer: Blake Mills

Dawes chronology
All Your Favorite Bands (2015)	We're All Gonna Die (2016)	Passwords (2018)

Singles from We're All Gonna Die
- 1. "When the Tequila Runs Out" Released: August 17, 2016; 2. "We're All Gonna Die" Released: September 7, 2016

We're All Gonna Die is the fifth studio album by American folk rock band Dawes. It was announced on August 17, 2016, with the release of the lead single, "When the Tequila Runs Out". The album was released on September 16, 2016. It was produced by former bandmate (when they performed as Simon Dawes) Blake Mills.

== Critical reception ==
Professional ratings
Aggregate scores
Source	Rating
Metacritic	77/100
Review scores
Source	Rating
AllMusic	4/5 stars
American Songwriter	3.5/5 stars
Paste Magazine	7.0/10
PopMatters	6/10 stars
Rolling Stone	3.5/5 stars

We're All Gonna Die received moderate praise upon release. At Metacritic, which assigns a normalized rating out of 100 to reviews from music critics, the album has received an average score of 77, indicating "generally favorable" reviews, based on 6 critics.

=== Accolades ===
Publication	Accolade	Year	Rank
American Songwriter	Top 50 Albums of 2016	2016	27

== Track listing ==
No.	Title	Writer(s)	Length
1.	"One of Us"	Taylor Goldsmith, Blake Mills	4:54
2.	"We're All Gonna Die"	Goldsmith	5:06
3.	"Roll with the Punches"	Goldsmith, Mills	4:25
4.	"Picture of a Man"	Goldsmith, Jason Boesel	4:21
5.	"Less than Five Miles Away"	Goldsmith, Mills	4:58
6.	"Roll Tide"	Boesel, Mills	5:30
7.	"When the Tequila Runs Out"	Goldsmith, Boesel, Mills	4:46
8.	"For No Good Reason"	Goldsmith, Mills	4:22
9.	"Quitter"	Goldsmith, Mills	3:51
10.	"As If By Design"	Goldsmith	4:16

== Personnel ==
=== Dawes ===
- Taylor Goldsmith – vocals, guitars, pianet (2), slide guitar (7)
- Griffin Goldsmith – drums, vocals, percussion (3, 4, 5, 7, 8, 9), lead vocals (6)
- Wylie Gelber – bass, Kee bass (8)
- Lee Pardini – piano (2, 5, 6, 8, 10), Ace Tone (2, 5, 7, 8), pianet (3, 5, 7), Juno (4, 8), clavinet (1, 9), organ (4), vocals

=== Additional Musicians ===
- Blake Mills – guitars (1, 3, 5, 7, 8, 9), vocals (2, 6, 7, 8, 9), drum programming (4), bass (5), glockenspiel (7), slide guitar (8), Korg MS-20 (9)
- Rob Moose – strings (2, 6, 10)
- Jim James – vocals (2, 7)
- Mandy Moore – vocals (4)
- Lucius (Jess Wolf & Holly Laessig) – vocals (4)
- Jim Keltner – MPC (7)
- Brittany Howard – vocals (7)
- Will Oldham – vocals (7)
- Nate Walcott – trumpet (10)

(*Jim James appears courtesy of Capitol Music Group) (*Brittany Howard appears courtesy of ATO Records)

== Charts ==
Chart (2016)	Peak position
US Billboard 200	42

Airplay

Song	Chart	Position
"When the Tequila Runs Out"	Billboard Adult Alternative Songs	5
"Roll with the Punches"	Billboard Adult Alternative Songs	23
