= All Your Favorite Bands =

Studio album by Dawes
- Released: June 2, 2015
- Studio: Woodland (Nashville, Tennessee)
- Genre: Folk rock
- Length: 47:51
- Label: HUB
- Producer: David Rawlings

Dawes chronology
Stories Don't End (2013)	All Your Favorite Bands (2015)	We're All Gonna Die (2016)

Professional ratings
Review scores
Source	Rating
AllMusic	4.5/5 stars

All Your Favorite Bands is the fourth studio album by American folk-rock band Dawes, released on June 2, 2015.

== Critical reception ==
All Your Favorite Bands currently holds a score of 71 out of 100 at Metacritic based on 12 critic reviews, indicating generally favorable reviews.

== Commercial performance ==
The album debuted at No.1 on the Billboard Folk Albums chart, No. 4 on Top Rock Albums, selling 13,000 copies in its first week.

== Track listing ==
All songs written by Taylor Goldsmith, except where noted.

No.	Title	Length
1.	"Things Happen"	4:03
2.	"Somewhere Along the Way"	5:39
3.	"Don't Send Me Away"	4:54
4.	"All Your Favorite Bands" (Goldsmith, Jonny Fritz)	3:35
5.	"I Can't Think About It Now"	6:15
6.	"To Be Completely Honest"	4:43
7.	"Waiting For Your Call"	4:09
8.	"Right On Time"	4:48
9.	"Now That It's Too Late, Maria"	9:45

== Personnel ==
Dawes

- Taylor Goldsmith – lead vocals, guitar
- Griffin Goldsmith – drums, backing vocals, percussion
- Wylie Gelber – bass
- Tay Strathairn – keyboards, backing vocals

Additional Musicians

- Richard Bennett – acoustic guitar (tracks 1,4,5)
- Paul Franklin – steel guitar (tracks 4,7)
- David Rawlings – guitar, backing vocals (tracks 2,4)
- Gillian Welch – backing vocals (track 5)
- Ann McCrary – backing vocals (track 5)
- Frieda McCrary – backing vocals (track 5)
- Regina McCrary – backing vocals, tambourine (track 5)

== Chart performance ==
Chart (2011)	Peak position
US Billboard 200	37
US Americana/Folk Albums (Billboard)	1
US Independent Albums (Billboard)	4
US Top Rock Albums (Billboard)	4
US Indie Store Album Sales (Billboard)	3

Airplay

Song	Chart	Position
"Things Happen"	Billboard Adult Alternative Songs	6
"All Your Favorite Bands"	Billboard Adult Alternative Songs	19
