= Middle Brother (album) =

Studio album by Middle Brother
- Released: March 1, 2011
- Studio: Playground Sound, Nashville
- Genre: Folk rock, roots rock
- Length: 48:57
- Label: Partisan Records
- Producer: Adam Landry

Middle Brother is the debut album by the folk-rock band Middle Brother, released on March 1, 2011 on Partisan Records. The band members, all of whom had been in their own bands before forming Middle Brother, described the band's debut album as a "one-off" that they didn't want to take precedence over their original projects.

== Background and recording ==
The album's songs, along with 10 others that were not included on it, were recorded at Adam Landry's home studio Playground Sound in Nashville, Tennessee over a week-long period. The album also contains songs from each of Middle Brother's members' other bands that never made it onto their previous groups' albums. In March 2010, Middle Brother, then known as "MG&V", played their first show at SXSW, where they said they would release an album soon, depending on their bands' tour schedules.

== Critical reception ==
Professional ratings
Aggregate scores
Source	Rating
Metacritic	(76%)
Review scores
Source	Rating
AllMusic	3.5/5 stars
Rolling Stone	3.5/5 stars
PopMatters	7/10 stars
Robert Christgau	(A−)
Spin	(6/10)
The A.V. Club	(B+)
The Austin Chronicle	3/5 stars
American Songwriter	4/5 stars

The album received mainly positive reviews from critics; for instance, Doug Freeman praised the way that "McCauley's caustic growl gets softened by the smoother tenors of Goldsmith and Vasquez." Ken Tucker also reviewed the album favorably in an article written for NPR, in which he compared Middle Brother to Crosby, Stills and Nash – the collaboration between David Crosby, Stephen Stills and Graham Nash that was originally conceived as a one-time collaboration. Tucker stated that the similarities lie in how each member helps the other achieve a musical effect the other wants.

== Track listing ==
1. "Daydreaming" (McCauley)
2. "Blue Eyes" (Vasquez)
3. "Thanks For Nothing" (Goldsmith)
4. "Middle Brother" (McCauley, Goldsmith, Jonny Corndawg)
5. "Theater" (Vasquez)
6. "Portland" (Replacements cover)
7. "Wilderness" (Goldsmith)
8. "Me Me Me" (McCauley)
9. "Someday" (Vasquez)
10. "Blood and Guts" (Goldsmith)
11. "Mom and Dad" (McCauley)
12. "Million Dollar Bill" (Goldsmith)

== Personnel ==
- Jonny Corndawg – vocals on "Middle Brother"
- Taylor Goldsmith – vocals
- Jason Isbell – guitar on "Blood and Guts"
- Adam Landry – producer
- John J. McCauley III – vocals
- Matthew Vasquez – vocals
