= Middle Brother (band) =

American rock band

- Genres: Indie folk, folk rock, alternative country
- Years active: 2010–present
- Labels: Partisan Records
- Members: John J. McCauley III; Taylor Goldsmith; Matt Vasquez
- Website: http://www.middlebrother.com

Middle Brother is an American rock band consisting of songwriters and musicians John J. McCauley III of Deer Tick, Taylor Goldsmith of Dawes, and Matt Vasquez of Delta Spirit. They first came together in 2009, and played their first show at the 2010 SXSW film conference and festival at the Ale House in Austin, Texas, where they performed under the moniker "MG&V" in an unannounced appearance. The band played their first official show at The Troubadour in Los Angeles, California on December 20, 2010 under the official name of Middle Brother.

Middle Brother released their self-titled debut album on March 1, 2011.

On July 26, 2021 the band played a set at the Newport Folk Festival. They opened with a cover of a Traveling Wilburys song and then played all of the tracks from Middle Brother's 2011 album.

== Discography ==
- Middle Brother (2011)
