= Good Luck with Whatever =

Studio album by Dawes
- Released: October 2, 2020
- Studios: RCA Studio A (Nashville, Tennessee)
- Genre: Rock
- Length: 39:55
- Label: Rounder
- Producer: Dave Cobb

Dawes chronology
Passwords (2018)	Good Luck with Whatever (2020)	Misadventures of Doomscroller (2022)

Singles from Good Luck With Whatever
- 1. "Who Do You Think You're Talking To?" Released: July 22, 2020; 2. "St. Augustine At Night" Released: August 10, 2020; 3. "Still Feel Like A Kid" Released: August 28, 2020

Good Luck with Whatever is the seventh studio album by Dawes, released on October 2, 2020 via Rounder Records.

== Track listing ==
All songs written by Taylor Goldsmith, except where noted.

No.	Title	Length
1.	"Still Feel Like a Kid"	3:12
2.	"Good Luck with Whatever"	4:45
3.	"Between the Zero and the One"	4:50
4.	"None of My Business"	4:04
5.	"St. Augustine at Night"	5:13
6.	"Who Do You Think You're Talking To?" (Goldsmith, Blake Mills, Matt Sweeney)	3:19
7.	"Didn't Fix Me"	5:32
8.	"Free as We Wanna Be"	3:16
9.	"Me Especially" (Goldsmith, Jim James)	5:44

== Charts ==
Chart (2020)	Peak position
US Top Rock Albums (Billboard)	44
