= FireAid =

January 2025 benefit concert for Southern California fire victims

- Benefit concert by the Annenberg Foundation
- Location: Inglewood, California, US
- Venue: Intuit Dome; Kia Forum
- Date: January 30, 2025
- Website: Official website

FireAid was a two-venue benefit concert and music-based fundraising initiative that took place in Inglewood, California, United States, on January 30, 2025. The event, organized by the Annenberg Foundation, raised funds to help those affected by the January 2025 Southern California wildfires, as well as funds to help prevent future wildfires in the area.

Several of the people involved in the production of the event were directly affected by the fires, including producer Tim Sexton, lead mixing engineer Bob Clearmountain, and technical director Eric Becker.

== Performers ==
Most of the performers at the event had some connection to the Greater Los Angeles area.

The concert ran for six hours. Setlist:

=== Intuit Dome ===
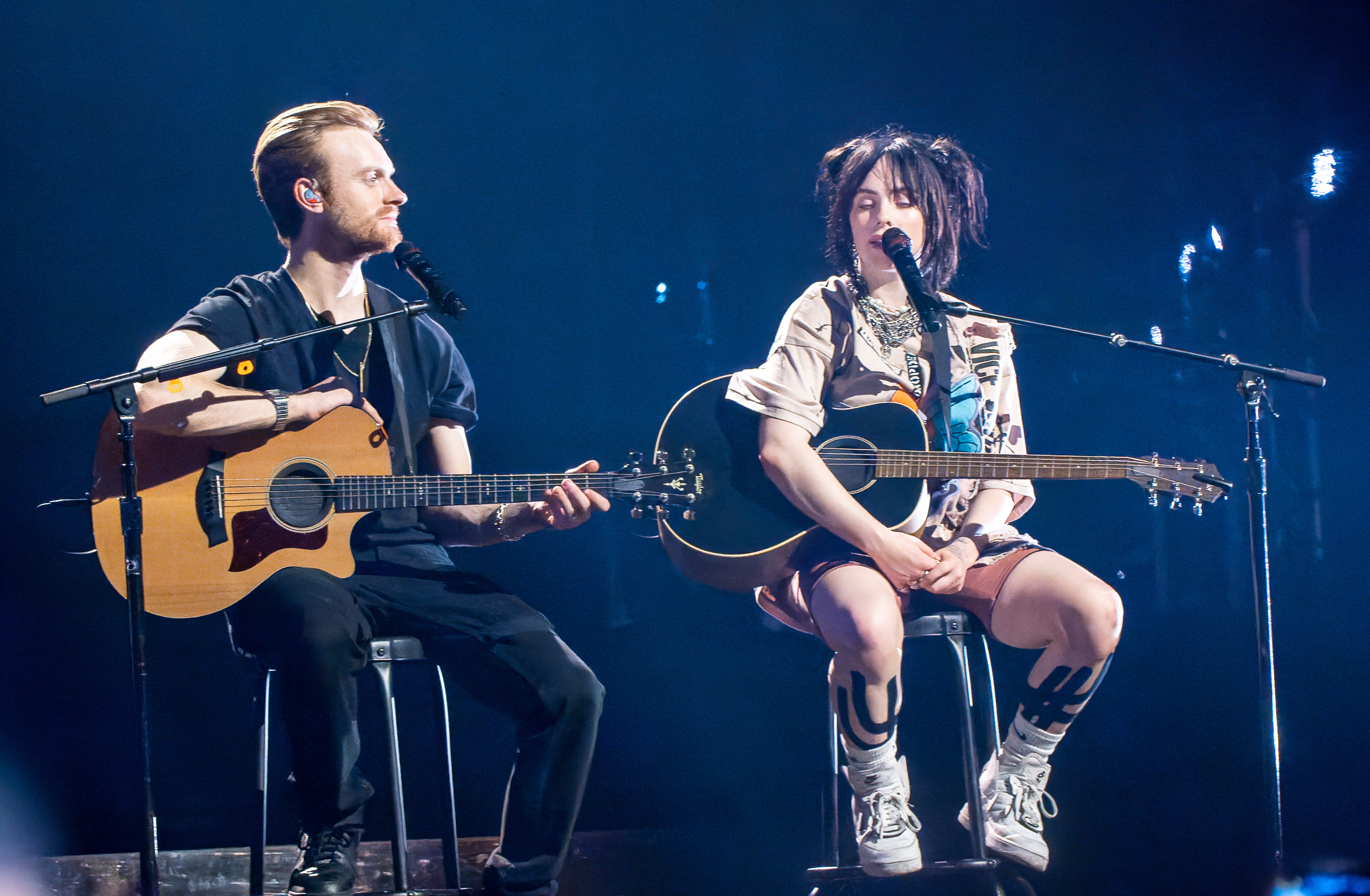
Finneas O'Connell and Billie Eilish in 2022

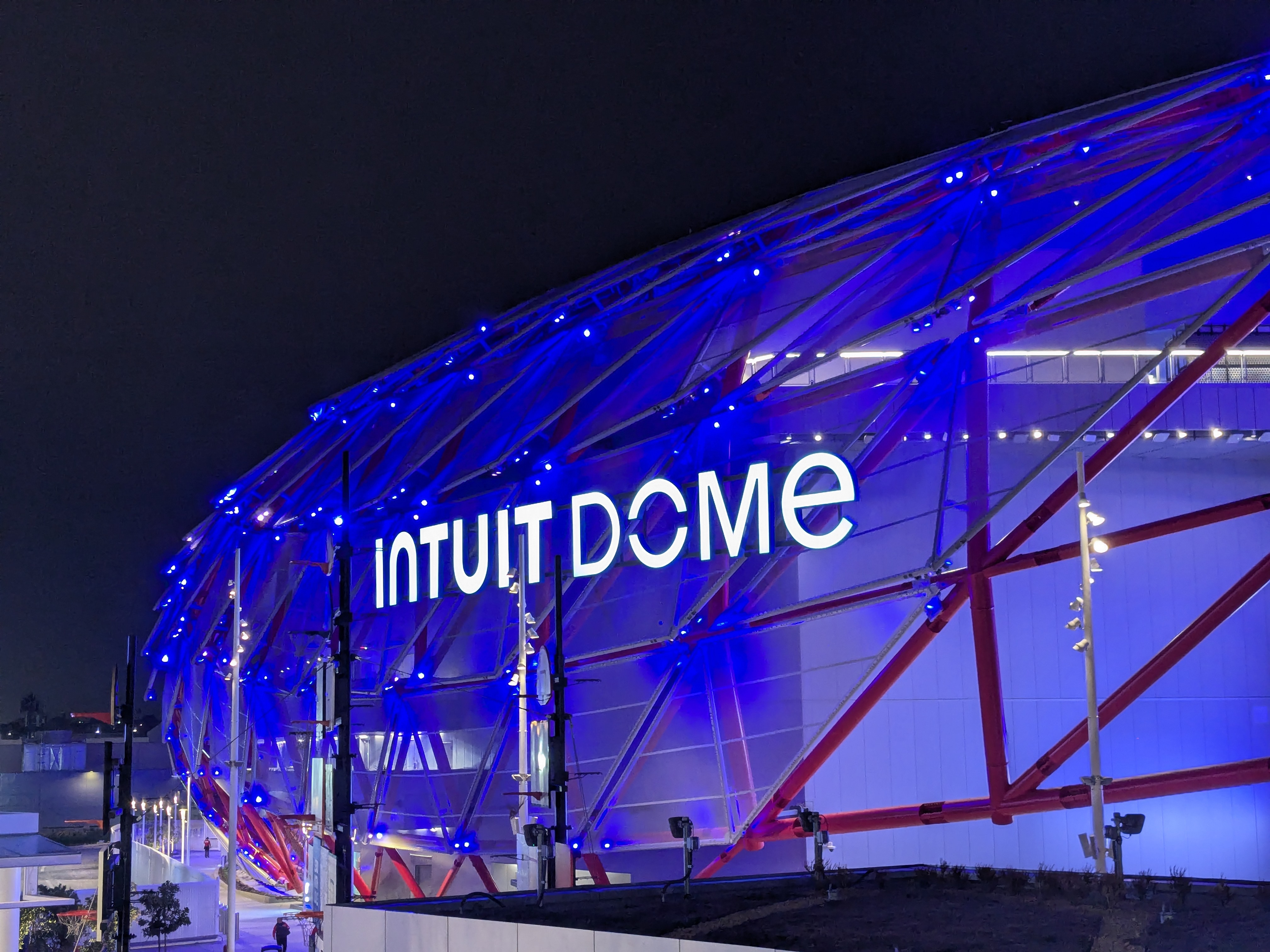
The Intuit Dome

- Billie Eilish with Finneas O'Connell ("Wildflower", "The Greatest", "Birds of a Feather")
- Earth, Wind & Fire ("That's the Way of the World", "Shining Star", "September")
- Gracie Abrams with Aaron Dessner ("I Love You, I'm Sorry", "A Long December")
- Jelly Roll ("I Am Not Okay", "Hollywood Nights" (with Travis Barker))
- Katy Perry ("Rise" (with the Pasadena Chorale), "Roar", "California Gurls")
- Lady Gaga ("Shallow", "Always Remember Us This Way", "All I Need Is Time")
- Lil Baby ("So Sorry", "Emotionally Scarred")
- Olivia Rodrigo ("Drivers License", "Deja Vu")
- Peso Pluma ("La Bebé (Remix)")
- Rod Stewart ("Forever Young", "Maggie May", "People Get Ready")
- Stevie Wonder ("Love's in Need of Love Today", "Superstition" (with Sting), "Higher Ground" (with Sting and Flea))
- Sting ("Message in a Bottle", "Driven to Tears", "Fragile")
- Tate McRae ("You Broke Me First", "Don't Dream It's Over")

Additional appearances included Samuel L. Jackson, Quinta Brunson, and Miles Teller, who each introduced locals who lost their homes in the wildfires (Teller also lost his home in the Palisades Fire), and Jimmy Kimmel.

=== Kia Forum ===
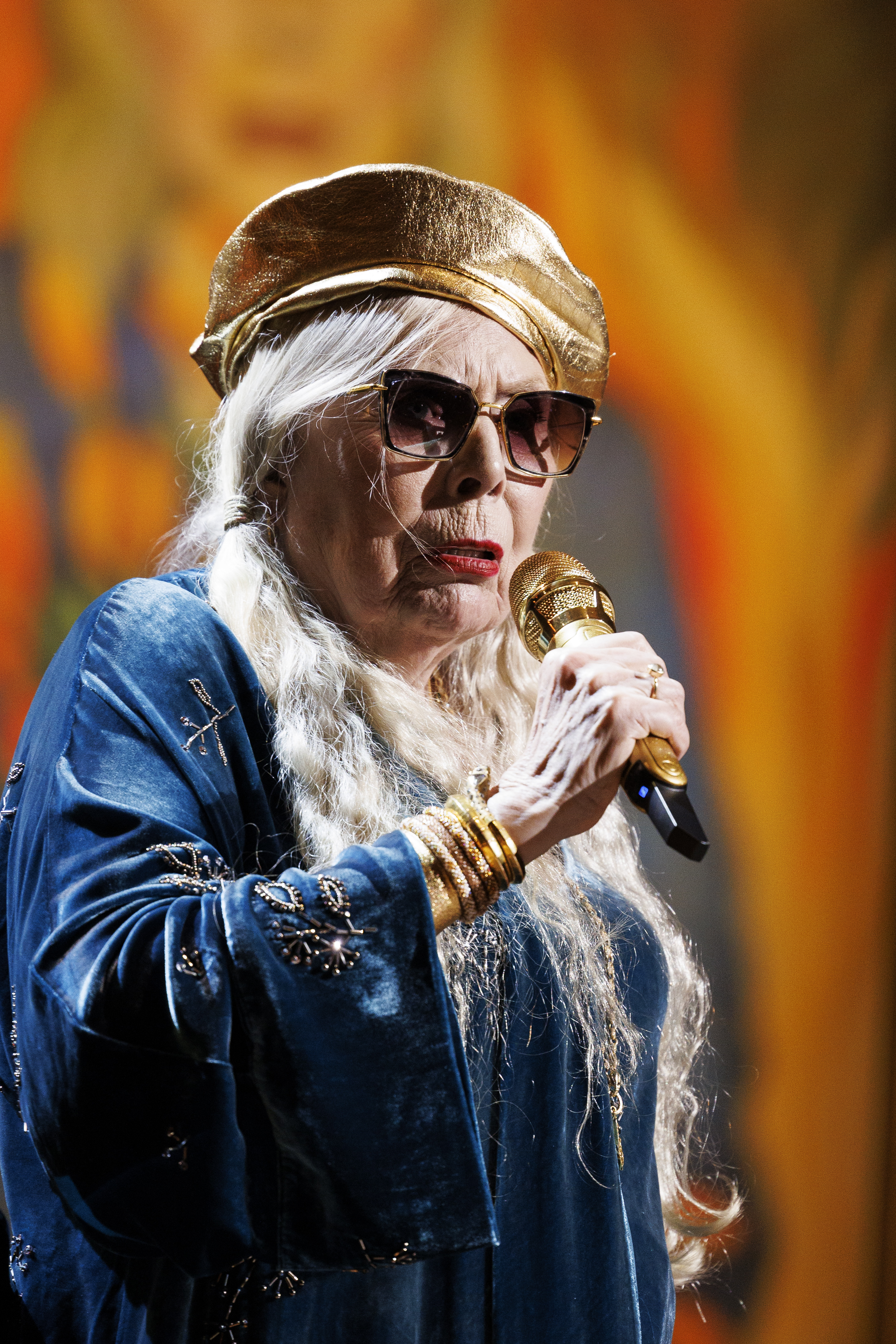
Joni Mitchell in 2023

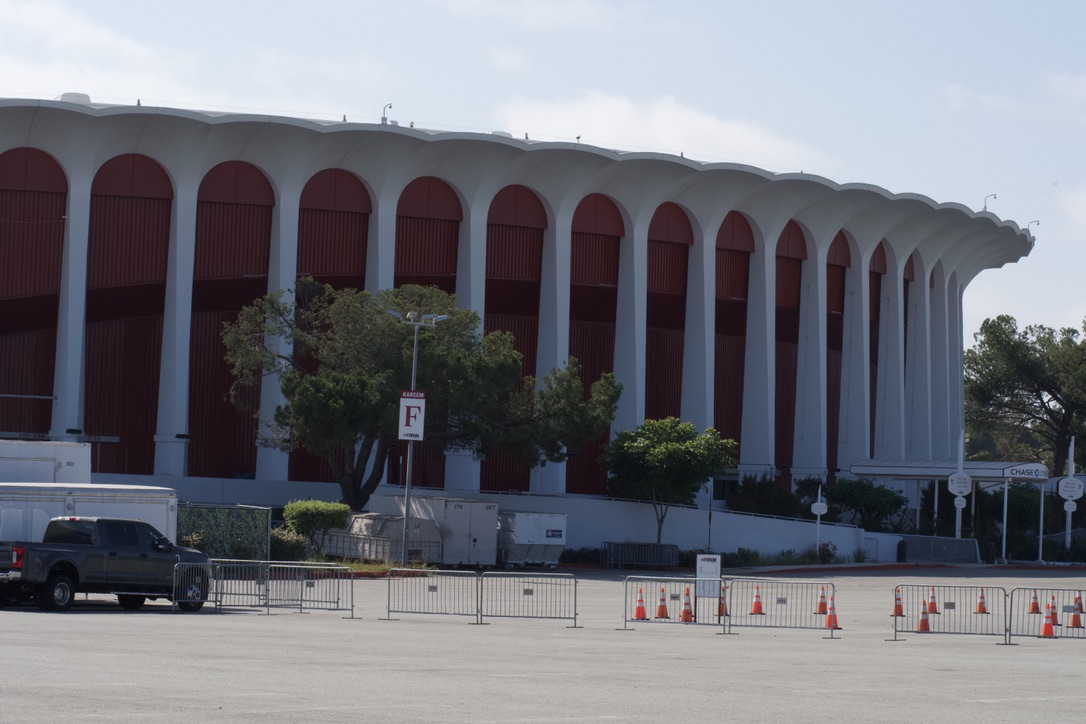
The Kia Forum

- Alanis Morissette ("Hand in My Pocket", "Thank U")
- Anderson .Paak with Free Nationals and Sheila E. ("Put Me Thru", "Come Down", "Still D.R.E." (with Dr. Dre) and "California Love" (with Dr. Dre))
- Dawes ("Time Spent in Los Angeles", "For What It's Worth (with Stephen Stills and Mike Campbell) and "Teach Your Children" (with Graham Nash and Stephen Stills))
- Green Day ("Last Night on Earth" (with Billie Eilish), "Still Breathing", "When I Come Around")
- John Mayer ("Neon", "Gravity", "Free Fallin'")
- Joni Mitchell ("Both Sides, Now")
- Nirvana tribute with surviving members Dave Grohl, Krist Novoselic and Pat Smear ("Breed" (with St. Vincent), "School" (with Kim Gordon), "Territorial Pissings" (with Joan Jett), "All Apologies" (with Violet Grohl and Kim Gordon)) (unannounced surprise)
- No Doubt ("Just a Girl", "Don't Speak", "Spiderwebs")
- Pink ("What About Us", "Me and Bobby McGee", "Babe I'm Gonna Leave You")
- Red Hot Chili Peppers ("Dani California", "Californication", "Black Summer", "Under the Bridge")
- Stevie Nicks ("Stand Back", "Landslide", "Edge of Seventeen")
- The Black Crowes ("Remedy", "Have You Ever Seen the Rain?" (with John Fogerty and Shane Fogerty) and "Going to California" (with Slash))

Additional appearances included Billy Crystal, who lost his home in the Palisades Fire.

Dave Matthews was originally scheduled to perform with John Mayer but canceled due to a family illness.

== Fundraising ==
The Annenberg Foundation distributed contributions to FireAid, whose organizers set up a 501(c)(3) for the purpose. Steve Ballmer and his wife Connie pledged to match all donations made during the live event. The Ballmers' offer was later extended to match donations made during streams for the next year. During his segment, Billy Crystal noted that band U2 pledged $1 million.

Proceeds from donations, sales, and sponsorships exceeded $100 million.

== Online streaming partners ==
Following the event, streaming partners extended on-demand access to the broadcast for a full year. The concert was broadcast live on many different streaming platforms and radio stations around the world including:

=== Video streaming platforms ===
- Prime Video/Amazon Live
- Apple TV+
- Disney+/Hulu
- Max/Crave
- Netflix/Tudum
- Paramount+/Pluto TV
- Peacock
- YouTube
- DirecTV app
- DirecTV Stream
- FanDuel Sports Network app

=== Music streaming platforms ===
- Spotify
- Amazon Music
- Apple Music
- SoundCloud
- YouTube Music

=== Radio stations ===
- All 860+ iHeartRadio stations
- Life with John Mayer

=== News stations ===
- KTLA+
- NBC News Now
- CBS News 24/7

=== Social media platforms ===
- Facebook
- Instagram
- TikTok
- X
- Twitch (Amazon Music)

=== Concert streaming platforms ===
- VEEPS

=== Movie theaters ===
- AMC Theatres
- Regal Cinemas

== Controversy ==
Six months after the concert was held, some victims of the fires told the media that they had not received any money from the concert organizers. The Annenberg Foundation responded:

As a newly formed 501c3, FireAid does not have the capability to make direct payments to individuals and that was never the plan. To deliver aid into the community, we partnered directly with trusted local nonprofits who have the capacity to reach the communities in need, to provide food security, housing, and resources for schools. Each dollar was intended for the community, and a stipulation of the funds was that not a single dollar was spent on administrative costs.

On July 31, 2025, Representative Kevin Kiley (CA-03) posted on X about this issue and requested the Department of Justice to investigate. In response, FireAid hired a law firm, Latham & Watkins to review the funds sent. Their report found no misrepresentation, fraud, or otherwise improper management or use of funds. The House Judiciary Committee released an interim report in January 2026. According to the Committee, FireAid disbursed at least $75 million to 118 non-profits and at least $25 million has not been distributed. The report criticized FireAid for more than a half-million dollars that were "used to pay bonuses, salaries, and consultants for non-profit organizations" along with funds sent to causes "with little or no nexus to assisting fire victims." Additionally, it faulted the organization for misleading donors in claiming funds would be sent "directly" to victims of the fire when "FireAid has diverted donations to third-party groups" instead.
