= Dad Country =

Studio album by Jonny Fritz
- Released: April 15, 2013
- Studios: Jackson Browne's studio in Los Angeles, California
- Genre: Country music
- Length: 34:18
- Label: ATO Records
- Producers: Jonny Fritz, Taylor Goldsmith

Jonny Fritz chronology
Down on the Bikini Line (2011)	Dad Country (2013)	Sweet Creep (2016)

Dad Country is the third album by American country musician Jonny Fritz, and his first under his real name (as opposed to his stage name, Jonny Corndawg). It was released on ATO Records on April 15, 2013, and was co-produced by Fritz and Dawes guitarist-singer Taylor Goldsmith.

== Critical reception ==
Professional ratings
Aggregate scores
Source	Rating
Metacritic	(70/100)
Review scores
Source	Rating
AllMusic	(unrated)
American Songwriter	3.5/5 stars
Blurt	3/5 stars
Paste	(5.0/10)
Robert Christgau	A–

According to review aggregator Metacritic, Dad Country received generally favorable reviews from critics. For example, Robert Christgau gave the album an A−, and said that it "presents [Fritz] as an ordinary Southern-accented male with an unusually high-strung larynx who goes to bars and forgets the garbage and bathes in the holy pool of the Mount of Venus and catches sick and drives 250 miles to get tossed from your birthday party just like any other fella."

== Track listing ==
1. Goodbye Summer 03:30
2. All We Do Is Complain 03:14
3. Holy Water 02:40
4. Social Climbers 03:01
5. Aint It Your Birthday (free) 03:12
6. Shut Up 04:22
7. Wrong Crowd 02:21
8. Have You Ever Wanted To Die 01:56
9. Fever Dreams 02:32
10. Trash Day 02:58
11. Suck In Your Gut 01:55
12. Instrumental 02:37

== Personnel ==
- Rachel Briggs- Cover Photo
- Spencer Cullum- Pedal Steel
- Jonny Fritz- Back Cover Photo, Composer, Photography, Primary Artist, Producer, Vocals
- Wylie Gelber- Bass
- Griffin Goldsmith- Drums, Vocals (Background)
- Taylor Goldsmith- Guitar, Guitar (Rhythm), Producer, Vocals (Background)
- Kevin Hayes- Cover Photo
- Josh Hedley- Fiddle, Vocals (Background)
- Blake Mills- Guitar
- Jerry Pentecost- Drums
- Tay Strathairn- Piano
- Taylor Zachry- Bass
