= North Hills (album) =

Studio album by Dawes
- Released: August 18, 2009
- Genre: Folk rock
- Length: 54:56
- Label: ATO
- Producer: Jonathan Wilson

Dawes chronology
North Hills (2009)	Nothing Is Wrong (2011)

North Hills is the debut studio album by American folk-rock band Dawes, released on August 18, 2009.

== Reviews ==
Professional ratings
Review scores
Source	Rating
AbsolutePunk	93%
Allmusic	3.5/5 stars
The Austin Chronicle	3/5 stars
Filter	82%
The Line of Best Fit	8/10 stars
PopMatters	6/10
Stereo Subversion	B+
This Is Fake DIY	7/10

North Hills received mostly favorable reviews from the music critics. AbsolutePunk's Gregory Robson said the album "is the sound of something truly astonishing beginning to take shape" with "near-flawless roots-rock offerings that drip with such a defined sense of soul, grit and harmony, it feels nearly criminal to label this album contemporary." Pemberton Roach called them a "rootsy quartet" with a "tasteful vibe", and an "earthy sound." At Filter, Kyle MacKinnel described the album as "straightforward" and a "refreshing reminder of our roots" that "notches a victory for the believers." The Line of Best Fit's Melanie McGovern predicted the release would "be as easily digested and perhaps more soul baring as one would hope."

Stereo Subversion's Dan MacIntosh wrote that "where ever this North Hills hideaway is, it sure sounds like the place to be for those in search of a quality music retreat." At This Is Fake DIY, Martyn Young said the album was "full of subtle wonder, and in its evocative charms you can easily see how Dawes have become so feted". However, Doug Freeman of The Austin Chronicle derided the album saying that "working a sound this classic doesn't allow for many surprises". A PopMatters review said the album's sound was "too obvious in its attempt to fit into a certain mold", and called the effort "a last-ditch effort to hop on a bandwagon".

== Track listing ==
All tracks are written by Taylor Goldsmith, except where noted.

Tracklist
No.	Title	Length
1.	"That Western Skyline"	5:58
2.	"Love Is All I Am"	5:16
3.	"When You Call My Name"	4:44
4.	"Give Me Time"	3:18
5.	"When My Time Comes"	5:08
6.	"God Rest My Soul"	4:58
7.	"Bedside Manner"	4:11
8.	"My Girl to Me"	4:51
9.	"Take Me Out of the City"	5:11
10.	"If You Let Me Be Your Anchor"	4:25
11.	"Peace in the Valley" (Goldsmith, Blake Mills)	6:56
Total length:		54:56

== Personnel ==
Dawes

- Taylor Goldsmith – lead vocals, guitars
- Griffin Goldsmith – drums, vocals, percussion
- Wylie Gelber – bass guitar
- Tay Strathairn – piano, vocals, organ
- Patrick Sansone - guitars, vocals, organ, percussion

== Charts ==
The album peaked at #23 on the Billboard Heatseeker chart.
