= Goodbye Summer =

Goodbye Summer may refer to:

== Books ==
- Goodbye Summer, by Alison Prince 1983
- The Goodbye Summer, by Crosby Bonsall 1979
- The Goodbye Summer, by Patricia Gaffney 2004
- Goodbye summer blues, by Philip Prowse 1995

== Film and TV ==
- Goodbye Summer, 1914 film directed by Van Dyke Brooke

== Music ==
- Goodbye Summer EP, by False Start (band)
- "Goodbye Summer" (Danielle Bradbery and Thomas Rhett song), 2018
- "Goodbye Summer", a 2013 song by Jonny Fritz from Dad Country
- "Goodbye Summer", a 2013 song by f(x) from Pink Tape
- "Goodbye Summer", a 1963 song by Joanie Sommers
- "Goodbye Summer", a 1970 song by Peter Lee Stirling
