= Oh Brother (album) =

Studio album by Dawes
- Released: October 11, 2024
- Length: 42:27
- Label: Dead Ringers
- Producer: Mike Viola

Dawes chronology
Misadventures of Doomscroller (2022)	Oh Brother (2024)

Oh Brother is the ninth studio album by American folk rock band Dawes. It was released on October 11, 2024, by the band's own label Dead Ringers. The album was produced by Mike Viola.

== Promotion ==
Oh Brother was preceded by the release of three singles. The album's lead single, "House Parties", was released on July 17, 2024 accompanied by a music video for the song. In a press release, Taylor Goldsmith said in a press release that the song was about "how true cultural experiences aren't in the tourist traps but within human connections among specific communities". The second single, "Still Strangers Sometimes", was released on August 21, 2024. The third and final single, "Surprise!", was released on September 18, 2024.

== Critical reception ==
Writing for No Depression, Alli Patton opined that the album contained mostly of "an entrancing mix of philosophical prattle, satire-shrouded confessions, and happy sad soliloquies" and concluded her review by writing: "Dawes cuts and consoles against a staggering soundscape where guitar-talking, folk-rock, bleary-eyed grooves, and a kind of misfit pop all blur into one succinct soundtrack for these unprecedented times, for all of our missteps and everything we’re still doing right." Writing for AllMusic, Matt Collar rated the album four out of five stars and concluded his review by writing: "If there's one thing that's evident while listening to the refreshing, back-to-basics craftsmanship of Oh Brother, it's that the Goldsmith brothers clearly know what they and Dawes are all about."

== Track listing ==
All tracks are written by Taylor Goldsmith.

Oh Brother track listing
No.	Title	Length
1.	"Mister Los Angeles"	3:36
2.	"Front Row Seat"	4:40
3.	"Still Strangers Sometimes"	3:30
4.	"Surprise!"	6:19
5.	"House Parties"	3:54
6.	"King of the Never-Wills"	6:24
7.	"The Game"	5:11
8.	"Enough Already"	4:08
9.	"Hilarity Ensues"	4:45
Total length:		42:27

== Personnel ==
Credits for Oh Brother adapted from Tidal.

=== Dawes ===
- Taylor Goldsmith - vocals, guitar, production
- Griffin Goldsmith - vocals, drums, percussion, production

=== Additional musicians ===
- Trevor Menear - guitar
- Z Lynch - bass
- Frank Locastro - keyboards

=== Personnel ===
- Mike Viola - production, mixing, engineering, recording
- David Boucher - engineering
- Eric Boulanger - mastering
- Caitlin Gerard - art director
- Ian Bush - design
- Silvia Griv - photography
- Brian Schwartz - managing
- Crawford Byers - managing
