= Nothing Is Wrong =

Studio album by Dawes
- Released: June 7, 2011
- Genres: Folk rock; roots rock
- Length: 51:49
- Label: ATO
- Producer: Jonathan Wilson

Dawes chronology
North Hills (2009)	Nothing Is Wrong (2011)	Stories Don't End (2013)

Nothing Is Wrong is the second studio album by American folk-rock band Dawes, released on June 7, 2011. It is the only Dawes album to feature keyboard player Alex Casnoff.

== Reviews ==
Professional ratings
Review scores
Source	Rating
AllMusic	3.5/5 stars
American Songwriter	3.5/5 stars
The A.V. Club	B+
Beats per Minute	80%
Drowned in Sound	5/10
Glide Magazine	4.5/5 stars
The Independent	5/5 stars
The Line of Best Fit	7/10 stars
No Ripcord	8/10
Paste	8.5/10
Rolling Stone	3/5 stars
Spin	7/10

Nothing Is Wrong received favorable reviews from many music critics and Metacritic gave it a score of 80 out of 100, based on 14 reviews. Uncut placed it at number 39 on its list of the "Top 50 Albums of 2011."

Andrew Leahey of AllMusic told that "those looking to rock out won’t find many headbanging opportunities here" because the album "works well as driving music, particularly if the scenery outside your windshield matches the sepia-toned music." At American Songwriter, Paula Carino found that the release "succeeds on its own terms, and will appeal to fans of solid roots-rock songwriting." Steven Hyden of The A.V. Club affirmed that on the album "Dawes comes far, and appears to be only getting started." Beats per Minute's Johan Alm evoked that "beyond the band's development as musicians and the excellent production, the growth and increasingly personal nature of Taylor Goldsmith’s songwriting is what makes Nothing Is Wrong the success it is. " At Glide Magazine, Chris Calarco touched on that "with Nothing is Wrong's ability to fire poignant and lasting musical arrows straight from a heart of gold, Dawes signals they are here to stay."

At The Independent, Andy Gill called this "a thoughtful, mature conclusion to an album that seems to summarise one of the more welcoming trends in American rock." The Line of Best Fit's Janne Oinonen alluded to how the album has "an apt title", which is because "the outcome is an album that sounds skilled and accomplished rather than truly inspired." Alan Shulman of No Ripcord said that he would not "hesitate to recommend this record to anybody", and stated that as a listener they "may not love it, but you’ll probably like it, and that’s enough." At Paste (magazine), Wyndham Wyeth proclaimed the release as being "something truly special." Chris Martins of Spin affirmed that even "though restlessness is the dominant lyrical theme here", yet the release "sounds familiar and comforting" at the same time.

However, Drowned in Sound's Al Horner told the release "paws so affectionately at the Americana idols that inspired it that you glean nothing of the band that penned it", which he recommended it "would have been a better record had that time been spent eking the emotion out of their own lives, rather than their record collections." At Rolling Stone, Will Hermes highlighted that "this tuneful but sometimes bland set could use more of that", which is from "Taylor's current side project, Middle Brother, shows his wilder, less studied side".

== Track listing ==
All tracks are written by Taylor Goldsmith.

Tracklist
No.	Title	Length
1.	"Time Spent in Los Angeles"	4:28
2.	"If I Wanted Someone"	4:39
3.	"My Way Back Home"	6:25
4.	"Coming Back to a Man"	3:51
5.	"So Well"	5:31
6.	"How Far We've Come"	2:59
7.	"Fire Away"	6:23
8.	"Moon in the Water"	3:54
9.	"Million Dollar Bill"	4:12
10.	"The Way You Laugh"	3:48
11.	"A Little Bit of Everything"	5:39
Total length:		51:49

== Personnel ==
Dawes

- Taylor Goldsmith - lead vocals, guitar, backing vocals (6), organ (2, 5, 8), piano (11)
- Griffin Goldsmith - drums, backing vocals, percussion (1, 2, 3, 4, 6), lead vocals (6)
- Wylie Gelber - bass
- Alex Casnoff - piano, backing vocals

Additional musicians

- Jonathan Wilson - production, recording, mixing, percussion, mandolin, backing vocals (9)
- Benmont Tench - organ (1, 3, 7)
- Ben Peeler - lap steel guitar (7, 10, 11)
- Jackson Browne - backing vocals (7)

== Chart performance ==
Chart (2011)	Peak position
US Billboard 200	64
US Americana/Folk Albums (Billboard)	5
US Independent Albums (Billboard)	10
US Top Rock Albums (Billboard)	18
US Indie Store Album Sales (Billboard)	8

Airplay

Song	Chart	Position
"Time Spent In Los Angeles"	Billboard Adult Alternative Songs	17
"If I Wanted Someone"	Billboard Adult Alternative Songs	21
