= Misadventures of Doomscroller =

Studio album by Dawes
- Released: July 22, 2022
- Studio: Five Star Studios
- Genre: Rock
- Length: 46:07
- Label: Rounder
- Producer: Jonathan Wilson

Dawes chronology
Good Luck with Whatever (2020)	Misadventures of Doomscroller (2022)	Oh Brother (2024)

Singles from Misadventures of Doomscroller
- 1. "Someone Else's Cafe/Doomscroller Tries To Relax" Released: May 6, 2022

Misadventures of Doomscroller is the eighth studio album by Dawes, released on July 22, 2022, via Rounder Records.

== Album content ==
Titular "Doomscroller"

On Misadventures of Doomscroller, the band diverts from their short, more lyrically focused songs of the past, to longer, more instrumental songs. Frontman Taylor Goldsmith mentions this while talking about 'Someone Else's Cafe / Doomscroller Tries To Relax' on the Dawes website: "Every time a take was completed felt like a major accomplishment. It being 10 minutes really raised the stakes. Didn’t wanna be the guy to mess up in minute 7 or 8 with everyone playing flawlessly up to that point. This whole album, and this song especially, felt a little beyond our comfort zone and I’m really proud of what that’s done to the music."

== Critical reception ==
Retrospective professional ratings
Review scores
Source	Rating
AllMusic	4.5/5 stars

Misadventures of Doomscroller was named one of the favorite rock albums of 2022 by AllMusic users.

== Track listing ==
All songs were written by Taylor Goldsmith, except where noted.

No.	Title	Length
1.	"Someone Else's Cafe / Doomscroller Tries to Relax"	9:26
2.	"Comes in Waves"	5:30
3.	"Everything is Permanent"	8:43
4.	"Ghost in the Machine"	6:19
5.	"Joke in there Somewhere"	5:24
6.	"Joke in there Somewhere - Outro" (Goldsmith, Jimmy Jolliff)	1:37
7.	"Sound that No One Made / Doomscroller Sunrise"	9:03
