= Ode to Sunshine =

Studio album by Delta Spirit
- Released: August 26, 2008
- Studio: Julian, California
- Genre: Indie rock, alt-country, indie folk, folk-rock, swamp rock, soul, folk, blues, Americana, southern rock
- Length: 42:52
- Label: Rounder
- Producer: Delta Spirit

Delta Spirit chronology
I Think I've Found It (2006)	Ode to Sunshine (2008)	History from Below (2010)

Ode to Sunshine is an album by American rock band Delta Spirit, released August 26, 2008, on Rounder Records. It is the band's debut album, following their 2006 EP I Think I've Found It.

== Reception ==
Ode to Sunshine ratings
Aggregate scores
Source	Rating
Metacritic	77/100
Review scores
Source	Rating
AllMusic	3.5/5 stars
The Austin Chronicle	3/5 stars
The A.V. Club	B
NME	3.5/5 stars
PopMatters	9/10
Prefix	7/10
Slant	3/5 stars
Spin	8/10

According to the review aggregator Metacritic, Ode to Sunshine received "generally favorable reviews" based on a weighted average score of 77 out of 100 from 12 critic scores.

AllMusic's Hal Horowitz wrote, "The ex-Noise Ratchet founders shift to more rootsy territory with their new band, yielding impressive results", and that "Ode to Sunshine was recorded in a cabin in Julian, CA, and those surroundings seem to have brought a raw, rootsy, almost Basement Tapes-styled feel to the stripped-down songs and production." The A.V. Club's Chris Martins said the album "is brimming with gritty, staggering soul that floods the gap between the Stones' R&B-inflected; early oeuvre and Cold War Kids' world-weary keening. That said, Ode is impressively measured, and neither the rollicking shambolics of "Trashcan" nor the slow, whiskey-seeping grind of "Parade" would be half as effective without a certain tautness."

NME's Tessa Harris said the band's "sound is timeworn and instantly familiar: the "set me free" chorus of 'Streetwalker' is pure Springsteen, while the honky-tonk of 'Trashcan' is classic Stones, made more remarkable by the sandpaper snarl of their frontman." PopMatters' Andrew Martin wrote that "Every year there is one album that comes out of nowhere, kicks you in the ass, and demands your attention. It finds itself on your iPod, inside your CD player, and blaring out of your headphones or speakers. Then, you commit to spreading the word about the album to anyone and everyone. Because, just like how misery loves company, so does a music lover who has just discovered a fantastic new album. For me, and others I am sure, Delta Spirit's Ode to Sunshine is just that album." Prefix Magazine said "it would be easy to christen the Delta Spirit's sonically referential sound as the Violent Femmes gone sepia. Many already have", and "Despite Delta Spirit's anarchic (i.e., creatively opportunistic) sampling of everything from cold war folk to the Cold War Kids, when the band members hit their stride — as on the rumbling, locomotive grooves of piano-stung epic Americana on "Trashcan" — Sunshine becomes nothing less than an ode to musical joy."

Slant's Nate Adams wrote that "The songs on Sunshine range from vaguely spiritual (the groove-heavy first single "Trashcan") to openly Christian (the passable but forgettable "Children"), and while this is by no means a bad thing, it can be distracting at times: No one likes to be preached at, even if the message is wrapped up inside bluesy pop songs", and that "Sadly, the guitars are buried low in the mix, forcing the vocals and piano to do most of the work." Spin's Nate Adams said "Whether it's a happy accident or a painstaking work of art, the rousing debut of this San Diego quintet impresses mightily. Despite passing echoes of Spoon and Violent Femmes, Delta Spirit's rough barroom pop is its own creature, with jangly pianos, rattling drums, and scruffy acoustic guitars making a thrilling ruckus."

== Track listing ==
All tracks are written by Delta Spirit

Ode to Sunshine track listing
No.	Title	Length
1.	"Tomorrow Goes Away"	1:30
2.	"Trashcan"	3:36
3.	"People C'Mon"	3:25
4.	"House Built for Two"	5:48
5.	"Strange Vine"	4:08
6.	"Streetwalker"	4:10
7.	"People Turn Around"	5:01
8.	"Parade"	3:05
9.	"Bleeding Bells"	2:45
10.	"Children"	5:33
11.	"Ode to Sunshine"	3:47
Total length:		42:52

== Personnel ==
- Jon Jameson – bass
- Brandon Young – percussion
- Matthew Vasquez – vocals
- Sean Walker – guitar
- Kelly Winrich – multi-instrumentalist
