= Delta Spirit (album) =

Studio album by Delta Spirit
- Released: March 13, 2012
- Genre: Indie rock
- Length: 43:11
- Label: Rounder
- Producer: Chris Coady

Delta Spirit chronology
History from Below (2010)	Delta Spirit (2012)	Into the Wide (2014)

Singles from Delta Spirit
- 1. "California" Released: January 2012

Professional ratings
Aggregate scores
Source	Rating
Metacritic	69/100
Review scores
Source	Rating
AllMusic	3/5 stars
Consequence of Sound	B−
PopMatters	(positive)

Delta Spirit is the self-titled third studio album by the band Delta Spirit. The album was released on March 12, 2012, through Rounder Records.

It charted on the Billboard 200, reaching #1 on the Heatseekers chart, #12 on the Tastemakers chart and #15 on the Alternative Albums chart.

It spawned the single "California", which garnered significant radio airplay in the band's hometown of San Diego.

== Track listing ==
1. "Empty House" - 3:56
2. "Tear It Up" - 3:24
3. "California" - 3:41
4. "Idaho" - 3:28
5. "Home" - 4:08
6. "Otherside" - 4:08
7. "Tellin' the Mind" - 2:47
8. "Time Bomb" - 4:21
9. "Into the Darkness" - 4:36
10. "Money Saves" - 4:25
11. "Yamaha" - 4:24

== Personnel ==
- Matthew Vasquez - vocals, guitars
- Kelly Winrich - keys, programming, guitars, percussion, lap steel, drone box, bg's
- William Mclaren - guitars, bg's
- Johnathan Jameson - bass, bg's
- Brandon Young - drums, percussion, bg's

== Charts ==
Chart (2012)	Peak position
Heatseekers Albums	1
Billboard 200	103
Alternative Albums	15
Tastemakers	12
