= Mutable Set =

Studio album by Blake Mills
- Released: May 8, 2020
- Length: 51:25
- Label: Verve

Blake Mills chronology
Look (2018)	Mutable Set (2020)	Notes with Attachment (2021)

Singles from Mutable Set
- 1. "Vanishing Twin" Released: March 20, 2020

Professional ratings
Aggregate scores
Source	Rating
Metacritic	84/100
Review scores
Source	Rating
AllMusic	4/5 stars
Exclaim!	8/10
The Guardian	4/5 stars
Pitchfork	8.3/10
Tom Hull – on the Web	B

Mutable Set is the fourth studio album by American singer-songwriter Blake Mills. It was released on May 8, 2020 under Verve Records and New Deal Records.

== Critical reception ==
Mutable Set was met with universal acclaim from critics. At Metacritic, which assigns a weighted average rating out of 100 to reviews from mainstream publications, this release received an average score of 84, based on 7 reviews.

== Track listing ==
Mutable Set track listing
No.	Title	Lyrics	Music	Length
1.	"Never Forever"	Blake Mills; Cass McCombs	Blake Mills; McCombs	4:53
2.	"May Later"	Mills; McCombs	Mills; McCombs	5:18
3.	"Eat My Dust"	Mills	Mills	2:02
4.	"Money Is The One True God"	Mills	Mills	6:55
5.	"Summer All Over"	Mills; McCombs	Mills; McCombs	4:55
6.	"Vanishing Twin"	Mills; McCombs	Mills; McCombs	6:16
7.	"My Dear One"	Mills; McCombs	Mills; McCombs	5:33
8.	"Farsickness"	Mills; Gabriel Kahane	Mills; Kahane	2:51
9.	"Mirror Box"		Mills	4:58
10.	"Window Facing A Window"	Mills	Mills; Armando Manzanero ("El Ciego")	4:58
11.	"Off Grid"	Mills	Mills	2:46
Total length:				51:25
