= California (Delta Spirit song) =

Single by Delta Spirit

from the album Delta Spirit
- Released: January 2012
- Recorded: 2011
- Genre: Indie rock; alternative rock; surf
- Length: 3:39
- Label: Rounder
- Songwriter(s): Delta Spirit
- Producer(s): Chris Coady

Delta Spirit singles chronology
"Bushwick Blues" (2010)	"California" (2012)	"From Now On" (2014)

"California" is a song by American indie rock band Delta Spirit, from their 2012 self-titled album.

Written by the band, and released as a single two months prior to the album's release, it earned the band some of its first radio airplay and television appearances. A music video for the song was filmed and released in 2012.

== Origin ==
"California" was written by Kelly Winrich about his girlfriend on the East Coast, while he was living in California, after troubles and difficulties they "Called it quits". He wrote the song soon after."

== Reception ==
AbsolutePunk's Gregory Robson described the song as "Placid, vernal and painstakingly honest, it represents Delta Spirit at their very best." In May 2012, Delta Spirit performed the song on Jimmy Kimmel Live!

In May 2012, Delta Spirit was chosen as San Diego's 91X's local artist of the month, with the station highlighting the success of the song. Subsequently, California was chosen as a "Song du Jour" on San Diego's XETRA-FM and has remained in occasional rotation since then.

== Music video ==
A music video for "California" was released in early 2012 with the tagline: "Being young is way more fun than being old, and being a punk is way more fun than being a square." It features young friends riding in the back of a pickup truck, hanging out at a bar, and attending a rock concert.

== Use in pop culture ==
In December 2013, the song was featured on American Dad! during "Independent Movie" (season 10, episode 6).
