= Jonny Fritz =

American singer-songwriter

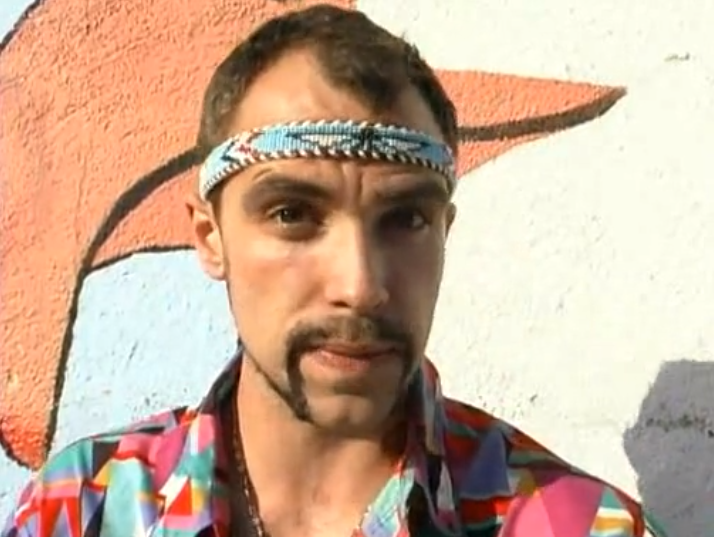

Background information
- Also known as: Jonny Corndawg
- Born: Jonathan Russell Fritz; Montana, United States
- Genre: Alternative country
- Occupation: Alternative country musician
- Instrument: Guitar
- Labels: Loose, ATO
- Website: jonnyfritz.com

Jonathan Russell Fritz, formerly known as Jonny Corndawg, is an American alternative country musician who was born in Missoula, Montana. He has released four albums, two under the name "Jonny Corndawg" and two as "Jonny Fritz".

== Career ==
In 2007, Fritz (then known as Jonny Corndawg) released his first official album, I’m Not Ready To Be a Daddy. In 2010, Fritz released a 7" with Deer Tick on Partisan Records, of which only 500 copies were made. He released his second album, Down on the Bikini Line, on August 30, 2011 in the United States on Nasty Memories Records. In 2012, Fritz dropped the "Corndawg" from his stage name.

In 2013, Fritz released Dad Country, his third album overall and his first under the name "Jonny Fritz", on ATO Records. It was recorded at Jackson Browne's studio in Los Angeles, and was produced by Taylor Goldsmith of Dawes. It was followed by the release of the album's single "Goodbye Summer", for which a music video was also made and directed by Sean Dunne.

Jonnys' 4th record Sweet Creep was released in 2016. Produced by Jim James and recorded over three days using a makeshift outdoor studio in the Montecito Hills of California. The entire record was recorded outside and featured Taylor Goldsmith of Dawes (band), playing multiple instruments, including guitar, bass, and keyboard, his brother Griffin Goldsmith on drums, Joshua Hedley of fiddle and My Morning Jacket's prolific front man Jim James also lending his voice, and guitar to multiple tracks.

== Critical reception ==
Down on the Bikini Line received a B− grade from both the A.V. Club and Consequence of Sound. In the A.V. Club, Steven Hyden wrote that the album's songs were "faithful and tuneful genre exercises," and in Consequence of Sound, Alex Young wrote that Corndawg displays "a preternatural grasp of honky-tonk, bluegrass, traditional, and outlaw country music" on the album. However, Young also said that the album's lyrics "can still sometimes be read as insulting".

According to Metacritic, Dad Country received very favorable reviews from critics. Hal Horowitz reviewed Dad Country for American Songwriter and gave it 3.5 out of 5 stars. In his review, Horowitz wrote that "brevity works to Fritz’s advantage" on the album and concluded that the music on Dad Country was "some of [Fritz's] best".

Fritz released his fourth studio album, Sweet Creep, October 14, 2016. Rolling Stone named the album #14 in their 40 best country records of 2016.

== Notable performances ==
Fritz performed at SXSW in 2012 and 2014.

== Discography ==
Title	Details	Peak positions
Title	Details	US Country
I'm Not Ready to Be a Daddy	Release date: 2008; Label: Nasty Memories Records	—
Down on the Bikini Line	Release date: August 30, 2011; Label: Nasty Memories Records	—
Dad Country	Release date: April 15, 2013; Label: Loose, ATO Records	72
Sweet Creep	Release date: October 14, 2016; Label: Loose, ATO Records	
Debbie Downers	Release date: October 24, 2025; Label: Gar Hole Records	
-	"—" denotes releases that did not chart	
