= Into the Wide =

Studio album by Delta Spirit
- Released: September 9, 2014
- Genre: Indie rock
- Length: 50:26
- Label: Dualtone

Delta Spirit chronology
Delta Spirit (2012)	Into the Wide (2014)

Professional ratings
Aggregate scores
Source	Rating
Metacritic	75/100
Review scores
Source	Rating
AllMusic	4/5 stars
Blurt	4/5 stars
Consequence of Sound	B

Into the Wide is the fourth full-length studio album by the band Delta Spirit, released in 2014. It is the band's first album on Dualtone Records.

== Track listing ==
All tracks are written by Jon Jameson, Brandon Young, Matt Vasquez, Kelly Winrich, & Will McLaren, except where noted.

No.	Title	Writer(s)	Length
1.	"Push It"		4:09
2.	"From Now On"		3:09
3.	"Live On"		4:13
4.	"Take Shelter"		5:03
5.	"Hold My End Up"		5:39
6.	"Into the Wide"		4:42
7.	"Language of the Dead"	Jameson, Young, Vasquez, Winrich, McLaren, Heather Morgan	3:28
8.	"For My Enemy"	Jameson, Young, Vasquez, Winrich, McLaren, Marthe Vasquez	4:19
9.	"Patriarch"		4:46
10.	"(Interlude)"		1:21
11.	"War Machine"		4:37
12.	"The Wreck"		5:06

Digital only Deluxe Edition
No.	Title	Length
13.	"The Wolf"	6:41
14.	"Sweet Souvenir"	3:01
15.	"I Feel Free"	3:16
16.	"Patriarch (Demo)"	4:49
17.	"Live On (Demo)"	4:19
18.	"From Now On (Demo)"	3:04
19.	"Language of the Dead (Demo)"	3:30
20.	"The Wreck (Demo)"	4:17

- Deluxe Edition - Released June 29, 2015

== Personnel ==
- Matthew Vasquez - vocals, guitars
- Kelly Winrich - keys, programming, guitars, percussion, lapsteel, dronebox, bg's
- William Mclaren - guitars, bg's
- Johnathan Jameson - bass, bg's
- Brandon Young - drums, percussion, bg's

== Charts ==
Chart (2014)	Peak position
Billboard 200	70
Independent Albums	18
Alternative Albums	15
Rock Albums	26
