= Simon Dawes =

American rock band

- Origin: Malibu, California, United States
- Genres: Rock, indie rock, alternative rock
- Label: Record Collection
- Spinoffs: Dawes
- Members: Taylor Goldsmith; Blake Mills; Wylie Gelber; Stuart Johnson

Simon Dawes was a rock band originally from Malibu, California. The band was signed with Record Collection and released their only full-length album, Carnivore, in September 2006. They had previously released three EPs. Blake Mills (guitar) left the band shortly after Carnivore's release. The band's current incarnation is Dawes.

== History ==
The band was composed of four friends. Two of its founding members, Taylor Goldsmith (vocals, guitar, keys, lyrics) and Blake Mills (vocals, guitar, and lyrics), began playing music together in junior high at Malibu High School, and their middle names formed the band name. ("Dawes" is the middle name of Taylor Goldsmith and "Simon" is the middle name of Blake Mills.) The other two founding members were Grant Powell (bass) and Dylan Grombacher (drums). Their sound evolved with replacements Wylie Gelber (bass) and Stuart Johnson (drums). Stuart Johnson was later replaced by Taylor's brother, Griffin Goldsmith.

Along with playing many California shows, Simon Dawes toured with The Walkmen, Maroon 5, Band of Horses, Eisley, Wolfmother and Incubus, among other artists.

The band's last formal concert was in 2007, but on December 9, 2023, the former members (Goldsmith, Mills, Johnson, and Gelber) reunited for a concert at The Bellwether in Los Angeles, California.

== Discography ==
Albums

- Carnivore – (September 12, 2006) Record Collection

EPs

- Stories from Hollywood (2003)
- Simon Dawes (March 2005) Record Collection
- What No One Hears – (October 11, 2005) Record Collection
- Final Noise E.P. – (March 21, 2006) iTunes exclusive

=== DVDs ===
- Live at the BurnLounge Download Spring 06, Las Vegas, NV (Spring 2006) BurnLounge

(Note: the Final Noise E.P. included tracks from a few artists on Eisley's Final Noise tour)
