= Tim Sexton =

American producer, music supervisor

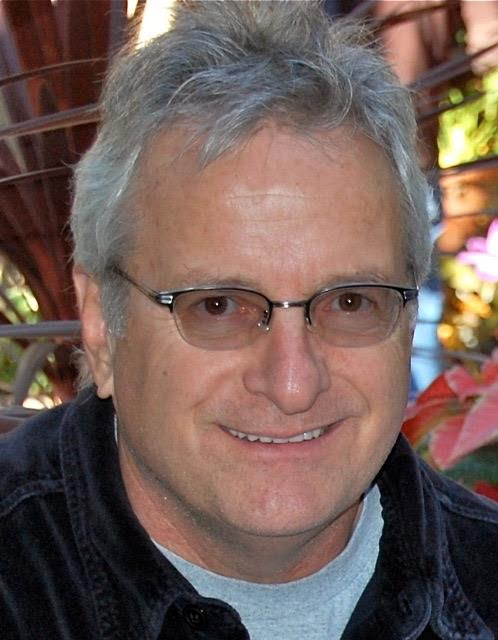
- Born: July 17, 1949 (age 76); Buffalo, NY
- Occupations: Producer, entrepreneur, activist, music supervisor
- Years active: 1972 - present
- Organization(s): Principal and Founder, The Make Good Group; Principal and Founder, The Sexton Company
- Board member of: The Alliance for Climate Education; Liberty Hill Foundation Advisory Board
- Awards: Emmy Award, Live 8 Emmy Award, Idol Gives Back
- Website: makegoodgroup.com

Tim Sexton is an American producer, music supervisor, environmental consultant, and social impact entrepreneur. Noted for events and initiatives which integrate pop culture and social activism, he produced No Nukes, Peace Sunday, Live 8, and was an architect of "Feel the Power" - the precursor to Rock the Vote. He is the principal of the Make Good Group, a company he founded in 2003 to advise corporate clients on sustainability, social responsibility, and brand strategy. Go Green, the environmental program Sexton designed for the Philadelphia Eagles, is considered a model of sustainability.

Sexton served as the music supervisor for dozens of films, including Desperately Seeking Susan, and Rush, which featured Eric Clapton's Grammy Award-winning "Tears in Heaven."

== Early life and education ==
The oldest of 11 children, Sexton was born in Buffalo, New York to Jane Marie Strodel, an artist, and Robert Sexton, an NBA executive and basketball coach. The family moved to San Diego in 1960 when his father accepted a position as the athletic director at the University of San Diego.

== Career ==
Sexton began his career in production with the Ice Follies-Holiday on Ice. He was involved in all of the tasks related to the show's production where he discovered an affinity for stage management and lighting design. Throughout the 1970s, he served as a lighting designer, production consultant, production manager or tour manager for dozens of stadium and arena tours for artists including America, Poco, The Rolling Stones, Jackson Browne, Diana Ross, Earth, Wind & Fire, Rufus & Chaka Khan, Chicago, Robin Trower, Red Skelton, and many others.

Based in Los Angeles, Sexton was active in social, political, and environmental issues. In 1979, he was recruited by Rock & Roll Hall of Fame member Graham Nash to produce No Nukes, composed of five shows at Madison Square Garden (which featured Crosby Stills and Nash, Bruce Springsteen and the E Street Band, James Taylor, Bonnie Raitt, Tom Petty and the Heartbreakers, among others) and an outdoor rally which drew more than 200,000 people on the then-empty landfill section of Battery Park.

In 1984, Sexton partnered with MTV executives including Les Garland to create the "Feel the Power" campaign for the network. With 30 second public service spots featuring artists including Cyndi Lauper, Jimi Hendrix, and Tina Turner, its goal was to mobilize young voters and facilitate voter registration. It was the foundation of Rock the Vote, for which Sexton served as a director for several years.

Based on his work on the No Nukes concerts, which were the subject of a 1980 documentary, Sexton was pursued as a music supervisor for television and film. In 1983, he was retained by 20th Century Fox to oversee contemporary music for the studio. In 1984, he was named vice president of music at Columbia TriStar Pictures and in 1987, with Becky Mancuso-Winding, he co-founded the film music company Magstripe Entertainment. In addition to working with Winding, he served as a music supervisor and consultant for Fox, Disney, and producer Jerry Weintraub.

In 1992, Sexton co-founded Big Screen Records with Irving Azoff's Giant Records. Later, Sexton launched The Track Factory, a boutique film music company, with entertainment industry legend Sidney Sheinberg. In 2000, Sexton was named president and CEO of Digital On-Demand/Red DotNet, which was later acquired by private equity firm Yucaipa and merged with independent home media distributor Alliance Entertainment, where he served as Chief Content Officer and Executive Vice-president of its Media and Entertainment Group.

In 2003, Sexton founded The Sexton Company, which he described in an interview with The Washington Post as a company that "helps companies do well by doing good." He began working with the Philadelphia Eagles on sustainability programs that same year. The team's Go Green initiative began with a recycling bin in every office and grew to include 100% exclusive use of renewable energy at their stadium, offices, and practice facilities. Sexton's Go Green program for the Eagles has become the benchmark in sustainability and has been emulated by the Seattle Mariners, the Atlanta Falcons, the Phoenix Suns, the Green Sports Alliance, and the Oakland As, among many others.

In 2005, Sexton executive produced Live 8, a series of concerts conceived by Bob Geldof and designed to focus attention on debt relief and extreme poverty in Africa. More than 1000 musicians performed on a single day simultaneously at nine concerts on four continents, including Madonna, U2, Jay Z, Pink Floyd, and Paul McCartney. As executive producer of Live 8, Sexton won the first-ever Emmy award for content delivered via the internet.

In 2007, he was a producer of Idol Gives Back, then the most successful charity event in television history. To date it has raised more than $175 million for organizations working to alleviate poverty in America and Africa, and was awarded a special Emmy by the Governors of the Television Academy.

In 2008, with his then partners, Brendan Sexton and Matt Walden, Sexton initiated a sustainability strategy and business development structure for National Grid, the second-largest energy utility company in the world. In 2012, the Sexton Company was renamed The Make Good Group and was featured in an Entrepreneur magazine cover story as one of top 100 companies to watch. The Qualcomm Tricorder XPRIZE, a 2017 global $10 million competition for a consumer device which successfully makes medical diagnoses, was co-conceived by Sexton and wireless health pioneer Don Jones.

In 2022 Sexton collaborated with Austin Beutner, former Los Angeles Superintendent of Unified Schools, to architect the campaign Proposition 28, a California ballot initiative which earmarks approximately $1 billion annually for music and arts education in the state's public schools. Sexton is also the Executive Producer of Reconexion, a Spanish language docu-reality television streaming on Univision’s VIX platform. He is currently producing a documentary film on the lives and careers of Crosby, Stills, & Nash with White Horse Pictures and filmmaker Robert Zemeckis. In 2024 Sexton began spearheading the acquisition and restoration of the Santa Monica Civic Auditorium in partnership with The Azoff Company, Oak View Group, Live Nation Entertainment, and Geyser Holdings.

== Philanthropy ==
Sexton has acted as an advisor and/or, a director (past or present) of the Yale University’s Thorne Prize for Social Innovation in Health or Education, Rock the Vote, USC’s Center for Body Computing, Alliance for Climate Education, Medical Aid for El Salvador, EMA, and Liberty Hill Foundation. He is a co-founder of Southern California's E2, Environmental Entrepreneurs.

== Filmography/Discography ==
Year	Title	Credit	Notes
2024	Reconexión	Executive Producer	
2007	American Idol Gives Back	Producer	Emmy Governors Award
2005	Live 8	Executive producer	Emmy award, Interactive content
2000	Up at the Villa	Music supervisor	
	Where the Money Is	Music director	
1999	Molly	Music supervisor	
1998	Playing by Heart	Music supervisor	
1997	That Old Feeling	Music supervisor	
1996	High School High	Music supervisor	
1996	House Arrest	Music supervisor	
1996	Flipper	Music supervisor	
1995	Virtuosity	Executive music producer	
1995	Losing Isaiah	Music supervisor	
	How to Make an American Quilt	Music supervisor	
1994	Clear and Present Danger	Music supervisor	
	Drop Zone	Music supervisor	
1993	Mr. Jones	Executive music producer	
1993	Sliver	Music supervisor	Includes "Can't Help Falling in Love" by UB40 #1 Hot 100
1993	Twenty Bucks	Music supervisor	
1992	FernGully: The Last Rainforest	Music supervisor	
1992	The Cutting Edge	Music supervisor	
1991	Rush	Music supervisor	Includes Eric Clapton's "Tears in Heaven" which won three Grammy awards in 1993
1991	All I Want for Christmas	Music supervisor	
1991	Crooked Hearts	Executive music producer	
1991	Backdraft	Music supervisor	
1991	True Colors	Music consultant	
1990	Welcome Home, Roxy Carmichael	Music consultant	
1990	Air America	Music supervisor	Includes "Love Me Two Times" by Aerosmith
1990	The Earth Day Special	Music supervisor	
1990	Cry-Baby	Music supervisor	
1990	Opportunity Knocks	Music supervisor	
1989	Listen to Me	Music supervisor	
1989	She's Out of Control	Music supervisor	
1988	My Stepmother Is an Alien	Music supervisor	
1988	Fresh Horses	Music supervisor	
1988	Sunset	Executive in charge of music	
1987	Suspect	Executive in charge of music	
1987	The Principal	Executive in charge of music	
1986	No Mercy	Executive in charge of music	
1986	Let's Get Harry	Executive in charge of music	
1986	About Last Night...	Executive in charge of music	
1986	Short Circuit	Executive in charge of music	
1986	Stripper	Executive in charge of music	
1986	Iron Eagle	Executive in charge of music	
1985	The Jewel of the Nile	Music supervisor	
1985	Sweet Dreams	Executive in charge of music	Music by Patsy Cline; Top 10 album
1985	Real Genius	Executive in charge of music	
1985	The Legend of Billie Jean	Executive in charge of music	Includes "Invincible" by Pat Benatar #10 Hot 100
1985	Desperately Seeking Susan	Music supervisor	Includes Madonna's "Into the Groove" (#1 Hot 100)
1984	Johnny Dangerously	Executive in charge of music	
1984	Gimme an 'F'	Music supervisor	
1984	Revenge of the Nerds	Executive in charge of music	
1984	Bachelor Party	Music supervisor	
1984	Romancing the Stone	Executive in charge of music	
1984	Unfaithfully Yours	Executive in charge of music	
1984	Reckless	Music supervisor	
1983	A Night in Heaven	Music supervisor	Includes "Heaven" by Bryan Adams #1 Hot 100 in 1985
1977	No Nukes	Concert producer	
