= History from Below =

Studio album by Delta Spirit
- Released: June 8, 2010
- Recorded: 2009
- Genre: Indie rock
- Label: Rounder Records

Delta Spirit chronology
Ode to Sunshine (2008)	History from Below (2010)	Waits Room EP (2010)

Professional ratings
Review scores
Source	Rating
AllMusic	3.5/5 stars
Glide Magazine	2/5 stars

History from Below is the follow-up album to 2008's critically acclaimed Ode to Sunshine by San Diego's Delta Spirit. The album was released on June 8, 2010.

The band began streaming "White Table" on its website on May 6.

"Devil Knows You're Dead" was featured in the series finale of Friday Night Lights on July 15, 2011, and "Salt in the Wound" was featured on the television show Grey's Anatomy.

== Track listing ==
1. "9/11" – 3:16
2. "Bushwick Blues" – 3:42
3. "Salt in the Wound" – 5:51
4. "White Table" – 5:07
5. "Ransom Man" – 4:28
6. "Devil Knows You’re Dead" – 3:58
7. "Golden State" – 3:16
8. "Scarecrow" – 4:07
9. "Vivian" – 4:29
10. "St. Francis" – 4:23
11. "Ballad of Vitaly" – 8:05

The last song on the album, "Ballad of Vitaly," was inspired by the story of Vitaly Kaloyev.

== Personnel ==
- Matthew Vasquez – lead vocals, guitars, drums, keyboards, percussion, harmonica
- Kelly Winrich – vocals, keyboards, guitars, drums, percussion, dronebox, horn arrangements
- Jonathan Jameson – vocals, bass guitar, drums, percussion
- Brandon Young – vocals, drums, percussion

Additional musicians:

- Bo Koster – additional keyboards, percussion
- Elijah Thomson – vocals
- Carl Broemel – pedal steel on Devil Knows You're Dead
- Blake Mills – guitar on Devil Knows You're Dead
- Brett Wagner – horn section on St. Francis
- Additional horn arrangements on St. Francis by Brett Wagner
