= Delta Spirit =

American rock band

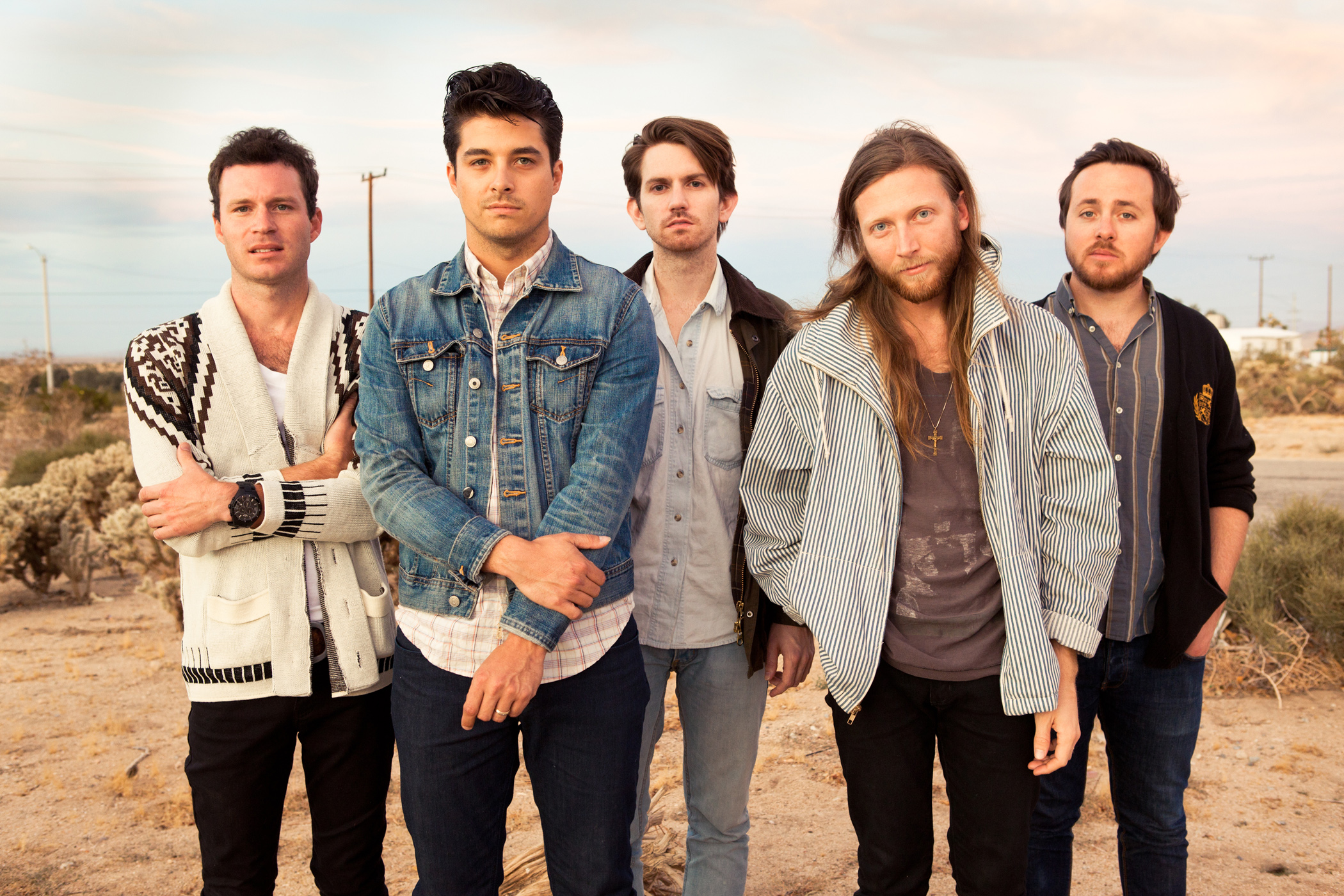
- Delta Sprit c. 2011

Background information
- Origin: San Diego, California, U.S.
- Genres: Indie rock, Americana
- Years active: 2005–present
- Labels: Rounder; Dualtone; Decca; New West Records; (outside North America); Dew Process (Australia); Dine Alone (Canada)
- Members: Jon Jameson; Brandon Young; Matt Vasquez; Kelly Winrich; Will McLaren
- Website: deltaspirit.net

Delta Spirit is an American rock band from California, United States. The group consists of Jonathan Jameson (bass), Brandon Young (drums), Matthew Vasquez (vocals and guitars), Kelly Winrich (multi-instrumentalist), and William McLaren (guitar).

== History ==
Founded in San Diego in 2005, Jameson and Young, who had played with each other in many bands, decided to form a band with their new friend Matthew Logan Vasquez. Young first spotted Vasquez busking on a bench in San Diego at two in the morning, and the two exchanged information. Delta Spirit recorded their I Think I've Found It EP at Winrich's home studio, and he joined the band within the first year. Winrich and Vasquez had been close friends since they were 18 years old. The EP was later released by Monarchy Music on CD and 12" Vinyl in 2006.

The band produced and recorded their debut album, Ode to Sunshine, in a cabin in Julian, CA and released it independently in late 2007. Ode to Sunshine was re-released with new artwork (featuring Winrich's great-uncle Dr. Thomas Payne on the cover) and a new version of the song "Streetwalker" on August 26, 2008, by Rounder Records. The band has made numerous television appearances, including Late Night with Conan O'Brien in late 2008 and Last Call with Carson Daly in March 2009.

Walker left the band in the fall of 2009. Their second album, History From Below, was released on June 8, 2010. The album's title was inspired by the historian and author Howard Zinn. Many of the songs were composed on an acoustic guitar in hotel rooms as the band toured 293 dates in 2009. On November 15, 2010, Delta Spirit performed a live set for "Guitar Center Sessions" on DirecTV. The episode included an interview with program host, Nic Harcourt. In 2010–2011, the band also performed on Jimmy Kimmel Live!, Last Call with Carson Daly, and Jools Holland. That same year Delta Spirit did 2 US tours and one European Tour. In 2011, William McLaren became a full member of Delta Spirit. McLaren formerly played in The Willowz and Cults. In April 2011, Delta Spirit played in the Coachella Valley Music and Arts Festival in Indio, California. In the Summer of 2011, they rented a rehearsal studio in San Pedro, CA used by Cold War Kids and Murder City Devils in order to write what would become their third record, "Delta Spirit". In July, they traveled to West Hurley, NY to refine and record that material at Dreamland with producer Chris Coady (Beach House, TV On the Radio). In the fall of 2011, Delta Spirit opened for My Morning Jacket. On March 13, 2012 they released their third studio album, self-titled Delta Spirit. On August 4, 2012, the band performed at Lollapalooza in Chicago, IL. In 2013 the band relocated to Brooklyn, New York.

The Delta Spirit song "Devil Knows You're Dead" was used in the final scene of the 5th and final season of Friday Night Lights. The song "People, Turn Around", was also used in the final scene of the Season 2 Sons of Anarchy episode "Potlatch". Their song "Salt in the Wound" from their 2010 album History from Below appeared in the Grey's Anatomy episode "With You I'm Born Again". The song "9/11" was used in the final scene of the Season 2 My Life As Liz episode 5. The song "People C'mon" was used in The Big C episode "Blue Eyed Iris" and in UFC Primetime: Velasquez vs. Dos Santos. The song "Running" is featured on "The Walking Dead" Original Soundtrack – Vol. 1 The song "Yamaha" was used in the 2013 movie Warm Bodies. The song "California" was used in American Dad! in season 10, episode 06.

In 2014, the band switched to Dualtone Records and released the album Into the Wide produced by Ben Allen (Animal Collective, Deerhunter, Belle and Sebastian). It is the group's highest-charting album in the United States to date. The band's publicity tour included a performance on Late Show with David Letterman.

In 2019, the band announced a New Year's Eve Show in Austin, Texas, and then later announced the Not Dead Yet tour for 2020.

== Members ==
=== Current ===
- Matthew Vasquez – lead vocals, guitar, piano (2005–present)
- Kelly Winrich – producer, engineer, piano, organ, synthesizer, guitar, bass, drums, vocals (2005–present)
- William McLaren – guitar, vocals (2011–present)
- Jonathan Jameson – bass guitar (2005–present)
- Brandon Young – drums (2005–present)

=== Former ===
- Sean Walker – (2005–2009)

== Discography ==
=== Albums ===
Title	Details	Peak chart positions			
Title	Details	US	US Alt	US Indie	US Rock
Ode to Sunshine	Released: August 26, 2008; Label: Rounder; Format: CD, LP, Digital download	— (Note: Ode to Sunshine did not enter the US Billboard 200, but peaked at number 16 on the US Heatseekers Albums Chart.)	—	—	—
History from Below	Released: July 2, 2010; Label: Rounder; Format: CD, LP, Digital download	179	—	—	—
Delta Spirit	Released: March 12, 2012; Label: Rounder; Format: CD, LP, Digital download	103	15	—	28
Into the Wide	Released: September 9, 2014; Label: Dualtone; Format: CD, LP, Digital download	70	15	17	26
What Is There	Released: September 11, 2020; Label: New West; Format: CD, LP, Digital download	— (Note: What Is There did not enter the US Billboard 200, but peaked at number 75 on the Current Album Sales Chart.)	—	—	—
One Is One	Released: May 20, 2022; Label: New West	TBA			

=== EPs ===
Title	Details
I Think I've Found It	Released: July 1, 2006; Label: Monarchy; Format: CD, LP, Digital download
iTunes Live from SoHo	Released: February 3, 2009; Label: Rounder; Format: Digital download
The Waits Room	Released: January 1, 2010; Label: Rounder; Format: CD, LP, Digital download

=== Singles ===
Title	Year	Peak chart positions	Album
Title	Year	US AAA	Album
"Trashcan"	2008	23	Ode to Sunshine
"People C'mon"	2009	—	Ode to Sunshine
"Bushwick Blues"	2010	30	History from Below
"California"	2012	20	Delta Spirit
"From Now On"	2014	23	Into the Wide
"It Ain't Easy"	2020	20	What Is There
"—" denotes single that did not chart
