= Matthew Logan Vasquez =

American musician

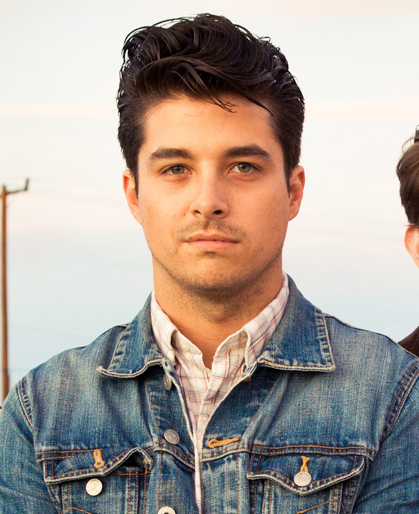
Vasquez in 2011

Matthew Logan Vasquez is best known as the lead singer/songwriter/guitarist of indie rock group Delta Spirit. He is also a member of indie supergroup Middle Brother. He has released six solo albums: Solicitor Returns (2016), Does What He Wants (2017), Light'n Up (2019), As All Get Out (2023), Frank's Full Moon Saloon (2024), and Sana Sana (2026).His 2018 project was Billboard-described indie supergroup Glorietta. Matt currently lives in Wimberley, Texas when not on tour.
