= Dawes (band) =

American folk rock band

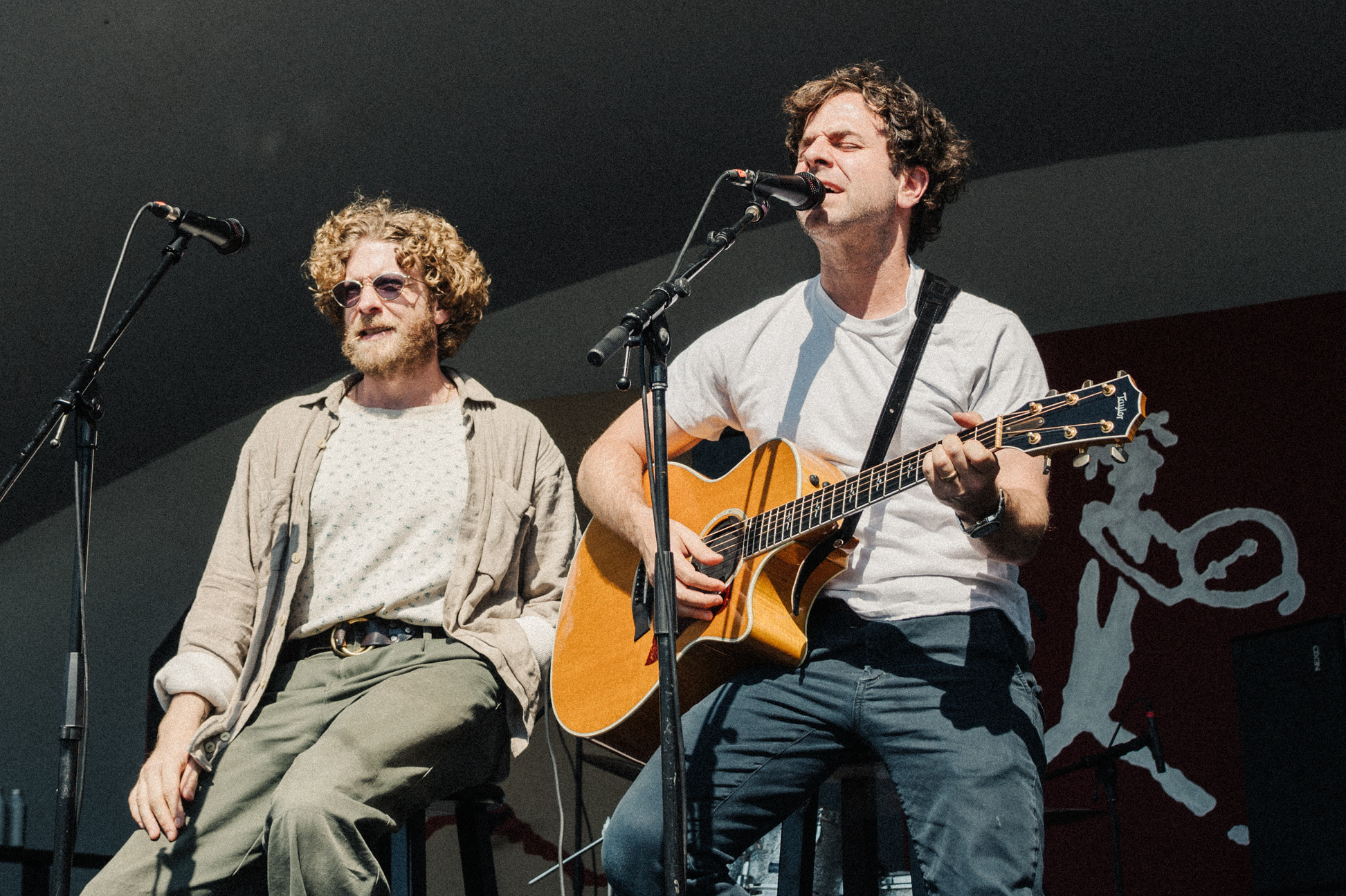
- Dawes performing in Edmonton in 2024

Background information
- Origin: Los Angeles, California, U.S.
- Genres: Folk rock; indie folk; indie rock
- Years active: 2009–present
- Labels: ATO; MapleMusic Recordings; Hub; Loose; Mercury; Rounder
- Spinoff of: Simon Dawes
- Members: Taylor Goldsmith; Griffin Goldsmith
- Past members: Wylie Gelber; Alex Casnoff; Tay Strathairn; Lee Pardini
- Website: dawestheband.com

Dawes is an American folk rock band from Los Angeles, California, composed of brothers Taylor (guitars and vocals) and Griffin Goldsmith (drums). The band has been described as being influenced by the Laurel Canyon sound, found in such artists as Crosby, Stills, and Nash, Joni Mitchell, and Neil Young.

== History ==
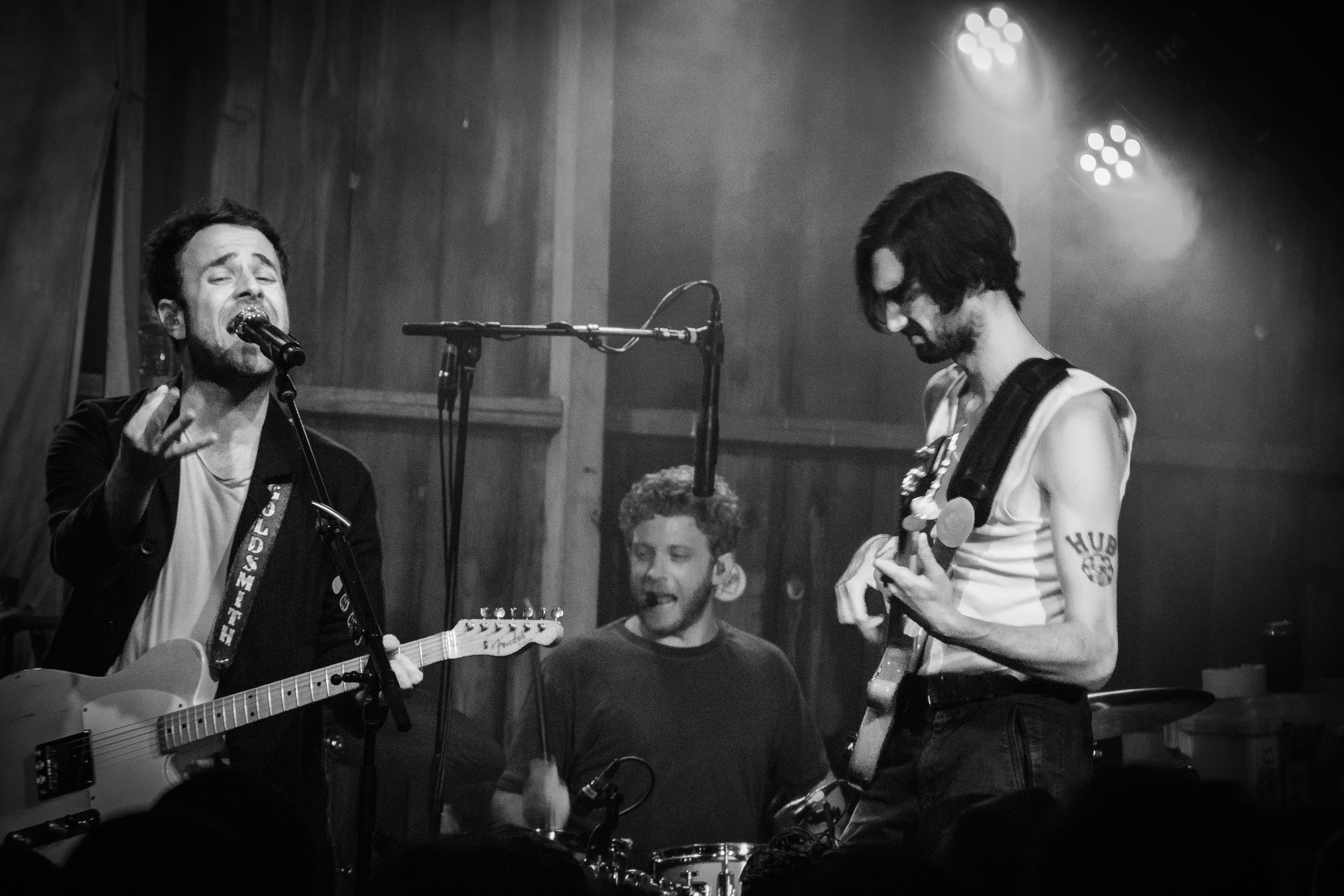
Dawes at Codfish Hollow Barnstormers, Maquoketa, Iowa, 2019

Dawes was formed from the band Simon Dawes after the departure of co-songwriter Blake Mills. The reformation abandoned the earlier band's indie-rock sound in favor of folk rock.

At the invitation of producer Jonathan Wilson, the band joined informal jam sessions with artists Conor Oberst, The Black Crowes's Chris Robinson, and Benmont Tench." These sessions influenced their debut album, North Hills, which was recorded in Laurel Canyon in a live setting direct to analog tape. The resulting sound is one that Rolling Stone magazine referred to as "authentically vintage. Wilco multi-instrumentalist Pat Sansone is also credited with appearing on the release.

The band made their television debut on The Late Late Show with Craig Ferguson on April 14, 2010. Dawes released their second album, Nothing Is Wrong, on June 7, 2011, and toured the US co-headlining with Blitzen Trapper. Original keyboardist Tay Strathairn did not appear on Nothing Is Wrong due to other commitments and was temporarily replaced by Alex Casnoff. Strathairn returned to the band in late 2010. Dawes played alongside Jackson Browne at the Occupy Wall Street event in Zuccotti Park, on December 1, 2011. The band also appeared as themselves on the February 7, 2012, episode of the NBC television series Parenthood.

In February 2013, the band released the single "From a Window Seat" from the 2013 album Stories Don't End on Red General Catalog and their own Hub Records.

The song "Just Beneath the Surface (Reprise)" from Stories Don't End was featured in the episode "Independent Movie" of the animated series American Dad!

On April 22, 2015, Dawes performed on The Late Show with David Letterman, paying tribute to Warren Zevon with their cover of "Desparados Under the Eaves". They also performed the song "Things Happen" on the show.

Duane Betts joined the band as a member of their touring ensemble in June 2015, performing as an auxiliary guitarist. Taylor and Duane alternated playing lead guitar on songs. The band's fourth album, All Your Favorite Bands, was released on June 2, 2015. Three months later, the departure of keyboardist Tay Strathairn was announced in a Facebook post. Lee Pardini began playing keyboards on the band's winter 2015/2016 tour and became a permanent member of the band in July 2016. Betts also left the touring ensemble, and was replaced by guitarist Trevor Menear.

Dawes' fifth album, We're All Gonna Die, was released on September 16, 2016, on HUB Records. The record marked a distinct change of style, building on the band's previous Laurel Canyon folk rock sound with a sonic twist, adding in more synthesized keyboard sounds, heavier bass, and an overall different sound for the group (while still staying true to their roots). We're All Gonna Die was produced by former founding member of Simon Dawes, Blake Mills. In November 2016, they announced their "An Evening with Dawes" tour, which began in January 2017. The "Evening With" tour is distinct from past tours because, instead of having an opening act, they perform 2–3 hour shows with a small intermission.

Dawes opening for Jeff Lynne's ELO first tour in 30 years on North American tour in 2018 playing in cities like Oakland, Denver, and Dallas, and two Shows at Madison Square Garden.

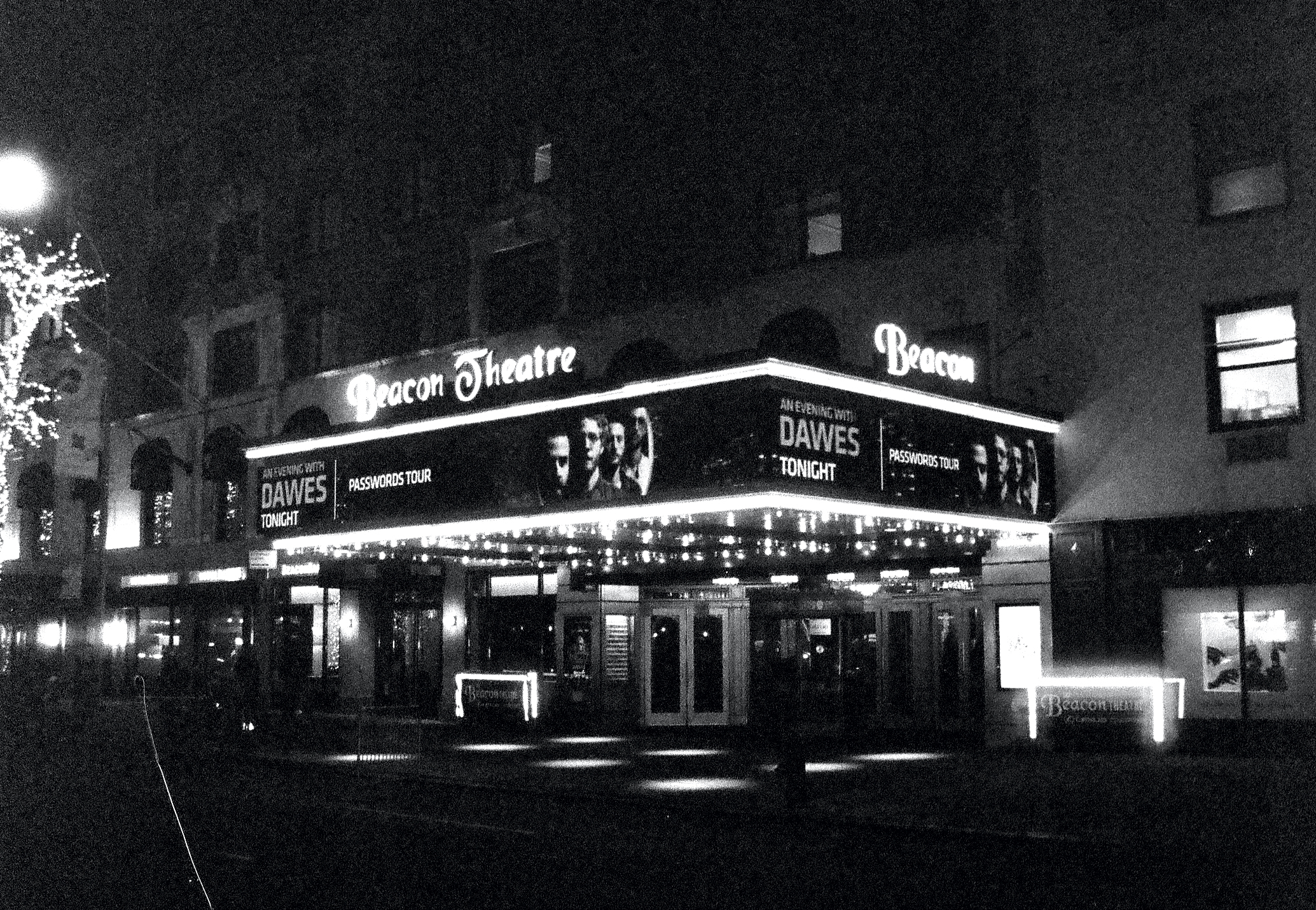
Dawes marquee, Beacon Theatre, NYC, Passwords Tour, 2019

Passwords, Dawes' sixth studio album, was released on June 22, 2018. The band launched a marketing campaign for the album that encouraged fans to search for "passwords" posted throughout the internet. Once a password was found, it could be entered onto a page of the band's official website, where each part of the password represented a musical note. When entered correctly, these musical notes played various refrains from Dawes songs and unlocked exclusive content, including the singles "Never Gonna Say Goodbye" and "Telescope" as well as a Spotify playlist curated by Griffin Goldsmith. In 2020, Dawes played a few shows with Phil Lesh of the Grateful Dead after connecting through Jason Crosby.

On July 22, 2020, Dawes announced their seventh studio album, Good Luck With Whatever, released on October 2 via Rounder Records. In conjunction with the announcement, the band released their first single from the album, "Who Do You Think You're Talking To?"

On May 6, 2022, Dawes announced their eighth album, Misadventures of Doomscroller. It was released July 22 via Rounder Records. The first single was "Someone Else's Cafe/Doomscroller Tries to Relax." In July 2022, the band performed the single on CBS Saturday Morning for over 10 minutes, making it the longest single song performance in television history.

In February 2023, Goldsmith announced that Wylie Gelber would be leaving the band to focus more time on his music equipment company, Gelber & Sons. Gelber played his final full gig with Dawes at the Theatre at the Ace Hotel Los Angeles on May 5, 2023.

In December 2023, Lee Pardini announced he would be leaving the band.

On January 14, 2024, Taylor Goldsmith announced that Dawes has begun work on their next album, titled Oh Brother, with a release date of October 11 announced. The band toured in advance of the album's release. The first single from the album, "House Parties" was released on July 17, 2024. In July 2024, the band performed as Conan O' Brien's backing band for his set at the Newport Folk Festival; O'Brien also appeared in Dawes's video for "Mr. Los Angeles."

Dawes, now a duo, toured in November and December, 2024 to support the release of Oh Brother.

Both Taylor and Griffin Goldsmith were affected by the January, 2025 Eaton Fire in Altadena, California. The music studio they shared adjacent to Taylor's home burned down along with their entire instrument collection. Taylor's home was damaged, but not completely destroyed. His wife, actress and singer Mandy Moore, called it, "not livable, but mostly intact." Griffin and his wife's nearby residence burned to the ground. Former Dawes bassist Wylie Gelber also lost his home in the fire.

On January 30, 2025 Dawes performed "Time Spent in Los Angeles" at the Kia Forum as part of the star-studded FireAid benefit concert and livestream. They also joined Stephen Stills and Mike Campbell on a cover of Stills's Buffalo Springfield anthem "For What It's Worth" and Graham Nash on a rendition of Crosby, Stills, Nash & Young's "Teach Your Children." Three days later, on February 2, Taylor Goldsmith, with Griffin on drums, sang "I Love L.A." alongside John Legend, Sheryl Crow, Brad Paisley, Brittany Howard, and St. Vincent to open the 67th Grammy Awards. On February 3, Dawes announced that they'd released a studio recording of "I Love L.A," with the proceeds benefitting MusiCares.

== Band members ==
Current members

- Taylor Goldsmith – lead vocals, guitar, keyboards (2009–present)
- Griffin Goldsmith – drums, percussion, backing vocals (2009–present)

Current touring members

- Z Lynch – bass (2023–present)
- Adam MacDougall – keyboards (2025–present)
- Frank LoCrasto – keyboards (2023–2025, 2025–)

Former members

- Wylie Gelber – bass (2009–2023)
- Tay Strathairn – piano, keyboards, backing vocals (2009–2010, 2012–2015)
- Alex Casnoff – piano, keyboards, backing vocals (2011)
- Lee Pardini – piano, keyboards, backing vocals (2015–2023)

Former touring members

- Duane Betts – guitar (2015–2016)
- Ian Bush – percussion (2023–2025)
- Trevor Menear – guitar (2016–2026)

Timeline

== Discography ==
=== Albums ===
==== Studio albums ====
Title	Album details	Peak chart positions					Sales
Title	Album details	US	US Folk	US Rock	BEL (FL)	UK	Sales
North Hills	Released: August 18, 2009; Label: ATO	— (Note: North Hills did not enter the US Billboard 200, but peaked at number 23 on the US Heatseekers Albums Chart.)	—	—	—	—	
Nothing Is Wrong	Released: June 7, 2011 (US) September 5, 2011 (Europe); Label: ATO Records, Loose Music	64	5	18	—	—	
Stories Don't End	Released: April 9, 2013; Label: HUB	36	3	9	—	134	US: 65,000
All Your Favorite Bands	Released: June 2, 2015; Label: HUB	37	1	4	160	137	
We're All Gonna Die	Released: September 16, 2016; Label: HUB	42	1	8	—	—	
Passwords	Released: June 22, 2018; Label: HUB	52	3	8	—	—	
Good Luck with Whatever	Released: October 2, 2020; Label: Rounder	— (Note: Good Luck with Whatever did not enter the US Billboard 200, but peaked at number 24 on the US Billboard Album Sales Chart.)	5	44	—	—	
Misadventures of Doomscroller	Released: July 22, 2022; Label: Rounder	—	24	—	—	—	
Oh Brother	Released: October 11, 2024; Label: Dead Ringers	—	—	—	—	—	

==== Live albums ====
Title	Album details
We're All Gonna Live	Released: February 14, 2017; Label: Hub Records
Live from Richmond, VA	Released: 2019; Label: Hub Records
Live at Hotel Cafe, 2/12/08	Released: June 18, 2021; Label: Dead Ringers
Live from the Rooftop (Los Angeles, CA 8.28.20)	Released: April 22, 2022; Label: Hub Records
Rolling Your Third Eye	Released: January 9, 2026; Label: Dead Ringers

=== EPs ===
Title	EP details	Peak chart positions
Title	EP details	US Folk
Stripped Down at Grimey's	Released: October 22, 2013; Label: Hub Records	25
Feed the Fire	Released: October 1, 2018; Label: Hub Records	—

=== Singles ===
==== As lead artist ====
Title	Year	Peak chart positions	Album
Title	Year	US AAA	Album
"Time Spent in Los Angeles"	2011	17	Nothing Is Wrong
"If I Wanted Someone"	2012	21	Nothing Is Wrong
"From a Window Seat"	2013	10	Stories Don't End
"Most People"	2013	16	Stories Don't End
"Things Happen"	2015	6	All Your Favorite Bands
"All Your Favorite Bands"	2015	19	All Your Favorite Bands
"When the Tequila Runs Out"	2016	5	We're All Gonna Die
"We're All Gonna Die"	2016	—	We're All Gonna Die
"Roll with the Punches"	2017	23	We're All Gonna Die
"Living in the Future"	2018	16	Passwords
"Feed the Fire"	2018	23	Passwords
"I Will Run"	2020	—	Non-album single
"Who Do You Think You're Talking To?"	2020	7	Good Luck with Whatever
"St. Augustine At Night"	2020	—	Good Luck with Whatever
"Didn't Fix Me"	2020	—	Good Luck with Whatever
"Free As We Wanna Be"	2021	—	Good Luck with Whatever
"Things Happen" (Celeste Version)	2021	—	Non-album single
"Didn't Fix Me - Piano Version" and "Me Especially - Piano Version"	2021	—	Sketches (Note: Sketches is the name of a two-song single.)
"Walls" (featuring Mike Viola)	2021	—	Petty Rips (Note: Petty Rips is the name of a two-song single.)
"Mistakes We Should Have Made" (Note: "Mistakes We Should Have Made" was originally on Dawes' 2018 album Passwords.)	2021	—	Petty Rips
"Strangers Getting Stranger"	2021	—	Nothing Is Wrong (10th Anniversary Deluxe Edition)
"Fisherman's Blues"	2021	—	Non-album single
"Don't Send Me Away"	2021	—	Nothing Is Wrong (10th Anniversary Deluxe Edition)
"Easy/Lucky/Free"' (Note: "Easy/Lucky/Free" is the B-side of a two-song single. "Million Dollar Bill" by Conor Oberst was the A-side.)	2021	—	Non-album single
"Someone Else's Cafe / Doomscroller Tries to Relax"	2022	—	Misadventures of Doomscroller
"The Interest of Time"	2022	—	Non-album single
"I Love" (Note: Cover of Tom T. Hall song.)	2023	—	Non-album single
"House Parties"	2024	—	Oh Brother
"Still Strangers Sometimes"	2024	—	Oh Brother
"Surprise!"	2024	—	Oh Brother
"I Love L.A."	2025	—	Non-album single
Time Spent in Los Angeles (for Altadena)	2025	—	Non-album single
"When My Time Comes (from the Nothing is Wrong Sessions)	2025	—	Non-album single
"—" denotes singles that did not chart or were not released

==== As featured artist ====
Title	Year	Peak chart positions				Album
Title	Year	US Rock	BEL (FL) Tip	IRE	UK	Album
"Christmas in L.A." (The Killers featuring Dawes)	2013	43	81	100	92	Non-album single
"This Is Life" (Winnetka Bowling League featuring Medium Build and Dawes)	2024	-	-	-	-	Non-album single

=== Other appearances ===
Title	Year	Album
"Someday Never Comes" (John Fogerty with Dawes)	2013	Wrote a Song for Everyone
"What It Takes" (Lee Pardini and Dawes)	2023	Non-album single
"Raining Inside" Brad Paisley with Dawes	2025	Non-album single
