= Blake Mills =

American musician (born 1986)

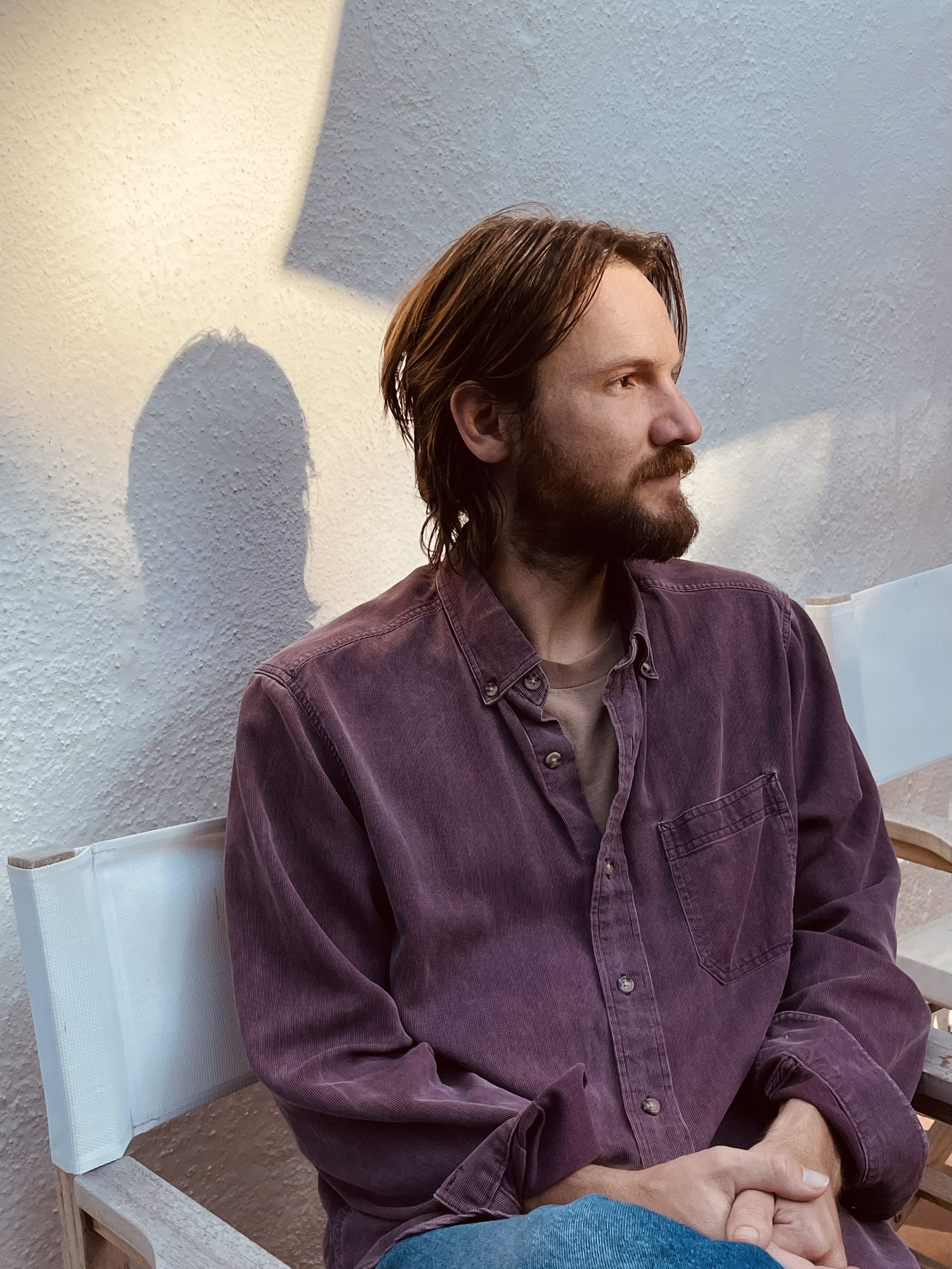
- Mills in 2023

Background information
- Born: Blake Mathew Simon Mills; September 21, 1986 (age 40); Santa Monica, California, U.S.
- Genres: Americana; indie rock; roots rock; folk; country
- Occupations: Singer-songwriter; guitarist; composer; producer
- Instruments: Guitar; vocals
- Labels: New Deal; Verve
- Website: blakemillsonline.com

Blake Mathew Simon Mills (born September 21, 1986) is an American singer-songwriter, guitarist, producer, and composer based in California. He is known for production and guitar work on albums and singles by many artists, including Fiona Apple, Perfume Genius, Bob Dylan, Feist, Jack Johnson, Marcus Mumford, Laura Marling, Weyes Blood, John Legend, Alabama Shakes, Beck, Conor Oberst, and Bruce Hornsby; as a touring musician with artists such as Lucinda Williams, Band of Horses and Jenny Lewis; and his four solo albums.

== Biography ==
Blake Mills was born in Santa Monica, California, and grew up in Malibu, California. He attended Malibu High School with Taylor Goldsmith. Mills and Goldsmith began their musical careers in a band they co-founded called Simon Dawes. Simon Dawes released its debut EP What No One Hears in 2005, and its first LP Carnivore in September 2006 via Record Collection. After the band broke up in 2007, Goldsmith and his younger brother, Griffin, formed the band Dawes with Simon Dawes bassist Wylie Gelber, and Mills went on to serve as a touring guitarist for Jenny Lewis. He went on to tour with Band of Horses, Cass McCombs, Julian Casablancas and Lucinda Williams. As a session musician, Mills has collaborated with Conor Oberst, Kid Rock, Weezer, The Avett Brothers, Paulo Nutini, Norah Jones, Carlene Carter, Jesca Hoop, Dixie Chicks, Zucchero, Pink, Lana Del Rey, Dangermouse, Vulfpeck, Fiona Apple, Beck, Marcus Mumford, Ethan Gruska, Randy Newman, Diana Krall, Johnathan Rice, Bruce Hornsby, Julian Casablancas, Jason Boesel, Benmont Tench, Ed Sheeran, Cass McCombs, Foy Vance, The Killers, Andrew Bird, John Legend, Rufus Wainwright, Phoebe Bridgers, and other performers.

In 2010, Mills released his first solo LP via Record Collection. The original intent for the album Blake Mills was to serve as a calling card for Mills to get session work. It was touted as the album of the year by many websites and fellow musicians, despite its limited release. After spending back-to-back years on tour and in the studio playing on other people's records, Mills made the decision to begin producing in order to explore musical concepts beyond guitar in late 2011. Analog Edition Records released a Blake Mills double A side 7" in 2011, featuring the songs "Hey Lover" and "Wintersong" in 2011; the former track would go on to feature in the first season of the HBO comedy series Silicon Valley in 2014.

In January 2012, Mills appeared on Conan O'Brien for his first national televised performance as a solo artist. He covered Bob Dylan's "Heart of Mine", which he had recently recorded for an Amnesty International benefit CD. Later that year, he went on to co-produce Jesca Hoop's album The House that Jack Built, produced Sara Watkins' album Sun Midnight Sun, wrote and produced "Sad Dream" on Sky Ferreira's EP Ghost. Mills was featured on electric slide guitar on the track '"Go Home" from the 2013 debut album from the group Lucius. For the compilation album Just Tell Me That You Want Me: A Tribute to Fleetwood Mac, he co-produced and played with Billy Gibbons and Matt Sweeney on the track "Oh Well". Mills also served as the opening act and guitarist for Fiona Apple during her 2012 tour through North America. Mills co-produced the track "Artifact 1" on Conor Oberst's album, Upside Down Mountain, which was released in May 2014.

Mills released his second full-length album, Heigh Ho, on September 16, 2014. This self-produced album combines a range of genres. Along with friends and inspirations including Fiona Apple, Jim Keltner, Don Was, Benmont Tench, Jon Brion, and Mike Elizondo, Mills recorded Heigh Ho at the legendary Ocean Way Recording studios in a room built for Frank Sinatra. He also produced the Alabama Shakes' 2015 album Sound & Color, for which his production work was nominated for a Grammy award.

Mills' producer credits in 2016 and 2017 include the albums We're All Gonna Die from former bandmates Dawes, Darkness and Light by John Legend, Semper Femina by Laura Marling, Eternally Even by Jim James and No Shape by Perfume Genius. In 2016 he performed guitar and various other instruments on Andrew Bird's album Are You Serious. In 2017, Mills took part in Randy Newman's Dark Matter as a guitarist.

In November 2018, Mills quietly released an almost-entirely-instrumental EP entitled Look on his own label imprint New Deal Music. The album was created almost entirely using Roland guitar synthesizers from the 1970s with collaboration from saxophonist Sam Gendel, singer Natalie Mering of Weyes Blood, and violin and string-arrangement virtuoso, Rob Moose, who has appeared on nearly every release Mills has produced. Look was the second release on New Deal Music. The first New Deal release, in September 2018, was a soundtrack by Colin Stetson, Canadian-American saxophonist, multireedist, and composer based in Montreal, for the short-lived dramatic television series The First.

On December 5, 2019, Mills teased a clip of "Summer All Over" via an NPR piece by Grayson Haver Currin titled "Songs in an Emergency" that centers around the urgency of climate change. It is a piano-based ballad musing on the Malibu fires of 2018 and co-written with Cass McCombs. When describing the spacious sound-landscape that the song embodies and the title, Mills commented that "writing about the season of summer inherently evokes a Beach Boys vibe, maybe because I'm in Los Angeles, but the implication of the warmest season happening all over the world at the same time is an 'endless summer.'" "Summer All Over" was featured on Mills' third full-length LP titled Mutable Set released in 2020 on New Deal Music with management support by Record Collection and distribution by Verve Label Group, a division of UMG Recordings, Inc.

In 2020, Blake Mills played guitar and harmonium on Bob Dylan's album Rough and Rowdy Ways.

In 2021 Blake and bassist Pino Palladino released their collaborative album Notes with Attachments on jazz label Impulse! Records. The album touched on a number of genres, including art rock, jazz and West African music, and featured 13 musicians and a wide range of instruments.

Released on September 16, 2022, Mills produced and co-wrote the Marcus Mumford album, Self-Titled.

Released March 3, 2023, Blake Mills composed, performed, and produced all songs on the album Aurora for the North American musical drama streaming television miniseries Daisy Jones & The Six.

On June 10, 2023, Mills appeared with Joni Mitchell at her first ticketed concert in over two decades at The Gorge Amphitheatre, playing Mitchell's own guitar and accompanying her on "Amelia." The next month, his album Jelly Road, co-written with Chris Weisman, was released on New Deal/Verve.

== Mollusk sessions ==
From time to time Mills hosts invite-only musical performances at Mollusk Surf Shop in Venice, California. In previous shows Mills has been accompanied by musicians including Jackson Browne, Billy Gibbons, Matt Sweeney, Cass McCombs, Jenny Lewis, Charlie Sexton, Benmont Tench, Dave Rawlings, Val McCallum, Tal Wilkenfeld, Mike Einziger, Danielle Haim, Smokey Hormel, Michael Elizondo, Anthony Wilson, and Xavier Mas.

== Discography ==
=== Solo ===
- Blake Mills (2010) Record Collection
- Heigh Ho (2014) Verve Records / Record Collection
- Look (2018) New Deal Records
- Mutable Set (2020) New Deal Records / Verve Records
- Notes With Attachments (2021, with Pino Palladino) New Deal / Impulse!
- Jelly Road (2023) New Deal Records / Verve Records
- That Wasn't a Dream (2025, with Pino Palladino)

=== Simon Dawes ===
- What No One Hears EP (2005) Record Collection
- Carnivore (2006) Record Collection

=== Compilation ===
- Chimes of Freedom: The Songs of Bob Dylan Honoring 50 Years of Amnesty International (2012) – Track 4 Disc 2 -"Heart of Mine" – Amnesty International distributed by Fontana

=== Production credits ===
- Co-producer – Jesca Hoop – The House That Jack Built (2012) Bella Union
- Producer – Sara Watkins – Sun Midnight Sun (2012) Nonesuch
- Producer – Sky Ferreira – Ghost EP (2012) Capitol
- Co-producer – Billy Gibbons – "Oh Well" – Just Tell Me That You Want Me: A Tribute to Fleetwood Mac (2012) Hear
- Producer – Mt. Egypt – III (2012) Record Collection
- Producer – Conor Oberst – "Artifact 1" – Upside Down Mountain (2014) Nonesuch
- Producer – Fiona Apple – "Container" – The Affair (2014) Showtime
- Producer – Fiona Apple – "Pure Imagination" – (2015) Cultivate / Epic
- Producer – Fiona Apple featuring Maude Maggart – "I'm in the Middle of a Riddle" (2015) Hear
- Producer – Alabama Shakes – Sound & Color (2015) ATO
- Producer – Brittany Howard – "I Feel Free" – Joy (2015) 21st Century Fox
- Producer – Dawes – We're All Gonna Die (2016) HUB Records
- Co-producer – Jim James – Eternally Even (2016) Capitol / ATO
- Producer – John Legend – Darkness & Light (2016) Columbia
- Producer – John Legend featuring Cynthia Erivo "God Only Knows" (2016) Epic
- Producer – Jesca Hoop – Memories Are Now (2017) Sub Pop
- Producer – Laura Marling – Semper Femina (2017) More Alarming
- Producer – Perfume Genius – No Shape (2017) Matador
- Producer – Perfume Genius – Set My Heart on Fire Immediately (2020) Matador
- Producer – Pino Palladino & Blake Mills – Notes with Attachments (2021) New Deal / Verve
- Producer – Perfume Genius – Ugly Season (2022) Matador
- Producer – Jack Johnson – Meet the Moonlight (2022) Brushfire / Republic
- Producer – Marcus Mumford – Self-Titled (2022) Island
- Co-producer – Feist – Multitudes (2023) Polydor
- Producer – Perfume Genius – Glory (2025) Matador Records
- Producer - Japanese Breakfast – For Melancholy Brunettes (& Sad Women) (2025) Dead Oceans
- Producer - Lucy Dacus – Forever Is A Feeling (2025) Geffen
