= Wylie Gelber =

American musician & guitar maker, former bass guitarist of Dawes (b. 1988)

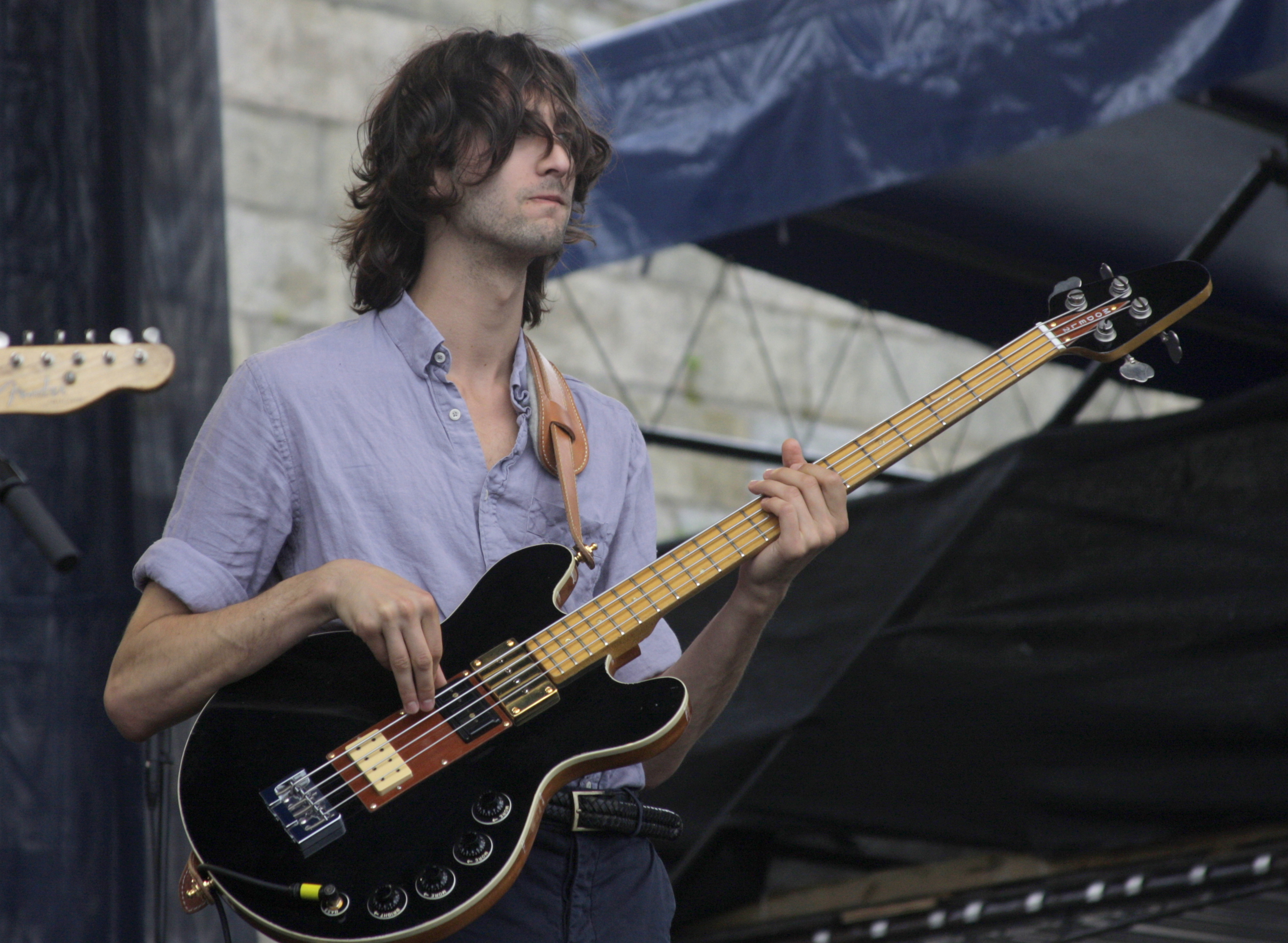
- Gelber at the Newport Folk Festival in 2014

Background information
- Born: May 13, 1988 (age 38); Los Angeles County, California, U.S.
- Genres: Folk rock, Indie rock
- Occupations: Bassist, guitar maker
- Instrument: Bass
- Years active: 2002–present
- Labels: HUB; Rounder; ATO

Wylie Gelber (born May 13, 1988) is an American musician, luthier, and craftsman. A founding member of the band Dawes, Gelber played bass in the band from 2009 to 2023, touring and playing on the band's first eight albums. As of 2025, Gelber runs Gelber & Sons, a Los Angeles-based studio that makes guitars, furniture, and other items.

== Career ==
=== Simon Dawes ===
Gelber dropped out of high school to tour as the bassist in the post-punk band Simon Dawes. The band broke up in 2007 when guitarist Blake Mills left.

=== Dawes ===
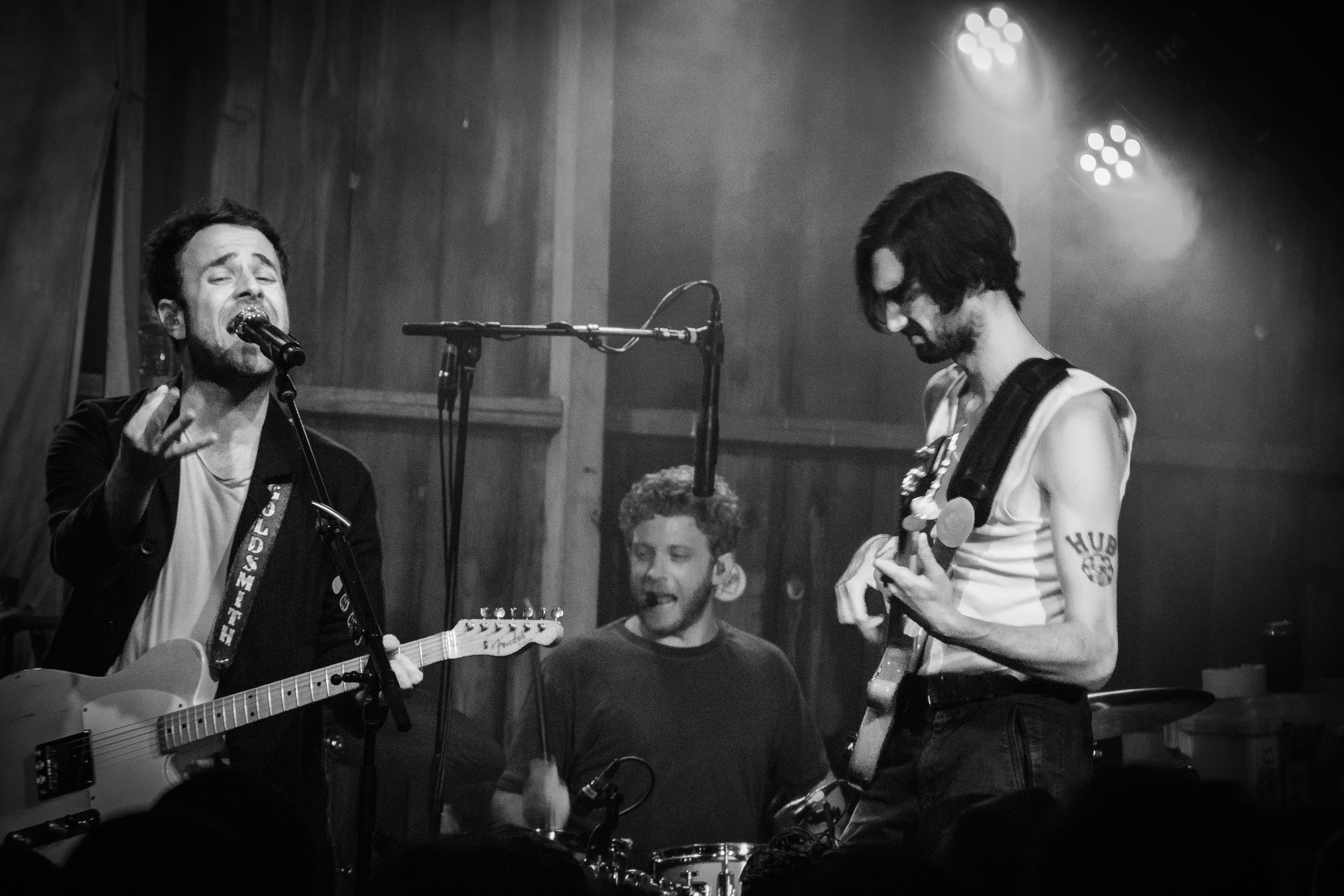
Dawes at Codfish Hollow Barnstormers, Maquoketa, IA 8/2/19

Following the break up of Simon Dawes, Gelber and former bandmates Griffin and Taylor Goldsmith formed the folk rock band Dawes, which released its first album, North Hills, in 2009. The band tours extensively and has released eight full-length studio albums.

In February 2023, it was announced on social media that Gelber would be departing the lineup following the band's spring tour dates to focus on other projects, including Gelber & Sons.

After playing with Dawes and Simon Dawes for 18+ years, Gelber played his final full gig with Dawes at the Theatre at the Ace Hotel Los Angeles on May 5th, 2023.

=== Gelber & Sons ===
Gelber operates Gelber & Sons, a Los Angeles-based studio that makes guitars, furniture, and other items.

== Personal life ==
Gelber lost his Altadena house in the 2025 Eaton Fire.
