= Taylor Goldsmith =

American musician (born 1985)

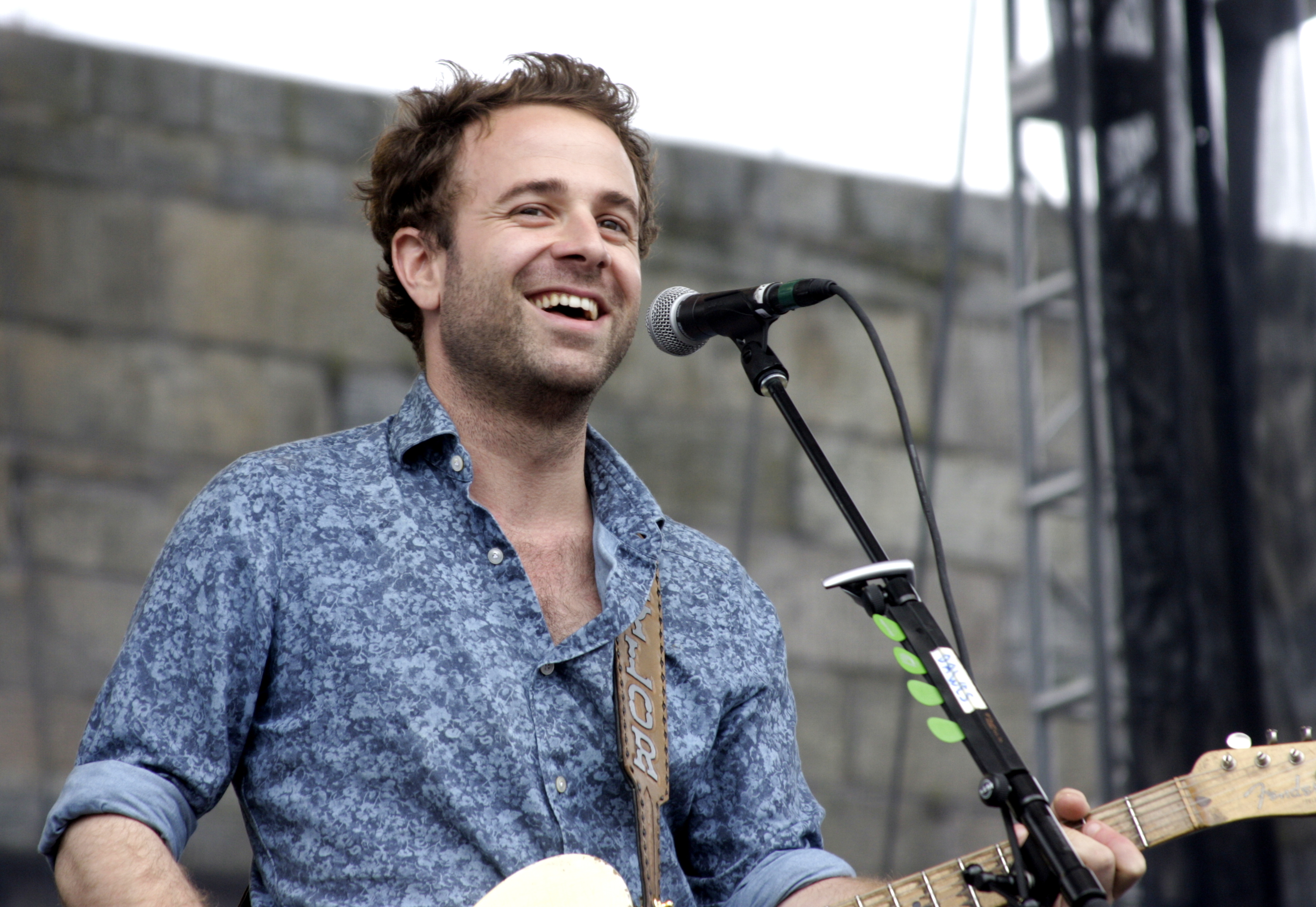
- Goldsmith at the Newport Folk Festival in 2014

Background information
- Born: Taylor Dawes Goldsmith; August 16, 1985 (age 41)
- Genre: Folk rock
- Occupations: Singer-songwriter; guitarist; record producer
- Instruments: Guitar; vocals; bass; keyboards
- Years active: 2002–present
- Label: HUB
- Member of: Dawes; Middle Brother; The New Basement Tapes; Rainbow Body
- Spouse: Mandy Moore (m. 2018)

Taylor Dawes Goldsmith (born August 16, 1985) is an American singer-songwriter, guitarist, and record producer. He serves as the lead singer, guitarist, and chief songwriter of American folk rock band Dawes.

== Early life ==
Goldsmith has a younger brother, Griffin. They were raised in southern California. He attended Malibu High School, where he was a classmate of Blake Mills. His father, Lenny Goldsmith, was a musician who toured as the lead singer of Tower of Power in the 1980s. He is Jewish.

== Career ==
=== Simon Dawes (2002–2007) ===
In 2002, Goldsmith formed a post-punk band called Simon Dawes with high school classmate and guitarist Blake Mills. Over the years, Goldsmith and Mills were joined by a shifting cast of bassists (Damon Webb, Grant Powell, and Wylie Gelber) and drummers (Alex Orbison, Dylan Grombacher, Stuart Johnson and Griffin Goldsmith). The band drew its name from the middle names of Goldsmith and Mills. Released in 2006, the band's debut album Carnivore received mixed reviews. Simon Dawes broke up in 2007 when Mills left the band.

=== Dawes (2009–present) ===
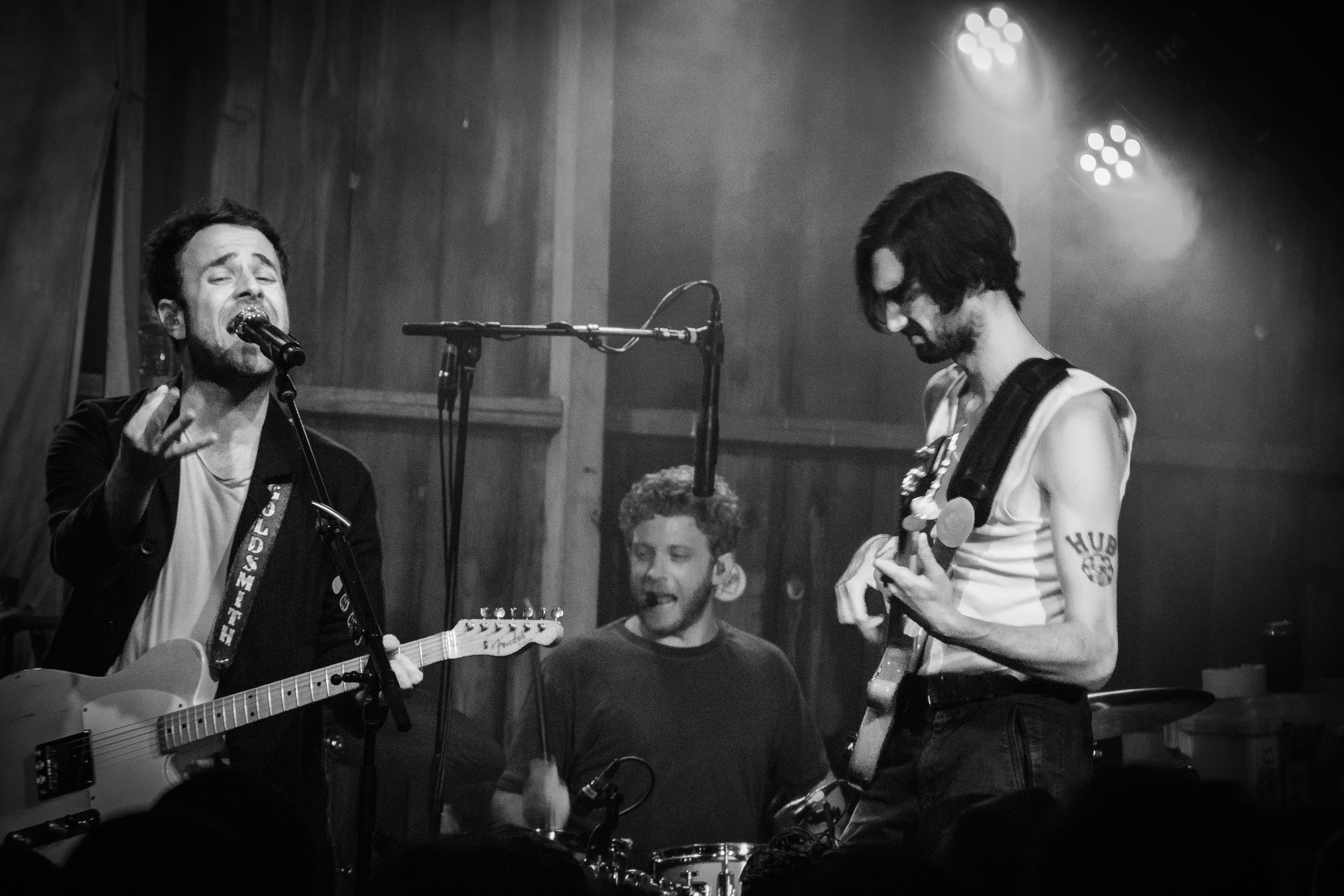
Taylor on guitar, Griffin Goldsmith on drums, and Wylie Gelber on bass - Dawes at Codfish Hollow Barnstormers, Maquoketa, IA 8/2/19

After the departure of Blake Mills from Simon Dawes, Goldsmith formed a new band called Dawes with his former bandmate Wylie Gelber (bass), his younger brother Griffin Goldsmith (drums)—both of Simon Dawes' last lineup—and new addition Tay Strathairn (keyboards). The band's first album, North Hills marked a sharp departure from the punk-inspired tunes of their youth and embraced a subtler folk rock that has been called the Laurel Canyon sound, reminiscent of Crosby, Stills, and Nash and Jackson Browne. Over the years, the band's lineup has shifted a bit, with keyboardist Straithairn leaving and being replaced by Alex Casnoff and later Lee Pardini. Guitarists Duane Betts and Trevor Menear in turn also joined the band for some of its tours. For all of the band's studio albums, Taylor Goldsmith has served as the band's front man, lead singer, chief songwriter, and lead guitarist.

=== Middle Brother (2010–2011) ===
In 2010, Goldsmith joined Matt Vasquez of Delta Spirit and John McCauley of Deer Tick to form the band Middle Brother. The band released its first and only album, Middle Brother, in March 2011 to positive reviews.

=== The New Basement Tapes (2014) ===
In 2014, Goldsmith was asked by producer T Bone Burnett to join a project called The New Basement Tapes that wrote and recorded songs based on recently uncovered lyrics written by Bob Dylan in 1967. Goldsmith joined Marcus Mumford of Mumford and Sons, Jim James of My Morning Jacket, Rhiannon Giddens of Carolina Chocolate Drops, and Elvis Costello during the recording sessions, which resulted in an album, Lost on the River: The New Basement Tapes, and a Showtime documentary, Lost Songs: The Basement Tapes Continued. Goldsmith received co-writing credit for the songs "Kansas City," "Liberty Street," "When I Get My Hands on You," "Florida Key," "Card Shark," and "Diamond Ring." He was also credited for playing bass, guitar, mellotron, organ, and piano, as well as for singing.

=== Rainbow Body (2026) ===
In 2026, Goldsmith released a self-titled album with a supergroup called Rainbow Body. Other members include Griffin Goldsmith, Rick Mitarotonda, Eric Krasno, Ross James, and Adam MacDougall.

=== Session work, songwriting, and producing ===
Apart from his primary projects, Goldsmith has also done work as a session musician. He has performed on albums by Jackson Browne, John Fogerty, Dave Rawlings, Mandy Moore, The Waterboys, and Sara Watkins, among others.

Goldsmith has also written and co-written songs for other bands, including songs on his wife Mandy Moore's album Silver Landings (2020), and then contributed to In Real Life (2022).

He has also contributed to Conor Oberst's Salutations, Brandon Flowers' The Desired Effect and Thrasher, and Robert Ellis' The Lights from the Chemical Plant.

In 2013, Goldsmith produced his first record, Dad Country by Jonny Fritz.

== Personal life ==
In 2015, Goldsmith began dating singer-songwriter and actress Mandy Moore. They became engaged in late 2017 and were married in Los Angeles on November 18, 2018. On February 12, 2021, Moore gave birth to their first child, a boy. On October 20, 2022, Moore gave birth to their second son. On May 31, 2024, the couple announced they were expecting their third child, a daughter, who was born in September 2024.
