= Sam Cohen (musician) =

American singer

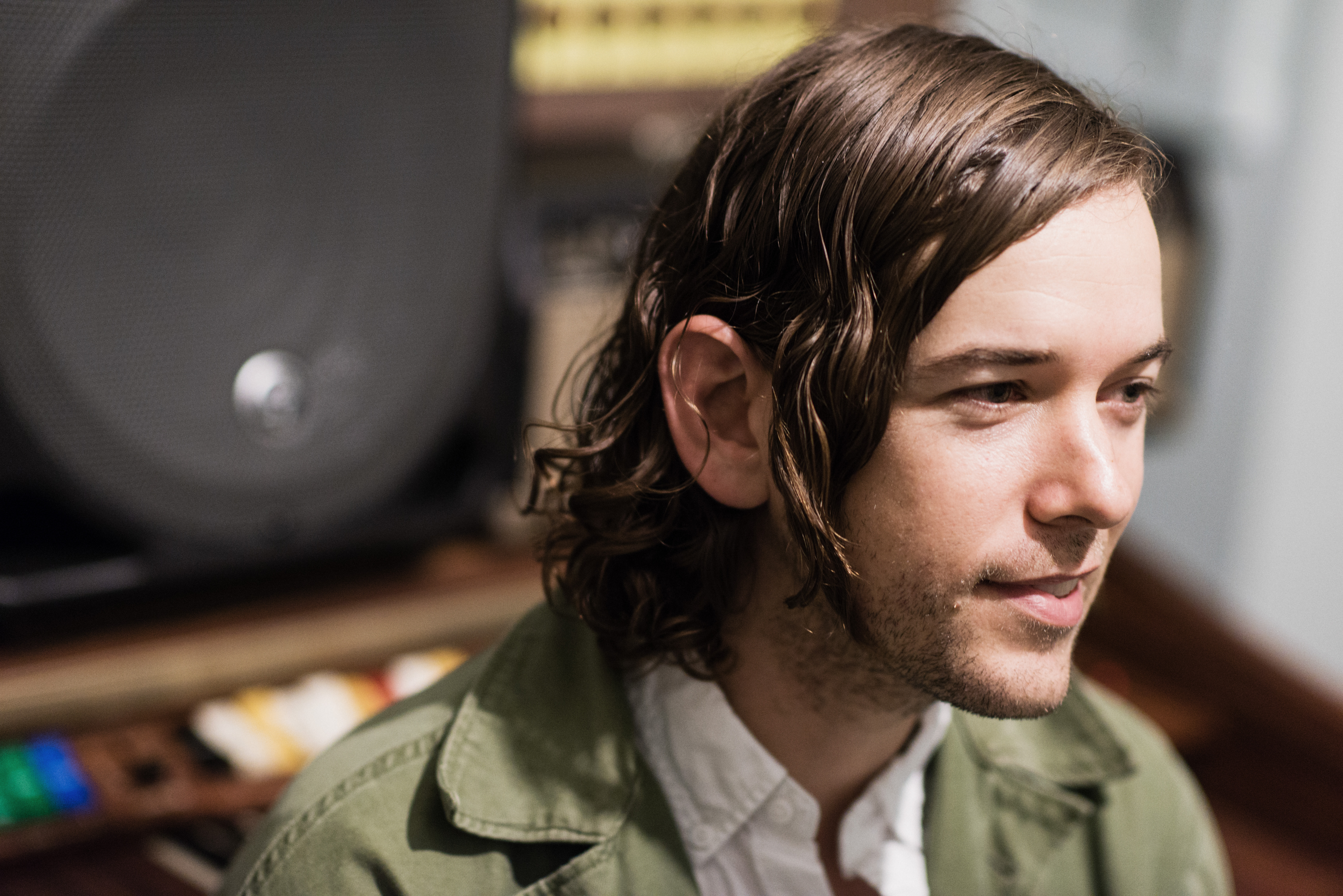
- Cohen in 2014

Background information
- Born: Samuel Benjamin Cohen; September 28, 1979 (age 47); Houston, Texas, U.S.
- Genres: Alternative rock; psychedelic rock; indie folk
- Occupations: Singer, songwriter, multi-instrumentalist, producer, musical director, visual artist
- Instruments: Vocals, guitar, drums, bass
- Years active: 1999–present
- Labels: 30th Century Records, Easy Sound Recording
- Website: www.yellowbirdsmusic.com

Samuel Benjamin Cohen (born September 28, 1979) is an American rock vocalist, songwriter, multi-instrumentalist, artist, and producer based in Brooklyn, New York. A founding member of the psychedelic rock and pop band Apollo Sunshine, he released several albums with the group in the early 2000s. In 2009 he formed the solo project Yellowbirds, releasing the debut album The Color in 2011. This release was followed by Songs from the Vanished Frontier in 2013. The first Sam Cohen record, Cool It, was released on April 28, 2015, on Easy Sound Records, and primary featured Cohen playing all of the instruments. It was then re-released on Danger Mouse's imprint of Columbia Records, 30th Century Records, on June 3, 2016. Cohen is also known for his original collages on the Yellowbirds album covers, and his collage animation videos.

Since 2008 Cohen has produced or contributed as a songwriter or musician to albums by Norah Jones, Shakira, Kevin Morby, Pavo Pavo, Dawn Landes, The Bandana Splits, Joseph Arthur, Trixie Whitley, and Walter Martin. In 2012, he was guitarist for The Bridge Session, a collaboration between The National and Grateful Dead's Bob Weir. From 2012 through 2014, he was the musical director for the concert The Complete Last Waltz, which featured artists such as Nels Cline, Cass McCombs, and members of Dr. Dog, among others.

== Early life ==
Cohen was born on September 28, 1979, in Houston, Texas, where he was also raised. He left Texas for Boston to attend college, meeting one of his future bandmates in 1997, where they were attending a Berklee College of Music summer performance program. While at Berklee, Cohen began focusing on audio engineering and record production.

== History ==
=== 2001–2009: Founding Apollo Sunshine ===
External videos
- Apollo Sunshine, "Singing To The Earth," a video collaboration between Cohen and his now wife Sarah Graves

He formed the psychedelic rock group Apollo Sunshine with Jesse Gallagher and Jeremy Black in 2001. The band released their first album, Katonah, in October 2003 on spinART Records. The album was recorded in Katonah, New York, in a barn which the band converted into a studio. It was well-received, earning 4/5 stars from Allmusic and 7.2/10 from Pitchfork Media. About their sound on the album The New York Times wrote that "bouncy 60's-style melodies crack wide open, breaking into outbursts of pummeling and feedback before jumping back into the tune. It's all neatly and cleverly plotted, but with a looming chaos that's anything but nostalgic." While also touring with the band, Cohen continued to collaborate in studio with other artists.

=== 2005–2009: Breakthrough albums ===
In 2005 Apollo Sunshine released the EP titled The Other Side of the World. The band released their second full-length album Apollo Sunshine on spinART Records in September 2005. In November 2005, it was named to the Amazon.com Best of 2005: Editors' Picks in Rock list at number 5, and the band was featured in Rolling Stone as an "Artist to Watch". The album received mixed to positive reviews, with Paste Magazine giving it 4/5, Pitchfork Media giving it 7.8/10, and PopMatters giving it 6/10.

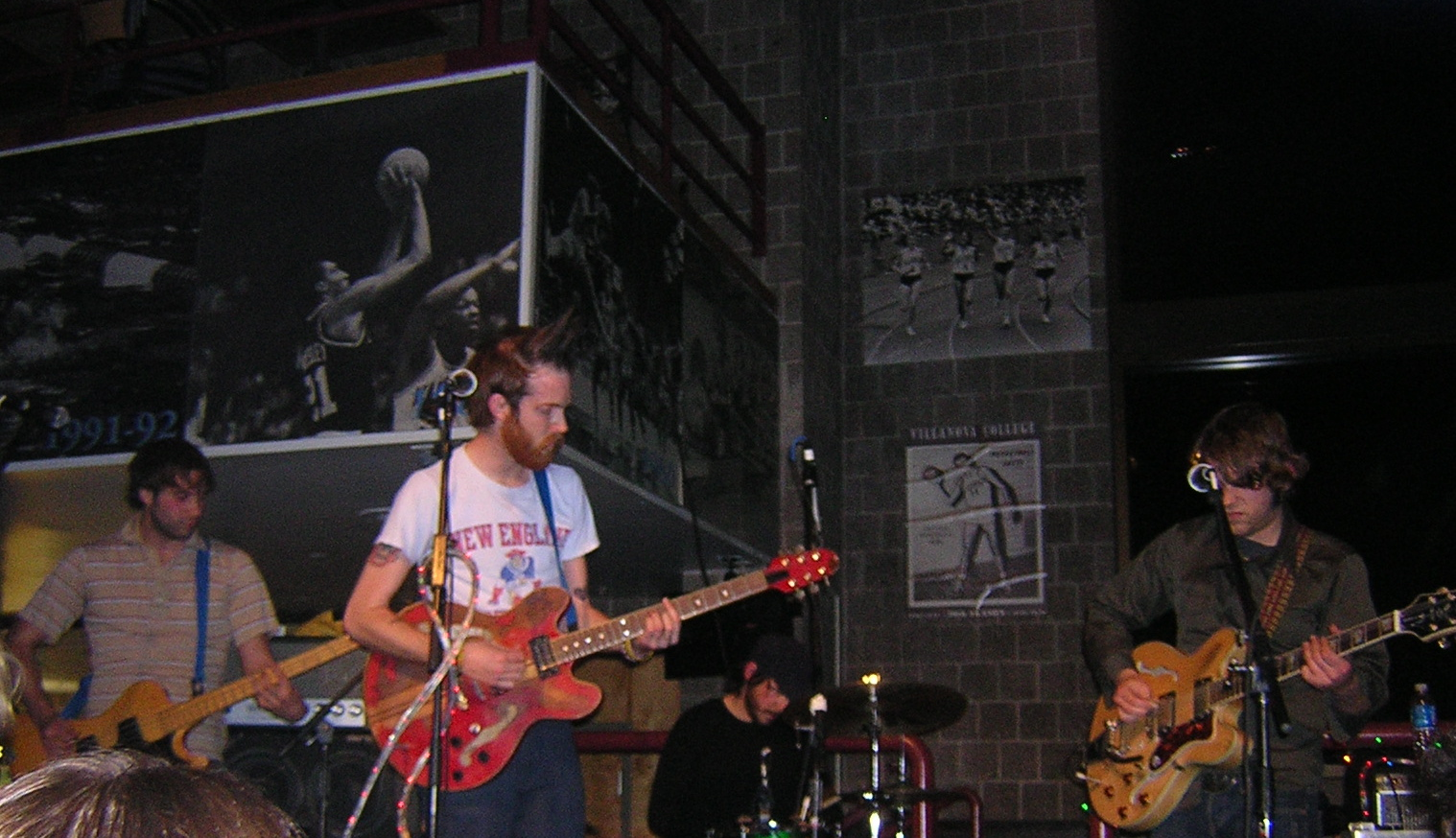
Apollo Sunshine performing around 2006, with Cohen on the right.

Shall Noise Upon is the 2008 album by Apollo Sunshine. It was released on vinyl and digital download on August 5, 2008. The record was recorded during the summer of 2007 in the Catskill Mountains, in a "house inhabited by spirits" and located next door to the home of the original Uncle Sam. The album includes Edan, and White Flight as guests. For the album the band received their highest score yet from Pitchfork Media, with 8.0/10. Allmusic gave it 3.5/5. The opening track, "Breeze", was featured near the end of the film Whip It, and appears on the movie soundtrack. The song "We Are Born When We Die", appeared on the TV show Breaking Bad, during the 12th episode of the fourth season.

=== 2009–2014: Yellowbirds ===
The band Yellowbirds was first formed in 2009 by Cohen as a solo project, shortly after the dissolution of Apollo Sunshine. Cohen began recording new music in his own bedroom studio. With the assistance of friends on several tracks, he released several singles in 2010. In February 2011 he released his debut album The Color as Yellowbirds, on Brooklyn indie label Royal Potato Family. It was well received by the majority of critics, with Ultimate Guitar calling the guitar work "magnificent." Early members included George Lewis Jr on bass (leader of Twin Shadow), Wynne Bennett on keys (also Twin Shadow), Max Koepke on rhythm guitar and autoharp (Self Righteous Brothers) and Brian Geltner on drums. Later on, Cohen, drummer Brian Kantor, multi-instrumentalist Josh Kaufman, and bassist Annie Nero made up a new lineup which remained consistent until disbanding in 2014.

In 2012 Cohen began writing songs for the band's sophomore album Songs from the Vanished Frontier, primarily writing on acoustic guitar. Released on May 5, 2013, it was also well received by critics, with Allmusic giving it 4/5 stars. Eric Danton of Rolling Stone gave it a positive review, writing that "the new songs have a hazy summertime feel on arrangements that surround Cohen's reverb-soaked vocals with jangling guitars, propulsive basslines and lush string charts." After playing a number of performances in the summer and fall of 2014, in locations such as Prospect Park in Brooklyn, Yellowbirds played their final show on November 1, 2014, at the Brooklyn venue Baby's All Right.

=== 2009–2014: Recent projects ===
As a session musician, Cohen has performed guitar on albums such as Norah Jones' The Fall in 2009. Also in 2009, he contributed vocals, guitar, and bass to Sweetheart Rodeo by singer-songwriter Dawn Landes, and in 2011 he produced the debut album by The Bandana Splits. He played pedal steel guitar on Get Me Home, a 2012 album by Russ Irwin. Cohen was the musical director for the concert The Complete Last Waltz in 2012 at The Warfield Theater and in 2013 at The Capitol Theatre. He remained as director through 2014, which featured artists such as Nels Cline, Cass McCombs, and members of Dr. Dog.

External videos
- Yellowbirds "Rest Of My Life", a video that took Cohen 10 weeks to complete
- "Rainsong" by Chad Stokes

In 2012, he was guitarist for The Bridge Session, a collaboration between The National and Grateful Dead's Bob Weir. Other projects include producing, engineering, and performing with several instruments the Blake Hazard album Eleanor Islands. Cohen also produced the single "Catch A Break" by Superhuman Happiness, and he produced and played on Solar Door by Mesiko. He has also played guitar with Alecia Chakour. In 2013 he played guitar on two tracks of Joseph Arthur's album The Ballad of Boogie Christ, and also played guitar on the 2013 Trixie Whitley album Fourth Corner. He contributed electric guitar to several tracks on an album by Walter Martin in 2014, also helping with engineering.

Cohen is also known for his original collages on the Yellowbirds album covers and his collage animation videos. The first Sam Cohen record, Cool It, will be out April 28, 2015, on Easy Sound Records, and will primarily feature Cohen playing all of the instruments. He released the first preview from the album, "Kepler 62", in November 2014 on Stereogum. Hilly Dilly described "Kepler 62" as "partly psychedelic and partly retro, but there's also a sprinkle of cosmic vibes interspersed within."

== Musical style ==
Cohen's solo material and various collaborations are often described as psychedelic in nature, with Apollo Sunshine a "neo-psychedelic/indie rock trio." According to Rolling Stone in 2013, Yellowbirds "mixes rock, folk and weird bits of R&B filtered through a psychedelic lens."

== Discography ==
=== Solo material ===
==== Albums ====
Albums by Sam Cohen
| Year | Album title | Release details |
|---|---|---|
| 2015 | Cool It | Released: April 28, 2015; Label: Easy Sound Recording Co |
| 2019 | The Future's Still Ringing In My Ears | Released: May 17, 2019; Label : 30th Century Records |

==== Singles ====
Singles by Sam Cohen
| Year | Title | Album | Release details |
|---|---|---|---|
| 2014 | "Kepler 62" | Promo single for Cool It | Easy Sound Records (Nov 2014) |
| 2016 | "Clockwork" | 30 Days, 30 Songs | Self-released (Oct 2016) |

=== With Apollo Sunshine ===
Studio albums by Apollo Sunshine
| Year | Album title | Release details |
|---|---|---|
| 2003 | Katonah | Released: October 7, 2003; Label: spinART |
| 2005 | Apollo Sunshine | Released: September 13, 2005; Label: spinART |
| 2008 | Shall Noise Upon | Released: August 5, 2008; Label: Headless Heroes |

=== With Yellowbirds ===
Studio albums by Yellowbirds
| Year | Album title | Release details |
|---|---|---|
| 2011 | The Color | Released: February 15, 2011; Label: Royal Potato Family |
| 2013 | Songs from the Vanished Frontier | Released: May 5, 2013; Label: Royal Potato Family |

=== Studio credits ===
Incomplete list of production credits for Sam Cohen
| Year | Release title | Artist(s) | Notes, role |
|---|---|---|---|
| 2005 | Stroke of Genius | Marc Black | Banjo, guitar (electric tenor, pedal steel), vocals |
| 2006 | The Songs of Bob Dylan | Various | Bass, guitar, vocals |
| 2007 | In Loving Memory | Self Righteous Brothers | Group member |
| 2009 | The Fall | Norah Jones | Electric guitar (tracks 1, 5, 9) |
| 2009 | Sweetheart Rodeo | Dawn Landes | Bass, guitars, vocals |
| 2009 | She Wolf | Shakira | Guitar |
| 2011 | The Bandana Splits | The Bandana Splits | Instrumentation, producer |
| 2012 | Get Me Home | Russ Irwin | Guitar, pedal steel guitar |
| 2013 | The Ballad of Boogie Christ | Joseph Arthur | Guitar (8 and 9) |
| 2013 | Fourth Corner | Trixie Whitley | Guitar |
| 2014 | Bob Dylan in the 80s: Volume One | Various | Engineer, guitar, vocals |
| 2014 | This Is the Town: A Tribute To Nilsson, Vol 1 | Various | Mixing, guitar, organ, vocals |
| 2014 | EDJ | EDJ | Guitar, synthesizer |
| 2014 | We're All Young Together | Walter Martin | Engineer, guitar (electric) |
| 2016 | Young Narrator in the Breakers | Pavo Pavo | Producer |
| 2016 | Singing Saw | Kevin Morby | Producer |
| 2019 | Oh My God | Kevin Morby | Producer |
| 2019 | Lux Prima | Karen O & Danger Mouse | Bass, Drums, Guitar, Synthesizer, Writer |
| 2020 | The Archer | Alexandra Savior | Producer |
| 2022 | This Is a Photograph | Kevin Morby | Producer |

== Direction credits ==
Selected theater credits for Sam Cohen
| Year | Show | Artist(s)/company | Role |
|---|---|---|---|
| 2012–2014 | The Complete Last Waltz | Various | Musical director, vocalist, musicians |

== See also ==
- List of guitarists
