= The Playboy of the Western World =

1907 play by Irish writer John Millington Synge

The Playboy of the Western World is a three-act play written by Irish playwright John Millington Synge, first performed at the Abbey Theatre, Dublin, on 26 January 1907. The work is considered a centerpiece of the Irish Literary Revival movement and influenced numerous other writers of the period, but was initially met with riots and protests in Dublin when it first premiered. It is set in Michael James Flaherty's public house in County Mayo during the early 1900s, and tells the story of Christy Mahon, a young man running away from his farm, claiming he killed his father.

The play is known for its use of the poetic, evocative language of Hiberno-English, heavily influenced by the Irish language, as Synge celebrates the lyrical speech of the Irish. It remains a popular piece of literature in Ireland, and has been adapted for theatre musicals, plays, and films.

== Characters ==
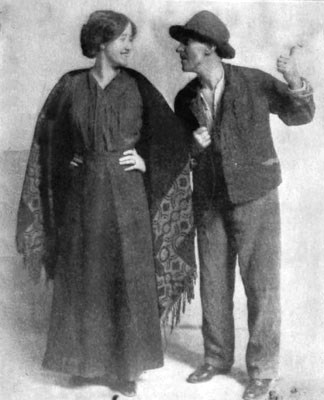
Irish actors Sara Allgood ("Widow Quin") and J. M. Kerrigan ("Shawn Keogh"), in The Playboy of the Western World, Plymouth Theatre, Boston, 1911

- Christy Mahon, a man who brags he has killed his father
- Old Mahon, Christy's father, a squatter
- Michael James Flaherty, a publican
- Margaret Flaherty, called Pegeen Mike, Michael's daughter and the barmaid
- Shawn Keogh, a young man who loves Pegeen
- Widow Quin, a widow of about thirty
- Philly Cullen and Jimmy Farrell, farmers
- Sara Tansey, Susan Brady, Honor Blake, and Nelly, village girls
- A Bellman
- Some peasants and farmers

== Synopsis ==
On the west coast of County Mayo Christy Mahon comes into Flaherty's tavern. He claims that he is on the run because he killed his father by driving a loy into his head. Everyone is impressed by Christy's boldness, and Flaherty's daughter (and barmaid), Pegeen, falls in love with Christy, to the dismay of her suitor, Shawn Keogh. Because of the novelty of Christy's exploits and the skill with which he tells his story, he becomes something of a town hero. Other women also become attracted to him, including the Widow Quin, who tries unsuccessfully to seduce Christy at Shawn's behest. Christy also impresses the village with his victory in a donkey race, using the slowest beast.

Eventually Christy's father, Mahon, who had actually only been wounded, tracks him to the tavern. When the townsfolk realize that Christy's father is alive, everyone, including Pegeen, shuns him as a liar and a coward. To regain Pegeen's love and the respect of the town, Christy attacks his father a second time. This time it seems that Old Mahon really is dead, but instead of praising Christy, the townspeople, led by Pegeen, bind and prepare to hang him to avoid being implicated as accessories to murder. Christy's life is saved when his father, beaten and bloodied, crawls back onto the scene, having improbably survived his son's second attack. The two condemn the villagers' hypocrisy and leave to wander the world, their roles now reversed; Christy as "master" and his father subordinate. Shawn eagerly states that he and Pegeen can now be married, but she spurns him. Pegeen laments betraying and losing Christy: "I've lost the only playboy of the western world."

== Riots ==
Riots occurred in January 1907 during and following the opening performance of the play. The disturbances were provoked by Irish nationalists and republicans who viewed the contents of the play as an offence to public morals and an insult against Ireland. The riots spread through Dublin, originating from the Abbey, and were eventually subdued by the Dublin Metropolitan Police.

The play's theme of apparent patricide further intensified public hostility. Nationalist figures, including Arthur Griffith, condemned the work for its supposed immorality and lack of patriotism, describing it as "a vile and inhuman story told in the foulest language we have ever listened to from a public platform". A particular line "a drift of chosen females standing in their shifts, maybe" was perceived as offensive to Irish women, sparking renewed outrage. As protests escalated, much of the remaining performance had to be mimed. However, public opinion soon shifted, with newspapers criticising the rioters, leading the unrest to subside.

Years later, when Seán O'Casey's The Plough and the Stars provoked similar protests, W. B. Yeats rebuked the rioters by referencing the Playboy incident, declaring: "You have disgraced yourself again. Is this to be the recurring celebration of the arrival of Irish genius?"

Synge's play also faced opposition abroad. During its 1911 U.S. tour, performances were disrupted in New York by hecklers who booed, hissed, and threw vegetables and stink bombs. Subsequent performances in Philadelphia led to the cast's arrest on charges of staging an immoral play, though the charges were later dismissed.

== Performances ==
The play was staged by the Edinburgh Gateway Company in March 1957, with Norman Fraser playing Christy and George Davies playing his father.

The National Theatre company also staged this play at the Old Vic theatre in London around the late 1960s.

In 1995, a production at Boise State University was directed by Richard Klautsch. It starred Roger Titmus, Isaac Perelson, Randy Davison, Sam Read and Sally Eames.

In the summer of 2005, the Druid Theatre Company of Galway presented all six plays of John Millington Synge. The production of Playboy starred Maeliosa Stafford as Christy Mahon and Bríd Brennan as Pegeen Mike.

In September 2007, the play returned to the Abbey in a modern adaptation by Bisi Adigun and Roddy Doyle. Set in a suburb of West Dublin, it tells the story of Christopher Malomo, a Nigerian refugee who claims to have killed his father with a pestle. In 2011, The Old Vic, in London, played host to a classic adaptation directed by John Crowley starring Robert Sheehan, Niamh Cusack and Ruth Negga.

In December 2025, a new production opened in the National Theatre (Lyttelton Theatre) in London, directed by Caitríona McLaughlin and starring Nicola Coughlan, Éanna Hardwicke and Siobhán McSweeney.

== Adaptations ==
=== Theatrical ===
In 1912, Sil-Vara and Charles H. Fisher translated the play into German as Der Held (literally 'hero') des Westerlands or Der Held der westlichen Welt and had it published by Georg Müller and performed at Max Reinhardt's Kammerspiele, Berlin, at the Neue Wiener Bühne in Vienna and at the Stadttheater in Münster.

In 1973, the Irish-language national theatre group Taibhdhearc na Gaillimhe produced an adaptation in the Irish language by Seán Ó Carra entitled Buachaill Báire an Domhain Thiar.

The play was adapted in 1984 by Trinidadian playwright Mustapha Matura, lifted out of turn-of-the-century Ireland and set down in 1950s Trinidad, and retitled Playboy of the West Indies.

In 2006, a Mandarin Chinese version of the play set in a hairdressers shop in a Beijing suburb was performed at the Beijing Oriental Theatre. It was produced by the Irish contemporary theatre company Pan Pan. The play attracted controversy when a member of the audience complained about the shortness of the skirt worn by Sha Sha, playing the Sarah Tansey character. Following the complaint, the play was attended by two policemen.

=== Operatic and musical ===
In 1975, Giselher Klebe's operatic adaption Ein wahrer Held (A True Hero) premiered at the Zurich Opera House. A 2003 operatic rendition by Mark Alburger was produced from 23 to 26 August 2007 by Goat Hall Productions/SF Cabaret Opera at Oakland Metro Opera House in Oakland, California. A musical theatre version, written by Kate Hancock and Richard B. Evans, premiered at the STAGES 2005 musical festival at the Theatre Building Chicago. In 2009, a musical adaptation entitled Golden Boy of the Blue Ridge premiered in New York City. With music by Peter Mills and a book by Peter Mills and Cara Reichel, the musical transplants the story to 1930s Appalachia and is set to a bluegrass-flavoured score.

There is a song by American singer-songwriter Connie Converse, on her first album How Sad, How Lovely, that shares a name with the play.

=== Film and television ===
A 1962 film version of the play was produced in Ireland, with the screenplay by writer-director Brian Desmond Hurst. It stars Siobhán McKenna as Pegeen, Gary Raymond as Christy, and Elspeth March as Widow Quin, with music by Seán Ó Riada.

London weekday ITV contractor Associated-Rediffusion made a production of the play for schools, in three parts plus an introduction to the history of the period, which aired in February and March 1964.

A 1994 TV movie adaptation was entitled Paris or Somewhere. Set in rural Saskatchewan, it starred Callum Keith Rennie as Christy Mahon, a young American farmer who arrives in town and claims to have killed his father. He charms the town with his story, particularly Peg (Molly Parker), the daughter of a local store owner and bootlegger. The screenplay was written by novelist Lee Gowan. A film adaptation was also made in 2016. Set in the US and titled, My Father Die, it was written and directed by Sean Brosnan.

In June 2018, a new feature-length film production entitled Christy Mahon – Playboy of the Western World was registered by Swiss producers on IMDb. Filming will be in Bray, Ireland and scheduled for late October / November 2019. The producers procured a print of the play from a notebook version of the text published in 1912 and upon which they based their screenplay.

== Reputed inspiration ==
While based in a fictional shebeen (unlicensed pub) in the Geesala area of County Mayo, some of the characters and events in the play are partially based on a true story which was reputedly recounted to Synge by an old man from the Aran Islands. According to Synge, the character of Christy Mahon, the "savage hero" of the play, was at least partially based on a convicted criminal who assaulted a woman on Achill Island in the late 19th century.

This man, James Lynchehaun (c.1864-1937) from Tonregee townland on the Corraun peninsula, brutally assaulted his English employer, Mrs Agnes MacDonnell, at her home on Achill Island on 6 October 1894. He reportedly "burned [her] from ankle to knee, fractured her skull with a stone, knocked out one eye, bit her nose off and kicked thorns from a whin bush deep into her vagina" after burning down her home, Valley House, on an 800 hectare property. He was arrested, convicted, sentenced to lifetime penal servitude, escaped, sheltered by locals from the police for a while, recaptured (after a £300 bounty for his recapture was placed), imprisoned for seven years before escaping again, making his way to the United States. He became something of a folk-hero in the US, falsely claiming his actions had been political and carried out on behalf of the Irish Republican Brotherhood, until Irish nationalist Michael Davitt publicly referred to him as a "murderer" and refused to shake his hand, as did Douglas Hyde. (Davitt may have been under the mistaken impression that Mrs MacDonnell had died. She survived, albeit disfigured and forced to wear a veil when out in public, dying in 1923 after rebuilding Valley House.)

Efforts by the British authorities to have Lynchehaun extradited were rebuffed by American politicians and courts including the United States Supreme Court. President Teddy Roosevelt was then recruited [by Lynchehaun's supporters] to prevent his deportation. In a landmark court case in Indianapolis, where Lynchehaun had settled, Charles Washington Moores Jr. (1862–1923), US Commissioner, "ruled that Lynchehaun's crime in Achill was a political one and the prisoner could, therefore, not be extradited. 'Let the prisoner be discharged', he ordered". Vice-president Charles W. Fairbanks visited Lynchehaun to tell him the news. Lynchehaun later visited Ireland twice, being deported the second time. He ultimately left his family in Indianapolis to wind up living in Glasgow. He died in Girvan, Scotland in 1937.

== Quotations ==
- "... it's great luck and company I've won me in the end of time—two fine women fighting for the likes of me—till I'm thinking this night wasn't I a foolish fellow not to kill my father in the years gone by." —Christy
- "Drink a health to the wonders of the western world, the pirates, preachers, poteen-makers, with the jobbing jockies; parching peelers, and the juries fill their stomachs selling judgments of the English law." —Sara Tansey
- "It's well you know what call I have. It's well you know it's a lonesome thing to be passing small towns with the lights shining sideways when the night is down, or going in strange places with a dog noising before you and a dog noising behind, or drawn to the cities where you'd hear a voice kissing and talking deep love in every shadow of the ditch, and you passing on with an empty, hungry stomach failing from your heart." —Christy
- "A daring fellow is the jewel of the world...." —Michael Flaherty
- "...the blow of a loy, have taught me that there's a great gap between a gallous story and a dirty deed." —Pegeen Mike
- "You've turned me a likely gaffer in the end of all, the way I'll go romancing through a romping lifetime, from this hour to the dawning of the Judgment Day." —Christy
- "Oh my grief, I've lost him surely. I've lost the only Playboy of the Western World." —Pegeen Mike
