= Yellowbirds =

Former American Indie rock band

- Origin: Brooklyn, New York
- Genres: Indie rock, psychedelic rock
- Years active: 2009–2014
- Label: Royal Potato Family
- Past members: Sam Cohen, Brian Kantor, Josh Kaufman, Annie Nero, George Lewis Jr, Wynne Bennett, Max Koepke, Brian Geltner
- Website: YellowbirdsMusic.com

Yellowbirds was an American indie rock band active from 2009 to late 2014. It was first formed by guitarist, vocalist, and songwriter Sam Cohen as a solo project, shortly after the dissolution of Cohen's band Apollo Sunshine. After Yellowbirds' debut album release The Color in 2011, their sophomore album Songs from the Vanished Frontier was released in 2013. According to Rolling Stone in 2013, the band "mixes rock, folk and weird bits of R&B filtered through a psychedelic lens."

== History ==
=== 2009–2012: Founding, first releases ===
The band Yellowbirds was first formed in 2009 by Sam Cohen, shortly after the dissolution of Cohen's psychedelic pop and rock band Apollo Sunshine. Cohen, a guitarist, vocalist, and songwriter, began recording new music in its own bedroom studio. With the assistance of friends on several tracks, he released several singles in 2010. In 2011 he released his debut album The Color as Yellowbirds. It was released on Brooklyn indie label, Royal Potato Family in February 2011. Early members included George Lewis Jr on bass (leader of Twin Shadow), Wynne Bennett on keys (also Twin Shadow), Max Koepke on rhythm guitar and autoharp (Self Righteous Brothers) and Brian Geltner on drums. Later members included Cohen, drummer Brian Kantor, multi-instrumentalist Josh Kaufman, and bassist Annie Nero.

=== 2013–2014: Songs from the Vanished Frontier ===
In 2013 Cohen began writing songs for the band's sophomore album Songs from the Vanished Frontier, primarily using acoustic guitar. It received a positive review from Eric R Danton of Rolling Stone in May, who wrote that the band "mixes rock, folk and weird bits of R&B filtered through a psychedelic lens."

After a number of performances in the summer and fall of 2014 in locations such as Prospect Park in Brooklyn, Yellowbirds played their final show on November 1, 2014, at the Brooklyn venue Baby's All Right.

== Members ==
Past

- Sam Cohen (2009–2014) – vocals, guitar
- Brian Kantor (~2012–2014) – drums
- Josh Kaufman (~2012–2014) – multi-instrumentalist
- Annie Nero (~2012–2014) – bass
- George Lewis Jr (~2009–2012) – on bass
- Wynne Bennett (~2009–2012) – keys
- Max Koepke (~2009–2012) – rhythm guitar and autoharp
- Brian Geltner (~2009–2012) – drums

== Discography ==
=== Albums ===
Studio albums by Yellowbirds
Year	Album title	Release details
2011	The Color	Released: Feb 15, 2011; Label: Royal Potato Family; Format: CD, digital
2013	Songs from the Vanished Frontier	Released: May 5, 2013; Label: Royal Potato Family; Format: CD, vinyl, digital

=== Singles ===
Selected songs by Yellowbirds
Year	Title	Album	Release details
2010	"The Rest of My Life"	Single	Self-released (Oct 12, 2010)
2010	"The Honest Ocean"	Single only	Self-released (Nov 2010)
