= Alexandra Savior =

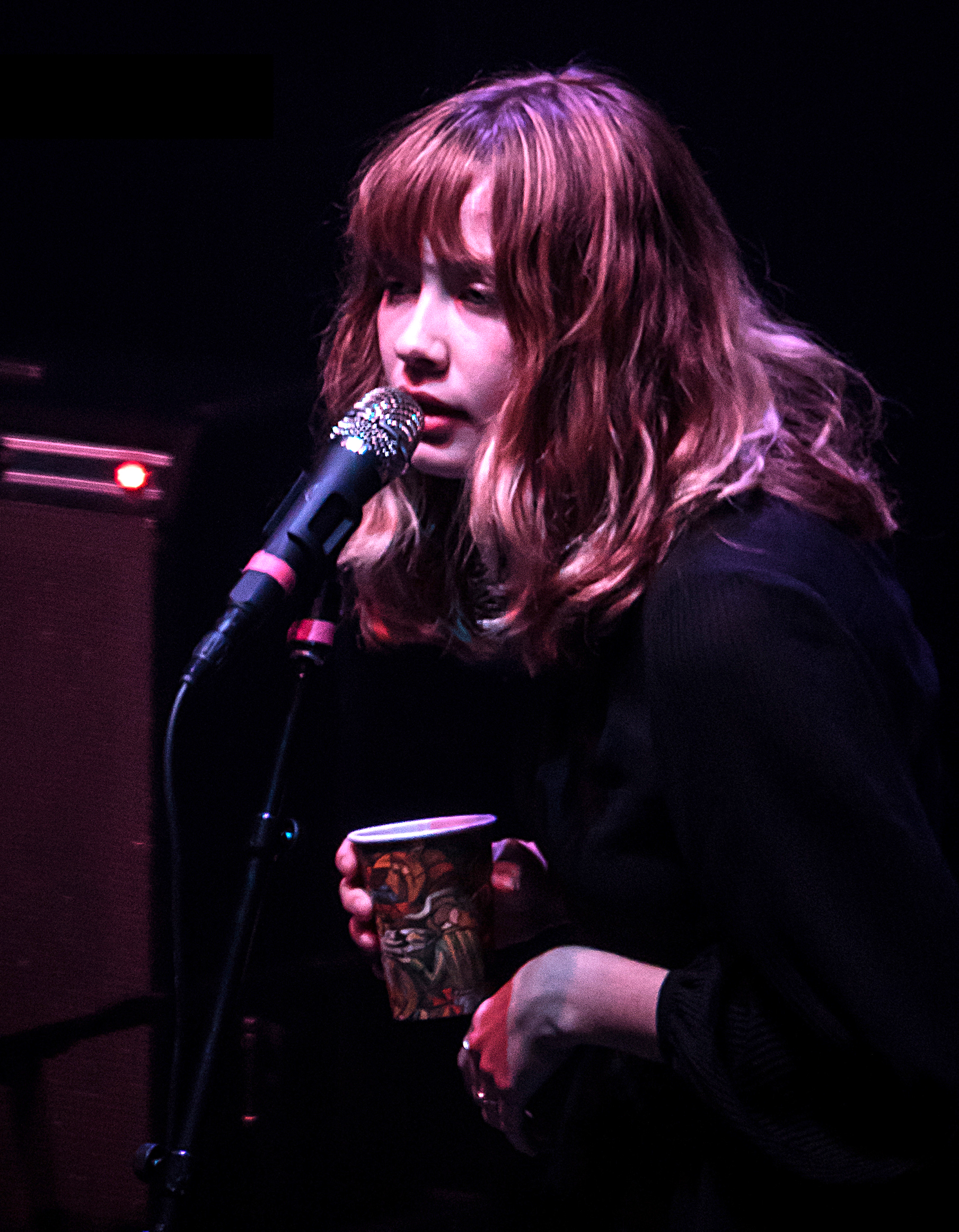
- Savior performing at the Wiltern, 2016

Background information
- Also known as: Alexandra Semitone
- Born: Alexandra Savior McDermott; June 14, 1995 (age 31); Portland, Oregon, U.S.
- Genres: Dream pop; chamber pop; desert rock; indie rock; psychedelic rock
- Occupation: Singer-songwriter
- Instruments: Vocals; guitar
- Years active: 2013–present
- Labels: Columbia; 30th Century; RCA Records
- Website: alexandrasavior.com

Alexandra Savior McDermott (born June 14, 1995) is an American singer-songwriter originally from Portland, Oregon. Savior first came to public notice at age 17 in 2012 after Courtney Love publicly lauded her performance of covers on YouTube. Shortly after graduating high school in 2013, Savior pursued a music career in Los Angeles, and was signed to Columbia Records later that year, after which she began recording material with producers James Ford and Alex Turner. Her debut studio album, Belladonna of Sadness, was released on April 7, 2017, by Columbia Records.

After being dropped by Columbia Records in 2019, Savior was signed to Danger Mouse's independent label, 30th Century Records, who released her second studio album, The Archer, on January 10, 2020. The album was met with critical acclaim. In June 2024, Savior announced her signing with RCA Records. Her third studio album, Beneath the Lilypad, was released by RCA on May 16, 2025.

== Early life ==
Alexandra Savior McDermott was born on June 14, 1995, in Portland, Oregon. Her mother was diagnosed with cervical cancer when she was pregnant with Savior but during her pregnancy she was cured. Because of this event, her father chose “Savior” as her middle name. She has one older brother.

Savior was raised in Vancouver, Washington. At age 12, her parents divorced, and her father relocated to New Orleans, Louisiana. She first became interested in songwriting at age 14, in part inspired by her older brother, also a musician. Savior grew up listening to "a lot of soul and grunge", including her father's records by artists such as Pearl Jam, Otis Redding, and Jimi Hendrix. As a teenager, she was also an admirer of Jack White, Etta James, and The Velvet Underground. She began taking singing lessons as a teenager. As a student, Savior struggled socially and had to change high schools due to being bullied by peers. Savior has bipolar I disorder.

== Career ==
=== 2013–2018: Early work and debut studio album ===
Savior first achieved public attention in September 2012 at age 17 after rock singer-songwriter Courtney Love publicly complimented her after viewing a cover of Angus & Julia Stone's "Big Jet Plane" that Savior had uploaded on YouTube. "She’s going to be huge," Love declared. "I am not ever wrong when it comes to spotting talent." Love began corresponding with Savior by email and, eventually, by phone. "She called me up," Savior recalled. "We had a land line at my house, and the phone was shaped like a big tomato. So she would call me on the tomato phone, and I would sit in the kitchen and we would talk and talk. She gave me good advice. She told me not to let anybody turn me into a puppet."

It’s hard to have people try to mold you into a version of what they find sellable, or a version of somebody else, or a version of everybody else. When I was 16 I went to a record label … I did a showcase and sang them three of my songs. Afterwards they sat me on a stool and asked me, “Do you want to be like Pink or Katy Perry?” And I thought, “Oh, what have I gotten myself into?”

— Savior on her difficulties navigating the music industry, 2016

By April 2013, Savior had done some modeling for Erin Fetherston and said she hoped her first album would be out soon. She graduated from high school in June 2013 and had plans to attend art school, but opted instead to relocate to Los Angeles and pursue a music career. "I moved to an apartment in Hollywood behind a strip club called the Seventh Veil," she commented. "It was terrifying. I got signed about a month later. I moved immediately." Around September 2013, Savior was signed to a recording contract by Columbia Records, which she later admitted she was not prepared for artistically or socially. Despite this, she stated that Columbia was the best choice given that other labels were interested in modeling her after established pop artists such as Katy Perry or Pink. In October 2013, Linda Perry was publicly comparing Savior's potential to that of Fiona Apple.

In 2014, Savior began writing and recording her material for her debut studio album in Los Angeles with James Ford of The Last Shadow Puppets and Alex Turner of Arctic Monkeys as producers. The album initially had the working title Strange Portrait, but was retitled Belladonna of Sadness after the 1973 Japanese anime of the same name. Savior initially planned to release the album under the stage name Alexandra Semitone, but Turner advised her to change her name and use her middle name as the last. "Miracle Aligner", a song written by Savior and Turner during the recording sessions, though cut from the album, was re-recorded by Turner's band the Last Shadow Puppets and later featured on their 2016 album, Everything You've Come to Expect.

Belladonna of Sadness was mostly completed by June 2015, during which time Savior gave limited concert appearances, usually before industry audiences in the media capitals of Los Angeles, New York, and London. These appearances utilized members of the musical group PAPA as backing musicians. Speaking of the album's pending release in October 2016, Savior said: "It's been very difficult... The most important thing about the music industry I've learnt is that it's total bullshit, and that the thing you should focus on the most is just the art."

In 2015, a demo from the album, "Risk", was featured on the soundtrack of the second season of the television show True Detective. Savior subsequently released a series of singles from the album, beginning with "Shades" on June 17, 2016, followed by "M.T.M.E." on September 8, 2016. Reviewing "M.T.M.E.", the British newspaper NME wrote: "The striking and smoky vocals belong solely to Savior and ooze a burgeoning star power well beyond her tender age of 21." A third single, "Mystery Girl" was released on November 21, 2016, alongside an announcement of the album's upcoming release. Savior was also featured as a guest vocalist on the song "Providence Sky" by Brooklyn-based music project Dark Tea, released in December 2016. "Mirage", the fourth and final promotional single for Savior's forthcoming album, was released on February 3, 2017. Paintings by Savior were used for the covers of some of the single releases, with accompanying self-directed music videos. During the winter of 2017, Savior supported Hamilton Leithauser as an opening act for his West Coast tour dates.

Belladonna of Sadness was officially released on April 7, 2017, by Columbia Records. It received generally favorable reviews from critics, and was named one of the 30 best albums of the year by The Independent. Shortly after the album's release, Savior appeared on Lea Michele's 2017 album Places as co-writer of the track "Sentimental Memories".

=== 2019–present: Label transitions ===
After the release of Belladonna of Sadness, Savior submitted demos to Columbia for her second album, but the label rejected them before dropping her after her manager quit. Savior said this was a difficult time for her as she felt Columbia's termination of her record contract marked a significant failure, and possibly the end of her career. Savior left Los Angeles and returned to Portland to live with her mother. While attending community college, she was asked by producer Danger Mouse to record vocals for the Broken Bells track "Good Luck", which was released in September 2019.

James Mercer of Broken Bells and The Shins subsequently requested Savior's demos, and she was soon signed to Danger Mouse's independent label, 30th Century Records. She began recording new material with producer Sam Cohen in New York City in November 2019. In June 2019, two years after releasing Belladonna of Sadness, Savior returned with the lead single from her second studio album, The Archer, titled "Crying All the Time". It was released on June 14, 2019. The song was made available on music streaming platforms through 30th Century Records. Following the release of three additional singles, The Archer, was released by 30th Century Records on January 10, 2020. A limited run of vinyl LP versions of the album were independently produced and made available for sale on Savior's official website. The album was well-received by critics, earning an 84% approval rating on review aggregator Metacritic based on 4 reviews, signifying "universal acclaim".

In a 2021 interview, Savior revealed she had been working on composing a third album, and was in the process of writing guitar-based songs. She reflected on her career thus far:

It’s been almost ten years since I began making music and there is some sort of loneliness in me and my songs. The fact that I cannot financially support myself seems like a failure, but it’s also the influence of expectations, both mine and the ones which came from the outside world. It makes me feel like I’m in downtime, that I am failing because in the music industry you live in constant highs and lows. One month your new record gets its premiere, you have interviews, people are interested. Next month no one gives a shit and you have to move on. Then you work three years on the new album and you have this feeling of being unsure if the public is going to like your new record. Everything can collapse in a second. In the end, you’re left with some sort of crash.

Savior's third studio album, Beneath the Lilypad, was released by RCA Records on May 16, 2025.

== Influences ==
Savior has cited several singer-songwriters as musical influences, including Connie Converse, Karen Dalton, and Sibylle Baier, commenting that she was inspired by artists "who have life stories."

== Discography ==
=== Studio albums ===
- Belladonna of Sadness (2017)
- The Archer (2020)
- Beneath the Lilypad (2025)

=== Singles ===
Year	Title	Album
2016	"Shades"	Belladonna of Sadness
2016	"M.T.M.E."	Belladonna of Sadness
2016	"Mystery Girl"	Belladonna of Sadness
2017	"Mirage"	Belladonna of Sadness
2017	"Vanishing Point"	Belladonna of Sadness
2017	"Bones"	Belladonna of Sadness
2019	"Crying All the Time"	The Archer
2019	"Saving Grace"	The Archer
2019	"The Archer"	The Archer
2019	"Howl"	The Archer
2025	"Unforgivable"	Beneath the Lilypad
2025	"The Mothership"	Beneath the Lilypad

== Personal life ==
Savior has been in a relationship with producer Drew Erickson since June 2019.
