= Fireproof (disambiguation) =

Fireproof means resistant to damage from fire.

Fireproof may also refer to:

== Music ==
- Fireproof (Dawn Landes album), 2008
- Fireproof (Pillar album) or the title song, 2003
- Fireproof (That Petrol Emotion album), 1993
- "Fireproof" (Coleman Hell song), 2016
- "Fireproof", a song by One Direction from Four, 2014
- Fireproof Recording, a New York City recording studio

== Other uses ==
- Fireproof (film), a 2008 American Christian drama film
- Fireproof Building, a historic structure in Charleston, South Carolina
- Fireproof Studios, a British video game art studio and developer
- XXXchurch.com or Fireproof Ministries, a non-profit Christian website

== See also ==
- List of fire-retardant materials
