= Mystery Girl (disambiguation) =

Mystery Girl is an album by Roy Orbison.

Mystery Girl(s) or The Mystery Girl may also refer to:

== Film and television ==
- The Mystery Girl, a lost 1918 American silent film directed by William C. deMille
- Mystery Girl (The Naked Brothers Band), a 2008 television film featuring the Naked Brothers Band
- Mystery Girls, a 2014 American television sitcom

== Music ==
- "Mystery Girl" (song), by Alexandra Savior, 2016
- "Mystery Girl", a song by Atlantic Starr from Radiant, 1981
- "Mystery Girl", a song by Brad Whitford and Derek St. Holmes from Whitford/St. Holmes, 1981
- "Mystery Girl", a song by Jess Conrad, 1961
- "Mystery Girl", a song by Yeah Yeah Yeahs from Yeah Yeah Yeahs, 2001
- The pseudonym for Princess Stéphanie of Monaco on the Michael Jackson song "In the Closet" featuring her

== See also ==
- His Mystery Girl, a 1923 American silent film directed by Robert F. Hill
