= Howard Fishman =

American writer and singer

- Born: Hartford, Connecticut, United States
- Origin: Brooklyn, New York, United States
- Genres: Jazz, blues, rock, folk-pop, New Orleans jazz, country, funk, gospel, Avant-garde music
- Occupations: Author, performing musician, composer, playwright, actor, theater director
- Instruments: Vocals, guitar, piano, banjo
- Years active: 1998–present
- Label: Monkey Farm Records
- Website: howardfishman.com

Howard Fishman is an American author, culture writer, singer, guitarist, bandleader, playwright, and composer from Brooklyn, New York. Since 2016, Fishman has been a contributing writer for The New Yorker. His writing has also appeared in The New York Times, Rolling Stone, The Washington Post Magazine, The Boston Globe, Artforum, Vanity Fair, San Francisco Chronicle, MOJO, and No Depression.

Brooklyn Magazine describes his music and discography as "steeped in country, soul, gospel, rock, blues...jazz, Gypsy swing, and American folk." His plays have been presented at the Brooklyn Academy of Music, the Rattlestick Playwrights Theater, and at Henry Street Settlement.

Fishman's first book, To Anyone Who Ever Asks: The Life, Music, and Mystery of Connie Converse, was published by Dutton/Penguin Random House in May, 2023.

== Musical biography ==
In a 2021 reflection, Fishman traced his introduction to Cat Stevens's music to when, as teenagers in the mid-1980s, friends and he watched the Hal Ashby movie Harold and Maude. One of Stevens's songs used in the movie—which "could be called its theme", namely, “If You Want to Sing Out, Sing Out”—led Fishman the "very next day [to] acquire... a cheap guitar" and begin teaching himself how to play. He continued:

Stevens’s songs eventually led me to Bob Dylan; Dylan led me to early-20th-century blues, jazz and country music; and by my early 20s I was living in New Orleans, fronting my first band.

WAMC's Joe Donahue describes Fishman as having begun "his musical career on the streets of New Orleans and the subways of New York before landing his first major engagement at the Oak Room at the Algonquin Hotel in 1999." He has since headlined in major venues both in the United States and abroad, including the Steppenwolf Theatre, the Blue Note, NJPAC, the Pasadena Playhouse, Joe's Pub, the Bottom Line, and Le Petit Journal in Paris. He made his Lincoln Center debut in February 2007, when he was presented as part of this season's American Songbook series. Fishman has also been a guest on various NPR programs, making feature-length appearances on Fresh Air with Terry Gross, "World Cafe" with David Dye, "The Leonard Lopate Show," and "Soundcheck" with John Schaefer, among others.

== Performing projects ==
=== The Howard Fishman Quartet ===
Fishman's first music project was the Howard Fishman Quartet, a band that first appeared on the NYC scene in 1999, who went from performing on Brooklyn subway platforms to a nine-month residency at the Algonquin Oak Room. The original group featured Russell Farhang on violin, Peter Ecklund on cornet, and Jason Sypher on bass. Fishman led the band on guitar, vocals, and (occasionally) banjo, playing genres that ranged from early jazz to pop, blues, parlor songs, and rural numbers. After the release of their first CD, The Howard Fishman Quartet, Jason Sypher was replaced by Jon Flaugher on bass. A second CD, The Howard Fishman Quartet, Vol. 2, featuring additional material from the sessions that produced the first CD, was released in 2005.

The quartet toured Paris in May 2000, and returned to become a fixture on the New York music scene, garnering favorable reviews from The New York Times, The New Yorker, Le Monde, the International Herald Tribune, and The Village Voice. The band was awarded the BackStage Award for "Outstanding Musical Group". Trumpeter Erik Jekabson joined the Howard Fishman Quartet in the summer of 2000 (replacing cornetist Peter Ecklund).

After two of the four original members left and Fishman began writing more original material, the group began to pursue a different musical path. The band had regular residencies at downtown hotspots like Joe's Pub at The Public Theater and hipster venues in Brooklyn like Pete's Candy Store and Galapagos, where they joined the burgeoning Williamsburg music scene. The shows became more experimental, and Fishman's original material took center stage.

The quartet's second album, I Like You A Lot, was included on Andrew Dansby's list of top albums of 2001 in Rolling Stone and landed Fishman national exposure as a featured guest on NPR's Fresh Air with Terry Gross.

=== The Basement Tapes Project ===
Fishman's Basement Tapes Project had its debut at Joe's Pub at The Public Theater in New York City in 2006. Over the course of three evenings, Fishman and members of his band (including Mazz Swift, Mark McClean, Michael Daves, and Ian Riggs) presented most of the more than 80 bootlegged songs (all of them since then officially released), known as Bob Dylan and The Band's Basement Tapes. The project included readings from Greil Marcus's Invisible Republic.

A CD/DVD featuring highlights from these shows, Howard Fishman Performs Bob Dylan & The Band's 'Basement Tapes' Live at Joe's Pub, was released in 2007, and included a cover of "I'm Not There (1956)", which was praised by Marcus. The project has subsequently been programmed at performing arts centers across America, including Lincoln Center (where it was featured as part of the "American Songbook" series), at Steppenwolf Theatre Company in Chicago, at Duke University., Keene State College, Mercyhurst University, and at University of Iowa.

=== The Biting Fish Brass Band ===
Fishman's Biting Fish Brass Band, formed in 2008, features Fishman fronting a New Orleans-style brass band and performing an eclectic repertoire that includes street-beat style, traditional gospel, covers, as well as Fishman's originals.

A former New Orleans resident, Fishman brings his deep affection for Louisiana music to bear, with references to classic R&B stylists Smiley Lewis and Professor Longhair and jazz legends Danny Barker and Jelly Roll Morton, and explores some of the region's rural Cajun repertoire. Regular members of the Biting Fish include Skatalites trombonist Andrae Murchison, trumpet player Etienne Charles, sousaphonist Kenneth Bentley, Jr., and percussionists Jordan Perlson, Moses Patrou, and Jeremy "Bean" Clemons. The group has toured Northern Europe several times, and is a favorite in Finland and Estonia. In 2013, they headlined the August Blues Festival at Haapsalu Castle in Estonia.

=== Trilogy of albums ===
In January 2009, Fishman entered the recording studio to record three CDs of all-new material—each with a different theme and group of musicians. All three CDs were released in 2010 and "showcased his versatility."

The first CD, Better Get Right, features the Biting Fish Brass Band on a set of material devoted to Fishman's musical roots in New Orleans. No Further Instructions is a concept album about traveling through Romania and Eastern Europe and features Fishman backed by a string quartet. The World Will Be Different is concerned mainly with a turbulent, passionate love affair.

=== Howard Fishman Quartet Vol. III ===
In 2011, Fishman released a third installment of his series of quartet recordings, reuniting with his original violinist Russell Farhang, original cornet player Peter Ecklund, and bassist Andrew Hall for an album of songs with the subtitle Moon Country, featuring the music of Hoagy Carmichael.

== Theater projects ==
=== We are destroyed ===
We are destroyed is an original theater work that incorporates original music, songs, text, and dialogue to explore an archetypal chapter in the American Story, the Donner Party tragedy. It has been described by Fishman as "a tone poem, a jazz opera, a musical inquiry."

Excerpts from We are destroyed were first performed as part of the New Works Now! Festival at The Public Theater. Expanded versions and excerpts have subsequently been presented at Joe's Pub in New York City, the Steppenwolf Theater in Chicago, the Pasadena Playhouse in California, as part of the Lincoln Center Directors Lab West, at The Abrons Arts Center in NYC, and most recently in a workshop reading at New York Theatre Workshop. A number of songs from the score of We are destroyed have been recorded by Fishman on his various albums, including "In Another Life," "Do What I Want," and "A New Life" on Do What I Want.

=== A Star Has Burnt My Eye ===
Fishman's play A Star Has Burnt My Eye, featuring the songs of Connie Converse, was given workshop showings at Joe's Pub, Henry Street Settlement, Rattlestick Playwrights Theater, at the Vox Festival at Dartmouth College, and at The Brick Theater in Brooklyn, in a workshop production that featured Fishman, along with the performers Jean Rohe, Charlotte Mundy, and Liam Robinson. The play sold out its world premiere run at Brooklyn Academy of Music in November 2016, in a production staged by Paul Lazar and featuring performers Fishman, Mundy, Rohe, and Nicholas Webber, and went on to tour in a revised version featuring Fishman, Mundy, Osei Essed (of The Woes), and Dina Maccabee (of Real Vocal String Quartet), in a production performed at Skidmore College, Castelton University, and Vermont Arts Exchange.

== As producer ==
=== Connie's Piano Songs ===
In 2014, Fishman produced an album entitled Connie's Piano Songs, consisting of recordings of the "Art Songs" of Connie Converse, sung by soprano Charlotte Mundy with accompaniment by pianist Christopher Goddard, for the Monkey Farm Records label.

== Discography ==
- The Howard Fishman Quartet (1999)
- I Like You A Lot (2001)
- Do What I Want (2002)
- Look at All This! (2005)
- The Howard Fishman Quartet Vol. II (1999/2005)
- Performs Bob Dylan & The Band's "Basement Tapes" Live at Joe's Pub (2007)
- Better Get Right (2010)
- No Further Instructions (2010)
- The World Will Be Different (2010)
- The Howard Fishman Quartet Vol. III: Moon Country (2011)
- Connie's Piano Songs (2014) (Producer only)
- Uncollected Stories (2015)
