= Pavo Pavo =

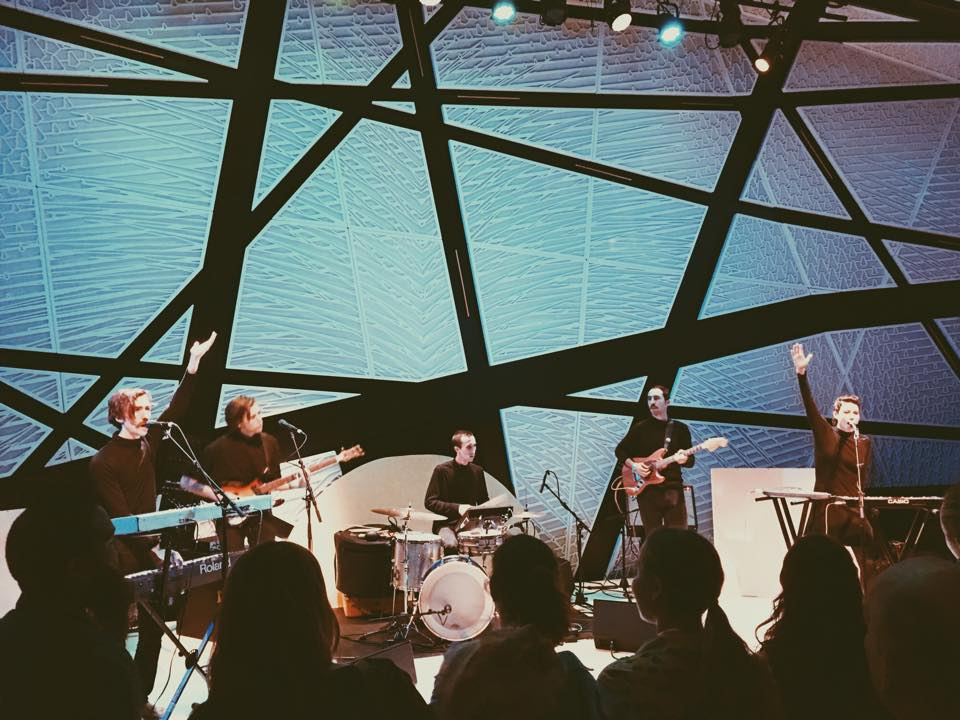
- Pavo Pavo live at National Sawdust in 2016

Background information
- Origin: Brooklyn, New York, United States
- Genres: Indie pop, art rock
- Years active: 2015–2019
- Labels: Bella Union
- Members: Oliver Hill; Eliza Bagg; Ian Romer; Noah Hecht
- Past members: Nolan Green; Austin Vaughn; Peter Coccoma
- Website: www.pavopavomusic.com

Pavo Pavo was an American indie pop quintet from Brooklyn, New York, United States, formed in 2015 and consisting of Eliza Bagg (vocals, violin, synthesizers), Oliver Hill (vocals, guitar, synthesizers), Ian Romer (vocals, bass), Peter Coccoma (guitar), and Noah Hecht (drums). The band is currently signed to Bella Union.

== History ==
Bagg and Hill met in a string quartet at Yale University. Upon graduation they moved to Brooklyn and met Romer, Coccoma, and Hecht shortly thereafter. The band released their first full-length album, Young Narrator in the Breakers, on November 11, 2016 to critical acclaim. The album was produced by Dan Molad (Lucius, Via Audio) and Sam Cohen Their second and final album, Mystery Hour, was released on January 25, 2019.

== Critical reception ==
Young Narrator in the Breakers was met with generally positive reviews. Pitchfork gave it a 7.2, comparing Bagg to "a lovelorn alien reaching out from the farthest reaches of the galaxy," while AllMusic selected it as an Album Pick and wrote, "Pavo Pavo have achieved a collection that eschews the obvious, being undoubtedly hip yet simultaneous geeky in its references, and the resulting work is a real gem."

In August 2016, The Guardian featured Pavo Pavo in the "Band of the Week" column, describing in their music "an eerie washed-out playfulness, a wistful exuberance, that captures the sadness of a passing moment or era."

Economist and The New York Times columnist Paul Krugman, is a noted fan of the band and has featured their music in his blog.

== Discography ==
=== Studio albums ===
- Young Narrator in the Breakers (2016)
- Mystery Hour (2019)
