= Beneath the Lilypad =

Studio album by Alexandra Savior
- Released: May 16, 2025
- Genre: Chamber pop; art pop
- Length: 33:34
- Label: RCA
- Producer: Drew Erickson

Alexandra Savior chronology
| The Archer (2020) | Beneath the Lilypad (2025) |

Singles from Beneath the Lilypad
- 1. "Unforgivable" Released: March 13, 2025; 2. "The Mothership" Released: April 10, 2025

Beneath the Lilypad is the third studio album by American singer-songwriter Alexandra Savior, released by RCA Records on May 16, 2025. The album was produced by Drew Erickson, who also co-wrote four tracks.

== Promotion ==
Savior released the first single, "Unforgivable", on March 13, 2025. She released the second single, "The Mothership", on April 10, 2025.

== Track listing ==
All tracks are written by Alexandra McDermott, except where noted.

Beneath the Lilypad track listing
| No. | Title | Writer(s) | Length |
|---|---|---|---|
| 1. | "Unforgivable" | McDermott; Drew Erickson | 3:43 |
| 2. | "The Mothership" | | 3:10 |
| 3. | "Goodbye, Old Friend" | McDermott; Erickson | 3:44 |
| 4. | "All of the Girls" | McDermott; Erickson | 3:06 |
| 5. | "Hark!" | | 1:54 |
| 6. | "Venus" | McDermott; Erickson | 2:54 |
| 7. | "Let Me Out" | | 2:31 |
| 8. | "Old Oregon" | | 3:12 |
| 9. | "Beneath the Lilypad" | | 1:20 |
| 10. | "The Harvest Is Thoughtless" | | 3:08 |
| 11. | "You Make It Easier" | | 4:52 |
| Total length: | | | 33:34 |

== Personnel ==
Musicians

- Alexandra McDermott – vocals, acoustic guitar, electric guitar, chimes, backing vocals
- Drew Erickson – acoustic guitar, electric guitar, bass, celesta, keyboards, piano, organ
- Josh Adams – drums
- Wayne Bergeron – trumpet
- Andrew Bulbrook – violin
- Zach Dawes – bass
- Zach Dellinger – viola
- Connor Gallaher – pedal steel guitar, slide guitar
- Wynton Grant – violin
- Steven Holtman – trombone
- Logan Hone – alto saxophone
- Loren Humphrey – drums, shaker
- Christine Kim – cello
- Benji Lysaght – acoustic guitar, electric guitar
- Danielle Ondarza – French horn
- Olivia Shapiro – backing vocals

Technical

- Drew Erickson – production
- Adam Ayan – mastering
- Dean Reid – engineer
- Michael Harris – engineer, additional production
- Jackson Dale – assistant engineer
- Franky Fox – assistant engineer
- Nate Haessly – assistant engineer
- Kyle Henderson – assistant engineer
- Travis Pavur – assistant engineer
- Andy Peter – assistant engineer
- Aidan Thillman – assistant engineer

Design

- Alexandra McDermott – art direction
