= Songs from the Vanished Frontier =

Studio album by Yellowbirds
- Released: May 28, 2013
- Genre: Rock, alt rock, neo-psychadelia
- Length: 34:28
- Label: Royal Potato Family Records

Yellowbirds chronology
| The Color (2011) | Songs from the Vanished Frontier (2013) |

Professional ratings
Review scores
| Source | Rating |
|---|---|
| Allmusic | 4/5 stars |
| Rolling Stone | (positive) |

Songs from the Vanished Frontier is the second studio album by Yellowbirds, the project of Brooklyn-based musician Sam Cohen. Released on by May 5, 2013, it was well received by critics, with Allmusic giving it 4/5 stars. Eric Danton of Rolling Stone gave it a positive review, writing that "the new songs have a hazy summertime feel on arrangements that surround Cohen's reverb-soaked vocals with jangling guitars, propulsive basslines and lush string charts."

== Track listing ==
All tracks are written by Sam Cohen.

| No. | Title | Length |
|---|---|---|
| 1. | "Stop Tonight" | 4:08 |
| 2. | "Mean Maybe" | 3:01 |
| 3. | "Love Stories" | 2:43 |
| 4. | "Young Men of Promise" | 2:29 |
| 5. | "The Ceiling" | 5:03 |
| 6. | "The Vanished Frontier" | 3:54 |
| 7. | "Julian" | 3:05 |
| 8. | "For Girls Who Love to Sing" | 4:21 |
| 9. | "What's Out There" | 5:48 |
| Total length: | | 34:28 |

== Personnel ==
- Yellowbirds - band
