= M.T.M.E. =

Single by Alexandra Savior

from the album Belladonna of Sadness
- Released: September 8, 2016
- Length: 3:53
- Label: Columbia
- Songwriter(s): Alexandra Savior; Alex Turner
- Producer(s): James Ford; Alex Turner

Alexandra Savior singles chronology
"Shades" (2016)	"M.T.M.E." (2016)	"Mystery Girl" (2016)

"M.T.M.E." is the second single by American singer-songwriter Alexandra Savior. The initials of the title stand for "music to my ears". It was released on September 8, 2016, via Columbia Records as the second single from Belladonna of Sadness.

An acoustic version of the song was recorded by Savior and others additional as part of the Reeperbahn Festival. A music video for the track was made. Stereogum described it as "a trippy, fast-paced blend of polychrome, hallucinatory, eerie imagery that perfectly matches the ghostly quality of the song."

== Reception ==
British music paper NME has described the sound of "M.T.M.E." as "slinking" and after mentioning her more famous collaborators said: "... the striking and smoky vocals belong solely to Savior and ooze a burgeoning star power well beyond her tender age of 21. The year's most seductive track? Don’t bet against it." Stereogum called the song "a shadowy, rhymthic assault, with infectious bass strums and bright organ bolstering Savior's sultry, cutting vocals."

== Personnel ==
- Alexandra Savior – vocals, sound effects
- Alex Turner – guitars, bass, keyboards, synthesizers
- James Ford – keyboards, synthesizers, drums, percussion
