= The Archer (album) =

Studio album by Alexandra Savior
- Released: January 10, 2020
- Genre: Psychedelic pop; dream pop; americana
- Length: 30:25
- Label: 30th Century
- Producer: Sam Cohen

Alexandra Savior chronology
Belladonna of Sadness (2017)	The Archer (2020)	Beneath the Lilypad (2025)

Singles from The Archer
- 1. "Crying All the Time" Released: June 13, 2019; 2. "Saving Grace" Released: September 13, 2019; 3. "Howl" Released: November 22, 2019

The Archer is the second studio album by American musician Alexandra Savior. It was released on January 10, 2020 through 30th Century Records.

== Background and recording ==
After releasing her debut studio album, Belladonna of Sadness, demos of The Archer would be rejected by Columbia Records. The album was, in fact, finished in December 2018 but she would soon be dropped by both Columbia and her manager, believing she would never be able to play music again. She moved back to her hometown of Portland and resumed her education, but her friend Danger Mouse offered her a deal and signed her to 30th Century Records.

The album was produced by Sam Cohen, a Texas-based producer, and recorded at Dumbo, Brooklyn. Unlike her debut album, she wrote all the lyrics and guitar parts for the album. Her collaboration with Alex Turner caused many misconceptions about her musical direction on the public eye, but with her second album, she took full control.

The track that gave its name to the album, The Archer, was written as a gift for her then-boyfriend, and the music video was directed by herself and artist Alexandria Saleem in 2017.

== Promotion ==
Her lead single, "Crying All The Time" was released on June 13, 2019. The music video was directed by Joseph Bird.

Three more singles, "Saving Grace", "The Archer" and "Howl", were released before the album.

== Critical reception ==
Professional ratings
Aggregate scores
Source	Rating
Metacritic	84/100
Review scores
Source	Rating
Loud and Quiet	6/10 stars
NME	4/5 stars
Sputnikmusic	3.5/5 stars

The Archer was met with universal acclaim reviews from critics. At Metacritic, which assigns a weighted average rating out of 100 to reviews from mainstream publications, this release received an average score of 84, based on 4 reviews.

== Track listing ==
All tracks written by Alexandra McDermott and produced by Sam Cohen.

The Archer track listing
No.	Title	Length
1.	"Soft Currents"	3:11
2.	"Saving Grace"	3:25
3.	"Crying All the Time"	3:30
4.	"Howl"	3:08
5.	"Send Her Back"	2:34
6.	"Can't Help Myself"	2:42
7.	"The Phantom"	2:51
8.	"Bad Disease"	3:46
9.	"But You"	2:53
10.	"The Archer"	2:25
Total length:		30:25
