= Mystery Hour =

Studio album by Pavo Pavo
- Released: January 25, 2019
- Length: 34:15
- Label: Bella Union

Pavo Pavo chronology
Young Narrator in the Breakers (2016)	Mystery Hour (2019)

Professional ratings
Aggregate scores
Source	Rating
Metacritic	75/100
Review scores
Source	Rating
AllMusic	4/5 stars
Pitchfork	7.2/10
PopMatters	7/10
Under the Radar	7/10

Mystery Hour is the second studio album by American indie pop band Pavo Pavo. It was released on January 25, 2019 through Bella Union.

== Track listing ==
No.	Title	Length
1.	"Mystery Hour"	3:38
2.	"Mon Cheri"	2:55
3.	"Easy"	2:13
4.	"100 Years"	3:09
5.	"Check the Weather"	3:29
6.	"Close to Your Ego"	2:33
7.	"The Other Half"	3:39
8.	"Around, Pt. 1"	3:32
9.	"Around, Pt. 2"	2:14
10.	"Statue Is a Man Inside"	3:19
11.	"Goldenrod"	3:47
