= Belladonna of Sadness (album) =

2017 studio album by Alexandra Savior

Studio album by Alexandra Savior
- Released: April 7, 2017
- Recorded: 2014–2015
- Studio: Vox (Los Angeles)
- Genres: Psychedelic pop; desert rock
- Length: 40:56
- Label: Columbia
- Producers: James Ford; Alex Turner

Alexandra Savior chronology
Belladonna of Sadness (2017)	The Archer (2020)

Singles from Belladonna of Sadness
- 1. "Shades" Released: June 17, 2016; 2. "M.T.M.E." Released: September 8, 2016; 3. "Mystery Girl" Released: November 18, 2016; 4. "Mirage" Released: February 3, 2017; 5. "Vanishing Point" Released: March 10, 2017

Belladonna of Sadness is the debut studio album by American singer Alexandra Savior, released on April 7, 2017, by Columbia Records. It was written by Savior and English musician Alex Turner in 2014, mainly on acoustic guitar, at his Los Angeles home. It was produced in Hollywood by James Ford and Turner, alongside bass player Zach Dawes. Savior painted the album artwork herself, which depicts an Atropa belladonna with a flower resembling a red button. Its title refers to the 1973 Japanese anime of the same name.

Belladonna of Sadness was released to generally favorable reviews from critics and was named one of the 30 best albums of the year by The Independent. The album was promoted by the singles "Shades", "M.T.M.E.", "Mystery Girl", "Mirage", and "Vanishing Point".

== Background and recording ==
In mid-2013, Savior moved to Los Angeles to pursue a music career. Around September of that year, she signed a recording contract with Columbia Records, which she chose as the other labels were interested in modeling her after established pop artists such as Katy Perry or Pink. Savior was in the process of writing her album with different songwriters, but felt those sessions were leading her nowhere. She met English musician Miles Kane at a party, where they jokingly talked about collaborating. Shortly afterward, she suggested working with either Kane, or his friend Alex Turner to her label.

Columbia contacted Turner and arranged a meeting. A week later Savior and Turner met at a coffee shop, and found out they had a lot in common musically. Savior said "We went back to his house and listened to records. I played him some acoustic songs that I had been writing and worked on them and wrote a song that day." Savior found the experience to be hard at first, but having written with other musicians in the past helped. She said the process was "pretty collaborative", and described Turner as being "much more organised", compared to her more "fluid" approach. Savior would first work on melodies and lyrics by herself, and later bring them to Turner's house where they would build on those ideas together. Bass player Zach Dawes would often come by Turner's house during their sessions, and ended up writing the bass line for "Girlie". Once the songs were written they would record demos onto an 8-track Tascam. The writing process took over a year and half, due to Turner's other commitments; Savior said, "I didn't want to wait around so I kind of tried to work with other people but as the musical relationship developed and the songs stated to come with more of a consistent theme. I had to stop working with other people as I felt like I was cheating on him or something, like cheating on the record.”

In 2015, Savior began recording material at Vox Studios in Los Angeles. Turner's frequent collaborator James Ford co-produced the album at his request. The studio setup for the album mostly consisted of Savior, Turner and Ford, with the three occasionally joined by bassist Zach Dawes. Ford played drums and keys, with Turner on guitar and sometimes bass, as Savior described her playing as "elementary level." Because of her inexperience, Savior felt nervous at first but as the sessions went on she said “I was puppeteering James more than he preferred, I'm sure.” The record was done by June 2015. The recording process for Belladonna of Sadness was captured by film director Ben Chappell in the video "Alexandra Savior – An Introduction", which featured on Savior's YouTube channel.

== Critical reception ==
Professional ratings
Aggregate scores
Source	Rating
Metacritic	66/100
Review scores
Source	Rating
AllMusic	4/5 stars
DIY	4/5 stars
The Guardian	3/5 stars
Paste	8.8/10
Pitchfork	6.0/10

Belladonna of Sadness was released to mostly positive reviews. Paste praised Savior's singing, comparing her style to Françoise Hardy and Lana Del Rey. Writing for AllMusic, Rob Wacey praised Savior's vocals and deemed it an "impressive debut," noting that the album's "echoing psychedelic strings and guitars gradually mesh together into a wonderful cacophony of noise, building toward a magnificently executed crescendo for the album’s curtain call."

There were mixed reviews from The Guardian, writing that the album made Savior sound more "like an imitation, than the real thing," and from Pitchfork critic Hilary Hughes, who wrote: "Instead of a debut album that flaunts the dynamism of a new artist, the result is an album that barely even feels like one—or, at the very least, only vaguely resembles a collaborative effort that casts Savior as the hostess of Turner's discount ideas."

=== Retrospective commentary ===
In 2018, Alex Turner claimed that the use of a TASCAM 388 8-track, to record Savior's album demos, helped him put together his own demos for Arctic Monkeys's sixth studio album Tranquility Base Hotel & Casino (2018). In 2023, producer James Ford claimed Belladonna of Sadness was the most underrated record he had been a part of, adding, "I remember really enjoying making that and thinking it sounded great, [...] There's lots of ones that you think are gonna do great but don't."

=== Accolades ===
Publication	Accolade	Year	Rank	Ref.
The Independent	The 30 Best Albums of 2017	2017	30	

== Track listing ==
All tracks are written by Alexandra Savior and Alex Turner, except where noted.

Side A
No.	Title	Writer(s)	Length
1.	"Mirage"		3:25
2.	"Bones"	Turner	2:49
3.	"Shades"		3:50
4.	"Girlie"		3:24
5.	"Frankie"		3:48
6.	"M.T.M.E."		3:23

Side B
No.	Title	Writer(s)	Length
7.	"Audeline"	Savior; Turner; James Ford	3:51
8.	"Cupid"		2:58
9.	"'Til You're Mine"		3:32
10.	"Vanishing Point"		4:20
11.	"Mystery Girl"		5:35
Total length:			40:56

== Personnel ==
Credits are adapted from the Belladonna of Sadness liner notes.

Musicians

- Alexandra Savior – vocals
- James Ford – drums, percussion, keyboards, synthesisers, vibraphone (tracks 3, 4 and 7–10), guitars (tracks 2 and 7), bass (track 10)
- Alex Turner – bass (except tracks 4 and 10), guitars, keyboards, synthesisers
- Zach Dawes – bass (track 4), vibraphone (track 4), organ (track 5)

Production

- James Ford – production, mixing
- Alex Turner – production
- Michael Harris – engineering
- Bob Ludwig – mastering

Artwork

- Alexandra Savior – photography, art direction and design
- Samuel Kristofski – photography
- Maria Paula Marulanda – art direction and design

== Charts ==
Chart (2017)	Peak position
New Zealand Heatseeker Albums (RMNZ)	9
