= The Color (album) =

Studio album by Yellowbirds
- Released: February 15, 2011
- Genres: Dream Pop, Psychedelic Pop
- Label: Royal Potato Family

Yellowbirds chronology
| The Color (2011) | Songs from the Vanished Frontier (2013) |

Professional ratings
Review scores
| Source | Rating |
|---|---|
| Ultimate Guitar | (7.7/10) |

The Color is the debut studio album by Yellowbirds. Released on February 15, 2011, by Sam Cohen, when Yellowbirds was still Cohen's solo projects. It was well received by the majority of critics, with Ultimate Guitar giving it 7.7/10.

== Track listing ==
1. "The Rest of My Life"
2. "Rings In the Trees"
3. "Beneath the Reach of Light"
4. "The Color Ii"
5. "The Honest Ocean"
6. "The Color"
7. "Pulaski Bridge"
8. "Our Good Days Are Gone"
9. "In Our World"
10. "Wagner, Max"
11. "The Reason"

== Personnel ==
- Yellowbirds
