= Young Narrator in the Breakers =

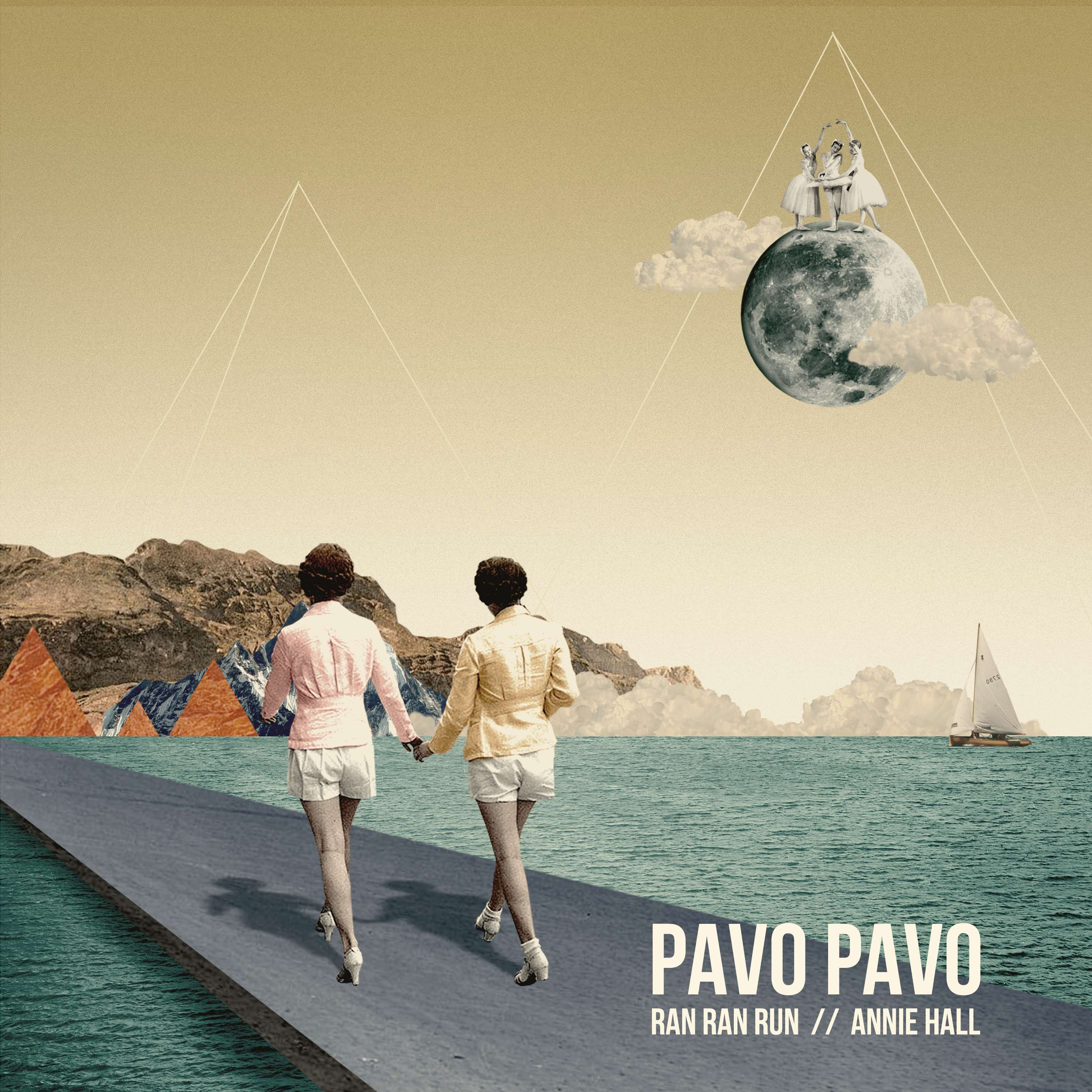

Studio album by Pavo Pavo
- Released: November 11, 2016
- Length: 42:14
- Label: Bella Union
- Producer: Dan Molad; Sam Cohen

Pavo Pavo chronology
Young Narrator in the Breakers (2016)	Mystery Hour (2019)

Young Narrator in the Breakers is the debut studio album by American indie pop band Pavo Pavo. The album was recorded in and around Brooklyn and released on November 11, 2016, on Bella Union.

== Critical reception ==
Professional ratings
Aggregate scores
Source	Rating
Metacritic	71/100
Review scores
Source	Rating
AllMusic	3.5/5 stars
Financial Times	4/5 stars
The Independent	3/5 stars
The Line of Best Fit	8/10
Mojo	3/5 stars
Pitchfork	7.2/10
Record Collector	4/5 stars
Uncut	7/10

Young Narrator in the Breakers received largely positive reviews from contemporary music critics. At Metacritic, which assigns a normalized rating out of 100 to reviews from mainstream critics, the album received an average score of 71, which indicates "generally favorable reviews".

Cameron Cook of Pitchfork praised the record, comparing vocalist Eliza Bagg to "a lovelorn alien reaching out from the farthest reaches of the galaxy," while AllMusic selected it as an Album Pick and wrote, "Pavo Pavo have achieved a collection that eschews the obvious, being undoubtedly hip yet simultaneous geeky in its references, and the resulting work is a real gem."

Economist and New York Times columnist Paul Krugman is a noted fan of the band and has featured their music in his blog.

== Track listing ==
All tracks are written by Pavo Pavo

Young Narrator in the Breakers track listing
No.	Title	Length
1.	"Ran Ran Run"	3:56
2.	"Annie Hall"	3:10
3.	"Ruby (Let's Buy the Bike)"	3:40
4.	"Wiserway"	3:44
5.	"A Quiet Time with Spaceman Sputz"	3:05
6.	"Somewhere in Iowa"	3:48
7.	"Belle of the Ball"	3:07
8.	"The Aquarium"	3:49
9.	"No Mind"	3:51
10.	"John (A Little Time)"	3:11
11.	"Young Narrator in the Breakers"	1:00
12.	"2020, We'll Have Nothing Going On"	5:59
Total length:		42:14

== Personnel ==
Pavo Pavo

- Oliver Hill
- Eliza Bagg
- Nolan Green
- Ian Romer
- Austin Vaughn

Additional personnel

- Dan Molad – producer, mix engineer
- Sam Cohen – producer
- TW Walsh – mastering engineer
