= Vermont Arts Exchange =

American non-profit community arts organization

The Vermont Arts Exchange (VAE) is a non-profit community arts organization based at North Bennington in the US state of Vermont. The mission of the VAE is to strengthen communities and neighborhoods through the arts.

== History ==
=== Foundation ===
Co-founded by Matthew Perry and Patricia Pedreira in 1994, VAE has been committed to high quality arts and culture reaching people of all ages, abilities and incomes. Located in the Sage Street Mill, a historic brick factory in the village of North Bennington, VAE offers classes, workshops, vacation camps for children, free open studio time for teens, exhibitions with national and international visual artists and performances by acclaimed performing artists and musicians. Community and outreach art programs include papermaking, print making, drawing, painting, dance, drumming, sculpture, ceramics, rughooking, environmental projects, literary readings, drama and music.

The VAE's Outreach and Arts Education Programs have been sustained through ongoing working relationships and partnerships with local municipalities, hospitals, housing groups, law enforcement, schools and civic organizations. Arts education programs developed for youth and their families have been recognized at the local, state and regional levels.

=== Basement Music Series ===
Syd Straw and Plankton perform at VAE

In the winter of 2004, VAE started the Basement Music Series ((BMS)) in an effort to battle the cold weather blues. The remedy was transforming the large downstairs studio into a 135-seat, cabaret-style club with candles, tablecloths and a cash bar. The New York Times has called the Basement Music Series "...a Park Slope bistro in the Green Mountains."

"The funky basement vibe, the smart, hip audience and most of all the real palpable sense of community all contribute to making VAE an ideal venue," says singer/songwriter, Howard Fishman (of the Howard Fishman Quartet), who will return for his third annual BMS concert March 16 and 17, 2007. (Last March, Fishman and his quartet played two sold-out, back-to-back shows; 2005's concert single show similarly sold out.)

Nearly always drawing a full-house, BMS performances have included New York City's Luminescent Orchestrii with "music to make you dance, kiss, and scream," honey-throated indie rocker Syd Straw, NYC's jazz chanteuse Morely, Brazztree's traditional Eastern and Western folk-influenced compositions, gypsy jazz with Ameranouche, Cuban composer and pianist Omar Sosa with hot Afro-Cuban rhythms and joyful jazz, the unique “global jazz” sound of The Paul Austerlitz Group, bluesman Corey Harris, and internationally acclaimed jazz singer Tessa Souter, among many others.

=== Annual North Bennington Halloween Parade ===
Undoubtedly one of VAE's most popular events is its annual North Bennington Halloween Parade. The VAE celebrated the 25th anniversary of its Halloween Parade in 2017. The 2005 and 2006 parades each drew upwards of 500 people.

Festivities include a lively promenade through town as children, artists, musicians, bellydancers, drummers, friends and neighbors dress up and join the fun, accompanied by music, dancing and giant sculptural costumes. After the parade, participants gather at VAE's Sage Street Mill for drumming, dancing, storytelling, cider and doughnuts, a blazing bonfire and a costume contest.

=== Healing Arts initiative ===
With a $100,000 grant from Jane's Trust, Vermont Arts Exchange was able to create—with a consortium of New England arts and healthcare organizations—an innovative new arts and healing initiative, The Healing Arts: New Pathways to Health. The initiative utilizes the arts to improve the quality of life for institutionalized adults and elders living with chronic illnesses.

Through the project, arts and healing programs in music, visual arts, theater and dance will be integrated into the existing network of programs and services offered at the Vermont Veterans Home and other healthcare sites in New England.

The grant award from Jane's Trust builds on a multi-year partnership between VAE and the Vermont Veterans Home, allowing the healthcare facility and the Arts Exchange to expand arts and healing initiatives to include all staff and residents at the Veterans Home through new hands-on staff trainings, a Caring For Caregivers program, an on-site visual arts studio and guest artist residencies.

The partnership had its start with the dementia program and created a significant impact on the residents’ quality of life—reaching residents with advanced dementia who can otherwise be difficult to connect with.

“The expressive arts are extremely effective in reaching people with dementia and bringing joy and meaning into their lives,” said Christina Cosgrove, director of Alzheimer Dementia Programs at the Vermont Veteran's Home, in a press release from VAE. “We’ve seen residents come alive, reconnect to their passion, to what they really love; it’s an awakening that carries over into their whole quality of life.”

One such program brought guest artist Michael Wingfield of Portland, Maine—a drummer, performer and teacher with more than 20 years of experience in the African-Caribbean percussion arts and culture—and his “The Rhythm of Life” to residents and staff at Tewksbury Hospital in March 2005. Tewksbury is a comprehensive care center for adults with chronic medical and mental illnesses in Tewksbury, Massachusetts. Wingfield's program introduced learning specific rhythms and songs of the African New World, as well as historical context and modern-day application, to geriatric patients, patients with mental illnesses and those suffering from Huntington's Disease.

VAE Artistic Director Matthew Perry said, “To these people, often underserved in the arts community, become so happy, so expressive, makes me feel great. Art helps these people become engaged in the world and interact with each other. The energy in the room coupled with the quality of work and its presentation, the expressions on the participant’s faces, all of those elements have made working with the Vermont Veterans Home an exemplary partnership.”

The Healing Arts: New Pathways to Health is supported by a multi-disciplinary team of New England–based professionals and leaders in the fields of arts, public health, technology and education—including the Vermont Veteran's Home, Tewksbury Hospital, United Counseling Services, the Massachusetts Cultural Council and Vermont Arts Exchange. The project is also supported by interns from accredited colleges and universities, including Lesley University, the MIT Media Lab, Bennington College and the Berklee School of Music.
