= Apollo Sunshine (album) =

Studio album by Apollo Sunshine
- Released: September 13, 2005
- Genre: Indie rock
- Length: 38:09
- Label: spinART
- Producer: Brian McTear

Apollo Sunshine chronology
Katonah (2003)	Apollo Sunshine (2005)	Shall Noise Upon (2008)

Professional ratings
Review scores
Source	Rating
Kludge	7/10
Paste Magazine	4/5 stars
Pitchfork	7.8/10
PopMatters	6/10

Apollo Sunshine is the second studio album from the Boston area indie rock group Apollo Sunshine. It was released on spinART Records in September 2005 as a follow-up to the band's debut record Katonah. The album garnered more attention for the band than their debut, and was named to the Amazon.com Best of 2005: Editors' Picks in Rock list at number 5. This ranked them above such veteran acts as The Rolling Stones, the Foo Fighters and Nine Inch Nails, and in the company of more well-known bands such as The White Stripes, Bob Dylan, and Oasis.

== Track listing ==
1. "Flip!" – 4:15
2. "Ghost" – 3:44
3. "A Finger Pointing at the Moon" – 0:33
4. "Phony Marony" – 2:03
5. "Today Is the Day" – 2:19
6. "The Hotter, the Wetter, the Better" – 2:35
7. "Eyes" – 2:01
8. "Phone Sex" – 3:24
9. "Magnolia" – 2:28
10. "Phyllis" – 4:10
11. "God" – 1:51
12. "Lord" – 5:22
13. "Bed" – 3:24
