= Katonah (album) =

Studio album by Apollo Sunshine
- Released: October 7, 2003
- Recorded: May 2002–June 2003
- Genre: Indie rock
- Length: 42:07
- Label: spinART
- Producer: Andy Edelstein

Apollo Sunshine chronology
Katonah (2003)	Apollo Sunshine (2005)

Professional ratings
Review scores
Source	Rating
Allmusic	4/5 stars
Pitchfork Media	(7.2/10)

Katonah is the debut studio album by Boston area indie rock group Apollo Sunshine, released on October 7, 2003, on spinART Records.

== Background ==
Jeremy Black and Sam Cohen met at Berklee College of Music in 1997 while attending a summer performance program, and then met Jesse Gallagher while attending the school full-time. Their musical tastes won the approval of professor Andy Edelstein, who taught classes Black and Cohen were in. Edelstein agreed to travel to Katonah, New York four days a week to produce the band's first album, which was about to be recorded in a large shed on Black's parents' property (featured in "Before and After" photos on the album's cover and sleeve art) which was constructed in May and June 2002.

== Recording ==
Recording commenced in June and wrapped in September, with post-production completing in June 2003 in Arlington, Massachusetts.

== Track listing ==
All tracks are written by Apollo Sunshine, except where noted.

No.	Title	Writer(s)	Length
1.	"Katonah"		1:17
2.	"Fear of Heights"		4:19
3.	"I was on the Moon"		4:15
4.	"Happening"		3:10
5.	"Blood is Wood"		2:47
6.	"The Egg"		3:18
7.	"Sheets With Stars"		4:35
8.	"Mayday Disorder"	Apollo Sunshine, Dina Varsalone	7:17
9.	"Conscious Pilot"		6:51
10.	"Hot Air Balloon"		4:18
