= Shall Noise Upon =

Studio album by Apollo Sunshine
- Released: August 5, 2008 vinyl and digital download
- Genre: Indie rock
- Length: 38:21
- Label: Headless Heroes
- Producer: Quentin Stoltzfus; Layout Design by Cody Hoyt

Apollo Sunshine chronology
Apollo Sunshine (2005)	Shall Noise Upon (2008)

Professional ratings
Review scores
Source	Rating
AllMusic	3.5/5 stars
Pitchfork Media	(8.0/10)

Shall Noise Upon is the third and final studio album by Apollo Sunshine. It was released on vinyl and digital download on August 5, 2008. A CD version followed on September 2.

== History ==
The record, which went under "Mysteries of the Old Soul" as a working title, was recorded during the summer of 2007 in the Catskill Mountains, in a "house inhabited by spirits" and located next door to the home of the original Uncle Sam. Announcement of the finishing of the record was first announced on the band's website, where this message was posted:

The record is done! Much more info on that coming soon.

A more formal announcement was made on May 29 by JamBase.com, which officially announced the album's title Shall Noise Upon and the track listing. The album includes Drug Rug, Edan, Viva Viva, and White Flight as guests.

== Singles and soundtracks ==
- The opening track, "Breeze", is featured near the end of the film Whip It, and appears on the movie soundtrack.
- The song "We Are Born When We Die" features in the episode "End Times" of the TV show Breaking Bad

== Track listing ==
1. "Breeze"
2. "Singing to the Earth (to Thank Her for You)"
3. "666: The Coming of the New World Government"
4. "Shall Noise Upon"
5. "Brotherhood of Death"
6. "Happiness"
7. "We Are Born When We Die"
8. "The Funky Chamberlain (Who Begot Who)"
9. "Wolf Frog White"
10. "Money"
11. "The Mermaid Angeline"
12. "Green Green Lawns of Outer Space"
13. "Honestly"
14. "Coyote Hearing"
15. "Fog and Shadow"
16. "Light of the World"
