= How Sad, How Lovely =

Compilation album by Connie Converse
- Released: March 5, 2009
- Recorded: 1954
- Studios: Gene Deitch's kitchen, New York City, New York, United States
- Genre: American folk music
- Length: 40:32
- Language: English
- Label: Lau Derette
- Producers: Dan Dzula; David Herman

Connie Converse chronology
| How Sad, How Lovely (2009) | Sad Lady (2020) |

How Sad, How Lovely is the first album collecting music from American singer-songwriter Connie Converse, released in 2009. The guitarist and singer had disappeared over 30 years prior and this compilation is made up of some of the few recordings she made in the 1950s; it has received positive critical reception and led to a few other such compilations and tribute albums.

== Recording and release ==
Cartoonist Gene Deitch met Converse in the early 1950s and invited her to record her songs in his kitchen. The recordings were dormant for 50 years, until he published "One by One" in 2004, leading to Dan Dzula tracking him down to restore, produce, and release a collection of Converse's music.

== Reception ==
=== Critical reception ===
Professional ratings
Review scores
| Source | Rating |
|---|---|
| AllMusic | 4.5/5 stars |
| Pitchfork | 9.4/10 |
| PopMatters | 8/10 stars |

Editors of AllMusic scored this release 4.5 out of five stars, with reviewer Fred Thomas noting that "Converse's lyrics are always playful, spacy, and even somewhat psychedelic" and that she "made songs far too vulnerable and odd to be accepted in her time". Writing for the Los Angeles Times, Randall Roberts shortlisted this album among excellent reissues coming out in the following months and calling the work "strikingly intimate, poetic self-penned folk songs". Fellow folk performer Robert Forster characterized the release as "both a historical document and a living, breathing album", noting how Converse may have single-handedly shifted American folk music from political music and work songs toward the confessional emphasis of singer-songwriter music: "doing this, alone and unaided, making a deep and marvellous connection between lyric and song that allows us to enter the world of an extraordinary woman living in mid-twentieth-century New York".

A 2014 overview of Converse's life by BBC News had author Ian Youngs characterizing the musician as a writer of "haunting, beautiful songs with a poetic honesty and melodic sophistication" who "was not the most gifted vocalist or guitar player" but who sang "with a depth, intimacy and eloquence that were rare for that era". John Paul of PopMatters rated the 2015 re-release an eight out of 10, calling her biography secondary to the musical legacy she left, noting that "a closer listen to the melodic constructs of each and, most importantly, the lyrical content, the siren-like allure of Connie Converse becomes impossible to resist". In 2020, Greta Kline of Frankie Cosmos named this one of her favorite albums.

=== Popular reception ===
The popular reception to Converse's music has been unexpectedly positive, starting with a cult following shortly after its release, to tribute albums and a documentary in the next few years, and with her songs becoming hits on streaming music service Spotify by the mid-2010s.

== Track listing ==
All songs written by Connie Converse

1. "Talkin’ Like You (Two Tall Mountains)" – 2:30
2. "Johnny’s Brother" – 2:47
3. "Roving Woman" – 2:41
4. "Down This Road" – 1:44
5. "The Clover Saloon" – 2:12
6. "John Brady" – 1:46
7. "We Lived Alone" – 1:15
8. "Playboy of the Western World" – 4:01
9. "Unknown (A Little Louder, Love)" – 0:34
10. "One by One" – 2:05
11. "Father Neptune" – 2:06
12. "Man in the Sky" – 4:04
13. "Empty Pocket Waltz" – 1:59
14. "Honeybee" – 1:34
15. "There Is a Vine" – 1:35
16. "How Sad, How Lovely" – 2:38
17. "Trouble" – 1:19
18. "I Have Considered the Lillies" – 3:42

In 2015, Captured Tracks re-released the album on vinyl, adding the final track.

== Personnel ==
- Connie Converse – guitar on all tracks, vocals on all tracks, tape operator/recording engineer on "Johnny's Brother", "Roving Woman", "The Clover Saloon", "John Brady", "One by One", "Man in the Sky", "Empty Pocket Waltz", "Honeybee", and "How Sad, How Lovely"
- Gene Deitch – recording engineer/tape operator on "Talkin' Like You (Two Tall Mountains)", "Down This Road", "We Lived Alone", "Playboy of the Western World", "Unknown (A Little Louder, Love)", "Father Neptune", "There Is a Vine", and "Trouble"
- Dan Dzula – production, restoration
- David Herman – production, restoration
- Mike Schultz – artwork
- Sarah Wilmer – artwork

== Charts ==
Chart performance for How Sad, How Lovely
| Chart (2024–2026) | Peak position |
|---|---|
| UK Album Downloads (Official Charts) | 41 |
| UK Independent Albums Breakers (OCC) | 14 |
