= Dawn Landes =

American singer-songwriter

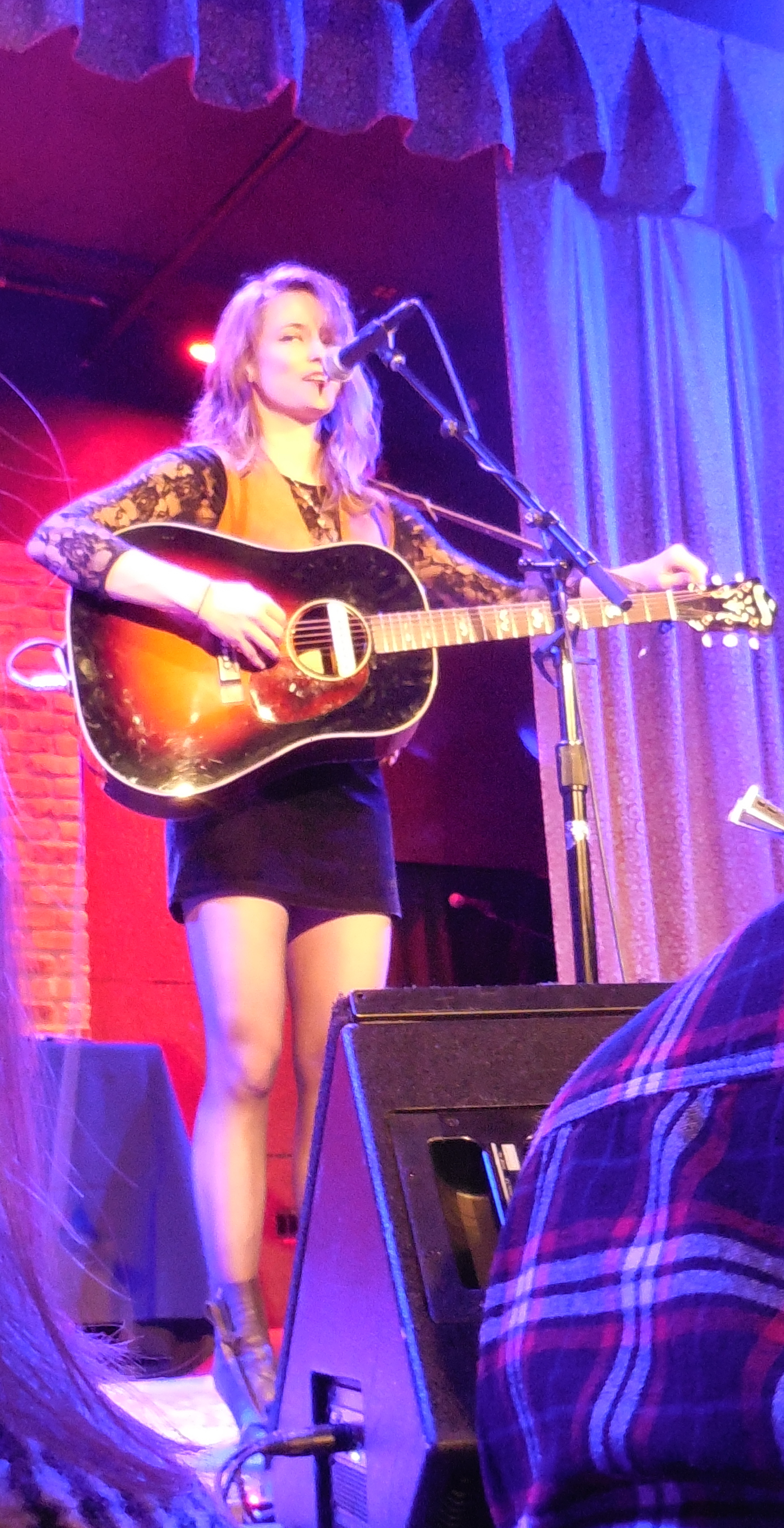
- Landes performing in 2015 at the Chicago City Winery

Background information
- Born: December 5, 1980 (age 45); Louisville, Kentucky, U.S.
- Origin: Brooklyn, New York, U.S.
- Genres: Folk, Rock, Pop, Country
- Occupations: Singer-songwriter; multi-instrumentalist; glockenspiel player; sound engineer; record producer
- Instruments: Guitar, vocals, glockenspiel
- Labels: Western Vinyl; Cooking Vinyl; Fargo; Tummy Touch
- Website: dawnlandes.com

Dawn Landes (born December 5, 1980) is an American singer-songwriter and musician. She is originally from around Louisville, Kentucky but spent many years living and performing in Brooklyn, New York. As a recording artist she has released five full-length albums: dawn's music (2005), Fireproof (2008), Sweetheart Rodeo (2010), Bluebird (2014) and Meet Me At The River (2018) as well as five EPs: Straight Lines (2006), Two Three Four (2006), Mal Habillée (2012), Covers EP (2014) and Desert Songs (2015). In support of her releases, Landes has toured extensively in the US, Europe and around the world, often sharing the stage with artists such as Ray Lamontagne, Feist, Andrew Bird, José González, The Weakerthans, Midlake, Suzanne Vega, and Sufjan Stevens.

She sings and plays glockenspiel as part of New York City American roots music band Hem, and as an instrumentalist, she has been a member of Sufjan Stevens' touring band (2015–2016). A producer and engineer, she worked at Stratosphere Sound in New York City and at Philip Glass' own personal recording studio. In 2007 Landes helped found Saltlands Studio in Brooklyn, NY. She has collaborated with contemporaries like Justin Townes Earle, Will Oldham and Josh Ritter in the studio. Her songs have been featured in popular films and TV shows, including The Good Wife, Bored to Death, Skins, House, Gossip Girl and United States of Tara. She composed original scores for two feature films Blackbird and Familiar Strangers and wrote the end credit song for Savage Grace starring Julianne Moore. Landes has appeared with The American Songbook Series, Boston Pops, TED and in 2012 with the NYC Ballet at the Lincoln Center for the Benjamin Millepied ballet "Two Hearts" singing a ballad entitled "The Brown Girl" as part of composer Nico Muhly's score.

In June 2012, she released Mal Habillée, a collection of original French songs in the style of Ye-Ye. It features guest vocals by Matthew Caws (Nada Surf) and Tunde Adebimpe (TV on the Radio) and an interactive ebook with illustrations by the artist Danica Novgorodoff to accompany the text. In February 2014, she released Bluebird which features guest appearances by Norah Jones and others Bluebird won the 2015 14th Annual Independent Music Awards for '"Folk/Singer-Songwriter Album of the Year".

On October 2, 2020, Landes released her latest album, ROW, featuring the music from the upcoming musical of the same name, written with book-writer Daniel Goldstein, under commission from New York Voices. The album project began with a Ted Talk Landes presented in 2015 on the musical's subject, transatlantic rower, Tori Murden McClure. The album features Will Oldham, Rachel Grimes, and Ben Sollee. The show was originally set to premiere in the summer of 2020 at the Williamstown Theatre Festival but was postponed due to the COVID-19 pandemic. The Williamstown Theatre Festival announced a partnership with Audible to release all seven of the productions originally expected to be performed during the 2020 festival.

In 2024 Landes recorded and toured songs from the 1971 'The Liberated Woman's Songbook' by Jerry Silverman. In London, this included an on stage discussion with Peggy Seeger.

Landes also performs as a member of all-girl trio The Bandana Splits. Landes was once married to musician Josh Ritter, with whom she also toured. She now lives in Chapel Hill, North Carolina and is married to composer Creighton Irons, with whom she has two children, Callan and Wright.

== Discography ==
Albums

- dawn's music (2005)
- Fireproof (2008)
- Sweetheart Rodeo (2010)
- Bluebird (2014)
- Meet Me at the River (2018)
- ROW (2020)
- The Liberated Woman's Songbook (2024)

EPs

- Straight Lines (2005)
- Two Three Four (2006)
- Mal Habillée (2012)
- Covers EP featuring Jim James (My Morning Jacket) (2014)
- Desert Songs EP with Piers Faccini (2016)
- My Tiny Twilight (2019)

== Songs in other media ==
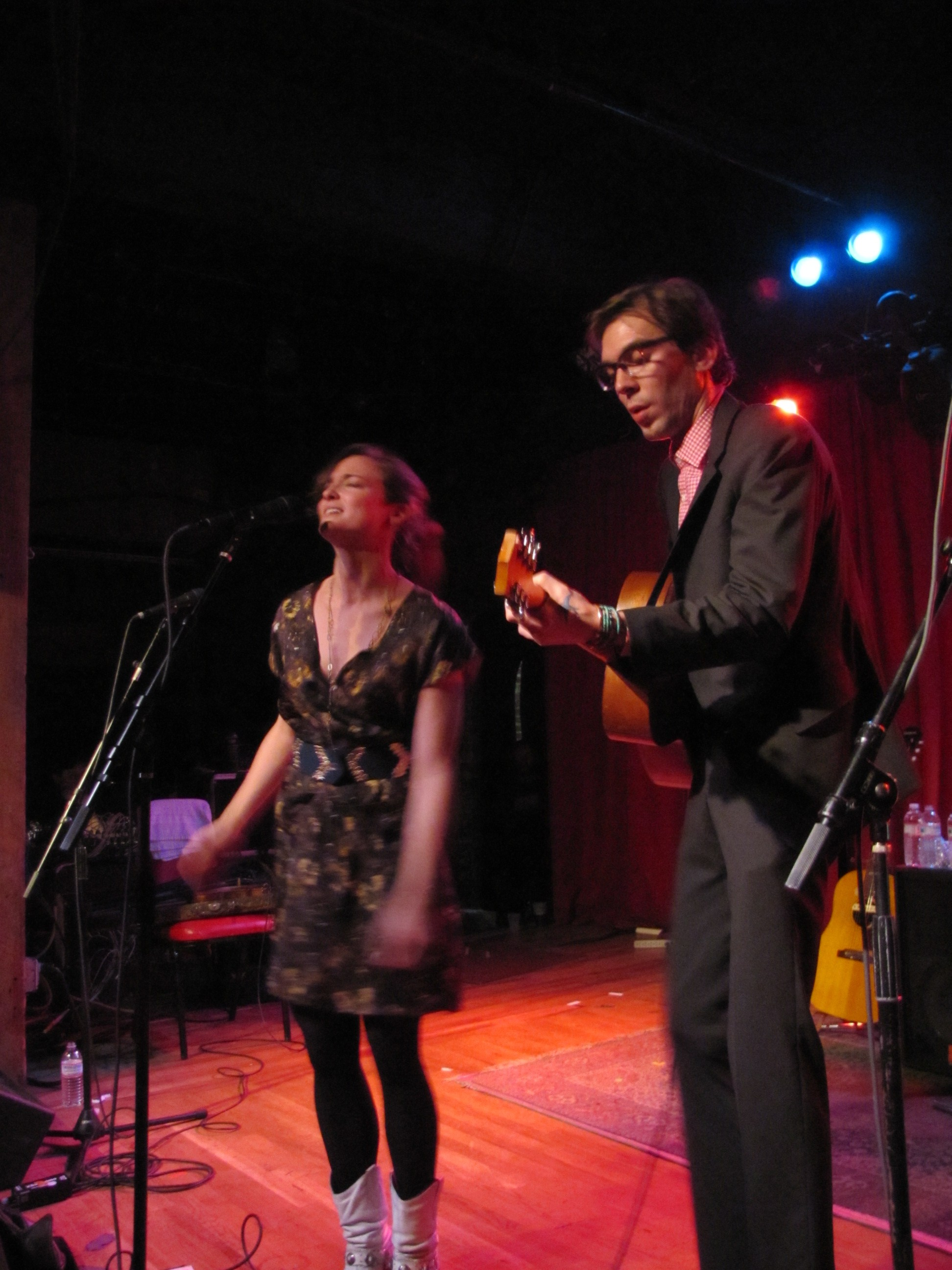
Landes on stage accompanied by Justin Townes Earle in Nashville, Tennessee in 2010

- Two of her songs, "Kissing Song" and "You Alone", are featured in the 2005 film Winter Passing. "Kissing Song" was played during the ending credit.
- She also contributed a song (Lullaby for Tony) for the closing credits of the 2007 film Savage Grace.
- The song "Straight Lines" was used in an episode of the Showtime series United States of Tara. It was also used in a commercial for the Chrysler Town and Country.
- "Straight Lines" was also used in a television advertisement for Transport for London in the UK.
- "Straight Lines" was also used at the end of the documental "When Harry Left Hogwarts" released as special feature in the Blu-ray version of Harry Potter and the Deathly Hallows – Part 2.
- The song "Drive" was used in the "Under My Skin" episode of the fifth season of the Fox series House M.D.
- The hidden track "Won't Back Down", a cover of Tom Petty, was used for a Human Rights Campaign video supporting the repeal of Proposition 8.
- The track "Toy Piano" from the album Fireproof was used in an episode of Californication and Bored to Death.
- The track "Twilight" from the album Fireproof was used as incidental music in an episode of Holby City.
- The track "Mud and Stars" was used in the fifth episode of the Australian mini-series Underbelly: A Tale of Two Cities.
- "All Dressed in White" was used in the series four premiere of Skins.
- Landes has scored two feature films, Blackbird (2007) and Familiar Strangers (2008).
- The song "Home" was featured on the CBS series The Good Wife.
