= Apollo Sunshine =

American alternative rock band

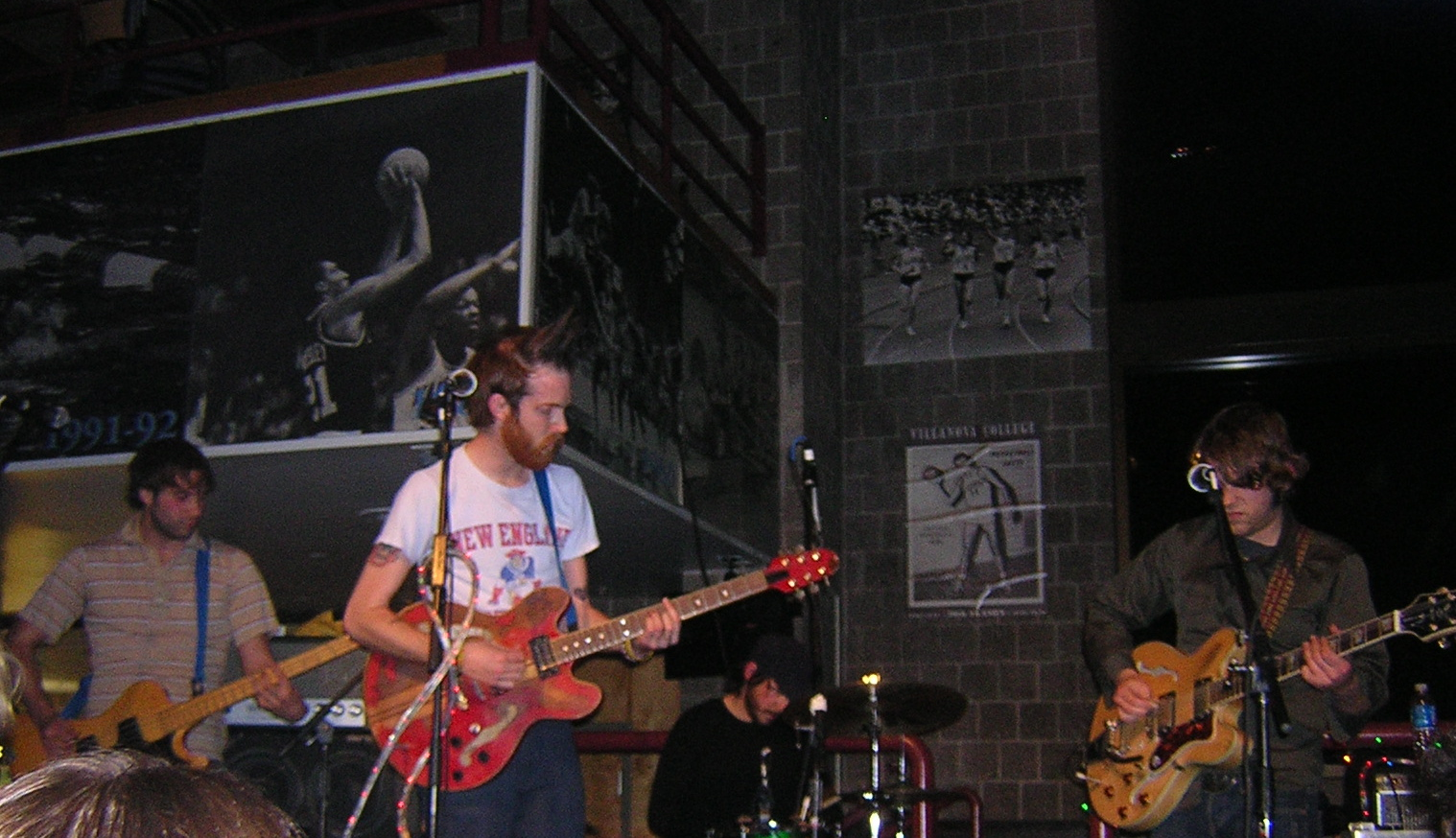

Background information
- Origin: Boston, Massachusetts, U.S.
- Genres: Alternative rock, indie rock, indie folk, psychedelic rock
- Years active: 2003–2010
- Past members: Sam Cohen; Jesse Gallagher; Jeremy Black; Quentin Stoltzfus; Sean Aylward

Apollo Sunshine was an alternative rock band from Boston, Massachusetts. The band was formed in 2003, and decided on its name while band members were throwing words around. They recorded 3 albums - Katonah (2003), Apollo Sunshine (2005), and Shall Noise Upon (2008). The band has been inactive since 2010.

== History ==
=== Founding ===
Sam Cohen, Jesse Gallagher, and Jeremy Black originally met in 1997 in Boston, where the three were attending a Berklee College of Music summer performance program.

=== Albums ===
The band released their first album, Katonah, in 2003 on SpinART records. The album was recorded in Katonah, New York in a barn which the band converted into a studio, and produced by Andy Edelstein, a professor at Berkeley. The first single, "I Was on the Moon", was released in 2003.

The New York Times described their sound as "bouncy 60's-style melodies crack wide open, breaking into outbursts of pummeling and feedback before jumping back into the tune. It's all neatly and cleverly plotted, but with a looming chaos that's anything but nostalgic."

The band released their second album Apollo Sunshine in 2005. In November 2005, it was named to the Amazon.com Best of 2005: Editors' Picks in Rock list at number 5 and the band was featured in Rolling Stone as an "Artist to Watch". Several Boston alternative weeklies declared Apollo Sunshine the best Boston band in their 2005 year-end issues. In 2006, Apollo Sunshine toured with The Slip and Sam Champion en route to SXSW.

Their third album, Shall Noise Upon, was released on vinyl and as a digital download on August 5, 2008. It was released on CD September 2, 2008.

The band has been inactive since 2010.

== Etymology ==
We were just sitting on the couch one day and one said Apollo and someone else said Sunshine and that was it. It just kind of came to us. And then we looked up Apollo in a Greek mythology book and it turns out he's the god of music.

— Jesse Gallagher

== Members ==
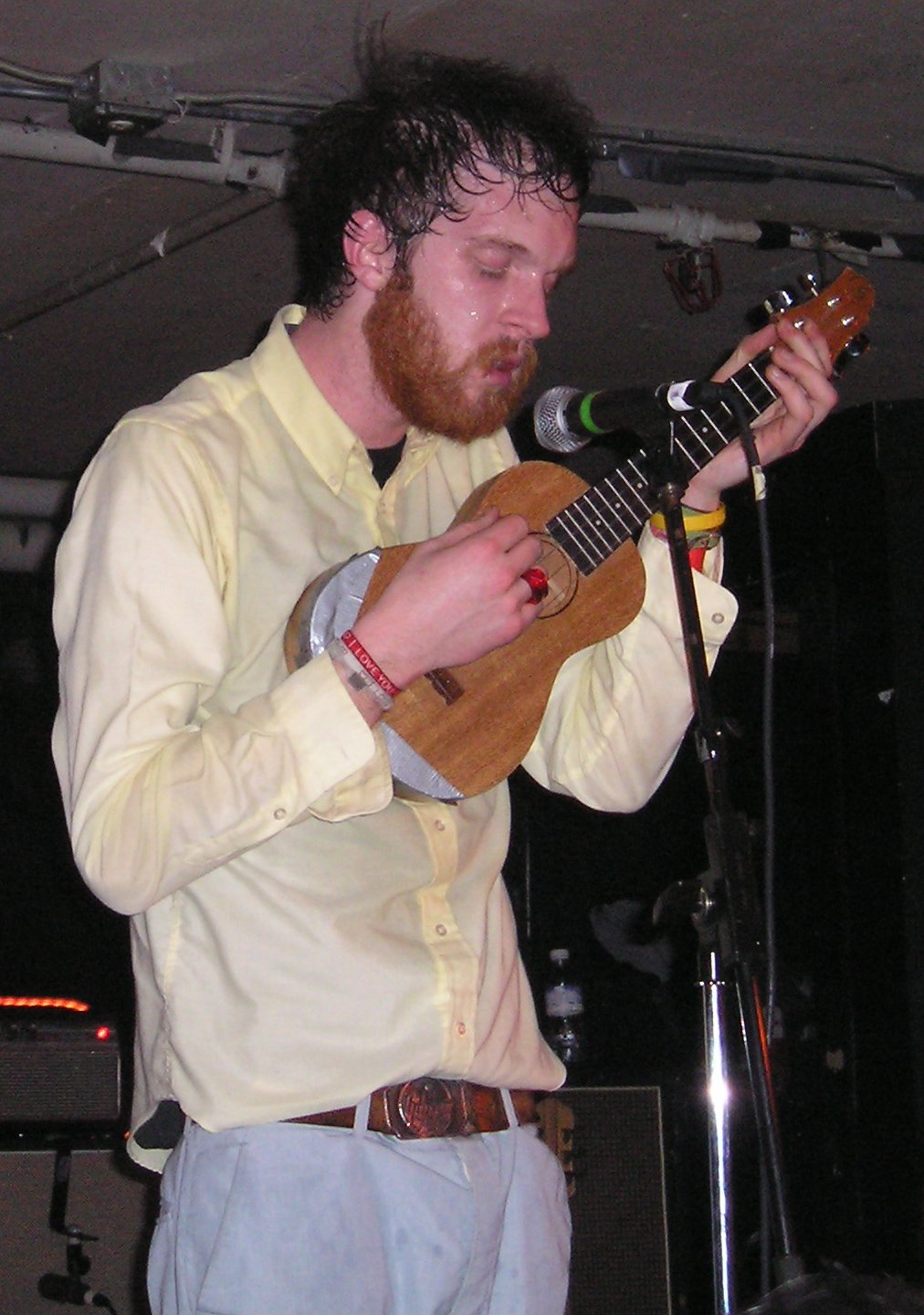
Jesse Gallagher

Current

- Sam Cohen - Guitar, Vocals, Pedal Steel
- Jesse Gallagher - Vocals, Bass, Guitar, Keyboards
- Jeremy Black - Drums

Former

- Oli Rah - Percussion
- Quentin Stoltzfus- Guitar, Vocals
- Sean Aylward - Guitar, Vocals

== Discography ==
=== Studio albums ===
Studio albums by Apollo Sunshine
| Year | Album title | Release details |
|---|---|---|
| 2003 | Katonah | Released: October 7, 2003; Label: spinART; Format: Digital |
| 2005 | Apollo Sunshine | Released: September 13, 2005; Label: spinART; Format: Digital |
| 2008 | Shall Noise Upon | Released: August 5, 2008; Label: Headless Heroes; Format: Digital, vinyl, CD |

=== EPs ===
- The Other Side of the World EP (May 3, 2005)

=== Live albums ===
- Live at the Paradise (2005)

== Sources ==
- James Sullivan What a racket - Apollo Sunshine The Boston Globe, September 2, 2008
- Joan Anderman Critic's picks - pop music - Spare Change Benefit The Boston Globe, August 10, 2008
