= Real Vocal String Quartet =

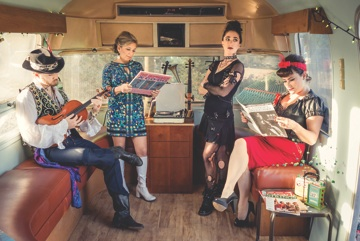
- RVSQ in 2015

Background information
- Origin: San Francisco, California, United States
- Genres: Classical; Vocal Harmony; Jazz; Pop; World Music; Folk
- Years active: 2005-present
- Members: Irene Sazer; Alisa Rose; Matthias McIntire; Jessica Ivry
- Past members: Dina Maccabee
- Website: www.rvsq.com

Real Vocal String Quartet is a string-instrument and vocal ensemble who compose, arrange, improvise and perform music a wide range of musical genres. The group of classically trained musicians combine world music, jazz, pop, and international folk with traditional chamber music in innovative ways.

== History ==
RVSQ was formed in 2005 by Irene Sazer, previously a founding member of the Turtle Island Quartet. She brought together conservatory-trained professional musicians, including Sazer and Alisa Rose on violin, Matthias McIntire on viola, and Jessica Ivry on cello. Dina Maccabee was the original violist and played for eight years.

In 2010 the group released a self-titled CD on Flower Note Records, leading the Christian Science Monitor to compare them to the Kronos Quartet

In 2011, Real Vocal String Quartet recorded with Feist on her album, Metals, and subsequently performed with her in Canada and the United States, including the Coachella Festival and the Tonight Show with Jay Leno. In 2012, the group was chosen by American Voices and the U.S. Department of State to tour Eastern Europe as cultural ambassadors through the American Music Abroad program. The group performed and collaborated with musicians in each country.

RSVQ's second album, titled Four Little Sisters, was released in October 2012.
