= The Bandana Splits =

Pop music group

- Origin: Brooklyn, NY
- Genres: Pop
- Years active: 2011–present
- Label: Boy Scout Recordings
- Members: Annie Nero; Dawn Landes; Lauren Balthrop
- Website: myspace.com/thebandanasplits

The Bandana Splits are a pop-trio from New York City. The group is made up by Annie Nero, Dawn Landes, and Lauren Balthrop. In August 2011, the group released their first full-length album Mr. Sam Presents through Boy Scout Recordings. The trio performed at the Metropolitan Museum of Art’s annual tree lighting from 2011-2015 which resulted in a 2015 holiday EP.
