= Mystery Girl (song) =

Single by Alexandra Savior

from the album Belladonna of Sadness
- Released: November 18, 2016
- Genre: Dream pop; desert rock; psychedelic rock
- Length: 5:36
- Label: Columbia
- Songwriters: Alexandra Savior; Alex Turner
- Producers: James Ford; Alex Turner

Alexandra Savior singles chronology
"M.T.M.E." (2016)	"Mystery Girl" (2016)	"Mirage" (2017)

"Mystery Girl" is the third single by American singer-songwriter Alexandra Savior from her album Belladonna of Sadness. It was released on November 18, 2016 via Columbia Records. A music video for the song was released on November 21, 2016, directed by Savior and New Zealand director Sam Kristofski.

== Personnel ==
- Alexandra Savior – vocals
- Alex Turner – bass guitar, guitar, keyboards, synthesizers
- James Ford – drums, percussion, keyboards, synthesizers
