= Fireproof (Dawn Landes album) =

Studio album by Dawn Landes
- Released: January 21, 2008
- Recorded: 2007
- Genre: Indie rock
- Length: 40:27
- Label: Fargo Records
- Producer: Dawn Landes, Adam Lasus, Gary Maurer

Dawn Landes chronology
Two Three Four (2006)	Fireproof (2008)	Sweet Heart Rodeo (2009)

Fireproof is an album by the American singer-songwriter Dawn Landes. The album was released in January 2008 in Europe on Fargo Records, and March 4, 2008, in the United States on Cooking Vinyl Records.

The song "You Alone" was featured in the 2005 film Winter Passing.

== Track listing ==
No.	Title	Length
1.	"Bodyguard"	3:51
2.	"I Don't Need No Man"	3:05
3.	"Tired of This Life"	3:01
4.	"Twilight"	3:20
5.	"Private Little Hell"	2:43
6.	"Picture Show"	3:10
7.	"Kids in a Play"	3:24
8.	"Toy Piano"	1:30
9.	"Dig Me a Hole"	3:08
10.	"I'm in Love with the Night"	3:39
11.	"Goodnight Lover"	2:45
12.	"You Alone"	6:57
13.	"I Won't Back Down" (hidden track)	2:27
Total length:		40:27
