= Connie Converse =

American musician (born 1924)

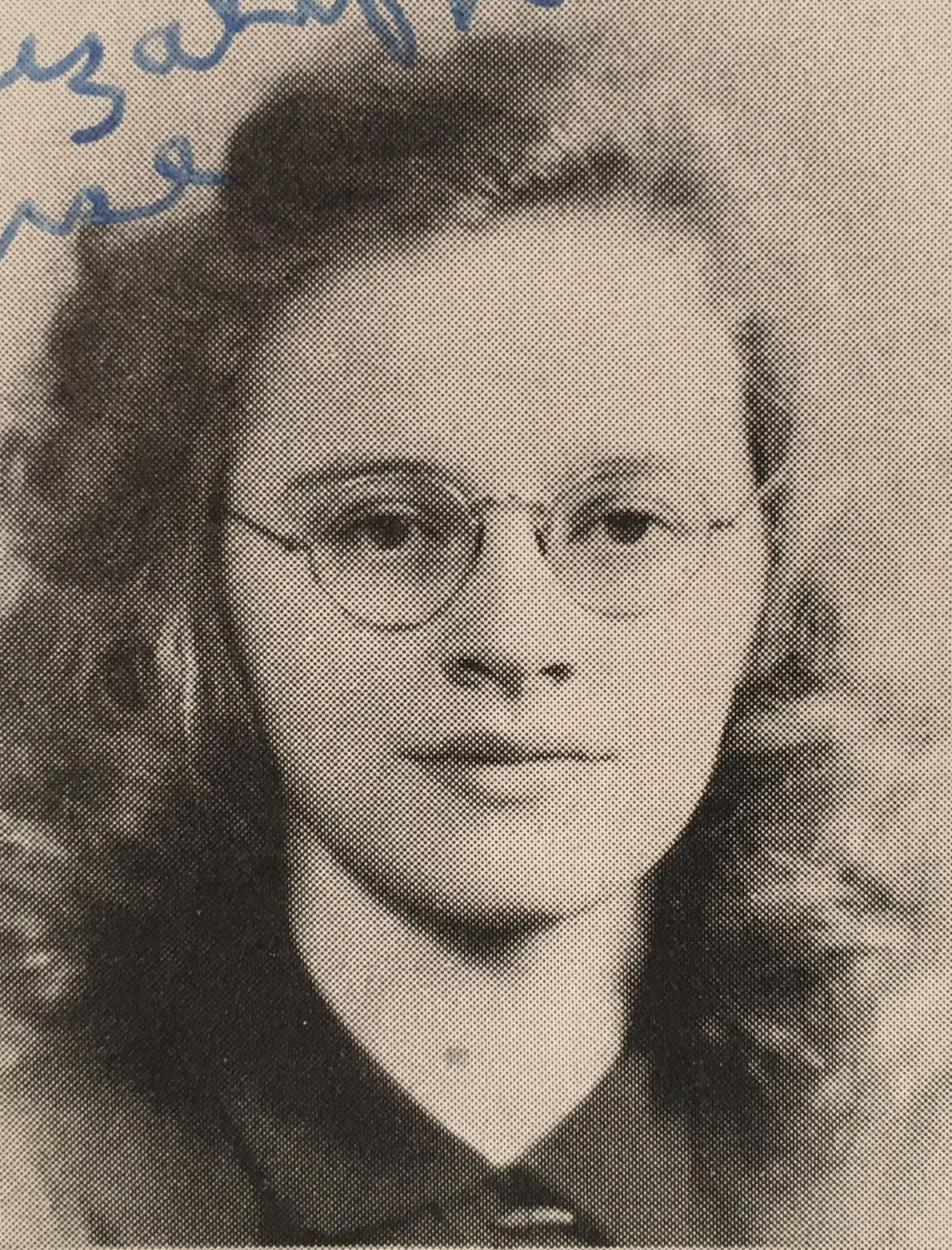
- Converse in 1942
- Born: Elizabeth Eaton Converse; August 3, 1924; Laconia, New Hampshire, U.S.
- Disappeared: August 10, 1974 (aged 50); Ann Arbor, Michigan, U.S.
- Status: Missing for 52 years, 2 months and 1 day
- Occupations: Singer-songwriter, guitarist, composer, secretary, managing editor
- Musical career
- Instruments: Vocals, guitar, piano
- Years active: Early 1950s–1974
- Label: Squirrel Thing Recordings
- Website: Connie Converse

Elizabeth Eaton Converse (born August 3, 1924 – disappeared August 10, 1974) was an American singer-songwriter, best known under her professional name Connie Converse. She was active in New York City in the 1950s, and her work is among the earliest known recordings in the singer-songwriter genre of music in the U.S. Before and after the period in which she wrote her music she was an academic, writer, and assistant editor for the Far Eastern Survey (IPR, New York), and editor for the Journal of Conflict Resolution (University of Michigan, Ann Arbor).

In 1974, Converse left her family home in search of a new life and was not seen or heard from again. Despite the obscurity of her music during her lifetime, her work gained recognition after it was featured on a 2004 radio show. In March 2009, a compilation album of her work, How Sad, How Lovely, was released.

== Early life ==
Converse was born on August 3, 1924, in Laconia, New Hampshire. She was raised in Concord, New Hampshire, as the middle child in a strict Baptist family; her father was a minister and her mother was "musical", according to music historian David Garland. Her elder brother by three years was Paul Converse; her younger brother by five years, Philip Converse, became a prominent political scientist.

Converse attended Concord High School, where she was valedictorian and won eight academic awards, including an academic scholarship to Mount Holyoke College in Massachusetts. After two years' study, she left Mount Holyoke and moved to New York City.

== Career ==
During the 1950s, Converse worked for the Academy Photo Offset printing house in New York's Flatiron District. She first lived in Greenwich Village, then in Hell's Kitchen and Harlem. She started calling herself Connie, a nickname she had acquired in New York. She began writing songs and performing them for friends, accompanying herself on guitar. She began smoking and drinking during this time, behaviors contrary to her religious upbringing. Possibly as a result of her changes in behavior, her parents rejected her music career. It was thought that her father never heard her sing, but a tape recording of a family visit in 1952 reveals that Converse sang for her father and mother in her apartment in Grove Street, New York.

In 1954, Converse was encouraged by a friend to perform at a music salon hosted by the graphic artist and audio enthusiast Gene Deitch, who recorded the performance. Converse's only known public performance was a brief television appearance in 1954 on The Morning Show on CBS with Walter Cronkite, which Deitch had helped to arrange. In 1956, she recorded an album for her brother Philip, Musicks (Volumes I and II). By 1961, Converse had grown frustrated trying to sell her music in New York. That year, she moved to Ann Arbor, Michigan, where her brother was a professor of political science at the University of Michigan. Converse worked in a secretarial job, and then as a writer for and managing editor of the Journal of Conflict Resolution in 1963.

== Activism ==
Converse spent many years after being a performer as an activist writing memos like Converse's "FEDD" Memo Against Racism and publishing her thoughts on the House Un-American Activities Committee (HUAC).

Around 1968–69, Converse wrote a memo as a white member of People Against Racism. Written as a seven-and-a-half page memo under the heading "AN EXPERIMENT TOWARD 'IDEOLOGICAL' CONSULTATION" outlined in five sections lettered A to E. Section A covered the "Basics" such as "Me and My goals" and strategies like "There is probably no one 'correct method' of combating white racism. Neither racism nor society itself is that simple." Section B was an expansion on the basics. Section C defined what "FEDD" stood for: "I am coming to realize that the essence of racism is a 'frozen' pattern of exploitative domination/dependence between persons and between groups."

The overall memo reads like a manifesto to eliminate white racism and confront the structural or institutional oppressive forces that "perpetuate the status of black people as perennial losers in my society."

In a 2023 New York Times article framing Converse as a hidden figure akin to Bob Dylan, biographer Howard Fishman wrote on her time at the Institute of Pacific Affairs, "Ms. Converse lost her job when the institute landed in the cross hairs of the anti-Communist House Un-American Activities Committee." In Fishman's biography of Converse, To Anyone Who Ever Asks (2023), her published thoughts are recorded on the witch hunt that followed and targeted her colleagues, including Owen Lattimore, editor of the Pacific Affairs (a journal published by the institute), whom Joseph McCarthy accused of being "the top Soviet agent in North America." Fishman, quoting Converse, writes:

We have become a nation of awful paradox: hysteria inlaid with unconcern, literacy woven with misconception, democracy wrapped up in tyranny, boldness nailed down by fear. I have no doubt of the outcome, but I dread the interval.

== Personal life ==
Converse was private about her personal life. According to Deitch, she would respond to questions about her personal life with curt "yes" or "no" answers. Both Deitch and Connie's brother Philip have said it is possible she might have been a lesbian, although she never confirmed or denied this notion. Her nephew Tim Converse has said there is no evidence that she was ever involved in a romantic relationship. Her family noted that Connie relied more heavily on smoking and drinking towards the end of her time living in Michigan.

== Disappearance ==
By 1973, Converse was burnt out and depressed. The offices of the Journal of Conflict Resolution, which meant so much to her, had moved to Yale at the end of 1972 after being "auctioned off" without her knowledge. Converse's colleagues and friends pooled their money to give her a six-month trip to England in hopes of improving her mood, to no avail. Her mother requested that she join her on a trip to Alaska, and Converse grudgingly agreed. Her displeasure with the trip appeared to have contributed to her decision to disappear. Around that time, Converse was told by doctors that she needed a hysterectomy, and the information appeared to have devastated her according to her brother.

In August 1974, days after her 50th birthday, Converse wrote a series of letters to family and friends suggesting her intention to make a new life in New York City. All were handwritten, according to author Howard Fishman, who wrote her biography (titled after a letter she typed and left behind in her filing cabinet):

TO ANYONE WHO EVER ASKS: (If I'm Long Unheard From)

This is the thin hard sublayer under all the parting messages I'm likely to have sent: let me go, let me be if I can, let me not be if I can't. For a number of years now I've been the object of affectionate concern to my relatives and many friends in Ann Arbor; have received not just financial but spiritual support from them; have made a number of efforts, in this benign situation to get a new toe-hold on the lively world. Have failed.

...In the months after I got back from my desperate flight to England I began to realize that my new personal incapabilities were still stubbornly hanging in. I did fight; but they hung in.

...To survive it all, I expect I must drift back down through the other half of the twentieth twentieth, which I already know pretty well, to the hundredth twentieth, which I have only heard about. I might survive there quite a few years—who knows? But you understand I have to do it with no benign umbrella. Human society fascinates me & awes me & fills me with grief & joy; I just can't find my place to plug into it.

So let me go, please; and please accept my thanks for those happy times...I am in everyone's debt.

In a different letter to Philip, Converse included a check and a request that he make sure that her health insurance was paid for and in good standing for a certain amount of time following her departure, but for him to cease paying the policy on a certain date.

Converse was expected to join an annual family trip to a lake, but by the time the letters were delivered, she had packed her belongings in her Volkswagen Beetle and driven away, never to be heard from again. The events of her life following her disappearance remain unknown. Several years after she left, someone told her brother that they had seen a phone book listing for "Elizabeth Converse" in either Kansas or Oklahoma, but he never pursued the lead.

About ten years after she disappeared, the family hired a private investigator in hopes of finding her. The investigator told them that even if he did find her, it was her right to disappear and he could not bring her back. After that, her family respected her decision to leave, and ceased looking for her.

== Legacy ==
In January 2004, Deitch—by then 80 years old and having lived in Prague since 1959—was invited by New York music historian David Garland to appear on his WNYC radio show Spinning on Air. Deitch played some of the recordings of Converse he had made on a reel-to-reel tape recorder, including her song "One by One". Two of Garland's listeners, Dan Dzula and David Herman, were inspired to track down any additional recordings of Converse. They found two sources for Converse's music: Deitch's collection in Prague, and a filing cabinet in Ann Arbor containing recordings which Converse had sent to Philip in the late 1950s. In March 2009, How Sad, How Lovely, containing 17 songs by Converse, was released by Lau Derette Recordings. That same month, Spinning on Air broadcast an hour-long special about Converse's life and music. Garland also explored the mystery surrounding her disappearance with recordings from Philip Converse and readings of her letters by actress Amber Benson.

In 2015, How Sad, How Lovely was released as an 18-track vinyl recording by Squirrel Thing Recordings, in partnership with the Captured Tracks label. The album has received favorable reviews, including by Los Angeles Times music critic Randall Roberts, who wrote, "Few reissues of the past decade have struck me with more continued, joyous affection as How Sad, How Lovely." The Australian singer-songwriter Robert Forster describes the album as "making a deep and marvelous connection between lyric and song that allows us to enter the world of an extraordinary woman living in mid-twentieth-century New York."

Apart from her 1954 appearance on The Morning Show; cabaret performances by singer Annette Warren, who featured Converse's songs "The Playboy of the Western World" and "The Witch and the Wizard" in her act for decades; and a performance of her music in 1961 by folksinger Susan Reed at the Kaufmann Concert Hall in New York, Converse's music was not available to the public until it resurfaced in 2004. Since the 2009 release of her album, however, Converse's life and music have been the subject of news reports around the world. In addition to the mystery surrounding her disappearance, many of these articles focus on the content and style of Converse's music—and the possibility that she may be the earliest performer in the singer-songwriter genre. According to Garland, "Converse wrote and sang back in the 1950s, long before singer-songwriter was a recognized category or style. But everything we value in singer-songwriters today—personal perspective, insight, originality, empathy, intelligence, wry humor—was abundant in her music." Others cite the feminine experience often explored in her lyrics, as well as the themes of sexuality and individualism found in her songs as the reason Converse's music was ahead of its time.

Converse's life and music have served as the inspiration for numerous contemporary artworks, including a play by Howard Fishman, who also produced the album Connie's Piano Songs featuring music written but never recorded by Converse. Fishman also published a biography of Converse in 2023 titled To Anyone Who Ever Asks. Other works inspired by Converse include the modern dance piece "Empty Pockets" by John Heginbotham, which was performed at the Miller Theater in 2015; British singer Nat Johnson's "Roving Woman" tribute performances; as well as tribute performances of Converse's music by Jean Rohe and Diane Cluck as part of the 2012 Spinning on Air 25th-anniversary special.

In 2017, John Zorn's Tzadik Records released the album Vanity of Vanities: A Tribute to Connie Converse, featuring new recordings of her songs by performers including Mike Patton, Petra Haden, Karen O, and Laurie Anderson. "Memories of Winter", the final track on Canadian singer-songwriter Dana Gavanski's 2020 debut album Yesterday Is Gone, is an homage to Converse. Talking Like Her, a feature documentary first broadcast by SVT in 2021 explored the life, music, and disappearance of Converse. Directed by Natacha Giler and Adam Briscoe, the film has been screened at numerous festivals worldwide and has received positive reviews.

Classical singer Julia Bullock sang Converse's "One by One" on her album Walking in the Dark, which takes its title from that song. Walking in the Dark won Best Classical Solo Vocal Album at the 66th Grammy Awards.

In 2024, singer-songwriter Hope Levy debuted "The Connie Converse Universe by Hope Levy", a 55-minute cabaret in which audiences are invited to explore the songs, life, and mystery surrounding Connie Converse, the first modern-day female folk singer-songwriter. The World Premiere received the Outstanding Musical award at the 2024 San Diego International Fringe Festival. Directed by Tom Lavagnino, the one-woman cabaret has been performed at a number of venues and festivals, with critical acclaim.

A documentary was broadcast on BBC Radio 4 in December 2024 entitled Dreaming of Connie Converse. In it, poet Emily Berry explored her music and her life. The 2022 independent film Roving Woman is dedicated to her.

== Discography ==
- How Sad, How Lovely (2009; 2015 reissue)
- Sad Lady (2020)
- Musicks (2023)

Tribute albums:

- Connie's Piano Songs (2014) (written by Converse; performed by others)
- Vanity of Vanities: A Tribute to Connie Converse (2017) (written by Converse)

== Publications ==
- Converse, Elizabeth (1949). "Administrative Merger for Papua and New Guinea". Far Eastern Survey. 18 (11). Institute of Pacific Relations: 129. doi:10.2307/3024249. JSTOR 3024249.
- Converse, Elizabeth (1949). "The United States as Trustee—I". Far Eastern Survey. 18 (22). Institute of Pacific Relations: 260–263. doi:10.2307/3023713. JSTOR 3023713.
- Converse, Elizabeth (1949). "The United States as Trustee—II". Far Eastern Survey. 18 (24). Institute of Pacific Relations: 277–283. doi:10.2307/3023734. JSTOR 3023734.
- Converse, Elizabeth (1949). "Formosa: Private Citadel?". Far Eastern Survey. 18 (21). Institute of Pacific Relations: 249–250. doi:10.2307/3024156. JSTOR 3024156.
- Converse, Elizabeth (1951). "Pilot Development Projects in India". Far Eastern Survey. 20 (3). Institute of Pacific Relations: 21–27. doi:10.2307/3024397. JSTOR 3024397.
- Keeffe, Emily C; Converse, Elizabeth (1952). The Japanese leaders program of the Department of the Army; an evaluative report of the program and its conduct by the Institute of International Education, 1950-1951 (Report). New York, N.Y.: Institute of International Education. OCLC 4822683.
- Converse, Elizabeth (1972). "A posteditorial". Journal of Conflict Resolution. 16 (4): 617–619. doi:10.1177/002200277201600410.
- Converse, Elizabeth (1968). "The war of all against all: A review of The Journal of Conflict Resolution, 1957–1968". Journal of Conflict Resolution. 12: 471–532. doi:10.1177/002200276801200404.
- Kodama, Gentarō (1945). "The Kodama report translation of Japanese plan for aggression, 1902" (Document). Translated by Elizabeth, Converse. Institute of Pacific Relations American Council. (The document is a translation to English of the so-called Kodama report as it was published in the French newspaper l'Echo de Paris in three parts on January 10, 11 and 12, 1905 with an introduction and separate responses. The report and the translation is discussed in: Kerr, George (1945). "Kodama Report: Plan for Conquest". Far Eastern Survey. 14 (14). Institute of Pacific Relations: 185–190. doi:10.2307/3021570. JSTOR 3021570.
- Converse, Elizabeth; Kelman, Herbert C.; Vandenberg, Edward L. (1966). "Alternative perspectives on Vietnam : report on an international conference". Alternative perspectives on Vietnam : report on an international conference. Alternative perspectives on Vietnam, University of Michigan, Ann Arbor, September 13–17, 1965. Ithaca, N.Y.: Inter-University Committee for Debate on Foreign Policy. OCLC 2464412.
- Converse, Elizabeth (1969). Domestic and Foreign Conflicts of England, 1350-1950 (PDF) (Technical report). Center for Research on Conflict Resolution.
- Converse, Jean M.; Schuman, Howard (1974). Conversations at Random: Survey Research as Interviewers See it. Illustrations by Elizabeth E. Converse. Wiley. ISBN 9780471168690.

== See also ==
- List of people who disappeared mysteriously (1970s)
