= Josh Tillman discography =

American singer-songwriter discography

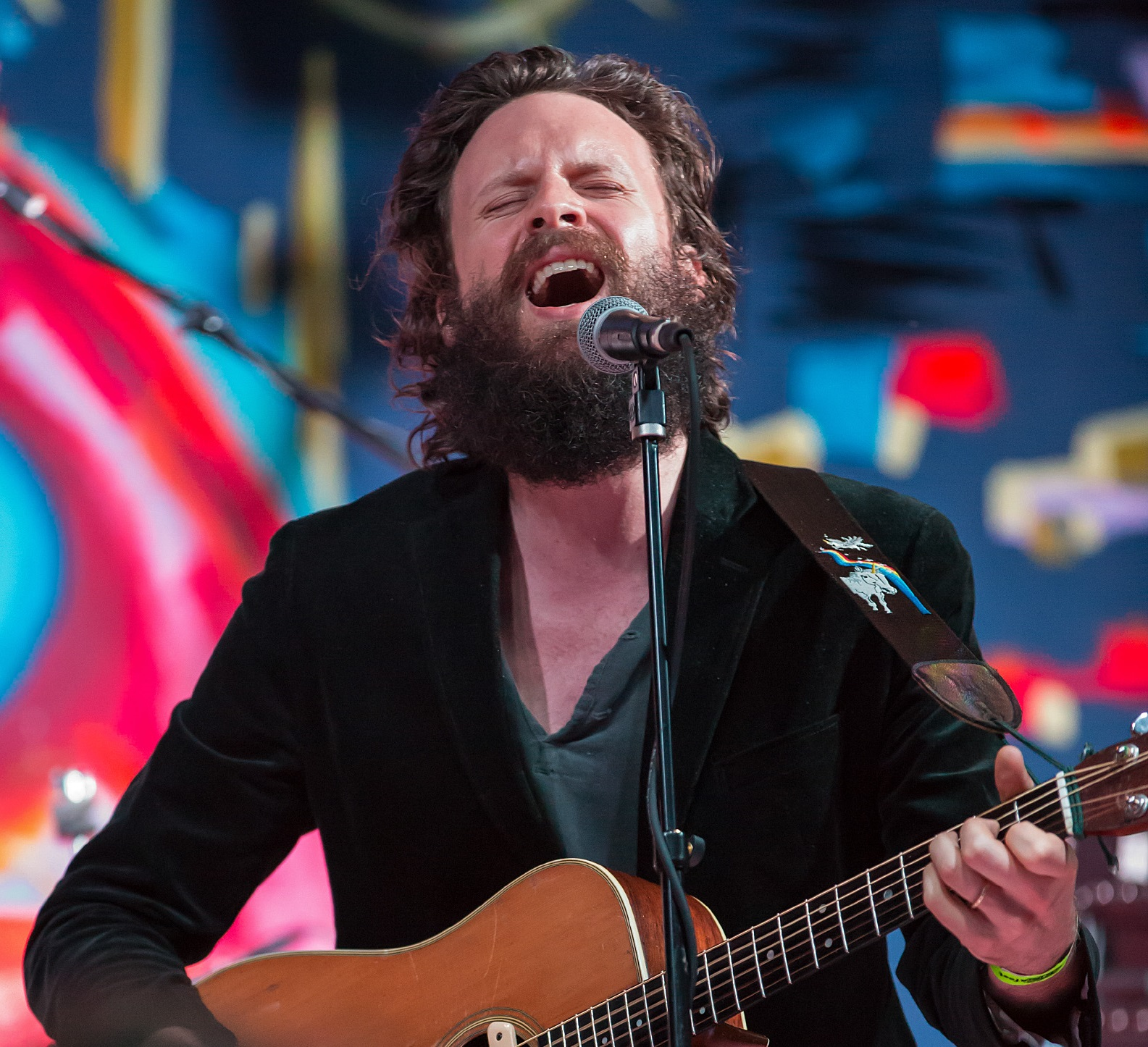
- Tillman performing as Father John Misty at Utopia Fest at Utopia, Texas in 2014
- Studio albums: 15
- EPs: 6
- Live albums: 1
- Singles: 18

The discography of Josh Tillman, an American singer-songwriter, consists of fifteen studio albums, six EPs, seventeen singles, a soundtrack and several contributions.

== Albums ==
=== as J. Tillman ===
- Business of the Heart (unreleased demos recorded at Bluebrick Recordings)
- Untitled No. 1 (Broken Factory, 2003)
- I Will Return (self-released, 2004)
- Long May You Run, J. Tillman (Keep Recordings, 2006)
- Minor Works (Fargo, 2006)
- Cancer and Delirium (Yer Bird, 2007)
- Vacilando Territory Blues (Western Vinyl, 2009) – UK #191
- Year in the Kingdom (Western Vinyl, 2009)
- Singing Ax (Western Vinyl, 2010)

=== as Father John Misty ===
List of studio albums, with selected chart positions and certifications
Title	Album details	Peak chart positions										Certifications
Title	Album details	US	AUS	BEL (FL)	FRA	IRE	NL	NZ	SWE	SWI	UK	Certifications
Fear Fun	Released: April 30, 2012 (Europe); Label: Sub Pop (970), Bella Union (332); Formats: LP, CD, digital download	123	—	79	—	—	—	—	—	—	—	
I Love You, Honeybear	Released: February 9, 2015 (Europe); Label: Sub Pop (1115), Bella Union (476); Formats: 2×LP, CD, digital download	17	38	54	104	12	27	36	36	—	14	BPI: Silver
Pure Comedy	Released: April 7, 2017; Label: Sub Pop, Bella Union; Formats: 2×LP, CD, digital download	10	14	25	121	7	16	37	18	32	8	
God's Favorite Customer	Released: June 1, 2018; Label: Sub Pop, Bella Union; Formats: LP, CD, digital download	18	9	32	131	11	34	— (Note: God's Favourite Customer did not enter the NZ Top 40 Albums Chart, but peaked at number two on the NZ Heatseeker Albums Chart.)	32	55	12	
Chloë and the Next 20th Century	Released: April 8, 2022; Label: Sub Pop, Bella Union; Formats: 2xLP, CD, digital download	28	63	47	—	47	55	—	—	47	2	
Mahashmashana	Released: November 22, 2024; Label: Sub Pop, Bella Union; Formats: LP, CD, digital download	161	—	—	—	—	—	—	—	—	12	
"—" denotes a recording that did not chart or was not released in that territory.

=== with Fleet Foxes ===
- Helplessness Blues (Sub Pop, May 3, 2011)

=== with Saxon Shore ===
- Be a Bright Blue (Broken Factory Records, 2002)
- Four Months of Darkness (Burnt Toast Vinyl, 2003)

Live albums

- Off-Key in Hamburg (2020)

== Extended plays ==
=== as J. Tillman ===
- Documented (self-released, 2006)
- Isle Land DVD/EP (Bella Union, 2008)
- Laminar Excursion Monthly #8 (Procession at Night) (Crossroads of America Records/Flannelgraph Records, 2010)

=== as Father John Misty ===
- The Demos (Sub Pop, 2012)
- "I Luv You HB" Demos (Sub Pop/Bella Union, 2015)
- Anthem +3 (Sub Pop/Bella Union, 2020)
- Live at Electric Lady (Sub Pop, 2022)

== Soundtracks ==
- The History of Caves (Sub Pop, 2013) (Soundtrack, as Josh Tillman)

== Singles ==
Title	Year	Peak chart positions				Certifications	Album
Title	Year	US AAA	US Airplay	SCO	UK	Certifications	Album
"Wild Honey Never Stolen / Borne Away on a Black Barge"	2009	—	—	—	—		Non-album single
"Hollywood Forever Cemetery Sings"	2012	—	—	—	—		Fear Fun
"Hollywood Forever Cemetery Sings / Drive"	2014	—	—	—	—		Non-album single
"Bored in the USA"	2014	—	—	—	—		I Love You Honeybear
"Chateau Lobby #4 (In C for Two Virgins)"	2014	19	—	—	—		I Love You Honeybear
"I Loved You Honeybee/I've Never Been a Woman"	2015	—	—	—	— (Note: "I Loved You Honeybee/I've Never Been a Woman" did not enter the UK Singles Chart, but peaked at number 31 on the UK Physical Singles Chart.)		Non-album single
"The Angry River"	2015	—	—	—	—		True Detective Soundtrack
"Real Love Baby"	2016	30	—	—	— (Note: "Real Love Baby" did not enter the UK Singles Chart, but peaked at number 3 on the UK Physical Singles Chart.)	RIAA: 2× Platinum	Non-album single
"Pure Comedy"	2017	—	—	—	—		Pure Comedy
"Two Wildly Different Perspectives"	2017	—	—	—			Pure Comedy
"Ballad of the Dying Man"	2017	25	—	—	—		Pure Comedy
"Total Entertainment Forever"	2017	21	—	—	—		Pure Comedy
"Mr. Tillman"	2018	17	—	—	—		God's Favourite Customer
"Disappointing Diamonds Are the Rarest of Them All / Just Dumb Enough to Try"	2018	—	—	—	—		God's Favourite Customer
"Anthem"	2020	—	—	56	— (Note: "Anthem" did not enter the UK Singles Chart, but peaked at number 77 on the UK Singles Downloads Chart.)		Anthem +3
"To S. / To R."	2020	—	—	—	—		Non-album single
"Funny Girl"	2022	—	—	—	—		Chloë and the Next 20th Century
"Goodbye, Mr. Blue"	2022	24	—	—	—		Chloë and the Next 20th Century
"She Cleans Up"	2024	16	39	—	—		Mahashmashana
"The Old Law"	2026	—	7	—	—		Non-album single
"The Payoff"	2026	—	—	—	—		Non-album single
"The X-panded Universe"	2026	—	—	—	—		Non-album single
"—" denotes singles that did not chart or were not released

=== Other certified songs ===
Title	Year	Certifications	Album				
Title	Year	Certifications	Album	"Nancy From Now On"	2012	RIAA: Gold	Fear Fun

=== Miscellaneous ===
Contributions

- Demon Hunter – Demon Hunter (additional drums), Tooth & Nail Records, 2002
- Kid Cudi – "Young Lady" (feat. Father John Misty) – (Indicud, Republic Records, April 2013)
- Emile Haynie – "Ballerina's Reprise" (feat. Father John Misty and Julia Holter) – (We Fall, Interscope Records, February 2014)
- Botany – "Laughtrack" (feat. Father John Misty) – (not on album, Western Vinyl, October 2014). Free, digital download only.
- Beyoncé – "Hold Up" (writing credits) (April 2016)
- The Avalanches – "Saturday Night Inside Out" (feat. Father John Misty and David Berman) – (Wildflower, Modular, July 2016)
- Florence + the Machine – "Wish That You Were Here" (drums, additional vocals) – (Island, August 2016)
- Brad Neely's Harg Nallin' Sclopio Peepio – "This is America with Father John Misty" (September 2016)
- Lady Gaga – "Sinner's Prayer", "Come to Mama" (writing credits) – (Joanne, Interscope Records, October 2016)
- Florence + the Machine - "100 Years" (additional guitar) - (High as Hope, Republic Records and Virgin EMI Records, June 2018)
- Lana Del Rey – "Let The Light In" – (Did You Know That There's a Tunnel Under Ocean Blvd, Interscope Records, March 2023)

Covers

- "Tillman Sings 'Tonight's the Night'" (self released, exclusively for Aquarium Drunkard, September 13, 2010) (as J. Tillman). Free, digital download only. Cover album of Neil Young's album Tonight's the Night (Reprise Records, 1975)
- "Hollywood Forever Cemetery Sings / Drive" (Bella Union, August 1, 2014). Cover of "Drive" by Marissa Nadler.
