= Greatish Hits: I Followed My Dreams and My Dreams Said to Crawl =

- Digital cover

Greatest hits album by Father John Misty
- Released: July 31, 2024
- Length: 70:49
- Label: Sub Pop

Father John Misty chronology
Chloë and the Next 20th Century (2022)	Greatish Hits: I Followed My Dreams and My Dreams Said to Crawl (2024)	Mahashmashana (2024)

Greatish Hits: I Followed My Dreams and My Dreams Said to Crawl is a greatest hits album by American musician Josh Tillman under the stage name Father John Misty. It was released on July 31, 2024, digitally, and physically on August 16, 2024. It contains songs from all of Tillman's albums released under the Father John Misty moniker, along with one new song, "I Guess Time Just Makes Fools of Us All", and Tillman's 2016 single "Real Love Baby". Tillman had previously performed the then-unreleased "I Guess Time Just Makes Fools of Us All" as early as 2019 and throughout multiple shows in 2023; he subsequently announced the song through text message to fans on his newsletter with the suggestion of a compilation album to follow later.

== Track listing ==
All songs written by Josh Tillman.

Greatish Hits: I Followed My Dreams and My Dreams Said to Crawl track listing
No.	Title	Origin	Length
1.	"Real Love Baby"	Non-album single, 2016	3:09
2.	"Nancy from Now On"	Fear Fun, 2012	3:54
3.	"Disappointing Diamonds Are the Rarest of Them All"	God's Favorite Customer, 2018	2:23
4.	"Chateau Lobby #4 (In C for Two Virgins)"	I Love You, Honeybear, 2015	2:51
5.	"Goodbye Mr. Blue"	Chloë and the Next 20th Century, 2022	5:00
6.	"When You're Smiling and Astride Me"	I Love You, Honeybear	4:33
7.	"Mr. Tillman"	God's Favorite Customer	3:03
8.	"Things It Would Have Been Helpful to Know Before the Revolution"	Pure Comedy, 2017	4:18
9.	"Please Don't Die"	God's Favorite Customer	3:24
10.	"I'm Writing a Novel"	Fear Fun	3:35
11.	"Buddy's Rendezvous"	Chloë and the Next 20th Century	4:59
12.	"Total Entertainment Forever"	Pure Comedy	2:53
13.	"Hollywood Forever Cemetery Sings"	Fear Fun	3:10
14.	"Holy Shit"	I Love You, Honeybear	4:01
15.	"Pure Comedy"	Pure Comedy	6:23
16.	"I Love You, Honeybear"	I Love You, Honeybear	4:38
17.	"I Guess Time Just Makes Fools of Us All"	Mahashmashana, 2024	8:35
