= David Vandervelde =

American songwriter

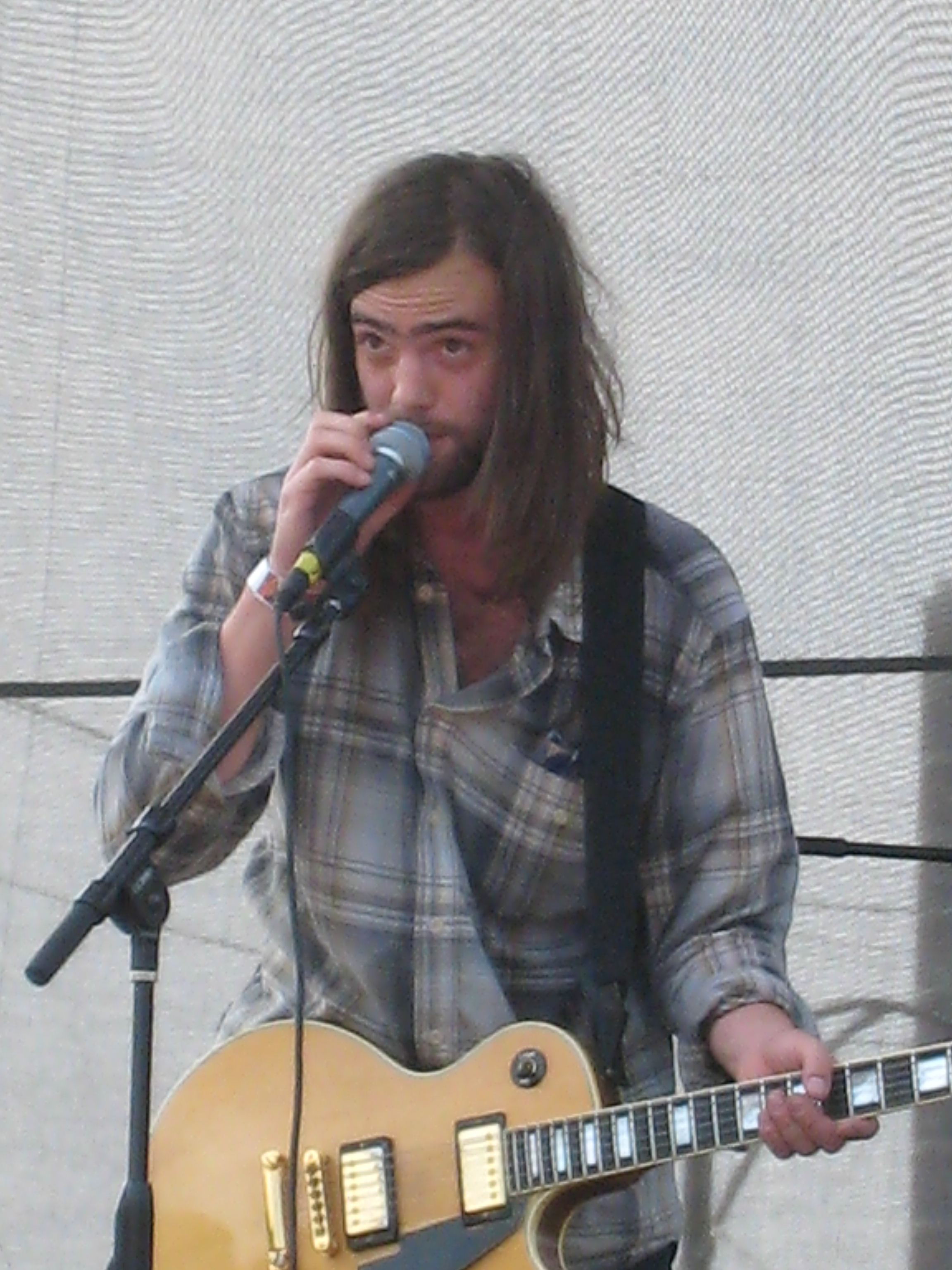
- David Vandervelde at Lollapalooza, 2007

Background information
- Label: Secretly Canadian

David Vandervelde is an American indie pop songwriter, producer, and multi-instrumentalist. He is known for his solo work and his studio collaborations with Wilco's Jay Bennett.

As of 2014, Vandervelde has been a member of Father John Misty's touring band. He appears on Misty's studio albums, God's Favorite Customer (2018) and Mahashmashana (2024), where he has a co-writing credit on the track, "Being You".

== Career ==
In 2003, Vandervelde moved to Grand Rapids, Michigan where he began recording local bands and friends in his basement studio. When Fonic Records heard the demo Vandervelde recorded for Brie Stoner, the label signed Stoner, pairing Vandervelde with ex-Wilco guitarist Jay Bennett to produce a debut at Bennett's Pieholden Studio in Chicago. After the album's release in 2004, Vandervelde began living at Piehoden, working with Bennett on solo work and other recording projects.

Living and working at Pieholden, Vandervelde began a writing and recording streak that would provide the bulk of the material on his debut solo record. During this period, Vandervelde also played on the Jay Bennett albums Bigger than Blue and The Magnificent Defeat. In 2007, Secretly Canadian Records released the first David Vandervelde solo album, The Moonstation House Band. Culled from the one-man band sessions at Bennett's studio, the album won praise for its winning melodies and dense arrangements. Vandervelde's sound drew comparisons to T. Rex.

Following its release, Vandervelde relocated to Brooklyn, New York. In 2008, he released his sophomore effort, Waiting for the Sunrise. In April 2008, he moved to Nashville, Tennessee.

Since 2015, he has been touring with Josh Tillman ("Father John Misty") on the I Love You, Honeybear the Pure Comedy, and the God's Favorite Customer tours as a guitarist, but also playing additional instruments on stage. In 2016, as part of the duo Tess and Dave, he opened for Father John Misty across many of the North American tour dates.

Over the course of 2015–2016, he also engineered and produced Book of Changes by Entrance (2017).

Vandervelde now resides in the Long Beach, California area when not on tour.

== Discography ==
=== Jacket/Murder in Michigan [EP] ===
Released only as a 7" record and as a digital download on November 21, 2006, on the Secretly Canadian label.

==== Track listing ====
Track #	Track name
01	"Jacket"
02	"Murder In Michigan (Acoustic)"

=== The Moonstation House Band ===
His first full-length album, The Moonstation House Band, was released as both a CD and LP on the Secretly Canadian Label in January, 2007. From this, he launched a six-week tour.

==== Track listing ====
Track #	Track name
01	"Nothin' No"
02	"Jacket"
03	"Feet of a Liar"
04	"Corduroy Blues"
05	"Wisdom From a Tree"
06	"Can't See Your Face No More"
07	"Murder in Michigan"
08	"Moonlight Instrumental"

=== Waiting for the Sunrise ===
His second full-length album was released on August 5, 2008. It was released on the Secretly Canadian label.

==== Track listing ====
Track #	Track name
01	"I Will Be Fine"
02	"California Breezes"
03	"Hit the Road"
04	"Old Turns"
05	"Someone Like You"
06	"Knowledge of Evil"
07	"Cryin' Like the Rain"
08	"Need for Now"
09	"Lyin' in Bed"
10	"Waiting for the Sunrise"

== Touring ==
Vandervelde toured the United States in March and April 2007 as a tour release for his first album, The Moonstation House Band, along with Secretly Canadian Performing Artist, Richard Swift.

He played Lollapalooza in Chicago in 2007, and the FuckYeah Festival in Los Angeles in 2008.

He has been touring the US and worldwide, playing with Father John Misty. In 2016, Vandervelde opened Father John Misty shows in the US as one half of the duo Tess & Dave.

== Mastering ==
He helped mix and master a limited edition release on Joyful Noise with Tim Kinsella. The project was called "Tim Kinsella Sings the Songs of Marvin Tate by Leroy Bach featuring Angel Olsen". The album was mixed in Leroy Bach's home studio in Humboldt Park, Chicago and was limited to 1000 copies on splatter vinyl.
