= Wild Honey Never Stolen / Borne Away on a Black Barge =

Single by J. Tillman
- Released: 2009
- Recorded: 2009
- Genre: Folk
- Label: Western Vinyl
- Songwriter(s): Josh Tillman (both songs)
- Producer(s): Kory Kruckenberg

J. Tillman singles chronology
"Wild Honey Never Stolen / Borne Away on a Black Barge" (2009)	"Hollywood Forever Cemetery Sings / Drive 7"" (2014)

"Wild Honey Never Stolen / Borne Away on a Black Barge" is a single by J. Tillman, and was released via Western Vinyl on 70 gram vinyl. It was the following release to the Year in the Kingdom album. Bill Patton was featured on ukulele and bass voice. The label writes the following about the two tracks: "These two tiny songs [...] are little stories about a post-apocalypse landscape and a reworking of the last stand of King Arthur, respectively. Both were meant to be more or less sing-alongs, the idea of including lyrics and sheet music was considered, but it was ultimately decided that that would be pretentious and weird."

The artist responsible for the original cover artwork is Toby Liebowitz.

== Track listing ==
1. "Wild Honey Never Stolen"
2. "Borne Away on a Black Barge"
