= Please Don't Die =

Please Don't Die may refer to:

- "Please Don't Die", a 2018 song by Father John Misty from God's Favorite Customer
- "Please Don't Die", a 2005 song by Robbie Williams from Intensive Care
