= Joe Roberts (artist) =

American artist

- Born: 1976 (age 49–50); Madison, Wisconsin, U.S.
- Education: San Francisco Art Institute
- Website: https://www.lsdworldpeace.com/

Joseph Fidel Roberts (born 1976), also known under the moniker LSDworldpeace, is an American artist.

Roberts was born in Madison, Wisconsin, and grew up in Milwaukee. He was introduced to art through his grandfather Steve Vasy, who was an artist, and through his father, a librarian and comic book collector, who would show him the books of Ram Dass, Jack Kirby, and R. Crumb.

In 1997, Roberts moved to Los Gatos, California. Soon after, he moved to San Francisco, where he studied for a semester at the San Francisco Art Institute on a scholarship from the Oneida Nation of Wisconsin, of which he is an enrolled tribal member. Despite this, Roberts maintains he mainly learned about art through psychedelics rather than through formal training.

His work often features motifs like Mickey Mouse, the Grateful Dead stealie, and the Teenage Mutant Ninja Turtles. He takes inspiration from Mike Kelley, impressionists like Van Gogh, as well as from graffiti culture, and artists like Barry McGee and Chris Johansen.

Roberts has gained attention for his collaborations with skate brands like Supreme, GX1000, and Civilist. His art has been displayed in galleries across the United States and Europe. In 2017, Roberts was featured on a VICE documentary about DMT presented by Hamilton Morris. In 2024, Roberts' art was featured on the album cover of "Mahashmashana" by Father John Misty.

Roberts currently resides in San Francisco.

== Publications ==
- LSD Worldpeace (2014)
- We Ate The Acid (61)A3HT3TA3W) (2018)
- Clowns of Hyperspace (2021)
