= Chloë and the Next 20th Century =

Studio album by Father John Misty
- Released: April 8, 2022
- Recorded: August–December 2020
- Genres: Folk; jazz; swing
- Length: 50:37
- Labels: Sub Pop; Bella Union
- Producers: Josh Tillman; Jonathan Wilson

Father John Misty chronology
| Anthem +3 (2020) | Chloë and the Next 20th Century (2022) | Greatish Hits: I Followed My Dreams and My Dreams Said to Crawl (2024) |

Singles from Chloë and the Next 20th Century
- 1. "Funny Girl" Released: January 4, 2022; 2. "Q4" Released: February 9, 2022; 3. "Goodbye Mr. Blue" Released: March 9, 2022; 4. "The Next 20th Century" Released: April 4, 2022

Chloë and the Next 20th Century is the fifth studio album by American musician Josh Tillman under the stage name Father John Misty, released through Sub Pop and Bella Union on April 8, 2022. The album was co-produced by Tillman and longtime collaborator Jonathan Wilson, and was preceded by the singles, "Funny Girl", "Q4", "Goodbye Mr. Blue" and "The Next 20th Century".

Written and recorded throughout the COVID-19 pandemic in 2020, the album marks a departure from Misty's folk rock and indie rock sound, drawing sonic inspiration from big band, jazz standards, and traditional pop music, while featuring narrative, short story-based lyrics.

== Background and recording ==
Chloë and the Next 20th Century is Father John Misty's fifth studio album and his first full-length project since the release of God's Favorite Customer in 2018. He began writing the album in spring 2020. It was recorded between August and December 2020. He entered the studio in August having written "Kiss Me (I Loved You)", "We Could Be Strangers", "Buddy's Rendezvous" and "The Next 20th Century". Following that session, Tillman mostly conceived what the album would be and wrote the rest of the songs before recording resumed in October 2020.

It was co-produced by Tillman and longtime collaborator Jonathan Wilson. This was the first record Tillman had recorded at Wilson's new Fivestar Studios located in the hills of Topanga, California above LA. The two first recorded "basic tracks" at Fivestar Studios, whereas strings, brass, and woodwinds were recorded in a session at United Recordings which featured numerous musicians, including trumpeter Wayne Bergeron and saxophonist Dan Higgins. The album was engineered and mixed by Dave Cerminara and features arrangements by Drew Erickson.

== Music ==
Chloë and the Next 20th Century draws sonic inspiration from big band, jazz standards, and traditional pop. It has been compared to Randy Newman's Sail Away (1972) and Harry Nilsson's A Little Touch of Schmilsson in the Night (1973). The album is distinguished by its cinematic quality, with Mojo calling it as a "Hollywood album moving from the '30s through to the '60s and melding those influences to create an imagined version of the past." This Old Hollywood influence is evident in the brass arrangements and string sections on tracks such as "Funny Girl", the "booming" instrumentation of "Q4" which has been compared to the film music of composer John Barry, and "Goodbye Mr. Blue", which has been called an homage to Nilsson's song "Everybody's Talkin'" which served as the theme to the 1969 film Midnight Cowboy.

Critics have commented on the album's more "hopeful" tone compared to previous outings, with Tillman indulging in a nostalgia for an earlier F. Scott Fitzgerald era heavily steeped in excess and wealth, instead of the mortality of God's Favorite Customer or societal annihilation of Pure Comedy. A nod to the style of earlier albums comes through on the album's last (and longest) track, "The Next 20th Century", an anachronistic modern prog tune which meanders over a low-key bossa nova beat and has been described as "seven minutes of phantasmagorical imagery" and a "moody, hallucinatory dirge". The song references dark corners of human history, Nazis, Jesus Christ and the faded celebrity of Batman-era Val Kilmer amongst other things. In the song, the glitzy showbiz and glamorous 20s Hollywood façade fades away as Tillman muses over apocalyptic concerns and the fear that we may be living through an extension of the last hundred years instead of a new century. The song ends with Tillman admitting he would prefer to keep the love songs if he can give the future in exchange. The brooding closing track, with its squalls of electric guitar, has been observed as the most traditional Father John Misty track on the album.

== Release ==
In December 2021, a spoken-word vinyl was mailed to fans by Bella Union. It announced Father John Misty's fifth studio album, Chloë and the Next 20th Century, scheduled for release on April 8, 2022, by Sub Pop and Bella Union. It would feature eleven new tracks produced by Tillman and Jonathan Wilson. The album and its track listing were officially revealed on January 5, 2022. The album's lead single "Funny Girl" was released the same day, accompanied by a music video by Nicholas Ashe Bateman. Three additional singles – "Q4", "Goodbye Mr. Blue", and "The Next 20th Century" – were released on February 9, March 9, and April 4 of that same year respectively. On April 8, 2022, the album was released worldwide through Sub Pop and in Europe through Bella Union on vinyl, CD, cassette, and streaming. A limited deluxe edition box set of the album was released in the form of a hardcover book, which features both clear red LPs, a poster, and two bonus 7" singles: a cover by Lana Del Rey of the album track "Buddy's Rendezvous" and a cover by Jack Cruz (Note: Jack Cruz is the "singing monkey" voiced by director David Lynch, originally appearing in Lynch's short film What Did Jack Do? (2017).) of "Kiss Me (I Loved You)".

Father John Misty promoted the album with two symphony concerts, one at Los Angeles' Walt Disney Concert Hall on February 25, 2022, with the Los Angeles Philharmonic; and the other at London's Barbican Centre on April 7, 2022, with Britten Sinfonia conducted by Jules Buckley.

== Critical reception ==
Professional ratings
Aggregate scores
| Source | Rating |
|---|---|
| AnyDecentMusic? | 7.7/10 |
| Metacritic | 82/100 |
Review scores
| Source | Rating |
| AllMusic | 4/5 stars |
| The A.V. Club | B+ |
| DIY | 4.5/5 stars |
| Entertainment Weekly | B+ |
| The Guardian | 4/5 stars |
| Mojo | 4/5 stars |
| NME | 5/5 stars |
| Pitchfork | 7.9/10 |
| Rolling Stone | 3.5/5 stars |
| Uncut | 8/10 |

Chloë and the Next 20th Century was met with critical acclaim upon release. At Metacritic, which assigns a normalized rating out of 100 to reviews from professional publications, the album received an average score of 82, based on 25 reviews. Aggregator AnyDecentMusic? gave it 7.7 out of 10, based on their assessment of the critical consensus.

Alexis Petridis of The Guardian wrote, "Tillman's songwriting is portable, capable of transcending its era ... Its tracks are more than knowing facsimiles of vintage styles because they're uniformly melodically stunning – listen to the chorus of "We Could Be Strangers", or the close-miked sigh of "Kiss Me (I Loved You)". Tillman's voice sounds fantastic throughout: restrained and bruised." Peter Watts of Uncut gave the album an 8 out of 10, writing, "The Next 20th Century contains a bunch of songs – "Goodbye Mr Blue", "We Could Be Strangers", "Buddy's Rendezvous" – that go right to the gut with their instant melodic charm, and a bunch more – "Kiss Me (I Loved You)", "Q4", "Only A Fool", "The Next 20th Century" – that are deeply striking a few listens later thanks to their sumptuous arrangements, exceptional playing and emotional pull." Leah Greenblatt of Entertainment Weekly praised the album's lyrics as "pure picaresque, so full of eccentric characters and casual Hollywood lore they feel less like songs than Paul Thomas Anderson movies compressed to six minutes or less."

In a less favorable review, Charles Lyons-Burt of Slant Magazine found the album's "midcentury Broadway" instrumentation to be "sluggish and overly swooning" and wrote that it "doesn't possess the observational heft of 2017's Pure Comedy, a post-apocalyptic survey of America's anxieties and lamentable cultural habits. Rather, the narratives and wordplay found on Chloë and the Next 20th Century, while at times evocative given Tillman's way with language, are comparatively toothless and too clever by half."

In Ireland, the album was chosen by RTÉ Radio 1 as their album of the week on 15 April 2022.

== Track listing ==
All tracks are written by Josh Tillman.

Chloë and the Next 20th Century track listing
| No. | Title | Length |
|---|---|---|
| 1. | "Chloë" | 3:28 |
| 2. | "Goodbye Mr. Blue" | 5:00 |
| 3. | "Kiss Me (I Loved You)" | 3:57 |
| 4. | "(Everything But) Her Love" | 4:16 |
| 5. | "Buddy's Rendezvous" | 5:00 |
| 6. | "Q4" | 4:58 |
| 7. | "Olvidado (Otro Momento)" | 4:48 |
| 8. | "Funny Girl" | 3:39 |
| 9. | "Only a Fool" | 4:03 |
| 10. | "We Could Be Strangers" | 4:32 |
| 11. | "The Next 20th Century" | 6:56 |
| Total length: | | 50:37 |

Deluxe edition bonus 7"
| No. | Title | Length |
|---|---|---|
| 1. | "Kiss Me (I Loved You)" (Jack Cruz cover) | 3:59 |
| 2. | "Kiss Me (I Loved You)" (alternate version) | 3:40 |

Deluxe edition bonus 7"
| No. | Title | Length |
|---|---|---|
| 1. | "Buddy's Rendezvous" (Lana Del Rey cover) | 4:59 |
| 2. | "Chloë" (instrumental version) | 3:30 |

== Personnel ==
Musicians

- Josh Tillman – performance
- Jonathan Wilson – performance
- Drew Erickson – performance, arrangements
- Nona Quartet
  - Andrew Bulbrook – violin
  - Wynton Grant – violin
  - Zach Dellinger – viola
  - Jake Braun – cello
- Dan Higgins – flute, clarinet, saxophone, additional arrangements
- Steve Holtman – trombone, bass trombone
- Wayne Bergeron – trumpet
- Greg Huckins – flute, clarinet
- Chad Smith – bassoon
- John Yoakum – oboe, clarinet
- Mark Hollingsworth – flute, clarinet
- Grant Milliken – vibraphone (tracks 1, 3, 5, 8)
- Jason Crosby – fiddle (track 9)
- Davey Chegwidden – congas, bongos, percussion (tracks 1, 8)
- Cristina Black – harp (track 8)
- Chris Darley – guitar (track 6)

Technical

- Josh Tillman – production
- Jonathan Wilson – production
- Dave Cerminara – engineering, mixing, additional production
- Drew Erickson – additional production

Artwork

- Lauren Ward – photography
- Alex Kweskin – photography
- Steve Moulton – darkroom printing, comping
- Alia Penner – costume design, collage
- Payton Morse – model
- Sasha Barr – layout, design
- Josh Tillman – concept, art direction
- Kelci Tillman – illustration

== Charts ==
Chart performance for Chloë and the Next 20th Century
| Chart (2022) | Peak position |
|---|---|
| Australian Albums (ARIA) | 63 |
| Belgian Albums (Ultratop Flanders) | 47 |
| Belgian Albums (Ultratop Wallonia) | 187 |
| Canadian Albums (Billboard) | 98 |
| Dutch Albums (Album Top 100) | 55 |
| German Albums (Offizielle Top 100) | 46 |
| Irish Albums (Official Charts) | 47 |
| Scottish Albums (Official Charts) | 3 |
| Swiss Albums (Schweizer Hitparade) | 47 |
| UK Albums (Official Charts) | 2 |
| UK Independent Albums (Official Charts) | 2 |
| US Billboard 200 | 28 |
| US Top Alternative Albums (Billboard) | 6 |
| US Top Rock Albums (Billboard) | 6 |
