= Minor Works =

Studio album by J. Tillman
- Released: November 6, 2006
- Recorded: 2006
- Genre: Folk
- Length: 41:57
- Label: Fargo Records
- Producer: Kory Kruckenberg, Troy Glessner

J. Tillman chronology
Long May You Run, J. Tillman (2006)	Minor Works (2006)	Cancer and Delirium (2007)

Minor Works is the first album by J. Tillman released on an official label: Fargo Records. It was completed after three limited CDr albums (Untitled No. 1, I Will Return and Long May You Run, J. Tillman) and a tour EP (Documented).

J. Tillman said about the album: "This album is pretty different from anything I've done before. For instance, it's the first time that I've used a drum kit... And then, before, I mainly wrote blues numbers or murder ballads. My new songs took almost a year to mature, which was how long it took me to complete the recording."

Tillman also said, in an interview for SCTAS, that "'Minor Works' was conceived in a very complete way; I had the majority of the arrangements and instrumentation mapped out way ahead of time. I knew I wanted to take a stab at making a studio record. One of the main focal points was that I knew I wanted drums. The album was kind of a writing exercise for me, as in "I know I can write ballads, what would it sound like if I tried to write rock songs?" And obviously, they did not turn out to be rock songs. So, in some respects, that record is kind of a failed experiment."

== Track listing ==
No.	Title	Length
1.	"Darling Night"	5:09
2.	"Jesse's Not a Sleeper"	4:02
3.	"Crooked Roof"	4:36
4.	"With Wolves"	4:05
5.	"Minor Works"	4:52
6.	"For an Hour with You"	5:00
7.	"Take Care"	3:49
8.	"Restlessness"	5:06
9.	"Now You're Among Strangers"	5:18
Total length:		41:57
