= Isle Land =

Extended play by J. Tillman

EP by J. Tillman
- Released: December 5, 2008
- Recorded: 2008
- Genre: Folk
- Label: Bella Union
- Producer: Kory Kruckenberg, Sean Pecknold

J. Tillman chronology
Documented (2006)	Isle Land (2008)	Laminar Excursion Monthly #8 (Procession at Night) (2010)

Isle Land is a DVD EP recorded and filmed on Vashon Island. It was released by Bella Union.

== Track listing ==
1. "Vacilando Territory"
2. "Vessels"
3. "Barter Blues"
4. "No Occasion"
