= Drew Erickson =

American record producer

Drew Erickson is an American record producer, songwriter, composer, and arranger. He is known for co-writing and producing for artists such as Lana Del Rey and Father John Misty, as well as for his work on recordings by Mitski, Angel Olsen, and Weyes Blood. He has received two Grammy nominations, including a nomination for Album of the Year for Del Rey's album, Did You Know That There's a Tunnel Under Ocean Blvd.

== Selected discography ==
- Stove - Lana Del Rey (2026) - Producer, arranger
- Beneath the Lilypad - Alexandra Savior (2025) - Producer (all tracks), performer, co-writer (#1, 3, 4, 6)
- Mahashmashana – Father John Misty (2024) – Producer, arranger, performer, co-writer
- The Land Is Inhospitable and So Are We – Mitski (2023) – Arranger, conductor (#1, 3, 6, 7, 9, 10)
- Forever Means (EP) - Angel Olsen (2023) - Arranger, conductor (all tracks); organ, piano (#1, 3); keyboards (#2), synthesizer (#3)
- Did You Know That There's a Tunnel Under Ocean Blvd – Lana Del Rey (2023) – Producer, arranger, performer (#1, 2, 3, 9, 12), co-writer (#3, 12)
- Watercolor Eyes (single) – Lana Del Rey (2022) – Producer, performer
- Big Time – Angel Olsen (2022) – Arranger, conductor, performer
- And in the Darkness, Hearts Aglow – Weyes Blood (2022) – Arranger, conductor (#1, 2, 3, 5), performer (#1, 2, 3, 5)
- Chloë and the Next 20th Century – Father John Misty (2022) – Arranger, conductor, performer, additional production, co-writer (#5)
- Blue Banisters – Lana Del Rey (2021) – Producer, arranger, performer (#3, 6, 7, 8, 15), co-writer (#3, 6, 7, 8)
- Fear of Death – Tim Heidecker (2020) – Producer, performer
- Titanic Rising – Weyes Blood (2019) – Arranger, conductor (#2, 3, 4, 6, 7, 8, 9), performer

== Personal life ==
Erickson has been in a relationship with artist Alexandra Savior since June 2019.
