= Jeffertitti's Nile =

American psychedelic rock band

- Genres: Psychedelic rock, neo-psychedelia
- Years active: 2009-present
- Labels: Beyond Beyond Is Beyond, Lolipop Records
- Members: Jeff Ramuno; Iggy Star-Child; Michelle Villiers; Modeste Cobián
- Website: jeffertittisnile.com

Jeffertitti's Nile is an American psychedelic rock band from Los Angeles, California.

== History ==
Jeffertitti's Nile is the project of Jeff Ramuno, former bassist for Father John Misty. Ramuno self-released two albums in 2009 and 2010, and for his 2014 release, The Electric Hour, he recorded directly to analog tape and worked with several guest musicians, including Father John Misty (J. Tillman) & Jonny Bell of Crystal Antlers. The album was released in April 2014 on Brooklyn label Beyond Beyond Is Beyond. The album includes a cover of Bessie Smith's "Blue Spirit Blues". Following the release of the album, Jeffertitti's Nile toured the US with Father John Misty.

== Discography ==
- Jeffertitti's Nile (2009)
- Hypnotic River of Sound (2010)
- Midnight Siren (single) (2011)
- Upside (single) (2012)
- The Electric Hour (2014)
- The Entire Universe (2020)
- NON GENRÉ (2020)
