= Real Love Baby =

2016 song by indie rock artist Father John Misty

Single by Father John Misty
- Released: July 26, 2016
- Studio: The Diamond Mine, New York City
- Genre: Indie rock; folk rock; soft rock
- Length: 3:09
- Label: Sub Pop
- Songwriter: Josh Tillman
- Producers: Josh Tillman; Thomas Brenneck

Father John Misty singles chronology
| "The Angry River" (2015) | "Real Love Baby" (2016) | "Pure Comedy" (2017) |

"Real Love Baby" is a song by American folk musician Josh Tillman under his pseudonym Father John Misty. It was released on July 26, 2016, as a standalone single through Sub Pop Records. The song was originally written by Tillman for Lady Gaga, but he became enamored with it and ended up keeping it for himself. It was recorded and produced with Thomas Brenneck, known for his work with the Budos Band, at The Diamond Mine in New York. "Real Love Baby" has been characterized as an indie rock, folk rock, and soft rock song. A limited 2000 copies vinyl, was released on July 26, 2023, seven years after its original release.

Music critics praised the song, highlighting its lyrical honesty and sweetness. "Real Love Baby" debuted at number 30 on Billboard's Adult Alternative Airplay and peaked at number 3 on the UK Physical Singles Chart. In October 2026, it was certified double platinum in the US, making it Tillman's best-selling track. Eight years after its release, a music video for the song, directed by Eggs Tyrone, was released on Valentine's Day.

== Background ==
Tillman wrote and recorded the song while working on a session for Lady Gaga. After developing the song, he felt too fond of it to depart with it. In an interview with Zane Lowe, he recalled, "We were hanging. It was, like, 5 in the morning, someone handing me an acoustic guitar and I'm just like, 'What are hands.' We had so much fun. Mark [Ronson] —just watching him produce, it was amazing." To Q, he said: "I wrote 'Real Love Baby' with Lady Gaga in mind and ended up writing one of my most vulnerable songs. Writing for other people is the best way to trick yourself into writing for yourself in some unexpected way that isn’t attached to your vanity."

== Music video ==
A music video for the song was released on Valentine's Day in 2024, eight years after its release. It was directed by Eggs Tyrone and cycles through clips from TikTok of people dancing to the song.

== Release ==
An unmastered version of "Real Love Baby" was initially released with little fanfare on Tillman's SoundCloud page on May 19, 2016. Tillman tweeted that "RLB is not on the record, it's just a thing [...] Have a good summer." It was officially released through Sub Pop in July. Overseas distribution was handled by Bella Union, which distributed their own 7" single. The song was used for a 2017 Discover LA tourism campaign. The single was re-released on July 26, 2023, seven years after its original release.

The song peaked at number 30 on Billboard's Adult Alternative Airplay ranking. "Real Love Baby" did not enter the UK Singles Chart, but peaked at number 3 on the UK Physical Singles Chart.

== Reception ==
Andy Beta at Pitchfork awarded the song its "Best New Track" designation, commenting: "There's a humbleness and honesty to the song. Like any real love, it's about learning to surrender such power to the other person." Tom Breihan at Stereogum was complimentary of the song, noting, "'Real Love Baby' is an effortlessly smooth ’70s-pop choogle, a song that's either a parody of yacht rock or an entirely respectable stab at doing a straight-up yacht rock song." An uncredited writer for Rolling Stone highlighted the tune: "The achingly lovely "Real Love Baby" might be his prettiest song, and it's definitely his sweetest." Patrick Ryan from USA Today ranked it among the 10 best songs of its year, observing: "Equal parts schmaltzy and sincere, it's a folk-rock rumination on love that's bound to be a hipster wedding staple for years to come."

== Credits and personnel ==
Credits adapted from the liner notes of the 7" single.

- J. Tillman – lead vocals, backing vocals, acoustic guitar, drums, percussion, handclaps
- Thomas Brenneck – electric guitar, electric bass, synthesizer, handclaps
- Mark Ronson – handclaps
- Jens Jungkurth – recording, mixing
- Abby Echiverri – assistant engineer
- Catalina Velásquez – artwork

== Certifications ==
| Region | Certification | Certified units/sales |
|---|---|---|
| New Zealand (RMNZ) | 2× Platinum | 60,000^{‡} |
| United States (RIAA) | 2× Platinum | 2,000,000^{‡} |
^{‡} Sales+streaming figures based on certification alone.
