= Mahashmashana =

Studio album by Father John Misty
- Released: November 22, 2024
- Recorded: Five Star, Los Angeles; East/West, Los Angeles; United Recording, Los Angeles; Drew Erickson's house
- Genres: Art pop; baroque pop; orchestral pop
- Length: 50:21
- Labels: Bella Union; Sub Pop
- Producers: Drew Erickson; Josh Tillman; Jonathan Wilson

Father John Misty chronology
Greatish Hits: I Followed My Dreams and My Dreams Said to Crawl (2024)	Mahashmashana (2024)

Singles from Mahashmashana
- 1. "I Guess Time Just Makes Fools of Us All" Released: July 31, 2024; 2. "Screamland" Released: September 17, 2024; 3. "She Cleans Up" Released: October 15, 2024; 4. "Josh Tillman and the Accidental Dose" Released: November 22, 2024

Mahashmashana is the sixth studio album by American musician Josh Tillman under the stage name Father John Misty, released through Sub Pop and Bella Union on November 22, 2024. The album was produced in Los Angeles by Tillman and Drew Erickson with frequent collaborator Jonathan Wilson acting as executive producer.

The album artwork was designed by artist Joe Roberts. Its title refers to the Sanskrit word Mahāśmaśāna (महाश्मशान), meaning "great cremation ground". The album was preceded by the singles, "I Guess Time Makes Fools of Us All", "She Cleans Up", "Screamland" and "Josh Tillman and the Accidental Dose".

"I Guess Time Makes Fools of Us All" was originally included on Tillman's greatest hits album, Greatish Hits: I Followed My Dreams and My Dreams Said to Crawl (2024), released four months earlier. The second single, "Screamland", featuring Alan Sparhawk on guitar, was released on September 17, 2024.

== Composition ==
"I'll end up writing these huge, unstructured things, pages and pages, almost like an epic poem. From that I'll get, say, three interminable songs. And downstream from that, I start strip-mining those three songs for parts to use in other songs. It seems chaotic, and really unfocused, but there's an internal logic to it".

— Tillman on his writing process.

Tillman said his writing process looked "way different now than it did 15 years ago". The first iteration of "I Guess Time Just Makes Fools of Us All" was "just three verses and one chorus" but Tillman kept adding material to it, one of the additional lines he wrote, references an instance in 2018, where he turned down to appear on the cover of musical magazine Rolling Stone and they told him he was the least famous person to reject the offer.

He compared the theme of the album to its predecessor, Chloë and the Next 20th Century, claiming it was "an experiment in seeing what happens when I erase myself from my work" and Mahashmashana "is definitely work about erasing myself".

Members of the Swedish post-punk band Viagra Boys receive a co-writing credit on "She Cleans Up", with Tillman taking inspiration from their 2022 song, "Punk Rock Loser".

== Recording ==
Mahashmashana is the first Father John Misty studio album to feature the full participation of Tillman's longtime backing band: guitarists Chris Dixie Darley and David Vandervelde; bass guitarist Eli Thomson; pianists and keyboardists Kyle Flynn and Jon Titterington; and drummer Dan Bailey. Regarding their involvement, Tillman stated: "This time around, I wanted to get the band in there and see what happened."

Tillman praised drummer Dan Bailey's playing, noting: "For my money, I would put [Dan] up against Joey Waronker, Matt Chamberlain or any of those guys, so it's just sort of criminal not to use him in the studio." Tillman described Bailey's drum breaks on "I Guess Time Just Makes Fools of Us All" as sounding like "noodles with olive oil, garlic and truffle."

== Title and artwork ==
The title refers to the Sanskrit word Mahāśmaśāna (महाश्मशान), meaning "great cremation ground". Tillman chose the word after reading it in Bruce Wagner's 2006 novel Memorial and feeling inspired by it, "Just visually, it has all these sha-na-nas and ha-ha-has in it. With the record, there’s a lot in there about the self and about identity, and I think just the micro and the macro scale of endings." Tillman commissioned artist Joe Roberts to do some collages for the album, he also sent along a few doodles. One of them was made while Roberts was listening to the record, Tillman thought they looked like biblical angels, and chose it as the cover. Roberts almost did not send the drawing due to an accidental "red splotch" of paint.

== Critical reception ==
Professional ratings
Aggregate scores
Source	Rating
AnyDecentMusic?	8.3/10
Metacritic	86/100
Review scores
Source	Rating
AllMusic	4.5/5 stars
DIY	4.5/5 stars
The Guardian	4/5 stars
Mojo	4/5 stars
NME	4/5 stars
Paste	8.4/10
Pitchfork	8.3/10
Record Collector	4/5 stars
Rolling Stone	3.5/5 stars
Uncut	8/10

Mahashmashana has received critical acclaim from music critics. At Metacritic, which assigns a normalised rating out of 100 to reviews from mainstream publications, the album received an average score of 86, based on 22 reviews, which indicates "universal acclaim". Aggregator AnyDecentMusic? gave it 8.3 out of 10, based on their assessment of the critical consensus.

Tom Doyle of Mojo said that by the end of the album the listener leaves Misty "with another great, mind-bending, soul-baring, melodically rich album to his name: a singer tap dancing on the very edge". Peter Watts of Uncut praised his vocal performance, "Tillman is an outstanding vocalist, a master of phrasing and inflection, noting the songs "Mahashmashana", "She Cleans Up", "Mental Health" and closing track "Summer’s Gone", as examples. Watts also pointed out that Tillman's skill as a musician "gets overshadowed by his lyrical brilliance". For Record Collector Kevin Harley said that on the album, Tillman "addresses mortality with wickedly expansive style", and described Mahashmashana as "seductively fertile" and "lyrically frisky". Writing for No Depression, John Amen noted that throughout the album, "Tillman plays both Hamlet and his jester, a philosopher and satirist, a doomsdayer and Zen poet ... reaffirming his status as a distinct stylist". On the themes of the album, Alexis Petridis of The Guardian opined that the album "ticks all the boxes" of what could be expected from listening to his previous records, adding, "Indeed, you're sometimes struck by the sense that Tillman is saying things that plenty of other artists have already said, but putting it noticeably better than they have". Nevertheless, NME Jordan Bassett considered the album, "finds Misty liberated from the obsession with contemporary pop culture", he showed throughout his discography.

In an overwhelmingly positive review Kieron Tyler of The Arts Desk praised Mahashmashana: "Whoever it is – Father John Misty or Josh Tillman – has fashioned a landmark album, one flawlessly uniting style and substance". In the same vein, Clash's Emma Harrison awarded the record 9 out of 10 describing the album as "assured, emotive and luminous" and that Mahashmashana made for a "moving and captivating experience that is set to become a firm favourite for both new fans and the existing congregation that worship at the altar of Father John Misty". Stereogum named Mahashmashana as their Album of the Week and in a positive review, writer Chris DeVille noted Tillman's growth as a songwriter; claiming the album would become a fan favourite as "It’s among his absolute best". Likewise, Pitchfork named the record Best New Music, with reviewer Anna Gaca claiming his songwriting "might be the best it’s ever been".

Oliver Crook of Exclaim! was less celebratory and felt the album did not explore new ground for Tillman, but rather "a maturing and mashing together" of his previous work, which held the album "back from true greatness". Similarly, writing for Slant Magazine, Jeremy Winograd thought the lack of "thematic clarity" notwithstanding, Mahashmashana, "still feels like a return to form".

== Track listing ==
All lyrics are written by Josh Tillman.

Mahashmashana track listing
No.	Title	Music	Length
1.	"Mahashmashana"	J. Tillman	9:19
2.	"She Cleans Up"	J. Tillman; Oskar Carls; Pelle Gunnerfeldt; Linus Hillborg; Henrik Höckert; Elias Jungqvist; Sebastian Murphy; Tor Sjödén	4:26
3.	"Josh Tillman and the Accidental Dose"	J. Tillman	5:12
4.	"Mental Health"	J. Tillman; Drew Erickson	6:28
5.	"Screamland"	J. Tillman	6:51
6.	"Being You"	J. Tillman; Zach Tillman; David Vandervelde	5:13
7.	"I Guess Time Just Makes Fools of Us All"	J. Tillman	8:35
8.	"Summer's Gone"	J. Tillman; Erickson	4:17
Total length:			50:21

== Personnel ==
=== Musicians ===
- Josh Tillman – vocals, performance
- Drew Erickson – performance
- Jonathan Wilson – performance
- Dan Bailey – performance
- Eli Thomson – performance
- David Vandervelde – performance
- Chris Dixie Darley – performance
- Jon Titterington – performance
- Kyle Flynn – performance
- Fletcher Sheridan – choir, choral conductor
- Suzanne Waters – choir (all tracks), soprano solo (track 4)
- Kathryn Shuman – choir
- Kim Dawson – choir
- Ann Sheridan – choir
- Valerie Tambaoan – choir
- Laura Flores Jackman – choir
- Adam Faruqi – choir
- Jarrett Johnson – choir
- David Loucks – choir
- Matthew Lewis – choir
- Will Goldman – choir
- The Nona Quartet
  - Andrew Bulbrook – violin
  - Wynton Grant – violin
  - Zach Dillinger – viola
  - Jacob Braun – cello (tracks 1, 4, 8)
  - Christine Kim – cello (tracks 3, 5–7)
- Dan Higgins – saxophone (tracks 1, 4), flute (4)
- Logan Hone – saxophone (track 2)
- Wayne Bergeron – trumpet (tracks 4, 7)
- Steve Holtman – trombone (tracks 4, 7)
- Danielle Ondarza – French horn (tracks 4, 7)
- Connor "Catfish" Gallaher – pedal steel (track 4)
- Benji – guitar (track 4)
- Alan Sparhawk – guitar (track 5)
- Jacob Scesney – saxophone (track 6)
- Tony Barba – saxophone (track 7)
- Mark Hollingsworth – clarinet, flute (track 8)

=== Production ===
- Josh Tillman – production (all tracks), mixing (tracks 1, 2, 4, 6–8)
- Drew Erickson – producer (all tracks), arranger (all tracks)
- Jonathan Wilson – executive production (all tracks), additional mixing (tracks 1, 2, 4, 6–8)
- Michael Harris – additional production, engineering (all tracks); mixing (tracks 1, 2, 4, 6–8)
- BJ Burton – additional production (track 5), mixing (3, 5)
- Grant Milliken – additional engineering
- Sean Cook – additional engineering
- Gabe Veltri – additional engineering
- Jacob Kell – additional engineering
- Franky Fox – additional engineering
- Logan Taylor – additional engineering
- Scott Moore – additional engineering
- Sam Plecker – additional engineering
- Dan Bailey – additional engineering

=== Artwork ===
- Josh Tillman – art direction
- Jeff Kleinsmith – art direction, design
- Joe Roberts – artwork
- Alex Kweskin – back cover photo
- Evan Laffer – liner notes

== Charts ==
Chart performance for Mahashmashana
Chart (2024)	Peak position
Scottish Albums (Official Charts)	3
UK Albums (Official Charts)	12
UK Independent Albums (Official Charts)	1
US Billboard 200	161
US Independent Albums (Billboard)	25
US Top Rock & Alternative Albums (Billboard)	32
