= Alia Penner =

American artist (b. 1985–86)

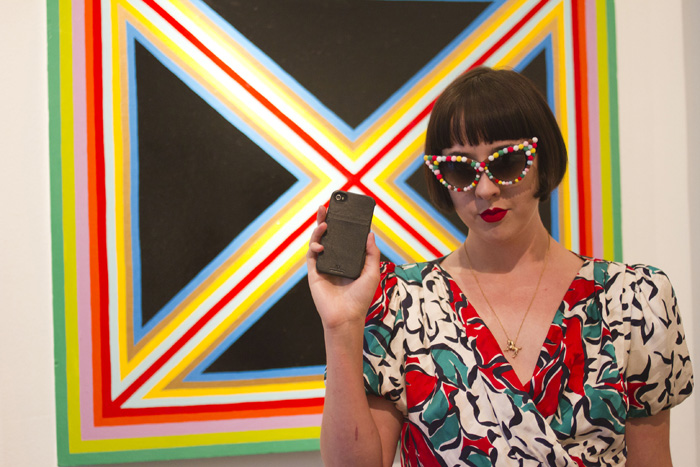
- Penner in front of a painting.
- Born: 1985 or 1986 (age 40–41); Los Angeles, California, U.S.
- Other name: Alia Pop
- Occupation: Pop artist

Alia Penner is a Los Angeles-based artist, whose work is predominantly modern pop art, and film curator.

== Early life ==
Penner grew up in Topanga Canyon. Her father is a 3D cinematographer, and Penner says that she always wanted to be an artist, attending art school for university and working in various forms of art.

== Art style ==
Penner works in traditional mediums as well as others, experimenting with found objects and working in film and fashion. She has collaborated with Anna Sui, Colette, Warby Parker, Rowan Blanchard and Tiffany & Co. Her studio is at her home in LA.

She takes influence from art of the 1960s and 70s, enjoying working with lots of color and psychedelic images; she says that there is also a range of styles from these decades to draw from, as well as styles from other periods that inspire her, including Art Nouveau and Art Deco. She has also said that books and movies inspire her; she collects books, works as a film curator and Cinefamily, and "[immerses] herself in pop-culture history".

Her style has been described as "Busby Berkeley-meets-Peter Max collage style" with "signature 'rainbow portal paintings'". Penner describes discovering her style as a "a process", evolving through different collaborations with artistic friends and working in illustration, fashion design, and film.

== Works ==
In 2013, Penner decorated Katy Perry's piano and created a backdrop for Father John Misty at Coachella. In 2014 she directed a music video where she also styled the star, Jena Malone. That year, she said Perry's piano and Malone's video had been her favorite projects, especially the piano because: "it’s this object that you know is gonna be around forever. It's covered in red roses and ice cream colors. It was great to work on it over the course of a couple months. I feel like everything has to happen so fast nowadays, so to be able to even spend time painting something is just a pleasure. I wouldn’t mind doing that all the time."

Also in 2014, Penner worked with Brie Larson to co-found Women of Cinefamily at the non-profit Cinefamily, a program highlighting films directed by and starring women. Penner had been involved with Cinefamily for a while before starting the sub-group. She made her directorial debut with the short film PopWrap in 2014, about the Andy Warhol-inspired fashion designed by Diane von Fürstenberg.

In 2018, Penner designed the posters for the LA Film Festival, describing her inspiration for the poster by saying that she "wanted to make an image about what it feels like to be one of those wonderful people out there in the dark, watching the magic of movies come to life". Jennifer Cochis, director of the LA Film Festival, spoke of working with Penner for the poster, saying that "Penner's body of work stopped [her] in [her] tracks, that it isn't just one medium lends towards why it's so captivating, there are layers there". Cochis and Penner then met at Cannes Film Festival and "spoke off and on for several months about [Penner's] intention behind the festival artwork, and her narrative behind the piece fit perfectly with what [Cochis] was hoping for".

Penner shares much of her artwork on Instagram under the name Alia Pop, which Katharina Nöstlinger described as "visual Prozac", saying Penner "may be the Frida Kahlo of Instagram".

Since 2008, Penner has also been the Creative Director of Cinespia, the company creating film events at Hollywood Forever Cemetery. As well as curating screenings, she works with a team designing and creating sets based on the films being shown, for cinemagoers to take photos in.
