= I Love You, Honeybear =

Studio album by Father John Misty
- Released: February 9, 2015
- Genres: Indie folk; indie rock; soft rock; baroque pop; folktronica
- Length: 44:54
- Labels: Bella Union; Sub Pop
- Producers: Jonathan Wilson; Josh Tillman

Father John Misty chronology
The History of Caves (2013)	I Love You, Honeybear (2015)	Pure Comedy (2017)

Singles from I Love You, Honeybear
- 1. "Bored in the USA" Released: November 4, 2014; 2. "Chateau Lobby #4 (in C for Two Virgins)" Released: December 9, 2014

I Love You, Honeybear is the second studio album by American folk musician Josh Tillman under his pseudonym Father John Misty. It was released on February 9, 2015, in the United Kingdom and Europe by Bella Union, and in the rest of the world on February 10, 2015, by Sub Pop. Produced by both Tillman and Jonathan Wilson, this is Tillman's second studio album since his departure from Fleet Foxes. The album was also mixed by Phil Ek, and mastered by Greg Calbi at Sterling Sound. According to Tillman, the release is a concept album. I Love You, Honeybear received widespread acclaim from critics, and was ranked as one of the best albums of 2015 by numerous publications.

== Production ==
=== Recording ===
The album was produced by Jonathan Wilson and was mixed by Phil Ek and mastered at Sterling Sound.

=== Music ===
Josh Tillman described I Love You, Honeybear as a concept album about himself. The album deals with Tillman's personal life, including him "engaging in all manner of regrettable behavior," as well as his relationship with his wife Emma. Because of the album's raw, personal nature, Tillman worried about playing the songs live and initially had a hard time playing those songs to people close to him.

Tillman called the song "Bored in the USA" a "sarcastic ballad." Pitchfork described the song as mocking the "entire franchise of privileged white men making their spiritual void the dark center of the universe." Tillman added a laugh track to the song as a way of "neutralizing uncomfortable ideas."

The song "Chateau Lobby #4 (in C for Two Virgins)" was about Tillman and his wife Emma exploring Los Angeles when they first met. "True Affection", an electronic song, dealt with isolation and Tillman's frustration with "trying to woo someone with text message and email and trying to make a connection that way." "Holy Shit" was written on the day Tillman and his wife were married. "Nothing Good Ever Happens at the Goddamn Thirsty Crow" is divided into two parts. The first part, a country blues song, deals with Tillman "turning down aggressive women" at the Crow, a bar in Silver Lake, Los Angeles. The second part, a jazz dirge, deals with men harassing Tillman's wife at the Crow while Tillman is on tour. "I Went to the Store One Day", the last song on the album, chronicles Tillman's and his wife's relation from the day they met in a store to their deaths.

== Release ==
On November 3, 2014, Tillman performed the track "Bored in the USA" on Late Show with David Letterman. The next day, the release date for I Love You, Honeybear was announced. On December 8, 2014, a music video for the song "Chateau Lobby #4 (In C For Two Virgins)" was released. Concerning this music video, Tillman said: "I was going to rent a wedding chapel, get a dozen kittens and stage a kitten wedding, over which I would preside and intercut with performance footage of me lip-syncing the song". As the original idea wasn't realisable, Tillman said about the final version: "I don't care all that much if you like the music video or not. The label isn't crazy about it. Management isn't crazy about it. […] I made it on an iPad on my wedding anniversary with the one I love."

On January 27, 2015, Tillman launched a fake music streaming service called Streamline Audio Protocol where he uploaded a lo-fi version of I Love You, Honeybear for streaming. The version includes the entire album without vocals and other instruments featured in the actual release of the album. Tillman described this service as something where "the consumer can decide quickly and efficiently whether they like a musical composition, based strictly on its formal attributes, enough to spend money on it."

Soon after the release of the Sub Pop deluxe LP version on February 10, 2015, fans and label recognized that the pressing was damaged due to packaging issues which finally caused a warp defect. On February 11, 2015, the label released an official statement, confirming that the first pressing of the deluxe version will no longer be available and that they will press a new version. The statement reads as follows: "[W]e are sorry that many of these fancy, colored-vinyl, deluxe versions of Father John Misty's new album, I Love You, Honeybear are, it appears, warped! In our efforts to replicate the "wow factor" of such legendary album packages as the Rolling Stones' Sticky Fingers zipper cover by Andy Warhol, we wound up accidentally replicating the "defect factor" of the same. In short, the extra, bulging thickness of the pop-up art in the Father John Misty jacket creates a lump that, when the LPs are sealed and packed, pushes into the LPs, causing the vinyl to warp and making that handsome, painstakingly and expensively produced jacket an elaborate record-destroying device. This oversight, and any attendant suffering, is our fault, and we are very sorry. We promise to be less ambitious in the future. We are currently making 100% non-warped, colored-vinyl LPs to replace these damaged LPs."

Further on in the same article the label explains its decision to release I Love You, Honeybear as a double LP: "Due to its length and the wide audio spectrum of the recording, we at Sub Pop, together with Father John Misty, decided that the album sounded much better cut at 45 RPM over 2 pieces of vinyl. Though we all prefer the listening experience of a single piece of vinyl, we decided in this case to prioritize audio quality (an admittedly very subjective determination)."

== Critical reception ==
I Love You, Honeybear ratings
Aggregate scores
Source	Rating
AnyDecentMusic?	8.5/10
Metacritic	87/100
Review scores
Source	Rating
AllMusic	5/5 stars
The A.V. Club	A−
Chicago Tribune	3/4 stars
The Guardian	5/5 stars
Mojo	4/5 stars
NME	9/10
Pitchfork	8.8/10
Q	4/5 stars
Rolling Stone	4/5 stars
Spin	9/10

I Love You, Honeybear was met with widespread critical acclaim. At Metacritic, which assigns a normalized rating out of 100 to reviews from mainstream publications, the album received an average score of 87, based on 34 reviews. Aggregator AnyDecentMusic? gave it 8.5 out of 10, based on their assessment of the critical consensus.

Josh Terry of The A.V. Club said, "With a welcoming tenor and a likeably schmaltzy delivery that finds him displaying loads of range and emotions, he's able to give his subject matter the unforgiving and ultimately warm treatment it deserves." Greg Kot of Chicago Tribune said, "Misty's music cushions some of his most outrageous observations in plush wordless harmonies, strings and orchestral-pop melodies, sometimes to a point where he melts into background music." Mojo stated, "There are grand arrangements and barbed bon mots in the style of Randy Newman and Harry Nilsson, but what's most striking are the more restrained moments." Exclaim!'s Matthew Ritchie gave the album a perfect score, writing that "Tillman's intentions and feelings as a songwriter have never seemed so clear." Laura Studarus of DIY said, "Still, for all his determination to thumb his nose at convention, I Love You, Honeybear finds Tillman falling face first into perhaps the most expected of musical tropes: the "mature" sophomore release."

Alexis Petridis of The Guardian praised the album's lyrics, writing "There are moments when, if you're listening closely, the constant lyrical shifts from caustic irony to plaintive declarations of love can really knock you for six, not least on the title track." Pitchfork's Mike Powell gave the album a "Best New Music" designation, calling it "an album by turns passionate and disillusioned, tender and angry, so cynical it's repulsive and so openhearted it hurts." AllMusic's James Christopher Monger wrote "Honeybear has the architecture of its predecessor, but features braver melodic choices, and at a pure pop level, is the far more challenging LP of the two, but it rewards the listener constantly." Brennan Carley of Spin said, "If Tillman's this brilliantly pointed as a paramour, we're scared to hear the breakup album."

Alex Denney of NME said, "Written around the time Tillman got hitched to this girlfriend, it's a hugely ambitious, caustically funny album about the redemptive possibilities of love, and being heartily sick of your own bullshit." Marc Hirsh of The Boston Globe, on the other hand, criticized the album's lyrics, writing "with a default mode of arch snarkery, Misty doesn't have much to say; he gets off a sharp line here and there, but can't string them together into anything greater." In an otherwise positive review, PopMatters' Sean McCarthy wrote "After an amazingly solid first half, the second half of Honeybear suffers some lag, either because of some tracks have a lack of a memorable hook or chorus ("Strange Encounter"), or experiments that just don't pan out (see the laugh track on "Bored in the U.S.A.")." Will Hermes of Rolling Stone said, "Upping the spectacle from Fear Fun his 2012 debut, I Love You, Honeybear is an autobiographical set about love, marriage and derangement that's both ironic and empathic." Q stated, "For its black lyrical humour alone, I Love You, Honeybear would be a winner. The fact that it's matched to towering songwriting makes it masterful stuff."

=== Rankings ===
Select rankings of I Love You, Honeybear
Publication	List	Rank	Ref.
The A.V. Club	The 15 Best Albums of 2015	5	
Billboard	25 Best Albums of 2015	9	
NME	Albums of the Year 2015	16	
Pitchfork	The 50 Best Albums of 2015	12	
Pitchfork	Readers' Poll Results 2015	5	
Rough Trade	Albums of the Year 2015	2	
Stereogum	The 50 Best Albums of 2015	12	

== Commercial performance ==
I Love You, Honeybear debuted at number 17 on the US Billboard 200 with 28,000 copies sold in its first week. Its debut represented Tillman's best album sales week to date. As of July 2015, the album has sold 74,000 copies domestically. Approximately 30% of the album's units sold have been, both in its debut and cumulatively, in the vinyl configuration.

== Track listing ==
All tracks are written by Josh Tillman.

I Love You, Honeybear track listing
No.	Title	Length
1.	"I Love You, Honeybear"	4:38
2.	"Chateau Lobby #4 (in C for Two Virgins)"	2:50
3.	"True Affection"	3:56
4.	"The Night Josh Tillman Came to Our Apt."	3:36
5.	"When You're Smiling and Astride Me"	4:34
6.	"Nothing Good Ever Happens at the Goddamn Thirsty Crow"	4:34
7.	"Strange Encounter"	4:19
8.	"The Ideal Husband"	3:35
9.	"Bored in the USA"	4:22
10.	"Holy Shit"	4:01
11.	"I Went to the Store One Day"	4:26
Total length:		44:51

== Personnel ==
Credits adapted from the album's liner notes.

Performance

- Josh Tillman (all tracks)
- Jonathan Wilson (except track 11)
- Keefus Ciancia (except tracks 2, 11)
- Benji Lysaght (tracks 1, 4)

Arrangement

- Paul Jacob Cartwright – string arrangement (tracks 1, 3, 5–7, 9–11), mandolin arrangement (tracks 6, 11), interlude arrangement (track 10)
- Gabriel Noel – string arrangement (tracks 1, 4, 8)
- Fred Herrera – horn arrangement (track 2), string arrangement (track 2)
- Josh Tillman – horn arrangement (track 2), string arrangement (track 2)

Additional musicians

- Gabriel Noel – strings (tracks 1, 4, 8), bass (tracks 3, 9–11)
- Paul Jacob Cartwright – strings (tracks 1, 3, 5–7, 10), mandolin (track 6), violin (tracks 9–11)
- Javier Rodriguez – trumpet (track 2)
- Annie Barrera – trumpet (track 2)
- Hector Castro – violin (track 2)
- Jorge Cardenas – violin (track 2)
- Daphne Chen – violin (tracks 9–11)
- Elizabeth Bacher – violin (tracks 9–11)
- Thomas Lea – viola (tracks 9–11)
- Claire Courchene – cello (tracks 9–11)
- Chavonne Stewart – vocals (track 5)
- Alethea Mills – vocals (track 5)
- Brian Walsh – clarinet (track 6)
- Benji Lysaght – additional guitar (track 6)
- Farmer Dave Scher – lap steel (track 7)
- Andres Renteria – congas (track 7)

Production

- Jonathan Wilson – production, mixing (tracks 2, 8)
- Josh Tillman – production
- Phil Ek – mixing
- Bryce Gonzales – engineering
- Greg Calbi – mastering

Design

- Stacey Rozich – paintings
- Alia Penner – inside art
- Emma Elizabeth Tillman – photos
- Sasha Barr – art direction
- Josh Tillman – art direction

== Charts ==
=== Weekly charts ===
Chart performance for I Love You, Honeybear
Chart (2015)	Peak position
Australian Albums (ARIA)	38
Canadian Albums (Billboard)	17
Belgian Albums (Ultratop Flanders)	54
Belgian Albums (Ultratop Wallonia)	86
Danish Albums (Hitlisten)	29
Dutch Albums (Album Top 100)	27
French Albums (SNEP)	104
New Zealand Albums (RMNZ)	36
Norwegian Albums (VG-lista)	10
Swedish Albums (Sverigetopplistan)	36
UK Albums (Official Charts)	14
US Billboard 200	17
US Americana/Folk Albums (Billboard)	2
US Top Alternative Albums (Billboard)	3
US Top Rock Albums (Billboard)	3

=== Year-end charts ===
2015 year-end chart performance for I Love You, Honeybear
Chart (2015)	Position
US Top Rock Albums (Billboard)	65

== Certifications ==
Certifications for I Love You, Honeybear
Region	Certification	Certified units/sales
United Kingdom (BPI)	Silver	60,000^{‡}
^{‡} Sales+streaming figures based on certification alone.

== Release history ==
Release dates and formats for I Love You, Honeybear
Region	Date	Label	Format	Ref.
United Kingdom and Europe	February 9, 2015	Bella Union	CD; digital download	
Rest of the world	February 10, 2015	Sub Pop	CD; digital download	
