= Vacilando Territory Blues =

Studio album by J. Tillman
- Released: January 12, 2009
- Recorded: 2008
- Genre: Folk; Indie folk
- Length: 49:27
- Label: Western Vinyl
- Producer: Kory Kruckenberg

J. Tillman chronology
Cancer and Delirium (2007)	Vacilando Territory Blues (2009)	Year in the Kingdom (2009)

Professional ratings
Aggregate scores
Source	Rating
Metacritic	73/100
Review scores
Source	Rating
Pitchfork	7.6/10

Vacilando Territory Blues is J. Tillman's sixth album. It was released via the Western Vinyl label. The label writes: "Vacilando Territory Blues came as the result of three different recording attempts in 2008, in which entire sessions were scrapped, and ultimately the majority of the final material would surface and be recorded days before mastering. The push and pull of this record veers sharply from the tone of Tillman's previous releases, which for the most part, adhere to a singular mood and stylistic execution. The tension dynamically between songs like "Firstborn" and "New Imperial Grand Blues" is hard to reconcile, but the way the songs are framed herein belies a cohesion not dissimilar to classic oddball albums such as After the Gold Rush."

In an interview for Hear Ya, Tillman said about Vacilando Territory Blues: "The initial vision was for that record was to be a full band kind of deal. Like a straight 'rock' thing. I recorded about 7 or 8 songs like that and thought I'd slap on a few solo acoustic arrangements on there and it would be done. But, I ended up being just kind of dissatisfied with it. So, I wrote 7 or 8 more songs and at the end of the day was only comfortable with a few of those as well. I probably recorded 40 songs for that record and there would be 3 or 4 of each batch that ultimately ended up together on the record. I'd had such a hard time finding a central theme for the record that eventually the central theme became not having a theme at all. That idea was really attractive to me. There was a time that year where I said, 'I can't do this anymore'. I got into a bad headspace feeling like this (my solo career) was not a sustainable venture. That created the tone of the record for me. It turned into a record about the angst of making a record, which was a good depiction of where I was. I really couldn't stand to listen to that record for a while. But, now I think I'm in a place where I can actually enjoy it. Not like I sit around and listen to my own music all the time or anything."

== Track listing ==
No.	Title	Length
1.	"All You See"	0:47
2.	"No Occasion"	3:51
3.	"Firstborn"	3:29
4.	"Vessels"	3:46
5.	"James Blues"	2:30
6.	"Steel On Steel"	4:39
7.	"Labourless Land"	3:24
8.	"Barter Blues"	7:24
9.	"New Imperial Grand Blues"	4:02
10.	"Master's House"	4:56
11.	"Someone, With Child"	3:16
12.	"Above All Men"	3:53
13.	"Vacilando Territory"	3:30
Total length:		49:27

== Music videos ==
Title	Directed	Link
"Firstborn"	Matt Blodgett & Matt Mastrorocco	link
