= Singing Ax =

Studio album by J. Tillman
- Released: September 14, 2010
- Recorded: February 2010
- Genre: Folk
- Length: 45:04
- Label: Western Vinyl
- Producers: Steve Albini, Bob Weston

J. Tillman chronology
Year in the Kingdom (2009)	Singing Ax (2010)	Fear Fun (2012)

Professional ratings
Review scores
Source	Rating
Paste	7.6/10
Pitchfork	7.4/10

Singing Ax is the eighth studio album by American folk musician J. Tillman, released via Western Vinyl. It is the final album Tillman released under his own name. The album is an LP and MP3 release only. It was recorded in three days in February 2010 by Steve Albini at Electrical Audio in Chicago, and was mastered by Bob Weston.

In an interview following his transition from J. Tillman to Father John Misty, Tillman explained why there had been so little promotion for Singing Ax: "I didn't tour for Singing Ax or even promote it in a single way. I didn't do a single interview, or anything. All I can say is that it was up on the Western Vinyl webpage, and that really was about all of the promotion it got, if you even want to call that promotion. I didn't put it out in the UK because I didn't want to have to go over there and tour it. It really was like throwing my hands up in the air on that project. The last song on there, "A Seat at the Table", that is what that was about. It was like 'I'm done.'"

The album leaked onto the internet on August 15, 2010.

== Track listing ==
No.	Title	Length
1.	"Three Sisters"	6:37
2.	"Diamondback"	3:43
3.	"Love No Less Worthy"	3:15
4.	"One Task"	4:34
5.	"Our Beloved Tyrant"	5:18
6.	"Tillman's Rag"	3:04
7.	"Mere Ornaments"	4:47
8.	"Singing Ax"	3:43
9.	"Madness on the Mountain"	3:22
10.	"Maria"	2:35
11.	"A Seat at the Table"	4:06
Total length:		45:04
