= Cancer and Delirium =

Studio album by J. Tillman
- Released: June 15, 2007
- Recorded: 2007
- Genre: Folk
- Length: 35:45
- Label: Yer Bird
- Producer: Kory Kruckenberg

J. Tillman chronology
Minor Works (2006)	Cancer and Delirium (2007)	Vacilando Territory Blues (2009)

Cancer and Delirium is J. Tillman's fifth album, released via the Yer Bird label. The cover photo was taken by Dominique Jaquin.

Morgan King, the former owner of Yer Bird, wrote, that "on Cancer and Delirium Tillman strikes the perfect balance between the intimacy of his earlier releases [...] with the masterful, nuanced melodic sense of his excellent 2006 Fargo release, Minor Works. The songs are imbued with the same strikingly disconsolate singing and devastatingly poignant prose that J. Tillman is known for and accented with gorgeous, spare arrangements."

In an interview for SCTAS, Tillman said: "Most of the songs were written during a week off alone in Paris, and the album title came from a line in Tropic Of Cancer, which essentially is about being young and poor and isolated in Paris, so it all came together. That phrase just kept running through my head. That record is also my first time experimenting with some alternate tunings, which I think contributes to the 'prettiness' of it."

== Track listing ==
No.	Title	Length
1.	"Visions of a Troubled Mind"	3:15
2.	"Milk White Air"	3:30
3.	"Evans and Falls"	4:08
4.	"A Fine Suit"	2:45
5.	"Ribbons of Glass"	5:06
6.	"Under the Sun"	4:26
7.	"If I Get to the Borderline"	3:09
8.	"When I Light Your Darkened Door"	5:03
9.	"How Much Mystery"	4:24
Total length:		35:46
