= The History of Caves =

Soundtrack album by Josh Tillman
- Released: November 28, 2013
- Genre: Soundtrack, folk
- Length: 14:23
- Label: Sub Pop

Josh Tillman chronology
Fear Fun (2012)	The History of Caves (2013)	I Love You, Honeybear (2015)

Professional ratings
Review scores
Source	Rating
PopMatters	(5/10)

The History of Caves is a soundtrack by American folk musician Josh Tillman and was released under his own name via Sub Pop. The album is an LP release only and is a "Black Friday exclusive", limited to 2,000 copies. It was recorded as a score for the identically titled short film of his wife, Emma Elizabeth Tillman. Except for the a capella track "Titles Theme For Boy Voices" the album is wholly instrumental. It is the first album released under the name "Josh Tillman".

Asked by Rolling Stone how he came to compose the soundtrack for the film, Tillman answered: "[Emma] just kind of rolled over in bed and asked me to. It's pretty simple. I don't have any real aspirations to score films or anything, but it was an instance where I understood her ... I'm trying to avoid using the word "vision" ... I understood the way in which she wanted to communicate her story."

== Track listing ==
No.	Title	Length
1.	"Finish Those Cigarettes & Go to Bed"	2:44
2.	"News of the World"	0:59
3.	"Alternate Title Score 777"	0:43
4.	"Dial Tone"	1:23
5.	"I Call It the Demon Tree"	1:04
6.	"Of Course I Live with Them"	2:00
7.	"Car Chase Theme"	1:21
8.	"Dial Tone 2"	1:09
9.	"Tender Is the Night in Paperback"	1:26
10.	"Titles Theme for Boy Voices"	1:34
Total length:		14:23
