= Fear Fun =

Studio album by Father John Misty
- Released: April 30, 2012
- Genre: Indie folk; indie rock; psychedelic folk
- Length: 43:24
- Label: Sub Pop; Bella Union
- Producer: Jonathan Wilson; Josh Tillman

Father John Misty chronology
Singing Ax (2010)	Fear Fun (2012)	The History Of Caves (2013)

Fear Fun is the debut studio album released by American folk musician Josh Tillman under his pseudonym Father John Misty. It was released on April 30, 2012, in the UK and Europe by Bella Union, and in the rest of the world on May 1, 2012, by Sub Pop. Produced by both Tillman and Jonathan Wilson, the album was released following Tillman's departure from Fleet Foxes.

The album debuted at No. 43 on Top Rock Albums and at No. 123 on Billboard 200, with 4,000 copies sold in its first week. It has sold 83,000 copies in the US as of February 2015.

== Background and recording ==
In 2009, Josh Tillman decided that he no longer wished to record under the pseudonym J. Tillman. In 2012, he stated, "I remember specifically finishing Year in the Kingdom and then beginning to work on what would become Singing Ax, and I clearly knew Singing Ax was going to be the last 'J. Tillman' record ever because I just didn't want to do it anymore."

Underlining this change in character and the choosing of the new moniker, Tillman admits the following in an interview for the Dallas Observer: "I used to do these J. Tillman shows and I would play my sad-wizard, Dungeons and Dragons music and watch people's eyes glaze over [...] Then, in between songs, I would start being myself and shooting the shit and telling jokes. ... All of a sudden, people were rapt with attention and I had this very devastating and sobering realization that I was way better at that part of the show than the music part."

In addition to the quote above Tillman states that personally he wasn't pleased with the slow and sad style his music was often associated with: "Songwriting for me had always only been interesting and necessary because I saw it as this vehicle for truth, but I had this realization that all I had really done with it was lick my wounds for years and years, and become more and more isolated from people and experiences. I don’t even like wound-licking music, I want to listen to someone rip their arm off and beat themselves with it. I don’t believe that until now I’ve ever put anything at risk in my music. I was hell-bent on putting my preciousness at stake in order to find something worth singing about."

This contrast between the music he was making and the person he really was led to a crisis concerning his work as a musician: "I lost all interest in writing music, or identifying as a ‘songwriter’. I got into my van with enough mushrooms to choke a horse and started driving down the coast with nowhere to go. After a few weeks, I was writing a novel, which is where I finally found my narrative voice. The voice that is actually useful. It was a while before that voice started manifesting in a musical way, but once I settled in the Laurel Canyon spider-shack where I'm living now, I spent months demoing all these weird-ass songs about weird-ass experiences almost in real-time, and kind of had this musical ‘Oh-there-I-am’ moment, identical to how I felt when I was writing the book. It was unbelievably liberating. I knew there was never any going back to the place I was writing from before, which was a huge relief. The monkey got banished off my back."

The "monkey" he's speaking about is specified in an interview for No Depression as a wrong idea of oneself: "When I was in high school I wanted to be an obscure singer-songwriter. I really wanted to be one of those guys that nobody knew about, and in some weird way, I fulfilled that. It all makes perfect sense to me. I wanted to be like Townes Van Zandt, Nick Drake, or Gram Parsons. Somebody who was respected but unknown. That was the most romantic thing to me. Guys like Richard Buckner. And as I was doing those records, I felt like I was part of the club, and I got to meet some of those guys. It was like I got invited into the inner sanctum. I was really into it for a long time, but I just ran out of things to do in it. [...] At some point, I realized that in order to go where I needed to go, and where I wanted to creatively, I had to kill that mythology and I had to kill that idea. I said to myself "You are not "that", you are a man." You have to not want to be anyone else, or want to be "anything" else. You have to just be what you are. I realized that I am a smart-ass, and that I have always been a kind of smart-ass. So when I realized that, I realized that I had an obligation to start including my sense of humor and my actual, true, conversational voice in my music in order for it to be exclusive to me, and not to be just my best stab at trying to be a preexisting idea."

Not fulfilling preexisting ideas Tillman used some sort of arbitrariness finding his new moniker 'Father John Misty'. For TheVine he explained himself as following: "I had to give it a name, so I kind of wanted to confuse people with this ridiculous red herring [and] admittedly patently ridiculous name that’s also phonetically beautifully and looks good in print. Sort of a name I’ve decided to give to this weird, subconscious, dream fragmentation I have of this homosexual, shamanic drifter who bounces around [and] stirs up weird shit in my dreams. Like making out with my brother. So I guess the aggregate of all those things just felt right. But really and truly, the whole thing is just kind of about the fact that it really doesn’t matter what the fuck you call yourself, as long as the goods are in the explicit honesty."

== Critical reception ==
Professional ratings
Aggregate scores
Source	Rating
AnyDecentMusic?	7.6/10
Metacritic	83/100
Review scores
Source	Rating
AllMusic	4/5 stars
The A.V. Club	B
The Guardian	4/5 stars
The Independent	5/5 stars
MSN Music (Expert Witness)	B+
NME	8/10
Pitchfork	7.3/10
Q	4/5 stars
Spin	7/10
Uncut	8/10

Leonie Cooper of NME said that Hollywood Forever Cemetery Sings was a "serious contender for song of the year".

== Track listing ==
All tracks are written by Josh Tillman.

No.	Title	Length
1.	"Funtimes in Babylon"	3:39
2.	"Nancy from Now On"	3:54
3.	"Hollywood Forever Cemetery Sings"	3:10
4.	"I'm Writing a Novel"	3:35
5.	"O I Long to Feel Your Arms Around Me"	2:23
6.	"Misty's Nightmares 1 & 2"	3:13
7.	"Only Son of the Ladiesman"	4:09
8.	"This Is Sally Hatchet"	3:57
9.	"Well, You Can Do It Without Me"	2:43
10.	"Now I'm Learning to Love the War"	4:16
11.	"Tee Pees 1–12"	3:16
12.	"Everyman Needs a Companion"	5:19
Total length:		43:24

== Music videos ==
Title	Directed	Link
"Hollywood Forever Cemetery Sings"	Noel Paul	link
"Nancy from Now On"	Amy Cargill & Josh Tillman	link
"This Is Sally Hatchet"		link
"I'm Writing a Novel"	Noel Paul	link
"Funtimes in Babylon"	Josh Tillman & Grant James	link

== Personnel ==
Musicians

- Josh Tillman – performance
- Keefus Green – piano (tracks 1, 2, 4, 8, 11), synthesizers (track 2), mellotron (track 8)
- Wylie Gelber – bass guitar (tracks 6, 9, 11)
- Hugo Nicolson – omni-chord programming (track 2)
- Gabriel Noel – strings (tracks 1, 2, 8, 10), upright bass (track 1)
- Ben Peeler – pedal steel (tracks 11, 12)
- Leslie Stevens – backing vocals (tracks 1, 5, 12)
- Zach Tillman – bass guitar (tracks 5, 10)
- Sara Watkins – fiddle (track 11)
- Casey Wescott – bass frequency (track 3, 7), harpsichord (track 8), piano (track 8)
- Jonathan Wilson – electric guitar (tracks 4, 6, 8, 9), bass guitar (tracks 2, 4, 8, 12), piano (tracks 6, 7, 10, 12), 12-string guitars (track 6, 7, 12), mandolin (tracks 1, 12), pedal construction (tracks 4, 8), VOX organ (tracks 4, 9), Hammond organ (tracks 5, 12), Wurlitzer (tracks 10, 11), trumpet (track 1), acoustic guitars (track 1), baritone guitar (track 10)

Production

- Jonathan Wilson – production, engineering
- Josh Tillman – production
- Hugo Nicolson – engineering
- Wylie Gelber – assistant engineering
- Phil Ek – mixing
- Greg Calbi – mastering

Design

- Dimitri Drjuchin – cover painting, interior artwork
- Emma Garr – insert photo
- Jeff Kleinsmith – design
- Sasha Barr – design
