= I Will Return =

Studio album by J. Tillman
- Released: 2005
- Recorded: Winter 2004
- Genre: Folk
- Length: 47:58
- Label: Keep Recordings
- Producer: Eric Fisher

J. Tillman chronology
Untitled No. 1 (2003)	I Will Return (2005)	Long May You Run, J. Tillman (2006)

Alternative cover
- Fargo re-release

I Will Return is J. Tillman's second album. It was originally released personally in 2004. Later in 2005 it was re-released in limited edition of 150 copies through Keep Recordings. In 2007 it was again re-released together with Long May You Run, J. Tillman on Fargo Records as a double-CD.

== Track listing ==
All tracks are written by Josh Tillman.

No.	Title	Length
1.	"Lilac Hem"	4:06
2.	"Your Mother's Ghost"	4:49
3.	"This Jealous Blood"	6:17
4.	"I Will Return"	5:35
5.	"Cecille, My Love"	5:59
6.	"A Hit Play"	3:32
7.	"A Golden String for Your Nest"	5:15
8.	"Trail of Red, Bride in White"	8:10
9.	"An Occurrence at the River Jordan"	4:15
Total length:		47:58

== Personnel ==
1. Cello – Phil Peterson
2. French Horn – Josh Hoffman
3. Mastered By – Tim Walsh
4. Piano, Electric Guitar – Eric Fisher
5. Recorded By, Mixed By – Eric Fisher
6. Songwriter – J. Tillman
7. Vocals [Uncredited], Guitar [Uncredited] – J. Tillman
