= Year in the Kingdom =

Studio album by J. Tillman
- Released: September 28, 2009
- Recorded: 2009
- Genre: Folk
- Length: 34:10
- Label: Western Vinyl
- Producer: Kory Kruckenberg; Bill Patton

J. Tillman chronology
Vacilando Territory Blues (2009)	Year in the Kingdom (2009)	Singing Ax (2010)

Professional ratings
Aggregate scores
Source	Rating
Metacritic	66/100
Review scores
Source	Rating
Drowned in Sound	8/10
Pitchfork	6.9/10
Rolling Stone	2.5/5 stars

Year in the Kingdom is J. Tillman's seventh album. It was released via Western Vinyl. On the label's website it reads: "Unknown to just about everyone, Tillman started recording in April, tracking most of the instruments during the two-week session himself. Hammered dulcimer, banjo, recorder, cymbals of varying size and wheezing air organs all feature heavily and lend YITK its bizarre scale, conjuring tidal shifts with tiny movements. The string arrangements, performed by Jenna Conrad, as well as transposed from Tillman's sung direction, were intended to rest on chords almost counter-intuitively, bringing to bloom complex, decontextualized tones. Most noticeable upon first listen, however, is the production itself. While most of Tillman's records evidence some shambolic home recording, YITK is undisturbed throughout. Out up front of the mix, and dry as a bone, Tillman's voice is featured in a way unlike any of his previous records."

In an interview for Hear Ya, Tillman said about Year in the Kingdom: "The theme of YITK is based on an end of life perspective. It's not a literal year, but more like an anticipation of the reckoning that happens at the end of your life. I'm very intrigued by the elastic nature of memory—or, what you remember vs. what has actually happened. Brain chemistry is such a complicated thing. It takes a lot of brain power and creativity to memorize, catalogue and maintain the minutia of your experiences to sustain you and make you keep doing what you do. You re-create past events in a non-objective way and over huge periods of time you get distilled into this nebulous ghost. The YITK thing was more about looking back and remembering things in a totally inaccurate way, a way that's maybe more joyful than it actually was. There have been things that have come into my life over the past few years that I know I will be able to conjure up at the end of my life and feel good about. It's not about everything being great. It's about everything being an exercise in creativity."

== Track listing ==
No.	Title	Length
1.	"Year in the Kingdom"	2:39
2.	"Crosswinds"	4:19
3.	"Earthly Bodies"	4:19
4.	"Howling Light"	3:34
5.	"Though I Have Wronged You"	3:24
6.	"Age of Man"	5:14
7.	"There Is No Good in Me"	5:04
8.	"Marked in the Valley"	4:03
9.	"Light of the Living"	1:34
Total length:		34:10

== Music videos ==
Title	Link
"Though I Have Wronged You"	link
