= God's Favorite Customer =

Studio album by Father John Misty
- Released: June 1, 2018
- Genre: Soft rock; folk rock; baroque pop; glam pop
- Length: 38:34
- Label: Sub Pop; Bella Union
- Producer: Josh Tillman; Jonathan Rado; Dave Cerminara; Trevor Spencer; Jonathan Wilson^{[a]}

Father John Misty chronology
Pure Comedy (2017)	God's Favorite Customer (2018)	Anthem +3 (2020)

Singles from God's Favorite Customer
- 1. "Mr. Tillman" Released: February 20, 2018; 2. "Disappointing Diamonds Are the Rarest of Them All" Released: April 18, 2018; 3. "Just Dumb Enough to Try" Released: April 18, 2018

God's Favorite Customer (or Mr Tillman's Wild Ride) is the fourth studio album by American musician Josh Tillman under the stage name Father John Misty. It was released by Sub Pop and Bella Union on June 1, 2018. The album was primarily produced by Tillman himself and Jonathan Rado, alongside a variety of collaborators including previous engineers Trevor Spencer and Dave Cerminara, with further production contributions by Tillman's long-time producer Jonathan Wilson. It also features a variety of musical collaborators, including The Haxan Cloak, Mark Ronson, Weyes Blood, and members of Tillman's touring band.

== Background and release ==
On July 23, 2017, during an Australian concert in support of his previous album Pure Comedy, Tillman announced that he was soon to be mixing his next album, which he jokingly referred to as Pure Comedy 2. In an interview with NME, Tillman revealed that the album was mostly written on the toilet and was "pretty much done", with the exception of a synth bass part on one song. He announced that the album was to be self-produced, and would not follow a singular concept, like his previous albums, which he referred to as "pretentious". He also revealed that the album would include ten tracks, with "sprightly" tempos.

Tillman teased potential song titles from the album on November 16, including "Ouch, I’m Drowning”, “Dum Dum Blues”, “Mr Tillman, Please Exit The Lobby” and “Well, We’re Only People And There’s Nothing Much We Can Do About It”, revealing that "most of this next album was written in a six-week period where I was kind of on the straits", whilst living in a hotel for two months. He noted that the album was about "misadventure", and summarised it as "a heartache album", inspired by an event in which his "life blew up".

Tillman debuted the track "Mr. Tillman" on September 6, performing it acoustically at Third Man Records in Nashville, Tennessee. On February 15, 2018, he debuted the song with a live band in Tokyo, and released it as the album's lead single five days later.

Tillman revealed the album's title on April 17, 2018, as well as its release date and track listing. He also shared the tracks "Disappointing Diamonds Are the Rarest of Them All" and "Just Dumb Enough to Try" the following day. The album was erroneously made available to stream for a short period of time on Apple Music on April 18 before being removed.

== Critical reception ==
Professional ratings
Aggregate scores
Source	Rating
AnyDecentMusic?	7.8/10
Metacritic	83/100
Review scores
Source	Rating
AllMusic	4/5 stars
The A.V. Club	B+
Entertainment Weekly	A−
The Guardian	4/5 stars
The Independent	4/5 stars
Mojo	4/5 stars
NME	4/5 stars
Pitchfork	8.5/10
Q	4/5 stars
Rolling Stone	4/5 stars

On Metacritic, which assigns a normalized rating out of 100 to reviews from mainstream publications, God's Favorite Customer has an average score of 83 based on 29 reviews, indicating "universal acclaim".

Reviewing the album for AllMusic, Stephen Thomas Erlewine stated that, "Compared to Pure Comedy... God's Favorite Customer feels light and breezy. That's intentional, of course. Father John Misty never makes a move that isn't considered, and God's Favorite Customer is designed to be the digestif after a multi-course feast: a palette cleanser that riffs upon the flavors lingering on the tongue." In The A.V. Club, Matt Williams wrote that the album's "intimacy and honesty results in some of Tillman’s most stunning songwriting". Similarly Robin Murray wrote for NME that "in remaining tight-lipped, this taciturn new aspect to Father John Misty might be his most genuinely sincere, and his most profound". Jeremy D. Larson of Pitchfork noted that the album "exhibits a new sense of empathy and vulnerability while losing none of his wit". Writing for Rolling Stone, David Fricke compared the album to the works of John Lennon in the 1970s, concluding that "What lifts God's Favorite Customer beyond homage is Tillman's slicing, free-associative candor as he examines the cost in sanity and constancy of his craft and touring life". Leah Greenblatt of Entertainment Weekly felt that in its best moments, the album shows Tillman to be a "master of classic melody, even if the source is meta, and something like a true poet when he wants to be".

In Consequence of Sound, Steven Edelstone wrote that God's Favorite Customer is Tillman's "most succinct effort yet, rarely ever breaking from the album’s overall narrative", and that "his most brutally honest lyrics are his most profound", but criticised the diminishing presence of Tillman's "trademark sense of humor" that had previously "separated him from the rest of the singer-songwriter pack". In a less positive review for Spin, Joshua Copperman stated that "the album shines when the humor returns" but concluded that "we're stuck with a record that’s both intentionally and unintentionally frustrating", writing that Tillman "doesn’t come to any greater conclusion than "We're Only People"", criticising the album's closing song.

== Track listing ==
All tracks are written by Josh Tillman.

No.	Title	Producer(s)	Length
1.	"Hangout at the Gallows" (or "You've the Answer")	Tillman; Jonathan Rado; Dave Cerminara; Jonathan Wilson^{[a]}	4:55
2.	"Mr. Tillman" (or "Bowery")	Tillman; Rado	3:03
3.	"Just Dumb Enough to Try"	Tillman; Cerminara	4:02
4.	"Date Night"	Tillman; Rado	2:30
5.	"Please Don't Die"	Tillman; Rado	3:24
6.	"The Palace" (or "I Love You But No, You're Not")	Tillman; Trevor Spencer	4:09
7.	"Disappointing Diamonds Are the Rarest of Them All"	Tillman; Cerminara	2:23
8.	"God's Favorite Customer"	Tillman; Rado; Wilson^{[a]}	5:21
9.	"The Songwriter"	Tillman; Spencer	3:45
10.	"We're Only People (And There's Not Much Anyone Can Do About That)"	Tillman; Rado	5:02
Total length:			38:34

Notes

- ^{^[a]} signifies "very special thanks".

== Personnel ==
Credits adapted from liner notes and Qobuz.

Musicians

- Josh Tillman – guitar (1–8, 10), drums (1–5, 7, 8, 10), tambourine (1, 10), bass (2), piano (3, 6, 8–10), finger picking (3), Mellotron (3, 10), harmonica (5, 8), sleigh bells (5), additional instrumentation (6, 9), string arrangement (3)
- Jonathan Rado – bass (1, 4, 5, 8, 10), guitar (1, 5, 8), DX-1 (4) piano (5), synthesizer (7), organ (8)
- Jon Titterington – piano (1, 2, 4, 7), glockenspiel (2), synthesizer (2), accordion (5), trumpet (5), Wurlitzer (7, 8)
- Bobby Krlic – strings (1), horns (1)
- Jonathan Wilson – bass synthesizer (1), Crumar (1), organ (5, 9), electric (8)
- Elijah Thomson – bass (3), solo (3)
- Gabe Noel – cellos (3, 6, 10), lap steel (3, 10), string arrangement (3, 10)
- Mark Ronson – bass (7)
- David Vandervelde – guitars (7, 10)
- James King – saxophone (7)
- Natalie Mering – vocals (8)

Technical

- Josh Tillman – production, mixing
- Jonathan Rado – production (1, 2, 4, 5, 8, 10)
- Dave Cerminara – production (1, 3, 7), mixing
- Trevor Spencer – production (6, 9)
- Jonathan Wilson – additional production (1, 8), mixing
- Ivan Wayman – engineering (4, 8)

Artwork

- Josh Tillman – art direction
- Sasha Barr – art direction
- Pari Dukovic – cover photo

== Charts ==
Chart (2018)	Peak position
Australian Albums (ARIA)	9
Austrian Albums (Ö3 Austria)	70
Belgian Albums (Ultratop Flanders)	32
Belgian Albums (Ultratop Wallonia)	132
Canadian Albums (Billboard)	66
Danish Albums (Hitlisten)	25
Dutch Albums (Album Top 100)	34
German Albums (Offizielle Top 100)	49
Irish Albums (IRMA)	11
New Zealand Heatseeker Albums (RMNZ)	2
Norwegian Albums (VG-lista)	29
Scottish Albums (OCC)	8
Spanish Albums (PROMUSICAE)	26
Swedish Albums (Sverigetopplistan)	32
Swiss Albums (Schweizer Hitparade)	55
UK Albums (OCC)	12
US Billboard 200	18
US Top Alternative Albums (Billboard)	1
US Americana/Folk Albums (Billboard)	1
US Top Rock Albums (Billboard)	2
