= Father John Misty =

American musician (born 1981)

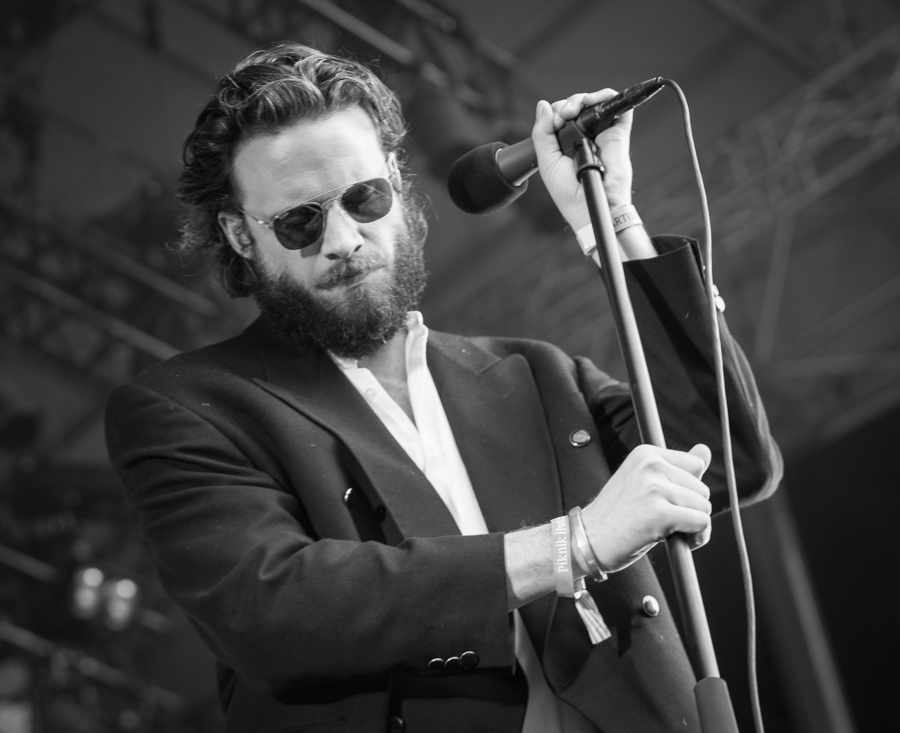
- Tillman performing in June 2017
- Born: Joshua Michael Tillman; May 3, 1981 (age 45); Rockville, Maryland, U.S.
- Other name: J. Tillman
- Occupations: Musician; singer; songwriter; record producer
- Years active: 2001–present
- Spouse: Emma Elizabeth Garr (m. 2013)
- Children: 1
- Musical career
- Genres: Indie rock; indie folk; folk rock; chamber pop; progressive folk
- Instruments: Vocals; guitar; piano; drums; percussion; harmonica; bass
- Labels: Sub Pop; Yer Bird; Western Vinyl; Bella Union
- Formerly of: Fleet Foxes; Saxon Shore
- Website: fatherjohnmisty.com

Joshua Michael Tillman (born May 3, 1981), better known by his stage name Father John Misty, is an American musician. He is known for his satirical lyrics and eccentric performance style.

Tillman began his career in Seattle in the early 2000s. One of his demos reached Damien Jurado, and in 2003 he opened for him on his tour. Tillman began performing and releasing studio albums under the name J. Tillman. The albums were characterized by their folk sound and intimate lyrics. In 2008 Tillman joined the band Fleet Foxes as their drummer during the tour for their first record; he went on to play on their second album, Helplessness Blues (2011). Tillman left the band soon after the record was completed and started a new solo project, now under the name Father John Misty, releasing his first record, Fear Fun, in 2012. The album was a radical departure from his previous output, featuring a more marked, indie rock sound and satirical lyrics. His second album, I Love You, Honeybear (2015), received widespread acclaim, and was said to be a concept album based on Tillman's relationship with his wife, Emma. Honeybear was followed by another concept album, Pure Comedy (2017), exchanging the romantic content of the former for a nihilistic view of society, consumerism, and politics. His next two records, God's Favorite Customer (2018) and Chloë and the Next 20th Century (2022), explore soft rock and traditional pop respectively.

During his career he has been either a permanent or touring member of Demon Hunter, Saxon Shore, Jeffertitti's Nile, Pearly Gate Music, Siberian, Har Mar Superstar, Poor Moon, Low Hums, and Jonathan Wilson, and has toured extensively with Jesse Sykes and David Bazan. As a record producer and songwriter, Tillman has also made contributions to albums by more mainstream artists such as Beyoncé, Lady Gaga, Kid Cudi, Lana Del Rey, and Post Malone.

== Early life ==
Joshua Michael Tillman was born in Rockville, Maryland, on May 3, 1981, the son of evangelical Christian parents Barbara and Irvin C. Tillman, an engineer at Hewlett-Packard, who met at a Christian youth group. His mother was raised in Ethiopia, where her parents were missionaries. The eldest of four children, he has a brother and two sisters. Before he settled on a career as a musician, he briefly had ambitions of becoming a pastor because of the performance aspect, when he was approximately six years old. He has commented that his parents strongly emphasized Christianity in his upbringing, to a degree that he has described as "culturally oppressive". He was estranged from his parents for many years, but they have since reconciled.

After learning drums at a young age, Tillman learned guitar when he was 12. He attended a Baptist church and an Episcopal elementary school while growing up, then a Pentecostal Messianic day school. He said he was naïve when he was growing up because there was limited secular cultural influence within the home and no secular music was allowed. Around the age of 17, his parents modified their cultural stipulations; he was allowed to listen to secular music that had a "spiritual theme". For this reason, his early purchases included albums like Bob Dylan's Slow Train Coming as he was able to convince his parents that Dylan was classified as a "Christian artist".

== Career ==
=== Early career and Fleet Foxes (2004–2012) ===
After attending Nyack College in New York from 1999 to 2002, Tillman moved to Seattle when he was 21. He found a job there working at a bakery, which allowed him to record at night before his 4:30 am shift began. A demo he made eventually found its way to Seattle singer and songwriter Damien Jurado. A year later, Tillman started opening for Jurado. At shows Tillman would distribute CD-R copies of songs that would later become his album I Will Return. During the tour, he also struck up a friendship with Eric Fisher, who produced another CD-R album, Long May You Run. Tillman and Jurado both later signed on for a U.S. tour with Richard Buckner.

From 2001 to 2004, Tillman played drums in the instrumental post-rock band Saxon Shore, touring extensively and drumming on their first two recordings. In 2006, the independent label Fargo Records released Tillman's first properly distributed solo album, Minor Works, and reissued I Will Return and Long May You Run as a two-disc set the same year. In 2007, Yer Bird Records released his more elaborately arranged fourth album, Cancer and Delirium.

After signing to independent record label Western Vinyl, Tillman released two albums in 2009, Vacilando Territory Blues and Year in the Kingdom. Tillman said he wrote the title track of Vacilando Territory Blues to describe imagery he associates with his move to Seattle. His brother Zach moved there as well and is now in the musical group Pearly Gate Music. The following year, Tillman released Singing Ax.

In 2008, Tillman joined Seattle folk rock band Fleet Foxes as their drummer. After extensive touring with Fleet Foxes, promoting their album Helplessness Blues, Tillman played his final show with the band in Tokyo on January 20, 2012.

=== Father John Misty performing name and Fear Fun (2012–2014) ===
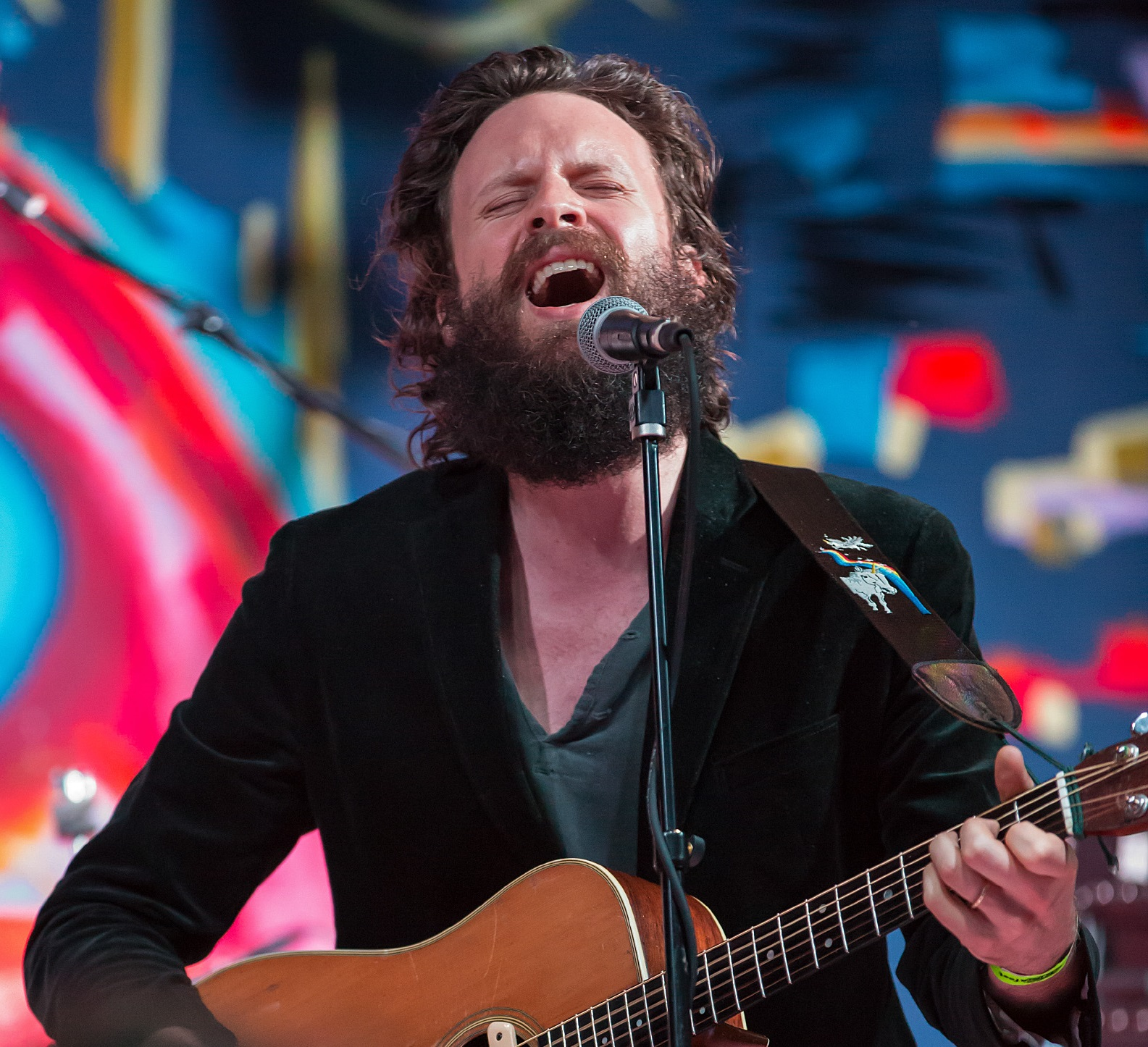
Tillman performing in 2014

After leaving Fleet Foxes, Tillman moved to Los Angeles and signed to his next record label Sub Pop. Dissatisfied with the slow and sad music he had previously made, he adopted the performing name of Father John Misty. The first album under his new name, Fear Fun, was released on May 1, 2012. A couple of months before the release of the album a video was released for the song "Hollywood Forever Cemetery Sings" starring Parks and Recreation's Aubrey Plaza. The album was a dramatic departure from any of Tillman's prior releases.

As Father John Misty, Tillman was featured on Kid Cudi's 2013 album Indicud. Tillman wrote an essay about Damien Jurado's recording, Brothers and Sisters of the Eternal Son (Secretly Canadian, 2014). He also wrote the soundtrack for a short film called The History of Caves, directed by his wife, filmmaker Emma Elizabeth Tillman.

The "Limited Run Promotional Poster" was available at the artist's website, and promoted a purported release called New Winter, described as a "Christmas Neu-Jazz Double Album", and quoted several paradoxes and reviews (for example, from The Wall Street Journal, calling it the "new standard by which all seasonal music must now be measured", or from Spin, giving the release 10 out of 10 points and calling it "[e]ssential year-round listening"). The poster text further states that the release will be sold as "compact disc" as well as "[l]imited edition prismatic hologram 6xLP on merlot and emerald semi-translucent 180 gram vinyl with original alternate-side etchings by Josh Tillman available till[sic] supplies last". The poster names five songs that are part of the track list: "Gesture I: Inoculation (Mother and Child)", "Gesture II: Feast of Spirits", "Anacrusis Future Seed", "Naked Fire/The Fifth Season" and "Gemini".

=== I Love You, Honeybear (2015–2016) ===
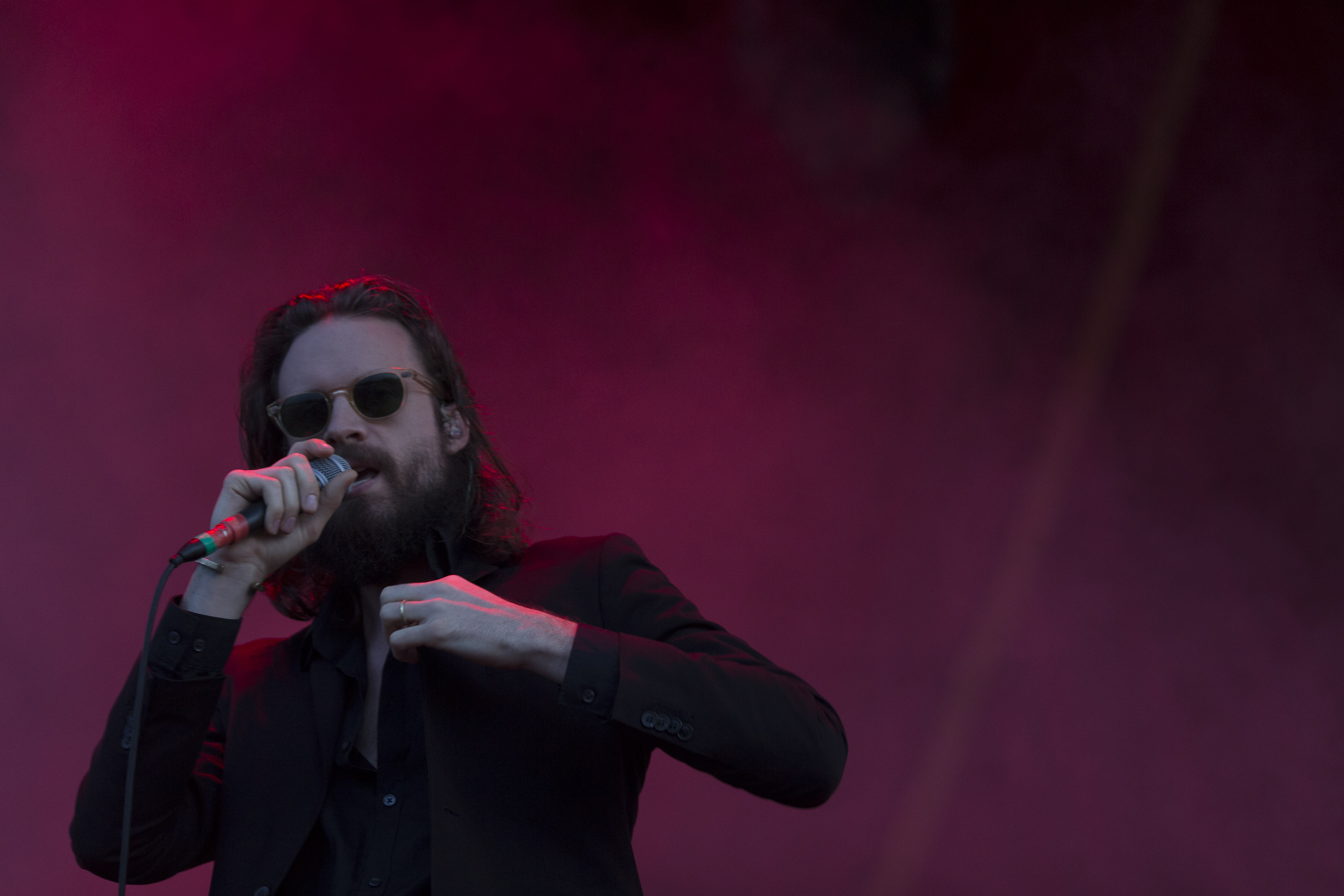
Tillman performing in 2015

The album I Love You, Honeybear was released in February 2015 to widespread acclaim. According to Tillman, it is a concept album about himself and his personal life. Tillman made headlines by covering Taylor Swift's "Blank Space" and "Welcome to New York" in 2015. He claimed to have never listened to the artist prior to recording the covers. This was done as a parody of Ryan Adams, who had released his own version of Swift's 1989, featuring covers of every song. Tillman released a new song titled "Real Love Baby" on May 19, 2016. He appeared on the song "Saturday Night Inside Out" on The Avalanches' second studio album Wildflower, which was released on July 1, 2016.

Tillman gained media attention on July 22, 2016, after walking off stage at XPoNential Music Festival in Camden, New Jersey, after twenty minutes into his planned fifty-minute performance. Instead of performing his setlist, Tillman walked out and asked, "What the fuck is going on?" He then talked for six minutes about the "numbing" role entertainment plays in our lives and how "stupidity just fucking runs the world because entertainment is stupid." When the audience applauded him he asked them not to and responded by saying, "Maybe just take a moment to be really fucking profoundly sad." He finally played a thirteen-minute piece from his then-upcoming album Pure Comedy called "Leaving LA" which references the frustrations he spoke of during his speech. Tillman then covered Leonard Cohen's "Bird on the Wire" before telling the crowd he loved them and walked off the stage, cutting his performance short. The following day, Tillman explained his performance in an Instagram post, in which he called Donald Trump's speech at the 2016 Republican National Convention a "demonic clown pageant coronation of our next potential Idiot King", which took place the night before Tillman's performance.

In September 2016, his voice and likeness were featured in Brad Neely's animated surreal comedy show Harg Nallin' Sclopio Peepio on Adult Swim. In the first-season finale episode "For Alba", he sings a song titled "This is America". The song features an animated Father John Misty singing what appears to be a humorous parody of his music, with lyrics most likely written by Brad Neely. The lyrics describe how Americans "die doing the dumbest of crap," such as riding unicycles, ghost hunting, and performing stunts while cosplaying as Batman. He also obsessively mentions Go-Gurts throughout the song.

=== Pure Comedy and God's Favorite Customer (2017–2020) ===
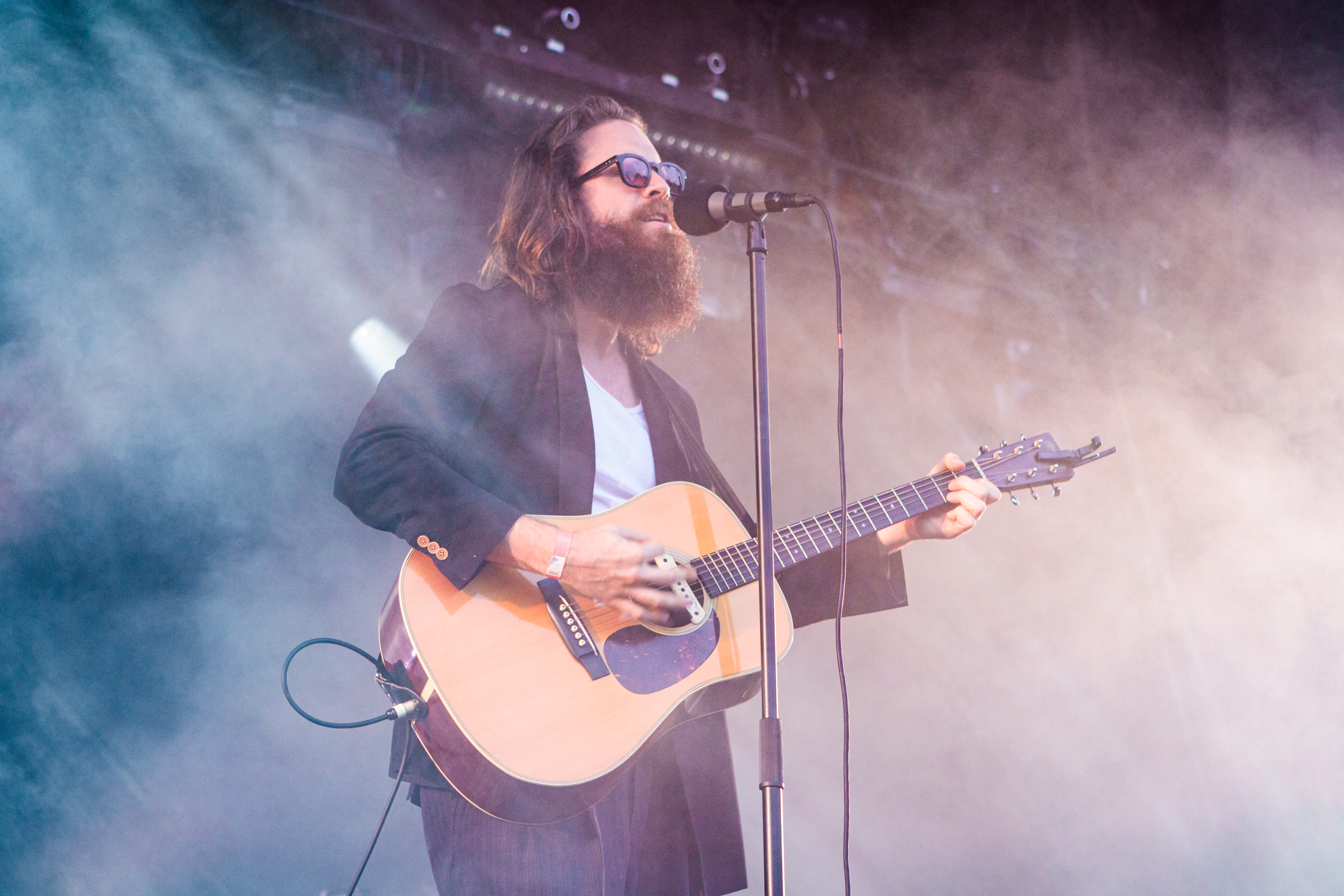
Tillman performing in 2019

On January 23, 2017, the title track from Misty's third studio album, Pure Comedy, was released with an accompanying music video. The second single released from Pure Comedy, "Two Wildly Different Perspectives", was released with another music video on January 30, 2017. The third single released was "Ballad of the Dying Man" on February 1, 2017. The fourth single, "Total Entertainment Forever", was released on the night it was performed on Saturday Night Live on March 4, 2017. Pure Comedy was released on April 7, 2017. The album sees Tillman externalize the stereotypical Father John Misty character that he developed through the two previous albums to prevent himself from being constricted to the character's image, using his personhood and experiences to expose his outlook on life. Additionally, Tillman produced the Gambles album Let Us Be in 2017.

The Pure Comedy World Tour began in April 2017 and continued into early 2018. During this tour, Tillman mixed the tracks for his next album produced with Jonathan Rado, revealing potential song titles "Mr. Tillman, Please Exit the Lobby" (later shortened to "Mr. Tillman"), "Ouch, I'm Drowning", "Well, We're Only People and There's Nothing Much We Can Do About It", and "Dum Dum Blues". The album explores heartache and was written during a six-week period where Tillman was living in a hotel. Tillman released the lead single, "Mr. Tillman", from God's Favorite Customer on February 20, 2018. The album was announced on April 18 and was released on June 1; its track listing was shared, alongside two further songs, "Disappointing Diamonds Are The Rarest Of Them All" and "Just Dumb Enough to Try".

British screenwriter and film producer Drew Pearce, who had previously directed the music video for "The Night Josh Tillman Came to Our Apartment", sought out Tillman for his directorial debut Hotel Artemis, when he wanted to cast a musician. Tillman has a small role in the film as a bank robber, and has said that his character "gets his head blown off within, like, 30 seconds." Tillman also contributed to the soundtrack of Hotel Artemis with the song "Gilded Cage", which was released on June 8, 2018, the same day as the film. The song has since been removed from streaming platforms for unknown reasons.

On March 23, 2020, Tillman released a live album titled Off-Key in Hamburg, which was recorded at the Hamburg Elbphilharmonie on August 8, 2019, on Bandcamp. All proceeds from the album go to the MusiCares COVID-19 Relief Fund. It has been described by NME as a "high-end luxury offering" and "immaculate".

=== Chloë and the Next 20th Century (2021–2023) ===
In December 2021, a spoken-word vinyl was mailed to fans by Bella Union. It was announced Father John Misty's fifth studio album, Chloë and the Next 20th Century, would be released on April 8, 2022, by Sub Pop and Bella Union. The album's eleven tracks were produced by Tillman and Jonathan Wilson. The album and its track listing were officially revealed on January 5, 2022, with its lead single "Funny Girl" released the same day. A second single from the album, "Q4", was released on February 9, 2022. A third, "Goodbye Mr Blue", was released on March 9, 2022. On April 4, 2022, "The Next 20th Century" was released as the fourth and final single to precede the album's release. The Father John Misty EP Live at Electric Lady was released on Sub Pop on September 15, 2022. It includes a cover of Stevie Wonder's "I Believe (When I Fall in Love It Will Be Forever)".

Tillman is featured on the track "Let the Light In" on Lana Del Rey's album Did You Know That There's a Tunnel Under Ocean Blvd.

=== Greatish Hits and Mahashmashana (2024–present) ===
In July 2024, Tillman released the single "I Guess Time Just Makes Fools of Us All", a different version of which he had first performed in 2019.

Initially promoted as the sole new track from a greatest hits compilation titled Greatish Hits: I Followed My Dreams and My Dreams Said to Crawl and released on August 16, 2024, the single was later revealed as the first offering from the studio album, Mahashmashana. The album, which was co-produced by Tillman and Drew Erickson with longtime collaborator Jonathan Wilson as executive producer, was released on November 22, and serves as Tillman's sixth studio album under the Father John Misty moniker. On September 17, Tillman released the album's second single, "Screamland", which features Low's Alan Sparhawk on guitar.

"She Cleans Up" was the next single released on October 15, 2024. Tour dates supporting Mahashmashana were also announced.

== Musical style ==
Tillman's musical style has been described as indie rock, indie folk, folk rock, chamber pop, soft rock, psychedelic rock, folk, and country.

== Personal life ==
Tillman met photographer Emma Elizabeth Garr after he moved to the Laurel Canyon neighborhood of Los Angeles in 2011. They were married in Big Sur in September 2013. They lived in New Orleans, but have since returned to Los Angeles. Garr had previously lived in Seattle for several years. She has taken photographs for his albums. In October 2024, he revealed that they have a child together.

Having been raised in an Evangelical Christian household, Tillman now openly criticizes religion in many of his songs. He has said that he is still "culturally Christian for all intents and purposes" but is troubled by the way Christianity is commonly expressed in the United States.

Tillman has struggled with depression, anxiety, and drug use. He stated in 2017 that he microdoses on LSD every day to alleviate his depression and anxiety. He has also stated that he has been diagnosed with PTSD by three separate therapists.

== Backing band ==
Current members

- Chris Dixie Darley – guitar, backing vocals (2012–present)
- Kyle Flynn – keyboards, piano, synthesizer, backing vocals (2012–present)
- David Vandervelde – guitar, keyboards, backing vocals, various instruments (2014–present)
- Eli Thomson – bass guitar, synthesizer (2014–present)
- Dan Bailey – drums (2014–present)
- Jon Titterington – piano, keyboards, backing vocals (2017–present)
- Tony Barba – saxophone, woodwinds (2022–present)

Former members

- Benji Lysaght – guitar (2012–2014)
- Jeff Ramuno – bass guitar (2012–2014)
- Aaron Sperske – drums (2012–2014)
- Kelly Pratt – horns, vibraphone, arrangements, conductor (2017–2022)

== Discography ==
Studio albums

as J. Tillman

- Untitled No. 1 (2003)
- I Will Return (2004)
- Long May You Run, J. Tillman (2006)
- Minor Works (2006)
- Cancer and Delirium (2007)
- Vacilando Territory Blues (2009)
- Year in the Kingdom (2009)
- Singing Ax (2010)

as Father John Misty

- Fear Fun (2012)
- I Love You, Honeybear (2015)
- Pure Comedy (2017)
- God's Favorite Customer (2018)
- Chloë and the Next 20th Century (2022)
- Mahashmashana (2024)

with Fleet Foxes

- Helplessness Blues (2011)

with Saxon Shore

- Be a Bright Blue (2002)
- Four Months of Darkness (2003)

== Awards and nominations ==
=== A2IM Libera Awards ===
Year	Nominee / work	Award	Result	Ref.
2015	Himself	Hardworking Artist of the Year	Nominated	
2015	I Love You, Honeybear	Album of the Year	Nominated	
2016	I Love You, Honeybear	Creative Packaging Award	Won	
2018	Pure Comedy	Creative Packaging Award	Nominated	
2018	Pure Comedy	Album of the Year	Nominated	
2018	Himself	Best Live Act	Nominated	

=== Berlin Music Video Awards ===
The Berlin Music Video Awards (BMVAs) are an annual festival that puts filmmakers and the art behind music videos in the spotlight.

Year	Nominee / work	Award	Result	Ref.
2017	"Things It Would Have Been Helpful to Know Before the Revolution"	Best Music Video	Nominated	
2017	"Things It Would Have Been Helpful to Know Before the Revolution"	Best Director	Nominated	

=== Grammy Awards ===
The Grammy Awards are awarded annually by the National Academy of Recording Arts and Sciences of the United States. Josh has received one win from four nominations.

Year	Nominee / work	Award	Result	Ref.
2012	Helplessness Blues	Best Folk Album	Nominated	
2016	I Love You, Honeybear (Limited Edition Deluxe Vinyl)	Best Boxed or Special Limited Edition Package	Nominated	
2018	Pure Comedy	Best Alternative Music Album	Nominated	
2018	Pure Comedy (Deluxe Edition)	Best Recording Package	Won	

=== mtvU Woodie Awards ===
Year	Nominee / work	Award	Result	Ref.
2013	"Hollywood Forever Cemetery Sings / Drive"	Best Video Woodie	Nominated	

=== NME Awards ===
Year	Nominee / work	Award	Result	Ref.
2018	Himself	Best International Solo Artist	Nominated	

=== Rober Awards Music poll ===
Year	Nominee / work	Award	Result	Ref.
2012	Himself	Best Songwriter	Nominated	
2015	Himself	Best Male Artist	Nominated	
2015	Himself	Best Songwriter	Nominated	
2017	Himself	Best Songwriter	Won	

=== Sweden GAFFA Awards ===
Delivered since 2010, the GAFFA Awards (Swedish: GAFFA Priset) are a Swedish award that rewards popular music awarded by the magazine of the same name.

Year	Nominee / work	Award	Result	Ref.
2019	Himself	Best Foreign Solo Act	Nominated	
2019	God's Favorite Customer	Best International Album	Nominated	

=== UK Music Video Awards ===
The UK Music Video Awards is an annual award ceremony founded in 2008 to recognize creativity, technical excellence and innovation in music videos and moving images for music. Tillman has received one award from two nominations.

Year	Nominee / work	Award	Result	Ref.
2017	"Things It Would Have Been Helpful to Know Before the Revolution"	Best Rock/Indie Video – International	Won	
2017	"Things It Would Have Been Helpful to Know Before the Revolution"	Best Animation	Nominated	

== Sources ==
- Simon, Scott (November 23, 2024). "Father John Misty discusses his new album 'Mahashmashana'". NPR.
