= Pure Comedy =

Studio album by Father John Misty
- Released: April 7, 2017
- Recorded: March 2016
- Studios: United Recording; Five Star Studios
- Genres: Indie folk; indie rock; baroque pop; orchestral folk
- Length: 74:17
- Labels: Bella Union; Sub Pop
- Producers: Jonathan Wilson; Josh Tillman

Father John Misty chronology
I Love You, Honeybear (2015)	Pure Comedy (2017)	God's Favorite Customer (2018)

Singles from Pure Comedy
- 1. "Pure Comedy" Released: January 23, 2017; 2. "Two Wildly Different Perspectives" Released: January 30, 2017; 3. "Ballad of the Dying Man" Released: February 1, 2017; 4. "Total Entertainment Forever" Released: March 4, 2017; 5. "Things It Would Have Been Helpful to Know Before the Revolution" Released: April 6, 2017

Pure Comedy is the third studio album by American folk musician Josh Tillman under his pseudonym Father John Misty. Its release was announced on January 23, 2017. It was released on April 7, 2017, on Bella Union in the UK and Europe and on Sub Pop in the rest of the world. This is Tillman's third studio album since his departure from Fleet Foxes. It was produced by Josh Tillman in collaboration with Jonathan Wilson, sound engineer Trevor Spencer and composer/double-bassist Gavin Bryars.

== Production ==
=== Songwriting ===
Most of Pure Comedy was written in 2015. It touches on themes of progress, technology, fame, the environment, politics, aging, social media, human nature, human connection and his own role in it all. Tillman included an 1800-word-long essay about its symbolism and meaning in the release announcement email to his fan club.

Pure Comedy is the story of a species born with a half-formed brain. The species’ only hope for survival, finding itself on a cruel, unpredictable rock surrounded by other species who seem far more adept at this whole thing (and to whom they are delicious), is the reliance on other, slightly older, half-formed brains. This reliance takes on a few different names as their story unfolds, like “love,” “culture,” “family,” etc. Over time, and as their brains prove to be remarkably good at inventing meaning where there is none, the species becomes the purveyor of increasingly bizarre and sophisticated ironies. These ironies are designed to help cope with the species’ loathsome vulnerability and to try and reconcile how disproportionate their imagination is to the monotony of their existence.

=== Recording ===
Pure Comedy was recorded in March 2016 at United Recording Studios in Los Angeles. Its basic tracking and vocals were recorded live, in no more than two takes each. It was mixed by Tillman, Wilson and sound engineer Trevor Spencer, and mastered by Bob Ludwig at Gateway Mastering Studios. Featured instruments include strings and horns. Bryars, along with additional contributors Nico Muhly and Thomas Bartlett, provided choral arrangements.

== Promotion ==
=== Short film ===
In light of the album announcement, Tillman released his 25-minute short film Pure Comedy: The Film, captured by a six-person room throughout the recording of the album. He co-directed with Grant James. It is a monochromatic depiction of the live tracking and Tillman's writing process.

=== Singles ===
The single "Pure Comedy" was released on January 23, 2017, with a music video animated by Matthew Daniel Siskin featuring snippets of popular Internet videos.

The album's second single, "Two Wildly Different Perspectives", was released with a music video also animated by Siskin, and also containing popular videoclips, on January 30, 2017.

The third single released was "Ballad of the Dying Man" on February 1, 2017.

The fourth single, "Total Entertainment Forever", was released on the night it was performed on Saturday Night Live (along with "Pure Comedy") on March 4, 2017.

=== Other music videos ===
On April 26, 2017, a music video produced by Adam Green was released for "Total Entertainment Forever". It features a crucified Macaulay Culkin as Kurt Cobain seen in a virtual reality world pictured in papier-mâché.

Jacknife Films, a production company best known for their work on Radiohead's "Burn the Witch" and Run the Jewels's "Don't Get Captured" music videos, took on the project of a music video for "Things It Would Have Been Helpful To Know Before the Revolution" that was released on August 3, 2017.

=== Pure Comedy world tour ===
The Pure Comedy world tour, initially meant to be in the form of a musical, began in April 2017 and continued until early 2018.

== Critical reception ==
Professional ratings
Aggregate scores
Source	Rating
AnyDecentMusic?	8.0/10
Metacritic	85/100
Review scores
Source	Rating
AllMusic	4/5 stars
The A.V. Club	B+
Entertainment Weekly	B+
The Guardian	5/5 stars
The Independent	4/5 stars
Mojo	5/5 stars
NME	5/5 stars
Pitchfork	7.6/10
Q	4/5 stars
Rolling Stone	4/5 stars

Pure Comedy received acclaim from critics. On Metacritic, which assigns a normalized rating out of 100 to reviews from mainstream publications, the album received an average score of 85, based on 36 reviews, which signifies "universal acclaim". A review from The Record Store Clerk remarked that "Pure Comedy (shows) a mature artist proving that he can continue to make music at the top of his game and likely will for years to come." In a highly positive review for Chorus.fm, Aaron Mook writes, "Pure Comedy is a gorgeous album, an album that will remain important in the context of Tillman’s career, but above all things, it's a genuine album. Sometimes, it’s hard to empathize with someone who refuses to tell you what you want to hear – especially if what they’re saying is true." Writing for No Depression, John Amen also offered high praise, calling Pure Comedy Tillman's "most ambitious, cohesive, and provocative release to date."

However, the album did divide some critics. No Ripcord gave the album a 4/10, saying "One of the most frustrating releases of recent times. Tracks meander insipidly, crushed by the weight of a solipsistic 'message' and the real moments of quality only serve as a reminder of what might have been." Spin stated, "He’s not really in a fun mood, and the music follows. The lushness has diminished, and the work evokes increasing comparisons to ‘70s singer-songwriters like Randy Newman and Harry Nilsson, who hid their acidic commentary within sturdy pop structures."

Pure Comedy received nominations for Best Alternative Music Album and Best Recording Package for its deluxe edition at the 60th Grammy Awards, winning the latter in a tie with Magín Díaz' El Orisha de la Rosa.

=== Accolades ===
Publication	Accolade	Rank	Ref.
Drowned in Sound	Favourite Albums of 2017	71	
Exclaim!	Top 20 Pop & Rock Albums of 2017	11	
Loud and Quiet	Top 40 Albums of 2017	23	
NME	NME's Albums of the Year 2017	4	
New York Daily News	The 25 Best Albums of 2017	17	
Riot Mag	Riot's Albums of the Year 2017	8	
Rolling Stone	50 Best Albums of 2017	19	
Rough Trade	Albums of the Year 2017	23	
Stereogum	The 50 Best Albums of 2017	22	
The Skinny	The Skinny's Top 50 Albums of 2017	50	
The Sunday Times	100 Best Albums of the Year	1	
Uncut	75 Best Albums of 2017	13	
Uproxx	All The Best Albums of 2017	5	
Vinyl Me, Please	The 30 Best Albums of 2017	4	

== Commercial performance ==
Pure Comedy debuted at number 10 on the Billboard 200 with 35,000 album-equivalent units, of which 33,000 were pure album sales.

== Track listing ==
All tracks are written by Josh Tillman.

No.	Title	Length
1.	"Pure Comedy"	6:23
2.	"Total Entertainment Forever"	2:53
3.	"Things It Would Have Been Helpful to Know Before the Revolution"	4:18
4.	"Ballad of the Dying Man"	4:50
5.	"Birdie"	5:19
6.	"Leaving LA"	13:11
7.	"A Bigger Paper Bag"	4:41
8.	"When the God of Love Returns There'll Be Hell to Pay"	4:04
9.	"Smoochie"	3:45
10.	"Two Wildly Different Perspectives"	3:12
11.	"The Memo"	5:16
12.	"So I'm Growing Old on Magic Mountain"	9:58
13.	"In Twenty Years or So"	6:27
Total length:		74:17

== Personnel ==
Performance

- Josh Tillman – vocals, guitar, drums, percussion, etc. (all tracks)
- Jonathan Wilson – keyboards, guitars, piano, drums, percussion, backing vocals, vibraphone, samples (tracks 1–3, 5, 7, 8, 10–13)
- Thomas Bartlett – piano, keyboards (tracks 1–4, 7–9, 12, 13)
- Elijah Thomson – bass (tracks 1–4, 7, 9, 11–13)
- Daniel Bailey – drums, percussion (tracks 1–5, 7, 9, 11–13)
- Keefus Ciancia – keyboards, samples (tracks 1–4, 7–9, 12)
- Kyle Flynn – electric guitar (track 9)

Production

- Jonathan Wilson – production, mixing
- Josh Tillman – production, mixing
- Trevor Spencer – mixing, engineering
- Vira Byramji – additional engineering
- Dave Cerminara – additional engineering
- Rouble Kapoor – additional engineering
- Bryce Gonzales – additional engineering
- Bob Ludwig – mastering

Design

- Ed Steed – illustrations, art direction
- Sasha Barr – art direction, additional art and designs
- Josh Tillman – art direction

Arrangement

- Gavin Bryars – horn arrangement (track 1), string arrangement (track 6)
- James King – horn arrangement (tracks 2, 3), additional horn arrangement (track 1)
- Josh Tillman – horn arrangement (track 2), additional horn arrangement (track 1), vocal arrangement (tracks 4, 12)
- Paul Jacob Cartwright – string arrangement (tracks 1, 3, 10)
- Tom Lea – string arrangement (track 5)
- Nico Muhly – string arrangement (track 13)
- Chavonne Stewart – vocal arrangement (track 4)

Additional musicians

- George Potts Young – additional vocals (track 4)
- De'Ante Duckett – additional vocals (track 4)
- Ryan Stewart – additional vocals (track 4)
- Tiffanie Cross – additional vocals (track 4)
- Vanessa Grundy – additional vocals (track 4)
- Chavvone Stewart – additional vocals (tracks 4, 12)
- Shanika Bereal – additional vocals (track 4)
- Celeste Young – additional vocals (track 4)
- Dominique Dubose – additional vocals (track 4)
- Greg Leisz – pedal steel (track 9), lap steel (track 12)
- Kelsey Lu – cello (track 11)
- Gavin Bryars – vibraphone (track 12)

== Charts ==
Pure Comedy reached the first position on the Billboard Rock Albums, Alternative Music, and Folk Music charts on the week of April 29, 2017, a first for Tillman.

=== Weekly charts ===
Chart (2017)	Peak position
Australian Albums (ARIA)	14
Belgian Albums (Ultratop Flanders)	25
Belgian Albums (Ultratop Wallonia)	64
Canadian Albums (Billboard)	21
Danish Albums (Hitlisten)	32
Dutch Albums (Album Top 100)	16
French Albums (SNEP)	121
German Albums (Offizielle Top 100)	60
Irish Albums (IRMA)	7
New Zealand Albums (RMNZ)	37
Portuguese Albums (AFP)	10
Scottish Albums (Official Charts)	7
Spanish Albums (PROMUSICAE)	36
Swedish Albums (Sverigetopplistan)	18
Swiss Albums (Schweizer Hitparade)	32
UK Albums (Official Charts)	8
US Billboard 200	10
US Top Rock Albums (Billboard)	1

=== Year-end charts ===
Chart (2017)	Position
US Top Rock Albums (Billboard)	91
