= Angel Olsen discography =

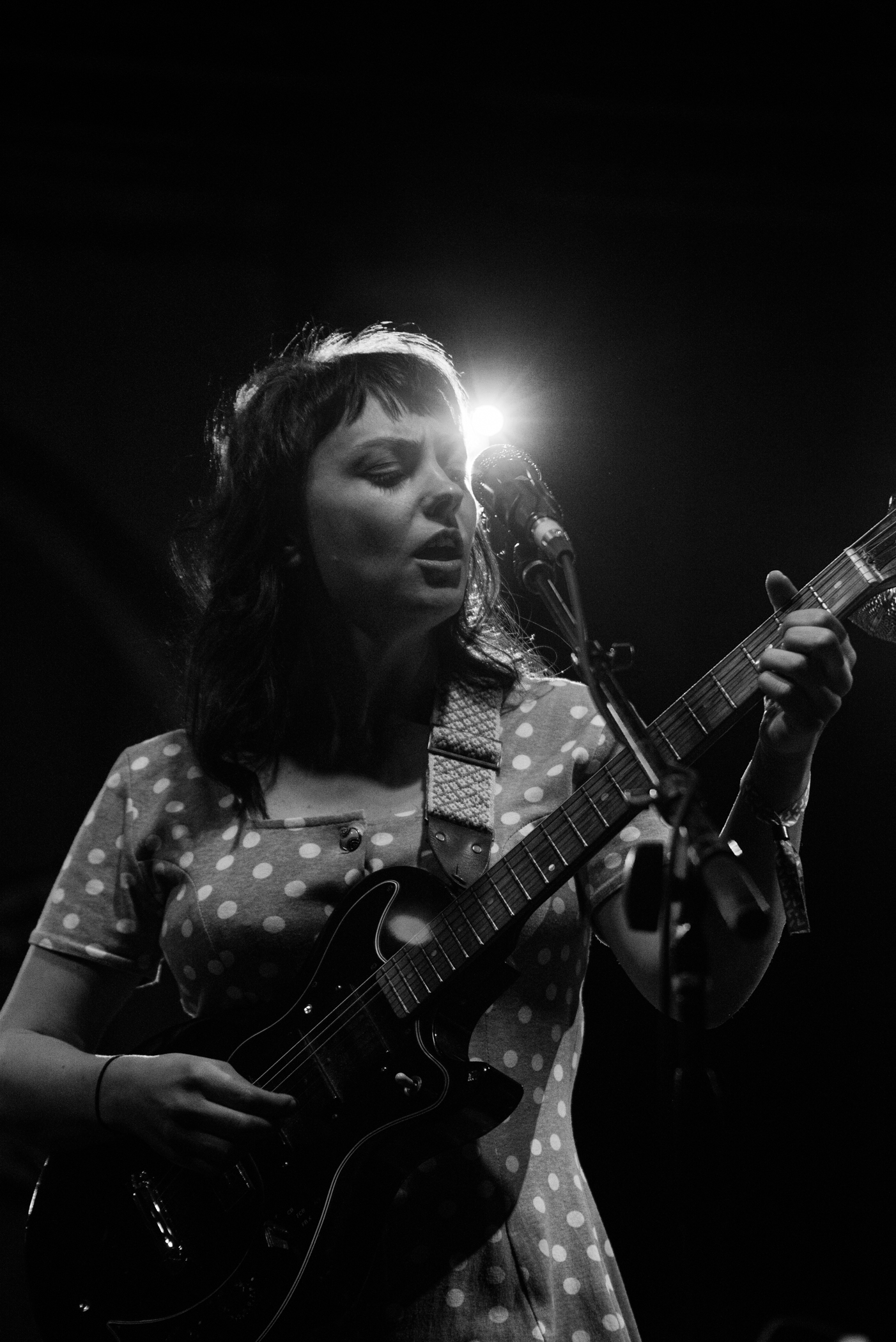
- Angel Olsen performing in 2017
- Studio albums: 6
- EPs: 5
- Compilation albums: 2
- Singles: 8
- Collaborative album: 1

The discography of American singer-songwriter Angel Olsen consists of six studio albums, one collaborative album, two compilation albums, five extended plays, and eight singles.

== Albums ==
=== Studio albums ===
List of studio albums, with selected chart positions
Title	Album details	Peak chart positions									
Title	Album details	US	AUS	BEL (FL)	FRA	GER	IRE	POR	SPA	SWI	UK
Half Way Home	Released: September 4, 2012; Label: Bathetic; Formats: CD, LP, digital download	—	—	—	—	—	—	—	—	—	—
Burn Your Fire for No Witness	Released: February 18, 2014; Label: Jagjaguwar; Formats: CD, LP, cassette, digital download	71	—	81	146	—	—	—	—	—	64
My Woman	Released: September 2, 2016; Label: Jagjaguwar; Formats: CD, LP, cassette, digital download	47	29	36	185	—	43	38	84	58	40
All Mirrors	Released: October 4, 2019; Label: Jagjaguwar; Formats: CD, LP, cassette, digital download	52	27	46	199	74	49	13	69	62	28
Whole New Mess	Released: August 28, 2020; Label: Jagjaguwar; Formats: CD, LP, cassette, digital download	— (Note: Whole New Mess did not enter the Billboard 200, but did peak at number 27 on the Top Album Sales chart.)	—	—	—	—	—	38	—	98	— (Note: Whole New Mess did not enter the UK Albums Chart but peaked at number 37 on the UK Album Sales Chart.)
Big Time	Released: June 3, 2022; Label: Jagjaguwar; Formats: CD, LP, digital download	121	40	26	—	46	69	—	—	39	24

=== Collaborative albums ===
List of collaborative albums
Title	Details
Tim Kinsella Sings the Songs of Marvin Tate by Leroy Bach Featuring Angel Olsen (with Tim Kinsella, Martin Tate and Leroy Bach)	Released: December 2013; Label: Joyful Noise; Format: LP

=== Compilation albums ===
List of compilation albums
Title	Details	Peak chart positions						
Title	Details	US Current	US Folk	US Ind.	US Rock	UK Amer.	UK Indie	UK Sales
Phases	Released: November 10, 2017; Label: Jagjaguwar; Formats: CD, LP, digital download	57	7	9	46	4	7	98
Song of the Lark and Other Far Memories	Released: May 7, 2021; Label: Jagjaguwar; Formats: LP, box set, digital download	90	—	—	—	—	—	—

== Extended plays ==
List of extended plays
Title	Details	Peak chart positions	
Title	Details	US Sales	UK Vinyl
Strange Cacti	Released: July 2010; Label: Bathetic; Formats: LP, cassette, digital download	—	—
Lady of the Waterpark	Released: September 2010; Label: Love Lion; Format: Cassette	—	—
Sleepwalker	Released: January 15, 2013; Label: Sixteen Tambourines; Format: 7"	—	—
Aisles	Released: August 20, 2021; Label: Jagjaguwar; Format: LP, cassette, digital download	62	—
Forever Means	Released: April 14, 2023; Label: Jagjaguwar; Format: LP, digital download	97	2

== Singles ==
=== As lead artist ===
List of singles, showing year released and album name
Title	Year	Peak chart positions			Album
Title	Year	US AAA	MEX	UK Sales	Album
"Sweet Dreams" / "California"	2013	—	—	—	Sleepwalker
"Forgiven/Forgotten"	2013	—	—	—	Burn Your Fire for No Witness
"Hi-Five"	2014	—	—	—	Burn Your Fire for No Witness
"Windows"	2014	—	—	—	Burn Your Fire for No Witness
"Intern"	2016	—	—	—	My Woman
"Shut Up, Kiss Me"	2016	22	38	—	My Woman
"Sister"	2016	—	—	—	My Woman
"Fly On Your Wall"	2017	—	—	—	Phases
"Special"	2017	—	—	—	Phases
"Sans"	2017	—	—	—	Phases
"All Mirrors"	2019	—	—	—	All Mirrors
"Lark"	2019	—	—	—	All Mirrors
"Whole New Mess"	2020	—	—	—	Whole New Mess
"Waving, Smiling"	2020	—	—	—	Whole New Mess
"It's Every Season (Whole New Mess)"	2021	—	—	—	Songs for the Lark and Other Far Memories
"Alive and Dying (Waving, Smiling)"	2021	—	—	—	Songs for the Lark and Other Far Memories
" Like I Used To" (with Sharon Van Etten)	2021	26	—	—	Non-album single
"Gloria"	2021	—	—	—	Aisles
"Safety Dance"	2021	—	—	—	Aisles
"Something on Your Mind"	2022	—	—	9	Non-album single
"All the Good Times"	2022	—	—	—	Big Time
"Big Time" (solo or with Sturgill Simpson)	2022	32	—	—	Big Time
"Through the Fires"	2022	—	—	—	Big Time
"Nothing's Free"	2023	—	—	—	Forever Means
"Forever Means"	2023	—	—	3	Forever Means
"Greenville" (Lucinda Williams cover)	2023	—	—	—	Non-album single
"—" denotes a recording that did not chart or was not released in that territory.

=== As featured artist ===
List of collaborations, showing year released and album name
Title	Year	Album
"California Paranoia" (Lawrence Rothman featuring Angel Olsen)	2015	The Book of Law
"Heartstruck (Wild Hunger)" (Hamilton Leithauser featuring Angel Olsen)	2017	Non-album single
"Safe in the Car" (Jeff Ament featuring Angel Olsen)	2018	Heaven/Hell

== Guest appearances ==
=== With Bonnie "Prince" Billy ===
- Island Brothers (Vinyl 10"), February 2011, Drag City Records
- Wolfroy Goes to Town (CD/LP), October 2011, Drag City Records
- Now Here's My Plan (CD/LP), July 2012, Drag City Records

List of guest appearances, with other performing artists, showing year released and album name
Title	Year	Other performer(s)	Album
"If It's Alive, It Will"	2011	—N/a	Deep In The Woods: An Introduction to Bathetic Records
"In the Morning"	2011	—N/a	Twosyllable Records Chicago Cassette Compilation
"Acrobat"	2012	—N/a	Miracle of Love: A Bathetic Records Compilation
"The Blacksmith"	2015	—N/a	Shirley Inspired
"Attics of My Life"	2016	—N/a	Day of the Dead
"Oblivion"	2016	Chilvarous Amoekons, Will Oldham	Fanatic Voyage
"Dance With Me"	2017	Jaye Bartell	"Dance With Me / Slow Going" — Single
"Fly On Your Wall"	2017	—N/a	Our First 100 Days
"Stranger's Kiss"	2017	Alex Cameron	Forced Witness
"Red Rocks"	2017	High Aura'd	No River Long Enough Doesn't Contain a Bend
"Give Erin a Compliment"	2017	Jaye Bartell	In a Time of Trouble a Wild Exultation
"Who's Sorry Now"	2017	—N/a	Resistance Radio: The Man in the High Castle Album
"True Blue"	2019	Mark Ronson	Late Night Feelings

== Videography ==
List of music videos, showing year released and director
Title	Year	Director(s)
"Tiniest Seed"	2013	Angel Olsen; Randy Sterling Hunter; Ashley Connor; Zia Anger
"Forgive/Forgotten"	2013	Zia Anger
"High & Wild"	2014	—N/a
"Hi-Five"	2014	Zia Anger
"Windows"	2014	Rick Alverson
"Intern"	2016	Angel Olsen
"Shut Up Kiss Me"	2016	Angel Olsen
"Sister"	2016	Angel Olsen; Conor Hagen
"Pops"	2017	Angel Olsen; Jethro Waters
"Special"	2017	Angel Olsen
"All Mirrors"	2019	Ashley Connor
"Lark"	2019	Ashley Connor
"Whole New Mess"	2020	Ashley Connor
"All the Good Times"	2022	Kimberly Stuckwisch
"Big Time"	2022	Kimberly Stuckwisch
"Through the Fires"	2022	Kimberly Stuckwisch
