= Fanfare (Jonathan Wilson album) =

Studio album by Jonathan Wilson
- Released: 2013
- Recorded: 2012 at Fivestarstudios, Los Angeles, California
- Genre: Folk, Psychedelic
- Length: 78:12
- Label: Bella Union
- Producer: Jonathan Wilson

Fanfare is the second studio album released by LA-based artist Jonathan Wilson. It was released in 2013 on the British indie label Bella Union. The album was recorded at Wilson's studio Five Star Studios in Laurel Canyon, Los Angeles.

== Overview ==
The album was recorded over a period of nine months, at Wilson's studio located in Laurel Canyon. Similar to his previous album Gentle Spirit, Wilson continued to collaborate with numerous artists such as Roy Harper, David Crosby, Graham Nash, Benmont Tench, Father John Misty, Patrick Sansone, Dawes among others. Prior to recording the album, Wilson set out to find a grand piano, which was to serve as the centerpiece and main feature on the album and help to achieve a more epic sound than previous. Wilson found a Steinway Grand Piano for sale on Craigslist and was lucky enough to convince the seller for him to rent it for about nine months.

Fanfare features all original Wilson compositions, with the exception of his rendition of Sopwith Camel's "Fazon".

== Track listing ==
All songs written by Jonathan Wilson (except where noted).

1. "Fanfare" – 7:06
2. "Dear Friend" – 7:16
3. "Her Hair is Growing Long" – 4:53 - additional lyrics by Jacqueline Suskin
4. "Love to Love" – 4:10
5. "Future Vision" – 5:55
6. "Moses Pain" – 6:39
7. "Cecil Taylor" – 6:31
8. "Illumination" – 6:39
9. "Desert Trip" – 4:26
10. "Fazon" – 5:38 - (Sopwith Camel cover) - written by Peter Kraemer, Terry MacNeil, Martin Beard and Norman Mayell
11. "New Mexico" – 6:41 - lyrics by Roy Harper
12. "Lovestrong" – 6:32
13. "All the Way Down" – 5:55

== Personnel ==
"Fanfare"

- Jonathan Wilson – Drums, Bass, Piano, Fender Rhodes, Mellotron, Millennium bells, Hammond Organ, Vibes, Percussion and Vocals
- Keefus Ciancia - Moog synthesizers
- James King - Saxophone
- Nate Walcott - Flugelhorn

"Dear Friend"

- Jonathan Wilson – Bass, Electric Guitar, Mellotron, Vibes and Vocals
- Richard Gowen – Drums
- Jason Borger - Hammond Organ and Piano
- Omar Velasco - Electric Guitar

"Her Hair Is Growing Long"

- Jonathan Wilson - Guitars, Bass, Drums, Percussion, Hammond Organ, Synthesizer and Vocals

"Love To Love"

- Jonathan Wilson - 6 string and 12 string Electric Guitars, Acoustic Guitar, Piano, Percussion and Vocals
- Richard Gowen - Drums
- Dan Horne - Bass
- Omar Velasco - Guitar
- Jason Borger - Hammond Organ

"Future Vision"

- Jonathan Wilson - Drums, Bass, Electric Guitar, Acoustic 12 string Guitars, Piano, Hammond Organ, Synthesizers, Clavinet and Vocals
- Josh Tillman - Harmony Vocals
- Gabriel Noel - Cello

"Moses Pain"

- Jonathan Wilson - Bass, Acoustic Guitar, Harmonica, Vibes and Vocals
- Richard Gowen - Drums and Percussion
- Mike Campell - Slide Guitar
- Benmont Tench - Piano
- Jason Borger - Hammond Organ
- Jackson Browne, Graham Nash, Josh Tillman and Jenny O. - Harmony Singers

"Cecil Taylor"

- Jonathan Wilson - Guitars, Bass, Piano, Hammond Organ, Drums, Percussion and Vocals
- Nate Walcott - Flugelhorn
- David Crosby - Vocal Solo and Harmony Vocals
- Graham Nash - Harmony Vocals

"Illumination"

- Jonathan Wilson - Drums, Bass, Electric Guitars, Piano, Percussion, Hammond Organ and Vocals

"Desert Trip"

- Jonathan Wilson - Acoustic Guitar, Percussion and Vocals
- Richard Gowen - Drums
- Omar Velasco - Nashville Guitar
- Gabriel Noel - Upright Bass
- Jason Borger - Piano and Mellotron
- Josh Tillman - Velvet Vocal Pillows
- Jackson Browne - Ending Vocals

"Fazon"

- Jonathan Wilson - Drums, Bass, Guitars, Piano, Mellotron, Bicycle Wheel and Vocals
- James King - Saxophone
- Farmer Dave Scher - Harmony Vocals

"New Mexico"

- Jonathan Wilson - Drums, Bass Guitars, Organ, Dulcimer, Percussion and Vocals
- Omar Velasco - Harmony Vocals
- James King - Flute

"Lovestrong"

- Jonathan Wilson - Electric Guitar, Organ, Clavinet, Synthesizer and Vocals
- Richard Gowen - Drums
- Dan Horne - Bass
- Omar Velasco - Mellotron
- Benmont Tench - Piano
- Gabriel Noel - Cello

"All The Way Down"

- Jonathan Wilson - Acoustic Guitar, Piano, Percussion, Vibes, Mellotron, Stratocaster and Vocals
- Richard Owen - Drums
- Dan Horne - Bass
- Omar Velasco - Electric Guitar
- Bryce Gonzales - Chamber Radio
- Patrick Sansone - Strings Arranged and Conducted

== Production credits ==
- Produced and Recorded by Jonathan Wilson at Fivestarstudios in Los Angeles
- Engineered by Bryce Gonzales
- Mixed by Jonathan Wilson and Bryce Gonzales at Groovemasters Studio in Santa Monica, California; Assisted by Bil Lane and Rich Tosi with the help of Ed Wong and Eddie Santos Groove Masters
- Mastered by JJ Golden at Golden Mastering in Ventura, California
