= Grace Cummings =

Australian singer-songwriter and actor

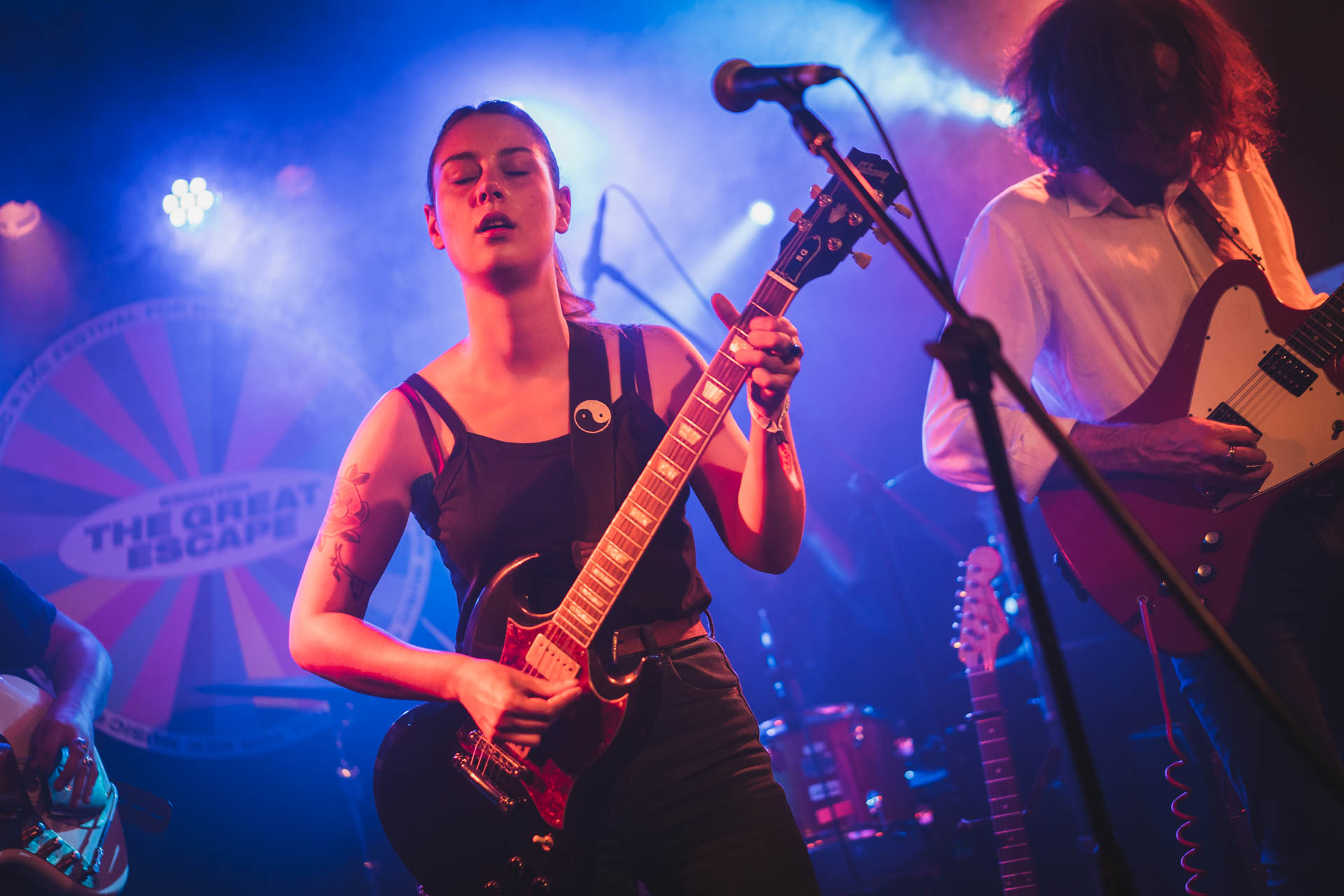
- Grace Cummings in 2022

Background information
- Occupations: Musician; singer; songwriter
- Instruments: Guitar; vocals; keyboards
- Years active: 2019–present
- Labels: Flightless; ATO

Grace Cummings is an Australian singer-songwriter and stage actor. She has released four studio albums: Refuge Cove (2019), Storm Queen (2022), Ramona (2024), and Bloodhorse! (2026).

== Early life and education ==
Grace Cummings grew up in Melbourne. Her father is of Irish descent, and her mother's family is Sicilian.

She attended drama school.

== Career ==
=== Music ===
Cummings began her musical career as a drummer, later becoming a self-taught guitar player. She was signed by Melbourne record label Flightless after founder Eric Moore attended one of her live shows. Flightless released her debut album, Refuge Cove, in 2019. The nine-track album blended acoustic folk and blues and featured Cummings playing acoustic guitar. It was launched at the Tote Hotel and toured, with Cummings supporting international artists including Weyes Blood, Evan Dando, and J Mascis. Cummings received a Music Victoria Awards nomination for Best Breakthrough Act in 2020.

In 2021, Cummings signed a worldwide deal with ATO Records. Her second album, Storm Queen, was released in 2022. It was written and recorded during the COVID pandemic, and Cummings said that this influenced the album's simplicity. It was self-produced and featured more instrumentation than her previous record, including accompaniment by the tambourine, theremin and fiddle. The lyrics explored themes such as destruction in the natural world and the possibility of the existence of a higher power.

Cummings released her third album, Ramona, in 2024. She worked with producer Jonathan Wilson and recorded the album in Wilson's Topanga Canyon studio In interviews, Cummings has stated she reached out to Wilson after hearing his work with Angel Olsen. The album is named after a character in Bob Dylan's song "To Ramona", and Cummings has described the work as "dramatic". Ramona features strings, horns, and piano. Harpist Mary Lattimore and multi-instrumentalist Drew Erikson contributed to the record.

Cummings' fourth studio album, Bloodhorse! was released on 14 August 2026 through Virgin Music Group.

=== Acting ===
Cummings has performed in Australian theatre. In 2018, she appeared in a production of Prehistoric at the Meat Market in North Melbourne. The play centred on the Australian punk scene, and Cummings played live music as part of the show.

She starred as Charlotte in a Melbourne Theatre Company production of Berlin in 2021. The role was as a German woman, and Cummings was the co-lead. Cummings has described theatre as the form she's been involved in for most of her creative life, and has said she'd love to do more.

== Influences, style, and reception ==
Cummings' musical influences include Irish folk music, Townes Van Zandt, Bob Dylan, and Lucinda Williams.

She is known for her unusual singing voice, which has been described as "commanding and magnetic", powerful, and as having a "devastating force".

== Discography ==
List of albums with selected details
Title	Album details	Peak chart positions
Title	Album details	AUS
Refuge Cove	Released: 1 November 2019; Label: Flightless; Format: Vinyl	—
Storm Queen	Released: 14 January 2022; Label: ATO Records; Format: Vinyl, CD, digital download	—
Ramona	Released: 5 April 2024; Label: ATO Records; Format: Vinyl, CD, digital download	—
Bloodhorse!	Released: 14 August 2026; Label: Virgin Music Group; Format: Vinyl, digital	23

== Awards and nominations ==
=== APRA Music Awards ===
The APRA Music Awards were established by Australasian Performing Right Association (APRA) in 1982 to honour the achievements of songwriters and music composers, and to recognise their song writing skills, sales and airplay performance, by its members annually.

Year	Nominee / work	Award	Result	Ref.
2025	"A Precious Thing"	Song of the Year	Shortlisted	
2025	Grace Cummings	Emerging Songwriter of the Year	Nominated	

=== Australian Music Prize ===
The Australian Music Prize (the AMP) is an annual award of $50,000 given to an Australian band or solo artist in recognition of the merit of an album released during the year of award. They commenced in 2005.

Year	Nominee / work	Award	Result	Ref.
2024	Ramona	Australian Music Prize	Nominated	
2026	Bloodhorse!	Australian Music Prize	Nominated	
