= Eat the Worm =

Studio album by Jonathan Wilson
- Released: September 8, 2023
- Length: 50:08
- Label: BMG
- Producer: Jonathan Wilson

Jonathan Wilson chronology
Dixie Blur (2020)	Eat the Worm (2023)

Eat the Worm is the fifth studio album by American musician and producer Jonathan Wilson. It was released on September 8, 2023, through BMG Rights Management. It was influenced by the works of Jim Pembroke, and received positive reviews from critics.

== Critical reception ==
Professional ratings
Aggregate scores
Source	Rating
Metacritic	79/100
Review scores
Source	Rating
AllMusic	4/5 stars
American Songwriter	3.5/5 stars
Classic Rock	4/5 stars
Mojo	4/5 stars
Uncut	7/10

Eat the Worm received a score of 79 out of 100 on review aggregator Metacritic based on five critics' reviews, indicating "generally favorable" reception. Classic Rock described it as a modest masterpiece", Mojo remarked that "stylistic Easter eggs confound and delight", while Uncut called it "weird but oddly wonderful".

Thom Jurek of AllMusic deemed it "a showcase for a musician seeking to liberate himself from things he already knows" and wrote that it "feels like Harry Nilsson and Randy Newman writing, recording, and drinking heavily in a late-night studio session. The lyrics are voluminous and framed by loopy, expansive production." Hal Horowitz of American Songwriter summarized Eat the Worm as a "sprawling, 12-song, 51-minute opus that, at least occasionally, will test the most open-minded listener", also comparing Wilson's "laid-back voice" to Nilsson's.

== Track listing ==
Eat the Worm track listing
No.	Title	Length
1.	"Marzipan"	5:15
2.	"Bonamossa"	4:27
3.	"Ol' Father Time"	3:36
4.	"Hollywood Vape"	2:46
5.	"The Village Is Dead"	2:52
6.	"Wim Hof"	3:23
7.	"Lo and Behold"	3:11
8.	"Charlie Parker"	6:13
9.	"Hey Love"	2:53
10.	"B.F.F."	5:19
11.	"East LA"	5:05
12.	"Ridin' in a Jag"	5:08
Total length:		50:08

== Charts ==
Chart performance for Eat the Worm
Chart (2023)	Peak position
Scottish Albums (OCC)	96
UK Independent Albums (OCC)	24
