= Pitchfork Music Festival 2017 =

Music festival

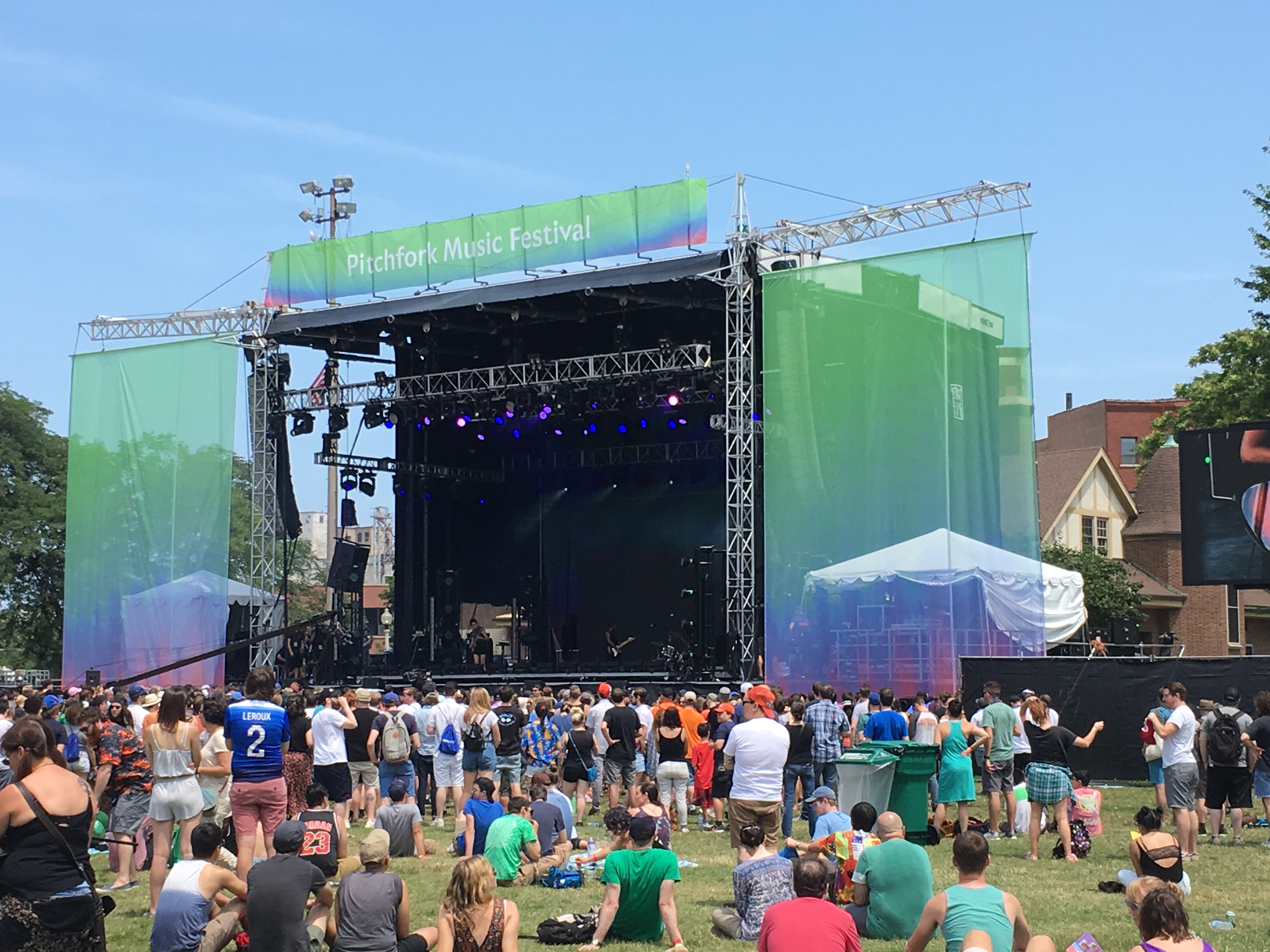
- Dates: July 14–16, 2017
- Locations: Union Park, Chicago, United States
- Website: pitchforkmusicfestival.com

The Pitchfork Music Festival 2017 was held on July 14 to 16, 2017 at the Union Park, Chicago, United States. The festival was headlined by LCD Soundsystem, Solange and A Tribe Called Quest. The festival marked A Tribe Called Quest's first full live concert since the death of founding member Phife Dawg.

== Lineup ==
Headline performers are listed in boldface. Artists listed from latest to earliest set times.

Green
Friday, July 14	Saturday, July 15	Sunday, July 16
**LCD Soundsystem**; Danny Brown; Vince Staples; Priests	**A Tribe Called Quest**; Angel Olsen; George Clinton & Parliament-Funkadelic; Weyes Blood; Vagabon	**Solange**; Jamila Woods (Note: Jamila Woods was initially set to perform at the Blue Stage. Then, The Avalanches cancelled their performance due to illness. As a result, Woods replaced them to perform at the Green Stage.); Hamilton Leithauser; NE-HI; Kilo Kish

Red
Friday, July 14	Saturday, July 15	Sunday, July 16
Dirty Projectors; Thurston Moore Group; Hiss Golden Messenger; Madame Gandhi	PJ Harvey; The Feelies; Arab Strap; Jeff Rosenstock	Nicolás Jaar; Ride; Isaiah Rashad; Colin Stetson

Blue
Friday, July 14	Saturday, July 15	Sunday, July 16
Arca; Kamaiyah; Frankie Cosmos; William Tyler; Dawn Richard	S U R V I V E Madlib; Francis and the Lights; Mitski; Cherry Glazerr	American Football; Pinegrove; Joey Purp; Derrick Carter
