= All Mirrors =

Studio album by Angel Olsen
- Released: October 4, 2019
- Studio: Sargent Recorders (Los Angeles, California)
- Genre: Art pop
- Length: 48:33
- Label: Jagjaguwar
- Producer: John Congleton; Angel Olsen

Angel Olsen chronology
| Phases (2017) | All Mirrors (2019) | Whole New Mess (2020) |

Angel Olsen studio album chronology
| My Woman (2016) | All Mirrors (2019) | Big Time (2022) |

Singles from All Mirrors
- 1. "All Mirrors" Released: July 30, 2019; 2. "Lark" Released: September 12, 2019

All Mirrors is the fourth studio album by American art pop singer-songwriter Angel Olsen, released on October 4, 2019, by Jagjaguwar. Produced by Angel Olsen and John Congleton, the album was preceded by two singles, the title track and "Lark". Both releases were accompanied by music videos directed by Olsen's friend and longtime collaborator Ashley Connor. The album received widespread acclaim from music critics and debuted at No. 52 on the Billboard 200.

In August 2020 Olsen released Whole New Mess, a studio album featuring earlier recordings of select songs from All Mirrors.

== Critical reception ==
Professional ratings
Aggregate scores
| Source | Rating |
|---|---|
| AnyDecentMusic? | 8.4/10 |
| Metacritic | 89/100 |
Review scores
| Source | Rating |
| AllMusic | 4.5/5 stars |
| The A.V. Club | B− |
| The Guardian | 4/5 stars |
| The Independent | 4/5 stars |
| Mojo | 4/5 stars |
| NME | 5/5 stars |
| Pitchfork | 8.9/10 |
| Q | 4/5 stars |
| Rolling Stone | 4.5/5 stars |
| Uncut | 8/10 |

According to the review aggregator Metacritic, All Mirrors received "universal acclaim" based on a weighted average score of 89 out of 100 from 28 critic scores. Stephen Deusner of Uncut praised the album, writing, "Even for an artist who has redefined herself with every record, All Mirrors is her boldest reinvention yet." Victoria Segal of Mojo gave the album a favorable review, writing, "Behind the parachute silk and dry ice, the smoke and mirrors, stands a record in high emotional definition, its outline becoming sharper by the second." Rachel Aroesti of Q wrote, "Novel and nostalgic, accessible and eccentric, All Mirrors strikes an impressive balance between the familiar and strange – resulting in an album that’s startling and breathtakingly beautiful."

In the review for AllMusic, Marcy Donelson commended Olsen by claiming that "Though she may have initially built her reputation on stark and brittle atmospheres, it turns out that her trademark vulnerability is only elevated by these stirring, highly stylized interpretations, making it a risk that pays off in spades."

== Track listing ==
All lyrics are written by Angel Olsen; all music is composed by Olsen and Ben Babbitt, except where noted.

Side A
| No. | Title | Length |
|---|---|---|
| 1. | "Lark" | 6:19 |
| 2. | "All Mirrors" | 4:42 |

Side B
| No. | Title | Length |
|---|---|---|
| 3. | "Too Easy" | 2:58 |
| 4. | "New Love Cassette" | 3:27 |
| 5. | "Spring" | 3:23 |

Side C
| No. | Title | Length |
|---|---|---|
| 6. | "What It Is" (Olsen) | 3:17 |
| 7. | "Impasse" | 4:24 |
| 8. | "Tonight" (Olsen) | 4:39 |

Side D
| No. | Title | Length |
|---|---|---|
| 9. | "Summer" (Olsen) | 4:05 |
| 10. | "Endgame" | 5:20 |
| 11. | "Chance" | 6:00 |
| Total length: | | 48:33 |

== Personnel ==
Credits are adapted from the All Mirrors liner notes.

Musicians

- Angel Olsen – vocals (all tracks); guitar (1, 6, 8, 9); synthesizer (2, 3); piano (5, 10); string arrangements (2)
- Joshua Jaeger – drums (all tracks); percussion (10)
- Ben Babbitt – electric bass guitar (1–11); electric guitar (1, 2); synthesizer drones (1); Mellotron drones (1); synthesizers (2–4, 7, 9, 11); bass synthesizer (2–5, 7); baritone guitar (2, 7); EBow electric guitar (3, 5); piano (4, 6, 8, 11); Mellotron (5, 11); 12-string acoustic guitar (5); vibraphone (7); upright bass (7, 10); fuzz bass (7); additional string textures on violin and cello (7); string arrangements (2, 4, 7, 8, 10, 11)
- Jherek Bischoff – string conducting (1, 2, 4, 6–8, 10, 11); string arrangements (1, 2, 4,)
- Paris Hurley – violin I (1, 2, 4, 6–8, 10, 11)
- Laurann Angel – violin I (1, 2, 4, 6–8, 10, 11)
- Crystal Brooke Alforque – violin I (1, 2, 4, 6–8, 10, 11)
- Emily Call – violin II (1, 2, 4, 6–8, 10, 11)
- Rachel Iba – violin II (1, 2, 4, 6–8, 10, 11)
- Michelle Luna – violin II (1, 2, 4, 6–8, 10, 11)
- Madeline Falcone – viola (1, 2, 4, 6–8, 10, 11)
- Lauren Elizabeth Baba – viola (1, 2, 4, 6–8, 10, 11)
- Marta Sofia Honer – viola (1, 2, 4, 6–8, 10, 11)
- Aniela Marie Perry – cello (1, 2, 4, 6–8, 10, 11)
- April Guthrie – cello (1, 2, 4, 6–8, 10, 11)
- Nathaniel Walcott – trumpet (8, 10); flugelhorn (8, 10); brass arrangement (8, 10)
- Vikram Devasthali – trombone (8, 10)

Production and artwork

- John Congleton – production; mixing
- Angel Olsen – production
- Sean Cook – assistant engineering
- Greg Calbi – mastering
- Ben Babbitt – pre-production
- Cameron McCool – album photography
- Angel Olsen – styling
- Jack Pitney – styling
- Elyse Lightner – styling
- Miles Johnson – art direction

== Charts ==
| Chart (2019) | Peak position |
|---|---|
| Australian Albums (ARIA) | 27 |
| Belgian Albums (Ultratop Flanders) | 46 |
| Belgian Albums (Ultratop Wallonia) | 155 |
| French Albums (SNEP) | 199 |
| German Albums (Offizielle Top 100) | 74 |
| Irish Albums (IRMA) | 49 |
| New Zealand Albums (RMNZ) | 28 |
| Portuguese Albums (AFP) | 13 |
| Scottish Albums (OCC) | 11 |
| Spanish Albums (PROMUSICAE) | 69 |
| Swiss Albums (Schweizer Hitparade) | 62 |
| UK Albums (OCC) | 28 |
| UK Independent Albums (OCC) | 7 |
| US Billboard 200 | 52 |
