= Jonathan Wilson (musician) =

American musician and producer (born 1974)

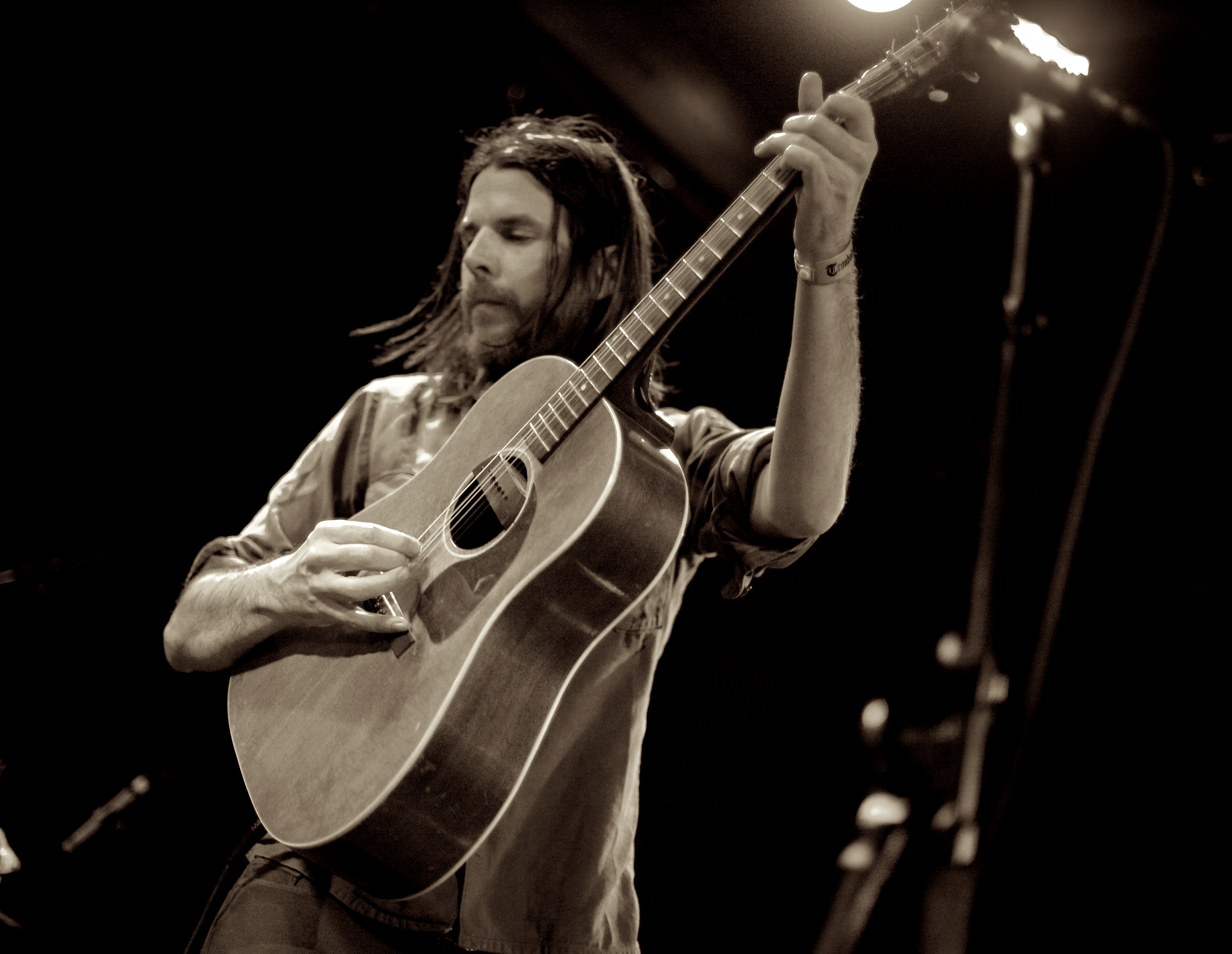

Background information
- Born: Jonathan Spencer Wilson; December 30, 1974 (age 51); Forest City, North Carolina, U.S.
- Origin: Laurel Canyon, Los Angeles
- Genres: Folk; psychedelic rock; country; R&B
- Occupations: Singer-songwriter; producer; musician
- Instruments: Vocals; guitar; piano; bass; percussion; keyboard
- Years active: 1997–present
- Labels: BMG Records; Bella Union
- Website: songsofjonathanwilson.com

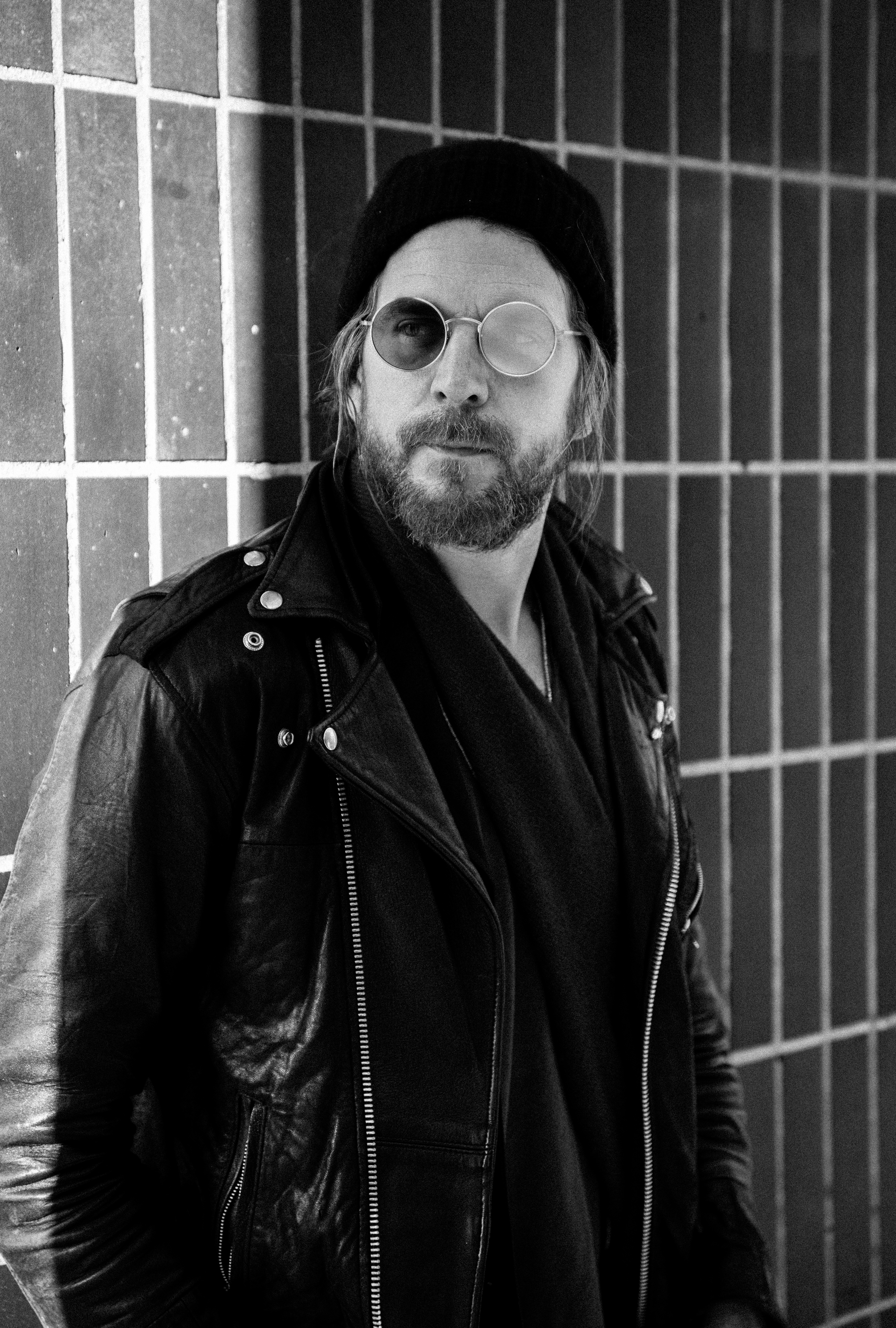
Jonathan Wilson in Copenhagen

Jonathan Spencer Wilson (born December 30, 1974) is an American producer, songwriter and musician based in Los Angeles, California. He is a frequent collaborator of Father John Misty. They co-produced Father John Misty's Grammy-nominated "Chloe and the Next 20th Century."

Wilson has produced albums for Angel Olsen, Dawes, Margo Price, Conor Oberst and Billy Strings, He is also known as Roger Waters' guitarist, having joined his backing band in 2017.

Wilson has released six solo studio albums under his own name: Frankie Ray (2007), Gentle Spirit (2011), Fanfare (2013), Rare Birds (2018), Dixie Blur (2020) and Eat the Worm (2023).

== Early life ==
Wilson was born on December 30, 1974, in Forest City, North Carolina and raised in nearby Spindale, North Carolina. Wilson lived his formative years from age 6 to 16 in the small town of Thomasville, NC, Population 15,000 at the time. His father was a local rock and roll bandleader and his grandfather a Baptist pastor whose services Wilson was often invited to play at. Wilson has cited his upbringing in North Carolina and the state's rich jazz and bluegrass musical heritage as an early influence.

== Career ==
=== Muscadine ===
Wilson founded the band Muscadine with Benji Hughes in 1995. They were scouted and signed by the legendary music business maverick Seymour Stein. The band released their debut album, The Ballad of Hope Nicholls, on Sire Records in 1998.

=== Solo career ===
Wilson released his album Gentle Spirit on Bella Union on August 8, 2011, in the UK and Europe and on September 13, 2011, in the US. The album debuted at number 15 on the UK Indie Chart and was awarded the #4 spot on Mojo's 2011 Best Albums of the Year list. Gentle Spirit features many special guests including Barry Goldberg, Chris Robinson, Gary Louris, Andy Cabic, Otto Hauser, Josh Grange, Gary Mallaber, Z Berg, Adam McDougall, Johnathan Rice, among others. Jonathan was named Uncut Magazine's 2011 "New Artist of the Year".

In April 2012, Wilson released "Pity Trials and Tomorrow's Child", a limited edition vinyl EP on Bella Union for Record Store Day 2012. American Songwriter named it, "Five Things To Look For On Record Store Day". One of the album's three tracks, a cover of George Harrison's "Isn't It A Pity", includes guest vocals by Graham Nash.

In October 2013, Wilson released his second album, Fanfare, on Downtown Records and Bella Union. The album debuted at #8 on the UK Indie Chart, #50 on the UK Overall Chart, #18 in the Norway Overall Chart and #49 in the Netherlands in its first week. Uncut Magazine and Rolling Stone Germany named Fanfare its Album of the Month the month of its release. The album features contributions from David Crosby, Graham Nash, Jackson Browne, Mike Campbell, Benmont Tench, Father John Misty, Taylor Goldsmith (Dawes) and Patrick Sansone (Wilco). The album also features Wilson's band, including Jason Borger, Omar Velasco, Richard Gowen and Dan Horne. Roy Harper wrote the lyrics to the song "New Mexico".

In February 2018, Wilson released his third solo album Rare Birds. On March 6, 2020, he released his new solo album called Dixie Blur. Wilson also completed a solo album titled Frankie Ray in 2007. The record was never officially released.

Wilson's next studio album Eat The Worm was released September 8, 2023. He describes the new album as a chance to "break out of any and all comfort zones I may have lapsed into." American Songwriter describes it as "sporadically psychedelic, always creative, frequently elaborate, and certainly bizarre soundscapes Wilson delivers with his usual attention to aural detail".

== Record producer and other projects ==
=== Record production ===
Wilson currently maintains his recording studio, Fivestarstudios, in Topanga, California. The studio was located in Echo Park for 9 years and relocated from its original location in Laurel Canyon in 2009.

Frequently collaborating with Father John Misty, Jonathan has produced and played on his Grammy nominated Best Engineered Album "Chloë and the Next 20th Century" (2022), Grammy nominated Best Alternative Music Album "Pure Comedy" (2017), "I Love You, Honeybear" (2015), and "Fear Fun" (2012). He mixed and contributed to "God's Favorite Customer" (2018).

In 2022 Jonathan produced the highly acclaimed Angel Olsen album "Big Time", as well has her 2023 EP "Forever Means".

In 2021 Jonathan produced Billy Strings' album "Renewal" which was Grammy nominated for Best Bluegrass Album and Best American Roots Performance.

Margo Price's albums "Strays" and "Strays II" were produced by Jonathan in 2023. "Strays II" included the song "Malibu" (feat. Jonathan Wilson, Buck Meek of Big Thief).

Jonathan also frequently collaborates with the band Dawes, having produced "North Hills" (2009), "Nothing Is Wrong" (2011) "Passwords" (2018), and "Misadventures of Doomscroller" (2022).

Other recent notable albums by Wilson include Grace Cummings' "Ramona" (2024), Erin Rae's "Lighten Up" (2022), Sam Burton's "Dear Departed" (2023), Bella White's "Among Other Things" (2023).

In 2019 Wilson and Jackson Browne co-produced the album "Let the Rhythm Lead", songs recorded in Haiti for the Artists for Peace and Justice non-profit, benefiting the Audio Institute of Haiti, a recording arts training school and recording studio.

2019 Wilson produced his own album Dixie Blur alongside co-producer Pat Sansone of Wilco in Nashville, TN featuring Mark O'Connor, Drew Erickson, Dennis Crouch, Kenny Vaughn, Jon Radford, Russ Pahl, and others.

In 2017 Wilson produced "Double Roses" by Karen Elson with features from Father John Misty, Laura Marling and Pat Carney of the Black Keys.

In 2014 Wilson produced and played on Conor Oberst's album "Upside Down Mountain" released on Nonesuch Records. The album was recorded at Wilson's Fivestar Studios in Los Angeles and Blackbird Studios in Nashville.

In 2013 Wilson produced "Jubilee", the fifth album from Canadian band, The Deep Dark Woods in Alberta, Canada.

In 2012, Wilson produced and played on Roy Harper's latest album, Man and Myth (Bella Union, 2013) at Fivestarstudios. In the same year, Wilson produced a Glen Campbell session at Fivestar Studios for Daytrotter.

In 2011, Wilson co-produced and played on the debut Father John Misty record, Fear Fun released on Sub Pop, at Fivestar Studios.

In 2010, Wilson produced and collaborated with Bonnie 'Prince' Billy on a series of songs for release on Spiritual Pajamas Records, a boutique 7" label associated with Folk Yeah Presents. Wilson recorded and produced Dawes' debut album, North Hills, at his Laurel Canyon studio. That same year, Wilson recorded and produced Dawes' second album, Nothing Is Wrong.

As part of Wilson's project, What You Need Is What You Have, The Songs of Roy Harper, Wilson has produced songs performed by Will Oldham, Andy Cabic, Chris Robinson, Benji Hughes, Dawes, Jenny O., Johnathan Rice, Josh Tillman, and others. Wilson also produced Jason Boesel's album, Hustler's Son, Mia Doi Todd's album Cosmic Ocean Ship and mixed Goodnight Lenin's debut album, In The Fullness Of Time, due for release in late 2014. Wilson has also recorded and/or produced many other artists in his studio, including Gerald Johnson, James Gadson, and Josh Tillman.

=== Other music projects ===
In 2010 and 2011, Wilson collaborated with Erykah Badu in the studio on several songs, only one of which was officially released. Wilson also appeared as a special guest with Erykah Badu at her 2011 Coachella performance.

In April 2011, Wilson performed with Robbie Robertson and Dawes on CBS's Late Show with David Letterman, ABC's The View and Later... with Jools Holland in support of Robertson's album How to Become Clairvoyant.

In the fall of 2011, Wilson was invited by Roy Harper as a special guest at Royal Festival Hall as part of Harper's sold out 70th birthday celebration. Wilson also toured with Wilco in the fall of 2011 for 15 shows across the UK & Europe. In July 2011 Wilson performed and collaborated with Jackson Browne and Dawes on a mini tour throughout Spain. Wilson performed at the 2011 benefit concert for Musicians United for Safe Energy. Wilson was joined onstage by Jackson Browne and Graham Nash to perform his song "Gentle Spirit". Wilson also joined Crosby, Stills & Nash, Jackson Browne, Bonnie Raitt and others for the concert's finale, "Teach Your Children".

In August 2012, Wilson was featured as a guest of Move Me Brightly, a tribute to Jerry Garcia. In June 2012, he and his band were invited by Tom Petty & The Heartbreakers to support them on their 2012 European tour, which included 2 sold out nights at Royal Albert Hall.

In 2013, Wilson curated a collection of songs as part of What You Need Is What You Have, The Songs of Roy Harper, a Roy Harper tribute album that includes songs performed by Will Oldham, Andy Cabic, Chris Robinson, Benji Hughes, Dawes, Jenny O., Johnathan Rice, Josh Tillman, and others. Wilson was a member of The Emerald Triangle, a touring collaboration with Andy Cabic, Johnathan Rice, Neal Casal, and Husky. In addition, Wilson has recorded projects and/or performed with Johnathan Rice for Reprise Records, Chris Robinson and Phil Lesh Ramblin' Jack Elliott, and Bert Jansch.

In 2017, Wilson appeared on Roger Waters' album Is This the Life We Really Want?, produced by Nigel Godrich. He also toured with Waters on his 2017–18 Us + Them tour, and again in 2022-2023 on Waters' This Is Not A Drill tour.

=== Laurel Canyon ===
Wilson is credited with revitalizing the Laurel Canyon music scene with the help of his many friends and is featured in the 2009 book Canyon of Dreams by rock historian Harvey Kubernik. Wilson had hosted private jam sessions at his compound in Laurel Canyon that involved Andy Cabic, Pat Sansone, John Stirratt, Gerald Johnson, Johnathan Rice, Gary Louris, Mark Olson, Chris Robinson, David Rawlings, Benmont Tench, and other notable artists who have played professionally with and/or in The Electric Flag, Paul Butterfield Blues Band, Van Morrison, The Cars, Bruce Springsteen, Steve Miller Band, and Pearl Jam. The jam was founded by Wilson and Chris Robinson.

== Personal life ==
Wilson is married to artist Andrea Nakhla.

== Discography ==
=== Solo artist ===
Albums

- Frankie Ray, Pretty and Black Records, 2007
- Gentle Spirit, Bella Union, 2011 (UK Indie chart peak: #15)
- Fanfare, Downtown Records / Bella Union, October 2013 (UK Indie chart peak: #8, UK Albums Chart peak: #50, Norway chart peak #18)
- Rare Birds, Bella Union, March 2, 2018 (UK Albums Chart peak: #79)
- Dixie Blur, BMG, 2020
- Eat the Worm, September 2023

Extended plays

- Pity Trials and Tomorrow's Child, Bella Union, 2012
- Slide By, November 2014
- The Way I Feel & More, July 2020
- 69 Corvette EP, August 2020
- El Camino Real EP, September 2020
- Rare Blur EP, November 2020
- Moon Over Minas, November 2024

Singles

- "Marzipan", March 2023
- "Charlie Parker", June 2023
- "The Village Is Dead", August 2023

=== Album production credits ===
- Jonathan Wilson – Frankie Ray (2007)
- Dawes – North Hills (2009)
- Jason Boesel – Hustler's Son (2010)
- Jonathan Wilson – Gentle Spirit (2011)
- Dawes – Nothing Is Wrong (2011)
- Mia Doi Todd – Cosmic Ocean Ship (2011)
- Father John Misty – Fear Fun (2012)
- Jonathan Wilson – Fanfare (2013)
- Roy Harper – Man and Myth (2013)
- The Deep Dark Woods – Jubilee (2013)
- Conor Oberst – Upside Down Mountain (2014)
- Father John Misty – I Love You, Honeybear (2015)
- Father John Misty – Pure Comedy (2017)
- Dawes – Passwords (2018)
- Jonathan Wilson – Dixie Blur (2020)
- Father John Misty – Chloë and the Next 20th Century (2021)
- Billy Strings – Renewal (2021)
- Erin Rae – Lighten Up (2021)
- Mary Scholz – Begin Again (2022)
- Dawes – Misadventures of Doomscroller 2022
- Angel Olsen – Big Time (2022)
- Sam Burton – Dear Departed (2023)
- Jonathan Wilson - Eat the Worm (2023)
- Margo Price – Strays (2023)
- Bella White - Among Other Things (2023)
- Grace Cummings – Ramona (2024)
- Benmont Tench - The Melancholy Season (2025)
- Aly & AJ - Silver Deliverer (2025)
- Kesha - Period (2025)
- Del Water Gap - "Chasing the Chimera" (2025)

=== As part of Muscadine ===
- The Ballad of Hope Nichols, Sire Records, 1998
- LP2, Sire Records
- Live from Studio East, Sire Records

=== Song production credits ===
- Dawes, "Wild Tales", Be Yourself: A Tribute to Graham Nash's Songs for Beginners, Grass Roots Records, 2010
- Johnathan Rice, "On the Line", Be Yourself: A Tribute to Graham Nash's Songs for Beginners, Grass Roots Records, 2010
- Jonathan Wilson, "La Isla Bonita", Through the Wildernesss, a Tribute to Madonna, Manimal Vinyl, 2007
- Bonnie "Prince" Billy, "See You Again", What You Need Is What You Have, the Songs of Roy Harper, TBD, TBD
- Bonnie "Prince" Billy and Mariee Sioux, Grass Roots Record Co., TBD
- Johnathan Rice, "Goldfish", What You Need Is What You Have, the Songs of Roy Harper, TBD, TBD
- Benji Hughes, "Another Day", What You Need Is What You Have, the Songs of Roy Harper, TBD, TBD
- Chris Robinson, "Hallucinating Light", What You Need Is What You Have, the Songs of Roy Harper, TBD, TBD
- Jenny O., "Cherish", What You Need Is What You Have, the Songs of Roy Harper, TBD, TBD
- Whispertown2000, Acony Records
- Ilya Monosov, Holy Mountain Records

=== Musician credits ===
- Roger Waters, Comfortably Numb 2022, Sony Music, 2022
- Roger Waters, Is This the Life We Really Want?, Columbia Records, 2017
- Roy Harper, Man and Myth, Bella Union, 2013
- Father John Misty, Fear Fun, Sub Pop, 2012
- Amy Cook, Summer Skin, Thirty Tigers, 2012
- Dawes, Nothing Is Wrong, ATO Records, 2011
- A Fine Frenzy, TBD, Virgin, 2011
- Mia Doi Todd, Cosmic Ocean Ship, City Zen Records, 2011
- Autumn Defense, Once Around, Yep Roc Records, 2010
- Farmer Dave Scher, Flash Forward to the Good Times, Kemado Records, 2010
- Shooter Jennings and Hierophant, Black Ribbons, Black Country Rock, 2010
- Erykah Badu, Maybach Music (as released by Rick Ross), 2010
- Jason Boesel, Hustler's Son, Team Love Records, 2010
- Various Artists, Be Yourself: A Tribute to Graham Nash's Songs for Beginners, Grass Roots Records, 2010
- Dawes, North Hills, ATO Records, 2009
- Vetiver, Tight Knit, Sub Pop, 2009
- Elvis Costello, Momofuku, Lost Highway Records, 2008
- Jenny Lewis, Acid Tongue, Warner Brothers Records, 2008
- Vetiver, Things of the Past, Gnomonsong, 2008
- Benji Hughes, A Love Extreme, New West Records, 2008
- The Shore, Light Years, Independently Release, 2008
- Gary Louris, Vagabonds, Rykodisc, 2007
- Maria Taylor, Lynn Teeter Flower, Saddle Creek Records, 2007
- Johnathan Rice, Further North, Reprise Records, 2007
- J. Tillman, Fun Times in Babylon, TBD, TBD
- Barry Goldberg, Rhino Records
- Chris Robinson and Phil Lesh, TBD, TBD, TBD
- Big Eagle, Grass Roots Record Co.
- Kevin Barker, You and Me, Gnomonsong
- Jonathan Wilson and Farmer Dave Scher, West Coast Dream Sequence, Vol. 1, TBD, TBD
- Gerald Johnson and James Gadson, Every Day, TBD, TBD
- Bonnie "Prince" Billy and Mariee Sioux, Grass Roots Record Co., TBD
- Various Artists, What You Need Is What You Have, tThe Songs of Roy Harper, TBD, TBD
