= Dixie Blur =

Studio album by Jonathan Wilson
- Released: March 6, 2020
- Length: 55:04
- Label: Bella Union (UK); BMG (US)

Jonathan Wilson chronology
Rare Birds (2018)	Dixie Blur (2020)	Eat the Worm (2023)

Professional ratings
Aggregate scores
Source	Rating
Metacritic	80/100
Review scores
Source	Rating
AllMusic	4/5 stars
The Line of Best Fit	8/10
Under the Radar	7/10

Dixie Blur is the fourth studio album by American musician and producer Jonathan Wilson. It was released on March 6, 2020, by Bella Union.

== Critical reception ==
Dixie Blur was met with generally favorable reviews from critics. At Metacritic, which assigns a weighted average rating out of 100 to reviews from mainstream publications, this release received an average score of 80, based on 6 reviews.

== Track listing ==
Dixie Blur track listing
No.	Title	Length
1.	"Just for Love"	3:15
2.	"'69 Corvette"	4:21
3.	"New Home"	3:46
4.	"So Alive"	4:49
5.	"In Heaven Making Love"	2:52
6.	"Oh Girl"	4:57
7.	"Pirate"	3:21
8.	"Enemies"	3:47
9.	"Fun for the Masses"	3:06
10.	"Platform"	3:34
11.	"Riding the Blinds"	4:48
12.	"El Camino Real"	3:05
13.	"Golden Apples"	3:19
14.	"Korean Tea"	6:04
Total length:		55:04

== Charts ==
Chart performance for Dixie Blur
Chart (2020)	Peak position
German Albums (Offizielle Top 100)	41
Scottish Albums (OCC)	38
UK Americana Albums (OCC)	1
UK Independent Albums (OCC)	8
