= Forever Means =

EP by Angel Olsen
- Released: April 14, 2023
- Length: 16:00
- Label: Jagjaguwar
- Producer: Angel Olsen; Jonathan Wilson

Angel Olsen chronology
Big Time (2022)	Forever Means (2023)

Forever Means is an extended play by American singer-songwriter Angel Olsen. It was released on April 14, 2023 by Jagjaguwar. The extended play consists of four songs that were recorded for Olsen's album Big Time (2022), but did not make the final track listing.

== Critical reception ==
Professional ratings
Aggregate scores
Source	Rating
Metacritic	81/100
Review scores
Source	Rating
Beats Per Minute	80%
DIY	4.5/5 stars
Pitchfork	7.0/10
PopMatters	8/10
The Telegraph	4/5 stars

Upon release, Forever Means received positive acclaim from music critics. At Metacritic, which assigns a normalized rating out of 100 to reviews from mainstream publications, the EP has an average score of 81 out of 100 based on five reviews, indicating "universal acclaim".

== Track listing ==
All lyrics are written by Angel Olsen; all music is composed by Olsen and Jonathan Wilson.

No.	Title	Length
1.	"Nothing's Free"	4:38
2.	"Forever Means"	3:27
3.	"Time Bandits"	3:54
4.	"Holding On"	4:01
Total length:		16:00

== Personnel ==
Musicians

- Angel Olsen – vocals (all tracks), guitar (tracks 2, 4)
- Emily Elhaj – bass guitar (1, 3, 4)
- Drew Erickson – conductor (all tracks); organ, piano (1, 3); keyboards (2), synthesizer (3)
- Jonathan Wilson – drums (1, 3, 4), percussion (1, 3), guitar (3, 4), piano (4)
- Dan Higgins – saxophone (1)
- Jake Blanton – guitar (3, 4)
- Griffin Goldsmith – drums, percussion (3, 4)
- Wayne Bergeron – trumpet (3)

Technical

- Angel Olsen – production
- Jonathan Wilson – production, mixing
- Adam Ayan – mastering
- Franky Fox – engineering
- Grant Milliken – engineering
- Michael Harris – engineering
- Mirza Sherrif – engineering

Visuals

- Miles Johnson – design
- Angela Ricciardi – photography
- Silken Weinberg – styling
