= Safe in the Car =

Song by Jeff Ament

from the album Heaven/Hell
- Released: 19 April 2018
- Genre: Alternative rock
- Length: 3:19
- Label: Monkeywrench
- Songwriter: Jeff Ament
- Producer: Greg Twigg

"Safe in the Car" is a song by the American musician Jeff Ament. It was first released as a music video on YouTube on 19 April 2018 and later appeared his third studio album Heaven/Hell three weeks later. Aments Pearl Jam bandmates Matt Cameron and Mike McCready played drums and guitar on the song respectively. Singer Angel Olsen also collaborated on the track.

== Background ==
Ament, in an interview with Rolling Stone, said about the music video: I was seeing Cormac McCarthy's The Road – you're driving to the coast and you're trying to get away from the nuclear winter and you have your dogs in the car and you're just trying to escape this horrible apocalypse that just happened. On his collaboration with Olsen Ament told NME, "when we were doing this song I kept hearing a woman’s voice on the chorus and I thought, ‘Man it would be great if I could get somebody to sing that’. I asked Angel if she would be up for doing it and she had a couple of days off in-between the tour and we were finishing the song up. It takes that chorus and the desperation to the next level, so great call".

Ament said the first thing that came to his mind when asked what he wanted the video to look like was "grindhouse". He stated that he "always loved the super high-contrast, dark look of that. It's the world coming to an end and trying to have a sense of humor about it." Ament directed the clip, with Greg Twigg producing and Mark Shogren as director of photography, who both provided "more of the disturbing look" seen in the video. Loudwire described the video as Ament behind the wheel attempting to "flee floods, fires, glacial advancement, mudslides and more that are hot on his trail".

== Reviews ==
Spin called it an "unwieldy tune - a weird bromide of chugging alt-rock and orchestral ambience...it’s a garish but simple little clip featuring close-ups of Ament singing while, quite literally, safe in a car". Paste said the "confident, string-filled track is the perfect song for strutting the streets with Olsen’s hazy, silky vocals, Ament’s distorted snarls and McCready’s warped, swaggering electric guitar riffs". Consequence of Sound stated it's "a strange bit of alternative, the verses progressing with a Primus-like stalk until the choruses break with a sort of haunted beauty".

== Personnel ==
- Jeff Ament – all instruments (unless otherwise noted)
- Matt Cameron – drums
- Mike McCready – guitars
- Angel Olsen – vocals
