= Rare Birds (album) =

Studio album by Jonathan Wilson
- Released: March 2, 2018
- Studio: Five Star Studios
- Length: 78:44
- Label: Bella Union
- Producer: Jonathan Wilson

Jonathan Wilson chronology
Slide By (2014)	Rare Birds (2018)	Dixie Blur (2020)

Professional ratings
Aggregate scores
Source	Rating
AnyDecentMusic?	7.3/10
Metacritic	74/100
Review scores
Source	Rating
AllMusic	3.5/5 stars
American Songwriter	4/5 stars
Dork	4/5 stars
Exclaim!	7/10
God Is in the TV	9/10
The Independent	3/5 stars
The Line of Best Fit	8/10
The Observer	4/5 stars
Under the Radar	5.5/10

Rare Birds is the third studio album by American musician and producer Jonathan Wilson. It was released on March 2, 2018, under Bella Union.

== Production ==
The album was self-produced by Wilson at his Five Star Studios, with Jeffertitti Moon; in Echo Park, Los Angeles.

== Release ==
On December 5, 2017, Jonathan Wilson revealed the new album to be released on Bella Union on March 2, 2018. The album has appearances by Lana Del Rey, Laraaji and Father John Misty. The first single to be released from the album, "Over The Midnight" is directed by Andrea Nakhla.

== Critical reception ==
Rare Birds was met with "generally favorable" reviews from critics. At Metacritic, which assigns a weighted average rating out of 100 to reviews from mainstream publications, this release received an average score of 74, based on 13 reviews. Aggregator Album of the Year gave the release a 74 out of 100 based on a critical consensus of 12 reviews.

Thom Jurek from AllMusic explained that the album "is dizzying in ambition and (mostly) dazzling in execution. It offers hours of enjoyment to anyone who takes it on. It's sprawling at nearly 80 minutes, and lavishly packaged.". Andy Gill from The Independent stated: "The lush opacity becomes claustrophobic over his eighty-minute default track length: though frequently sweet and beautiful, one’s ultimately left like Heliogabalus, drowned in rose petals.".

=== Accolades ===
Accolades for Rare Birds
Publication	Accolade	Rank
Glide Magazine	Glide Magazine's Top 20 Albums of 2018	N/A
OOR	OOR's Top 20 Albums of 2018	18
Uproxx	Uproxx' Top 50 Albums of 2018 – Mid-Year	41

== Track listing ==
Rare Birds track listing
No.	Title	Length
1.	"Trafalgar Square" (featuring Jessica Wolfe and Holly Laessig)	6:23
2.	"Me"	4:49
3.	"Over the Midnight" (featuring Krystle Warren)	8:15
4.	"There's A Light" (featuring Jessica Wolfe and Holly Laessig)	4:57
5.	"Sunset Boulevard" (featuring Omar Velasco)	5:44
6.	"Rare Birds" (featuring Jessica Wolfe, Holly Laessig and Omar Velasco)	5:25
7.	"49 Hair Flips" (featuring Father John Misty and Krystle Warren)	5:11
8.	"Miriam Montague" (featuring Father John Misty)	4:41
9.	"Loving You" (featuring Laraaji)	8:28
10.	"Living With Myself" (featuring Lana Del Rey)	6:46
11.	"Hard To Get Over"	6:32
12.	"Hi-Ho The Righteous"	6:06
13.	"MulHolland Queen"	5:21

== Personnel ==
Musicians

- Jonathan Wilson – primary artist
- Dan Bailey – drums (track 6, 8)
- Joey Waronker – drums (tracks 1, 2, 4, 5, 6, 10)
- Jake Blanton – bass (tracks 1, 2, 4, 5, 6)
- Dan Horne – moog bass
- Pete Jacobsen – cello (track 2, 4, 5, 7, 8, 11)
- John Kirby – piano (tracks 3, 4, 8, 10)
- Ziad Rabie – saxophone (track 2, 8)
- Tom Lea – violin (tracks 2, 4, 5, 7, 8)
- Derek Stein – cello (tracks 2, 4, 5, 7, 8, 11)
- Greg Leisz – guitar (track 4, 6, 10)
- Jessica Wolfe – guest vocals (tracks 1, 4, 6)
- Laraaji – gues vocals (track 9)
- Josh Tillman – guest vocals (tracks 3, 7)
- Krystle Warren – guest vocals (tracks 3, 7)
- Holly Laessig – guest vocals (tracks 1, 4, 6)
- Omar Velasco – guest vocals (track 5, 6)
- Lana Del Rey – guest vocals (track 9, 10)
- Ziad Rabie – saxophone
- Jeffertitti – co-producer, vocals (track 3, 11), piano (track 3), mellotron (track 8, 12) , moog (track 12)

Production

- Adam Ayan – mastering
- Dave Cerminara – mixing
- Drew Erickson – string arrangement
- Andrea Nakhla – photographer

== Charts ==
Chart performance for Rare Birds
Chart (2018)	Peak position
Belgian Albums (Ultratop Flanders)	33
Belgian Albums (Ultratop Wallonia)	102
Dutch Albums (Album Top 100)	41
French Albums (SNEP)	116
German Albums (Offizielle Top 100)	33
Scottish Albums (OCC)	32
Swiss Albums (Schweizer Hitparade)	49
UK Albums (OCC)	79
UK Independent Albums (OCC)	8
US Americana/Folk Albums (Billboard)	10
US Heatseekers Albums (Billboard)	10
US Independent Albums (Billboard)	32
US Indie Store Album Sales (Billboard)	21
