= Dear Departed =

Studio album by Sam Burton
- Released: July 14, 2023
- Genre: Folk; Singer-songwriter
- Length: 40:42
- Language: English
- Label: Partisan
- Producer: Jonathan Wilson

Sam Burton chronology
I Can Go with You (2020)	Dear Departed (2023)

Dear Departed is a 2023 studio album by American musician Sam Burton. It has received positive reviews from critics.

== Reception ==
Matthew George of Belfast Telegraph rated Dear Departed a 6 out of 10, writing that the album "is full of tasteful strings, with occasional glimpses of pedal steel guitar, with the instrumentation never dominating Burton's strong voice". Editors at The Boston Globe included this among their 50 favorite albums of 2023, with Stuart Munro calling it "an exercise in artistic catharsis after love's departure" with "a serving of relentlessly slow-rolling, moody melancholia, sometimes flecked with Laurel Canyon folk, other times with echoes of vintage Glen Campbell, and with a good bit of country-soul vibe as well". In The Observer, Phil Mongredien scored Dear Departed 3 out of 5 stars, comparing the work to Jackson Browne, Glen Campbell, and Harry Nilsson, with a "low-key charm" accentuated by "Burton's gentle, ruminative, slightly mournful vocals". At Uncut, Wyndham Wallace rated this release 4 out of 5 stars, stating that this album mixes the nostalgic with the timeless and the publication's editors named it the 23rd best album of 2023.

== Track listing ==
All songs written by Sam Burton.

1. "Pale Blue Night" – 4:09
2. "I Don't Blame You" – 3:51
3. "Long Way Around" – 3:59
4. "Coming Down on Me" – 3:01
5. "Empty Handed" – 4:28
6. "Maria" – 3:56
7. "I Go to Sleep" – 3:30
8. "Looking Back Again" – 4:51
9. "My Love" – 4:33
10. "A Place to Stay" – 4:22

== Personnel ==
- Sam Burton – acoustic guitar, 12-string acoustic guitar, electric guitar, vocals
- Jake Blanton – bass guitar, baritone guitar
- Christian Claflin – cover art, photography
- Drew Erickson – piano, electric piano, electric organ, strings, arrangement
- Haylie Hostetter – vocals
- Grant Milliken – piano, engineering
- Cornelia Murr – vocals
- Ny Oh – vocals
- Andrew Riley – photography
- Omar Velasco – acoustic guitar, electric guitar, vocals
- Jonathan Wilson – drums, electric guitar, Jew's harp, electric organ, percussion, vocals, engineering, mixing, production

== See also ==
- 2023 in American music
- List of 2023 albums
