= Tower Grove Christian Academy =

Location
- 4257 Magnolia Avenue; St. Louis, Missouri 63110; United States; 38.609119°N 90.256489°W

Information
- Type: Private
- Established: 1978
- NCES School ID: 02041635
- President: Michael Gregory
- Faculty: 12.4 ((on an FTE basis))
- Grades: PreK–8
- Enrollment: 112 (K–8, 2021–22)
- Student to teacher ratio: 9.0
- Campus: Urban
- Accreditation: Independent Schools Association of the Central States (ISACS)
- Tuition: $6,800
- Website: www.tgca.info

Tower Grove Christian Academy (TGCA) is a PreK–8 co-ed Private Christian School located in Saint Louis, Missouri, United States. It is directly adjacent to Tower Grove Park. Education is provided with a Baptist Christian biblical worldview. The school is owned by Tower Grove Baptist Church.
