= Big Time (Angel Olsen album) =

Studio album by Angel Olsen
- Released: June 3, 2022
- Studio: Fivestarstudios (Los Angeles)
- Genre: Country
- Length: 46:38
- Label: Jagjaguwar
- Producers: Jonathan Wilson; Angel Olsen

Angel Olsen chronology
Whole New Mess (2020)	Big Time (2022)	Forever Means (2023)

Singles from Big Time
- 1. "All the Good Times" Released: March 29, 2022; 2. "Big Time" Released: April 27, 2022; 3. "Through the Fires" Released: May 19, 2022

Big Time is the fifth studio album by American singer-songwriter Angel Olsen, and her first original release since All Mirrors (2019). The album was released on June 3, 2022, by Jagjaguwar. Produced by Olsen and Jonathan Wilson, the album was preceded by the singles "All the Good Times", "Big Time" and "Through the Fires". The record was accompanied by a 28-minute visual counterpart, directed by Kimberly Stuckwisch.

== Critical reception ==
Professional ratings
Aggregate scores
Source	Rating
AnyDecentMusic?	8.3/10
Metacritic	88/100
Review scores
Source	Rating
AllMusic	4/5 stars
The A.V. Club	A−
Clash	8/10
The Independent	5/5 stars
MusicOMH	4.5/5 stars
NME	4/5 stars
Pitchfork	8.1/10
PopMatters	8/10
Rolling Stone	4/5 stars
The Skinny	5/5 stars

At Metacritic, which assigns a normalised rating out of 100 to reviews from mainstream publications, the album received an average score of 88 based on 23 reviews, indicating "universal acclaim". John Amen of PopMatters praised the album, writing, "With Big Time, Olsen draws inspiration from some of popular music's most perennial templates, revamping them and, once again, reinventing herself."

Year-end Lists
Publication	List	Rank	Ref
34th Street	Street's Favorite Albums of 2022	N/A	
Albumism	The 100 Best Albums of 2022	18	
A.V. Club	The 30 Best Albums of 2022	8	
The Bitter Southerner	Best Southern Albums of 2022	1	
BrooklynVegan	15 Great Country Albums from 2022	N/A	
Entertainment Weekly	The 10 Best Albums of 2022	5	
Exclaim!	Exclaim!'s 50 Best Albums of 2022	14	
Far Out	The 50 best albums of 2022	7	
The Independent	The Independent's Best Albums of 2022	8	
The Line of Best Fit	The Best Albums of 2022 Ranked	26	
Los Angeles Times	Mikael Wood: The 20 Best Albums of 2022	6	
NPR	The 50 Best Albums of 2022	23	
ourculture	The 50 Best Albums of 2022	30	
Premier Guitar	Best Albums of 2022	N/A	
Record Collector	Best New Albums of 2022	10	
The Ringer	The 33 Best Albums of 2022	9	
Rolling Stone	The 100 Best Albums of 2022	18	
Slant	The 50 Best Albums of 2022	8	
Stereogum	Best Albums of 2022	50	
Time	The 10 Best Albums of 2022	7	
Uncut	Uncut's Best New Albums Of 2022	4	
Variety	Jem Aswad's Top 10	2	
Vulture	Best Albums of 2022	Honorable Mention	

== Track listing ==
All lyrics are written by Angel Olsen; all music is composed by Olsen, except "Big Time" composed by Olsen and Beau Thibodeaux.

Side A
No.	Title	Length
1.	"All the Good Times"	4:31
2.	"Big Time"	4:07

Side B
No.	Title	Length
3.	"Dream Thing"	3:53
4.	"Ghost On"	4:20
5.	"All the Flowers"	3:37

Side C
No.	Title	Length
6.	"Right Now"	5:07
7.	"This Is How It Works"	6:24

Side D
No.	Title	Length
8.	"Go Home"	5:25
9.	"Through the Fires"	4:31
10.	"Chasing the Sun"	4:43
Total length:		46:38

== Personnel ==
Credits are adapted from the Big Time liner notes.

Musicians

- Angel Olsen – vocals (all tracks), guitar (tracks 1–8)
- Dan Higgins – horn arrangement, flute, alto saxophone, baritone saxophone, tenor saxophone (1, 6, 8)
- Emily Elhaj – bass (1–4, 6–9), fuzz guitar (1)
- Jake Blanton – guitar (1–4, 6, 9), concert bells (1), electric sitar (4)
- Jonathan Wilson – drums (1–4, 6–9), guitar (1, 2, 4, 7, 8), Mellotron (1, 6), percussion (1–4, 6–10), lap steel (1), zither (3), baritone guitar (4); synth bass, double bass (5); fuzz guitar (6, 8); nylon guitar, mandolin (6); harmonium (8)
- Drew Erickson – string arrangements, conductor, piano (all tracks); organ (1–4, 6, 7, 9); Wurlitzer, Solina (3); harpsichord (4, 5, 7, 8), sub-bass (6), clavichord (7)
- Steve Holtman – trombone, bass trombone (1, 6, 8)
- Wayne Bergeron – trumpet (1, 6, 8)
- Gus Seyffert – guitar (2)
- Spencer Cullum – pedal steel (3, 7)
- Grant Milliken – vibraphone (4, 7, 9)
- Jacob Braun – cello (5, 6, 8, 10)
- Zach Dellinger – viola (5, 6, 8–10)
- Andrew Bullbrook – first violin (5, 6, 8–10)
- Wynton Grant – second violin (5, 6, 8–10)

Technical

- Jonathan Wilson – production, mixing
- Angel Olsen – production
- Adam Ayan – mastering
- Grant Milliken – engineering
- Mirza Sheriff – engineering
- Michael Harris – strings and horns engineering
- Franky Fox – strings and horns engineering assistance

Visuals

- Miles Johnson – layout
- Angela Ricciardi – photography
- Silken Weinberg – styling

== Charts ==
Chart performance for Big Time
Chart (2022)	Peak position
Australian Albums (ARIA)	40
Belgian Albums (Ultratop Flanders)	26
Belgian Albums (Ultratop Wallonia)	162
German Albums (Offizielle Top 100)	46
Irish Albums (IRMA)	69
New Zealand Albums (RMNZ)	25
Portuguese Albums (AFP)	27
Scottish Albums (Official Charts)	5
Spanish Albums (Promusicae)	92
Swiss Albums (Schweizer Hitparade)	39
UK Albums (Official Charts)	24
UK Americana Albums (Official Charts)	1
UK Independent Albums (Official Charts)	2
US Billboard 200	121
US Americana/Folk Albums (Billboard)	4
US Independent Albums (Billboard)	14
US Top Alternative Albums (Billboard)	8
US Top Rock Albums (Billboard)	17
