= Tim Kinsella Sings the Songs of Marvin Tate by Leroy Bach Featuring Angel Olsen =

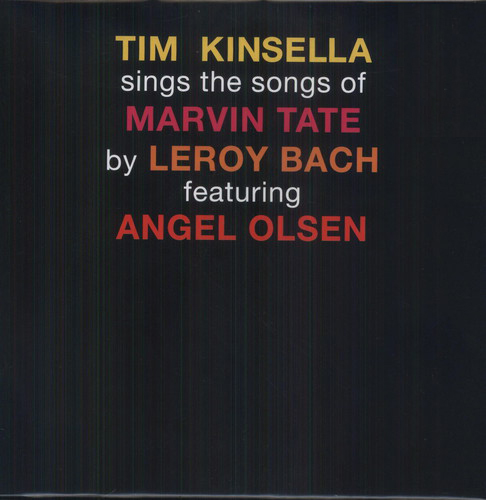

Studio album by Tim Kinsella, Marvin Tate, Leroy Bach, Angel Olsen
- Released: 2013
- Length: 27:32
- Label: Joyful Noise Recordings

Tim Kinsella Sings the Songs of Marvin Tate by Leroy Bach Featuring Angel Olsen is a 2013 collaborative album by Tim Kinsella, Marvin Tate, Leroy Bach, and Angel Olsen.

== Track listing ==
1. Idolize - 1:38
2. The Crossing Guard - 2:10
3. Daddy Wants To Be A Robin - 1:38
4. The Bus Is Coming - 1:55
5. Snowglobe -3:07
6. All In My Head - 1:42
7. The Baseball Players Wife - 4:05
8. This Time (Not The Next Time) - 2:48
9. 100 Kinds of Crazy - 1:35
10. Sidetracked In Miami - 2:36
11. God Ain't Ready For You - 0:32
12. Never Finished Counting - 1:51
