= Phases (Angel Olsen album) =

Compilation album by Angel Olsen
- Released: November 10, 2017
- Length: 38:58
- Label: Jagjaguwar

Angel Olsen chronology
My Woman (2016)	Phases (2017)	All Mirrors (2019)

Singles from Phases
- 1. "Fly on Your Wall" Released: January 20, 2017; 2. "Special" Released: November 10, 2017; 3. "Sans" Released: November 10, 2017

Professional ratings
Aggregate scores
Source	Rating
AnyDecentMusic?	7.3/10
Metacritic	79/100
Review scores
Source	Rating
AllMusic	3.5/5 stars
American Songwriter	3.5/5 stars
Clash	7/10
Drowned in Sound	7/10
Exclaim!	8/10
NME	4/5 stars
Pitchfork	7.9/10

Phases is a compilation album by American musician Angel Olsen. It was released November 10, 2017 through Jagjaguwar.

== Accolades ==
Publication	Accolade	Rank	Ref.
Crack Magazine	Top 100 Albums of 2017	36	
Gorilla Vs. Bear	Top 60 Albums of 2017	45	

== Track listing ==
All tracks are written by Angel Olsen, except where noted.

No.	Title	Length
1.	"Fly on Your Wall"	3:38
2.	"Special"	7:21
3.	"Only with You"	2:35
4.	"All Right Now"	2:59
5.	"Sans"	2:34
6.	"Sweet Dreams"	3:11
7.	"California"	3:49
8.	"Tougher Than the Rest" (writer: Bruce Springsteen)	3:31
9.	"For You" (writer: Roky Erickson)	1:54
10.	"How Many Disasters"	2:43
11.	"May as Well"	2:39
12.	"Endless Road" (writer: Hoyt Axton)	2:04
Total length:		38:58

== Charts ==
Chart	Peak position
US Folk Albums (Billboard)	7
US Top Rock Albums (Billboard)	46
UK Americana Albums (OCC)	4
UK Independent Albums (OCC)	7
UK Album Sales Chart (OCC)	98
