= Whole New Mess =

Studio album by Angel Olsen
- Released: August 28, 2020
- Recorded: October 2018
- Studio: The Unknown (Anacortes, Washington)
- Genres: Indie rock; indie folk
- Length: 42:05
- Label: Jagjaguwar
- Producers: Angel Olsen; Michael Harris

Angel Olsen chronology
All Mirrors (2019)	Whole New Mess (2020)	Big Time (2022)

Singles from Whole New Mess
- 1. "Whole New Mess" Released: July 28, 2020; 2. "Waving, Smiling" Released: August 18, 2020

Whole New Mess is a re-recording album by American singer-songwriter Angel Olsen, released on August 28, 2020 on Jagjaguwar. Recorded by Olsen and engineer Michael Harris in a converted church, the album features tracks from her fourth studio album All Mirrors (2019) arranged in a more intimate style, featuring the unreleased tracks "Whole New Mess" and "Waving, Smilling", which were released as singles.

== Recording ==
Whole New Mess was recorded over ten days in October 2018 with engineers Michael Harris and Nicholas Wilbur. The pair worked in isolation in Anacortes, Washington, notable as the hometown of independent musician Phil Elverum, recording in a converted Catholic church. Olsen would use the church's corridors to create a natural echo effect on her vocals.

The album was recorded prior to Olsen's 2019 studio album, All Mirrors, which features many of the same compositions in a different form: "When we made [Whole New Mess], I was still processing a lot of the songs, so for me, it’s harder to listen to this record than it is for me to listen to All Mirrors. When I recorded All Mirrors, other people had their hands in the pot, which separated me from the songs. I could get into them in a distant way. On Whole New Mess I’m feeling every feeling that they evoke."

== Composition ==
The album was written following the collapse of a romantic relationship, with Olsen noting: "I was really depressed. I had no idea whether the songs were good. They were just about my life. I could have recorded them at home and kept them as demos, but I knew Michael [Harris] was someone I could be depressed in front of, who would help me to explore it in different ways. It was such an emotional process."

== Critical reception ==
The album was critically acclaimed upon its release. At Metacritic, based on sixteen professional reviews, it received a weighted average score of 83 out of 100.

Professional ratings
Aggregate scores
Source	Rating
AnyDecentMusic?	7.6/10
Metacritic	83/100
Review scores
Source	Rating
AllMusic	4.5/5 stars
Consequence of Sound	B+
DIY	4/5 stars
Exclaim!	8/10
The Line of Best Fit	7.5/10
Loud and Quiet	9/10
NME	4/5 stars
Paste	7.0/10
Pitchfork	8.0/10
Rolling Stone	4/5 stars

== Track listing ==
All tracks are written by Angel Olsen.

Whole New Mess track listing
No.	Title	Length
1.	"Whole New Mess"	3:42
2.	"Too Easy (Bigger Than Us)"	2:32
3.	"(New Love) Cassette"	2:50
4.	"(We Are All Mirrors)"	2:36
5.	"(Summer Song)"	4:09
6.	"Waving, Smiling"	3:52
7.	"Tonight (Without You)"	4:01
8.	"Lark Song"	6:30
9.	"Impasse (Workin' for the Name)"	3:48
10.	"Chance (Forever Love)"	5:29
11.	"What It Is (What It Is)"	2:36
Total length:		42:05

== Personnel ==
- Angel Olsen – production
- Michael Harris – production, engineering
- Joe Lambert – mastering
- John Congleton – mixing
- Miles Johnson – art direction
- Kylie Coutts – photography

== Charts ==
Chart performance for Whole New Mess
Chart (2020)	Peak position
Portuguese Albums (AFP)	38
Scottish Albums (Official Charts)	29
Swiss Albums (Schweizer Hitparade)	98
UK Americana Albums (Official Charts)	1
UK Independent Albums (Official Charts)	10
UK Album Sales Chart (OCC)	37
