= Jenny O. =

American singer-songwriter

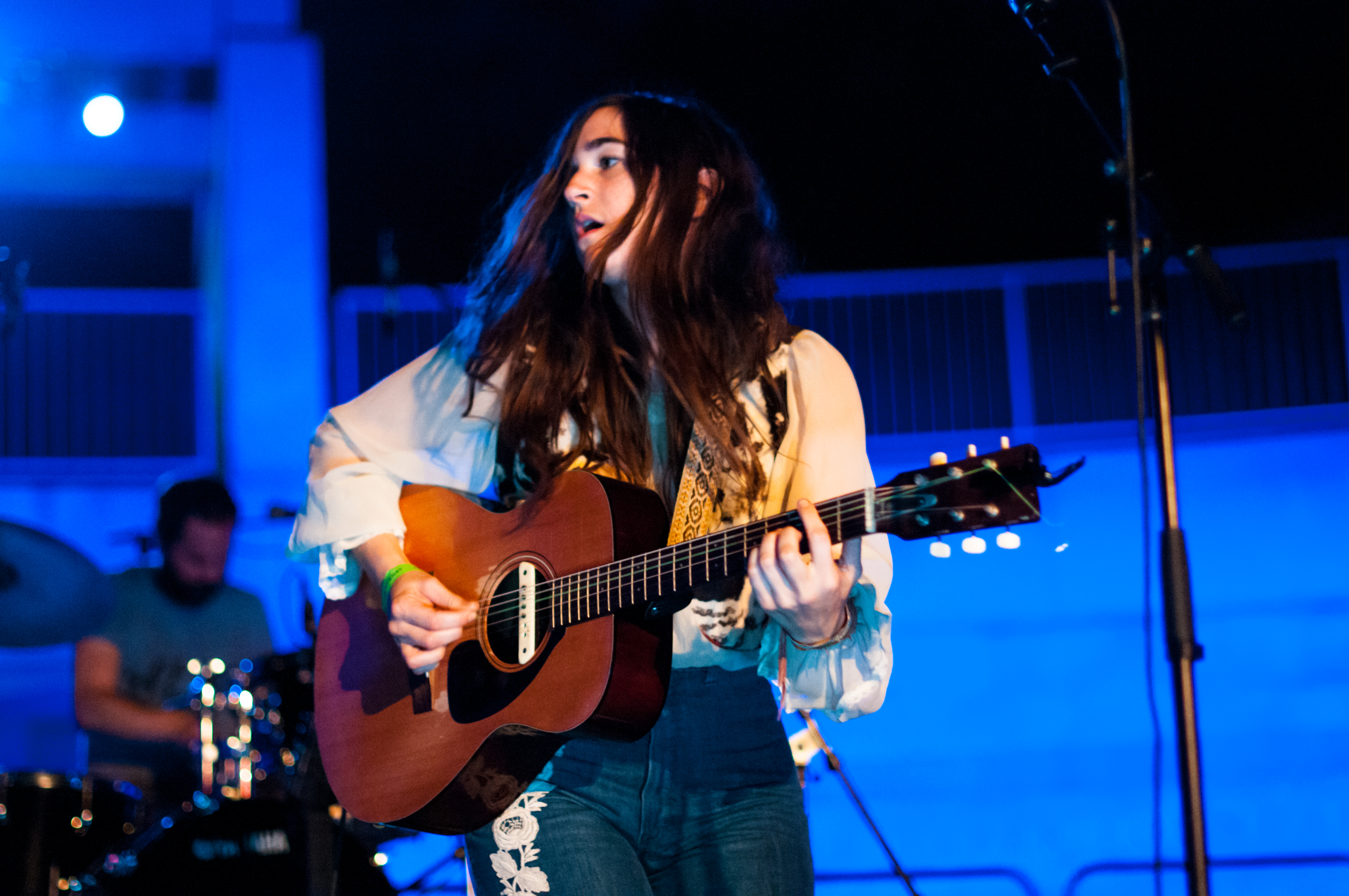

Background information
- Born: Jennifer Ognibene; Long Island, New York, United States
- Genres: Rock
- Occupation: Singer-songwriter
- Labels: Mama Bird Recording Co., Holy Trinity Records; Manimal Records
- Website: jennyo.com

Jennifer Ognibene, known by her stage name Jenny O., is an American singer-songwriter, based in Los Angeles, California.

== Early life and education ==
Jenny O. grew up on Long Island, New York. She studied jazz at State University of New York at New Paltz and Composition at State University of New York at Purchase Conservatory of Music.

== Career ==
=== 2010–2012: Home EP ===
In 2010, Jenny O. released a five-song EP of demo recordings titled Home. The first single, "Well OK Honey," appeared in the real-guitar-based video game Rocksmith, HBO's True Blood, and a television campaign by Toyota. In the same year, "Won't Let You Leave" was licensed by Subaru in a television campaign.

Jenny was a member of the LA Ladies Choir, who released one album, "Sing Joyfully" on Teenage Teardrops Records in 2010.

=== 2013: Automechanic and Holy Trinity Records ===
On February 5, 2013, Jenny O. released an album, Automechanic on her own label, Holy Trinity Records. The album was produced by Jonathan Wilson in Echo Park, Los Angeles and features James Gadson on drums.

=== 2016: Work EP ===
On October 7, 2016, Jenny O. released a second EP of demo recordings, titled Work. The first single, "Cheer Up Free Your Mind," was re-recorded in Simlish for The Sims 4 video game. "Case Study B" plays in Episode 605 of Orange Is The New Black.

=== 2017–2019: Peace & Information ===
Peace & Information, Jenny O.’s second album, was produced by Jonathan Wilson and released August 4, 2017 on Holy Trinity Records. The song "Trauma Jules" was licensed by the U.S. television series Shameless. "Power & Charm" appears in Riverdale. The song "If You're Lonely" is heard over the closing credits of Season 2, Episode 8 of the Bravo series Imposters.

=== 2020: New Truth ===
Jenny O.'s third album, New Truth, produced by Kevin Ratterman, was released August 7, 2020.

=== 2023: Spectra ===
Jenny O.'s fourth album, Spectra, produced by Kevin Ratterman, was released February 23, 2023.

=== Singles and compilations ===
- "Get Down For The Holidays", The Christmas Gig, a Target holiday compilation, 2010.
- "I'm Gonna Love You Too" by Buddy Holly, Rave On Buddy Holly, Fantasy Records/Concord Music Group, 2011.
- "The Happiest Days of Our Lives/Another Brick In The Wall, Part 2", by Pink Floyd, Cool For School, Manimal Vinyl, 2014.
- "Ragtime Queen", Fraggle Rock – Dream a Dream and See, Beta-Petrol, 2013.
- "1941," This Is The Town – A Tribute To Harry Nilsson (Volume 1), Royal Potato Family, 2014.
- "Waterfalls" by TLC produced for the television series, Grey's Anatomy Holy Trinity Records, 2015.
- "Can't Seem to Make You Mine" by The Seeds, Holy Trinity Records, 2019.
- "Not My President," Holy Trinity Records, 2020.

=== Television and film ===
On December 12, 2013, Jenny O. appeared with her band, Jenny O. & the High Society, on Last Call with Carson Daly, performing "Seashells" and "Automechanic." They appeared again on the show March 13, 2014 to perform "Lazy Jane" and "Learned My Lessons."

Jenny O. recorded a version of "Lucky" by songwriter Kat Edmonson for a Coca-Cola television campaign which aired during the 2014 Winter Olympics.

In 2014, she performed the theme song for the ABC television series Selfie.

=== Background vocals ===
Jenny O. provided vocals on the following recordings:

- "Funtimes In Babylon," Father John Misty, Fear Fun, 2012.
- "'99," Harper Simon, Division Street, 2013.
- "Hummingbird," Bonnie "Prince" Billy, by Leon Russell, 2014.
- "I'll See You Again," Bonnie 'Prince' Billy, by Roy Harper, 2014.
- "Moses Pain," Jonathan Wilson, Fanfare, Bella Union, 2015.
- "Stone Cold Daddy-O," Jonny Fritz, Sweet Creep, ATO, 2016.
- Richard Edwards, Lemon Cotton Candy Sunset, Joyful Noise, 2017.
- "Sylvie," Leslie Stevens, Thirty Tigers, Sinner, 2019.

=== Touring ===
In 2011, Jenny O. toured the U.S. West Coast with Ben Harper, Leon Russell, and Father John Misty. In 2013, she toured the U.S. and Europe with Sixto Rodriguez. She has subsequently toured with The Proclaimers, Rodrigo Amarante, Rhett Miller, Dar Williams, Joe Purdy, Robert Ellis, The Wild Reeds, Radical Face, and Faye Webster. Jenny O. has also opened for Violent Femmes, Tegan and Sara, Wanda Jackson, Adam Green, and Jenny Lewis.

== See also ==
- List of Manimal Vinyl artists
- List of people from New York (state)
- List of people from Los Angeles
- List of State University of New York at Purchase people
- List of singer-songwriters
