= Burn Your Fire for No Witness =

Studio album by Angel Olsen
- Released: February 17, 2014
- Genres: Indie rock; indie folk; alternative country
- Length: 44:20; 60:17 (deluxe edition)
- Label: Jagjaguwar
- Producer: John Congleton

Angel Olsen chronology
Half Way Home (2012)	Burn Your Fire for No Witness (2014)	My Woman (2016)

Burn Your Fire for No Witness is the second studio album by American singer-songwriter Angel Olsen. It was released in February 2014 under Jagjaguwar Records. "Forgiven/Forgotten", "Hi-Five" and "Windows" were released as singles. A deluxe edition was released on November 18, 2014, with five additional tracks.

== Critical reception ==
Professional ratings
Aggregate scores
Source	Rating
AnyDecentMusic?	8.2/10
Metacritic	84/100
Review scores
Source	Rating
AllMusic	4/5 stars
The A.V. Club	B+
The Daily Telegraph	5/5 stars
The Guardian	4/5 stars
Mojo	4/5 stars
NME	9/10
Pitchfork	8.3/10
Q	4/5 stars
Rolling Stone	3/5 stars
Spin	7/10

Burn Your Fire for No Witness garnered broadly positive reviews from critics. Turntable Kitchen called it "spellbinding and beautifully composed," while further describing it as "an album spilling over with heart-swelling and painfully visceral romance." The A.V. Club named it the best album of 2014. The Village Voice's Pazz & Jop annual critics' poll named Burn Your Fire for No Witness the eighth-best album of 2014.

In December 2019, Pitchfork listed Burn Your Fire for No Witness as the 26th best album of the decade.

== Track listing ==
All tracks are written by Angel Olsen, except where noted.

No.	Title	Length
1.	"Unfucktheworld"	2:05
2.	"Forgiven/Forgotten"	2:03
3.	"Hi-Five"	2:57
4.	"White Fire"	6:55
5.	"High & Wild"	3:53
6.	"Lights Out"	4:27
7.	"Stars"	4:38
8.	"Iota"	3:27
9.	"Dance Slow Decades"	4:05
10.	"Enemy"	5:43
11.	"Windows"	4:07
Total length:		44:20

Deluxe edition bonus tracks
No.	Title	Length
12.	"White Water"	5:40
13.	"All Right Now"	2:59
14.	"Only with You"	2:35
15.	"May as Well"	2:39
16.	"Endless Road" (Hoyt Axton)	2:04
Total length:		60:17

== Charts ==
Chart (2014)	Peak position
Belgian Albums (Ultratop Flanders)	81
Belgian Albums (Ultratop Wallonia)	55
French Albums (SNEP)	146
UK Albums (Official Charts)	64
UK Independent Albums (Official Charts)	13
US Billboard 200	71
US Independent Albums (Billboard)	16
US Top Alternative Albums (Billboard)	12
US Top Rock Albums (Billboard)	19
