= Jacqueline Suskin =

American poet and performance artist

- Born: Michigan, United States
- Education: BA in English, Creative Writing and Poetry
- Occupations: Poet, educator, performance artist
- Known for: Poem Store
- Website: www.jacquelinesuskin.com

Jacqueline Suskin is an American poet, educator, and performance artist.

== Early life and education ==
Suskin was born in Royal Oak, Michigan, and raised in Big Pine Key, Florida. She attended Florida State University, where she studied English with a concentration in creative writing and poetry, and graduated in 2007.

== Career ==
Suskin has developed a career as an author of poetry and creative nonfiction. Her books have been published by independent presses, including Ten Speed Press, Rare Bird Books, Sounds True, Write Bloody Publishing, and Flower Press. Suskin became nationally known through Poem Store, a project she started in 2009, in which she writes custom poems for people in public spaces using a manual typewriter, where participants suggest a topic and make a donation, and Suskin creates a new poem on the spot, often reading it out loud. Suskin has also worked as a teaching artist, workshop leader, and educator. From 2019 to 2021, she served as artist-in-residence at Folklife Farm, where she founded a retreat program for writers and artists.

Suskin has written commissioned and collaborative poetry for public figures including Oprah Winfrey, Maria Shriver, Drew Barrymore, Cheryl Strayed, and Gwyneth Paltrow. She has collaborated with companies and brands including Nike, PayPal, Gartner, Inc., Alice + Olivia, Nasty Gal, and the Standard Hotels as part of a project to bring poetry into public and commercial spaces.

== Recognition ==
Suskin was honored by Michelle Obama at the White House for her work as a Turnaround Artist. Her work has been featured in New York Times, T Magazine, Los Angeles Times, Man Repeller, Reader’s Digest, Better Homes & Gardens, and Huffington Post. A feature in the Los Angeles Times called Suskin a "poet for the people." Time Out Los Angeles referred to her as a "people's poet laureate," highlighting her work at the Hollywood Farmers Market.
