= Gentle Spirit =

Studio album by Jonathan Wilson
- Released: September 13, 2011
- Recorded: 2008–2010; Canyonstereo, Los Angeles, CA
- Genre: Folk, psychedelic
- Length: 78:19
- Label: Bella Union
- Producer: Jonathan Wilson

Jonathan Wilson chronology
Frankie Ray (2007)	Gentle Spirit (2011)	Pity Trials and Tomorrow's Child (2012)

Gentle Spirit is the first official studio album released by Los Angeles artist Jonathan Wilson. It was released in the United Kingdom and Europe on August 8, 2011, and in the United States on September 13, 2011, on Bella Union and received the No. 4 spot on Mojo Magazine's 2011 Best of Albums of the Year. The album was recorded at Wilson's former studio in Laurel Canyon and mixed at his new studio in Echo Park.

== Overview ==
Wilson crafted the album at his former studio, Canyonstereo, in Laurel Canyon between tours, album producer jobs, recording sessions and jams, a period in which Wilson collaborated with the likes of Elvis Costello, Chris Robinson, Phil Lesh, Erykah Badu, Benmont Tench, Gary Louris, Vetiver, Dawes and many other notable musicians.

While the album was started a few years earlier, Wilson chose not to release Gentle Spirit until 2011. As a result, Gentle Spirit traded among Wilson's friends and family on sharpie-labeled CDRs for several years and in the process, built a large underground following that included many notable musicians, including Jackson Browne, Robbie Robertson and Elvis Costello. As journalist Martin Aston notes in his BBC Music review, "Wilson may be a new name to us but to the cognoscenti of America's alt-roots scene he's a mover and shaker."

Not until Wilson was introduced to Simon Raymonde and Bella Union, did he decide to officially release the album.

The album's underlying theme has to do with the words of the title track, "Gentle Spirit", about the desensitization caused by daily exposure to mankind's despair. Gentle Spirit discusses taking the time to give humanity a reverence-laden soundtrack of sorts. As Andy Gill of The Independent notes, "This concern, about how to reconcile one's desire for inner peace with our rage at worldly events, runs through the album."

Gentle Spirit features all original Wilson compositions, with the exception of his rendition of Gordon Lightfoot's "The Way I Feel".

The song "Gentle Spirit" was recorded live during sessions for the BBC's Old Grey Whistle Test 40th Anniversary.

The song "Desert Raven" was used to close Tycho's 2016 Burning Man DJ set.

== Acclaim ==
Professional ratings
Aggregate scores
Source	Rating
Metacritic	76/100
Review scores
Source	Rating
AllMusic	3.5/5 stars
BBC Music	8/10 stars
Financial Times	4/5 stars
The Guardian	4/5 stars
The Independent	4/5 stars
Mojo	4/5 stars
NME	8/10 stars
Q	3/5 stars
The Times	4/5 stars
Uncut	4/5 stars

Gentle Spirit was met with generally favorable reviews from critics. At Metacritic, which assigns a weighted average rating out of 100 to reviews from mainstream publications, this release received an average score of 76, based on 15 reviews.

Concluding the review for AllMusic, Thom Jurek claimed that "Despite its massive length, Gentle Spirit lives up to its title; it's an easy, breezy, endearing listen with plenty of seductive earworms to draw the listener down a sonic rabbit hole and into another world temporarily." In the review for The Guardian, Caroline Sullivan claimed that "Gentle Spirit engagingly takes up where the Graham Nashes and Joni Mitchells left off, with only the odd splash of electronics proving it was made this decade." Concluding the review for NME, Rebecca Schiller stated that "As California Dreamin' goes, this is almost as good as heading for the hills, reaching for a hand-tooled native American bong and calling yourself Moon Unit."

Uncut leads off its review by introducing Wilson as "the new king of Laurel Canyon". Throughout the course of his review, Uncut's James Mulvey states that, "Gentle Spirit illustrates a more prosaic act of creation, in which fastidious study is transformed into compelling new music." Mojo acknowledges Wilson's craftmanship throughout by saying, "The pursuit of authenticity and eye for detail stretches to Wilson's production techniques" as the album was recorded to analog tape. Kathleen Johnson of Vintage Guitar described the album as a "a hippie-soul drenched 80 minutes of folk-psych-rock goodness".

The album received high marks in the 2011 End of Year polls as well, including earning No. 4 in Mojo, No. 16 in Uncut, No. 28 in The Guardian.

== Track listing ==
All songs written by Jonathan Wilson (except "The Way I Feel" written by Gordon Lightfoot).

1. "Gentle Spirit" – 6:27
2. "Can We Really Party Today?" – 6:41
3. "Desert Raven" – 7:58
4. "Canyon in the Rain" – 6:27
5. "Natural Rhapsody" – 8:21
6. "Ballad of the Pines" – 4:00
7. "The Way I Feel" – 4:07
8. "Don't Give Your Heart to a Rambler" – 3:47
9. "Woe Is Me" – 6:22
10. "Waters Down" – 3:46
11. "Rolling Universe" – 3:25
12. "Magic Everywhere" – 6:26
13. "Valley of the Silver Moon" – 10:32
14. "Morning Tree" – 6:20 (Bonus Track)
15. "Bohemia" – 6:13 (Bonus Track)

== Personnel ==
"Gentle Spirit"

- Jonathan Wilson – All Instruments & Vocals

"Can We Really Party Today?"

- Jonathan Wilson – Vocals, Guitar, Piano, Percussion, Mellotron
- Colin Laroque – Drums
- Johnathan Rice – Backing Vocals

"Desert Raven"

- Jonathan Wilson – All Instruments & Vocals

"Canyon in the Rain"

- Jonathan Wilson – All Instruments & Vocals

"Natural Rhapsody"

- Jonathan Wilson – All Instruments & Vocals

"Ballad of the Pines"

- Jonathan Wilson – All Instruments & Vocals
- Chris Robinson – Backing Vocals
- Neal Schofield – Backing Vocals

"The Way I Feel"

- Jonathan Wilson – Vocals, Guitar, Bass, Percussion
- Otto Hauser – Drums
- Adam MacDougall – Organ
- Johnathan Rice – Backing Vocals

"Don't Give Your Heart to a Rambler"

- Jonathan Wilson – Vocals, Guitar, Organ, Percussion, Vibes
- Brian Geltner – Drums
- Kenny Siegel – Bass

"Woe is Me"

- Jonathan Wilson – Vocals, Guitar, Bass, Organ
- Otto Hauser – Drums

"Waters Down"

- Jonathan Wilson – Vocals, Guitar, Bass, Piano, Fuzz Bass, Mellotron, Percussion
- Andy Cabic – Backing Vocals
- Adam MacDougall – Organ
- Josh Grange – Pedal Steel

"Rolling Universe"

- Jonathan Wilson – All Instruments & Vocals

"Magic Everywhere"

- Jonathan Wilson – All Instruments & Vocals

"Valley of the Silver Moon"

- Jonathan Wilson – Vocals, Guitar, Bass, Percussion
- Adam MacDougall – Organ
- Otto Hauser – Drums
- Andy Cabic – Harmonium, Percussion
- Produced and Engineered by Jonathan Wilson at Canyonstereo in Los Angeles; Assisted by Brett Detar
- Mixed by Jonathan Wilson and Thom Monahan at The Hangar Studios in Sacramento, California; Assisted by Bryce Gonzalez
- Mastered by JJ Golden at Golden Mastering in Ventura, California
