= Strange Cacti =

- Reissue cover artwork

EP by Angel Olsen
- Released: 2010
- Genres: Americana; indie folk
- Label: Bathetic

Angel Olsen chronology
Strange Cacti (2010)	Lady of the Waterpark (2010)

Strange Cacti is the debut extended play (EP) by American singer-songwriter and musician Angel Olsen. Originally released on cassette in 2010, it was later reissued by Bathetic Records in 2011. The record consists of six tracks of Americana and indie folk, featuring only vocals and guitar.

== Critical reception ==
Professional ratings
Review scores
Source	Rating
AllMusic	3.5/5 stars
Under the Radar	7/10

AllMusic critic Marcy Donelson thought that "her [Olsen's] ability to write expressive melodies and to deliver raw lyrics with clumsy sincerity and unusual technique gives Olsen the potential to be downright fascinating to others." Under the Radar's Frank Valish wrote: "Putting the needle down on the record feels like setting down an old Dinah Washington 78 RPM, with Olsen's gloriously emotive voice serenading through a smoky haze as if from another world, at once enchanting and mysterious."

== Track listing ==
1. "Tiniest Lights"
2. "If It's Alive, It Will"
3. "So That We Can Be Still"
4. "Drunk and With Dreams"
5. "Some Things Cosmic"
6. "Creator, Destroyer"
