= My Woman (album) =

Studio album by Angel Olsen
- Released: September 2, 2016
- Studio: Vox (Los Angeles)
- Genre: Indie rock
- Length: 47:17
- Label: Jagjaguwar
- Producers: Justin Raisen; Angel Olsen

Angel Olsen chronology
Burn Your Fire for No Witness (2014)	My Woman (2016)	Phases (2017)

Singles from My Woman
- 1. "Intern" Released: June 1, 2016; 2. "Shut Up Kiss Me" Released: June 29, 2016; 3. "Sister" Released: August 24, 2016

My Woman (stylized as MY WOMAN) is the third studio album by American singer-songwriter Angel Olsen, released on September 2, 2016, by Jagjaguwar Records. Produced by Olsen and Justin Raisen, the album was accompanied by music videos for the tracks, "Intern", "Shut Up Kiss Me", and "Sister" all co-directed or directed by Olsen.

== Production ==
=== Recording ===
My Woman was recorded at Vox Studios in Los Angeles with producer Justin Raisen. The album was structured as sides of a vinyl record: "On one side, it’s as if you were having an upbeat day and wanted to try something a little hectic. But then, if you feel like things were slowing down and you wanted to be more reflective, then you listen to Side B." With regard to the album's themes, Olsen said that My Woman addresses "the complicated mess of being a woman."

=== Music ===
My Woman was Olsen's attempt to expand her musical style after 2014's Burn Your Fire for No Witness, with emphasis on avoiding being typecast as a lo-fi indie artist. With what she called a "plurality of voices," Olsen "wanted to use [her] vocal more and sing in the styles that [she] liked."

Compared to Olsen's previous album, My Woman contains a poppier, more diverse sound. Musical genres and musicians that influenced the album includes Fleetwood Mac, The Shirelles, Crazy Horse, 1970s glam rock, 1960s country pop and grunge. The album's opening track, "Intern," is a synthpop song that was considered to be a major departure from Olsen's previous works. Written as an experiment to "fuck with people," Olsen said of "Intern," "I have some friends who make synth music and I thought it might be fun to do something sarcastic." Critics have compared "Never Be Mine" to 1960s jangle pop and Portuguese guitar music. The album's closer, "Pops," is a piano ballad.

== Promotion ==
=== Singles ===
The first single from the album, "Intern," was released on June 1, 2016. A music video directed by Olsen was released the same day. On June 6, 2016, My Woman was announced. The second single from the album, "Shut Up Kiss Me," along with an accompanying Olsen-directed music video, was released on June 29. It charted on the Billboard Adult Alternative Songs chart for six weeks, peaking at position 22. The third single from the album, "Sister," along with an accompanying Olsen directed music video, was released on August 24.

== Critical reception ==
Professional ratings
Aggregate scores
Source	Rating
AnyDecentMusic?	8.4/10
Metacritic	87/100
Review scores
Source	Rating
AllMusic	4.5/5 stars
The A.V. Club	A−
Chicago Tribune	3.5/4 stars
The Guardian	4/5 stars
Mojo	4/5 stars
NME	4/5
The Observer	5/5 stars
Pitchfork	8.8/10
Q	4/5 stars
Rolling Stone	3.5/5 stars

My Woman received widespread acclaim from critics. At Metacritic, the album received an average score of 87 based on 30 professional reviews, which indicates "universal acclaim".

Pitchfork's Jenn Pelly gave the album a Best New Music designation, writing "Angel Olsen's latest is her best record yet, a bracing mix of sounds and styles congealing around songs of pain, sadness, and hope." Matt Williams of The A.V. Club gave the album a grade of A−, writing "When Olsen broke through with...Burn Your Fire For No Witness...she was quickly pigeonholed as the Sad Girl...With My Woman, Olsen obliterates that narrow perception, raising the bar on her own multifaceted output and building new aspects of her artistic identity in the process." PopMatters' Colin Fitzgerald called My Woman "a new watermark for Olsen" that "elaborates on the disparate missions of both Half Way Home and Burn Your Fire for No Witness while reaching out into the unfamiliar spaces of dreamy synthpop and more hook-driven, pop-oriented songwriting." Fitzgerald added "most remarkable thing about My Woman is that it all coheres (far better than Burn Your Fire for No Witness, as great as it was, ever did) into an expansive, all-encompassing vision." Record Collector gave the album a mixed review, writing "My Woman is an odd, somewhat mismatched collection of good and then great songs that could have been more ghostly. When played simplest, or with the least traditional band structure buffeting them, they’re at their best – but it’s sadly not a constant."

In November 2016, UK record chain HMV named My Woman as its album of the year, calling it "an intuitively smart, warmly communicative and fearlessly generous record".

In November 2026, Pitchfork placed My Woman at the 90th position on their list of "The 100 Best Indie Rock Albums of All Time".

=== Accolades ===
Publication	Accolade	Year	Rank	Ref.
The A.V. Club	The A.V. Club's Top 50 Albums of 2016	2016	3	
Billboard	Billboard's 50 Best Albums of 2016	2016	28	
Entertainment Weekly	The 50 Best Albums of 2016	2016	33	
Gothamist	The Best Albums of 2016	2016	10	
The Guardian	The Best Albums of 2016	2016	21	
Mojo	The 50 Best Albums of 2016	2016	28	
NME	NME's Albums of the Year 2016	2016	13	
NPR Music	Best 50 Albums of 2016	2016	25	
Paste	The 50 Best Albums of 2016	2016	7	
Pitchfork	The 20 Best Rock Albums of 2016	2016	—N/a	
Pitchfork	The 50 Best Albums of 2016	2016	9	
Red Bull	Red Bull's 25 Best Albums of 2016	2016	5	
Rolling Stone	50 Best Albums of 2016	2016	34	
Rough Trade	Albums of the Year	2016	8	
The Skinny	Top 50 Albums of 2016	2016	5	
Stereogum	The 50 Best Albums of 2016	2016	7	
Time	The Top 10 Best Albums of 2016	2016	4	

== Track listing ==
All tracks are written by Angel Olsen.

No.	Title	Length
1.	"Intern"	2:46
2.	"Never Be Mine"	3:41
3.	"Shut Up Kiss Me"	3:22
4.	"Give It Up"	2:56
5.	"Not Gonna Kill You"	4:57
6.	"Heart Shaped Face"	5:32
7.	"Sister"	7:45
8.	"Those Were the Days"	4:19
9.	"Woman"	7:37
10.	"Pops"	4:41
Total length:		47:17

== Charts ==
Chart (2016–17)	Peak position
Australian Albums (ARIA)	29
Belgian Albums (Ultratop Flanders)	36
Belgian Albums (Ultratop Wallonia)	112
Dutch Albums (Album Top 100)	122
French Albums (SNEP)	185
Irish Albums (IRMA)	43
New Zealand Heatseekers Albums (RMNZ)	1
Portuguese Albums (AFP)	38
Scottish Albums (Official Charts)	23
Spanish Albums (Promusicae)	84
Swiss Albums (Schweizer Hitparade)	58
UK Albums (Official Charts)	40
UK Independent Albums (Official Charts)	10
US Billboard 200	47
US Independent Albums (Billboard)	4
US Top Alternative Albums (Billboard)	4
US Top Rock Albums (Billboard)	4

== Personnel ==
- Angel Olsen – vocals, inside photo, production
- Chris Allgood – assistant
- Stewart Bronaugh – main personnel
- Collin Dupuis – mixing
- Emily Elhaj – main personnel
- Michael Harris – engineering
- Joshua Jaeger – main personnel
- Miles Johnson – design
- Seth Kauffman – main personnel
- Emily Lazar – mastering
- Amanda Marsalis – cover photo, inside photo
- Lisa Nance – cover painting
- Justin Raisen – engineering, main personnel, production
- Lawrence Rothman – additional production
