= Angel Olsen =

American musician (born 1987)

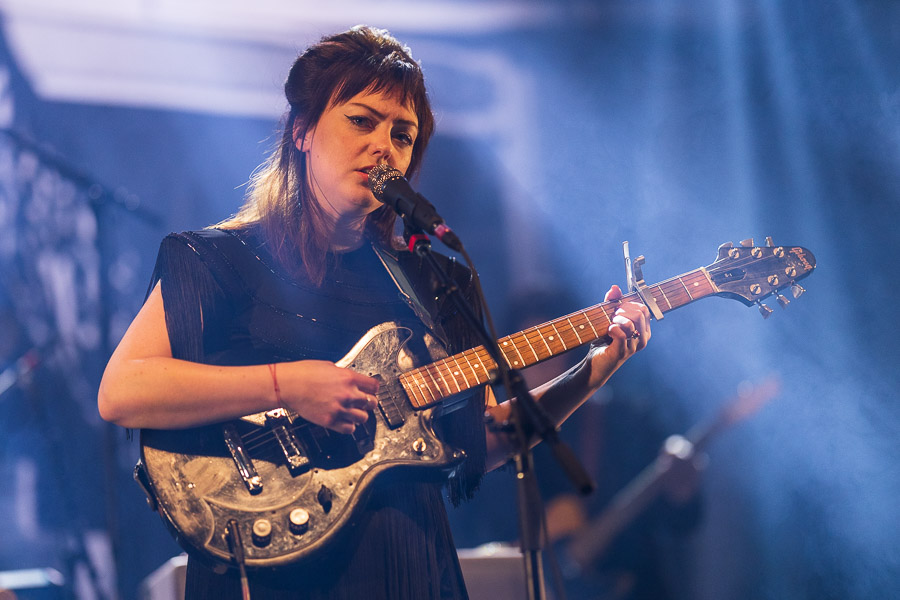
- Olsen performing live at Rockefeller in Oslo, Norway, 2020

Background information
- Born: Angelina Marie Carroll; January 22, 1987 (age 39); St. Louis, Missouri, U.S.
- Origin: Chicago, Illinois, U.S.
- Genres: Art pop; indie folk; indie rock; alternative country
- Occupations: Singer-songwriter; musician; record producer
- Instruments: Vocals; guitar; keyboards
- Years active: 2009–present
- Labels: Jagjaguwar; Bathetic

Angel Olsen (born Angelina Marie Carroll; January 22, 1987) is an American singer-songwriter from St. Louis, Missouri who lives in Asheville, North Carolina.

To date, Olsen has released six studio albums: Half Way Home (2012), Burn Your Fire for No Witness (2014), My Woman (2016), All Mirrors (2019), Whole New Mess (2020), and Big Time (2022).

== Early life and education ==
Angel Olsen was born on January 22, 1987, in St. Louis, Missouri. At age three, Olsen was adopted by a foster family that had cared for her since shortly after her birth. The difference in years between her and her parents left an impression. "Because there are so many decades of difference between us, I became more interested in what their childhood was like," she says of her parents, both of whom died in 2021. "I fantasized about what it was like to be young in the '30s and '50s, more so than other kids my age." Olsen explained that "my mother just has this capacity for children."

Despite early adolescent aspirations to be a "pop star", her interests later shifted in high school. Olsen became more introverted, regularly attending punk rock and noise music shows at the Lemp Neighborhood Arts Center and the Creepy Crawl as well as Christian rock shows throughout the city. She began learning the piano and guitar and writing her own music. At the age of 16, she joined a local band called Good Fight, self-described as "a meeting of early No Doubt and punk rock." Two years after graduating from Tower Grove Christian Academy, Olsen moved to Chicago.

She befriended country rock singer-songwriter Bonnie "Prince" Billy, who invited her to go on tour as his backing vocalist.

== Career ==
=== 2011–2014: Strange Cacti and Half Way Home ===
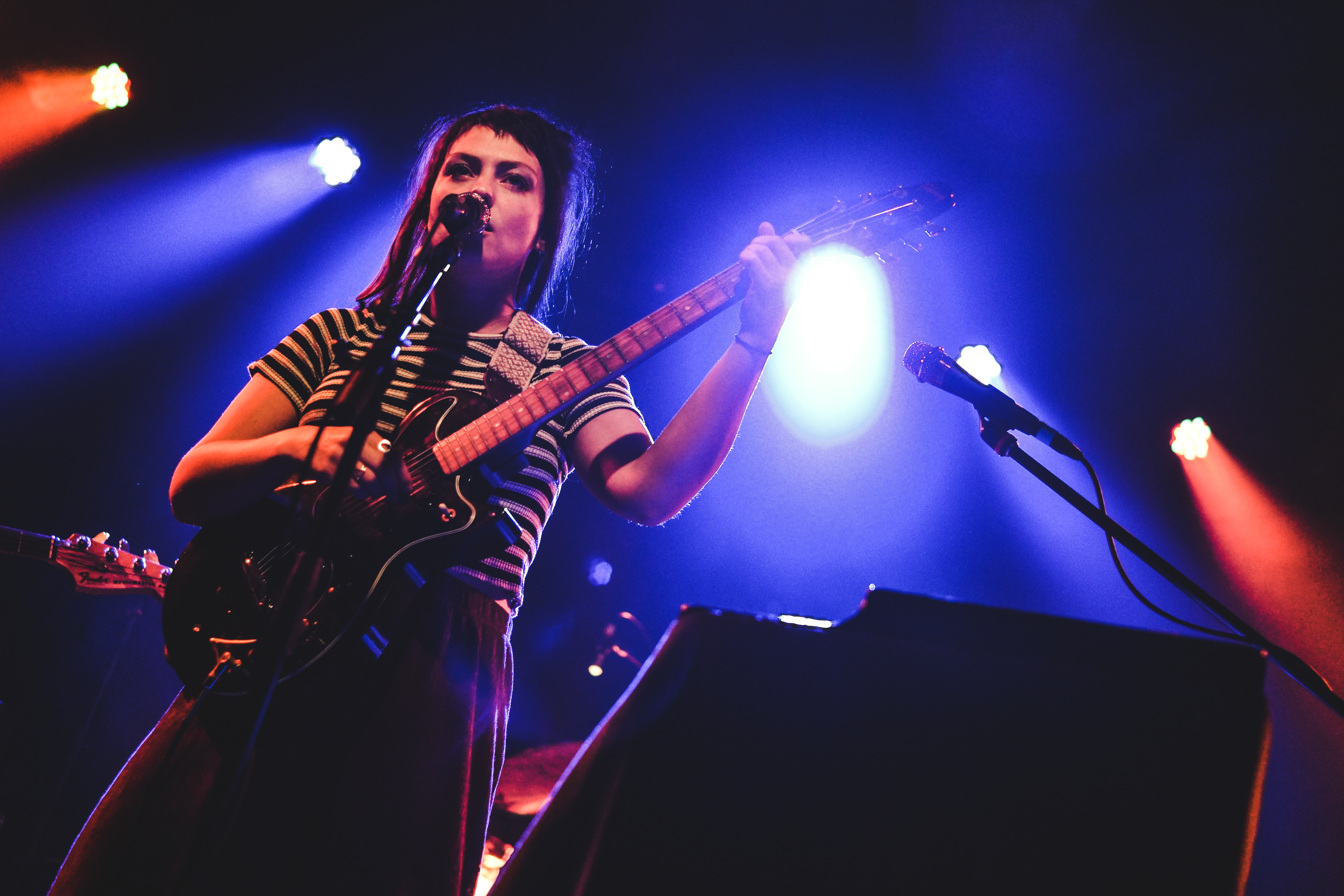
Olsen performing live at the Sinclair in Cambridge, Massachusetts, 2016

Olsen released her debut EP, Strange Cacti in 2011, and her debut studio album, Half Way Home, in 2012, on Bathetic Records. In addition to her work with Bonnie "Prince" Billy and the Cairo Gang, Olsen has collaborated with a number of other notable figures of American indie rock, including Tim Kinsella of Cap'n Jazz, LeRoy Bach of Wilco and Cass McCombs. Her collaboration with Kinsella and Bach, as well as with Chicago poet Marvin Tate, resulted in the album Tim Kinsella Sings the Songs of Marvin Tate by Leroy Bach Featuring Angel Olsen which the group released on Indianapolis label Joyful Noise Recordings on December 3, 2013.

=== 2014–2017: Burn Your Fire for No Witness and My Woman ===
Olsen signed a recording contract with Jagjaguwar, ahead of her first full-band record, Burn Your Fire for No Witness, which was released on February 17, 2014. The closing track of the album, "Windows", was featured in the final episode in the first season of the Netflix original series 13 Reasons Why in 2017.

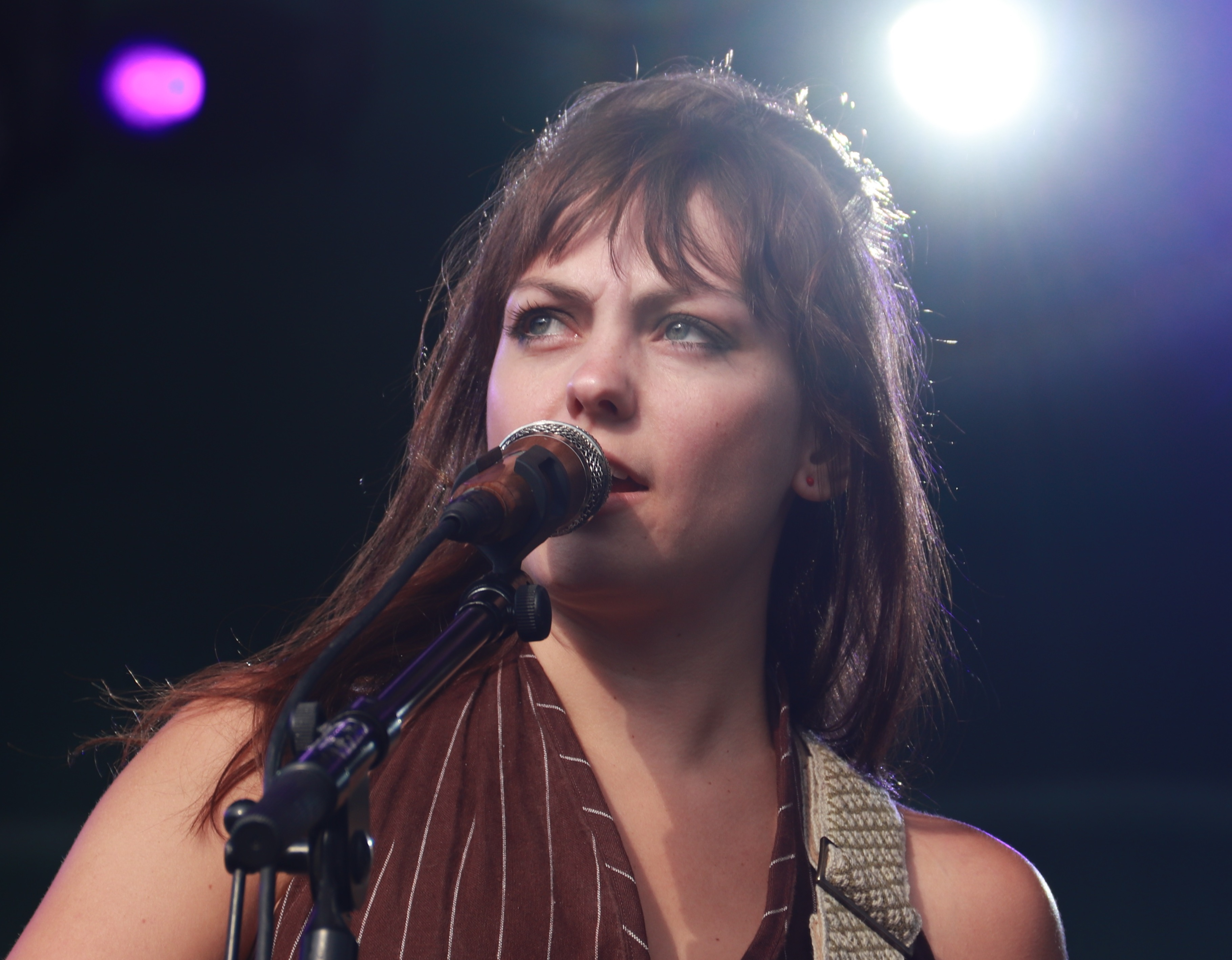
Olsen performing live at Pitchfork Music Festival 2017 in Chicago, Illinois, 2017

Olsen's third studio album, My Woman, was released on September 2, 2016. In a review for Consequence of Sound, critic Ciara Dolan described the album as a "startling record of unimpeachable strength and honesty", while Pitchfork's Jenn Pelly described it as "her best record yet".

On November 10, 2017, Olsen released the compilation album Phases, including b-sides and bonus tracks. The album was preceded by the lead single "Fly on Your Wall".

=== 2019–2021: All Mirrors, Whole New Mess, Songs of the Lark and Other Far Memories and Aisles ===
Olsen's fourth studio album, All Mirrors, was released on October 4, 2019, to critical acclaim. Laura Snapes of Pitchfork described the album as "breathtaking", and a "strong wind" that blows in and "leaves you undone", while Alexis Petridis of The Guardian described it as "challenging and intriguing", and Luke Saunders of Happy Mag described it as a change of "theatric transcendency", when compared to her previous releases. The same year, British producer Mark Ronson featured Olsen on his fifth studio album Late Night Feelings, on the track "True Blue".

In 2020, Olsen released several remixes of popular releases. On April 9, Olsen released a remix of "All Mirrors" produced by Chromatics' Johnny Jewel. On June 3, Olsen released a remix of "New Love Cassette" produced by Mark Ronson. On August 28, Olsen released her fifth studio album Whole New Mess through Jagjaguwar. The album features tracks from All Mirrors arranged in a more intimate style and would earn her the Best Folk/Bluegrass Record at the 2021 Libera Awards by the American Association of Independent Music. The same year, Olsen worked on a cover of "Mr. Lonely", originally by Bobby Vinton, for the film Kajillionaire directed by Miranda July. She also collaborated with film composer Emile Mosseri on the cover which was released on September 16, and was included in the soundtrack.

On March 30, 2021, Olsen announced a special edition box set titled Songs of the Lark and Other Far Memories, which contains her previous two studio albums All Mirrors and Whole New Mess alongside demos, re-workings, remixes and covers to close this chapter of her career, released via Jagjaguwar. It was announced with the lead single "It's Every Season [Whole New Mess]" and was released on May 7. On May 20, Olsen released a single with Sharon Van Etten, "Like I Used To", which was produced by John Congleton. Olsen and Van Etten appear in the music video with their hair styled in similar shag haircuts. On August 20, Olsen released her fourth extended play, Aisles, consisting of cover versions of popular 1980s songs by artists including Laura Branigan, Billy Idol, OMD, and Alphaville. Pitchfork writer Evan Rytlewski described it as "an unusual departure for a songwriter who's always staked everything on her conviction".

=== 2022–present: Big Time and Forever Means ===
Olsen's sixth studio album, Big Time, was released on June 3, 2022. The album was preceded by the lead single "All the Good Times", and followed by a second single, the title track "Big Time". On April 14, 2023, Olsen released her fifth EP, Forever Means, containing four previously unreleased tracks originally recorded for Big Time.

== Style ==
Pitchfork has likened her album All Mirrors to acts such as the Cure, Cocteau Twins and Siouxsie and the Banshees, saying that she has created a dark dream-pop dealing with anxiety. Olsen plays a vintage Gibson S-1 guitar from 1979.

== Personal life ==
On April 16, 2021, Olsen stated she was gay. In 2022, Olsen revealed that her relationship with partner Beau Thibodeaux had ended, and that she had dated long-time friend and musician Meg Duffy for a few months in 2020. In a 2022 interview, Olsen stated she now identifies as pansexual, and in August 2023 celebrated one year with boyfriend and singer-songwriter Maxim Ludwig. Ludwig co-directed the lyric video for Olsen's song "Nothing's Free", additionally serving as a support act on her 2023 North American tour. In 2024, Olsen and Ludwig married.

== Discography ==
Studio albums

- Half Way Home (2012)
- Burn Your Fire for No Witness (2014)
- My Woman (2016)
- All Mirrors (2019)
- Big Time (2022)

== Awards and nominations ==
Year	Award	Category	Nominee(s)	Result	Ref.
2014	Libera Awards	Up and Comer Artist Award	Burn Your Fire for No Witness	Won	
2016	The Daily Californian Art Awards	Best Non-Billboard Song	"Shut Up Kiss Me"	Nominated	
2017	Libera Awards	Album of the Year	My Woman	Won	
2017	Libera Awards	Best Live Act	Herself	Nominated	
2017	Libera Awards	Video of the Year	"Shut Up Kiss Me"	Nominated	
2017	Libera Awards	Video of the Year (Fan Vote)	"Shut Up Kiss Me"	Nominated	
2017	AIM Awards	Independent Breakthrough of the Year	Herself	Nominated	
2020	Libera Awards	Album of the Year	All Mirrors	Nominated	
2020	Libera Awards	Best Alternative Rock Album	All Mirrors	Nominated	
2021	Libera Awards	Best Folk/Bluegrass Album	Whole New Mess	Nominated	
2022	Libera Awards	Video of the Year	"Like I Used To" (with Sharon Van Etten)	Nominated	
2023	Libera Awards	Best American Roots Record	Big Time	Won	
2023	Libera Awards	Best Sync Usage	"Go Home"	Nominated	
