= BM (album) =

Studio album by Barbara Morgenstern
- Released: 2008
- Recorded: Berlin
- Genre: Pop
- Length: 47:25
- Label: Monika Enterprise
- Producer: Barbara Morgenstern

Barbara Morgenstern chronology
The Grass Is Always Greener (2006)	BM (2008)

Professional ratings
Review scores
Source	Rating
Groove	(not rated)
Pitchfork	(7.8/10)
PopMatters	(6/10)
XLR8R	(7/10)

BM is the fifth studio album by Berlin-based musician Barbara Morgenstern. "Driving My Car" is sung in German, English and Polish, while it is the first Barbara Morgenstern album to include full English translation of all her lyrics in the sleeve notes. The album also features a collaboration with former Soft Machine drummer Robert Wyatt. One EP, Come To Berlin Mixes, was taken from the album - the song's lyrics are critical of city planning politics in Berlin.

== Track listing ==
All tracks are written by Barbara Morgenstern (except "Camouflage" with Robert Wyatt).

No.	Title	Length
1.	"Driving My Car"	5:13
2.	"Come To Berlin"	4:14
3.	"Reich & Berühmt"	4:50
4.	"Deine Geschichte"	4:40
5.	"Für Luise"	3:24
6.	"Camouflage"	3:11
7.	"Hochhaus"	2:55
8.	"My Velocity"	1:09
9.	"Morbus Basedow"	3:55
10.	"Monokultur"	3:58
11.	"Jakarta"	3:18
12.	"Meine Aufgabe"	2:16
13.	"Hustefuchs"	3:54
Total length:		47:25

== Personnel ==
- Barbara Morgenstern - piano, vocals, electronics
- Julia Kent - Cello
- Chor Der Kulturen Der Welt - Choir
- Arne Ghosh - Drums
- Sven Janetzko - Guitar
- Robert Wyatt - Vocals (track 6)
