= Nichts Muss =

Studio album by Barbara Morgenstern
- Released: 2004
- Genre: Electronic
- Label: Monika Enterprise

Barbara Morgenstern chronology
Fjorden (2000)	Nichts Muss (2004)	Tesri (2005)

Nichts Muss is an album by the German musician Barbara Morgenstern.

== Track listing ==
1. "Aus Heiterem Himmel" (Out of the blue) – 4:25
2. "Nichts und Niemand" (Nothing and nobody) – 3:57
3. "Ohne Abstand" (Without distance) – 3:54
4. "Nichts Muss" (Nothing has to be) – 8:06
5. "Merci (Dass Es Dich Gibt)" (Merci (That You Are)) – 4:29
6. "Kleiner Ausschnitt" (Small clip) – 3:21
7. "Move" – 3:05
8. "We're All Gonna Fucking Die" – 3:33
9. "Is" – 3:05
10. "Gute Nacht" (Good night) – 3:44
11. "Reset" – 5:44
