= Lady Sleep =

Studio album by Maximilian Hecker
- Released: February 1, 2005
- Genre: Pop rock
- Length: 52:15
- Label: Kitty-Yo

Maximilian Hecker chronology
Rose (2003)	Lady Sleep (2005)	I'll Be A Virgin, I'll Be A Mountain (2006)

Professional ratings
Review scores
Source	Rating
AllMusic	4/5 stars

Lady Sleep is the third studio album by German musician Maximilian Hecker. It was released in 2005 by Kitty-Yo.

== Track listing ==
1. Birch
2. Anaesthesia
3. Summer Days In Bloom
4. Daze Of Nothing
5. Everything Inside Me Is Ill
6. Full Of Voices
7. Help Me
8. Snow
9. Dying
10. Yeah, Eventually She Goes
11. Lady Sleep
