= Mania D =

German band

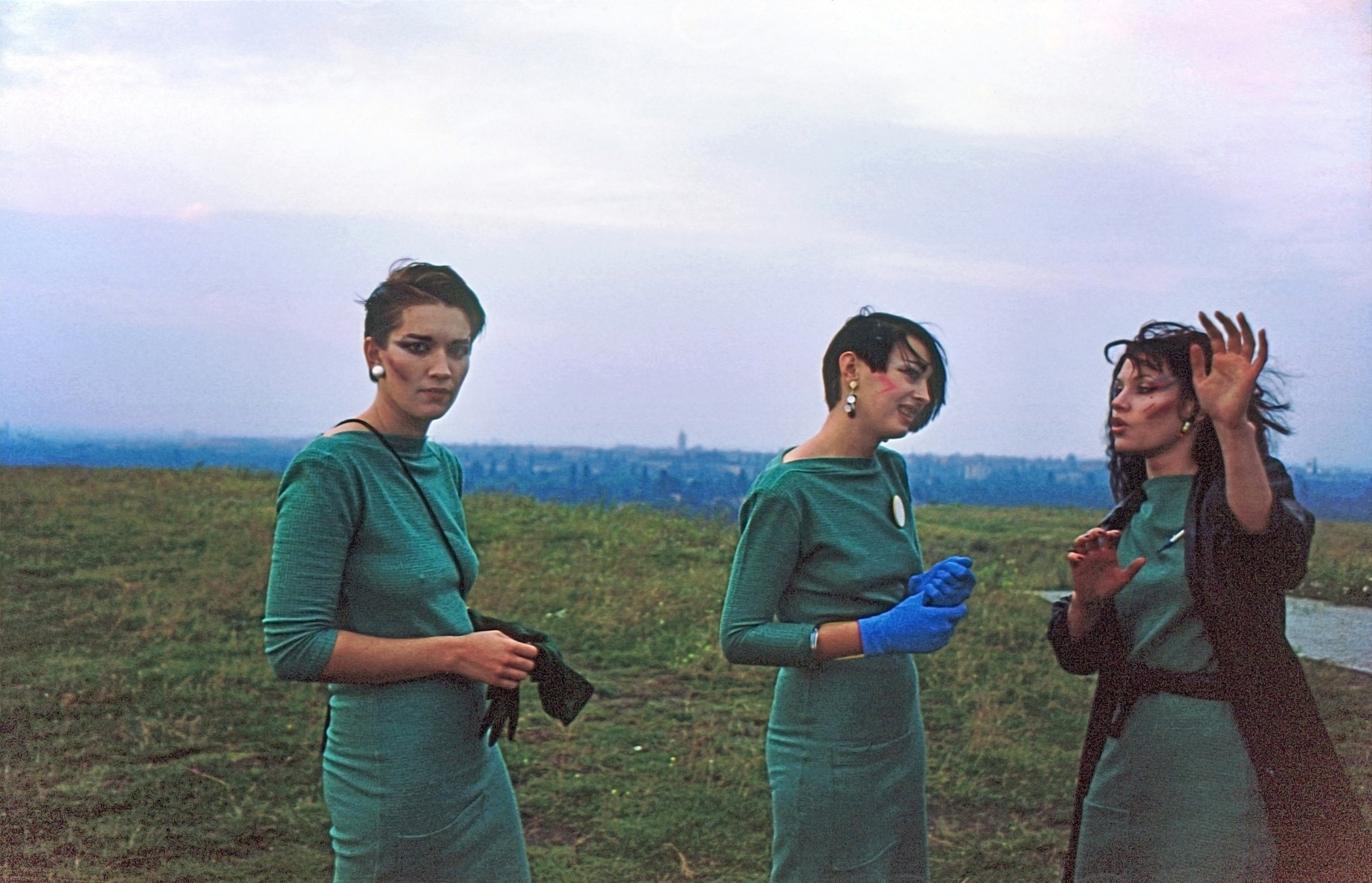
Mania D in 1979

Mania D was a German Neue Deutsche Welle underground band at the end of the seventies to the beginning of the eighties in West Berlin. They had been part of the Geniale Dilettanten (Ingenious Dilettantes) movement. Members were the predecessors of the all-girls band Malaria!, of Liaisons Dangereuses, Einstürzende Neubauten, Die Krupps. Their music unified elements of free jazz with those of new wave by a distinctive saxophone sound.

== History ==
Karin Luner had studied in the class of Professor Hoedecke at the Berlin Academy of Arts along with Salomé (artist) and Middendorf among others. In 1977 she left for a foreign course of study to New York, New York where she shot "Bored", a super 8 movie which eventually was shown in the Berliner SO 36 by Martin Kippenberger. While in New York she took drumming lessons with Fred Maher, the drummer for Lou Reed. On a 1978 visit to her hometown, Duesseldorf, Germany, she met with Eva Gossling in Carmen Knoebels underground club, Ratinger Hof. It was here that she suggested establishing an all-girls band as soon as she returned to Berlin. Eva and Karen, who was studying in Berlin, met Beate Bartel, a bassist and sound engineer, at the Wittenbergplatz subway station. They were joined at their first meeting by tenor saxophonist Bettina Köster and Gudrun Gut, the owner of a mini Moog synthesizer. During the summer of 1979 Mania D rehearsed daily in their Martin Luther Street studio. Beate Bartel named the band, whereas Karin Luner had the idea to shoot a super 8 movie to be shown at all concerts. Karin Luner created the styling for the super-8 movie, Fashion Interlection. The outfit for the video was designed by Eisengrau, Claudia Skoda and Karin Luner. Martin Kippenberger, Volker Anding and Oswald Wiener promoted the young band with organizing concerts, and diner for free at exil, a restaurant owned by Oswald Wiener. Their first concert outside of Berlin was in Sappened in September of '79 in the Wuppertal Nordstadt Kollektiv Galerie.

== Recognition ==
Their recognition led to an invitation to perform in New York. On 24 October 1979, Mania D played on Broome Street at Arleen Schloss' performance loft, A's. The New York audience responded enthusiastically. Mania D performed at the end of November at Tier 3, without Eva Gossling, who was then living with SAMO, alias Jean-Michel Basquiat at A's. Both experimented with music, sound and tapes. Karin Luner stayed in New York. Eva Gossling was invited by Alexander von Borsig alias Alexander Hacke and Richard Hirsch to play in the Berlin band, Blasse. In December 1979 Mania D performed with a smaller crew. In 1981 they founded the band, Malaria!, which unified elements of free jazz with those of experimental music with a distinctive saxophone sound. Bettina Köster's especially striking singing voice characterized the band and replicated the music of Berlin in the Twenties. Gudrun Gut and Bettina Köster along with Eisengrau developed an independent fashion label and a concept store. Under this name they created their unconventional stage outfits. The legendary fog-concert occurred on 18 January 1980 at the unheated SO36 club where it was so cold that patrons could see their breath. A never-before viewed video of the event was discovered in 2010 in the archives of the video artist and filmmaker, Werner Schmiedel. Mania D was not part of the commercial oriented new - German wave, which started in early 1981 after the growing success of bands like D.A.F. and Fehlfarben.

== Members ==
- Karin Luner – drums (1979)
- Beate Bartel – bass (1979–1981)
- Eva Gossling – alt-saxophone, voice (1979)
- Gudrun Gut – synthesizer (1979–1981)
- Bettina Köster – tenor-saxophone, voice (1979–1981)

== Gallery ==
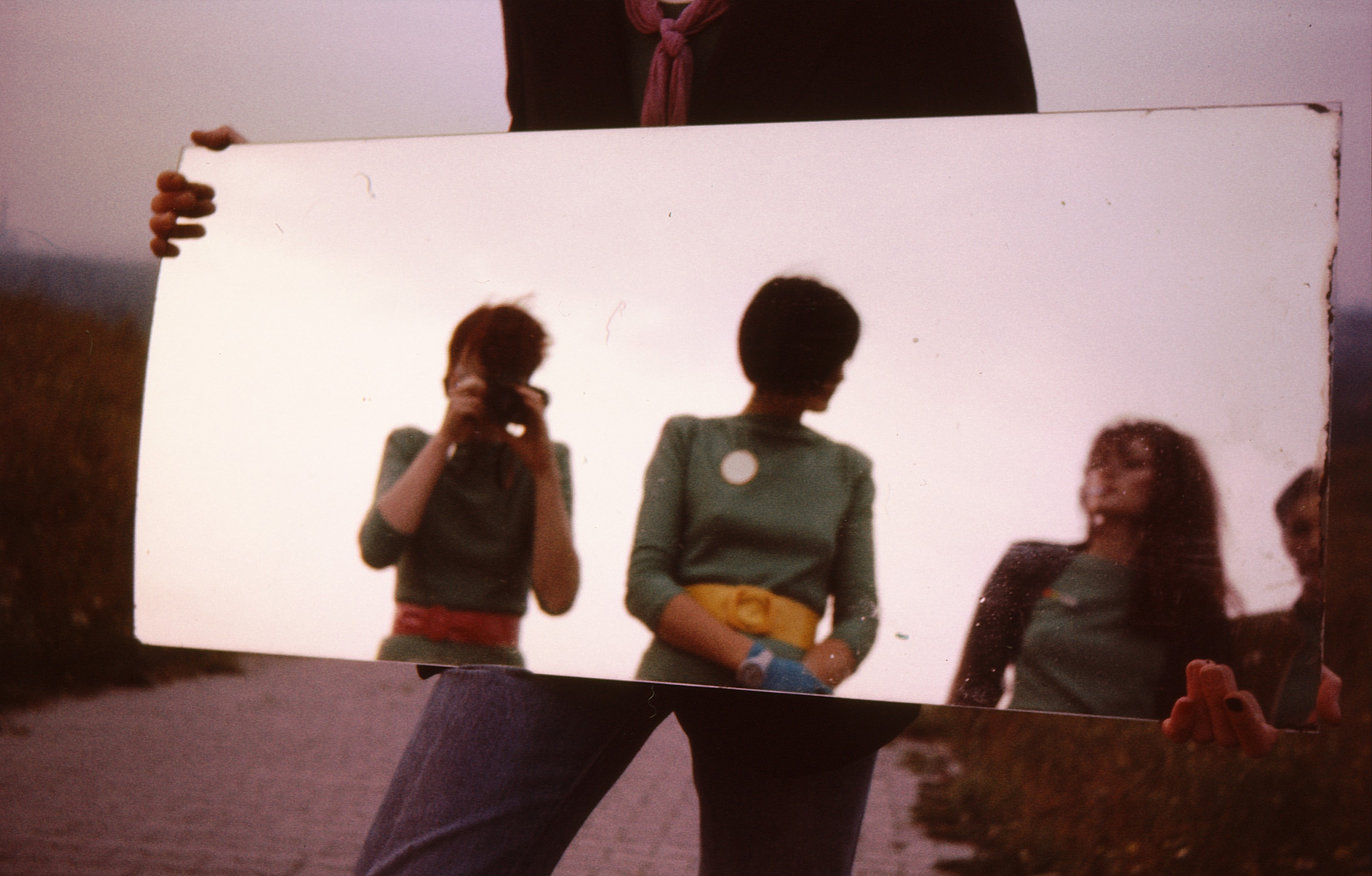
Film location Teufelberg Berlin Mania D Berlin 1979

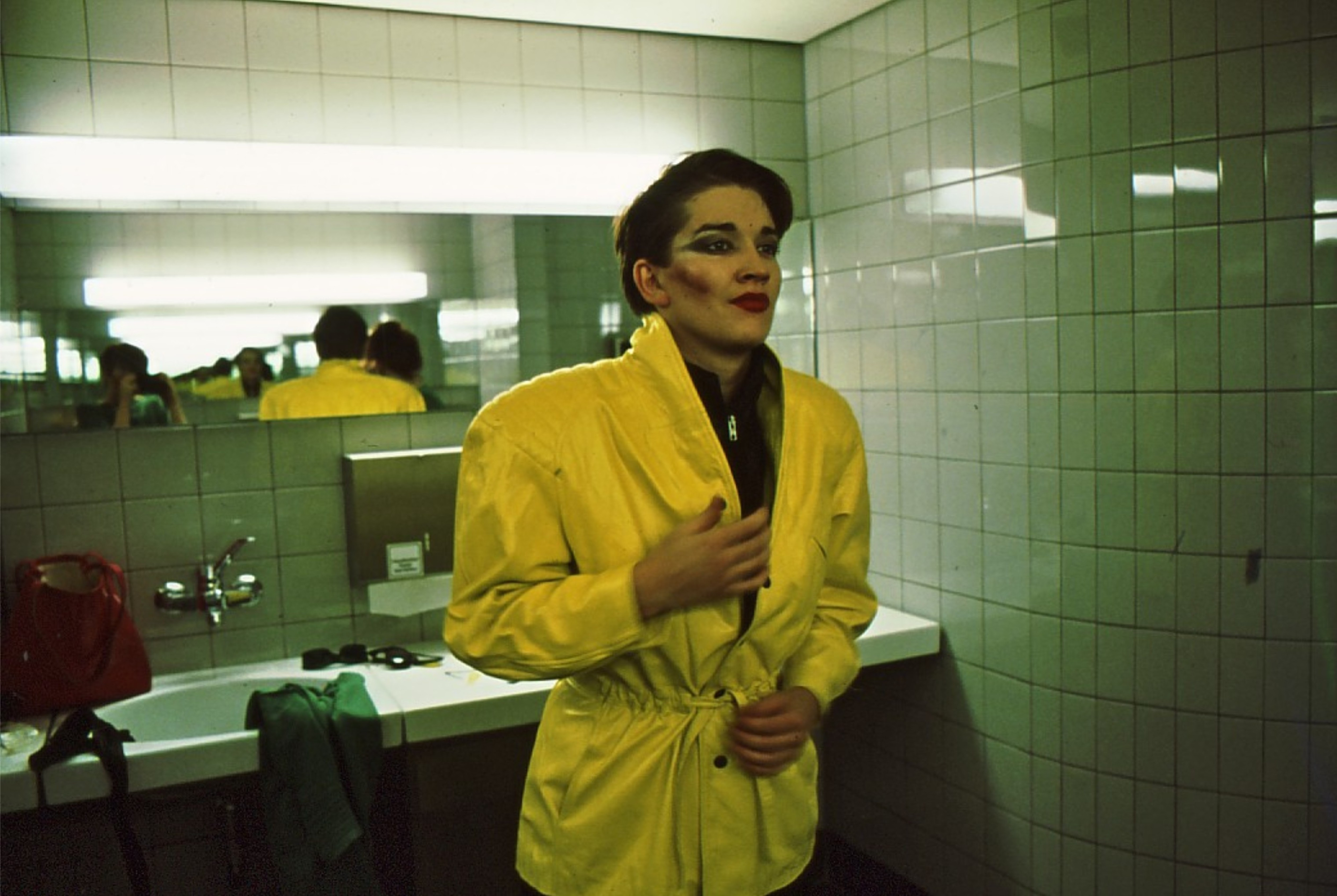
Mania D ICC Berlin 1979 Bettina Köster

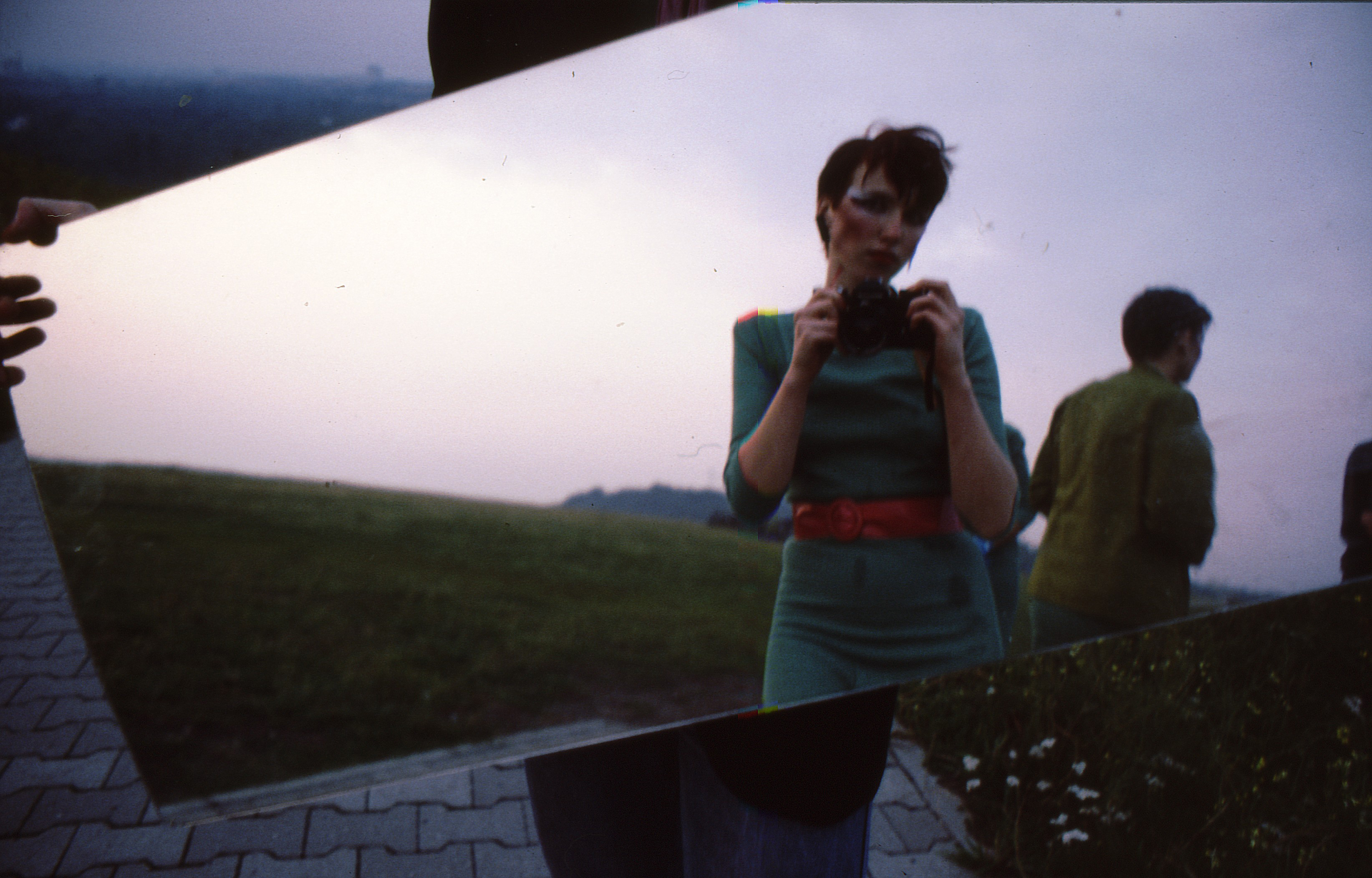
Doubel sky Berlin Mania D Bettina Köster, Eva Gossling

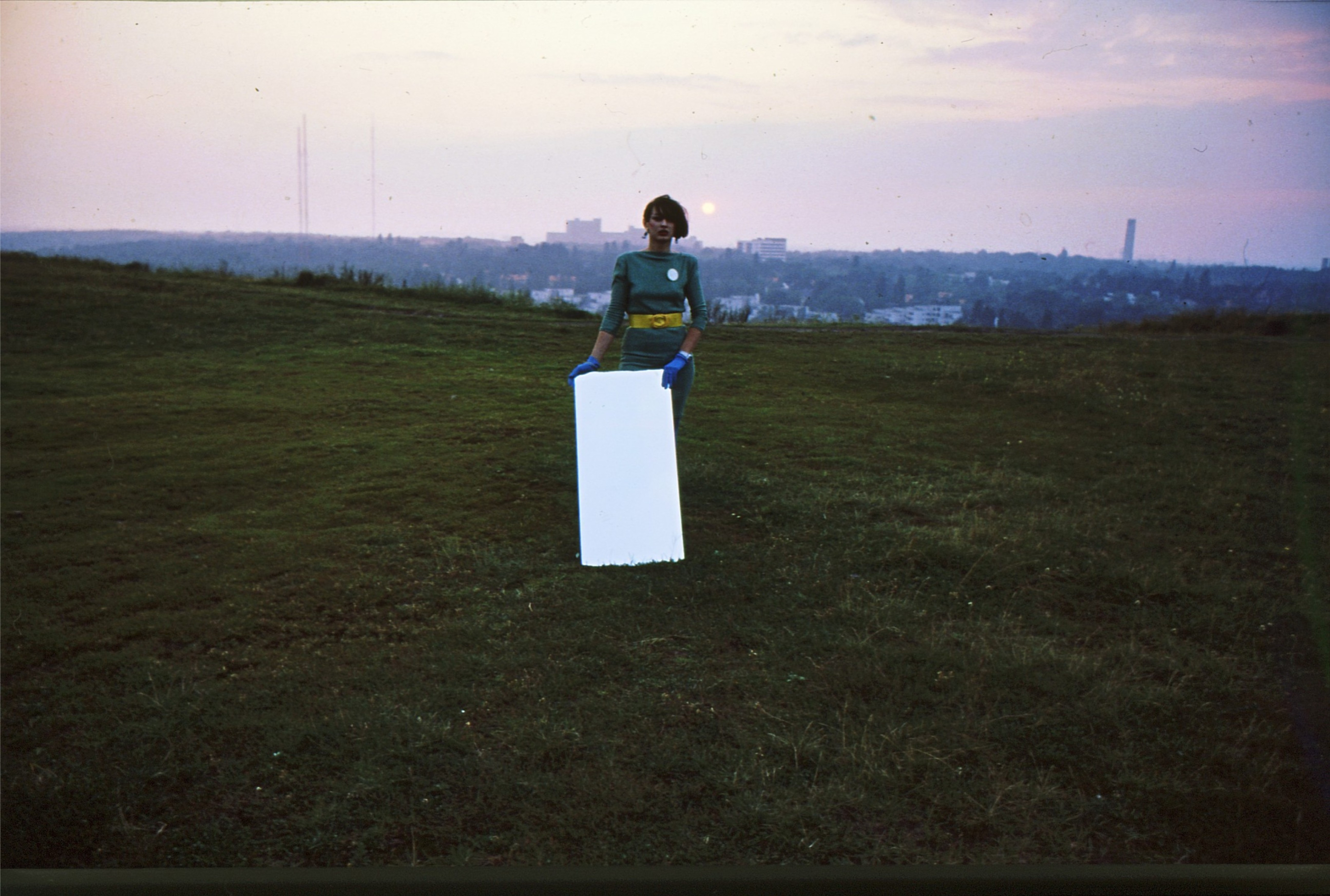
Double sky II Mania D Teufelsberg 1979 Gudrun Gut

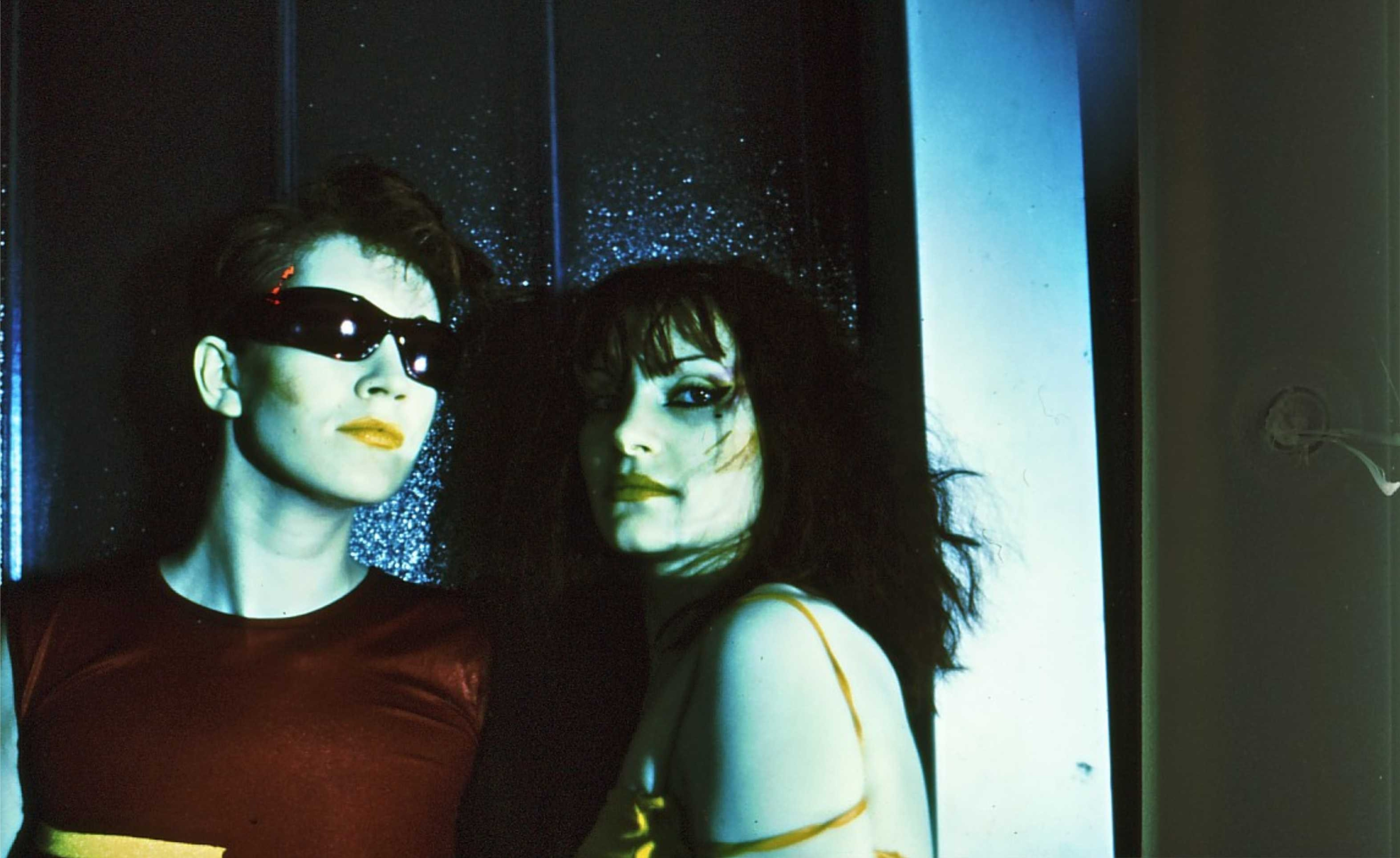
False color photography Mania D Sept 1979

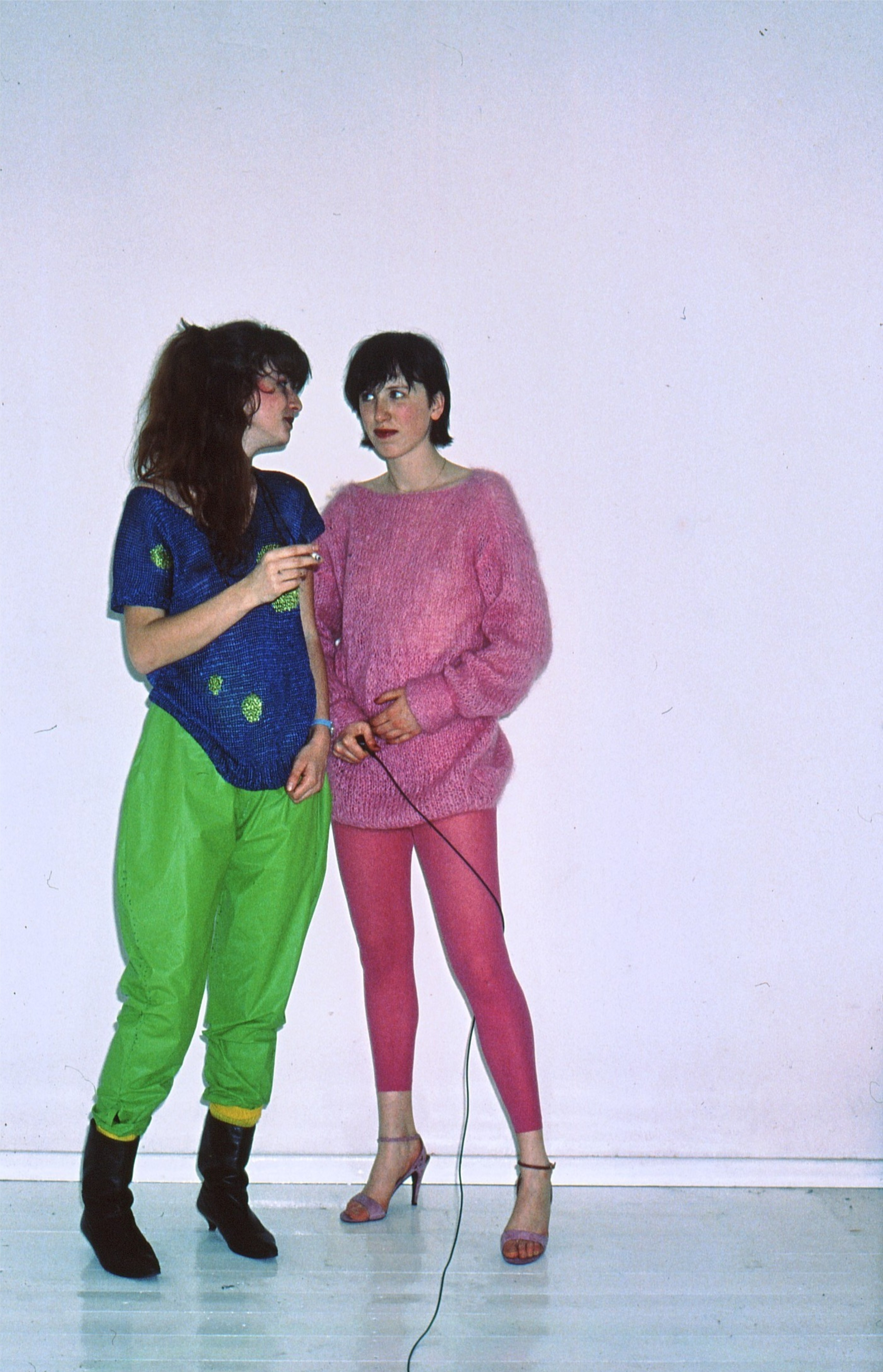
Eisengrau Beate Bartel Eva Gossling

== Discography ==
- Track 4 (1980; Monogam)
- Live in Düsseldorf & SO36 (1980; Eisengrau)
- Jürgen Teipel, Frank Fenstermacher: Verschwende Deine Jugend. Punk und New Wave in Deutschland, Track 22, 2002, Universal Musik, Doppel-CD.

== Literature ==
- Alfred Hilsberg Girls, Girls, Girls (Interview), In: Sounds 11/79 S. 46, Hamburg 1979
- Woman in Rock, In: Sounds 06/81, S. 26/27 Hamburg 1981
- Aber in die Hitparade möchte ich trotzdem (Interview), In: Rock Session 5, Hamburg 1981, ISBN 3-499-17413-8, S. 40–48
- Jürgen Teipel: Verschwende Deine Jugend. Ein Doku-Roman über den deutschen Punk und New Wave. Suhrkamp, Frankfurt/Main 2001, ISBN 3-518-39771-0.
- A's, In: "Bowery Artist Tribute" NEW MUSEUM, Editor Ethan Swan, New York 2010
- Das ist kein Koffer Frankfurter Allgemeine Sonntagszeitung, 27. März 2011, NR.12, FEUILETTON 31
