= Heinz Hoppe =

German opera singer

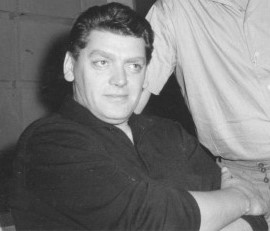
- Hoppe in 1963
- Born: 26 January 1924; Saerbeck, Germany
- Died: 7 April 1993 (aged 69); Mannheim, Germany
- Occupation: Operatic tenor
- Organizations: Theater Münster; Theater Bremen; Hamburg State Opera

Heinz Hoppe (26 January 1924 – 7 April 1993) was a German lyric tenor in opera, lied and operetta, who performed internationally. A long-time member of the Hamburg State Opera, he appeared in world premieres. A regular guest also on radio and television, he was one of the most popular tenors of his time.

== Early life and education ==
Born in Saerbeck, Westphalia, Hoppe grew up in rural Middendorf in the Münsterland. During the Second World War he fought on the Eastern Front and did not return from Soviet captivity to his home country until 1948. He studied voice at the Detmold Conservatory on a scholarship, where Gerd Husler converted him from baritone to tenor.

== Career ==
Hoppe made his stage debut in 1953 in the title role of Handel's Xerxes at the Theater Münster. From 1955, he was a member of the Theater Bremen. From 1956 to 1970, he was First Lyrical Tenor at the Hamburg State Opera. He took part in world premieres, in 1960 of Henze's Der Prinz von Homburg, and in 1964 of Ernst Krenek's Der goldene Bock. In 1961, he was Lysander in the German premiere of Benjamin Britten's A Midsummer Night's Dream.

Hoppe gave regular guest performances in the Frankfurt Opera and the Bavarian State Opera in Munich. He sang in Paris, in New York, at La Scala in Milan, in Madrid and in Lisbon, among others. He also appeared in operetta and lieder recitals, especially with pianist Sebastian Peschko.

Hoppe participated in numerous opera and operetta recordings as well as over 200 radio recordings. His operetta recordings were mainly made at the NDR in Hamburg and Hanover; later Hoppe also worked with the conductor Franz Marszalek, who coupled him with the soprano Ingeborg Hallstein for Polydor Records. He appeared as a regular guest on Heinz Schenk's television show Zum Blauen Bock.

Hoppe was awarded the title Kammersänger in Hamburg. He was a professor of voice at the Musikhochschule Heidelberg-Mannheim from 1977 to 1989.

== Death ==
On 7 April 1993, he died at age 69 in a clinic in Mannheim following surgery.
