= Infinite Love (disambiguation) =

"Infinite Love" is a song by A. R. Rahman.

Infinite Love may also refer to:

- Infinite Love, a 2010 album by Dustin Wong
- Infinite Love, a 1988 song by Meiko Nakahara

== See also ==
- Infinite Love Songs, an album by German musician Maximilian Hecker
