= Rose (Maximilian Hecker album) =

Studio album by Maximilian Hecker
- Released: April 22, 2003
- Genre: Pop rock
- Length: 56:01
- Label: Kitty-Yo

Maximilian Hecker chronology
Infinite Love Songs (2001)	Rose (2003)	Lady Sleep (2005)

Professional ratings
Review scores
Source	Rating
AllMusic	3.5/5 stars

Rose is the second studio album by German musician Maximilian Hecker, released in 2003 on Kitty-Yo.

== Track listing ==
1. Kate Moss
2. I am Falling Now
3. That's What You Do
4. Fool
5. My Story
6. Daylight
7. My Love for You is Insane
8. Powderblue
9. Never-Ending Days
10. My Friends
11. Rose
