= Robert Lippok =

German musician (born 1966)

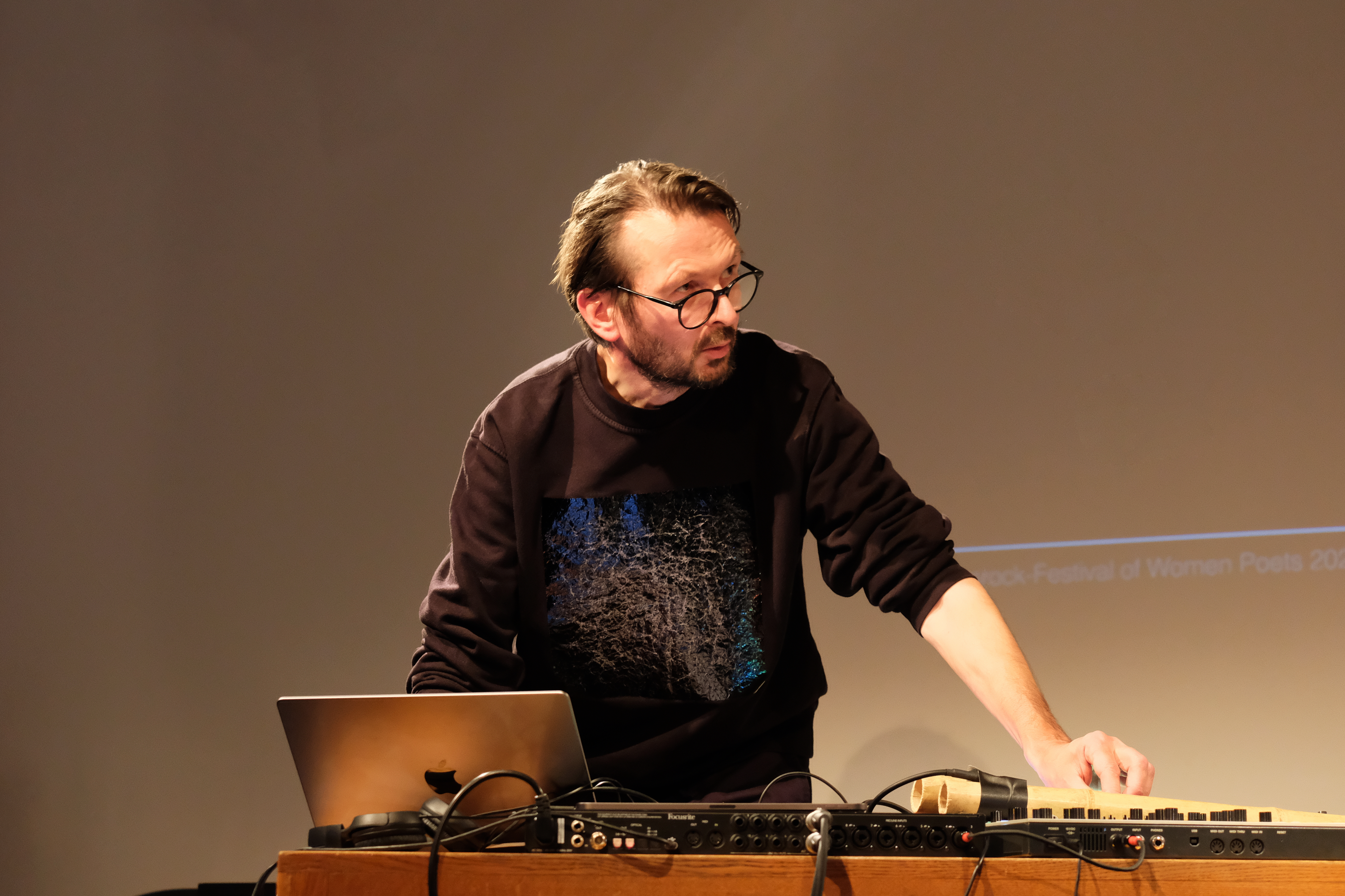
- Lippok in 2022
- Born: 1966 (age 59–60); East Berlin
- Known for: Music, visual art, stage and costume design
- Website: www.robertlippok.de

Robert Lippok (born 1966 in East Berlin) is a German musician, composer, visual artist, and stage and costume designer. He is co-founder of the bands Ornament und Verbrechen (together with Ronald Lippok) and To Rococo Rot (with Ronald Lippok and Stefan Schneider).

== Youth and education ==
Lippok grew up in a Catholic family living at Zionskirchplatz in Berlin-Mitte. Lippok's parents were very interested in art. Through an uncle, he came into contact with the music of Pink Floyd and Led Zeppelin, and later Lippok regularly listened to John Peel's radio show on BFBS. Together with a school friend, he began to make music, using a used Casio VL-1 donated by the friend's father. Lippok learned the profession of theatre shoemaker at the German State Opera in Berlin. He then studied stage design at Weissensee Art Academy. Already in GDR times, Lippok exhibited at the Berlin gallery "Wohnmaschine."

== Works ==
=== Ornament und Verbrechen ===
In 1982, Lippok and his brother Ronald founded the band Ornament & Verbrechen in East Berlin, which they named after a work by architect Adolf Loos. They worked with electronic instruments, which were hard to come by in the GDR and often had to be borrowed or rebuilt from existing material. For example, the brothers manipulated a Vermona rhythm machine or borrowed a Korg MS-20 analogue synthesizer. As percussion instruments they used, among other things, a drawer covered with fur, a plastic canister filled with Lego bricks, and a moped exhaust was converted into a saxophone. The desire to experiment was not only due to a lack of materials, but, according to Lippok, represented a decision against the prevailing rock aesthetic. As inspiration for the band, Lippok cited music by Einstürzende Neubauten, Die Tödliche Doris, Deutsch-Amerikanische Freundschaft, Throbbing Gristle, and Cabaret Voltaire. To listen to music they found interesting, the brothers resorted to Sender Freies Berlin and RIAS, among other things. In their Music, they picked up elements of industrial and post-punk and worked with psychedelic elements. The band had no official permission to play in the GDR, but had fun organizing a pirate gig at the Palace of the Republic in 1986, for example. The unofficial recordings of their music and illegal gigs were distributed in small editions as cassettes via the Lippok's cassette label "Assorted Nuts", and sometimes as an accompaniment to self-published magazines. The line-up of the group, which sometimes performed under pseudonyms, changed frequently. Over the years, around 50 musicians played with the brothers. The band never broke up: in 2012, Ornament und Verbrechen played at Neuer Berliner Kunstverein. In 2015, they were featured extensively as part of the touring exhibition "Geniale Dilletanten [sic]" hosted by Goethe-Institut, alongside other style-defining bands of 1980s German subculture. In the following year, the band was responsible for the music for the Brecht-fragment Untergang des Egoisten Johann Fatzer, in a version by Tom Kühnel and Jürgen Kuttner, at Deutsches Theater.

=== To Rococo Rot ===
In 1995, Lippok was engaged as a DJ after a Kreidler concert in Berlin. He got into conversation with the band's bassist Stefan Schneider, and they agreed to make music together. The project was realised when Lippok and his brother organised a joint exhibition at the Berlin gallery "Weißer Elefant". They invited Schneider to collaborate on a picture disc for the exhibition. The brothers chose the palindrome To Rococo Rot as the name for the project. Shortly after, the three released their first LP on Kitty-Yo, further records came out on City Slang and Domino Records. The band's music moved between krautrock, electronica, post-rock, post-techno and dance, with Robert Lippok operating synthesizers and samplers. The band existed until 2014.

=== Musical solo projects and collaborations ===
Since the late 1990s, Lippok has pursued solo projects as a musician and cooperated on a project-by-project basis with other musicians and visual artists. For example, there were solo releases on Olaf Bender's and Carsten Nicolai's label Raster-Noton as well as several recordings with Barbara Morgenstern. In 2006, the Lippok brothers were invited by pianist and composer Ludovico Einaudi to accompany him on a tour. They later recorded an album under the project name Whitetree, released in 2009, combining Einaudi's piano playing with electro, percussion, and krautrock elements. In 2014 he created together with Roberto Paci Dalò the project Ghosts&Phantoms. In 2017, Lippok accompanied Einaudi on another tour. The album was released in 2006.

In 2013, as part of the project "Dance of the Archives", Lippok collaborated with artist Clara Jo on the film installation "24h Dahlem", a commission from Humboldt Lab Dahlem and Deutsche Kinemathek. In the process, he put together a sound installation using acoustic material from the Kinemathek's archive.

During a working fellowship in Stockholm, Robert Lippok's 2018 electro album "Applied Autonomy" was created with the participation of Swedish composer Klara Lewis. Lippok and designer Lucas Gutierrez developed an audio-visual concert accompanying the album. In 2019, Lippok and Gutierrez collaborated again, this time as part of the Berliner Festspiele: They created fulldome video and soundscapes for the program series "The New Infinity – Neue Kunst für Planetarien." Robert Lippok also appears as a composer for sound installations by other visual artists. He created music for exhibitions by Olaf Nicolai, Doug Aitken, for Nina Fischer/Maroan el Sani and for Julian Charrieré, among others.

The "Glacier Music" is a multimedia project by "Goethe Institute" initiated in 2013. It uses sounds and images of the melting glaciers of Central Asia as inspiration. The project promotes the exchange of art and science and draws attention to the man-made precarious state of nature. The artists Robert Lippok (Berlin), Lillevan (Berlin), Anushka Chkheidze (Tbilisi), Eto Gelashvili (Tbilisi), Hayk Karoyi Karapetyan (Yerevan) and the Anchiskhati Ensemble (Tbilisi) composed together in the studio and in the mountains of the Caucasus.

=== Stage and costume designer ===
Lippok has worked with theatre director Sebastian Baumgarten since 1993. In the course of this collaboration, he created the stage and costume designs for Maxim Gorki Theater, Volksbühne, Komische Oper Berlin, and Staatstheater Kassel. In 2019, he designed the set and costumes for Stewart Copeland's production of the opera Electric Saint at Kunstfest Weimar.

=== Music for dance theatre ===
Lippok composed the music for the 2017 premiere of the Dorky Park dance company's performance "The Pose", directed by Constanza Macras. In 2019, he composed the music for Macras's piece "The Palace," also performed by Dorky Park, this time at the Volksbühne.

=== Visual artist ===
Friedrich Loock ran a gallery named "Galerie Wohnmaschine" in his apartment at the corner of August-/Tucholskystraße. After the fall of the Berlin Wall, it was the first private gallery in what would later become the "gallery district" of Berlin-Mitte. Here, in January 1989, shortly before the fall of the Wall, Lippok exhibited "Schimmelmaschinen und Schimmel". At the opening, guests were invited to bring mouldy objects, which were exhibited together with kinetic machines that merely produced sounds. The mould cultures multiplied over the following two weeks. However, the gallery owner had to take care of their removal on his own: Lippok's exit permit had been unexpectedly granted, and he had to leave the GDR immediately. In the years that followed the fall of the Berlin Wall, Wohnmaschine (later Galerie Loock) became a renowned exhibition venue for international art. Lippok was represented there with the exhibitions "steady" (2001), "Field recordings" (2003) and "Foggy Boxes". With them, he continued his multimedia work (photography, collage, installation, and sound), which often refers to architectural and intellectual spaces.

Another multimedia work was the sound installation "Knitting Smoke", shown in 2011 in the group exhibition "Halleluhwah! Hommage à Can" at Künstlerhaus Bethanien. Lippok had the sound frequencies of the Can song "Smoke (E.F.S. No. 59)" translated for a knitting machine, which used them to create a patterned sweater. The garment was displayed, and the modulated noise of the knitting machine could be heard from two loudspeakers in the exhibition. In 2012, he exhibited his installation "By the Niger River" at Künstlerhaus Bethanien, in which he artistically processed a trip to Mali: Lippok presented mobile electric lamps, as they are used in Ségou, combined with kneading models and recordings of everyday sounds from the villages he had visited. In 2017, Lippok reinterpreted three dances from Henry Purcell's semi-opera The Fairy-Queen with his sound installation "What Is Dance?" at "Meinblau Projektraum" in Berlin. The work consisted of a series of objects played by sensor technology and electric motors, and a loudspeaker system. Lippok was inspired by the oeuvre of the American sound artist Joe Jones. In the same year "What is dance?" was shown as part of the Eufònic Festival taking place at the Catalan Templar fortress Castell de Miravet, and at Hamburger Bahnhof in Berlin. In 2019, as part of the CTM Festival, Lippok contributed a composition to the "Raster.Labor", which was initiated by the Raster label. During the festival, he also DJed at the Halle at Berghain, which had been converted into an ice rink.

=== Other activities ===
In 2012, Lippok was a fellow of Institut für Raumexperimente, an experimental education and research project affiliated with the Berlin University of the Arts, founded by Olafur Eliasson and others. He is a member of the registered association that emerged from the institute. As of 2020, Lippok teaches as a lecturer at the Berlin branch of the Tisch School of the Arts / New York University and is a member of the board of trustees of the "Spatial Sound Institute" in Budapest.[52]

== Discography ==
- 1999: Theatermusik (with Bo Kondren, Ronald Lippok, Bernd Jestram / Crosstalk)
- 2001: Open Close Open (Raster-Noton)
- 2002: Seasons (mit Barbara Morgenstern / Domino)
- 2004: Falling Into Komëit (Monika Enterprise)
- 2005: Tesri (with Barbara Morgenstern / Monika Enterprise)
- 2005: Timeline (with Jesse Osborne-Lanthier / Geographic North)
- 2006: Robot (Western Vinyl)
- 2009: Whitetree – Cloudland (with Ludovico Einaudi and Ronald Lippok)
- 2011: Redsuperstructure (Raster-Noton)
- 2011: B.I.L.L. – Spielwiese Zwei (with Jaki Liebezeit, Jochen Irmler and Clive Bell / Klangbad)
- 2018: Applied Autonomy (Raster)
