= Lippok =

Lippok is a German surname. Notable people with the surname include:

- Robert Lippok (born 1966), German musician, composer, visual artist, and stage and costume designer
- Silke Lippok (born 1994), German swimmer
