= Natalie Beridze =

Georgian composer and songwriter (born 1979)

Natalie Beridze ნატალია ბერიძე
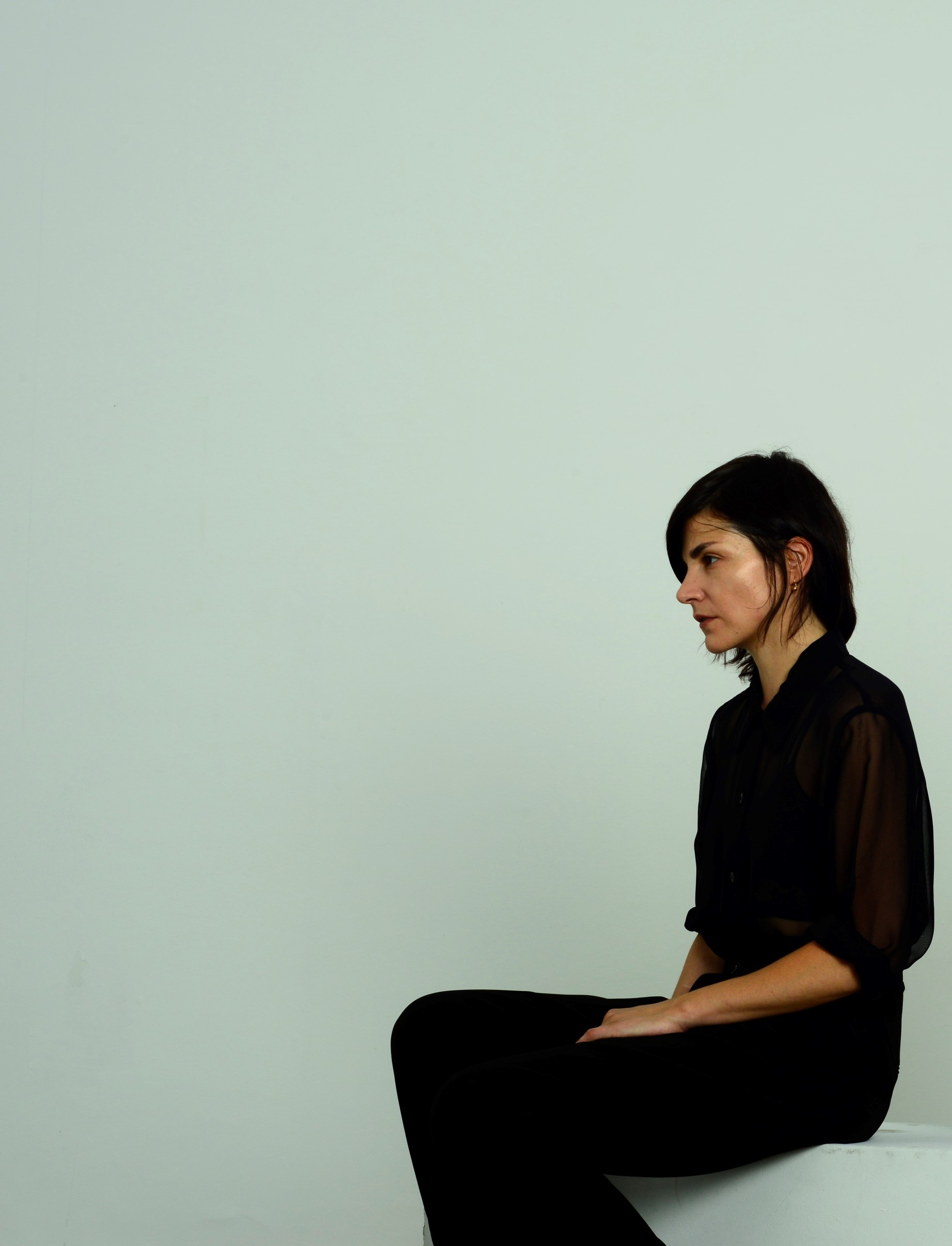

Background information
- Also known as: TBA
- Born: 28 March 1979 (age 46); Tbilisi, Georgian SSR, Soviet Union
- Genres: Classical
- Occupations: Composer; Songwriter; Record producer
- Instrument: Singing
- Years active: 2002–present
- Labels: Monika Enterprise; Room40

Natalie "Tusia" Beridze (Note: Georgian: ნატალია ბერიძე, romanized: Nat’alia Beridze) (born 28 March 1979, known by her stage name TBA and the diminutive Tusia) is a Georgian music composer, songwriter, and record producer, best known for her albums Georgia Is Like Spiritual Tokyo (2003), What About Things Like Bullets (2007), and Forget’fulness (2011). She was born in Tbilisi and is considered a pioneering female electronic musician from Georgia.

In 2002, she came second place for the MuVi Award at the 48th Oberhausen International Short Film Festival for her work on the music video Game (2001) by Nika Machaidze. From 2002 to 2008, she was based in Cologne, Germany, after being signed to Thomas Brinkmann's label.

She has also recorded under the labels Monika Enterprise and Room40, and collaborated with artists such as Thomas Brinkmann, Antye Greie, Gudrun Gut, Marcus Schmickler, and Ryuichi Sakamoto. Since 2013, she has presented the live music show Live @ Twilight on Artarea TV in Georgia.
