= The Grass Is Always Greener =

The Grass is Always Greener

Studio album by Barbara Morgenstern
- Released: 2006
- Genre: Electronica
- Label: Monika Enterprise

Barbara Morgenstern chronology
Tesri	The Grass is Always Greener (2006)	BM (2008)

Professional ratings
Review scores
Source	Rating
Allmusic	4/5 stars
Pitchfork Media	(8.0/10)
Tiny Mix Tapes	4/5 stars

The Grass is Always Greener is a 2006 album by Barbara Morgenstern.

== Track listing ==
1. "The Grass Is Always Greener" – 4:43
2. "The Operator" – 4:23
3. "Polar" – 3:24
4. "Das Schöne Einheitsbild" – 3:13
5. "Unser Mann Aus Hollywood" – 2:45
6. "Juist" – 3:53
7. "Alles Was Lebt Bewegt Sich" – 3:40
8. "Ein Paar Sekunden" – 3:34
9. "Die Japanische Schranke" – 5:06
10. "Quality Time" – 4:09
11. "Mailand" – 2:35
12. "Initials B.M." – 4:09
