= Hotel Morgen =

Studio album by To Rococo Rot
- Released: 18 May 2004
- Genre: Electronic
- Length: 43:03
- Label: Domino Recording Company

To Rococo Rot chronology
| Kölner Brett (2001) | Hotel Morgen (2004) | Taken From Vinyl (2006) |

Professional ratings
Aggregate scores
| Source | Rating |
|---|---|
| Metacritic | 72/100 |
Review scores
| Source | Rating |
| AllMusic | 3.5/5 stars |

Hotel Morgen is a studio album by German band To Rococo Rot. It was released in May 2004 under Domino Recording Company.

== Track list ==
| No. | Title | Length |
|---|---|---|
| 1. | "Dahlem" | 4:17 |
| 2. | "Cosimo" | 3:22 |
| 3. | "Tal" | 2:56 |
| 4. | "Feld" | 3:38 |
| 5. | "Portrait Song" | 2:19 |
| 6. | "Sol" | 3:59 |
| 7. | "Plong" | 0:18 |
| 8. | "Miss You" | 4:29 |
| 9. | "Basic" | 3:58 |
| 10. | "Venus" | 1:57 |
| 11. | "Non Song" | 4:28 |
| 12. | "Ovo" | 2:41 |
| 13. | "Bologna" | 3:04 |
| 14. | "Opak" | 1:37 |
