= Bettina Köster =

German musician, singer and composer (1959–2026)

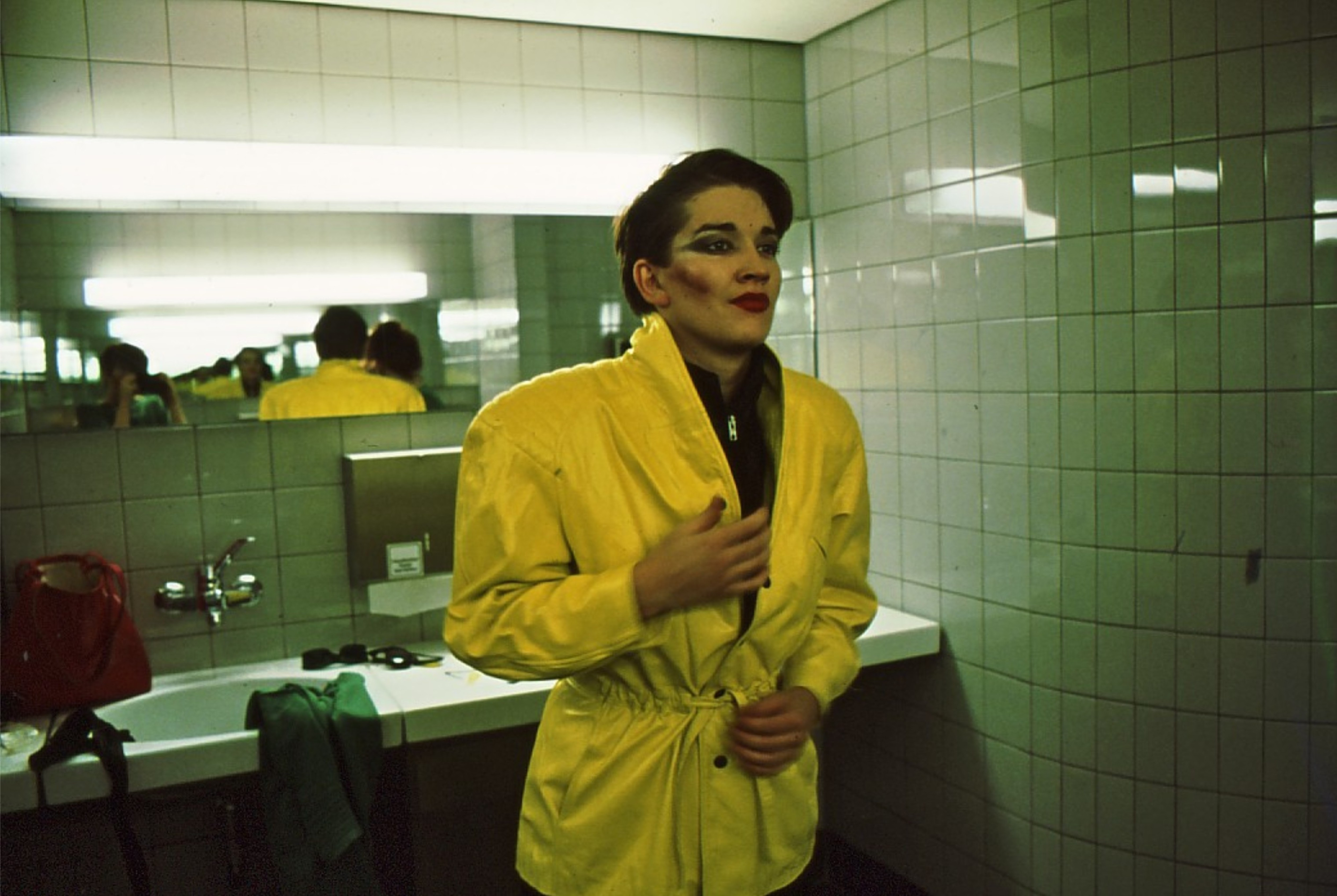
- Köster in 1979

Background information
- Born: 15 June 1959; Herford, North Rhine-Westphalia, West Germany
- Died: 16 March 2026 (aged 66) Capaccio Paestum, Italy
- Genres: Avant-garde; dark ambient
- Occupations: Musician; singer; songwriter; record producer
- Instruments: Vocals; saxophone; guitar
- Years active: 1979–2026
- Labels: Crépuscule; Psycho; Rebel; Jungle
- Formerly of: Mania D

Bettina Köster (15 June 1959 – 16 March 2026) was a German musician, saxophonist, composer, singer, songwriter and record producer.

== Life and career ==
=== Mania D: 1979–1981 ===
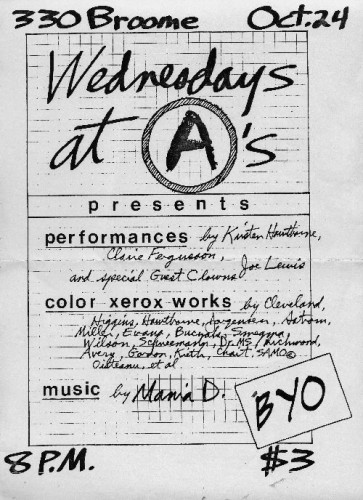
Mania D at A's Broome Street NYC, 1979

In the fall of 1978, Köster, a student of the Berlin art school Hochschule der Künste, began playing saxophone for the Berlin underground band DIN A Testbild. In May 1979, Köster started with Karin Luner, Beate Bartel, Eva Gossling and Gudrun Gut an all-girls-band project Mania D. In fall 1979, Mania D performed in New York at Arleen Schloss A's, and in the Club Tier 3.

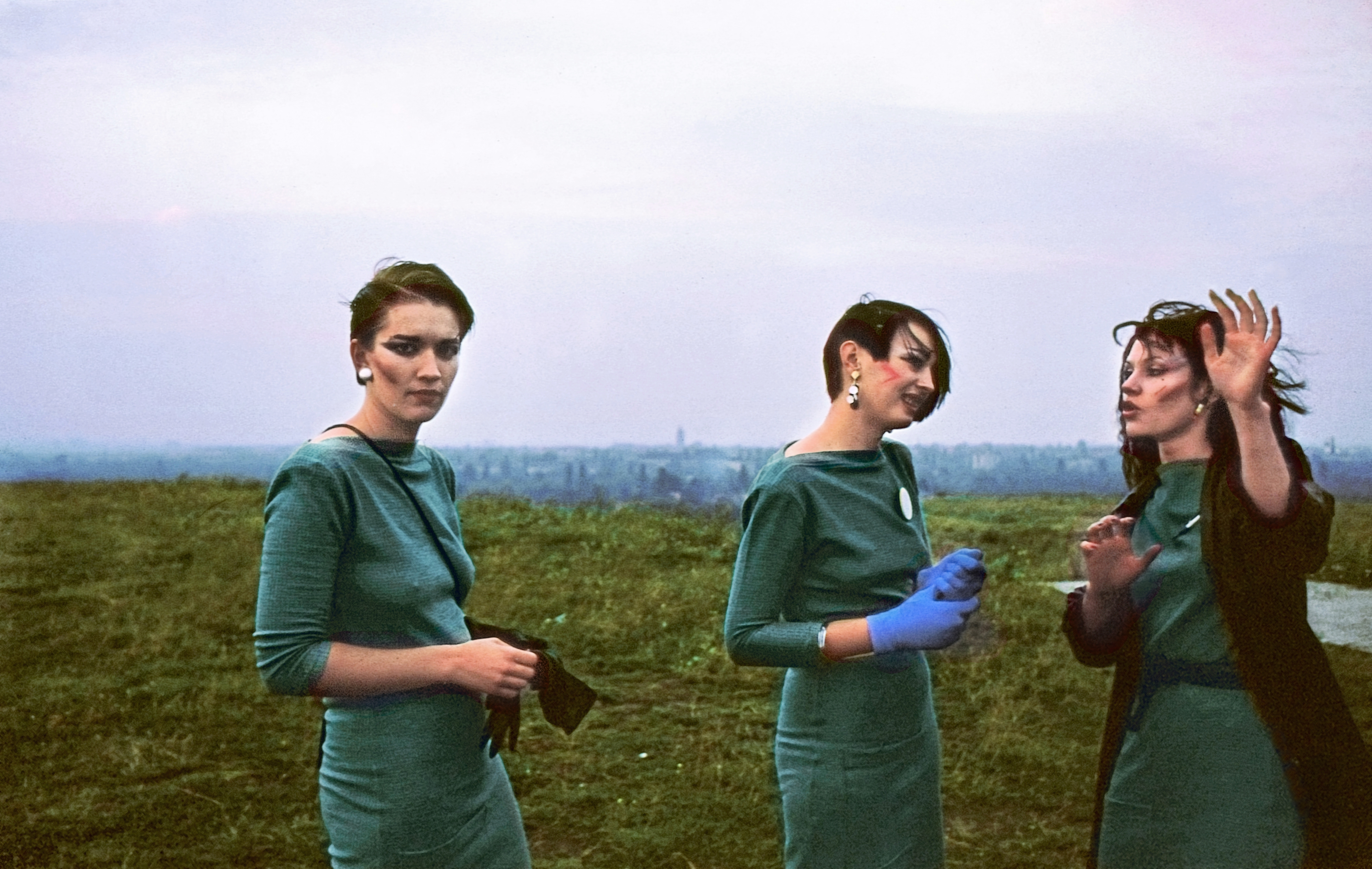
Mania D Sept 1979, left Bettina Köster

In the same year, she opened with Gudrun Gut the store Eisengrau (metalgrey), showing underground fashion, Super 8-movies and artwork as part of the concept. Köster's Eisengrau-concept emerged to a scene hot-spot for Tabea Blumenschein, Alexander von Borsig, Blixa Bargeld and others. In 1980, Eisengrau began publishing small editions of tapes with the musical works of underground bands, classifying thereby Eisengrau to a medium for music.

Bettina Köster belonged to a group of Berlin artists named genius dilettantes, who, starting in 1980, performed in quick changing band-formations such as Liebesgier, Nachdenkliche Wehrpflichtige and Einstürzende Neubauten among others. Wolfgang Müller from Die Tödliche Doris invented the characterizing term of the "genius dilettantes" in his book about the Berlin scene published at the Merve-Verlag. The British radio host John Peel referred to Köster, Gut and Beate Bartel who meanwhile had separated, during a show on 25. July 1981, as his "Queens of Noise". Mania D's production track 4 was chosen by Peel in his Radio-Show to as the single of the year.

=== Malaria!: 1981–1984 ===
In the same year, Köster and Gudrun Gut started the Indie band Malaria! Malaria! gained international recognition with their song "Kaltes klares Wasser", they performed at the New Yorker Studio 54 and Mudd Club. Malaria toured with Siouxsie and the Banshees and The Birthday Party among others. As a lyricist Köster influenced succeeding girl Bands, such as Chicks on Speed, who released a cover version of Malaria's 1981 Hit "Kaltes Klares Wasser". In Playboy Magazine January 1985 "The Girls of Rock 'n' Roll", she is model together with Grace Jones, Tina Turner, Pat Benatar and Diana Ross.

=== Solo career: 1984–2009 ===
Köster lived in New York from 1983 to 2001, where she worked as a film author and producer with the director Isabel Hegner. In 1997, Köster composed the music for the film Peppermills, which won 1998 at the Berlinale the Teddy Award in the category Best Short Film. The film was directed by the Swiss Isabel Hegner, later producing a 2003 released documentary "Burma: Anatomy of Terror" which was co-produced by Köster. While researching Burma for the film, Köster came across material about the drug princess Olive Yang, laying the foundation for the thriller Mandalay Moon, which she wrote together with Martin Schacht, published 2007 by Rowohlt. In 2005, Köster performed with the musician Jessie Evans in the supporting program of The Vanishing. This led to the music project Autonervous, releasing an album in 2006.

=== Later work ===
From 2009, when "Queen of Noise" was published on Assinela Records, Vienna, Köster performed regularly with the Viennese drummer Ines Perschy in Clubs and on Festivals like Waregem in Belgium, Wave-Gotik-Treffen in Leipzig, Germany.

== Personal life and death ==
Köster lived in southern Italy. She identified as non-binary in an interview with L-Mag in 2021. She died at her home in Capaccio Paestum on 16 March 2026, at the age of 66.

== Discography ==
- 1980: Track 4, ManiaD, Monogam
- 1980: ManiaD Live in Düsseldorf & SO36, Eisengrau
- 1980: White Christmas, Liebesgier, Marat Records (7")
- 1981: Malaria (12"), Marat Records
- 1981: How Do You Like My New Dog? (7"), Les Disques Du Crépuscule
- 1982: Emotion (LP), Moabit Musik
- 1982: New York Passage (12"), Jungle Records
- 1982: White Water (12"), Les Disques Du Crépuscule
- 1982: Die Hausfrauen – New York Berlin, Psycho Records
- 1983: Revisited – Live (Kassette), ROIR
- 1984: Beat The Distance (12"), Rebel Rec.
- 1991: Compiled (CD), Moabit Musik
- 1991: Kaltes Klares Wasser (CDM), Moabit Musik
- 1992: Elation (CDM), Moabit Musik
- 1993: Cheerio (CD), Moabit Musik
- 2001: Compiled 1981–1984 (CD)
- 2001: Versus EP (12"), Superstar Recordings
- 2002: Jürgen Teipel, Frank Fenstermacher: Verschwende Deine Jugend. Punk and New Wave in Deutschland, Track 22, Universal Musik
- 2003: Delirium: Remixed, Remade, Remodelled (CD) MFS
- 2006: Autonervous (CD)
- 2009: Queen of Noise, (CD), Asinella Records
- 2017: Kolonel Silvertop (CD), Pale Music

== Filmography ==
- 1980: Woman in Rock, Regie: Wolfgang Büld ARD, VHS, A Studio K7, Berlin
- 1998: Peppermills – Regie: Isabel Hegner
- 1995: Girls Bite Back – Regie: Wolfgang Büld
- 2005: Verschwende Deine Jugend.doc – Regie: Jürgen Teipel & Sigrid Harder
- 2011: arte tracks Malaria! Reportage von Valérie Paillé

== Bibliography ==
- Marke B, Berliner Labels. Verbrecher Verlag, Berlin 2002, ISBN 3-935843-18-6 (mit Thomas Fehlmann und Daniel Meteo).
- Bettina Köster belongs to the interviewees in Jürgen Teipel's book Verschwende Deine Jugend.
