= Figur 5 =

Studio album by Couch
- Released: 2006
- Genre: Post rock
- Label: Morr Music

Figur 5 is an album by Couch, an instrumental band based in Munich, Germany on the Morr Music label.

AllMusic stated in its review of the album, "Though it isn't as ambitious as Couch's 1999 album Fantasy, Figur 5 is consistently enjoyable and a welcome return."

== Track listing ==
1. "Gegen Alles Bereit"
2. "Zwei Streifen Im Blau"
3. "Alles Sagt Ja"
4. "Blinde Zeichen"
5. "Position: Wieder Eins"
6. "Große Verzögerung"
7. "Manchmal Immer Wieder"
8. "Einhängen und Positiver"
9. "Läßt Nicht Nach"
