= To Rococo Rot =

German electronic music and rock band

- Origin: Berlin, Germany
- Genres: Post-rock; Electronic / IDM; Ambient; Minimalism
- Years active: 1995–2014
- Labels: Kitty-Yo; City Slang; Domino Records
- Members: Robert Lippok; Ronald Lippok; Stefan Schneider

To Rococo Rot were a Berlin-based band who combined electronic and analog elements to create instrumental post-rock music. Pitchfork described the band's sound as "unmistakably digital, yet 100% human." The group was composed of bassist Stefan Schneider and brothers Robert (electronics, guitar) and Ronald Lippok (drums, effects). The band's name is a palindrome, as it can be spelled the same both forwards and backwards.

To Rococo Rot formed in 1995 and were active until 2014, releasing eight major albums and numerous collaborations, remixes, singles and EPs. They were known for their minimalist, musically engaging live show, and gave their final performance on December 17, 2014, via a live-streamed Boiler Room "In Stereo" session.

== History ==
While involved in the Cabaret Voltaire-inspired experimental outfit Ornament and Verbrechen, the Lippok brothers connected with then-Kreidler bassist Stefan Schneider to make a one-off record project intended to accompany a gallery exhibition. The group's eponymous debut, recorded on an ADAT without editing, was released in 1995 in the form of a picture disc, and subsequently issued on CD by Kitty Yo in 1996. During the trio's early years, Schneider continued to play in Kreidler before leaving to focus on To Rococo Rot. Ronald Lippok simultaneously recorded with Tarwater. Robert Lippok has described To Rococo Rot's approach as "a very simple way of organizing music" that focuses on just a few musical elements at a time.

To Rococo Rot rose to prominence with three critically acclaimed albums released by UK independent label City Slang. The band's sound continued to evolve following a move to Domino Records: Hotel Morgen (2004) emphasizes the group's electronic and IDM side, while Speculation (2010) was hailed for "capturing a more live sound and looser atmosphere." The band's last full-length album, Instrument, was released in July 2014, and features Arto Lindsay on three tracks. Commenting on the uncustomary inclusion of vocals, Robert Lippok said: "The melodies Arto sang were surprising... His voice is light and is flying over the music with turns and twists, but also it is brittle and has something almost fragile about it. It's like a delicate bird."

Shortly after releasing Instrument, "a big gap of expectations" surfaced among members, and the band decided to split up. All three members have since gone on to release music through various projects.

In 2022, Bureau B released The John Peel Sessions, which collects the band's three previously unreleased John Peel Sessions, recorded between 1997 and 1999. Then on December 12, 2022, To Rococo Rot reunited for a special one-time appearance at the Lieblingsplatte ("Favorite Records") Festival in Düsseldorf, where the band performed the 1999 album The Amateur View in its entirely.

== Discography ==
=== Studio albums ===
Title	Release date	Notes	Label
To Rococo Rot	January 12, 1996	Eponymous debut	Kitty-Yo
Veiculo	February 20, 1997		City Slang
The Amateur View	April 26, 1999		City Slang
Music is a Hungry Ghost	April 30, 2001	Featuring I-Sound (turntable effects)	City Slang
Hotel Morgen	April 19, 2004		Domino
Taken From Vinyl	November 27, 2006	12 previously vinyl-only tracks (Enhanced CD version features a video for 'Telema')	Staubgold
Speculation	March 8, 2010	Featuring Faust's Hans Joachim Irmler (keyboards) on "Friday"	Domino
Instrument	April 2014	Featuring Arto Lindsay (vocals on three tracks)	City Slang
The John Peel Sessions	November 4, 2022	Collects the band's three previously unreleased John Peel Sessions, recorded 1997–1999	Bureau B

=== Commissioned projects ===
Title	Release date	Notes	Label
Kölner Brett	November 26, 2001	‘Kölner Brett’ is the name of a Cologne building for which To Rococo Rot were asked to supply a "musical translation."	Staubgold
ABC One Two Three	October 21, 2007	Music resulting from a commission related to the 50th anniversary of the Helvetica typeface.	Domino

=== EPs ===
Title	Release date	Notes	Label
Paris 25	February 10, 1998		City Slang
TRRD	July 1998	With D	Soul Static Sound
Pantone	October 15, 2001	With I-Sound	City Slang

=== Singles ===
Title	Release date	Album	Label
"She Understands the Dynamics"	April 27, 1998		FatCat Records
"Telema"	March 29, 1999	From The Amateur View	City Slang
"Cars"	September 20, 1999	From The Amateur View	City Slang
"Jacky" / "Crosby"	April 18, 2000	Sub Pop 7" Singles Series	Sub Pop
"Smaller Listening" / "Numbers In Love"	2000	7" With D	Soul Static Sound
"Cosimo"	June 21, 2004	From Hotel Morgen	Domino
"Horses, Horses, Horses"	December 3, 2008	Alternative, dance-oriented versions of two tracks later featured on Speculation	Domino

=== Compilations ===
Title	Release date	Notes	Label
Rocket Road 1997–2001	November 16, 2012	3-CD Box Set / Digital Release, reissuing Veiculo, The Amateur View and Music Is A Hungry Ghost, with previously unreleased bonus tracks and remixes by Four Tet, Daniel Miller, Gareth Jones, Mira Calix.	City Slang

== See also ==
- Sound of Water - Saint Etienne album featuring arrangements by To Rococo Rot
