= Instrument (album) =

Studio album by To Rococo Rot
- Released: July 21, 2014
- Genre: Rock
- Length: 38:14
- Label: City Slang

To Rococo Rot chronology
Speculation (2010)	Instrument (2014)

Professional ratings
Aggregate scores
Source	Rating
Metacritic	77/100
Review scores
Source	Rating
NME	6/10

Instrument is the eighth studio album by German band To Rococo Rot. It was released in July 2014 under City Slang Records.

== Track list ==
No.	Title	Length
1.	"Many Descriptions" (featuring Arto Lindsay)	4:11
2.	"Besides"	3:07
3.	"Down in the Traffic"	4:50
4.	"Classify" (featuring Arto Lindsay)	3:06
5.	"Baritone"	4:24
6.	"Spreading the Strings Out"	3:21
7.	"Pro Model"	3:48
8.	"Sunrise"	1:31
9.	"Glitter"	3:20
10.	"Longest Escalator in the World" (featuring Arto Lindsay)	6:36
