= Infinite Love Songs =

Studio album by Maximilian Hecker
- Released: October 16, 2001
- Genre: Pop rock
- Length: 57:52
- Label: Kitty-Yo

Maximilian Hecker chronology
Infinite Love Songs (2001)	Rose (2003)

Professional ratings
Review scores
Source	Rating
AllMusic	4/5 stars

Infinite Love Songs is the debut studio album by German musician Maximilian Hecker. It was released by Kitty-Yo in 2001.

== Track listing ==
1. "Polyester"
2. "Sunburnt Days"
3. "Green Night"
4. "The Days Are Long And Filled With Pain"
5. "White"
6. "Cold Wind Blowing"
7. "Over"
8. "Flower Four"
9. "Like Them"
10. "Infinite Love Song"
11. "Let Me Out"
12. "Today"
