= Malaria! =

German electronic band

- Origin: West Berlin, Germany
- Genres: Neue Deutsche Welle, industrial, electronic, experimental
- Years active: 1981–1993
- Label: Moabit Musik
- Past members: Gudrun Gut; Bettina Köster; Beate Bartel; Manon P. Duursma; Christine Hahn; Susanne Kuhnke

Malaria! was a German post-punk experimental electronic music band from West Berlin, formed in 1981 by Gudrun Gut and Bettina Köster following the dissolution of Mania D with Karin Luner, Eva Gossling (of Die Krupps) and Beate Bartel (of Liaisons Dangereuses). Other members included Manon P. Duursma, Christine Hahn (founding member of no wave bands Daily Life, the Static, and CKM with Kim Gordon), and Susanne Kuhnke (also a member of Die Haut). They are most often associated with Neue Deutsche Welle and no wave.

Malaria!'s most popular record was New York Passage (produced by Eric Dufaure for Cachalot Records), which was top 10 in both U.S. and European independent music charts and led to a tour with the Birthday Party, John Cale, and Nina Hagen.

There are videos for the songs "Geld/Money", "Your Turn to Run", and "You, You" (directed by Anne Carlisle) along with a live video for "Thrash Me" featured in a German documentary called Super 80.

In 2001, an EP of Malaria! covers entitled Versus was released and included a popular cover of "Kaltes Klares Wasser" by Chicks on Speed.

== Discography ==
- 1981: Malaria (12")
- 1981: How Do You Like My New Dog? (7")
- 1982: Emotion (LP)
- 1982: New York Passage (12")
- 1982: White Water (12")
- 1983: Revisited – Live (cassette)
- 1984: Beat the Distance (12")
- 1991: Compiled (CD)
- 1991: Kaltes Klares Wasser (CDM)
- 1992: Elation (CDM)
- 1993: Cheerio (CD)
- 2001: Compiled 1981–1984 (CD)
