= Barbara Morgenstern =

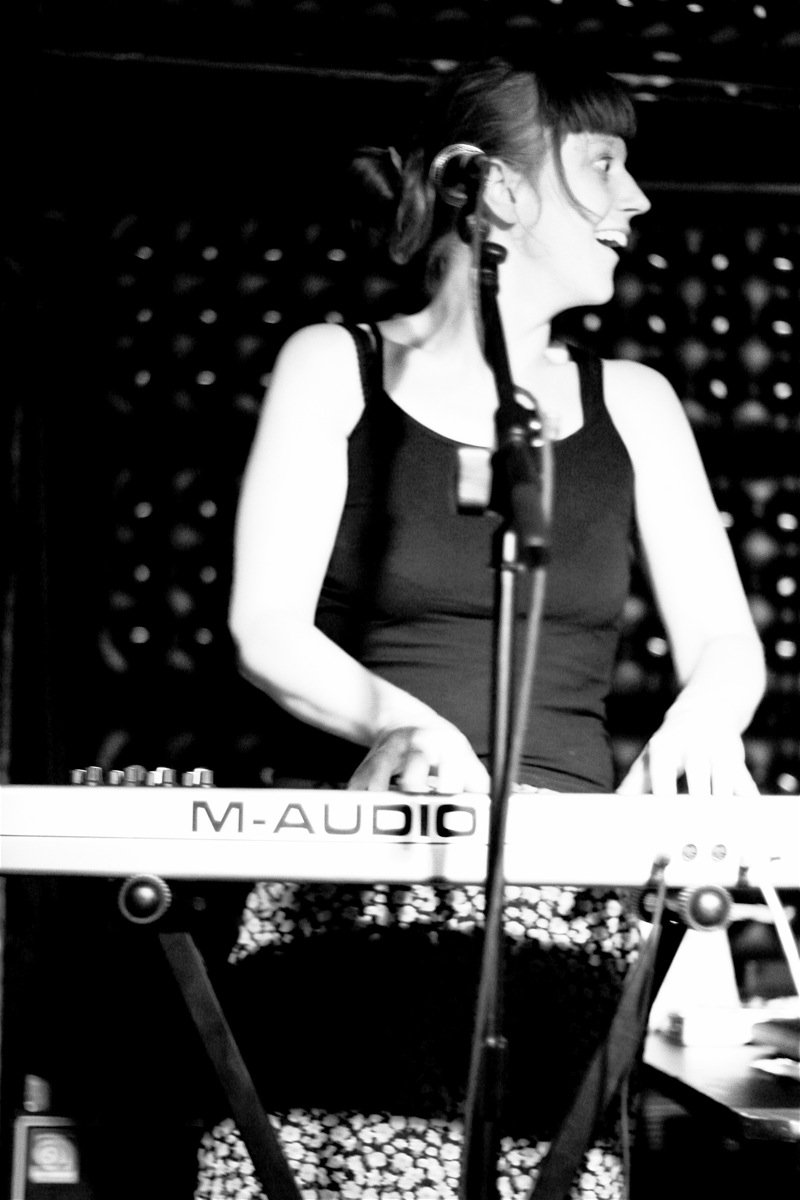
- Morgenstern performing in 2006

Background information
- Born: 19 March 1971 (age 55); Hagen, West Germany
- Origin: Berlin, Germany
- Genres: Electronic, synth-pop
- Occupations: Vocalist, remixer, producer
- Instruments: Vocals, piano, guitar
- Years active: 1997–present
- Label: Monika Enterprise
- Website: www.barbaramorgenstern.de

Barbara Morgenstern (born 19 March 1971) is a German electronic music artist, keyboardist and singer.

== Biography ==
Born in Hagen, Germany, Morgenstern describes herself as self-taught, although she had piano lessons as a child and jazz lessons at the school of music in Hagen. In addition to having played in a band, she decided on a career in music in 1991 after completing her schooling at the Ernst Meister Gymnasium in Hagen-Haspe.

From 1992 to 1994 she lived in Hamburg and was active there as a musician, with her own music and as a singer in an a cappella group. At the Hamburg University of Music she took part in a six-week popular music course.

In 1994 she moved to Berlin, where she first played as a keyboardist in a band and from 1996 concentrated on her own music, especially electronic music.

From 1998 to 2017 she released her solo albums on Gudrun Gut's label Monika Enterprise.

In 2004, at the invitation of the Goethe-Institut, Morgenstern undertook a 34-date world tour together with Maximilian Hecker.

Bill Wells' 2004 mini-album Pick Up Sticks featured contributions from Morgenstern on two tracks. She also joined Paul Wirkus and To Rococo Rot's Stefan Schneider in September Collective, a project which had its origins in encores that they joined to play at their own individual concerts while on tour in Poland. September Collective's eponymous debut album was released on the Geographic label, an offshoot of Domino Records run by the Pastels' Stephen Pastel. Morgenstern's next solo album was The Grass Is Always Greener (2006).

In 2008 Morgenstern's fifth album bm was released, this time less electronic but more orchestral. The track Come To Berlin paints a pessimistic picture of Berlin's current urban development. In 2011 Morgenstern released a cover version of the Prince song "Sign o' the Times" from his album Sign o’ the Times.

The records "Fan No. 2", "Sweet Silence" and "Doppelstern" were following. "Doppelstern" is a collaboration album with Gudrun Gut, Justus Köhncke, T. Raumschmiere, Lucrecia Dalt, Tonia Reeh, Corey Dargel, Hauschka, Richard Davis, Jacaszek, Coppe and Julia Kent.

"Unschuld & Verwüstung" (2018) is her first release on the Berlin-based label Staatsakt. The main components of the album are harmonium, piano, vocals, electronics and saxophone.

=== Choir works ===
From 2007 to 2021 she directed the "Choir of World Cultures" at the Haus der Kulturen der Welt/ Berlin together with Philipp Neumann. She composed and arranged for the choir and curated the musical programme in collaboration with the HKW.

Collaborations in the context of choral conducting took place with:

Matthew Herbert & Brexit Big Band, Arto Lindsay, Van Dyke Parks, Harmonia, Fatima Al Qadiri, Roedelius, September Collective, Meridian Brothers, Ari Benjamin Meyers, Hauschka and others.

=== Theater works ===
Since 2012, she has worked regularly with the theatre group Rimini Protokoll. In past productions, Barbara Morgenstern has appeared both as a live performer and as a composer (compositions for children's choir/ "Do's & Dont's" and compositions for chamber orchestra/ "All right. Good night") and sound designer.

The productions „Chinchilla Arschloch, waswas.“ and „All right. Good night.“ were both invited to the Berlin Theatertreffen.

She also works frequently with the performance collective Showcase Beat le Mot.

=== Documentary film ===
In 2024, the documentary film Barbara Morgenstern und die Liebe zur Sache by Sabine Herpich was released.

== Discography ==
- 1997: Enter the Partyzone (Tape, Hausfrau im Schacht)
- 1997: Plastikreport (Mini-CD, Klub der guten Hoffnung)
- 1998: Vermona ET 6–1 (CD, Monika Enterprise)
- 2000: Fjorden (Album, Monika Enterprise)
- 2003: Nichts Muss (Album, Monika Enterprise / Labels)
- 2005: Tesri (Album, with Robert Lippok, Monika Enterprise)
- 2006: The Operator (Single, Monika Enterprise)
- 2006: The Grass Is Always Greener (Album, Monika Enterprise)
- 2008: Come to Berlin (Single, Monika Enterprise)
- 2008: BM (Album, Monika Enterprise)
- 2010: Fan No.2 (Album, Monika Enterprise)
- 2012: Sweet Silence (Album, Monika Enterprise)
- 2015: Doppelstern (Album, Monika Enterprise)
- 2018: Unschuld und Verwüstung (Album, Staatsakt)
- 2024: In anderem Licht (Album, Staatsakt)

=== With September Collective ===
- 2004: September Collective (Album, Geographic / Domino)
- 2007: All the Birds Were Anarchists (Album, Mosz Records)
- 2009: Always Breathing Monster (Album, Mosz Records)

=== EPs ===
- Enter The Partyzone (cassette release, 1997)
- Plastikreport (1997)
- Fan No.1 (1999) Remix-EP, Monika Enterprise; remixes by Console & Heimtrainer, Robert Lippok, Schlammpeitziger, Michael Muehlhaus und Jo Tabu
- Eine Verabredung (10" vinyl, 2001)
- Seasons (with Robert Lippok, 2002)
- Himmelmixe (2003)
- Come To Berlin Mixes (2008)
- Silence Sweater EP (Remix EP of the track 'Sweet Silence', 2012)
- Spring's Sprung EP (Remix EP of the track 'Spring Time'. Released on the Bit-Phalanx label, 2014)

Theater Productions

- 2012: Lagos Business Angels/ Rimini Protokoll
- 2014: Qualitätskontrolle/ Rimini Protokoll
- 2016: Brain Projekts/ Rimini Protokoll
- 2018: Do's & Don'ts/ Rimini Protokoll
- 2019: Chinchilla Arschloch, was/ Rimini Protokoll
- 2020: Die Schwarze Mühle/ Showcase Beat le Mot
- 2021: All right. Good night./ Rimini Protokoll
- 2023: Der Kauakasische Kreidekreis/ Rimini Protokoll/ Salzburger Festpiele
- 2024: Ever Given/ Rimini Protokoll/ Volkstheater Wien
