= Music Is a Hungry Ghost =

Music is a Hungry Ghost

Studio album by To Rococo Rot & I-Sound
- Released: May 8, 2001
- Recorded: October 1998 – January 2001
- Genre: Electronica; IDM; Experimental techno Post-rock
- Length: 45:48
- Label: Mute; City Slang 20177-2
- Producer: To Rococo Rot; I-Sound

To Rococo Rot & I-Sound chronology
The Amateur View (1999)	Music is a Hungry Ghost (2001)	Kölner Brett (2001)

Professional ratings
Review scores
Source	Rating
Allmusic	4/5 stars
Almost Cool	77.5%
Launch	4/5 stars
Pitchfork Media	8.5/10
Splendid	favourable

Music is a Hungry Ghost is an album by the German post-rock group To Rococo Rot in collaboration with the New York City turntablist I-Sound. It was released on May 8, 2001 and was the band's first album for the Mute Records label.

== Track listing ==
All songs written by I-Sound and To Rococo Rot.

1. "A Number of Things" – 4:16
2. "For a Moment" – 4:35
3. "How We Never Went to Bed" – 4:18
4. "First" – 2:30
5. "From Dream to Daylight" – 4:14
6. "Your Secrets, a Few Words" – 3:14
7. "Along the Route" – 2:57
8. "Overhead" – 4:09
9. "Koko" – 0:38
10. "Pantone" – 2:59
11. "Mazda in the Mist" – 4:22
12. "She Tended to Forget" – 2:30
13. "The Trance of Travel" – 5:00
