= Couch (German band) =

German post-rock band

- Origin: Munich, Germany
- Genres: Post-rock, math rock, experimental rock
- Years active: 1993–2006
- Labels: Kitty-Yo, Morr Music, Matador, Kollaps
- Past members: Stefanie Böhm; Jürgen Söder; Michael Heilrath; Thomas Geltinger

Couch was an instrumental post-rock band based in Munich, Germany. The band released music on Kitty-Yo Records and starting in 2000 licensed their music to Matador Records for American distribution, issuing full-lengths in 2000 and 2001 concurrently on those labels. In 2006, they released their final album, Figur 5, on Morr Music.

The group's sound is heavily indebted to the German Krautrock bands of the 1970s.

== Members ==
- Jürgen Söder (Guitar)
- Thomas Geltinger (Drums)
- Michael Heilrath (Bass)
- Stefanie Böhm (Keyboards); also plays in Ms. John Soda.

== Discography ==
- Couch (LP) (Kollaps) (1995)
- 3/Suppenkoma (7") (Kollaps) (1996)
- Etwas benutzen (LP/CD) (Kollaps/Kitty-Yo) (1997)
- Fantasy (Kollaps/Kitty-Yo/Matador) (August, 2000)
- Profane (Kollaps/Kitty-Yo/Matador) (April, 2001)
- Figur 5 (Morr Music) (June, 2006)
