= Maximilian Hecker =

German musician from Berlin (born 1977)

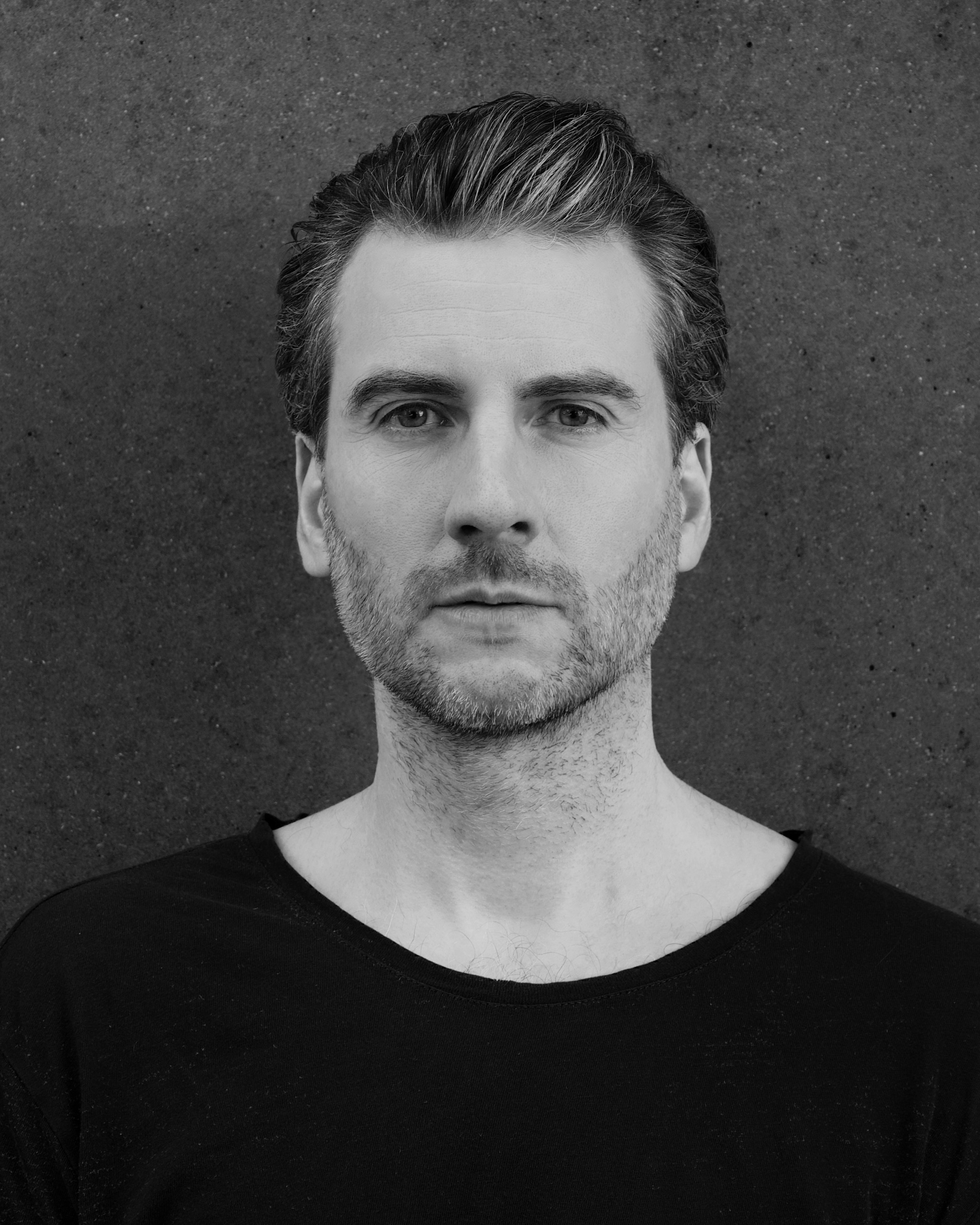
Maximilian Hecker, 2023, by Julija Goyd

Maximilian Hecker (born July 26, 1977, in Heidenheim an der Brenz) is a German musician from Berlin, known for ethereal pop or dream pop music, similar to Radiohead, Sigur Rós, Tom Baxter and Nick Drake. He himself describes his songs as »melancholy pop hymns«.

Hecker grew up in Baden-Wuerttemberg and North Rhine-Westphalia. He learned to play the piano, the drums and the guitar and did his A levels at Freiherr-vom-Stein-Gymnasium in Bünde in 1997. Having finished his alternative civilian service at Klinikum Schwabing in Munich, he started training in nursing practice at the hospital Charité in Berlin in 1999.

== Career ==
Apart from his activities as a trainee nurse, Hecker continued pursuing his musical hobby busking in the area of Hackescher Markt in Berlin-Mitte. Thus he came in contact with Berlin's music- and cultural scene. In 2000, the demo of his song Cold Wind Blowing was used for the score of German director Esther Gronenborn's movie Alaska.de. Soon after that, the Berlin-based record company Kitty-yo, having released the movie's soundtrack, offered Hecker a record deal.

=== Infinite Love Songs ===
In October 2001, Hecker released his debut album Infinite Love Songs, produced in cooperation with German producer Tommi Eckart. The album was critically acclaimed worldwide and even reached the top ten list of The New York Times’ album of the year contest in 2001. Hence, Hecker's debut was to be found amongst albums of Bob Dylan, The White Stripes and Alicia Keys. Critic Neil Strauss writes:

»In a long list of precious, fragile, heartbroken artists to emerge in the last two years (Tom McRae, Ed Harcourt, the Kingsbury Manx), Mr. Hecker, by legend an oft-disparaged Berlin street musician, whispers the most precious and fragile heartbreak of them all.«

From October 2001 to February 2002, Hecker went on his first European tour – at that time solo, with electric guitar, keyboard and groovebox –, as a headliner mostly, but also as an opening act for Bill Callahan, the Walkabouts and others. Around that time, his song Polyester became a hit in Israeli mainstream radio and was considered a peace anthem. In April and May 2002, Hecker opened for Lloyd Cole on his tour of France.

=== Rose ===
In May 2003, Hecker put out his second studio album Rose, produced by British producer Gareth Jones, who had previously worked with Depeche Mode and Erasure. In particular the British press praised the record. Dan Martin from British music magazine New Musical Express writes:

»In the first three minutes, a lovelorn Hecker bemoans how he’s spent seven days without a glance from Kate Moss. But if the former busker has something of the stalker about him, he’s not one of those men who have bad fringes and still live with their mum. "Rose", Hecker's second LP, is as beautiful and barbed as the flower itself and proves that sinister can also be suave and beautiful. While his sexless Germanic vocals threaten to get smothered in drippy melancholy, he’s wise enough to ease off with the string quartets as things progress, transmuting his snail pace into the kind of pin-drop quiet electro Fischerspooner would make after a pint of heroin. Lovely.«

Then Neil Tennant from Pet Shop Boys, having taken notice of Hecker, started to communicate Hecker's music to others on his website. In May and June 2003, soon after releasing Rose, Hecker went on his second European tour, followed by his third one in September and October of the same year, opening for Cat Power in Clermont-Ferrand, France, and this time supported by live musicians Jens Friebe on keyboard, Hans Narva on bass and Chris Imler on drums.

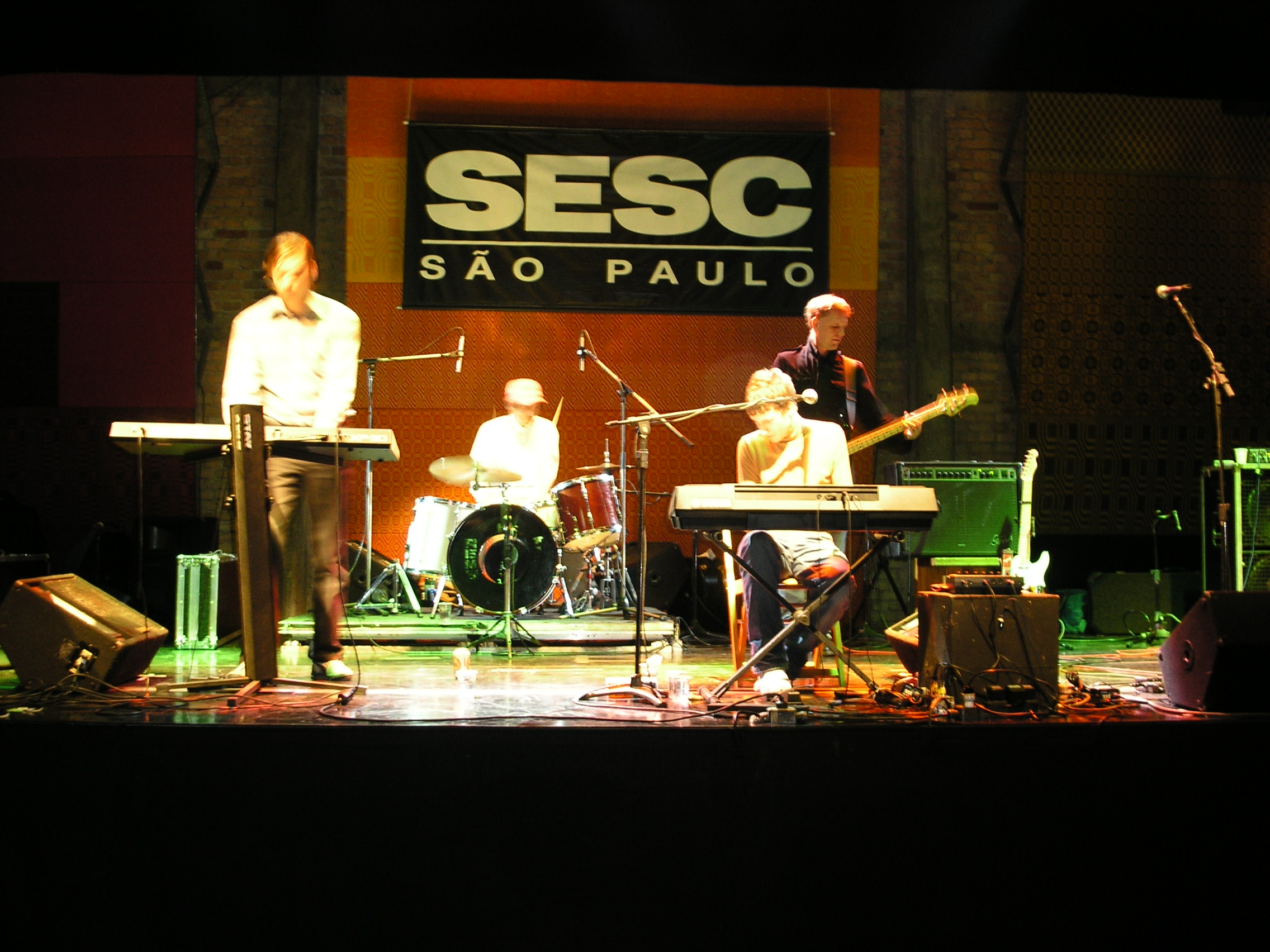
Maximilian Hecker & Band at »SESC Pompéia« in São Paulo, Brazil, October 28, 2003

In September 2003, South Korean record company Pastel Music released Hecker's first two albums in South Korea, and from October 2003 to March 2004, Hecker and German musician Barbara Morgenstern were sent on a worldwide tour through 34 cities by German cultural institution Goethe-Institut.

=== Lady Sleep ===
In January 2005, Hecker released his third studio album Lady Sleep (produced by Israelite, Berlin-based producer Guy Sternberg) in Europe and later that year in South Korea. In January and February, he went on his fourth tour of Europe, supported by Johannes Feige on electric guitar, Philipp Neumann on bass and Snorre Schwarz respectively Nicolai Ziel on drums. Jim Butler of BBC Collective about Lady Sleep:

»On 'Lady Sleep', his third album, the criminally underrated Maximilian Hecker returns to his recurring fascination with affairs of the heart. Although simpler (ie, less electronic) than his last album, 'Rose', 'Lady Sleep' is just as evocative: opulent orchestral symphonies sway with a shimmering elegance, the neo-Baroque chamber pop hints at stunning torch songs for the 21st Century and Hecker’s softly spoken vocals are gently affecting. Less camp than Antony And The Johnsons, although just as grand, Berliner Hecker, in anyone’s language, deserves to be a star.«

In July 2005, Hecker was invited to Seoul, South Korea, to play two gigs, and in June 2006, he was sent to Taipei, Taiwan, to give two concerts, after the Taiwanese record company Avant Garden Records had released his first three albums in Taiwan in August 2005.

=== I'll Be a Virgin, I'll Be a Mountain ===
In summer 2006 he changed from Kitty-yo to V2 Records and released his fourth studio album, I'll Be a Virgin, I'll Be a Mountain (again produced by Guy Sternberg) in Europe, South Korea and Taiwan in September 2006. Unlike his three predecessors, which Hecker had recorded on his own for the most part, the album was brought about with the aid of a number of studio musicians, amongst them Snorre Schwarz, Hecker's live drummer. Sharon O’Connell from British music magazine Uncut reviewed I'll Be a Virgin, I'll Be a Mountain in the magazine's December issue 2006:

»Comparing Hecker to Chris Martin may be something of a backhanded compliment, but it’s an indication of the 29-year-old’s potential reach, rather than an indictment of aesthetic weediness. That said, "I’ll Be A Virgin…" is a hushed introspective affair, its sweetly mournful melodies augmented by tasteful string arrangements and carrying somewhat poetically strained lyrics ("Wilted Flower" distinguishes itself on that count). Toward the album’s close, a dreary sameness sets in; simpler songs like the folky "Messed-up Girl" are Hecker’s most effective.«

In October and November 2006, Hecker went on his fifth European tour, followed by concerts in Taipei and Seoul in November and December of the same year, and finally by him opening for Irish musician Duke Special on his tour of Europe in March 2007. Around that time, Hecker's song Dying was chosen as background music for a commercial of electronics group Samsung, broadcast in South Korea and China.

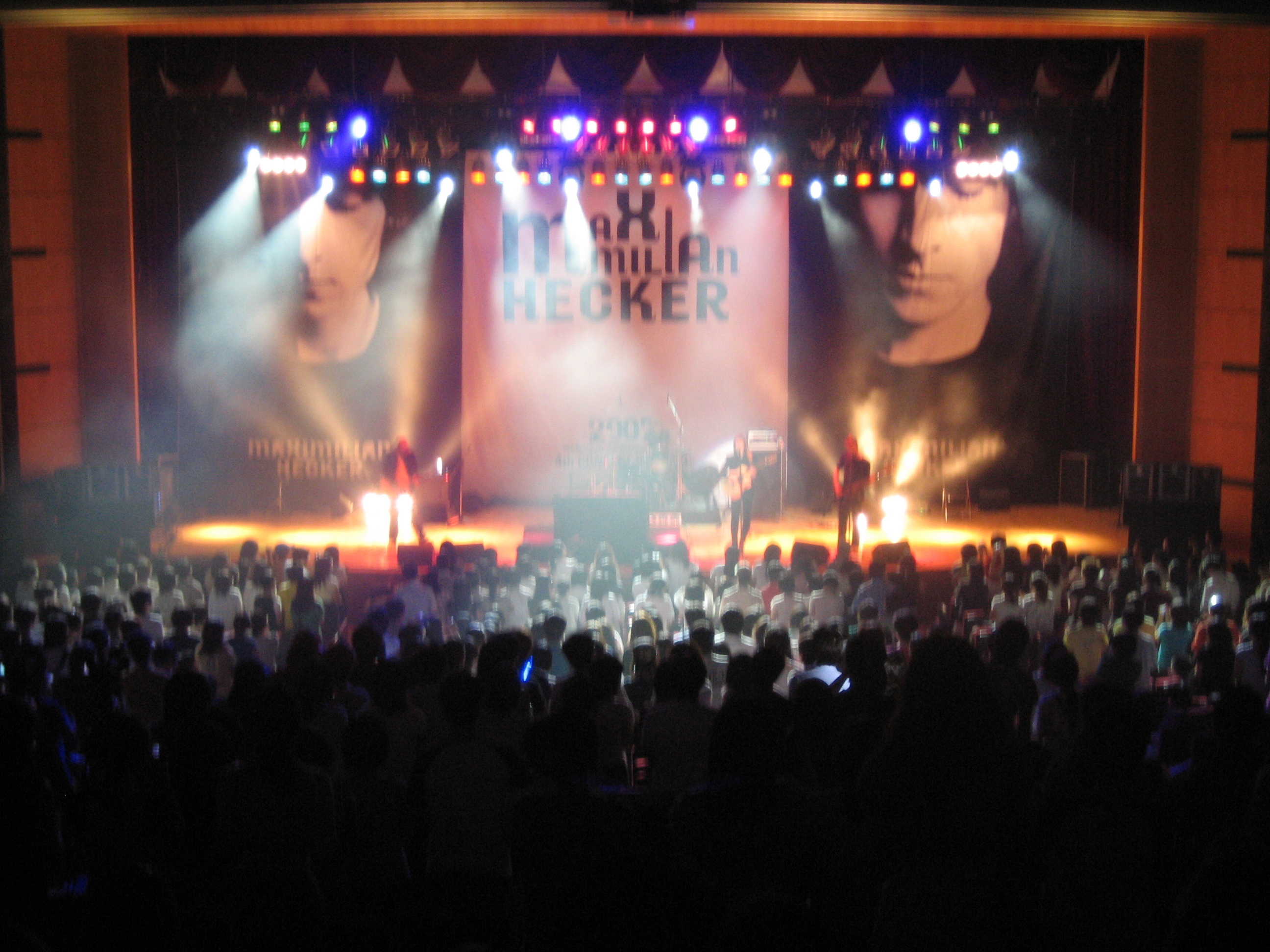
Maximilian Hecker & Band at »Kon Kook University Millennium Hall« in Seoul, South Korea, July 13th 2007

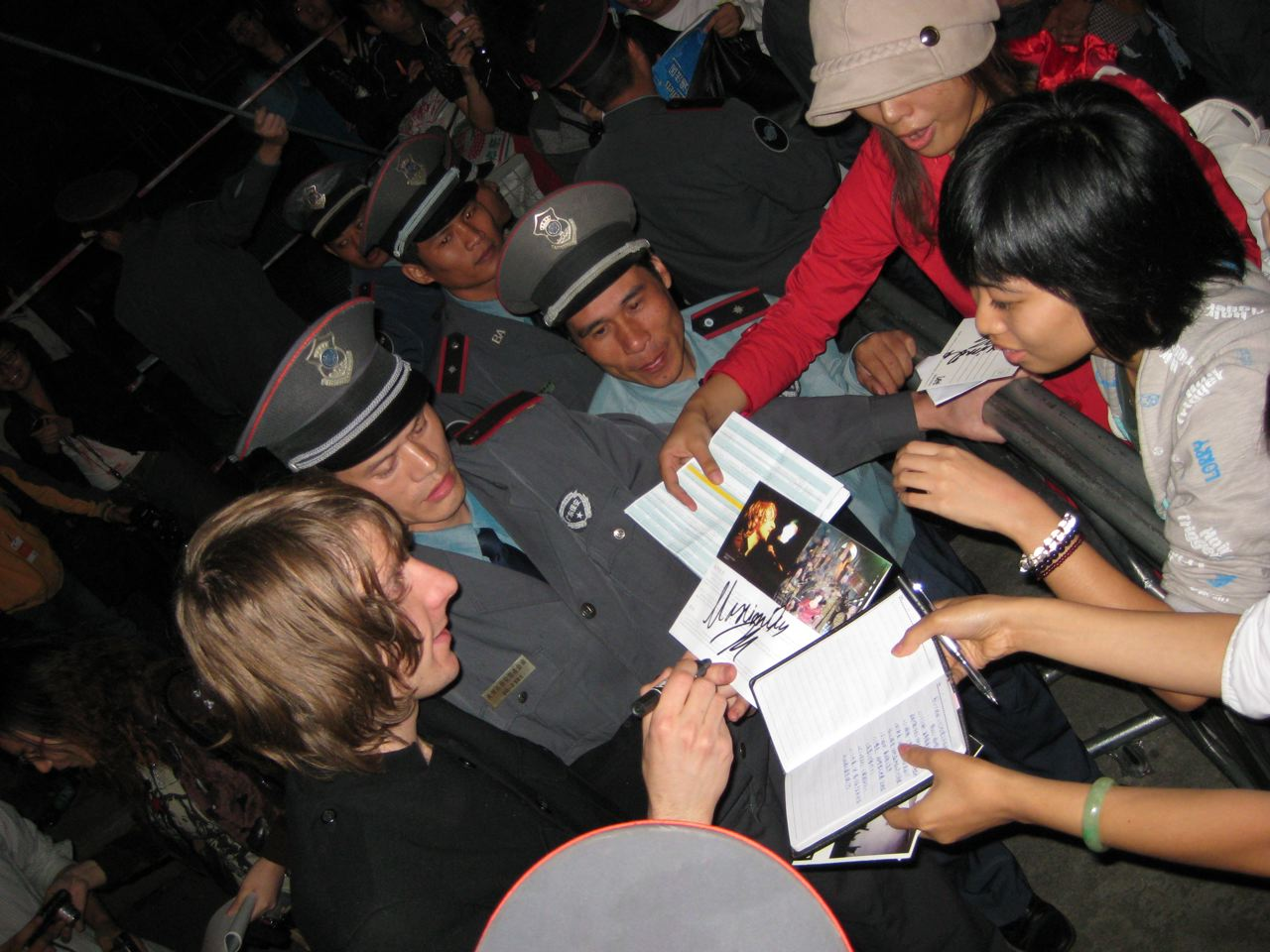
Maximilian Hecker signing autographs after a concert in Guangzhou, China, November 2008

In early 2007, Hecker recorded an EP, entitled Once I Was, especially for the East Asian market. The record contains cover versions only, and was released, along with a best-of-compilation of his songs, in Taiwan, South Korea, and for the first time in Mainland China (there entitled I Am Falling Now) in May respectively June that year. The album offered the opportunity to send Hecker on his fifth tour of Asia, leading him through Taiwan, South Korea and Mainland China in July of the same year.

In November 2007, Hecker's former record label Kitty-yo released the live album Live Radio Sessions as a digital release, the majority of its titles recordings of a concert that Hecker had given at Radio Bremen on March 2, 2005.

=== One Day ===
In May 2008, he made a flying visit to Mainland China and Hong Kong, and in autumn of the same year, he released his fifth studio album One Day in South Korea, Taiwan, Mainland China and, for the first time, in Hong Kong, Malaysia and Singapore (on Hong Kong based record label Love Da Records). The record had again been produced by Guy Sternberg and had come into being with the participation of Hecker's live band. The release was followed by his seventh Asian tour, leading Hecker through South Korea, Mainland China, Hong Kong and Taiwan.

In the meantime, Hecker had started to write songs for other musicians, and his song »Miss Underwater« was chosen the first single of Taiwanese singer Faith Yang's album Self-Selected in April 2009. At the same time, the fast food chain Dunkin' Donuts took Hecker's song Silly Lily, Funny Bunny as background music for one of their commercials broadcast in South Korea.

In April/May 2009, One Day was released in Europe on Berlin based record label Louisville Records respectively on Roadrunner Records, followed by Hecker's seventh tour of Europe in May and June 2009. Cracked Webzine about One Day in April 2009:

»So, after all and taking all of the above into account, Hecker might be headed into a completely different direction and is straight on the way to become the James Taylor of the digital age. Nothing bad about that, actually, I like the first Taylor-albums as much as anybody (and also Carole King, Rickie Lee Jones, Joni Mitchell or Bill Withers, to be honest) and after all he has penned a few songs that will stay in the canon of modern songwriting for ever without ever becoming kitschy or pathetic. Which in itself is basically more than 99.9 % of all songwriters of the last five years have done. I cannot say which of the songs on “One Day”, if any, will ever reach that status, because that is for the next decades to show.«

In October and November 2009, Hecker went on his eighth Asian tour through Taiwan, South Korea and Mainland China. Inspired by a solo performance in the context of the concert series FM4 Radio Sessions at Radiokulturhaus in Vienna, Austria, on March 26th, 2009, Hecker returned to performing his concerts solo, without live musicians, preferably on a grand piano.

=== I Am Nothing But Emotion, No Human Being, No Son, Never Again Son ===
In January, Hecker established his own record label Blue Soldier Records, where, in March (respectively May) of the same year, he released his sixth studio album in Europe: I Am Nothing But Emotion, No Human Being, No Son, Never Again Son. This record, accomplished without producer or studio musicians, and, like his debut Infinite Love Songs mainly a home recording, portrayed a return to Hecker's roots. In the course of the year, I Am Nothing But Emotion, No Human Being, No Son, Never Again Son was released in South Korea, Taiwan (by this time on Gold Typhoon Music), Mainland China, Hong Kong, Malaysia and Singapore. Erin Lyndal Martin reviewed the album for PopMatters in May 2010:

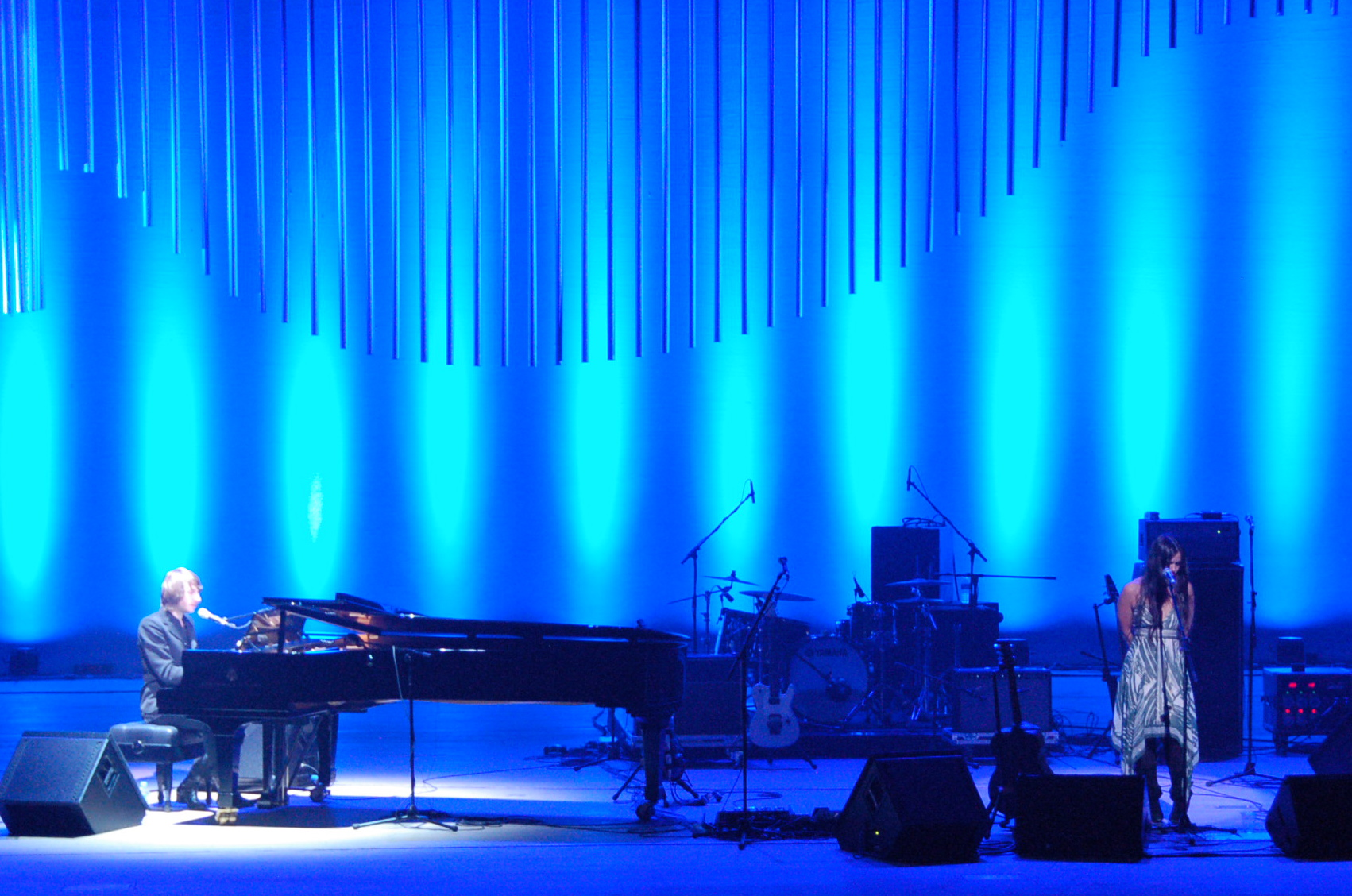
Maximilian Hecker and Rachael Yamagata at »Sejong Cultural Center« in Seoul, South Korea, January 23rd 2011

»Perhaps the most startling, out of character moment is on the opening track, “Blue Soldier Night”, which is delivered in a robotic female voice. This is nothing new, but it shows some levity that one wouldn’t expect from Hecker. Paradoxically, the song becomes that much more moving for that aspect, especially when the robot delivers the title line, “I am nothing but emotion”, which would sound simply insipid had it been delivered by Hecker. When the formula works, it really works. The simply beautiful “Glaslights” [sic] is evidence of this, with its ambient piano and quiet vocals. There are some nice touches here as well, such as the sound of the piano pedals rising and falling, lending an intimate immediacy to the song. “There are angels in the glaslights [sic]”, Hecker sings soothingly. “The Greatest Love of All” (not a Whitney Houston cover—promise!) features quiet acoustic guitar arpeggios that augment the piano. On an album this piano-heavy, the guitar is a nice touch. Unfortunately, this is one of three songs that rely on angel imagery in order to survive. While one could claim this is a concept album about angels, that would still be a trite concept for any album that’s not contemporary Christian (and even then, it’d be a little dicey). “You’ll Come Home Again” is a highlight because of its perfect melody. Hecker displays less vocal monotony here than his usual, one-note-albeit-heartfelt one.«

In April and May 2010, Hecker played the first part of an extensive Chinese tour of 24 Chinese cities – he accomplished the second part in the autumn of the same year –, and his song Kun Zai, written along with Sodagreen singer Wu Qingfeng, was released as the first single of Taiwanese singer Wei Ruxuan's album Graceful Porcupine in Taiwan and Mainland China. In the course of his current release, Hecker went on a tour of Germany in June of the same year.

In November 2010, he released the two albums Favourite Demos and Rare and Unreleased digitally. These albums contain the demos of 27 songs from his first five albums, as well as twelve B-sides and other songs unreleased up to then.

On January 23, 2011, Hecker gave a joint concert, along with American musician Rachael Yamagata at Sejong Cultural Center in Seoul, South Korea, and in autumn of the same year, he played his 8th Chinese tour – that took him to Shanghai, Shenyang, Beijing, Hangzhou and Foshan.

=== Mirage of Bliss ===
Then, in July/August/October 2012, he released his seventh studio album Mirage of Bliss in Germany, Austria, Switzerland, the UK, Ireland, Norway, Belgium, the Netherlands, Luxembourg, France, Italy, Japan and the USA, again on his own record label Blue Soldier Records, and in autumn of the same year, the album was released in Mainland China (by this time on Gold Typhoon Music), Taiwan, Hong Kong, Malaysia, Singapore and South Korea (by this time on Leeway). On the album, produced by British producer Martin Glover a.k.a. Youth, who had previously worked with Paul McCartney, The Verve and Embrace, Hecker once more plays all instruments, except for the bass guitar which is contributed by Glover. With its lush Britpop sound, Mirage Of Bliss could be regarded as the opposite of its rough sounding predecessor I Am Nothing But Emotion, No Human Being, No Son, Never Again Son.

=== The Rise and Fall of Maximilian Hecker ===
In August of the same year, German publishing house Schwarzkopf & Schwarzkopf published Hecker's debut as a writer, the autobiographical book The Rise and Fall of Maximilian Hecker (written in German) in Germany, Austria and Switzerland. The very candid text deals with Hecker's career as a musician and his life between two worlds, Europe and Asia, and is an "intimate document of a self-discovery" (blurb).

The first part of Hecker’s tour promoting Mirage of Bliss took him to Taiwan and Mainland China in October and November 2012, the second part, in the context of which he played six concerts at Chinese concert halls as well as at »Seoul Jazz Festival«, followed in May 2013. From December 2012 to April 2013, Hecker played an extensive European tour, for the most part together with Polarkreis 18 singer Felix Räuber, before returning to China to play concerts in Shenzhen, Chengdu and Shanghai in September 2014.

=== Spellbound Scenes of My Cure ===
In January 2015, Maximilian Hecker released his eight studio album Spellbound Scenes of My Cure in Europe (Eat The Beat Music), Mainland China (Beijing Dragon Flying Culture Media), Taiwan (Avant Garden Records) and South Korea (Leeway). Spellbound Scenes of My Cure, which was produced by Johannes Feige and Hecker himself and was mixed by Tommi Eckart, could be regarded as a concept album, since it deals exclusively with places on earth that Hecker has traveled to. The release was accompanied by impressionist, self- filmed video films that Hecker had shot in the context of these travels.

=== The Best of Maximilian Hecker ===
Following a solo German concert tour in January 2015 and an East Asian one (China, Taiwan and South Korea) in spring of the same year, this time as a duo, with Johannes Feige contributing electric guitar and harmony vocals, Hecker, who had been active for 15 years at this point, released a retrospective of 30 songs, The Best of Maximilian Hecker, in Europe (Eat The Beat Music), Mainland China (Want U Music), Taiwan (Hinote) and South Korea (Leeway) in spring 2016. Between April and July of the same year, his Best of Maximilian Hecker-tour took him and his live musicians Johannes Feige and Nicolai Ziel again to China, Taiwan and South Korea, followed by another Mainland Chinese tour, titled Fancy April in April 2017. Between September 2017 and July 2018, Hecker took part as a live musician in the stage play Wie kann ich dich finden, zu mir ziehen und überreden zu bleiben (written by Anja Hilling and directed by Friederike Heller) at Mannheim National Theatre, for which he had also composed the songs and the score music.

=== Wretched Love Songs ===
In April and May 2018, Hecker released his ninth studio album Wretched Love Songs in Europe (Eat The Beat Music), Mainland China (Want U Music), Taiwan (Hinote) and South Korea (Leeway). The album was recorded and produced in the same fashion as his predecessor, Spellbound Scenes of My Cure, together with Johannes Feige (arrangement and production) und Tommi Eckart (mix). The Asian tour to promote Wretched Love Songs took place in April and May 2019 and in September 2019 respectively, while the German leg of the tour followed in January 2019. In the same year, Hecker released the duets Headstone (with Rachael Yamagata) and The Flower (with Leo (VIXX)).

=== Lottewelt ===
In October 2023, Hecker's debut novel Lottewelt was published by German publishing house Lektora. The autofictional novel, divided into three parts and largely written in the language of prose poetry, takes place primarily in South Korea's capital Seoul, where the protagonist – as an idol of alternative music – is initially revered by the players of the local cultural scene and those of the Hallyu, the so-called »Korean Wave«, albeit, after a short period of intense courtship, invariably abandoned by them. The turbulent relationships with his admirers, depicted in the novel as Mephistophelian figures, ultimately inspire the protagonist to draw a metaphorical comparison between the Korean entertainment industry and the Seoul amusement park Lotte World. Nevertheless, as a result of a sudden memory of his origin, that is of his true identity, he feels at last able to reconcile with his foreign environment that he hitherto had experienced solely as confusing and hostile, namely by exposing his distorted idea of both Seoul and his Korean admirers as a mere projection, or, as the narrator puts it, a »hallyucination«. In this context he refers to Coldplay's song Everglow, with the »everglow« (or rather »eternal glow«) serving as a metaphor for the protagonist's true self. The main part of Lottewelt, however, tells the musician's love story with Korean actress Charlotte Lee, who confronts him with his traumatic family history, i.e. the early death of his severely disabled sister Liselotte, as Charlotte appears to be Liselotte's reincarnation. In an interview with German music magazine Mucke und Mehr, Hecker described the protagonist's relationship with his sister as the novel's »hidden key topic.«

The German cultural journal Kulturnews picked Lottewelt as one of seven titles to be featured in their column The finest books of 2024: Recommendations for January. Kulturnews editor Carsten Schrader about the novel:

“Unattainable love and the sorrow of beauty: Maximilian Hecker transfers his music's yearning into literature. Contrasted with early childhood traumas, the ubiquitous feeling of being lost and all the insecurities, he invents a fractured and romantic language for ›Lottewelt‹. In a remix with the masked worlds of K-Pop, this ultimately results in a picture puzzle – at the end of which lies self-discovery.“

=== Neverheart ===
In January 2024, Hecker released his tenth studio album Neverheart, recorded in collaboration with Johannes Feige (production) and Peter »Jem« Seifert (mix). In the abovementioned interview with Mucke und Mehr he designated »the absence of emotions, emotional ambivalence, inability to love, and commitment phobic behaviour« as the main topics of the album.

Jörn Schlüter of the German edition of Rolling Stone Magazine about Neverheart:

“On his tenth album, Maximilian Hecker, the great chronicler of unfulfilled love, sits at the piano all by himself, only carefully accompanied by spherical sounds and darkly reverberating drums. There've been larger arranged works in this career, but the piano is where one gets closest to the essence of these consistently quiet songs. On the opener, ›Two-toned Love (part I)‹, Hecker leads a drop-dead gorgeous melody through the chords. The hearts of the protagonists on ›Neverheart‹ are torn: Giving themselves away and yet staying alone. But however tragic their dissociated and unfulfilled existence should be – the accompanying bittersweet melody is just as comforting. An atmosphere so dense, a sentiment so immediate.“

== Discography ==
Albums:

- 2001 - Infinite Love Songs (CD/LP) - Kitty-yo
- 2003 - Rose (CD/LP) - Kitty-yo
- 2005 - Lady Sleep (CD/LP) - Kitty-yo
- 2006 - I'll Be a Virgin, I'll Be a Mountain (CD/LP) - V2 Records
- 2007 - Once I Was (CD) - Pastel Music / Avant Garden Records
- 2007 - I Am Falling Now (CD) - Pocket Records
- 2007 - Live Radio Sessions (digital) - Kitty-yo
- 2009 - One Day (CD/LP) - Louisville Records
- 2010 - I Am Nothing but Emotion, No Human Being, No Son, Never Again Son (CD/LP) - Blue Soldier Records
- 2010 - Favourite Demos (digital) - Blue Soldier Records
- 2010 - Rare and Unreleased (digital) - Blue Soldier Records
- 2012 - Mirage of Bliss (CD) - Blue Soldier Records
- 2015 - Spellbound Scenes of My Cure (CD) - Eat The Beat Music
- 2016 - The Best of Maximilian Hecker (digital) - Eat The Beat Music
- 2018 - Wretched Love Songs (digital) - Blue Soldier Records
- 2024 - Neverheart (digital) – Blue Soldier Records

Singles:

- 2001 - Infinite Love Song (CDM) - Kitty-yo
- 2001 - Polyester (CDM) - Kitty-yo
- 2003 - Fool (CDM) - Kitty-yo
- 2003 - Daylight (CDM) - Kitty-yo
- 2004 - Help Me (CDM) - Kitty-yo
- 2006 - Silly Lily, Funny Bunny (CDM) - V2 Records
- 2009 - Misery (digital) - Louisville Records
- 2009 - The Space that You're In (digital) - Louisville Records
- 2012 - It's All Over Now, Baby Blue (digital) - Blue Soldier Records
- 2012 - The Whereabouts of Love (digital) - Blue Soldier Records
- 2012 - Summerwaste (digital) - Blue Soldier Records
- 2014 - To Liu Wen, The Opposite House, 3 a.m. (digital) - Eat The Beat Music
- 2015 - Kastrup (digital) - Eat The Beat Music
- 2015 - Gangnam Misery (digital) - Eat The Beat Music
- 2016 - Hennigsdorf (digital) - Eat The Beat Music
- 2016 - Battery Park (digital) - Eat The Beat Music
- 2018 - My Wretched Love (digital) - Blue Soldier Records
- 2018 - Paradise on Earth (digital) - Blue Soldier Records
- 2018 - Into the Ocean (digital) - Blue Soldier Records
- 2019 - Headstone · Untouchable (digital) – Blue Soldier Records
- 2023 - Two-toned Love (part I) (digital) – Blue Soldier Records
- 2023 - Falling Star (digital) – Blue Soldier Records
- 2023 - Neverheart (digital) – Blue Soldier Records
- 2023 - Long-lost Crazy Love (digital) – Blue Soldier Records
- 2023 - Two-toned Love (part I) Remix (digital) – Blue Soldier Records
- 2024: The Whereabouts of Love - Remix (digital) – Blue Soldier Records
- 2025: Polyester - Remix (digital) – Blue Soldier Records

== Videography ==
- 2001 - Infinite Love Song (Magnus Winter)
- 2001 - Polyester (Jana Oberdörffer)
- 2003 - Fool (Miriam Yung Min Stein)
- 2003 - Daylight (Miriam Yung Min Stein)
- 2004 - Help Me (Liisa Lounila & Henri Tani)
- 2006 - Silly Lily, Funny Bunny (Christopher Weser)
- 2009 - The Space That You're In (Til Obladen)
- 2010 - Nana (Til Obladen)
- 2010 - No One's Child (Nuflicks)
- 2010 - Court My Eyes Alone (Ken-Tonio Yamamoto & Daniela Haitzler)
- 2012 - The Whereabouts of Love (Sonja Gutschera & Leif Henrik Osthoff)
- 2014 – To Liu Wen, The Opposite House, 3 a.m. (The Sorrows of Young Werther)
- 2015 – Kastrup (The Sorrows of Young Werther)
- 2015 – Gangnam Misery (The Sorrows of Young Werther)
- 2016 – Hennigsdorf (The Sorrows of Young Werther)
- 2016 – Battery Park (The Sorrows of Young Werther)
- 2018 – My Wretched Love (Julija Goyd)
- 2018 – Paradise on Earth (The Sorrows of Young Werther)
- 2018 – Into the Ocean (The Sorrows of Young Werther)
- 2023 – Two-toned Love (part I) (The Sorrows of Young Werther)
- 2023 – Falling Star (The Sorrows of Young Werther)
- 2023 – Neverheart (Til Obladen)
- 2023 – Long-lost Crazy Love (Til Obladen)
- 2023 – Two-toned Love (part I) Remix (The Sorrows of Young Werther)
- 2024 – Fall in Love, Fall Apart (Til Obladen)
- 2024: Two-toned Love (part II) (The Sorrows of Young Werther)
- 2024: Leave-taking Song (The Sorrows of Young Werther)
- 2024: The Whereabouts of Love - Remix (Sonja Gutschera & Leif Henrik Osthoff)
- 2024: Suspended Heart (The Sorrows of Young Werther)
- 2025: Polyester - Remix (Evangelische Schule Berlin Zentrum)

== Songwriting for other artists ==
- 2008 - The Space That You're In (music and lyrics) - artist: Wei Ruxuan, album: La Dolce Vita
- 2009 - Miss Underwater (music and lyrics) - artist: Faith Yang, album: Self-Selected
- 2010 - Kun Zai (music) - artist: Wei Ruxuan, album: Graceful Porcupine
- 2019 - The Flower (music and English lyrics) - artist: Leo (VIXX), album: MUSE

== Bibliography ==
- 2012 - The Rise and Fall of Maximilian Hecker. Schwarzkopf & Schwarzkopf, Berlin, Germany. ISBN 978-3-86265-176-4.

== Novel ==
- 2023 - Lottewelt. Lektora, Paderborn, Germany. ISBN 978-3-95461-250-5.
