= Gudrun Gut =

German musician

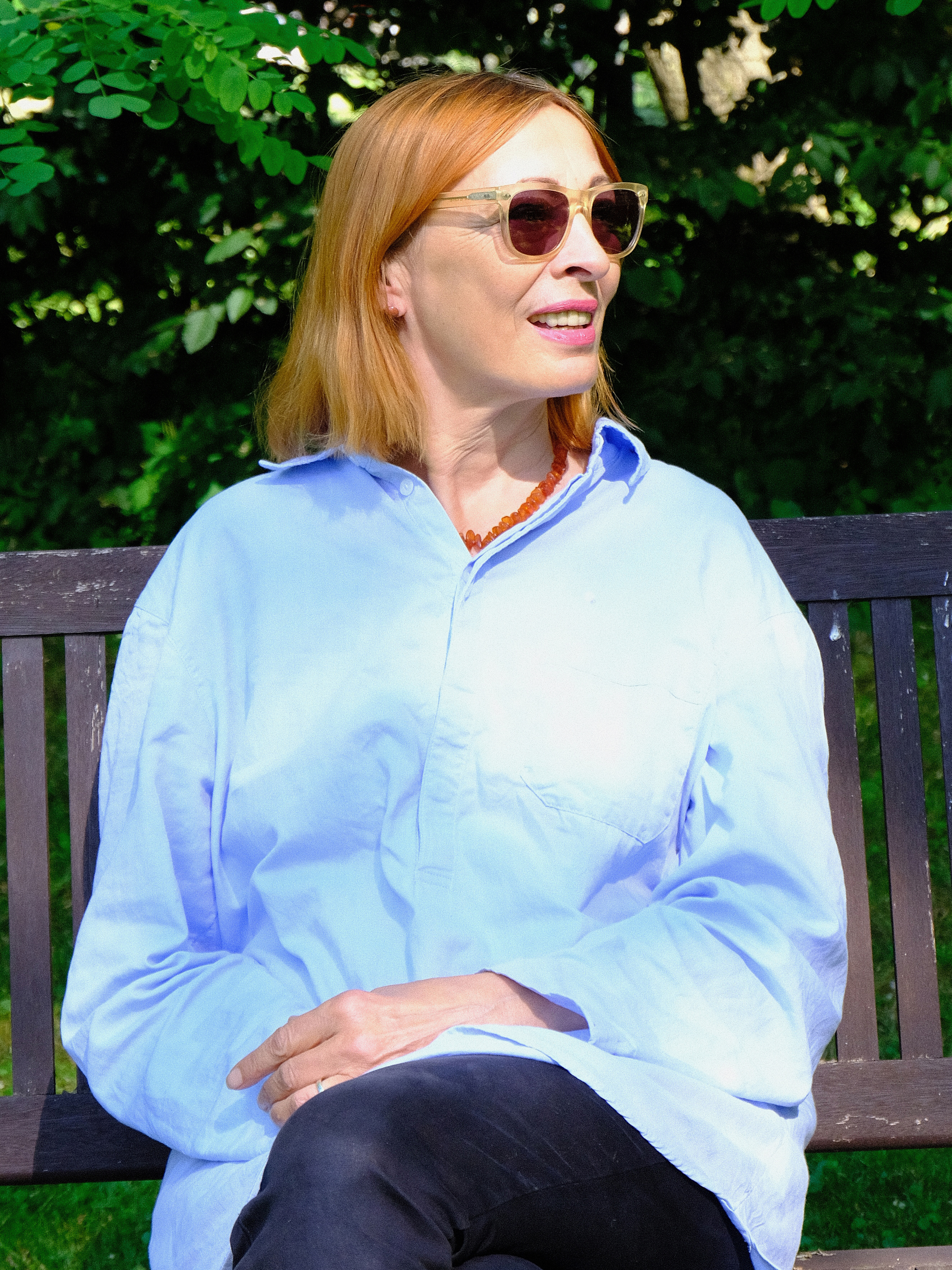
- Gut in 2020
- Born: 20 May 1957 (age 69)
- Education: Hochschule der Künste
- Occupation: Musician

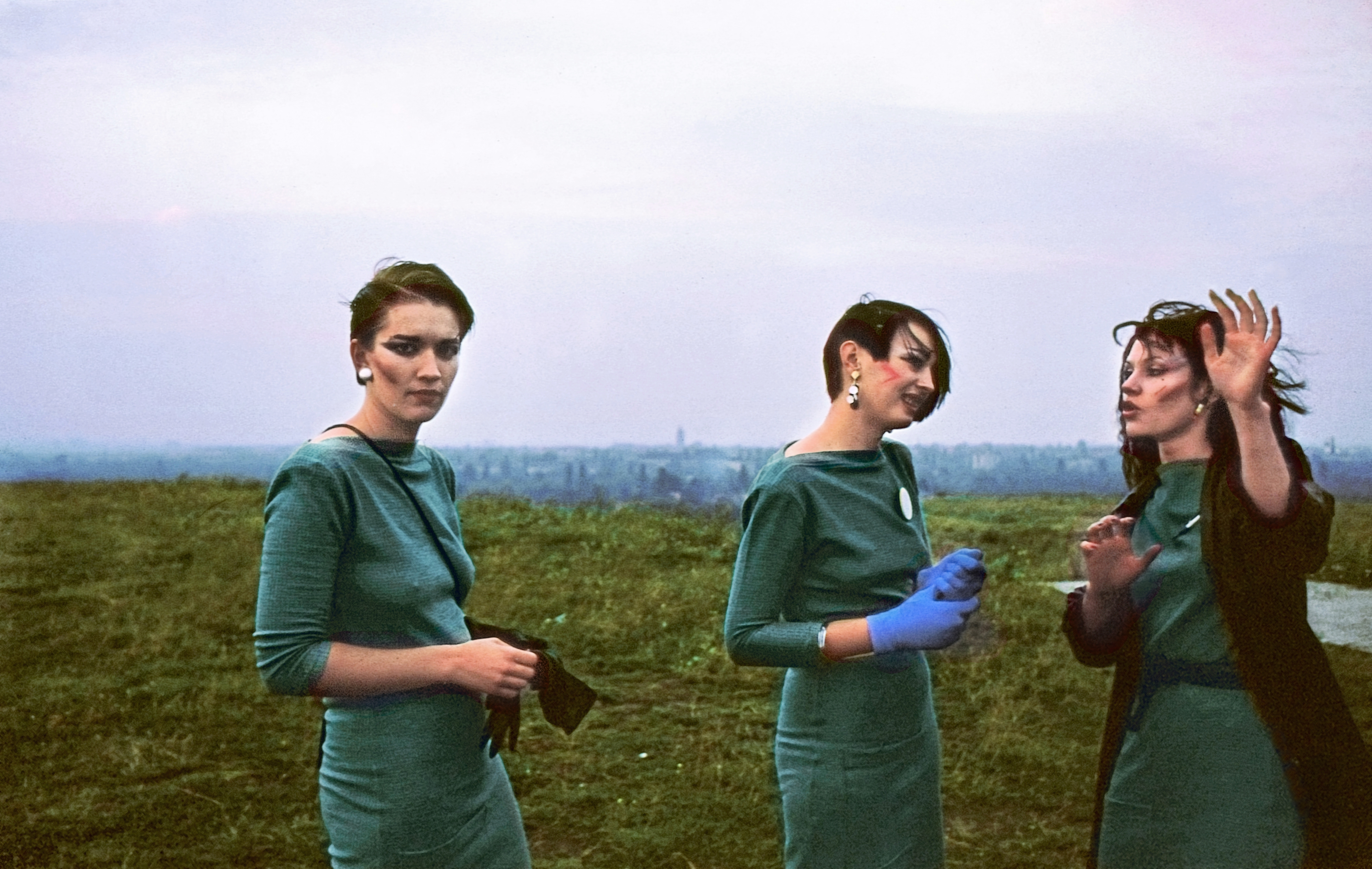
Mania D: Gudrun Gut (in the middle) with Karin Luner and Bettina Köster, 1979

Gudrun Gut (born 20 May 1957) is a German electronic musician, DJ, presenter, music producer and founder of the Monika Enterprise record label.

She grew up in the Lüneburger Heide and moved to West Berlin in 1975, where she studied visual arts at the Hochschule der Künste from 1978 to 1984. She was an early member of Einstürzende Neubauten and a founding member of music groups Mania D, Malaria!, Matador and spoken word project with Myra Davies, Miasma, evolving into a prolific solo career. She is the head of the labels Monika Enterprise and Moabit Musik. She co-presented the Oceanclub weekly radio program in Berlin with Thomas Fehlmann. Her debut solo album, I Put a Record On was released on 5 February 2007. Music critics saluted the openness and approachability of the music on the record.

According to The Wire magazine's April 2008 issue, which featured Gudrun Gut on the cover, "this 'dilettante' has genially hosted Berlin's new music scene for 30 years".

In 2024, Gut produced an autobiographical 3-episode miniseries for the German broadcaster RBB.

== Works ==
=== Selected discography ===
- 1980: White Christmas 7″ (with Tabea Blumenschein, Frieder Butzmann and Bettina Köster)
- 1993: Myra Davies & Gudrun Gut – Miasma
- 1996: YadiYAdi maxi single (with Anita Lane)
- 1996: Die Sonne maxi single (with Blixa Bargeld)
- 1996: Members of The Ocean Club CD (v. a. with Anita Lane, Danielle de Picciotto, Blixa Bargeld, Jovanka von Willsdorf, Jayney Klimek, Inga Humpe, Myra Davies, Katharina Franck and Manon P. Duursma)
- 1996: Firething maxi single (with Anita Lane)
- 2004: Members of The Ocean Club double CD (reissue with a remix CD containing mixes from Ellen Allien, Thomas Fehlmann, Effective Force, Ian Pooley, The Orb, Paul van Dyk, Klaus Schulze, Spinout and CoBra)
- 2005: Move Me 7″
- 2007: I Put A Record On CD
- 2007: In Pieces 12″ (remixes from Burger/Voigt, Pole, Dntel)
- 2007: Pleasure Train 7″
- 2008: Apples, Pears and Deer in Poland EP
- 2010: Baustelle CD (with AGF as Greie Gut Fraktion)
- 2011: Rekonstruktion CD (remix CD of the Baustelle record)
- 2012: Wildlife CD
- 2012: 500m CD (with Jochen Irmler as Gut Und Irlmler)
- 2016: Vogelmixe – Gudrun Gut Remixes Heimatlieder aus Deutschland Berlin / Augsburg CD / Vinyl
- 2017: Instrumentals For "Sirens" LP (with Beate Bartel)
- 2018: Moment CD / vinyl / digital
- 2024: GUT Soundtrack – Moabit Musik Moa24

=== Filmography ===
- 1988: Dandy – directed by Peter Sempel
- 1995: Girls Bite Back – directed by Wolfgang Büld
- 2005: Verschwende deine Jugend – directed by Benjamin Quabeck
- 2015: B-Movie: Lust & Sound in West-Berlin 1979-1989, documentary with Mark Reeder
- 2024: GUT, minidocuserie – directed by Heiko Lange / Creative Director: Gudrun Gut

=== Radio drama music ===
- 1991: Paul Zech: Das Trunkene Schiff – directed by Wolfgang Rindfleisch (Radio drama – Funkhaus Berlin)

=== Bibliography ===
- Marke B, Berliner Labels. Verbrecher Verlag ed., Berlin 2002. ISBN 3-935843-18-6 (with Thomas Fehlmann and Daniel Meteo).
