= Middendorf =

Middendorf is a surname. Notable people with the surname include:

- J. William Middendorf (1924–2025), U.S. diplomat
- John Middendorf (1959–2024), big wall rock climber
- Tracy Middendorf (born 1970), American television, movie, and stage actress
- Alexander von Middendorff (1815–1894), Russian zoologist and explorer of Baltic-German origin.
