= Monika Enterprise =

- Founded: 1997
- Founder: Gudrun Gut
- Distributor(s): Indigo
- Genre: Independent
- Country of origin: DE
- Location: Berlin
- Official website: Official Web Site of Monika Enterprise

Monika Enterprises is a Berlin, Germany-based independent record label.

In 2001, Wallpaper magazine described the label's musical style as "[o]ccupying a twilight zone between electronic pop, easy listening and bedsit angst" and "[s]pearheading a new generation of, frequently female, electronic introspective sounds". In 2007, Resident Advisor praised it as an "ace leftfield label".

Gudrun Gut has stated that the label was named after a deceased goldfish of hers.

== Artists (selection) ==
- AGF
- Barbara Morgenstern
- Cobra Killer
- Figurine
- Gudrun Gut
- Natalie Beridze
- Quarks

== Compilations ==
- Monika Werkstatt (16 June 17)
- Musik fürs Wohnzimmer
- Santa Monika
- Raumschiff Monika
- Monika Force
- 4 Women No Cry Vol.1
- 4 Women No Cry Vol.2
- 4 Women No Cry Vol.3

== See also ==
- List of record labels
