= Kitty-Yo =

German record label

Kitty-Yo is a German record label. It has specialized since its inception in 1994 in indie electronic music, post-rock and electropop. It was founded in Berlin by Raik Hölzel following the creation of an independent zine of the same name; the label began by publishing music for Surrogat, Patrick Wagner's group project.

Since their inception, Kitty-Yo albums and singles have been distributed worldwide, gaining a college radio following in the United States, with it also gaining the attention of John Peel and Steve Albini. Their first charting record was Kante in 2000, and would later release records by artists such as Taylor Savvy, Peaches, Maximilian Hecker, Couch, Chikinki, The Michelles and Raz Ohara.

== Kitty-Yo artists ==
=== Present ===
- Jimi Tenor
- Spyritual
- The Tape vs. RQM
- Litwinenko
- Gold Chains & Sue Cie
- Rhythm King AHF
- White Hole

=== Past ===
- Surrogat
- Laub
- Peaches
- Gonzales
- Jeans Team
- To Rococo Rot
- Tarwater
- Couch
- Go Plus
- Taylor Savvy
- Wuhling
- Kerosin
- Maximilian Hecker
- MitteKill
- Kante
- Sex in Dallas
- Louie Austen
- Codec & Flexor
- Jahcoozi
- Chikinki
- Rechenzentrum
- Raz Ohara
- Jay Haze

== See also ==
- List of record labels
