= Mistake Mistake Mistake Mistake =

Studio album by James Figurine
- Released: 2006
- Genre: Indietronica
- Label: Plug Research
- Producer: James Figurine

Professional ratings
Review scores
Source	Rating
AllMusic	link
Pitchfork	(5.2/10) link

Mistake Mistake Mistake Mistake is an album by James Figurine, released in 2006 under the Plug Research record label. It includes ten tracks. The album, inspired by the "three or four" techno tapes that Figurine's German label-assigned driver played "over and over again" during their November 2001 tour with Lali Puna, was mixed by John Tejada at Palette Recordings in California and mastered at Calyx Mastering in Berlin. The album's title refers to what Tamborello "kept chanting to the beat while [he] worked on the tracks".

== Track listing ==
1. "55566688833"
2. "Leftovers"
3. "Ruining the Sundays"
4. "Pretend It's a Race and I'm on Your Side"
5. "You Again"
6. "Apologies"
7. "One More Regret"
8. "White Ducks"
9. "All the Way to China"
10. "Stop"

== Personnel ==
- David Figurine - artwork; layout
- Erlend Øye - vocals (9)
- Geoff McFetridge - lyrics (9)
- James Figurine - songwriting (1–10); production (1–10)
- Jenny Lewis - additional vocals (5)
- John Tejada - mixing (1–10); additional arranging (3); additional sounds (3, 4, 7, 9); guitar (9); songwriting (4, 9)
- Morgan Nagler - lyrics (4); vocals (4)
- Sonya Westcott - additional vocals (1)
- Zeitgeist Artist Management, LTD - management
