= Strictly Ballroom (band) =

Emo band from California

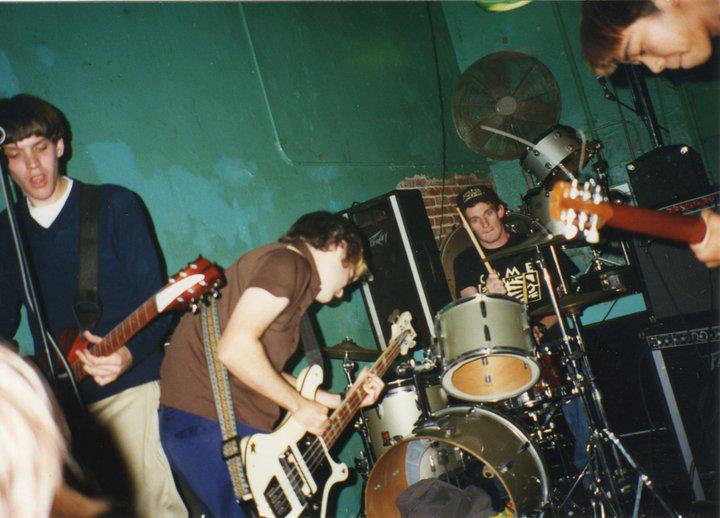
- Strictly Ballroom live at the Jabberjaw in Los Angeles (1995)

Background information
- Also known as: Arca
- Origin: Los Angeles, California
- Genres: Emo; post-rock; screamo
- Years active: 1994-1999; 2001
- Past members: Chris Gunst; Jimmy Tamborello; Paul Larson; Jimi Hey; Chris Hathwell; Brian Tamborello; Ian MacKinnon; Koji Motonishi; Jose Salguero

Strictly Ballroom was a Los Angeles, California underground emo/hardcore punk/indie rock band active between 1994 and 1999.

== History ==
The group was formed in 1994 by Chris Gunst (guitar/vocals) and Jimmy Tamborello (bass/vocals), who met while they were both college radio DJs at KXLU in Los Angeles. The band's sound was described as "Enocore" by the press and some fans at the time, due to their use of Brian Eno-like soundscapes merged with the sounds of hardcore punk rock. Strictly Ballroom was affiliated with the emo hardcore scene of the mid-to-late 1990s and played at known clubs such as Los Angeles' Jabberjaw. Gunst went on to form Beachwood Sparks, and Tamborello went on to form the Postal Service. Both projects subsequently release albums on Sub Pop Records, the latter of which received platinum certification from the Recording Industry Association of America.

According to Tony Kiewel, president of Sub Pop Records, "Strictly Ballroom didn't really get out of California much but they were a fairly influential part of the local music scene while they were around. Suffice to say, there's an odd crew of folks who were all really close and involved in this little scene who all went on to do relatively interesting stuff."

The original line-up included Tamborello's younger brother, Brian Tamborello, on drums. Ian MacKinnon (also a KXLU DJ at the time) later replaced the younger Tamborello. Koji Motonishi joined on guitar in 1995. Motonishi left in 1996, replaced by Paul Larson. Around 1997, Jose Salguero (also a KXLU DJ at the time) joined on turntables, and Jimi Hey joined on drums and keyboards. In 1998, Jimmy LaValle joined on keyboards, and MacKinnon left, replaced by Chris Hathwell. Strictly Ballroom broke up in 1999, but members have continued to collaborate and join or start other musical projects.

== Song usage in other media ==
In 2022, Vans used two Strictly Ballroom songs, “Fire (Remix) (1997)” and “New Angels (1995),” in the Vans snowboarding short film, “It’s Love.” The short film, directed by Tanner Pendleton and parts of which were shot in Iceland, features streetstyle snowboarding.

In 2023, Thrasher Magazine used the Strictly Ballroom song, “New Angels (1995),” in skateboarding video part, “Lad is Pro as,” which features newly turned professional Australian skateboarder, Rowan Davis, in his debut professional video part for Girl Skateboards.

== Members ==
- Chris Gunst - guitar/vocals
- Jimmy Tamborello - bass/vocals
- Brian Tamborello - drums (1994–95)
- Ian MacKinnon - drums (1995–98)
- Koji Motonishi - guitar (1995–96)
- Chris Hathwell - drums (1998–99)
- Paul Larson - guitar (1996–99)
- Jose Salguero - turntables (1996–97)
- Jimi Hey - drums/keyboards (1997–99)
- Jimmy LaValle - keyboards (1998–99)

== Discography ==
=== Albums ===
- Hide Here Forever (1997, Waxploitation)

=== Singles & EPs ===
- Strictly Ballroom (1995, Chou-Chou Records/I Am A Idiot)
- I Love... (1996, I Am A Idiot)
- Devil in the Woods DIW #32 (split with Red House Painters and Sunday's Best, as Arca) (2000, Devil in the Woods)
- Fire/Fire (Remix) (2001, Sub Pop)

=== Compilations ===
- Collected Recordings (1994-1999) (2013, Tenderness)

=== Compilation appearances ===
- "Second Hand Fiasco" on Hand Made Words (1995, Toyland)
- "Instrumental" on KXLU 88.9 FM Los Angeles Live Volume 2 (1996, KXLU)
- "Escape Plan #4" on Zum Audio Vol. 1 (1997, Zum)
- "Untitled" on Soccocore (1997)

== Members' other projects ==
- Chris Gunst - Further, the Tyde, Beachwood Sparks, Mystic Chords of Memory
- Jimmy Tamborello - Dntel, Figurine, the Postal Service, Further
- Brian Tamborello - Psychic Ills, Transitional
- Ian MacKinnon - Beachwood Sparks
- Jimi Hey - Beachwood Sparks, All Night Radio, Haunted Graffiti, Indian Jewelry, the Rapture, Devendra Banhart, Glass Candy
- Chris Hathwell - Moving Units
- Jimmy LaValle - the Album Leaf
