= Stephen Gardner (disambiguation) =

Stephen Gardner may refer to:

- Stephen Gardner (1921-1978), American businessman
- Stephen Gardner (transportation executive) (born 1975), American transportation executive

== See also ==
- Stephen Gardner Champlin (1827-1864), American physician, lawyer, soldier, and judge
- Steve Gardner (disambiguation)
