= Digital Ash in a Digital Urn =

Studio album by Bright Eyes
- Released: January 25, 2005
- Recorded: February 2004
- Studios: Presto! (Lincoln, Nebraska)
- Genres: Electronica; pop; synth-pop; electropop; experimental; IDM
- Length: 50:05
- Label: Saddle Creek
- Producer: Bright Eyes

Bright Eyes chronology
I'm Wide Awake, It's Morning (2005)	Digital Ash in a Digital Urn (2005)	Motion Sickness (2005)

Singles from Digital Ash in a Digital Urn
- 1. "Take It Easy (Love Nothing)" Released: October 26, 2004; 2. "Easy/Lucky/Free" Released: July 25, 2005; 3. "Gold Mine Gutted" Released: 2005

Singles from Digital Ash in a Digital Urn: A Companion
- 1. "Gold Mind Gutted (Companion version)" Released: August 10, 2022

Professional ratings
Aggregate scores
Source	Rating
Metacritic	66/100
Review scores
Source	Rating
AllMusic	2/5 stars
Blender	3/5 stars
Entertainment Weekly	B−
Los Angeles Times	3.5/4 stars
NME	9/10
Pitchfork	7.2/10
Q	2/5 stars
Rolling Stone	3/5 stars
Spin	C+
Uncut	4/5 stars

Digital Ash in a Digital Urn is the seventh studio album by American band Bright Eyes, released on January 25, 2005, by Saddle Creek Records, the same day as their sixth album I'm Wide Awake, It's Morning. It peaked at number 15 in the US and 43 in the UK. In US it has sold 268,000 units. In 2007 it was awarded a gold certification from the Independent Music Companies Association, which indicated sales of at least 100,000 copies throughout Europe. In contrast to the acoustic nature of I'm Wide Awake, It's Morning, the Digital Ash in a Digital Urn album is more electronic.

Upon release in 2004, the singles "Take It Easy (Love Nothing)" from Digital Ash in a Digital Urn and "Lua" from the album I'm Wide Awake, It's Morning debuted in the top two slots on the Billboard Hot 100 Single Sales chart.

The album was reissued by Dead Oceans alongside a six-track companion EP on November 11, 2022.

== Tour ==
After the chart success of the 2004 singles "Lua" and "Take It Easy (Love Nothing)", the band set off in 2005 on a two-part world tour to promote both I'm Wide Awake, It's Morning, and Digital Ash in a Digital Urn. The first half of the tour promoted the folk-influenced first album, and the latter half featured the more electronic second album. Both records made it into the Top 20 of the Billboard album charts. The tour was captured on Motion Sickness, released later in the year.

The album features contributions from the Yeah Yeah Yeahs' Nick Zinner and the Postal Service's Jimmy Tamborello.

== Track listing ==
No.	Title	Length
1.	"Time Code"	4:28
2.	"Gold Mine Gutted"	3:56
3.	"Arc of Time (Time Code)"	3:54
4.	"Down in a Rabbit Hole"	4:34
5.	"Take It Easy (Love Nothing)"	3:20
6.	"Hit the Switch"	4:47
7.	"I Believe in Symmetry"	5:24
8.	"Devil in the Details"	4:06
9.	"Ship in a Bottle"	3:27
10.	"Light Pollution"	3:16
11.	"Theme from Piñata"	3:18
12.	"Easy/Lucky/Free"	5:30
Total length:		50:05

Digital Ash in a Digital Urn: A Companion
No.	Title	Length
1.	"Hit the Switch" (companion version)
2.	"Down in a Rabbit Hole" (companion version)
3.	"Arc of Time (Time Code)" (companion version) (featuring Michaela Favara)
4.	"Ship in a Bottle" (companion version) (featuring A. J. Mogis)
5.	"Agenda Suicide" (The Faint)
6.	"Gold Mine Gutted" (companion version) (featuring Michaela Favara)

== Personnel ==
- Clark Baechle – drums (tracks 2, 9)
- Karen Becker – cello (tracks 4, 7)
- Jason Boesel – drums (tracks 2, 4–7, 9–12), percussion (tracks 2, 4–7, 9–12)
- Donna Carnes – violin (tracks 4, 7)
- Digital Audio Engine (Mike Mogis) – programming (tracks 1, 3, 8)
- Sabrina Duim – harp (tracks 6, 8, 11)
- Thomas Kluge – viola (tracks 4, 7)
- Jiha Lee – flute (tracks 6, 11)
- Clay Leverett – voice (track 12), drums (tracks 6, 7, 12)
- Andy LeMaster – vocals (tracks 2, 9, 12), guitar (tracks 6–9, 12), bass (tracks 6–9, 12), keyboards (tracks 6, 7), additional programming (tracks 6)
- Mike Mogis – guitar (tracks 2–4, 6, 7, 10–12), wurlitzer (tracks 1, 3, 10), keyboards, timpani (track 6), chimes (track 11), theremin (track 2), baritone (tracks 2, 9)
- Stella Mogis – voice (tracks 1, 9)
- Conor Oberst – vocals, guitar (tracks 5–7, 9–11), bass (track 4), piano (track 8), wurlitzer (tracks 2, 4, 5), keyboards (tracks 2, 4, 10, 12), samples (tracks 1, 11), baritone (tracks 3, 5)
- Kim Salistean – violin (tracks 4, 7)
- Jimmy Tamborello – programming (track 5)
- Maria Taylor – vocals (tracks 4, 11, 12)
- Nate Walcott – trumpet (track 9), string arrangement (tracks 4, 7)
- Nick White – keyboards (tracks 7, 9)
- Nick Zinner – guitar (tracks 4, 6–8, 12), keyboards (tracks 4, 5)

== Charts ==
Chart performance
Chart (2005)	Peak position
Australian Albums (ARIA)	130
Austrian Albums (Ö3 Austria)	49
Belgian Albums (Ultratop Flanders)	64
Belgian Alternative Albums (Ultratop Flanders)	35
Canadian Albums (Nielsen SoundScan)	124
Dutch Albums (Album Top 100)	95
Dutch Alternative Albums (Alternative Top 30)	5
European Albums (Billboard)	52
German Albums (Offizielle Top 100)	30
Irish Albums (IRMA)	50
Norwegian Albums (VG-lista)	32
Scottish Albums (Official Charts)	34
Swedish Albums (Sverigetopplistan)	18
UK Albums (Official Charts)	43
UK Independent Albums (Official Charts)	5
US Billboard 200	15
US Independent Albums (Billboard)	3
