= Mia Doi Todd =

American singer-songwriter

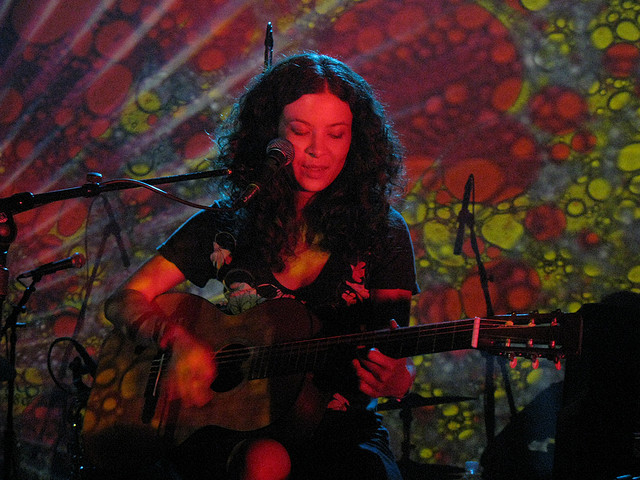
- Todd performing in 2008

Background information
- Born: June 30, 1975 (age 51)
- Origin: Los Angeles, California, United States
- Genre: Indie folk
- Occupation: Singer-songwriter
- Years active: 1997–present
- Labels: Xmas Records, Communion, Columbia/SME Records, Plug Research, City Zen Records
- Website: miadoitodd.com

Mia Doi Todd (Japanese: 土井 美亜, born June 30, 1975) is an American singer-songwriter. She was described by Dusted Magazine as "one of those artists that seem to function not just as creators in their own right, but as connecting links between other musicians."

== Early life ==
Mia Doi Todd was born June 30, 1975, in Los Angeles, California. Her father is sculptor Michael Todd and her mother is retired judge Kathryn Doi Todd.

== Career ==
Todd started City Zen Records and released Zeroone, the follow-up album to Come Out of Your Mine, on the label in 2001.

She signed a contract with Columbia/SME Records and recorded The Golden State, culling songs from her previous albums. Mitchell Froom helped her produce it, and the album came out in 2002.

She released the fifth album, Manzanita, on Plug Research in 2005. Her debut album, The Ewe and the Eye, originally released in 1997, was reissued later that year.

Her 2006 compilation album, La Ninja: Amor and Other Dreams of Manzanita, included remixes from Dntel and Flying Lotus. It was followed by her studio album, Gea, in 2008.

In 2009, she released her first instrumental album, Morning Music, in collaboration with Andres Renteria.

She returned with the solo album, Cosmic Ocean Ship, in 2011. In 2014, she released Floresta on City Zen Records.

Take What You Can Carry (Scientist Dub One) is a song about the World War II Internment of Japanese Americans camp experience which affected her mother and grandmother. It was released on February 20, 2020, when California lawmakers passed a resolution to formally apologize to Japanese-Americans for the Legislature's role in their incarceration.

She is married to Jesse Peterson and has a daughter.

== Discography ==
=== Studio albums ===
- The Ewe and the Eye (1997)
- Come Out of Your Mine (1999)
- Zeroone (2001)
- The Golden State (2002)
- Manzanita (2005)
- Gea (2008)
- Morning Music (2009) (with Andres Renteria)
- Cosmic Ocean Ship (2011)
- Floresta (2014)
- Songbook (2016)
- Music Life (2021)

=== Soundtracks ===
- Music for A Midsummer Night's Dream (2018)

=== Remix albums ===
- La Ninja: Amor and Other Dreams of Manzanita (2006)
- Ten Views of Music Life (2021)

=== EPs ===
- Pink Sun EP (2006)

=== Singles ===
- "Dublab Remixes" (2003)
- "Sleepless Nights" (2008)
- "Take What You Can Carry (Scientist Dub One)" (2020)

=== Guest appearances ===
- The Folk Implosion - "Chained to the Moon" from One Part Lullaby (1999)
- Mission - "Home" (2001)
- Dntel - "Anywhere Anyone" from Life Is Full of Possibilities (2001)
- Beachwood Sparks - "Ponce de Leon Blues" from Make the Cowboy Robots Cry (2002)
- David J - "Good to Be Loved" from Mess Up (2002)
- Adventure Time - "Sent from Sandy Shores" from Dreams of Water Themes (2003)
- Saul Williams - "Seaweed" from Saul Williams (2004)
- Nobody - "You Can Know Her" from And Everything Else... (2005)
- Thavius Beck - "Down" from Thru (2006)
- Ammoncontact - "Earth's Children" from With Voices (2006)
- Savath & Savalas - "Intro" from Golden Pollen (2007)
- Life on Earth - Look!! There Is Life on Earth! (2007)
- Dntel - "Rock My Boat" from Dumb Luck (2007)
- Kraig Grady - Beyond the Windows Perhaps Among the Podcorn (2007)
- Build an Ark - Love, Pt. 1 (2009)
- Build an Ark - "Say Yes!" from Love, Pt. 2 (2010)
- Build an Ark - "The Yes Song" from The Stars Are Singing Too (2011)
- Turn on the Sunlight - New Day (2013)
- André 3000 - "Ghandi, Dalai Lama, Your Lord & Savior J.C. / Bundy, Jeffrey Dahmer, and John Wayne Gacy" and "Ants to You, Gods to Who?" from New Blue Sun (2023)

=== Compilation appearances ===
- "La Vie en Rose" from The Unaccompanied Voice: An A Capella Compilation (2000)
- "Digital, Version 2.1" from Dublab Presents: Freeways (2001)
- "Ready or Not" from Loving Takes This Course: A Tribute to the Songs of Kath Bloom (2009)
- "Night of a Thousand Kisses" from Transmissions from Sinai (2009)
- "Um Girassol da Cor do Seu Cabelo" and "Canto de Iemanjá" from Red Hot + Rio 2 (2011)
- "Jardim do Amor" from Red Hot + Bach (2014)
- "Spring" from Mood Indigo: Original Motion Picture Soundtrack (2014)
