= Strictly Ballroom (disambiguation) =

Strictly Ballroom is a 1992 Australian romantic comedy film directed aby Baz Luhrmann.

Strictly Ballroom may also refer to:

- Strictly Ballroom (soundtrack), the soundtrack to the 1992 film
- Strictly Ballroom (musical), a 2014 musical theatre adaptation of the 1992 film
- Strictly Ballroom (band), a Los Angeles, California band
- Strictly Ballroom (Even Stevens), a 2001 episode of the TV series Even Stevens
