= Bears3 =

Series of short animated films created by Matt Everitt and Matt Clark

Bears3 are a series of short animated films created by Matt Everitt and Matt Clark. The films feature 3 teddy bears animated to dialogue taken from The Ricky Gervais Show an Xfm radio show featuring Ricky Gervais, Steve Merchant and Karl Pilkington. Additional original dialogue was recorded by the trio for the episode Y-Fronts and the films went on to feature on both Ricky's and Xfm's website.

Seven episodes were made:

- Foreigners
- Y-Fronts
- SMBU
- Rock
- Stitch in Time
- Educate me
- Mittens

The character's popularity has grown since first appearing on Ricky's Website in 2005, and have gone on to feature in the Onedotzero international film festival, Pictoplasma's Characters In Motion book and DVD, and in The Office episode of BBC1's Comedy Connections TV show.

== Controversy ==
Recently the creators of Bears3 have claimed that television advertisements for the Irish National Lottery have striking similarities to Bears3. In an article in the Irish Metro Matt Clark says he was "shocked and taken aback" at the similarities in between the lottery ads and Bears3. Cathal Gaffney speaking on behalf of Brown Bag Films, the animation company who worked on the lottery ads, suggest that Bears3 are "obscure" and hadn't been broadcast.
