= Chessie =

Chessie may refer to:

- Chessie (sea monster), a legendary monster supposedly living in Chesapeake Bay, US
- Chessie System, a former holding company of the Chesapeake and Ohio Railway (C&O)
- Chessie (mascot), a kitten mascot of the C&O
- Chessie (train), a proposed streamlined passenger train of the C&O
- Chessie (band), an American experimental music group started in 1993
- Chesapeake Bay Retriever, a breed of dog
