= Across the River of Stars =

Studio album by Beachwood Sparks
- Released: July 19, 2024
- Genre: Country rock
- Length: 28:10
- Label: Curation
- Producer: Chris Robinson

Beachwood Sparks chronology
The Tarnished Gold (2012)	Across the River of Stars (2024)

Across the River of Stars is the fourth studio album by American alt-country band Beachwood Sparks, released on July 19, 2024, through Curation Records. It marks their first album of new material in 12 years, following The Tarnished Gold (2012). The album received positive reviews from critics.

== Critical reception ==
Professional ratings
Aggregate scores
Source	Rating
Metacritic	83/100
Review scores
Source	Rating
AllMusic	4.5/5 stars
Mojo	4/5 stars
Paste	7.3/10
Uncut	7/10

Across the River of Stars received a score of 83 out of 100 on review aggregator Metacritic based on six critics' reviews, which the website categorized as "universal acclaim". Mojo described it as "a succinct record about wisdom accrued through adversity, its layered arrangements packing subtle psych tropes and world-weary vocal-harmony". Uncut felt that "the core trio of Chris Gunst, Brent Rademaker and Farmer Dave Scher, plus various friends, excel on the breezy optimism of 'Falling Forever', while the mellow vibes of 'Faded Glory' recall Teenage Fanclub at their sunniest".

Matt Collar of AllMusic wrote that the album "finds the California group embracing the psychedelic '70s country-rock of their early work with an added sonic shimmer" and producer Chris Robinson "brings his own passion for rootsy, kaleidoscope-eyed rock", which results in "a glow that beckons to you, pulling you closer". Paste's Eric R. Danton stated that the "cosmic Americana leanings are in full effect right from the start" and the band are "good at what they do, and the long intervals between albums makes it easy to welcome them back". Glide Magazine summarized that the band "hit the cosmic canyon touchpoints and beyond on their short but sweet return".

== Track listing ==
All tracks are written by Christopher Lee Gunst, Brent Rademaker, and David Scher.

Across the River of Stars track listing
No.	Title	Length
1.	"My Love, My Love"	3:39
2.	"Torn in Two"	3:15
3.	"Falling Forever"	3:34
4.	"Gentle Samurai"	3:48
5.	"Gem"	3:54
6.	"Faded Glory"	2:47
7.	"Dolphin Dance"	2:25
8.	"High Noon"	2:42
9.	"Wild Swans"	2:06
Total length:		28:10

== Personnel ==
Beachwood Sparks

- Christopher Gunst
- Jen Gunst
- Ben Knight
- Brent Rademaker
- Andres Renteria
- Dave Scher

Additional contributors

- Chris Robinson – production
- JJ Golden – mastering
- Paul Stacey – mixing
- Eric Bauer – engineering
- Taylor Rushing – cover art
- Christopher Appelgren – design
