= Aimlessness =

Aimlessness may refer to:

- Aimlessness (album), an album by Dntel released on June 1, 2012
- Aimlessness (Buddhism), or apraṇihita or uncommittedness or wishlessness (Sanskritapraṇihita अप्रणिहित), a form of "concentration" in some schools of Buddhist meditation
- Aimless wandering, refers to both samsara (the Buddhist cycle of birth, death, and rebirth) and a mindfulness practice of exploration without destination that often takes the form of a walking meditation (although it does not require movement)
