= Manzanita (Mia Doi Todd album) =

Studio album by Mia Doi Todd
- Released: February 8, 2005
- Genres: Indie rock, folk
- Length: 38:38
- Label: Plug Research
- Producers: Mia Doi Todd, Brent Rademaker, Rob Campanella

Mia Doi Todd chronology
The Golden State (2002)	Manzanita (2005)	La Ninja: Amor and Other Dreams of Manzanita (2006)

Professional ratings
Aggregate scores
Source	Rating
Metacritic	71/100
Review scores
Source	Rating
AllMusic	4/5 stars
The A.V. Club	favorable
Pitchfork	6.9/10

Manzanita is a studio album by Mia Doi Todd. It was released on Plug Research on February 8, 2005.

== Reception ==
At Metacritic, which assigns a weighted average score out of 100 to reviews from mainstream critics, Manzanita received an average score of 71% based on 12 reviews, indicating "generally favorable reviews".

== Track listing ==
No.	Title	Length
1.	"The Way"	5:16
2.	"What If We Do?"	3:37
3.	"My Room Is White"	4:16
4.	"The Last Night of Winter"	6:39
5.	"Muscle, Bone & Blood"	3:56
6.	"Casa Nova"	3:02
7.	"Luna Lune"	3:06
8.	"Tongue-Tied"	2:07
9.	"Deep at Sea"	3:34
10.	"I Gave You My Home"	3:05
