= Dntel =

American electronic musician and DJ

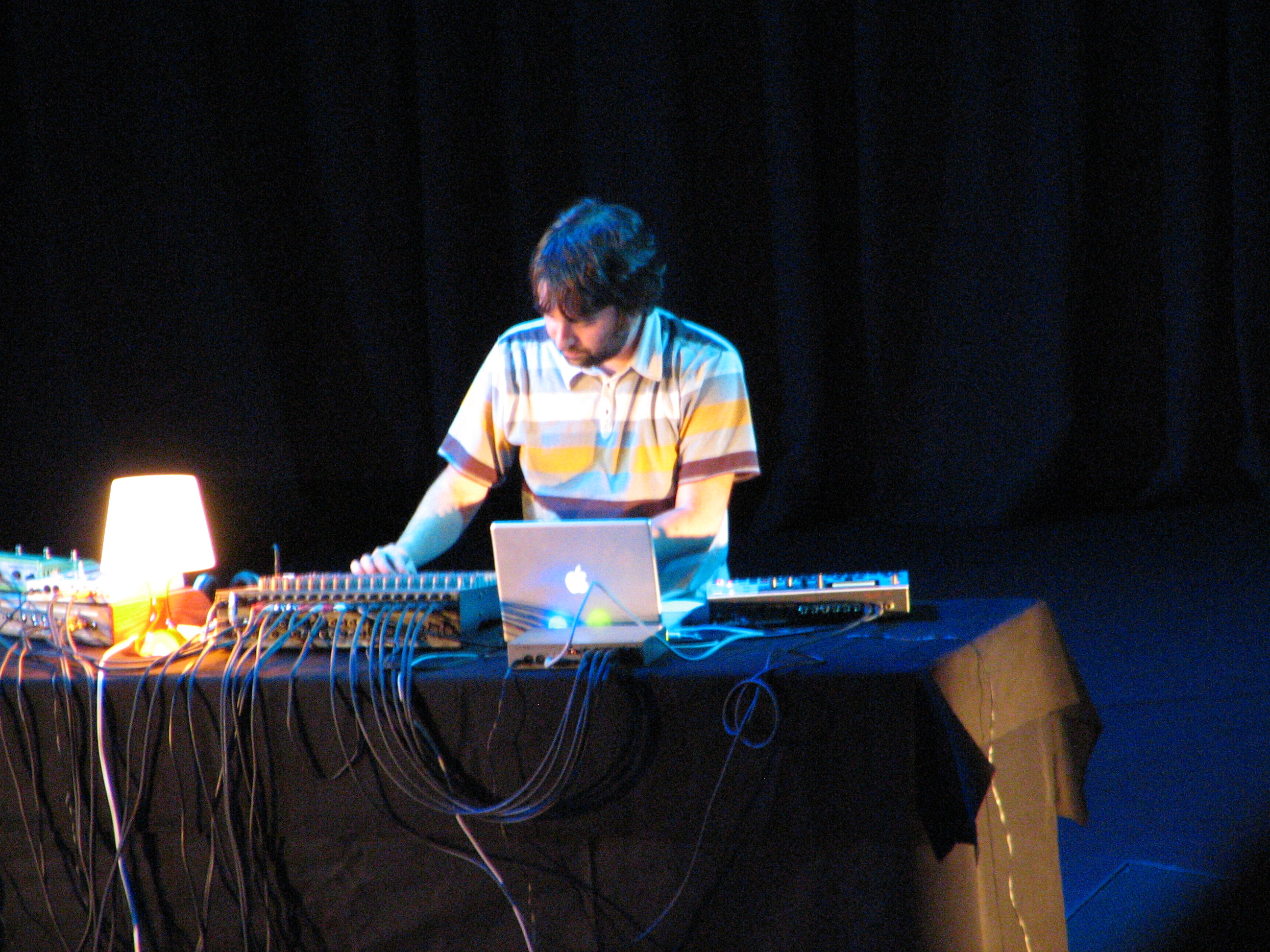
- Dntel in 2006

Background information
- Also known as: James Figurine; Jimmy Tamborello
- Born: James Scott Tamborello; 1975 (age 50–51)
- Genres: Glitch, downtempo, indietronica, IDM, folktronica
- Years active: 1989–present
- Labels: Plug Research, Sub Pop
- Member of: Figurine
- Formerly of: The Postal Service, Strictly Ballroom

James Scott Tamborello (born 1975), also known by his stage name Dntel /ˈdɪntɛl/, is an American electronic music artist and DJ. Aside from his main solo project, Tamborello is also known as a member of the groups The Postal Service, Headset, Strictly Ballroom, and Figurine, where he sometimes uses the alias James Figurine.

== Personal life ==
Tamborello's father was a jazz saxophone player, flautist, and a songwriter for many Santa Barbara, California-based bands. His mother, Joyce Menges was an actress who starred in the sitcom To Rome with Love starring John Forsythe, Kay Medford, and Melanie Fullerton, in 1969, and later in the Walt Disney Productions film Now You See Him Now You Don't, starring Kurt Russell, in 1972.

== Musical career and Dntel ==
Tamborello first began creating music in 1989, when he was in junior high school in Santa Barbara. His father bought him a drum machine, a sequencer, a keyboard and an eight track recorder, primarily for the possibility to create music on his own. Tamborello recorded an album under the name Antihouse in 1993, which was released the following year, then beginning work on the first Dntel EP. During these years, Tamborello attended Loyola Marymount University where he was a DJ and music director at KXLU. He engineered on several albums recorded at the station including "KXLU LIVE: Volume 1," for which he also designed the album artwork. Tamborello was also the bass player for a band known as Strictly Ballroom. The band was often described as "Enocore," as Brian Eno soundscapes were an important influence in their music. Strictly Ballroom recorded one album, Hide Here Forever, which was released in 1997 on the Waxploitation Records label. They released a single in 1995 titled "Dear XXX" on the Chou Chou records label.

A collection of the demos during the period of 1995 to 1997 was released as Early Works for Me If It Works for You, in 1998, and work from the first Dntel EP was released as Something Always Goes Wrong, in 2000, both on the Phthalo label. As a pioneer of contemporary glitch and electronica, Dntel gained a cult following. After writing a track for the Voices in My Lunchbox collaboration for the Plug Research label, he was asked to work with them. Tamborello released a 12-inch LP, Anywhere Anyone, in 2000.

Tamborello released the debut Dntel full-length album, Life Is Full of Possibilities, in 2001. The album featured several guest artists on vocals and instruments, including Ben Gibbard of Death Cab for Cutie, Mia Doi Todd, fellow Figurine member Meredith Figurine, Chris Gunst of Beachwood Sparks, Brian McMahan of Slint, The For Carnation, and Rachel Haden of that dog. The track "(This Is) The Dream of Evan and Chan" from the album was very well-received, which led to the song being released in 2002 as the only single from Life Is Full of Possibilities. A remix of the song by Superpitcher was voted the 17th best dance track of the decade by a Resident Advisor poll in 2010.

On April 24, 2007, Tamborello released his third album Dumb Luck on Subpop Records to generally positive critical reception. This, coinciding with Death Cab For Cutie's release, Narrow Stairs moved any future plans of The Postal Service recording past the end of the decade. Tamborello released a surprise new album called Hate In My Heart on August 2, 2018, through Leaving Records.

== Figurine ==
Since 1994, Tamborello has also been a member of the electropop band Figurine. Consisting of Tamborello (as James Figurine), Meredith Figurine, and David Figurine, the trio were high school friends and created music based mostly on the theme of long-distance love, releasing their debut album, Transportation + Communication = Love, in 1999. The group released their second album, The Heartfelt, in 2001, and a remix album, Reconfigurine, in 2002.

Tamborello released a solo album under the name James Figurine, Mistake Mistake Mistake Mistake, in 2006, featuring a downtempo electronica style.

== The Postal Service ==
The success of the collaboration between Tamborello and Ben Gibbard on the song "(This Is) The Dream of Evan and Chan" from Life Is Full of Possibilities, which features lyrics and vocals from Gibbard, led the two to form their own side-project The Postal Service in 2001. The duo released their debut album, Give Up, in 2003 on Sub Pop Records, receiving very positive reviews from critics and eventual platinum certification from the Recording Industry of America. The album spawned the successful singles "Such Great Heights", "The District Sleeps Alone Tonight", and "We Will Become Silhouettes". Along with additional member Jenny Lewis, who performed vocals on the album, the group toured in support of Give Up despite their main projects also being active at the time.

The Postal Service became largely inactive after 2005, until 2013 when the group reunited for a tour to celebrate the tenth anniversary of Give Up. However, on August 3, 2013, Ben Gibbard announced via Twitter that The Postal Service would permanently disband after the tour.

On December 9, 2009, Rolling Stone named the song "Such Great Heights" the 27th best song of the decade.

In December 2022, the group announced a 2023 tour co-headlining with Death Cab for Cutie to celebrate the twentieth anniversaries of Give Up and Transatlanticism.

== Other projects ==
Tamborello is also the host of a regular music show called Dying Songs heard on the internet radio station Dublab. In 2004, Tamborello was credited for programming on the song "Take It Easy (Love Nothing)" by Bright Eyes, which reached number two on the Billboard US Singles Chart.

As Headset he collaborated with Plug Research record label owner Allen Avanessian and a number of guest rappers on the 2004 album Space Settings.

== Equipment ==
Tamborello uses a large variety of electronic equipment to create his sound. He uses Logic Pro for programming, a Rode k2 microphone for vocals, and Dynaudio Air series speakers. His studio has a glockenspiel, Avalon Design VT-747sp compressor, MicroKorg, Elektron Machinedrum, Vostok Matrixsynth, Elektron Monomachine, Vermona Retroverb, Empirical Labs EL8X Distressor Compressor, MOTU MIDI Timepiece, Vermona DRM1 MKII (drum machine), Dave Smith Poly Evolver Rack, Minimoog Voyager, two Motu 828 MKII, Mackie 1604 mixer, Kurzweil K2000 synthesizer, Jomox Xbase 999, Moogerfooger MF-104Z Analog Delay, DigiTech IPS33 Smartshift Intelligent Pitch Shifter, Nord Modular G1, an Omnichord, accordions, jingle bells, Line 6 Delay, and an M-Audio Radium MIDI controller.

== Discography ==
=== Studio albums ===
- 2001 – Life Is Full of Possibilities (Plug Research)
- 2006 – Mistake Mistake Mistake Mistake (Plug Research) (as James Figurine)
- 2007 – Dumb Luck (Sub Pop)
- 2012 – Aimlessness (Pampa)
- 2014 – Human Voice (Leaving Records)
- 2018 – Hate in My Heart (Leaving Records)
- 2021 – The Seas Trees See (Morr Music)
- 2021 – Away (Morr Music)
- 2021 – In Media Res (Palette Recordings) (with John Tejada)

=== Compilation albums ===
- 1998 – Early Works for Me If It Works for You (Phthalo)^{[1]}
- 2001 – Something Always Goes Wrong (Phthalo)^{[2]}
- 2009 – Early Works For Me If It Works For You II (Phthalo)^{[3]}

=== EPs ===
- 2001 – Anywhere Anyone (Plug Research)
- 2002 – (This Is) The Dream of Evan and Chan (Plug Research)
- 2010 – Early Works, Later Versions (Phthalo)
- 2010 – After Parties 1 (Sub Pop)
- 2010 – After Parties 2 (Sub Pop)
- 2014 – Human Voice Outtakes (Leaving Records)
- 2021 – Futureangelics (Cached Media) (with Brin and More Eaze)

=== Singles ===
- 2001 – "Season" (Vynalogica)
- 2002 – Styrofoam / Dntel Split (Rocket Racer)
- 2006 – Jukebox Series #10 (AIM Records)
- 2006 – Eleven Numbers (Monika Enterprise) (as James Figurine)
- 2006 – Forgive Your Friends (Monika Enterprise) (as James Figurine)
- 2007 – Covers (Plug Research) (as James Figurine)
- 2007 – "The Distance" (Moshi Moshi)
- 2008 – "Dreams" – Lawrence Remixes (Deal)
- 2011 – "Jitters" / "Swells" (Edit) (Dying Songs)
- 2012 – Dntel – The Robag Wruhme Remixes (Pampa)

=== Other appearances ===
- Beachwood Sparks – Make the Cowboy Robots Cry (2002 · Sub Pop)
- Giardini Di Mirò – Little Victories (Dntel Remix) (2002 · 2nd rec)
- Barbara Morgenstern – Aus heiterem Himmel (Dntel Remix) (2003 · Monika Enterprise)
- Bright Eyes – Take It Easy (Love Nothing) (2004 · Saddle Creek)
- Rilo Kiley – Accidntel Deth (2004 · Brute/Beaute Records)
- Bright Eyes – Digital Ash in a Digital Urn (2005 · Saddle Creek)
- Grizzly Bear – Merge (Dntel Remix) (2005 · Kanine Records)
- Mia Doi Todd – Deep at Sea (Dntel Remix) (2006 · City Zen Records)
- Nobody & Mystic Chords of Memory – Feet Upon the Sand (Dntel Remix) (2006 · Mush)
- Gudrun Gut – The Wheel (Dntel Remix) (2007 · Monika Enterprise)
- Idiot Pilot – Cruel World Enterprise (Dntel Remix) (2007 · Reprise Records/WEA)
- Why? – By Torpedo or Crohn's (Dntel Remix) (2008 · Anticon)
- Free Moral Agents – Sound At Sea (Dntel Remix) (2010 · Gold Standard Labs)
- dné – Like Physical (Dntel Remix) (2012)
- Death Cab for Cutie - Summer Years (Jimmy Tamberello Remix) (2018)
- Mia Doi Todd – Little Bird (Dntel Remix) (2021 · City Zen Records)

Notes

1. First edition released on 250 CD-Rs, later re-issued by Phthalo Records
2. Contains material recorded between 1994 and 2000
3. Reissue of Early Works for Me If It Works for You, Something Always Goes Wrong plus additional material recorded between 1999 and 2003

== See also ==
- List of ambient music artists
