= Conduit =

Conduit may refer to:

== Engineering systems ==
- Conduit (fluid conveyance), a pipe suitable for carrying either open-channel or pressurized liquids
- Electrical conduit, a protective cover, tube or piping system for electric cables
- Conduit current collection, a system of ground-level power supply
- Duct (flow), for heating, ventilating and air-conditioning

== Business ==
- Conduit (finance) or asset-backed commercial paper program, a type of non-bank financial institution
- Conduit and Sink OFCs, a classification of offshore financial centres/tax havens

== Computers and Internet ==
- Conduit (company), an international software company
  - Conduit toolbar a defunct web publishing platform by Conduit
- Conduit (software), an open-source synchronization program for GNOME

== Arts and entertainment ==
- Conduit (Coby Sey album), by Coby Sey, 2022
- Conduit (Funeral for a Friend album), by Funeral for a Friend, 2013
- The Conduit (album), by Jarboe, 2005
- Conduit (character), a DC Comics supervillain
- Conduit (convention), an annual science fiction convention in Salt Lake City, Utah, US
- Conduit (mural), a public artwork by Emily Ginsburg in Portland, Oregon, US
- "Conduit" (The X-Files), a television episode
- The Conduit, a 2009 video game for the Wii console
- The Conduit, a fictional artifact in the video game Mass Effect
- Conduits, superhuman beings in the video game series Infamous
- Conduit (journal), a literary magazine

== Other uses ==
- Conduit (channeling), a means of contact with the spiritual realm
- Conduit (horse) (2005–2020), a Thoroughbred racehorse
- Conduit Road, a road in Hong Kong

== See also ==
- Channel (geography), a type of landform
- Gap junction, an intercellular conduit in molecular cell biology
- Membrane nanotube, another type of intercellular conduit
- Conveyance (disambiguation)
