= Roommate (disambiguation) =

A roommate is a person who shares living quarters.

Roommate(s) may also refer to:

== Film ==
- Roommate (2013 film), Japanese psychological horror
- Roommates (1961 film), also known as Raising the Wind, 1961 British comedy
- Roommates (1995 film), American comedy
- Roommates (2006 Indian film), comedy suspense thriller
- Roommates (2006 South Korean film), horror directed by Kim Eun-kyeong
- Roommates (2026 film), American comedy
- The Roommate, 2011 American psychological thriller

== Music ==
- "Roommates" (Hilary Duff song), 2026
- "Roommates" (Malcolm Todd song), 2023
- "Roommates", 2020 song by Dixie D'Amelio

== Television ==
- Roommate (TV series), 2014 South Korean reality TV series
- Roommates (TV series), 1995 American sitcom

== Other uses ==
- Roommate (band), American rock band
- Roommates (web series), MySpace dramedy active from 2007—2008
- Roommates, 2014 dating simulator video game by Celso Riva
