= Conveyor (disambiguation) =

A conveyor system transports materials from one place to another.

Conveyor may also refer to:

- Conveyor (sternwheeler)
- Conveyor (band), an American art rock band
- Conveyor belt
  - Conveyor belt ski lift
  - Conveyor belt sushi
- Chain conveyor
- Lineshaft roller conveyor
- "Conveyor", a 2015 song by AKB48 from Koko ga Rhodes da, Koko de Tobe!
- "Conveyor", a 2020 song by Moses Sumney from Græ

== See also ==
- Conveyance (disambiguation)
