= Jeremy Dower =

Australian musician & artist (born 1976)

- Speaking at Pictoplasma, Berlin, 2011
- Born: 1976 (age 49–50); Bendigo, Australia
- Occupation: Musician
- Website: https://nakamichi-600ii.bandcamp.com/releases

Jeremy Dower (born 1976) is an Australia-born musician and visual artist. He is best known for contributing the soundtrack to the pixel art tribute to the iconic opening reel of The Simpsons in 2014. The video was created with fellow Aussie animators Paul Robertson and Ivan Dixon. Dower had contributed the arcade-like remake of the theme song to the video.

His work in the visual arts was featured in the 2011 Pictoplasma Festival in Berlin. His best known work in electronic music is "Sentimental Dance Music For Couples", a double album released on Plug Research in 2000. Dower's work in combining visual arts with music has also been featured in Musikgraphics.

Dower has been a guest lecturer at the Royal Melbourne Institute of Technology's School of Media and Communications since 2015, and a current lecturer of Professional Practice in Bachelor of Design (Digital Media).
