= Figurine (disambiguation) =

A figurine is a small statuette that represents a human, deity or animal.

Figurine or Figurines may also refer to:

- Figurine (band), American electronica band
- Figurines (band), Danish indie rock band
- The Figurine, a 2009 thriller film produced and directed by Kunle Afolayan
