= I'm Wide Awake, It's Morning =

2005 studio album by Bright Eyes

Studio album by Bright Eyes
- Released: January 25, 2005
- Recorded: February 2004
- Studios: Presto! (Lincoln, Nebraska)
- Genres: Folk; indie folk; folk rock; alternative country
- Length: 45:41
- Label: Saddle Creek
- Producer: Mike Mogis

Bright Eyes chronology
One Jug of Wine, Two Vessels (2004)	I'm Wide Awake, It's Morning (2005)	Digital Ash in a Digital Urn (2005)

Singles from I'm Wide Awake, It's Morning
- 1. "Lua" Released: October 26, 2004; 2. "First Day Of My Life" Released: March 21, 2005

Singles from I'm Wide Awake, It's Morning: A Companion
- 1. "Old Soul Song (For the New World Order) (Companion version)" Released: August 10, 2022

I'm Wide Awake, It's Morning is the sixth studio album by American band Bright Eyes, released on January 25, 2005, by Saddle Creek Records (the same day as their seventh album, Digital Ash in a Digital Urn).

The album was reissued by Dead Oceans alongside a six-track companion EP on November 11, 2022.

== Songs ==
The music video for "First Day of My Life" was directed by John Cameron Mitchell.

This was the first Bright Eyes album to feature Nate Walcott, who is now a permanent member of the band.

"Road to Joy" contains an interpolation of Beethoven's "Ode to Joy". The title of the album is taken from a lyric in this song.

Bright Eyes achieved success on the US charts when the singles "Lua" and "Take It Easy (Love Nothing)" (the latter from Digital Ash) took the top two positions on the Billboard Hot Singles Sales chart in 2004. In 2005, the band set off on a two-part world tour to promote the album along with Digital Ash in a Digital Urn, with the first half of the tour centring on the folk-influenced first album, and the latter half featuring the more electronic second album. Both records made it into the top 20 of the Billboard albums charts, with I'm Wide Awake, It's Morning peaking at number 10 on the Billboard 200 and at number 2 on the Billboard Independent Albums chart. The tour was captured on the album Motion Sickness, released later in the year.

== Critical reception ==
Professional ratings
Aggregate scores
Source	Rating
Metacritic	85/100
Review scores
Source	Rating
AllMusic	2/5 stars
Blender	4/5 stars
Entertainment Weekly	B
Los Angeles Times	4/4 stars
NME	8/10
Pitchfork	8.7/10
Q	5/5 stars
Rolling Stone	4/5 stars
Spin	A−
The Village Voice	A−

I'm Wide Awake, It's Morning received widespread acclaim from music critics. At Metacritic, the album received an average score of 85 out of 100, based on 33 reviews, which indicates "universal acclaim". Los Angeles Times describes it as "An album with the simmering glow of a masterpiece." Drowned in Sound critic Sean Adams called the album a "thing of awe", praising the lyrics and "calculated attention to detail". Pitchfork's Chris Dahlen gave the album 8.7 out of 10 and states "I'm Wide Awake weaves the personal and the political more fluidly than most singers even care to try, and the consummate tunefulness just strengthens those moments where he pinches a nerve."

In a less positive review, Stephen Thomas Erlewine of AllMusic criticized Oberst's "heavy-handed pretension in the words and [...] affectedness in his delivery", calling the album proof that "instead of reaching musical maturity, he's wallowing in a perpetual adolescence."

Up to 2014, the album had sold 522,000 copies in US. In 2007 it was awarded a gold certification from the Independent Music Companies Association, which indicated sales of at least 100,000 copies throughout Europe.

=== Year-end rankings ===
The album was ranked on several lists for best albums released during the year 2005.

Critic/publication	Rank
Amazon.com Editor's Picks	79
Blender	4
Metacritic	17
Planet Sound	1
Q	5
Rolling Stone	8
Spin	21
Time	10
All Songs Considered	2

It was also ranked at number 50 on Rolling Stone list of "Top 100 Albums of the Decade" and at number 31 on NME's "Top 100 Greatest Albums of the Decade".

== Track listing ==
=== Original release ===
All tracks are written by Conor Oberst.

No.	Title	Length
1.	"At the Bottom of Everything"	4:34
2.	"We Are Nowhere and It's Now"	4:12
3.	"Old Soul Song (for the New World Order)"	4:30
4.	"Lua"	4:30
5.	"Train Under Water"	6:05
6.	"First Day of My Life"	3:08
7.	"Another Travelin' Song"	4:16
8.	"Land Locked Blues"	5:46
9.	"Poison Oak"	4:50
10.	"Road to Joy"	3:54
Total length:		45:41

=== I'm Wide Awake, It's Morning: A Companion ===
No.	Title	Length
1.	"Old Soul Song (For the New World Order)" (companion version) (featuring Becky Stark)	4:39
2.	"First Day of My Life" (companion version) (featuring Maria Taylor)
3.	"Fare Thee Well, Miss Carousel" (featuring Gillian Welch) (Townes Van Zandt)
4.	"We Are Nowhere and It's Now" (companion version) (featuring Maria Taylor)
5.	"Road to Joy" (companion version)
6.	"Land Locked Blues" (companion version) (featuring Gillian Welch)

== Personnel ==
- Conor Oberst – guitar, vocals
- Mike Mogis – mandolin (tracks 1, 2), pedal steel (tracks 3, 5, 7, 9), 12 string guitar (track 10)
- Nate Walcott – trumpet (tracks 2, 3, 8, 10)
- Nick White – piano (tracks 2, 8), organ (tracks 3, 7, 9, 10), Rhodes (track 5), vibraphone (track 8)
- Jesse Harris – guitar (tracks 1, 2, 5–8)
- Alex McManus – guitar (track 3, 10)
- Tim Luntzel – bass (tracks 1, 3, 6, 7, 8)
- Matt Maginn – bass (tracks 2, 5, 9, 10)
- Jason Boesel – drums (tracks 2, 3, 5, 7, 9)
- Clark Baechle – drums (tracks 3, 7, 10)
- Jim James – vocals (track 1)
- Emmylou Harris – vocals (tracks 2, 7, 8)
- Maria Taylor – vocals (tracks 3, 9)
- Andy LeMaster – vocals (track 3)
- Jake Bellows – harmonica, vocals (track 5)

== Charts ==
Chart performance
Chart (2005)	Peak position
Australian Albums (ARIA)	81
Austrian Albums (Ö3 Austria)	46
Belgian Albums (Ultratop Flanders)	41
Belgian Alternative Albums (Ultratop Flanders)	28
Canadian Albums (Nielsen SoundScan)	93
Dutch Albums (Album Top 100)	53
Dutch Alternative Albums (Alternative Top 30)	1
European Albums (Billboard)	26
German Albums (Offizielle Top 100)	21
Irish Albums (IRMA)	24
Norwegian Albums (VG-lista)	9
Scottish Albums (Official Charts)	23
Swedish Albums (Sverigetopplistan)	12
UK Albums (Official Charts)	23
UK Independent Albums (Official Charts)	3
US Billboard 200	10
US Independent Albums (Billboard)	2

== Certifications ==
Certifications
Region	Certification	Certified units/sales
United Kingdom (BPI)	Gold	100,000^{‡}
United States (RIAA)	Gold	500,000^{^}
^{^} Shipments figures based on certification alone.^{‡} Sales+streaming figures based on certification alone.
