= Heartfelt =

Heartfelt may refer to:

- The Heartfelt, a 2001 album by Figurine
- Heartfelt (Fourplay album) (2002)
- Heartfelt (Kyla album) (2007)
- "Heartfelt", an episode of The Good Doctor
