= Life Is Full of Possibilities =

Studio album by Dntel
- Released: October 30, 2001
- Recorded: 2000–2001
- Studio: Dying Songs (Los Angeles, California)
- Genre: Glitch; IDM; indie electronic
- Length: 54:45
- Label: Plug Research

Dntel chronology
Something Always Goes Wrong (2000)	Life Is Full of Possibilities (2001)	Dumb Luck (2007)

Singles from Life Is Full of Possibilities
- 1. "(This Is) The Dream of Evan and Chan" Released: August 6, 2002

Professional ratings
Aggregate scores
Source	Rating
Metacritic	77/100
Review scores
Source	Rating
AllMusic	4.5/5 stars
The Guardian	3/5 stars
Muzik	4/5
NME	7/10
Pitchfork	9.3/10
PopMatters	8/10
Spin	7/10
Tiny Mix Tapes	5/5
Uncut	4/5 stars

Life Is Full of Possibilities is the third studio album by American electronic music producer Dntel. It was released on October 30, 2001, by Plug Research.

"(This Is) The Dream of Evan and Chan", a collaboration with Ben Gibbard of Death Cab for Cutie, was released as a single on August 6, 2002. Dntel would collaborate with Gibbard again for an entire album, Give Up, released in 2003 under the name The Postal Service. The song "Life Is Full of Possibilities" includes a repeating sample of Bloop, a sound of undetermined origin.

A two-disc remastered deluxe edition of Life Is Full of Possibilities was released on October 24, 2011, by Sub Pop, which featured four additional songs not included on the initial release, along with remixed versions of other songs from the album.

== Track listing ==
All music is composed by Dntel (Jimmy Tamborello).

No.	Title	Length
1.	"Umbrella"	4:43
2.	"Anywhere Anyone" (lyrics by Josh Melnick and Mia Doi Todd)	4:37
3.	"Pillowcase"	3:30
4.	"Fear of Corners"	5:26
5.	"Suddenly Is Sooner Than You Think" (lyrics by Dntel and Meredith Figurine)	5:43
6.	"Life Is Full of Possibilities"	6:30
7.	"Why I'm So Unhappy" (lyrics by Rachel Haden and Brian McMahan)	7:00
8.	"Fireworks"	6:48
9.	"(This Is) The Dream of Evan and Chan" (lyrics by Ben Gibbard)	5:45
10.	"Last Songs"	4:43
Total length:		54:45

Deluxe edition bonus disc
No.	Title	Length
1.	"(This Is) The Dream of Evan and Chan" (Safety Scissors Spilled My Drink mix)	4:13
2.	"(This Is) The Dream of Evan and Chan" (Barbara Morgenstern remix)	4:06
3.	"(This Is) The Dream of Evan and Chan" (Superpitcher Kompakt remix)	7:08
4.	"(This Is) The Dream of Evan and Chan" (Lali Puna remix)	3:41
5.	"Your Hill"	5:38
6.	"This Is How It Will Be All Over"	4:55
7.	"Anywhere Anyone" (Nobody remix)	6:42
8.	"Umbrella" (version 1)	4:46
9.	"Footprints"	6:01
10.	"Last Songs" (vocal version)	4:23
11.	"Sorry_"	5:41
12.	"Anywhere Anyone" (Silent Servant & Regis Sandwell District mix)	5:10
13.	"Anywhere Anyone" (Pearson Sound Beatless Reduction)	6:03
Total length:		68:27

== Personnel ==
Credits are adapted from the album's liner notes.

Musicians

- Dntel – music
- Meredith Figurine – vocals on "Suddenly Is Sooner Than You Think"
- Ben Gibbard – vocals on "(This Is) The Dream of Evan and Chan"
- Chris Gunst – vocals on "Umbrella"
- Rachel Haden – vocals on "Why I'm So Unhappy"
- Paul Larson – guitar on "Last Songs"
- Brian McMahan – guitar on "Why I'm So Unhappy"
- Mia Doi Todd – vocals on "Anywhere Anyone"

Additional personnel

- Low Culture – design
- Brian Tamborello – photography
- D. Zelonky – mastering
