= Human voice (disambiguation) =

Human voice refers to the sound created by human vocal chords. It may also refer to:

- Human Voices, 1980 British novel by Penelope Fitzgerald
- Human Voice (album), 2014 electronic album by Dntel
- The Human Voice, 1928 play by Jean Cocteau
- The Human Voice (film), 2020 Spanish drama short film, based on the play of the same name
- "Human Voice", a song in the 2017 British musical film Anna and the Apocalypse

== See also ==
- Human voice as an instrument
- Voice (disambiguation)
