= Hot Knives =

Single by Bright Eyes

from the album Cassadaga
- Released: July 9, 2007
- Genre: Indie rock, folk rock, country rock
- Label: Polydor
- Songwriter(s): Conor Oberst
- Producer(s): Mike Mogis

Bright Eyes singles chronology
"Easy/Lucky/Free" (2007)	"Hot Knives" (2007)	"I Must Belong Somewhere" (2007)

"Hot Knives" is the second single by the American indie/folk-rock band Bright Eyes, from their album Cassadaga. The song was released on July 9, 2007, on a strictly-limited 7" double A-side record.

Conor Oberst, the band's frontman, allegedly said "Hot Knives is a song.. um, sort of about a woman that kind of discovers that her life is a sham and can't really exist in her reality any longer and has to transform completely into a new, uh, species. It sounds crazy, but it's not that crazy. It could happen to you, too" on the NME Track-by-Track.

== Track listing ==
1. Hot Knives
2. If The Brakeman Turns My Way

== Personnel ==
- Conor Oberst - Guitar, Vocals, Piano
- Mike Mogis - Guitar, Bass, Dobro
- Nate Walcott - Piano, Strings
- Maria Taylor - Vocals, Drums
- M. Ward - Guitar
- Janet Weiss - Drums
- Stacy DuPree - Vocals
- Sherri DuPree - Vocals
- Z Berg - Vocals
- Rachael Yamagata - Vocals
- Bill Meyers – Conductor

== Trivia ==
Bright Eyes played "Hot Knives" on July 4, 2007, on Late Show with David Letterman.

== Music video ==
The video for "Hot Knives" was directed by Patrick Daughters, who also directed "Title and Registration" (Death Cab for Cutie), "Stockholm Syndrome" (Muse), and the video for the previous Bright Eyes single, "Four Winds".
