= Next Time West Coast =

Studio album by Further
- Released: 1995
- Genre: Alternative rock, indie rock
- Label: 100 Guitar Mania

Further chronology
Grimes Golden (1994)	Next Time West Coast (1995)

Next Time West Coast is an album by the band Further released in 1995.

== Track listing ==
1. Be That As It May
2. Victim Rock
3. Grandview Skyline
4. Badgers (Part II)
5. Friends And Enemies
6. Stranger Than Silver
7. You're Just Dead Skin To Me (Written by Primal Scream)
8. Way Too Much
