= First Day of My Life (Bright Eyes song) =

2005 single by Bright Eyes

Single by Bright Eyes

from the album I'm Wide Awake, It's Morning
- Released: February 7, 2005
- Genre: Indie folk
- Length: 3:09
- Label: Saddle Creek
- Songwriter: Conor Oberst

Bright Eyes singles chronology
"When the President Talks to God" (2005)	"First Day of My Life" (2005)	"Easy/Lucky/Free" (2005)

Music video
- "First Day of My Life " on YouTube

"First Day of My Life" is a single from the album I'm Wide Awake, It's Morning by American band Bright Eyes, released on February 7, 2005. The track is an indie love song and the band's biggest mainstream hit, with enduring popularity on streaming services. It reached number 37 on the UK Singles Chart, and did not chart on the Billboard Hot 100. The music video was directed by John Cameron Mitchell.

== History ==
"First Day of My Life" is a tender folk ballad about a new romance, which Oberst compares to a rebirth. Stereogum described it as "universally affecting" and the album's most emotional track, with simple lyrics professing optimism and innocent love, such as "I'm glad I didn't die before I met you." The song culminates with a commitment to the new relationship: "I'd rather be working for a paycheck than waiting to win the lottery".

=== Music video ===
The music video for the song was directed by John Cameron Mitchell and features a diverse cast of people, each shown sitting on a couch as they listen to the song through headphones. The song inspires different emotions and types of love in different characters, including familial love between parents and children, homosexual relationships, and the pain of a widow who carries a picture of her late husband. The video received a Special Recognition in the 2006 GLAAD Media Awards for including gay and lesbian couples.

=== Use in film and media ===
The song can be heard in the films The Bubble (2006) and Elvis and Anabelle (2007), as well as on the episode of The Sarah Silverman Program entitled "Just Breve" (S03 E08; 2010). It was also featured in the episode of the NBC series Chuck entitled "Chuck Versus the Last Details" (S04 E23).

"First Day of My Life" has also been featured in the Netflix mini series Atypical (S02 E06; 2017), in the Showtime series Ray Donovan (S06 E12), and twice in the CW series Roswell, New Mexico (S01 E06; S02 E05). It has been used for a number of commercials, notably in a 2012 Zillow commercial, as well as in a 2021 Citibank commercial.

== Reception ==
In 2009, Pitchfork named the song one of the "Top 500 Tracks of the 2000s", ranking it number 266. In 2020, Paste ranked the song number 7 on their list of the 15 greatest Bright Eyes songs.

Klara Soderberg, of the folk duo First Aid Kit, credits the song with inspiring her to create acoustic folk music: "the simplicity and honesty of it just kind of blew me away. I never really looked back. It was a huge part of opening that door and making me believe that I could make music myself and write songs." James Corden selected the song as one of his favorites on Radio 4's Desert Island Discs.

== Track listing ==
1. "First Day of My Life" (Conor Oberst)
2. "When the President Talks to God" (Oberst)
3. "True Blue" (Oberst)

== Personnel ==
- Conor Oberst – voice, guitar; keyboards and piano on track 3
- Jesse Harris – guitar
- Tim Luntzel – bass

== Certifications ==
Region	Certification	Certified units/sales
New Zealand (RMNZ)	Gold	15,000^{‡}
United Kingdom (BPI)	Silver	200,000^{‡}
United States (RIAA)	Gold	500,000^{‡}
^{‡} Sales+streaming figures based on certification alone.

== Release history ==
Region	Date	Format(s)	Label(s)	Ref.
United States	February 7, 2005	Triple A radio	Saddle Creek	
United Kingdom	March 21, 2005	7-inch vinyl; CD	Saddle Creek	
