= Gold Robot Records =

- Founded: 2007
- Founder: Hunter Mack
- Distributor: Redeye Distribution
- Genre: Indie rock, noise rock, experimental rock
- Country of origin: United States
- Location: Oakland, California
- Official website: www.gold-robot.com/records/

Gold Robot Records is an Oakland-based boutique vinyl record label, formed in 2007 and specializing in vinyl and digital releases. The label has both acted as a platform to launch the careers of burgeoning artists and release small vinyl runs for established names, including Will Oldham (a.k.a. Bonnie "Prince" Billie). To date, Gold Robot Records has issued 38 vinyl releases (including one compilation) and 20 digital releases, as well as releasing free music and remixes from its catalog of artists.

== Artists ==
- Bonnie 'Prince' Billy
- Björn Kleinhenz
- Colossal Yes
- Conveyor
- Fox Hands
- The Good Fear
- James & Evander
- Lady Genius
- Lazy Knuckles
- Man/Miracle
- Meanest Man Contest
- Monster Rally
- Ned Oldham
- Not the 1s
- newageynofriends
- Panther
- The Parish
- Primary Structures
- Roman Ruins
- Railcars
- RUMTUM
- Seamonster
- Sweetie
- Volunteer Pioneer
- Yalls
- Young Hunting

== Vinyl releases ==
- [GRR037] Conveyor - Prime 2x12" (July 15, 2014)
- [GRR036] Roman Ruins - Source of Pride 12" (July 15, 2014)
- [GRR035] Yalls - United 12" (May 6, 2013)
- [GRR034] Conveyor - Mammal Food / Pushups 7" (December 10, 2013)
- [GRR033] Meanest Man Contest - Everything Worth Mentioning 12" (October 29, 2013)
- [GRR032] Monster Rally - Return to Paradise 12" (October 29, 2013)
- [GRR031] Young Hunting - Hazel 12" (June 11, 2013)
- [GRR030] Seamonster - Neighbors 7" (December 4, 2012)
- [GRR029] Monster Rally & RUMTUM - Coasting 12" (December 4, 2012)
- [GRR028] Seamonster - Baldessari 12" (September 11, 2012)
- [GRR027] RUMTUM / Catamaran - New Goth Gypsies 7" (September 4, 2012)
- [GRR026] Monster Rally - Beyond the Sea 12" (June 19, 2012)
- [GRR025] Conveyor - Mane b/w Maine 7" (May 15, 2012)
- [GRR024] James & Evander - Let's Go b/w Welcome To Planet Dance 7" (March 20, 2012)
- [GRR023] Roman Ruins - Homebuilding 12" (February 28, 2012)
- [GRR022] Yalls - Fantasy 7" (February 21, 2012)
- [GRR021] Monster Rally - Crystal Ball 12" (November 1, 2011)
- [GRR020] Primary Structures - S/T 12" (October 11, 2011)
- [GRR019] Monster Rally - Deep Sea 7" (May 31, 2011)
- [GRR018] Not the 1s - Why You Cryin? 12" (June 21, 2011)
- [GRR017] Monster Rally - Coral 12" (January 11, 2011)
- [GRR016] Railcars - Said Sister 7" (April 26, 2011)
- [GRR015] Ned Oldham - Let's Go Out Tonight 7" (September 7. 2010)
- [GRR014] Colossal Yes/Good Fear 7" (July 13, 2010)
- [GRR013] Björn Kleinhenz - Dackes Drabanter (April 6, 2010)
- [GRR012] Roman Ruins - PASTOR/AL (June 29, 2010)
- [GRR011] Seamonster - Two Birds (March 2, 2010)
- [GRR010] Björn Kleinhenz - B.U.R.M.A. (September 29, 2009)
- [GRR009] Designed Entropy I (Compilation) (September 22, 2009)
- [GRR008] Railcars - Cities vs Submarines (September 2008)
- [GRR007] Lady Genius - Lady Genius (August 12, 2008)
- [GRR006] Bonnie 'Prince' Billy - Notes For Future Lovers (July 29, 2008)
- [GRR005] Sweetie - Saturdays (July 1, 2008)
- [GRR004] The Parish - Storm Driven Bird (December 18, 2007)
- [GRR003] Meanest Man Contest - Throwing Away Broken Electronics (September 1, 2007)
- [GRR002] Panther - How Well Can You Swim (February 30, 2007)
- [GRR001] Roman Ruins - Releasing Me / Your House (February 16, 2007)

== Digital releases ==
- [GRRD22] Conveyor - Ani Mag EP (October 21, 2014)
- [GRRD21] Monster Rally & Jay Stone - Cognac (October 14, 2014)
- [GRRD20] Ladada - Ladada (August 5, 2014)
- [GRRD19] Conveyor - Theme XIII (Edit) Single (June 17, 2014)
- [GRRD18] Roman Ruins - Loved One Single (June 10, 2014)
- [GRRD17] Monster Rally - Sunflower EP (April 29, 2014)
- [GRRD16] Conveyor - Theme I (Edit) Single (May 13, 2014)
- [GRRD15] Seamonster - These Bones (October 26, 2010)
- [GRRD14] Monster Rally - MR EP (December 11, 2012)
- [GRRD13] Conveyor - Sun Ray EP (June 12, 2012)
- [GRRD12] Björn Kleinhenz - The Fall of Discontent (April 17, 2012)
- [GRRD11] Monster Rally - Coral II: The Remixes (October 25, 2011)
- [GRRD10] newageynofriends - Yeah (June 1, 2010)
- [GRRD09] Fox Hands - Peoplenoswan (May 25, 2010)
- [GRRD08] Björn Kleinhenz - Head Held High on Fearsome Pride (March 30, 2010)
- [GRRD07] Railcars - Cathedral With No Eyes (September 29, 2009)
- [GRRD06] Fox Hands - Fox Hands EP (2009)
- [GRRD05] Seamonster - The Ascension of Archibald Balloonhead (March 10, 2007)
- [GRRD04] Man/Miracle - Pushing and Shoving (January 2009)
- [GRRD03] Meanest Man Contest - We Blame You (July 24, 2008)
- [GRRD02] Roman Ruins - EP (January 22, 2008)
- [GRRD01] Volunteer Pioneer - EP (January 8, 2008)

== See also ==
- List of record labels
