= The Tarnished Gold =

Studio album by Beachwood Sparks
- Released: June 26, 2012
- Recorded: 2010–2012
- Genre: Indie rock, alternative country
- Length: 43:51
- Label: Sub Pop
- Producer: Thom Monahan

Beachwood Sparks chronology
| Make the Cowboy Robots Cry EP (2002) | The Tarnished Gold (2012) | Across the River of Stars (2024) |

The Tarnished Gold is the third full-length album released on June 26, 2012, by Los Angeles based alt-country band Beachwood Sparks and their fourth release on US label Sub Pop.

== Track listing ==
The Tarnished Gold track listing
| No. | Title | Length |
|---|---|---|
| 1. | "Forget the Song" | 3:38 |
| 2. | "Sparks Fly Again" | 4:37 |
| 3. | "Mollusk" | 2:34 |
| 4. | "Tarnished Gold" | 2:53 |
| 5. | "Water from the Well" | 3:41 |
| 6. | "Talk About Lonesome" | 3:08 |
| 7. | "Leave That Light On" | 4:50 |
| 8. | "Nature's Light" | 4:41 |
| 9. | "No Queremos Oro" | 2:04 |
| 10. | "Earl Jean" | 3:00 |
| 11. | "Alone Together" | 4:26 |
| 12. | "The Orange Grass Special" | 2:05 |
| 13. | "Goodbye" | 2:08 |
