= The Jim Yoshii Pile-Up =

American band

The Jim Yoshii Pile-Up was a five-piece band formed in 1997 in Oakland, California. Named after a high school friend of the band, their highly textured sound spans the range from indie to post-rock. They have released three full lengths on Absolutely Kosher Records. The Jim Yoshii Pile-Up has recorded with Christopher Walla of Death Cab for Cutie and Xiu Xiu. As of 2006, the band is on hiatus. Paul Gonzenbach is currently releasing albums under his own name. Noah Blumberg is in the duo Meanest Man Contest.

== Members ==
- Paul Gonzenbach - guitar, vocals, piano
- Ryan Craven - drums
- Frankie Koeller - bass
- Sikwaya Condon - guitar (1997-2001)
- Noah Blumberg - guitar (2001–Present)
- Ian Connelly - guitar (2000–Present)

== Discography ==
=== Albums ===
- It's Winter Here (March, 2001)
- Homemade Drugs (October, 2002)
- Picks Us Apart (July, 2005)

=== EPs ===
- Self-Titled CD-EP (1999)
- It's Winter Somewhere (2001)
- Burning Flag (Self-Released Tour EP, (2002)

=== Splits ===
- Split 7" with Wussom Pow (September, 2002)
- Split CD with Xiu Xiu (July, 2003)
- Split 7" with Meanest Man Contest (2003)

=== Compilation appearances ===
- Cool Beans issue # comp (Cool Beans, 2000)
- Tired of Standing Still (Highpoint Lowlife, 2001)
