= Sometimes Chimes =

Studio album by Further
- Released: 1994
- Genres: Alternative rock, Indie rock
- Length: 75:08
- Language: English
- Label: Christmas

Further chronology
Super Griptape (1993)	Sometimes Chimes (1994)	Grimes Golden (1994)

Sometimes Chimes is an album by the band Further released in 1994.

== Track listing ==
CD edition
No.	Title	Length
1.	"Surfing Pointers"	4:29
2.	"Generic 7"	2:56
3.	"Duck Pond"	1:53
4.	"Ferrets and Weasels"	3:29
5.	"Brian and Ray"	2:21
6.	"She Lives by the Castle 2"	3:39
7.	"The Kindergarten Set"	2:48
8.	"Phase Out"	3:24
9.	"J.O.2"	1:53
10.	"Unstuck"	2:24
11.	"Sometimes Too"	2:34
12.	"Pioneer 10"	0:55
13.	"Isabel"	3:08
14.	"Jaded Ball"	7:56
15.	"Doof Amuz 6 (The Love Machine)"	2:55
16.	"Going to Glendora"	2:45
17.	"Traction in the Rain"	4:42
18.	"Ride"	2:36
19.	"Big Spoon"	2:11
20.	"Katdancer"	2:59
21.	"Sickness"	2:24
22.	"Organ Donor"	1:22
23.	"Further Doh Jr-Q"	2:08
24.	"Alternative Ulcer"	2:12
25.	"New Glass"	4:54
Total length:		75:08

Vinyl edition
No.	Title	Length
1.	"Surfing Pointers"
2.	"Generic 7 Litebeams"
3.	"Duck Pond"
4.	"Ferrets and Weasels"
5.	"Brian and Ray"
6.	"She Lives by the Castle 2"
7.	"The Kindergarten Set"
8.	"J.O.2"
9.	"Unstuck"
10.	"Sometimes Too"
11.	"Pioneer 10"
12.	"Isabel"
13.	"Jaded Ball"
14.	"Phase Out"
15.	"Doof Amuz 6 (The Love Machine)"
16.	"Going to Glendora"
17.	"Traction in the Rain"
18.	"Ride"
19.	"Big Spoon"
20.	"Katdancer"
21.	"Poor Old Soul Pt. 3"
22.	"Sickness"
23.	"Organ Donor"
24.	"The Curse"
25.	"Further Doh Jr-Q"
26.	"Alternative Ulcer"
27.	"New Glass"
