= Super Griptape =

Studio album by Further
- Released: 1993
- Genre: Alternative rock, Indie rock
- Label: Ball Product

Further chronology
Grip Tape (1992)	Super Griptape (1993)	Sometimes Chimes (1993)

Super Griptape is an album by the band Further released in 1993; it is UK re-issue of the original US Griptape LP with 3 bonus tracks; this release omits the original opening track "Overrated".

== Track listing ==
1. Totally Baked - 6.33
2. Don't Need A Rope - 3.22
3. Real Gone - 2.47
4. Gimmie Indie Fox - 4.08
5. Greasy - 1.28
6. Angela Rites Th Rckrs - 5.19
7. Bazooka - 1.31
8. Still - 7.35
9. Flounder (Ubel) - 0.33
10. Fix It's Broken - 6.59
11. Teenage Pants - 3.17
12. The Death Of An A&R Man - 1.56
13. Smudge - 2.19
14. Fantastic Now - 6.12
15. Filling Station - 4.49
16. Under And In - 1.37
17. Westward Ho (Wharton's Trip) - 8.52
