= The Golden State (Mia Doi Todd album) =

Studio album by Mia Doi Todd
- Released: September 3, 2002
- Genre: Adult Alternative
- Length: 45:52
- Label: Columbia; CK-86395
- Producer: Mitchell Froom, Yves Beauvais, and Mia Doi Todd

Mia Doi Todd chronology
zeroone (2001)	The Golden State (2002)	Manazanita (2005)

Professional ratings
Review scores
Source	Rating
AllMusic	4.5/5 stars
Pitchfork Media	7.0/10 stars

The Golden State is the first studio album by Mia Doi Todd, released September 3, 2002 by Columbia Records. It was made up of songs culled from her previous acoustic albums and was produced in cooperation with Mitchell Froom and Yves Beauvais. It was recorded at the Sunset Sound Factory.

== Track listing ==
No.	Title	Length
1.	"88 Ways"	4:28
2.	"Digital"	3:36
3.	"Independence Day"	4:38
4.	"Merry Me"	4:32
5.	"Like A Knife"	4:48
6.	"Autumn"	3:03
7.	"Growing Pains"	6:06
8.	"Poppy Fields"	4:56
9.	"Hijikata"	3:44
10.	"Age Of Reason"	5:57
Total length:		45:58
