= Aimlessness (album) =

Studio album by Dntel
- Released: June 1, 2012
- Genre: Electronic
- Label: Pampa Records

Dntel chronology
Dumb Luck (2007)	Aimlessness (2012)	Human Voice (2014)

Professional ratings
Aggregate scores
Source	Rating
Metacritic	68/100
Review scores
Source	Rating
AllMusic	3.5/5 stars
Beats Per Minute	69%
Pitchfork	(5.0/10)
Tiny Mix Tapes	2/5 marks

Aimlessness is an album by Dntel, released on June 1, 2012. It is Dntel's first LP under the Pampa Records label.

== Reception ==
Aimlessness received mixed reviews from critics. On Metacritic, the album holds a score of 68/100 based on 10 reviews, indicating "generally favorable reviews".

== Track listing ==
1. "Waitingfortherest II"
2. "Jitters"
3. "Still"
4. "My Orphaned Son"
5. "Bright Night"
6. "Retracer"
7. "Puma"
8. "Santa Ana Winds"
9. "Trudge"
10. "Jitters (Geotic Mix)"
11. "Doc (Dntel Mix)"
12. "Paper Landscape"
