= Come Out of Your Mine =

Studio album by Mia Doi Todd
- Released: 1999
- Length: 42:19
- Label: City Zen

Mia Doi Todd chronology
The Ewe and the Eye (1997)	Come Out of Your Mine (1999)	Zeroone (2001)

Professional ratings
Review scores
Source	Rating
AllMusic	4.5/5 stars

Come Out of Your Mine is an album by Mia Doi Todd, released in 1999 by City Zen Records.

== Track listing ==
1. "Independence Day" - 4:41
2. "Strawberries" - 3:13
3. "Jackals" - 5:51
4. "Save Me" - 2:07
5. "Hijikata Tatsumi" - 3:02
6. "Your Room" - 2:52
7. "Sunday Afternoon" - 3:42
8. "I've Got A Gun" - 2:56
9. "Spring" - 2:56
10. "Strange Wind" - 2:52
11. "Age" - 1:25
12. "The River & The Ocean" - 6:42
