= Beachwood Sparks =

American alternative country band

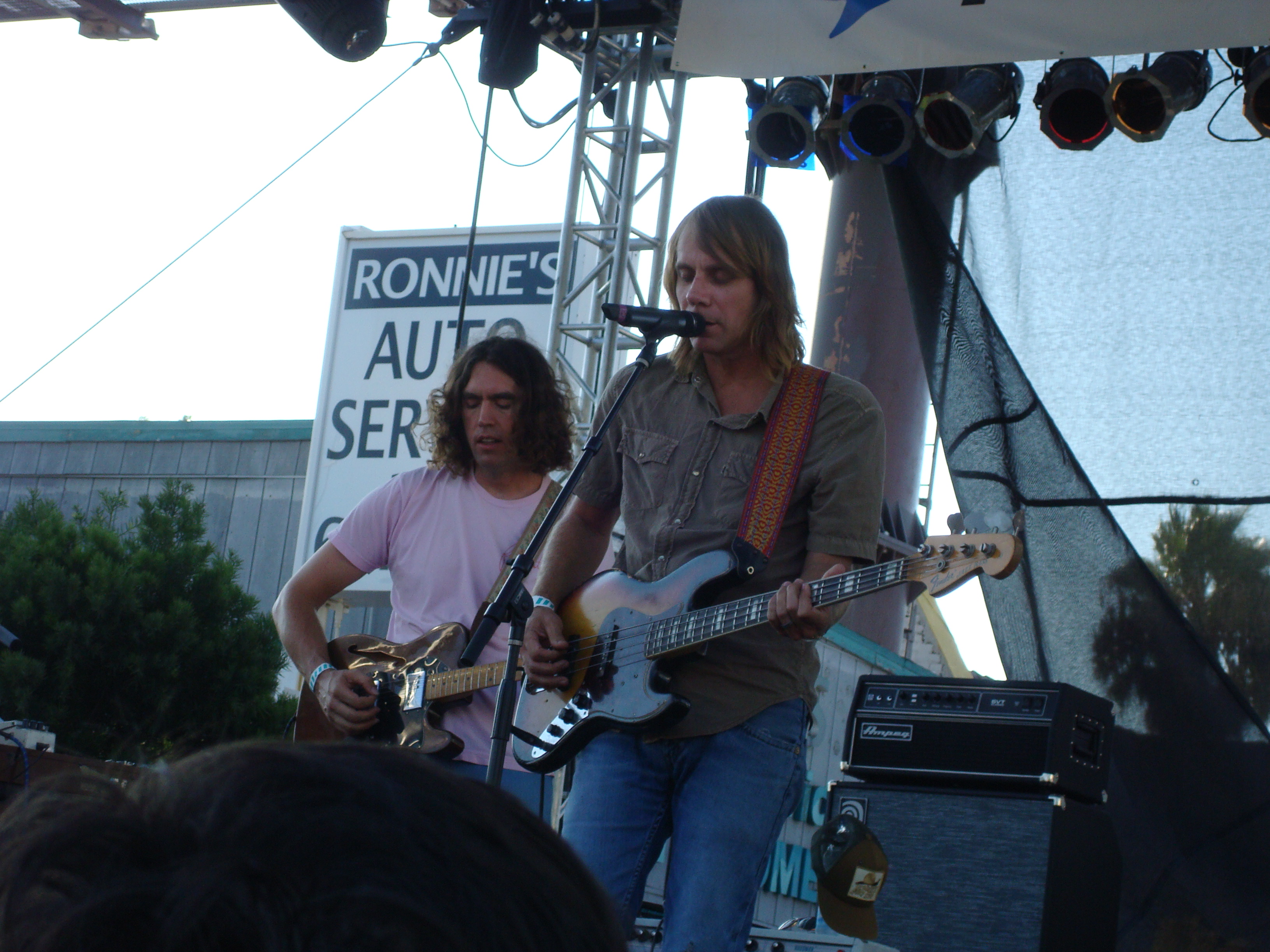
- Beachwood Sparks performing in 2008

Background information
- Origin: Los Angeles, California, United States
- Genres: Alternative country; psychedelic pop
- Years active: 1997–2002, 2008–present
- Labels: Sub Pop (US); Rough Trade (UK); Houston Party Music; Bomp!; Underground Liberation Force; Curation
- Members: Christopher Gunst; Brent Rademaker; Andres Renteria; "Farmer" Dave Scher; Ben Knight; Jen Cohen Gunst
- Past members: Jimi Hey; Tom Sanford; Pete "Sleigher" Kinne; Josh Schwartz; Ian Mackinnon; Aaron Sperske; Liz Randall; Neal Casal
- Website: curationrecords.com

Beachwood Sparks are an American alternative country band from Los Angeles. An article in The Daily Telegraph on America's underground psychedelic pop scene described Beachwood Sparks as "country through a kaleidoscope".

== Biography ==
The band was formed by bassist Brent Rademaker and guitarist Christopher Gunst who met in the 1990s when both were members of Los Angeles indie-rock group Further. Guitarist Dave Scher and drummer Jimi Hey (who played with Gunst in Strictly Ballroom) were recruited before the band's first show in June 1997.

Hey suggested the band's name by combining Sparks Street, where Rademaker lived in Burbank, with Beachwood Drive, which runs parallel and adjacent to Sparks. Hey left after a few shows and was replaced by Tom Sanford. At around the same time, the group was also joined by Pete "Sleigher" Kinne on percussion and another former Further member, guitarist Josh Schwartz.

They released the "Desert Skies"/"Make It Together" single on Bomp! in October 1998. Sanford left and was replaced by Aaron Sperske, drummer with Lilys, whose first recording with the band was on the Sub Pop singles club release "Midsummer Daydream"/"Windows 65" issued in April 1999. Kinne and Schwartz left shortly after.

In spring 2000, they released their first album, Beachwood Sparks. The "shimmering twang-pop melodies and gorgeous harmonies" drew comparisons to the late 1960s' Laurel Canyon country-rock of The Byrds, Buffalo Springfield and Gram Parsons as well as to contemporaries Elephant 6.

The single "Once We Were Trees" (featuring a jangly cover of The Everly Brothers' "Wake Up, Little Suzie" on the B-side) was released on the Spanish label Houston Party Records, previewing the mellower sound that featured on the band's second album, also called Once We Were Trees, which was released in the second half of 2001.

A single from the album, a cover of Sade's "By Your Side", was released in the United Kingdom and enjoyed some chart success. The video, directed by Chad Misner, was selected for the 2002 South by Southwest Film Festival and featured footage of Aaron Sperske and Autumn de Wilde's wedding. The song was later featured on the soundtrack for the 2010 feature film Scott Pilgrim vs. the World.

For the 2002 EP, Make the Cowboy Robots Cry, Sperske was replaced on drums by the returning Jimi Hey. Strictly Ballroom's Jimmy Tamborello, a.k.a. Dntel, contributed to the EP. Tamborello also worked with Scher and Gunst at Loyola Marymount University's radio station, KXLU.

Since 2002, the band has mostly concentrated on other projects. Gunst formed Mystic Chords of Memory. Brent Rademaker, sometimes with Gunst and Scher, plays in The Tyde and also in Frausdots. Hey and Scher released an album as All Night Radio. In March 2007, Scher was recruited as touring keyboard player for New York indie rockers Interpol. Sperske joined Ariel Pink's Haunted Graffiti.

Beachwood Sparks reunited in 2008 to play at SB20, the celebration of Sub Pop's 20th anniversary. A small number of dates were played on the West Coast and the East Coast, including July 19 at the Henry Miller Library in Big Sur, California. The reunion line-up was Gunst, Rademaker, Sperske, Ben Knight, Jen Cohen and Dan Horne. Scher also played at four of the West Coast shows.

In 2012, Beachwood Sparks released the album The Tarnished Gold. The recording session included Neal Casal, Dan Horne, Jen Cohen, Jimi Hey, Darren Rademaker and Ariel Pink.

In 2016, Neal Casal, Farmer Dave Scher, Dan Horne, and Aaron Sperske joined songwriter Cass McCombs to form The Skiffle Players. Their debut album Skifflin was released that year, followed by the Piffle Sayers EP and Skiff in 2018.

Band co-founder Josh Schwartz died in September 2017 from complications from ALS.

== Discography ==
Studio albums

- Beachwood Sparks (2000, Sub Pop)
- Once We Were Trees (2001, Sub Pop)
- The Tarnished Gold (2012, Sub Pop)
- Across the River of Stars (2024, Curation)

Other albums

- Make the Cowboy Robots Cry EP (2002, Sub Pop)
- Desert Skies (2013, Recorded 1997, Alive Naturalsound)
- Beachwood Deluxe (2021 Curation Records)

Singles

- "Desert Skies"/"Make It Together" (1998) Bomp Records)
- "Midsummer Daydream"/"Windows 65" (1999)
- "Once We Were Trees"/"Wake Up, Little Suzie" (2000)
- "Ballad of Never Rider" (w/ "Fishing Boat Song by Grandaddy and "Table Tennis Star" by Persil) (2000 Devil in the Woods No. 38)
- "By Your Side"/"Sun Surrounds Me"/"Quietly Be"/"Close the Door Lightly When You Go" (2001 Sub Pop)

Compilation and soundtrack appearances

- "By Your Side" from Scott Pilgrim vs. the World: Original Motion Picture Soundtrack (2010)
