= When the President Talks to God =

2005 Bright Eyes song

Single by Bright Eyes
- Released: 2005
- Recorded: 2005
- Genre: Indie folk, anti-folk, protest song, emo, lo-fi
- Length: 2:36
- Label: Saddle Creek LBJ-77
- Songwriter(s): Conor Oberst

Bright Eyes singles chronology
| "Take It Easy (Love Nothing)" (2004) | "When the President Talks to God" (2005) | "First Day of My Life" (2005) |

"When the President Talks to God" is a protest song by Bright Eyes. It is a pointed political message directed towards George W. Bush and his policies. It was originally released as a free download on iTunes but was subsequently released as a promotional 7" vinyl and as a B-side to "First Day of My Life".

On May 2, 2005, Conor Oberst performed the song on The Tonight Show with Jay Leno.

In June 2006, Oberst expressed that he was "over" the song from having played it too many times.

It won Song of the Year at the 2006 PLUG Independent Music Awards.

Early in the morning on December 19, 2006, the song was offered as a featured free download on the front page of the iTunes Store, but was removed within hours without explanation.

== Track listing ==
1. "When the President Talks to God" (Conor Oberst) – 2:36

== See also ==
- List of anti-war songs
