= Grimes Golden (album) =

Studio album by Further
- Released: 1994
- Genre: Alternative rock, Indie rock
- Label: Fingerpaint

Further chronology
| Sometimes Chimes (1993) | Grimes Golden (1994) | Next Time West Coast (1996) |

Grimes Golden is the third album by American indie rock band Further released in 1994.

== Track listing ==
1. California Bummer
2. Inert Pieces
3. Quiet Riot Grrrl
4. Summer Shorts
5. Artificial Freedom
6. 20 Pages
7. This Time Around
8. Teenage Soul
9. V.S. Livingston Seagull
- 1995 version (Italy, Runt runt07)
1. California Bummer
2. Inert Pieces
3. Quiet Riot Grrrl
4. Summer Shorts
5. Artificial Freedom
6. 20 Pages
7. This Time Around
8. Teenage Soul
9. ... V.S. (Livingston Seagull)
10. Badgers 1
11. Don't Know How Long
12. 6 Gun Territory
13. J.O. Eleven
