= Beachwood Sparks (album) =

Studio album by Beachwood Sparks
- Released: 2000
- Recorded: 1999
- Genre: Alternative country, pop
- Length: 41:34
- Label: Sub Pop
- Producer: Mike Deming

Beachwood Sparks chronology
Beachwood Sparks (2000)	Once We Were Trees (2001)

Beachwood Sparks is the debut album by the American band Beachwood Sparks, released in 2000.

== Reception ==
Professional ratings
Review scores
Source	Rating
AllMusic	5/5 stars
The Guardian	4/5 stars
Los Angeles Times	3.5/4 stars
NME	7/10
Pitchfork	7.1/10
Q	4/5 stars

The Washington Post wrote that, "like the work of many pop revivalists, the Sparks' music doesn't really recapture the spirit of its models; it has more craft than character."

In 2009, Neal Casal of Ryan Adams & the Cardinals named Beachwood Sparks as one of his favorite albums of all time.

== Track listing ==
1. "Desert Skies"
2. "Ballad of Never Rider"
3. "Silver Morning After"
4. "Singing Butterfly"
5. "Sister Rose"
6. "This Is What It Feels Like"
7. "Canyon Ride"
8. "The Reminder"
9. "The Calming Seas"
10. "New Country"
11. "Something I Don't Recognize"
12. "Old Sea Miner"
13. "See Oh Three"
14. "Sleeping Butterfly"
