= Meredith Figurine =

American singer

Meredith Landman is an American singer and linguist. She is one of two vocalists for the band Figurine.

She has also recorded the track "A Symphony for Eric B." for Simball Rec's 45 seconds of compilation, sung "Diamond Ring" with Jason Corace of Boothby, and appeared on Dntel's Life Is Full of Possibilities, providing vocals for "Suddenly Is Sooner Than You Think" as well as Dntel's 7" single "Don't Get Your Hopes Up".

Landman is currently a lecturer and the director of undergraduate studies in linguistics at Columbia University. Her research interests focus on cross-linguistic variation. She previously taught at Pomona College.
