= Zeroone =

Studio album by Mia Doi Todd
- Released: 2001
- Label: City Zen

Mia Doi Todd chronology
Come Out of Your Mine (1999)	Zeroone (2001)	The Golden State (2002)

Professional ratings
Review scores
Source	Rating
Pitchfork Media	(7.1/10)

Zeroone is an album by Mia Doi Todd, released in 2001 by City Zen Records.

== Track listing ==
1. Digital
2. Poppy Fields
3. Obsession
4. Ziggurat
5. Bound Feet & Feathered
6. Merry Me
7. Can I?
8. Amnesia
9. Like A Knife
10. Tugboat
