= Persil (band) =

Persil are a two-piece electronic guitar pop band from Amsterdam.

== Band members ==
David: guitar, keyboard, bass, drum programming. Martine: vocals, keyboards, sampler.

== History ==
Persil made its BBC Radio 1 debut in 1998, when John Peel played a track from the band's first demo in his show. Over the years John Peel played dozens of Persil tracks in his BBC shows, including eight tracks from Persil's first album Duotone. Persil recorded three Peel sessions.

Persil's debut album Duotone was released on Transformed Dreams in 2004. Since the album release Persil has played numerous gigs in the UK, Netherlands and USA, including showcases at the SXSW Festival in Texas, USA (2004), at the In The City Festival in Manchester, UK (2004), at the Eurosonic Festival in Groningen, the Netherlands (2006) and at the Go North Festival in Aberdeen, UK (2006).

After meeting Debbie Harry in New York, Persil were invited to support Blondie on their only Dutch show in June 2004.

In 2005 Persil supported The Wedding Present on nine sold out UK dates. They also released Tune-up, a new EP. Tracks from the Tune-up EP have been played by BBC DJ's Steve Lamacq, Huw Stephens and Rob Da Bank.

Their second full-length album Comfort Noise was released in 2006.

== Discography ==
=== Albums ===
- Duotone CD (2004)
- Comfort Noise CD (2006)

=== Singles / E.P.s ===
- "Agony Aunt" / "Dear John" (1999)
- Snapcracklepop EP (2002)
- Tune-up EP (2005)

=== Other releases ===
- Persil / Zea (split 7-inch) - split single with the band Zea.
- "Table Tennis Star" (split w/ "Fishing Boat Song by Grandaddy and "Ballad of Never Rider" by Beachwood Sparks) (2000 Devil in the Woods #38)
