= Once We Were Trees =

Studio album by Beachwood Sparks
- Released: Oct 9 2001
- Recorded: ??
- Genres: Indie rock, alternative country
- Length: 51:13
- Label: Sub Pop
- Producer: Thom Monahan

Beachwood Sparks chronology
Beachwood Sparks (2000)	Once We Were Trees (2001)	Make the Cowboy Robots Cry EP (2002)

Professional ratings
Review scores
Source	Rating
Allmusic	link
Pitchfork Media	6.6/10 link
Robert Christgau	link
Rock Sound	1.5/5 stars

Once We Were Trees is the second album by American alt-country band Beachwood Sparks, released in 2001.

== Track listing ==
1. "Germination"
2. "Confusion Is Nothing New"
3. "The Sun Surrounds Me"
4. "You Take the Gold"
5. "Hearts Mend"
6. "Let It Run"
7. "Old Manatee"
8. "The Hustler"
9. "Yer Selfish Ways"
10. "By Your Side"
11. "Close Your Eyes"
12. "Banjo Press Conference"
13. "Jugglers' Revenge"
14. "The Good Night Whistle"
15. "Once We Were Trees" –

"By Your Side" is partially based on Sade's song of the same name.
