= Arthur & Yu =

- Origin: Seattle, Washington, United States
- Genres: Indie folk Alternative
- Years active: 2006-present
- Labels: Memphis Industries; Stomp Records & Records; Hardly Art
- Spinoff of: Rogue Wave
- Members: Grant Olsen; Sonya Westcott
- Website: Official Record Label Site

Arthur & Yu are an American indie folk band from Seattle, Washington, United States. Their sound has been compared to that of various 1960s bands, as well as an aesthetic appeal of John Lennon/Yoko Ono. The duo's title has its roots from childhood nicknames, 'Arthur' and 'Yu', for Olsen and Westcott, respectively. They have been touring across the U.S. in promotion of their debut, In Camera. They were also featured on Dntel's album, Dumb Luck.

== History ==
Olsen stumbled upon Westcott, who had a stint as the bassist for Rogue Wave, through a Craigslist ad, and they were both intrigued at each other's influences. The two met up and began playing demos of each other's songs. The duo originally began playing music with each other in one another's homes, moving up to local bar shows, without intent of being 'discovered' or signed to a record label. According to a Portland Mercury interview, Olsen explains that the songs were never meant to travel beyond the two, but Sub Pop founder Jonathan Poneman wished to release the songs on his new record label Hardly Art.

=== In Camera ===
Having drawn some comparisons to Velvet Underground, the two developed a steady fanbase shortly after their debut In Camera was released on June 19, 2007. The album's name is perhaps a nod to an early film editing technique, but it could also be a reference to the judicial term which can loosely be defined as a secret or private deliberation process. The two have also been featured on Dntel's record Dumb Luck on the fifth track, titled The Distance. The official video can be found here. The band has toured the United States and Japan in support of their debut with bands such as Iron & Wine, Broken Social Scene, Great Lake Swimmers, and The Album Leaf.

== Discography ==
=== Albums ===
- In Camera (June 19, 2007)

=== Collaborations ===
- The Distance, track five on Dntel's Dumb Luck (April 24, 2007)
