= Railcars (band) =

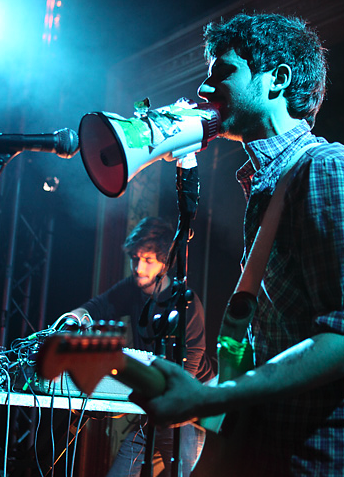
- Railcars at Fleche d'Or, Paris, France 2/20/2009

Background information
- Origin: San Francisco, California, U.S.
- Genres: Shitgaze, experimental rock, noise pop
- Years active: 2005–present
- Labels: Gold Robot Records; Stumparumper Records; Room Tapes
- Members: Aria Jalali
- Website: Official MySpace

Railcars is an American, San Francisco-based shitgaze project of Aria C Jalali. For the project's initial release, Jalali teamed up with Xiu Xiu front man Jamie Stewart to produce his follow up EP "Cities vs Submarines" in 2008 (released on Gold Robot Records). Jalali has said he will not be teaming with Stewart again to produce his next album, Cathedral With No Eyes, due to logistical reasons, namely Stewart's move to North Carolina. Railcars' music is described as having "pastel-coloured vocals suitably warped, but with a low-cut frenetic backdrop surrounding them."

== Releases ==
- 2011: Hounds of Love (Kate Bush cover album) (Crash Symbols, Amdiscs)
- 2011: "Said Sister" 7" Vinyl (Gold Robot Records)
- 2010: remixes (digital, s/r)
- 2009: Cathedral With No Eyes 12" Vinyl (Stumparumper)
- 2009: Live @ Fleche d'Or, Paris Cassette (Room Tapes)
- 2008: "Cities vs. Submarines" 7" Vinyl (Gold Robot Records)
