= In Camera (Arthur & Yu album) =

Studio album by Arthur & Yu
- Released: June 19th, 2007
- Recorded: 2006–2007
- Genre: Alternative
- Label: Hardly Art

In Camera is the debut studio album by the American band Arthur & Yu. It was self-released on June 19, 2007 on Hardly Art Records, which branches off Sub Pop. Stylistically, comparisons to The Velvet Underground and early Luna have been drawn, with a hazy atmospheric sound present in the album.

== Track listing ==
1. "Absurd Heroes Manifestos" – 3:59
2. "Come to View (Song for Neil Young)" – 3:25
3. "There Are Too Many Birds" – 2:56
4. "Afterglow" – 3:47
5. "Flashing the Lobby Lights" – 2:43
6. "1000 Words" – 2:40
7. "Lion's Mouth" – 5:13
8. "The Ghost of Old Bull Lee" – 2:42
9. "Half Years" – 3:23
10. "Black Bear" – 4:11
