= All Night Radio (band) =

American indie rock band

- Origin: Los Angeles, California, United States
- Genres: Indie pop, neo-psychedelia
- Years active: 2002–2004
- Label: Sub Pop Records
- Past members: Dave Scher; Jimi Hey

All Night Radio was an American indie rock band formed in Los Angeles, California, United States.

== History ==
Dave Scher and Jimi Hey, hail from Los Angeles, and have known each other since 1995, when a 16-year-old Hey would call Scher's late-night radio program on KXLU requesting Six Finger Satellite on a repeated basis. This KXLU connection led them to playing music together in Bee Venom and later resulted in the formation of the more psychedelic country-minded Beachwood Sparks. In between leaving the group in 1997 and rejoining it in 2002, Hey also turned up in groups such as Strictly Ballroom, Tristeza, Glass Candy and the Shattered Theater, and The Rapture. The two have also moonlighted as members of Lilys. After completing the Beachwood Sparks’ tour of summer 2002, Scher and Hey joined forces to create All Night Radio. They dubbed this new sound the “Spirit Stereo Frequency.”

The band broke up due to creative differences in 2004.

== Members ==
- Dave Scher – vocals, keyboards, guitar, pedal steel, sound effects
- Jimi Hey – vocals, drums, bass, glockenspiel, percussion, sound effects, synthesiser

== Discography ==
=== Albums ===
- Spirit Stereo Frequency, (2004), Sub Pop Records
