= Meanest Man Contest =

Hip hop and electronic music duo

- Origin: San Francisco, California; Los Angeles, California
- Genres: Hip hop Electronica
- Years active: 2002 - Present
- Labels: Sneakmove; Gold Robot Records; Plug Research; RCRD LBL
- Members: Eriksolo (Eric Steuer); Quarterbar (Noah Blumberg)
- Website: Official Website

Meanest Man Contest is a hip hop and electronic music duo based in San Francisco, California. The members are Quarterbar (Noah Blumberg) and Eriksolo (Eric Steuer).

As college roommates, Noah Blumberg and Eric Steuer started making lo-fi rap songs on a 4-track, then recruited friends to create the Santa Barbara hip-hop crew mic.edu. The duo formed Meanest Man Contest after a move upstate to Oakland, where they searched through stacks of flea market records looking for samples. From this effort came a series of short tracks that would form MMC's collage-like first single, Contaminated Dance Step. MMC's first LP, Merit, included jazz samples and live guitar. More recently, the duo has expanded its musical approach with releases like the off-kilter pop EP Some People, the electro-tinged single Throwing Away Broken Electronics, and the hip-hop releases Split and Partially Smart. In 2013 the group released Everything Worth Mentioning.

== Discography ==
=== Albums ===
Year	Title	Label
2003	Merit	Plug Research
2013	Everything Worth Mentioning	Gold Robot Records

=== EPs ===
Year	Title	Label
2007	Split (split CD with Languis)	Sneakmove
2007	Some People (digital only)	Plug Research
2008	Partially Smart (digital only)	RCRD LBL
2008	We Blame You (digital only)	Gold Robot Records

=== Singles ===
Year	Title	Label
2002	"Contaminated Dance Step"	Weapon-Shaped
2004	"I Was Only Kidding" (split 7-inch with The Jim Yoshii Pile-Up)	Weapon-Shaped
2007	"Throwing Away Broken Electronics"	Gold Robot Records

=== Compilations ===
Year	Title	Label
2002	45 seconds of:	simballrec
2007	Incite 50	XLR8R
2007	Sneakmove Minicomp 2	Sneakmove
2009	Designed Entropy 1	Gold Robot Records
2009	Leaders	Briefcase Rockers
