= Grip Tape =

Griptape

Studio album by Further
- Released: 1992
- Genres: Alternative rock, Indie rock
- Label: Christmas
- Producer: Wharton Tiers

Further chronology
Griptape (1992)	Super Griptape (1993)

Griptape is an album by the band Further, released in 1992.

Lee Ranaldo of Sonic Youth guests on tracks 3 and 6.

== Critical reception ==
Professional ratings
Review scores
Source	Rating
AllMusic	3.5/5 stars

Trouser Press called the album "a riot of distortion and croaky off-key singing, straggling happily through its peppy and tuneful pop-song bits to reach the chewy center of slack squall jams each contains."

== Track listing ==
1. Overrated
2. Filling Station
3. Flounder (Ubel)
4. Real Gone
5. Gimme Indie Fox
6. Still
7. Smudge
8. Greasy
9. Bazzoka
10. Fix Its Broken
11. Don't Need a Rope
12. Fantastic Now
13. Under and In
14. Death of an A&R Man
15. Westward Ho
