= Young Hunting (band) =

American band

Young Hunting is an American, Los Angeles-based dream pop, indie band, featuring members: Hari Rex (vocals/guitar), Ilya Mxx (vocals/guitar), Patrick Taylor (bass), and Miles Senzaki (drums). They are signed with Gold Robot Records and have released their second album. A couple of the band's members also played with The Pharcyde and Syl Johnson.

== Discography ==
- 2024: "All I Wanna Do" (Single feat. Tomemitsu)
- 2019: True Believers (LP)
- 2013: Hazel (LP)
- 2010: "Into Yr Mind" & "Sonata" (7" EP)
