= Further (band) =

American indie rock band

- Origin: Los Angeles, California
- Genres: Alternative rock, Indie rock
- Years active: 1990s
- Labels: Christmas Records, Creation, Fierce Panda, 100 Guitar Mania Records
- Past members: Brent Rademaker; Darren Rademaker; Josh Schwartz; Kevin Fitzgerald; Pete "Sleigher" Kinne; Chris Gunst; Jimmy Tamborelllo; Tom Sanford; Keith Olsen

Further was an American indie rock band from Los Angeles that evolved from an earlier band, Shadowland. They released several albums during the 1990s.

== History ==
Further evolved from Shadowland, a sixties-influenced band led by brothers Brent and Darren Rademaker, that released two albums for Geffen Records in 1989 and 1990 (Shadowland and The Beauty of Escaping respectively). Unlike Shadowland, Further were very much an indie rock band, gaining comparisons with the likes of Dinosaur Jr and Sonic Youth (Lee Ranaldo even guesting on their debut album). Their second album, Sometimes Chimes, contained 25 tracks, and drew comparisons to Beck, Unrest, Pavement and Sebadoh. Fitzgerald left the group before the release of their third album, Grimes Golden, and the three remaining members traded off on the drumming duties in a volleyball rotation a la Sebadoh. The band became sufficiently popular in the United Kingdom to have records released on Creation Records (an expanded version of their debut album) and Fierce Panda. In 1995, the band recorded a five-track session for John Peel's BBC Radio 1 show. The band's final album, Next Time West Coast, saw the band's sound shift towards the sixties/seventies-rock sound that the brothers would go on to explore in their later groups, Beachwood Sparks, The Tyde, and GospelbeacH.

== Discography ==
=== Albums ===
- Grip Tape (1992) Christmas - Super Griptape (1993 UK re-issue of the original US Griptape LP with 3 bonus tracks. This re-release omits the original opening track "Overrated".) Ball Product/Creation
- Sometimes Chimes (1994) Christmas
- Grimes Golden (1994) Fingerpaint/Runt
- Next Time West Coast (1995) 100 Guitar Mania (Japan)

=== Singles & EPs ===
- "Filling Station" (1992) Bong Load
- "Over & Out" (1992) Christmas
- "Overrated" (1993) No Guff
- In A Lonely Place EP (1993) Four Letter Words (split EP with Allen Clapp, Kevin, and Six Cents & Natalie)
- "Hyde Park" (1993) (split 7-inch with Poastal & Diskothiq, came with Over The Wall fanzine)
- Born Under a Good Sign EP (1993) Standard Recordings
- "She Lives By The Castle" (1993) First Strike (split single with Fluf)
- "Surfing Pointers" (1994) Christmas
- Chimes at Christmas EP (1994) Christmas Further w/ the Summer Hits (split EP with O & Judy and Rodchester)
- Distance EP (1995) Lissy's (double 7-inch)
- The Further John Peel Sessions (1995) Boxing Day
- "I Wanna be a Stranger"/"They said it couldn't happen here...and it didn't" (1996) Kirb Dog
- "The Fakers and the Takers" (1997) Fierce Panda

=== Compilation appearances ===
- "Rich Kids" on Jabberjaw, Good to the Last Drop (1994) Mammoth
- "Pretty Core" on My So Called Life (music from the television series) (1995) Atlantic
- "Insight" on A Means to an End, the Music of Joy Division (1995) Virgin
- "Juniper" on Notes From the Underground Volume 2 (1995) Priority
- "lhs '79 (live)" on KXLU, 88.9FM, Los Angeles, Live, Volume 1 (1995) KXLU
- "Day to Day" on Pop American Style (1996) March
- "Quiet Riot Grrl" on Modern Day Paintings by Original Musical Artists (1997) Fingerpaint
- "The Fakers & The Takers" on Nings and Roundabouts (1999) Fierce Panda
- "I Wanna Be a Stranger" on Songs for Cassavetes (2001) Better Looking
