= Stephen Gardner (transportation executive) =

Transportation executive and musician (b. 1975)

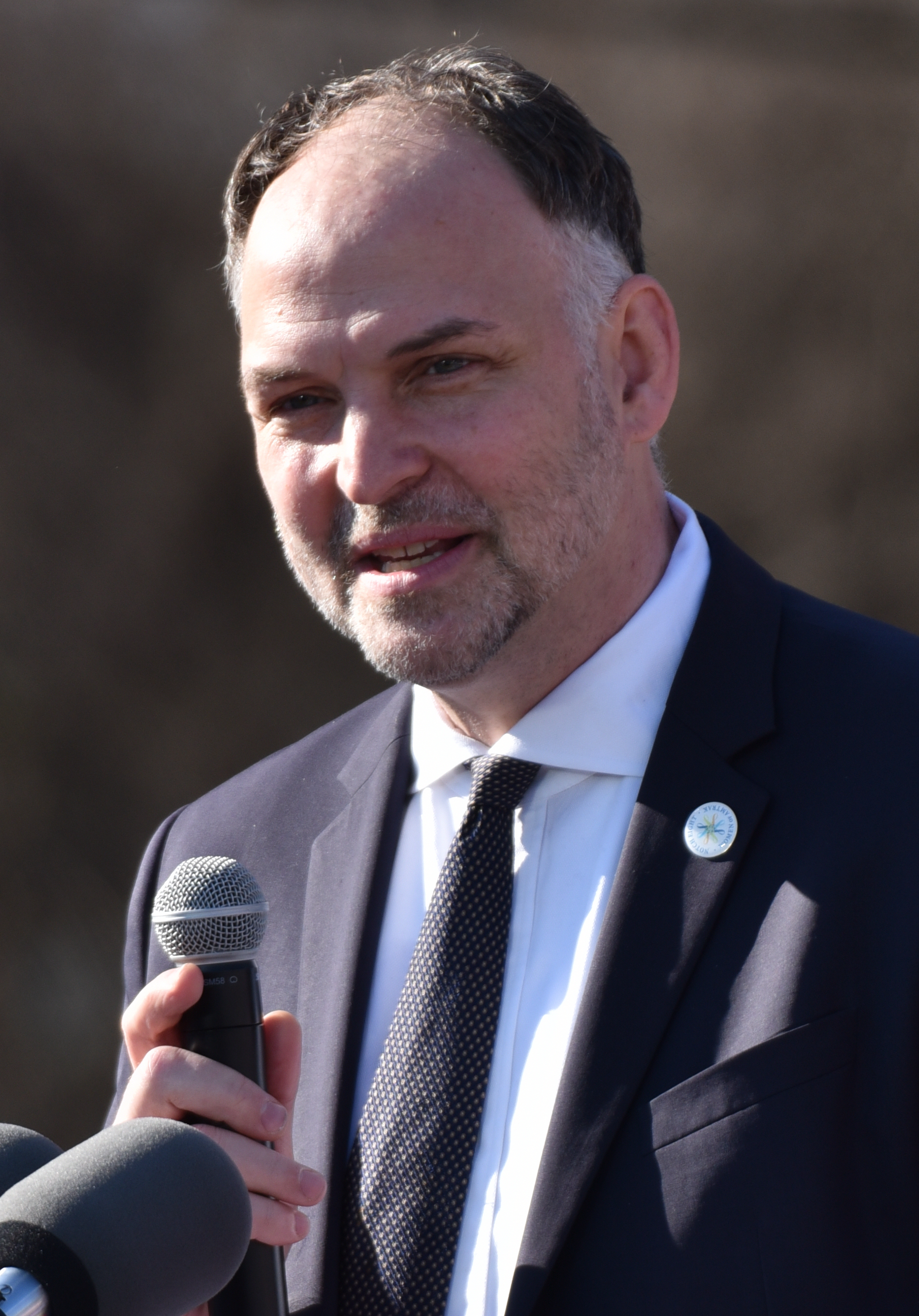
- Gardner in 2023
- Born: December 31, 1975 (age 50); Arlington, Virginia, US
- Education: Hampshire College (BA)
- Known for: Former CEO of Amtrak

Stephen J. Gardner (born December 31, 1975) is an American transportation executive and musician who was chief executive officer of Amtrak from 2022 to 2025.

== Early life and education ==
Gardner was born and raised in Arlington, Virginia. His father was Arlington's county manager.

He went to high school at H-B Woodlawn. As an 18-year-old, he interned for Amtrak at Washington Union Station, measuring train speeds and checking conductor logs.

Gardner attended Hampshire College, studying physics, acoustics, political science, and transportation and graduating with a bachelor of arts.

== Career ==
After college, Gardner moved to Maine to work as a conductor and operations manager for the Maine Central Railroad. In 2001, he began an internship for the House Transportation Subcommittee on Railroads, later working as a legislative assistant and staffer for the Senate Committee on Commerce, Science, and Transportation.

He joined Amtrak in 2009, as its chief operating and commercial officer beginning in May 2019. He was named the organization's president in December 2020.

He became Amtrak's CEO on January 17, 2022, jointly as president and CEO until Roger Harris was named to the former role six months later. He oversaw an infusion of $22 billion in direct federal aid to repair and replace tracks and trains, as well as $44 billion in grants intended to improve U.S. passenger rail service, provided by the Infrastructure Investment and Jobs Act. Among his initial priorities for the new funds was to pay off a $3.4 billion order for 73 additional trains constructed by Siemens Mobility.

The New York Times reported in August 2022 that Gardner had received more than $766,000 in bonuses from Amtrak since 2016.

Gardner testified to the House Transportation and Infrastructure Committee on June 6, 2023 that Amtrak was at least five years from profitability, both because of the COVID-19 pandemic and because it was pursuing capital investments funded by the bipartisan infrastructure law. In September 2023, Gardner advocated to have Amtrak take control of Washington Union Station, noting the organization intended to make station improvements and return its headquarters to the building.

On March 19, 2025, Gardner announced his resignation as Amtrak's CEO, a move made at the direction of the Trump administration.

== Music ==
Gardner became enmeshed in the DC punk scene as a teenager and played bass for the band Lorelei.

In 1994, he formed the experimental music group Chessie, named after the defunct Chesapeake and Ohio Railway. Gardner wrote that the project aimed to explore "the way that railroads bisect the natural world with machinery." Chessie's music employs tape loops featuring guitar and keyboards in addition to recorded samples. Although the band's aesthetic is inspired by railroads, Gardner told the Washington City Paper the band has never sampled a train, because "that's cheating."

The band's debut album "Signal Series" was named Amazon's best Dance and DJ album for 1998.

== Personal life ==
Gardner lives in Philadelphia with his wife and two children.

Business positions
Preceded by William J. Flynn	CEO of Amtrak; 2022–2025
