= Conveyor (band) =

American art rock band

- Origin: Brooklyn, New York, United States
- Genres: Art rock, experimental rock, psychedelic rock, indie rock, experimental pop
- Years active: Since 2011; 15 years ago
- Labels: Paper Garden Records, Gold Robot Records, Like Young Records
- Members: T.J. Masters; Alan Busch; Evan Garfield; Michael Pedron
- Website: conveyormusic.com

Conveyor is an American art rock band from Brooklyn, New York. The band consists of T.J. Masters (vocals, guitar), Alan Busch (vocals, guitar), Evan Garfield (backing vocals, drums), and Michael Pedron (backing vocals, bass).

They have released two full-length albums as well as a number of self-released singles and EPs.

== History ==
The band was formed in early 2011 when its members, who met as musicians in Gainesville, Florida, moved to Brooklyn, New York. They began self-releasing records and performing around New York City in the spring of 2011. Conveyor released their eponymous debut full-length record on Paper Garden Records in 2012.

Conveyor's musical style has been compared to that of Talking Heads and Dirty Projectors, with "a quasi-African lilt that happens to be bent by... odd meters."

The band has recorded live sessions for Grooveshark, Daytrotter and the Bonnaroo Music Festival. It has also been featured on numerous press outlets, including The New York Times, NPR, Filter, The Deli Magazine, and MTV Hive.

== Personnel ==
- T.J. Masters – vocals, guitar
- Alan Busch – vocals, guitar
- Evan Garfield – vocals, drums
- Michael Pedron – vocals, bass

== Discography ==
=== Albums ===
- Conveyor – 2012 (Paper Garden Records)
- Prime – 2014 (Live score for THX1138 performed at Nitehawk Cinema in Brooklyn)
- Ready Not Ready – 2016 (Gold Robot Records)

=== EPs ===
- Sun Ray – 2011 (self-released, limited to 500 copies on orange vinyl)
- Three Carols – 2011 (self-released, limited to 25 copies on purple cassette tape)
- Ani Mag – 2014 (Gold Robot Records)

=== Singles ===
- "This Building Is for Everyone" – 2011 (self-released)
- "Mukraker" – 7", 2012 (self-released, limited to 500 copies on clear vinyl)
- "Mane" – 7", 2012 (Gold Robot Records, limited to 500 copies on white vinyl)
- "Mammal Food / Pushups" – 7", 2013 (Gold Robot Records, limited to 250 copies on gold vinyl)

== See also ==
- List of alternative rock artists
- List of bands formed in New York
- List of experimental musicians
- List of indie rock musicians
