= The Heartfelt =

Studio album by Figurine
- Released: September 2001
- Genre: Electropop
- Length: 41:29
- Label: March Records
- Producer: David Figurine, James Figurine

Figurine chronology
Transportation + Communication = Love (1999)	The Heartfelt (2001)	Discard (EP) (2002)

Professional ratings
Review scores
Source	Rating
AllMusic	3/5 stars
Pitchfork Media	(6.0/10)
Tiny Mix Tapes	3/5 stars

The Heartfelt is an album by Figurine, released in 2001. It was re-released in 2005.

== Critical reception ==
Tiny Mix Tapes wrote that "there is little room to breathe, as we are continually fed the same staccato synth noises, coated with extra sugar and a side of jellybeans." The East Bay Express called the album "a post-Kid A masterpiece of wistful futurism and powerfully minimalist programmed beats."

== Track listing ==
1. "International Space Station II" – 3:48
2. "IMpossible" – 4:10
3. "Pswd:stdum" – 1:28
4. "Rewind" – 4:04
5. "Way Too Good" – 2:12
6. "Stranger" – 5:01
7. "Time" (His mix) – 2:09
8. "Instrumental" – 4:02
9. "Pswd:natur" – 1:29
10. "Our Game (Is Over)" – 6:14
11. "So Futuristic" – 2:08
12. "Pswd:pttrn" – 1:27
13. "Heartfelt" – 5:08
14. "Let's Make Our Love Song" – 4:20
15. "[Untitled]" - 2:31
