= Steve Gardner =

Steve Gardner is the name of:

- Steve Gardner (footballer, born 1958), English professional footballer who played as a midfielder for Ipswich Town, Oldham Athletic, Karlskrona, IFK Göteborg, the Dallas Sidekicks and GAIS
- Steve Gardner (footballer, born 1968), English professional footballer who played as a defender for Manchester United, Burnley, Bradford City and Bury
