= Chessie (band) =

American experimental music group

Chessie is an American experimental music group consisting of Stephen Gardner and Ben Bailes.

Gardner started Chessie in 1994, while he was a member of the Washington, D.C. post-rock band Lorelei. His first full-length as Chessie, Signal Series, was issued in 1998 and was named Best Dance and DJ Album that year by Amazon.com. In 2000 Gardner was joined by Bailes and they have since worked as a duo. While Overnight received critical acclaim and a spot on a New York Times music critic's best-of-2001 list, a follow-up record did not materialize until 2008, when the group released Manifest on Plug Research. The repetitive nature of their music is inspired by trains and railroads.

Gardner was CEO of Amtrak from 2022 to 2025.

== Musical style ==
Reviewing Signal Series, M. Tye Comer of CMJ New Music Monthly considered Chessie a product of the closing gap between post-rock and experimental electronica in the late 1990s. He noted that the album was a sound collage with raw loops and influences from dub music and drum and bass.

== Discography ==
=== Albums ===
- Signal Series (Drop Beat Records, 1998)
- Meet (Drop Beat, 1999)
- Overnight (Plug Research, 2001)
- Manifest (Plug Research, 2008)

=== EPs and collaborations ===
- Approach Limited 7", 1996
- Lost, Not Found 10", 2000
- Alpha-Arvonia DVD&CD (with Colby Caldwell), 2004
- Suburban Shore (as Camping, with Henning Fritzenwalder), 2004
- Dual Mode EP, 2006
