= Take It Easy (Love Nothing) =

Single by Bright Eyes

from the album Digital Ash in a Digital Urn
- Released: October 26, 2004
- Length: 10:52
- Label: Saddle Creek LBJ-69
- Songwriter(s): Conor Oberst
- Producer(s): Mike Mogis

Bright Eyes singles chronology
"Lua" (2004)	"Take It Easy (Love Nothing)" (2004)	"When the President Talks to God" (2005)

"Take It Easy (Love Nothing)" is a single by Bright Eyes, released in October 2004. It, along with "Lua", took the top two spots on Billboard magazine's Hot Singles Sales chart, something that had not been accomplished by one artist since 1997. The title song appears on the 2005 album, Digital Ash in a Digital Urn.

The single is the 69th release of Saddle Creek Records.

== Track listing ==
1. "Take It Easy (Love Nothing)" (Conor Oberst) – 3:24
2. "Burn Rubber" (Simon Joyner) – 2:43
3. "Cremation" (Oberst) – 4:45

== Personnel ==
- Jason Boesel – drums, car doors, percussion (1–3)
- Clay Leverett – car doors, percussion (2–3)
- Mike Mogis – guitar, banjo, dobro, keyboards, bass, Wurlitzer (1–3)
- Conor Oberst – guitar, baritone, bass, keyboards, Wurlitzer, voice (1–3)
- Jimmy Tamborello – drum program (1)
- Digital Audio Engine – drum programming (1–3)
