= Human Voice (album) =

Studio album by Dntel
- Released: September 23, 2014
- Label: Leaving Records

Dntel chronology
Aimlessness (2012)	Human Voice (2014)

Human Voice is an album by Dntel, released on September 23, 2014. It is Dntel's first LP under the Leaving Records label.

== Sound ==
The sound of Human Voice is less lyrical and vocal than his past albums, with emphasis on the warping of human voices and use of synths instead of acoustic arrangements. The first vocalized synth that appears in the album happens to be that of the Casio SK-1 preset that shares the name with the album.

== Reception ==
Professional ratings
Aggregate scores
Source	Rating
Metacritic	80/100
Review scores
Source	Rating
AllMusic	4/5 stars
Pitchfork	(6.8/10)
PopMatters	7/10 stars

Human Voice received positive reviews from critics. On Metacritic, the album holds a score of 80/100 based on 4 reviews, indicating "generally favorable reviews".

== Track listing ==
1. "Human Voice"
2. "Fringes of Focus (instrumental)"
3. "If I Stay a Minute"
4. "Bike Path"
5. "Foraya"
6. "Connections"
7. "Bay Loop"
8. "Ashby"
