= Easy/Lucky/Free =

Single by Bright Eyes

from the album Digital Ash in a Digital Urn
- Released: July 25, 2005
- Recorded: 2004
- Genre: Indie rock, electronica
- Label: Saddle Creek SCE-79
- Songwriter: Conor Oberst

Bright Eyes singles chronology
"First Day of My Life" (2005)	"Easy/Lucky/Free" (2005)	"Hot Knives" (2007)

"Easy/Lucky/Free" is a single by the band Bright Eyes from their album Digital Ash in a Digital Urn. It was released July 25, 2005. The music video features Conor Oberst entering a room, and then writing the lyrics and drawings on a transparent wall as the song plays. "Easy/Lucky/Free" is featured in the 2008 Mexican film Voy a Explotar.

== Track listing ==
1. "Easy/Lucky/Free" - Radio Edit
2. "Gold Mine Gutted"
3. "Gold Mine Gutted" - Her Space Holiday Mix (packaging incorrectly lists "Easy/Lucky/Free" - Her Space Holiday Mix)

== Official versions ==
1. Album Version 5:32
2. Radio Edit 4:35
3. James Figurine Remix 4:48
4. Danger Mouse Remix 3:37
5. Dawes Cover 5:25
