= Lua (song) =

Single by Bright Eyes

from the album I'm Wide Awake, It's Morning
- Released: October 26, 2004
- Recorded: February 2004
- Genre: Indie folk
- Length: 4:32
- Label: Saddle Creek LBJ-68
- Songwriter(s): Conor Oberst
- Producer(s): Mike Mogis

Bright Eyes singles chronology
| "Lover I Don't Have to Love" (2002) | "Lua" (2004) | "Take It Easy (Love Nothing)" (2004) |

"Lua" is a single by Bright Eyes released in October 2004. Appearing on the album, I'm Wide Awake, It's Morning, the song deals with two people as they struggle through depression, addiction, and an interminable night. Conor Oberst appears alone on the track, on vocals and acoustic guitar.

The song also appears as a duet with Gillian Welch on the album Dark Was the Night. "Lua" was on number 89 of Rolling Stone's "100 Best Songs of the 2000s". The song was also featured in the 2015 video game Life Is Strange and the 2021 documentary Can't Get You Out of My Head.

== Track listing ==
All songs by Conor Oberst, except where noted.

1. "Lua" - 4:32
2. "Well Whiskey" - 4:11
3. "I Woke Up with This Song in My Head This Morning" (Alex McManus) - 3:55
4. "True Blue" - 3:30

== Other appearances ==
- Acoustic 07 (2007, V2 Records)
- Dark Was the Night (2009, Red Hot)

== Personnel ==
- Conor Oberst - guitar and voice on all tracks, track 4 including keyboards and piano
- Jason Boesel - drums on tracks 2 and 3
- Sean Cole - harmonica on track 2
- Tim Luntzel - bass on track 2
- Alex McManus - guitar and voice on tracks 2 and 3
- Mike Mogis - banjo on track 2, pedal steel on track 3
- Nick White - organ on track 2
- Nate Walcott - trumpet on track 3
- Matt Maginn - bass on track 3
