= Conveyance =

Conveyance may refer to:

- Conveyance, the documentation of the transfer of ownership of land from one party to another—see conveyancing
- Public conveyance, a shared passenger transportation service
- A means of transport
- Water conveyance, a commuter passenger boat used to provide public transport
- Conveyance (horse), an American Thoroughbred racehorse

== See also ==
- Conveyancer
- Conveyor (disambiguation)
- Vehicle
