= Dumb Luck (album) =

Studio album by Dntel
- Released: April 24, 2007
- Recorded: 2002–2006
- Genre: Electronic
- Length: 41:20
- Label: Sub Pop

Dntel chronology
Life Is Full of Possibilities (2001)	Dumb Luck (2007)	Early Works for Me If It Works for You II (2009)

Singles from Dumb Luck
- 1. "The Distance" Released: 2007

Professional ratings
Aggregate scores
Source	Rating
Metacritic	60/100
Review scores
Source	Rating
AllMusic	4/5 stars
The A.V. Club	B
Pitchfork	6.8/10
PopMatters	5/10 stars
Slant Magazine	2/5 stars

Dumb Luck is the fourth studio album by American electronic music artist Dntel. It was released through Sub Pop on April 24, 2007. Recorded between 2002 and 2006, it includes vocal contributions from Ed Droste (Grizzly Bear), Valerie Trebeljahr and Markus Acher (Lali Puna), Jenny Lewis (Rilo Kiley), Grant Olsen and Sonya Westcott (Arthur & Yu), Mia Doi Todd, Andrew Broder (Fog), Conor Oberst (Bright Eyes), and Christopher and Jennifer Gunst (Mystic Chords of Memory).

== Critical reception ==
At Metacritic, which assigns a weighted average score out of 100 to reviews from mainstream critics, Dumb Luck received an average score of 60% based on 22 reviews, indicating "mixed or average reviews".

Jimmy Newlin of Slant Magazine gave the album 2 stars out of 5 and called it "a work that is genuinely, though only sporadically, beautiful, but no less emotionally dull." Jason Crock of Pitchfork gave the album a 6.8 out of 10 and commented that "While some of the album's songs are terrifically cloying, I can't call it a disappointment; it's more a case of diminishing returns."

== Track listing ==
No.	Title	Length
1.	"Dumb Luck"	5:20
2.	"To a Fault"	6:32
3.	"I'd Like to Know"	3:47
4.	"Roll On"	3:40
5.	"The Distance"	4:05
6.	"Rock My Boat"	3:52
7.	"Natural Resources"	4:38
8.	"Breakfast in Bed"	3:52
9.	"Dreams"	5:34

UK edition bonus track
No.	Title	Length
10.	"Everything's Tricks"	4:08

iTunes edition bonus tracks
No.	Title	Length
10.	"Rock My Boat (Roger O'Donnell Mix)"	3:29
11.	"Natural Resources (Gudrun Gut's Natural Mix)"	4:58

== Charts ==
Chart	Peak position
US Top Dance/Electronic Albums (Billboard)	7
US Heatseekers Albums (Billboard)	28
