= Brent Rademaker =

American musician

Brent Rademaker is a musician, formerly of The Tyde and Beachwood Sparks.

He was also in Frausdots, a band with Michelle Loiselle, a former backing singer for Guns N' Roses, Carl Tapia, Roger Brogan, Exiquio Talavera and David Baum. Their debut album, Couture, Couture, Couture, features guest appearances from Roger O'Donnell of The Cure, Rob Campanella and Hunter Crowley of Brian Jonestown Massacre and Mia Doi Todd. Rademaker also fronts the band GospelbeacH.

== Albums ==
=== With Frausdots ===
- Couture, Couture, Couture (Subpop, 2004)

=== With GospelbeacH ===
- Pacific Surf Line (Alive Naturalsound, 2015)
- Another Summer of Love (Alive Naturalsound, 2017)
- Another Winter Alive (Alive Naturalsound, 2018)
- Let It Burn (Alive Naturalsound, 2019)
