= Reconfigurine =

Remix album by Figurine
- Released: 2002
- Length: 69:10

Figurine chronology
Discard (EP) (2002)	Reconfigurine (2002)

Professional ratings
Review scores
Source	Rating
Allmusic	link

Reconfigurine is a remix album by Figurine, released in 2002.

== Track listing ==
1. "F>I>G>U>R>I>N>E> (Reconfigurine Theme)" (Figurine remix) – 1:02
2. "I Wait for You (By the Telephone)" (Pacifica remix) – 2:58
3. "Eurodiscoteque" (Technicolor remix) – 4:45
4. "My First UFO" (ckid remix) – 1:49
5. "You" (David Figurine remix) – 3:53
6. "Tired Eyes" (DJ Blank remix) – 4:15
7. "International Space Station" (David Figurine remix) – 5:48
8. "City 2 City" – 4:25
9. "S.O.S." (Double Agent remix) – 3:24
10. "Batteries (Can't Help Me Now)" (Mall remix) – 4:26
11. "The European Beauty" (Phasmid remix) – 3:48
12. "Robots 2002" (Figurine remix) – 2:28
13. "New Mate" (Steward remix) – 2:45
14. "New Millennium Song" (Flowchart remix) – 6:55
15. "An Electronic Address" (Printed Circuit remix) – 4:08
16. "Digits" (Accelera Deck remix) – 12:08
17. Untitled – 0:13
