= Make the Cowboy Robots Cry =

EP by Beachwood Sparks
- Released: 2002
- Recorded: Slogan Studios
- Genre: Alt-country
- Length: 28:42
- Label: Sub Pop
- Producer: Scott Hackwith, Jimmy Tamborello

Beachwood Sparks chronology
Once We Were Trees (2001)	Make the Cowboy Robots Cry (2002)	The Tarnished Gold (2012)

Professional ratings
Review scores
Source	Rating
AllMusic	3/5 stars
Robert Christgau	(dud)
Hour Community	3/5 stars
Pitchfork Media	2.6/10
Stylus Magazine	C

Make the Cowboy Robots Cry is an EP by American alt-country band Beachwood Sparks, released in 2002, which featured the return of drummer Jimi Hey.

== Track listing ==
1. "Drinkswater" – 7:12
2. "Hibernation" – 3:27
3. "Ponce de Leon Blues" – 6:55
4. "Sing Your Thoughts" – 3:52
5. "Galapagos" – 4:17
6. "Ghost Dance 1492" – 2:58
