= Figurine (band) =

American electronica band

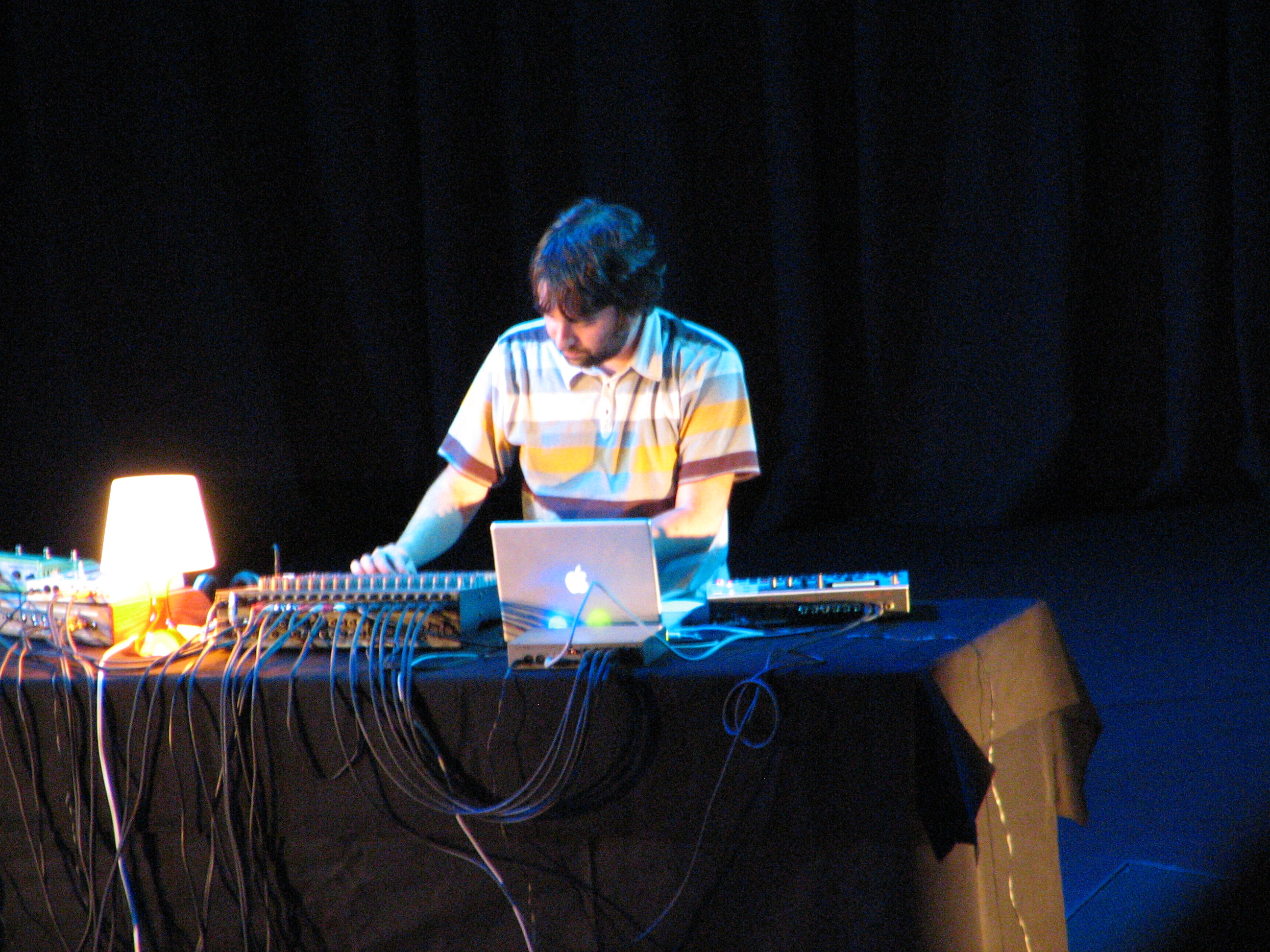

Background information
- Origin: Santa Barbara, California
- Genres: Indietronica, trip hop
- Years active: 1994–present
- Labels: BlackBean & Placenta Tape Club, March Records
- Members: David Figurine; James Figurine; Meredith Figurine
- Website: www.forsterdavid.org/figurine/

Figurine is an American electronic music group. The band members, friends since high school, use the pseudonyms David Figurine (Forster David Rudolph), James Figurine (James Tamborello) and Meredith Figurine (Meredith Landman).

While the band seems to be inactive as of 2006, all three members are also involved in other bands or have released solo work under their respective Figurine monikers. Mainly a long distance collaboration, the band was a precursor to James Figurine/Tamborello's later, more commercially successful project The Postal Service. Tamborello has also used the Figurine pseudonym for an official remix of Bright Eyes' Easy/Lucky/Free in 2005 and a solo album in 2006. Meredith is also a vocalist for Boothby.

Figurine lyrics commonly tell whimsical love stories involving technology, such as space stations, instant messaging or internet cafes. Musical influences have included Kraftwerk, Orchestral Manoeuvres in the Dark, The Human League, and The Postal Service. Their song "New Mate" was featured on the soundtrack of the 2004 cult film Napoleon Dynamite.

== Discography ==
=== Albums ===
- Transportation + Communication = Love (1999, re-released in 2002)
- The Heartfelt (2001, re-released in 2005)
- Reconfigurine (2002) - remix album

=== EPs ===
- Discard EP (2002)

=== Singles ===
- "I Wait for You (By the Telephone)" (1998)
- "Zero Degrees" (2000)
- "IMpossible" (2001)

=== Other releases ===
- Split LP - James Figurine vs. David Figurine (2001) - solo material by James Figurine and David Figurine
- Mistake Mistake Mistake Mistake (2006) - James Figurine solo album

- "Virtual Reality Suit (Outtake #1)" (1999), Dead Turtle Records
