= Roommate (band) =

Roommate is a band from Chicago, IL.

== History ==
Roommate began as a solo music project of Kent Lambert in 2000. He had just moved from Iowa City to Brooklyn and started recording music in his apartment. In 2001, he relocated to Chicago and self-released the Celebs EP. In 2004, Roommate re-emerged as a live band. Work on the full-length Songs the Animals Taught Us began soon thereafter, and the album was self-released in the summer of 2005. A wide release on the Plug Research label followed in the spring of 2006 and was supported with a European tour and a few shows around the United States. Production on the New Steam EP began in late 2006 and the band recorded steadily through the completion of its second full-length album. We Were Enchanted was released in April 2008 on Plug Research and Shrug Records and supported with shows in the Netherlands and the American Midwest.

For several years members of the live band changed based on availability, playing instruments such as musical saw, banjo, violin, theremin, Buchla Music Box, and bassoon, as well as hand percussion and traditional rock instruments. In recent years the band has stabilized into a quartet of Lambert, Gillian Lisée (Fruit Bats, Califone), Seth Vanek (Tiny Cover Band, THIN HYMNS), and Sam Wagster (Cairo Gang, The Father Costume, Fruit Bats). Roommate's third album Guilty Rainbow was released on the Chicago's Antephonic label in the spring of 2011. Tours through the Eastern and West Coast United States followed shortly after. Guilty Rainbow won praise from music writers such as Collin Anderson of Tiny Mix Tapes, who called it "one of those rare albums that starts out great and gets better." The band's fourth album MAKE LIKE was released by Chicago's Strange Weather Records on June 23, 2015.

== Members ==
The current lineup includes:

- Kent Lambert (Keytar, vocals, electronics)
- Gillian Lisée (bass), vocals
- Luther Rochester (Buchla Music Easel, bells, vibes, Moog, melodica)
- Seth Vanek (drums, percussion)
- Sam Wagster (Guitar)

Occasional and past participants include Gerard Barreto (bass/sound engineering), Nick Broste (trombone, sound engineering), Amy Cimini (viola), Reid Coker (guitar), Tim Daisy (drums), Devin Davis (drums, theremin), Erica Dicker (violin), Jim Duffy (drums), Tom Comerford (guitar), Anton Hatwich (bass), Cody Hennesy (guitar, programming), Mercedes Landazuri (banjo), Justin Petertil (guitar), Daniel Schneider (guitar), Dewayne Slightweight aka Lee Relvas (bells, vocals), Evelyn Weston (musical saw), and Katherine Young (bassoon). During a short tour in The Netherlands in May 2008, Lambert performed as Roommate with a Netherlands-based backing band of Bart de Kroon (guitar, banjo, Moog), Melvin Wevers (bass) and Sebastiaan Janssen (drums) from Dutch singer Pien Feith's band.

== Discography ==
- Celebs EP, CD, self-released (December 2001, re-released with modified artwork by Fresh Produce in February 2006)
- "Duyster", various artists compilation, 2 x CD, Play it Again Sam (March 2005, released for the fifth anniversary of the Belgian radio program Duyster; Roommate's "RP (Forget the metaphors)" was selected for disc one, "Duyster.Classics")
- Songs the Animals Taught Us, CD, self-released (July 2005, re-released with modified artwork by Plug Research in April 2006)
- New Steam EP, Plug Research - download only (February 2007)
- New Steam EP, 10" vinyl on Shrug Records (June 2007)
- We Were Enchanted CD, Plug Research (April 2008)
- We Were Enchanted vinyl LP, Shrug Records (April 2008)
- Guilty Rainbow digital/vinyl, Antephonic Records (March 2011)
