= Transportation + Communication = Love =

Studio album by Figurine
- Released: December 14, 1999
- Genre: Indietronica
- Length: 63:23
- Label: BlackBean & Placenta Tape Club
- Producer: Tim Delage

Figurine chronology
Transportation + Communication = Love (1999)	The Heartfelt (2001)

Professional ratings
Review scores
Source	Rating
AllMusic	3/5 stars

Transportation + Communication = Love is the debut album by American electronic band Figurine, released in 1999 then re-released in 2002 under the BlackBean & Placenta Tape Club record label. It includes twenty tracks.

== Track listing ==
1. "I Wait for You (By the Telephone)" – 3:26
2. "F>I>G>U>R>I>N>E" – 1:10
3. "New Mate" – 4:14
4. "An Electronic Address" – 4:09
5. "S.O.S." – 4:59
6. "Batteries (Can't Help Me Now)" – 2:55
7. "Robots" – 1:06
8. "My First UFO" – 3:33
9. "The European Beauty" – 4:13
10. "Tired Eyes" – 3:55
11. "Digits" – 3:18
12. "Eurodiscoteque" – 3:34
13. "New Millennium Song" – 3:42
14. "International Space Station" – 3:06
15. "Lifelike" (hidden track) – 2:50
16. "You" (recorded Live in Berlin) – 2:20

=== Bonus tracks on 2002 reissue ===
17. "S...p...a...c...e" – 2:00
18. "Zero Degrees" – 4:42
19. "Our Song" – 4:04
20. "?"
