= KXLU =

Radio station at Loyola Marymount University

- Los Angeles, California; United States
- Frequency: 88.9 MHz

Programming
- Format: Eclectic

Ownership
- Owner: Loyola Marymount University

History
- First air date: 1957

Technical information
- Licensing authority: FCC
- Facility ID: 38938
- Class: A
- ERP: 2,900 watts
- HAAT: 3.0 meters (9.8 ft)
- Transmitter coordinates: 33°58′16″N 118°24′56″W

Links
- Public license information: Public file; LMS
- Webcast: Listen live
- Website: kxlu.com

KXLU (88.9 FM) is a non-commercial, free-form, college and community radio station broadcasting out of Loyola Marymount University in southwest Los Angeles, California.

It debuted on the air in 1957 and celebrated its 50th anniversary in 2007. The station plays many styles of music, broadly classified under rock, specialty, fine arts, alternative, and Latin jazz. KXLU has a small, cult following among music fans in the general Los Angeles metropolitan area. The station's rock programming runs between 2 a.m. and 6 p.m. on weekdays, and the hosts during this time are predominantly college students. Specialty shows include "Stray Pop" hosted by Stella, "Music For Nimrods" hosted by Reverend Dan, "She Rocks" hosted by McAllister, Biancadonk, and Cass Monster, "In A Dream" hosted by Mystic Pete, "The Bomb Shelter" hosted by Uncle Tim, "Livation" hosted by Robert Douglas and Hilary Russell, "The Molotov Cocktail Hour" hosted by Cyrano & Señor Amor, "The Windmills of Your Mind" hosted by Taylor 2000, "Neuz Pollution" hosted by Chris Candy and Maki, "Demolisten" hosted by Fred and Sean Carnage, "A Fistful Of Vinyl" hosted by Alec and Brett, and "Center Stage" hosted by Mark Gordon, among other programs. There is also a public affairs program called "Echo in the Sense". The weekend Latin jazz block "Alma del Barrio" has been on the air since 1973, with longtime host Eddie Lopez curating the program for over 40 years.

The current General Manager is Brendan Baehr, the current Program Director is Isa Johnson, and the current Music Director is Sam Takano.

== Demolisten history ==
Demolisten has been a weekly show on KXLU since 1984, which only plays demos from unsigned acts. It is credited with introducing numerous acts to the public.

The show began in 1984 when "DJ Agent Ava" took a couple reel-to-reel tapes of Jane's Addiction and Faith No More, and decided to start a radio show of nothing but demo tapes. Once word got out about the show, she soon acquired demos from Red Hot Chili Peppers, Guns N' Roses, The Jesus and Mary Chain and others.

Perry Farrell, in the book Whores: An Oral Biography of Perry Farrell and Jane's Addiction said, "The cool thing about KXLU's Demolisten show was if you were a local band you could just call in, request your song and if you went down there, they would interview you... I was listening to KXLU all day long because that's where all the good music was. The rest of the world was out of it."

The early 1990s DJs featured Fred Kiko, Chad, and Tony Kiewel. They've often been credited with the discovery of Beck, who donated a track to the Demolisten: Volume 2 CD, and also played music by Jimmy Tamborello (The Postal Service, Dntel), who was a friend and fellow KXLU DJ at the time.

Tony Kiewel left the show for an A&R position at Sub Pop Records in 2000.

The early 2000s continued to feature Fred, with Devin Valdesuso and Doug Jones (label owner of Kittridge Records).

Hosts have included the International Voice of Reason AKA IVOR, and others.

In 2002, Fred was joined by co-host Octavius Poirier (former guitarist for Artichoke and Chewing Foil). Audio archives of KXLU Demolisten have been saved online since 2003.

In 2011 and 2012, Demolisten was hosted by Fred and Sean Carnage of Sean Carnage Monday Nights @ Pehrspace in Historic Filipino Town in Echo Park.

Since 2013, Fred has been hosting the show on his own. In 2013, Demolisten started hosting live shows at Time Warp Music in Mar Vista.

=== Interviews and reviews ===
The members of KXLU Demolisten were on a TV show in Canada where they were interviewed by Laurie Pike circa 1995. There is a writeup of the show in LA Weekly Feb. 24, 1998. They were nominated as best radio show in Los Angeles by the LA Weekly: published June 2, 1999. They were mentioned in Slate Magazine as an influence on the author's music taste on Nov. 29, 2004. Also mentioned in The Los Angeles Alternative, an independent newspaper, when KXLU won one of the top 5 radio stations in the city in the people's choice awards: Published June 30, 2006. Demolisten was featured in an independent film, Destroy the Rocker, about the Los Angeles music scene. Music for Nimrods received a write-up in OC Weekly in 1997.

== See also ==
- College radio
- List of college radio stations in the United States
