= Pictoplasma =

Pictoplasma is an organisation dedicated to the art of character design, and are notable for bringing it into the mainstream. Since 1999, they have encouraged the international character design scene by publishing collections of characters, organising character design conferences and by maintaining the Pictoplasma Archives, an extensive inventory, collection and showcase of contemporary character design.
