= Plug Research =

American independent record label

Plug Research is an independent record label, based in Los Angeles, California, US. Created by Allen Avanessian in 1994, the label specialized in IDM, folktronica and experimental music.

The label began with young artists that have made its reputation, such as Exile, Bilal, Flying Lotus, Daedelus, and Dntel. Today he continues his new selection of quality artists like Tensei, Shortcircles or Astrobal. Andrew Lojero was Senior A&R Director and Executive Producer for Plug Research from 2008 to 2012.

== Artists ==
- Adult Karate
- Adventure Time
- Amp Live
- Anthony Valadez
- Astrobal
- Bilal
- Chessie
- Daedelus
- Damon Aaron
- Dntel
- Jeremy Dower
- Flying Lotus
- Headset
- John Tejada
- Shafiq Husayn
- Meanest Man Contest
- Mia Doi Todd
- Milosh
- Nobody
- Naytronix
- Om'Mas Keith
- Roommate
- SONNYMOON
- Sene
- Soulo
- Thomas Fehlmann
- The Woods

== See also ==
- List of record labels
- List of electronic music record labels
