= Kreidler (band) =

German electronic band

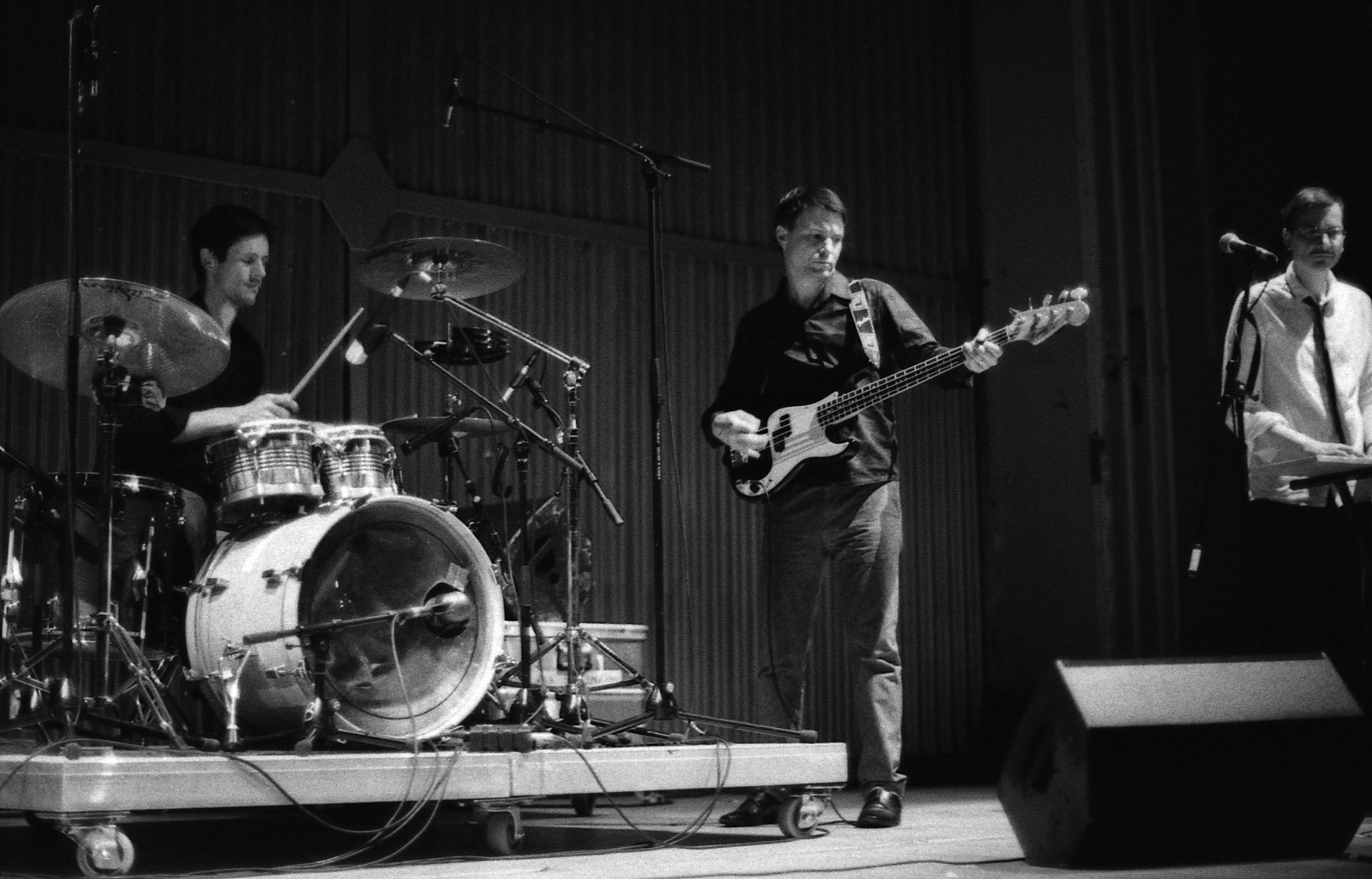
- In performance, 2009

Background information
- Origin: Düsseldorf, Germany
- Genres: Electronic, pop, krautrock
- Years active: 1994–present
- Labels: En Contresens, Stewardess, Finlayson, Captain Trip Records, Mute, KiffSM, Wonder, italic, Bureau-B
- Members: Thomas Klein; Alexander Paulick; Andreas Reihse
- Past members: Stefan Schneider; Detlef Weinrich
- Website: www.ikreidler.de

Kreidler is a German band from Düsseldorf, which was founded in 1994. The band combines electronic and analog instruments, and is categorized by critics, depending on the publication, as electronic music, pop, avant-garde, post rock, IDM, ambient, neoclassical, krautrock, or electronica.

Kreidler was the inscription on a T-shirt worn by Andreas Reihse on the day when the band Deux Baleines Blanches sought a new name. It was subsequently interpreted as a kind of anagram for Klein, Reihse, Schneider, Weinrich.

== Band history ==
=== The early period ===
In 1993, Andreas Reihse and Stefan Schneider from the Düsseldorf band Deux Baleines Blanches (Klein, Reihse, Schneider), along with Cor Gout of the band Trespassers W from The Hague, initiated the project Punt.(punkt)., a German-Dutch collaboration against the increase in right-wing populism and right-wing extremism in both countries. They organized concerts, staged readings and released a single and a newspaper that deals with forms and possibilities of artistic (musical) intervention in politics (including contributions from: Anarchist Academy, Attila the Stockbroker, F.W. Bernstein, Philip Elston, BüroBert, Dr. Ralf Bohn, Günther Jacob & Wohlfahrtsausschuss Hamburg, Erinna König, Didi de Paris, Mayo Thompson, Andrea Zeitler et al.).

In the spring of 1994, they organized a spoken word evening in Düsseldorf with Celestine Raalte, Eddie Kagie, Attila the Stockbroker, Harald Sack Ziegler, Willem Jacobs and Cor Gout. There they were approached by the poet Stan Lafleur regarding the possibility of doing a concert together. Detlef Weinrich they knew as a student in the class of Professor Magdalena Jetelová at Kunstakademie Düsseldorf was deejaying on the same day under the name DJ Sport–during the 'Rundgang', the yearly presentation of the works of the art students.

The first appearance of Kreidler feat. DJ Sport (with Stan Lafleur) was held on 29 March 1994 at a bar in Düsseldorf's old town.

=== 1994–1996 ===
Kreidler's first year was marked by the contemplation and exploration of spoken word poetry. The band played instrumental music that was influenced by dub and electronica, but also by the 'Düsseldorf Schools' of the 1970s (Kraftwerk, NEU!, la Düsseldorf) and the early 80s (new wave, Neue Deutsche Welle, Ratinger Hof). Their first album Riva was released in the summer of 1994 on the French label A Contresens. While half of the pieces on Riva featured (spoken) lyrics, its successor, recorded in the spring of 1995 at Matthias Arfmann''s studio in Hamburg, was purely instrumental. The seven-song untitled mini-album was released by the Cologne label Finlayson.

With this record, Kreidler were compared in the press to the Chicago post-rock school based around Tortoise on one hand, and on the other hand a suggested revival of Krautrock. This was due to their combination of analog and digital instruments and sounds–considered remarkable at the time – and the fact that, live, the band construct their pieces around variable patterns and vary them. More clearly rooted in each of these worlds were the side projects of the individual members: since 1996, Reihse and at times Klein had been working with Kraftwerk, NEU!, La Düsseldorf mastermind Klaus Dinger in the formation la!NEU?, while Schneider explored the possibilities of Post Rock with To Rococo Rot. Kreidler's next release, the single Kookaï, was a surprisingly melodic song, which reminded Spex magazine of "night rides through downtown Dusseldorf and the effect of deserted shopping districts."

=== 1996 ===
In autumn of 1996, the label KiffSM released the Kreidler album Weekend. With this record they were chosen by the readers of Spex in the 1996 readers' poll as Newcomer of the Year: "it is particularly the homogeneity of resources, the flexibility of the structures and the development of the album that make 'Weekend' a pleasant weekend in its own right.". Die Zeit wrote "avant-garde that is fun right away." The album also received good reviews internationally. Particularly, other musicians showed their appreciation for the band, among them David Bowie, Arto Lindsay, Momus, Ken Ishi, Pavement, Stereolab, and Nicolette.

=== 1997 ===
In 1997, the success of Weekend led the band on a tour of France and to their first appearances in London. Afterwards they released the EP Fechterin, which was named Single of the Week in the Melody Maker: "The three songs are the most precise exercises in exponential electronics I've heard since Kraftwerk's Hall of mirrors, and just as danceable". The same month, the EP Resport appeared on the Stewardess label, with remixes by Pyrolator, Erik (MMM), L@n and Robert Lippok.

=== 1998–1999 ===
Kreidler produced their followup to Weekend in the studio of Mouse on Mars. The album, Appearance and The Park, was released in May 1998. According to interviews of the band one of the main aesthetic ideas of the album was to make it clear that the band members grew up with (Anglo-American) new wave, and not with the German rock music of the 1970s. Even the cover art appears cool, model-like, synthetic, while the 'Park' in the title refers to the park photography of the previous album's cover. The Roland Juno synthesizer can clearly be heard as a lead instrument in the tracks, the bass lines are reminiscent of music from the Factory label, sound effects recall post punk and sequencers suggest the Synthpop of the 1980s. The first single, Au Pair, combines these elements in an epic pop anthem. The video (directed by Sebastian Kutscher) for the track was awarded second place at the video awards of the International Short Film Festival Oberhausen in 1999.

Summer of 1998 saw the release of the EP Coldness, which was the first Kreidler piece with vocals since 1994. Remixes came from Shantel and Daniel Miller, the founder of Mute Records and producer of Depeche Mode, who had met the band at their first appearances in London in 1997. He then mixed them a piece of Synthpop. Forced Exposure in the U.S. wrote: "Kreidler's most outlandlishly accessible moment, in a synth-electro style that is totally captivating." Later that year the band went on their first festival tour, including performances in Brighton (The Fringe) and Roskilde. At the end of 1998 Kreidler and Stefan Schneider went their separate ways, with Schneider focussing on his former side-project To Rococo Rot. The band found support on bass in Alex Paulick, the songwriter of Coloma. In the spring of 1999 they toured with this lineup in Great Britain and, with Tarwater, through France and Switzerland. Later that year, Kreidler separated from the record company Play It Again Sam in a (legal) dispute following the departure of their A&R and Kiffsm label manager Jutta Bächner.

=== 2000–2001 ===
In 1999, the band had taken a room in an abandoned post office building behind Düsseldorf Hauptbahnhof, the central train station in Düsseldorf, near Kling Klang Studio, as part of the Innenstadt Mainstream e.V., their artist and musician association, which also included the project space for electronic music EGO, the artist collective hobbypopMUSEUM, the musicians L@N, Antonelli Electr., The Bad Examples as well as Background Records. In early 2000 they began setting up their studios there for the recording of a new album. The eponymous Kreidler album appeared on Jutta Bächner's newly founded Wonder label. The music sounded cleaner, more digital, but with a warmth that was clearly different from the model-like coldness of the previous album. The song writing was also more defined, with the pieces on Kreidler featuring clear, pop song-like structures. Three songs featured voice/vocals, one with the British musician Momus and another with Argentinean Leo Garcia: "The group's work has never sounded this realized" wrote Jason Birchmeier, Allmusic.

In February 2001, Kreidler played for the first time in New York. In addition to a performance at the Knitting Factory, the primary reason for the trip was an invitation from the Düsseldorf photographer Andreas Gursky: he wanted the band to open his retrospective at the Museum of Modern Art with a concert. In November 2001 an EP with Chicks on Speed was released. In addition to three original compositions, they also included a cover of the Nick Cave-Kylie Minogue duet Where The Wild Roses Grow – here, however, with the gender roles reversed. The production garnered positive reviews in The Face, The Wire, NME and was found repeatedly on John Peel's playlists.

=== 2002–2004 ===
In early February 2002, Kreidler gave a preview at the Kunstverein Düsseldorf of the new Kreidler album Eve Future, which varied themes from the band's catalog in a seemingly baroque garb. Detlef Weinrich created six short films to be presented in an installation with live music. In April the video clip for La Casa made the final rounds of the Muvi-Clip Awards at the International Short Film Festival Oberhausen. In the summer of 2003 Kreidler was invited by the Goethe Institute for a series of performances in South East Asia. Eight concerts and a seminar were held in Singapore, Kuala Lumpur, Jakarta, Manila, Hanoi and Bangkok. This is thought to have had an effect on the album that appeared the following year, Eve Future Recall: "With almost mathematical meticulousness, Kreidler have recorded percussive pop gems which are related to Japanese folklore, but also to the metallophone music of Bali. Inso, Kreidler make an extraordinary transfer: they absorb the new music reception of non-European music and transform it into pop" wrote Martin Büsser.

=== 2005-2008 ===
In the following years it was quiet with Kreidler. With the exception of the soundtrack composed by Klein and Reihse for Alexandra Sell's film Durchfahrtsland in 2005 and occasional concerts, the individual members were more involved in their various side projects. In 2008, however, Klein, Reihse and Weinrich reassembled for the production of a new album.

=== 2009–2012 ===
In October 2009, Kreidler released Mosaik 2014, with the single Impressions d'Afrique in spring 2010. The album found positive reviews in the media: 4 stars by Philip Sherburne for Emusic, 4.3/5 by the Milkman. Boomkat stated "An engrossing and entirely out-of-its-time album from an always intriguing fixture of the German leftfield" and Irish Daily Star "The leftfield German outfit compose a soundtrack to a sci-fi movie full of Italo disco and spacey, ambient sequences." While it was highly acclaimed in the German media: Record of the issue in Spex, Groove, or Titel Magazin, record of the year in online magazine Machtdose. The 12 inch single Impressions d'Afrique featured a remix of Ralf Beck. During the following tour Alex Paulick again supported the band and established himself as a full member of Kreidler on the forthcoming albums.

In May 2010, Kreidler were invited by NRW-Forum Düsseldorf to play a concert solely on the iPhone as part of a Night of the Museums. What was claimed as the first iPhone concert ever. The session was released in February 2011 as a limited annual bonus for friends and supporters of the museum.

In spring 2011, Kreidler released Tank on the label Bureau B, up to then mostly famous for its delicate re-issues of classic albums of German electronic and Krautrock artists. According to Alan Holmes "Tank captures Kreidler's live sound more faithfully than ever before, the constant tension between the live rhythm section and sequenced electronics creating a thrilling urgency imbued with the icy precision and nervous energy of a true menschmaschine." Bomkat stated: "Anyone who has been interested in the music scene's move towards shaky, dirty post-punk, disco and early electronic progression recently should check this without delay. Huge recommendation". Jus Forrest wrote in Igloo magazine: 'Its earthy wooded areas are met with shiny melodic twinkle, driving rhythm, and small droplets from the heavens. Simple and direct in structure, Tank shows off a perfect framework on which to add the emotional and expressive., and Mike Schiller: "Tank went from twinkle in Kreidler's eye to fully-realized longplayer in less than two total weeks of work, and nothing about it sounds the least bit raw or unfinished. The cover artwork was provided by Andro Wekua, who continued to collaborate with the band in summer 2011 for a limited edition gatefold set which contained a print of Wekua alongside a vinyl record with new Kreidler song Mars in four different versions (one of each band member). In 2012 the album Den was released, each song accompanied by a video of Heinz Emigholz.

=== 2022–2024 ===
In 2022, Weinrich left the band, and Kreidler continued their work as the trio of Klein, Paulick, Reihse. In January they released Spells and Daubs, co-produced and mixed by Peter Walsh The album gained positive reviews ("Outstanding beatdown slink from Düsseldorf's artful, rhythm-driven minimalists", Boomkat "Kreidler's 12th (or so) studio album is their most concise, focused effort in decades, if not their entire career" Paul Simpson, AllMusic, "a record of meticulous rhythmic precision, lurching, haunting and also deceptively funky in parts with smatterings of ambient dub" Jeremy Allen, Record Collector), and spent a week in the British Official Record Store Chart Top 40.

=== Side projects ===
Thomas Klein works with his partner Petra Bosch as Fauna, solo as Clyne and as Sølyst. Andreas Reihse and Detlef Weinrich produced techno as Binford, as April & Seasons they remixed Kante (Band), and with Alex Paulick and Rob Taylor they called themselves Dark Park. Detlef Weinrich's DJ alias was Sport. As Toulouse Low Track he creates a slow, rhythmic kind of club music that is a relative of old-school Electro. He is also responsible for the artistic/musical program at the Düsseldorf Bar Salon des Amateurs. Andreas Reihse performs and releases as April as well as under his own name, as Herkules Dreigang Duo with Thomas Brinkmann, as BadFrench with Kiki Moorse formerly Chicks on Speed, and together with Thomas Winkler as Periode. Klein and Reihse worked with Klaus Dinger in la!NEU?. Alex Paulick with Rob Taylor as Coloma (formerly Barett Velox, formerly Tonic), and with his partner Caroline Melzig as Narrow Bridges. In 2010 he started 7 Speakers, a series of surround audio installations, e.g. in February 2011 at Transmediale. Paulick is running the digital label Alesque for his projects as well as for friends (e.g. Mildred Hightower, Nolan Churn). Paulick and Reihse cooperate as Lxar focussing on microtonal and surround audio works.

=== Guest musicians ===
Kreidler occasionally work with guest musicians. Florian Dürr, bassist with Kante, played guitar on two tracks on the Weekend album as Flo Metzger; the British singer-songwriter Momus and Argentinean pop star Leo Garcia appear as vocalists on Kreidler, Petra Bosch on Eve Future, and Valerie Sajdik on Eve Future Recall. The album ABC recorded in Tbilisi features a Georgian choir, Flood Nesidano Namises and Ricardo Domeneck on vocal duties, with Eric D. Clark on Spells and Daubs and Khan Of Finland and Natalie Beridze on Twists (a visitor arrives). Kreidler have improvised pieces at concerts together with Tarwater, Momus and Add N to (X). In their first year of existence they regularly accompanied spoken word artists such as Stan Lafleur, Mithu or Zappo.

== Discography ==
=== Studio albums ===
- 1994: Riva
- 1996: Weekend (1999: Mute USA version)
- 1997: Re-Sport (1998: Cpt. Trip, Japan version)
- 1998: Appearance and The Park (1999: Mute USA version)
- 2000: Kreidler (2000: Mute USA version)
- 2002: Eve Future
- 2004: Eve Future Recall
- 2009: Mosaik 2014
- 2011: Tank
- 2011: Mars Chronicles (ltd. edition of 100, signed & numbered)
- 2012: Den
- 2014: ABC
- 2017: European Song
- 2019: Flood
- 2022: Spells and Daubs
- 2024: Twists (a visitor arrives)

=== Live albums ===
- 1999: Mort Aux Vaches (live at VPRO, December 1997)
- 2011: Das iPhone Konzert 2010 (ltd. edition)
- 2014: Alife (also bonus CD for a limited edition of ABC)

=== Singles and EPs ===
- 1995: untitled, 12" mini-album (sometimes credited as Sport)
- 1996: Kookaï, 7"(split-single with Superbilk)
- 1997: Fechterin, 12"
- 1997: untitled, 5-track 12" (white vinyl, ltd., UK only)
- 1998: Au-Pair, 12"/CdS
- 1998: Coldness–Remixed, 12"/CdS
- 2000: Circles, 12"
- 2001: The Chicks on Speed Kreidler Sessions, 12"/CdS (with Chicks on Speed)
- 2010: Impressions d'Afrique, 12"
- 2012: Team, 12" (split-EP with Tarwater)
- 2014: Snowblind / Escaped, 12" (split-EP with Automat)

=== Commissioned works ===
==== Remixes ====
- 1997: Einstürzende Neubauten – Was ist ist
- 1997: Shantel – I'm not afraid
- 1999: A Certain Frank – I'll never leave you
- 1999: Adolf Noise – Heißen Sie?
- 1999: Lundaland – Uh yeh
- 1999: Trance Groove – Trainspotting
- 2000: Appliance – Hot Pursuit
- 2000: Faust – D.I.G.
- 2001: Station 17 – Lied der Doofen
- 2001: Depeche Mode – Born A Lover
- 2001: Phillip Boa & The Voodoo Club – Eugene
- 2002: Metroplex – V2-2
- 2013: Eurythmics – Le Sinistre
- 2017: Edward – Let's Go

==== Cover versions ====
- 1995: Fehlfarben – Angst
- 2000: Franz Treichler's Copier Coller soundbank – Coller und Copier, V/A – Copier-Coller (Subrosa)
- 2000: Joseph Haydn – Deutschland, V/A – Hmn (Sprawl)
- 2004: Hot Butter – Popcorn V/A – Popcorn Reheated (Stereodeluxe)

==== Soundtracks ====
- 2005: Alexandra Sell – Durchfahrtsland
- 2014: Heinz Emigholz – The Airstrip – Decampment of Modernism
- 2014: Tommy Pallotta & Femke Wolting – The Last Hijack
- 2017: Heinz Emigholz – 2+2=22 [The Alphabet]
- 2020: Heinz Emigholz – The Last City

== Videos ==
- 1996: Reflections, directed by Michael Laakmann
- 1998: Au-Pair, written by Detlef Weinrich, directed by Sebastian Kutscher
- 1998: Coldness (Sunroof Mix), directed by Sebastian Kutscher
- 1999: Reflections, directed by Markus Vater
- 2000: Sans Soleil, directed by Giorgi Sumbadze
- 2000: Mnemorex, directed by Markus Vater
- 2001: Mnemorex, directed by André Niebur
- 2001: Circles, directed by André Niebur
- 2002: The Chicks on Speed Kreidler Sessions (3 videos), directed by Detlef Weinrich
- 2002: Eve Future (6 videos), directed by Detlef Weinrich
- 2009: Mosaik 2014 (trailer), directed by Detlef Weinrich
- 2010: Impressions d'Afrique, directed by Jörg Langkau
- 2011: Kremlin rules, directed by Jörg Langkau
- 2011: Saal, directed by Jörg Langkau
- 2012: Jaguar, directed by Jörg Langkau
- 2012: New Earth, directed by Jörg Langkau
- 2012: Rote Wüste, directed by Heinz Emigholz
- 2012: Cascade, directed by Heinz Emigholz
- 2012: Sun, directed by Heinz Emigholz
- 2012: Deadwringer, directed by Heinz Emigholz
- 2013: Moth Race, directed by Heinz Emigholz
- 2013: Celtic Ghosts, directed by Heinz Emigholz
- 2013: Winter, directed by Heinz Emigholz
- 2014: Modul, directed by Heinz Emigholz – as trailer for 2+2=22 (The Alphabet)
- 2014: Alphabet, directed by Lior Shamriz
- 2014: Destino, directed by Lior Shamriz
- 2014: The Cultural Attaché / Tornado, directed by Lior Shamriz
- 2015: Ceramic, directed by Lior Shamriz
- 2017: Kannibal, directed by Jörg Langkau
- 2017: Radio Island, directed by Guthrie McDonald
- 2019: Nesindano, directed by Andreas Reihse
- 2020: Eurydike, directed by Andreas Reihse and Zaza Rusadze
- 2023: Loisaida Sisters, directed by Andreas Reihse
- 2023: Hopscotch, directed by Andreas Reihse
