= ABC (Kreidler album) =

Studio album by Kreidler
- Released: 2014
- Recorded: Pre-production: September 2013, Berghain-Kantine Berlin with Sebastian Jechorek, Recording: October 2013, Kartuli Pilmi Tbilisi with GVAJI, Mixing: November 2013, LowSwing Studios Berlin with Guy Sternberg
- Genre: Electronic
- Length: 35:44
- Label: Bureau-B
- Producer: Kreidler

Kreidler chronology
Den (2012)	ABC (2014)	European Song (2017)

Professional ratings
Review scores
Source	Rating
Allmusic	3.5/5 stars

ABC is an album by electronica group Kreidler, released in 2014. It marks the 20th anniversary of the band.

== Artwork ==
The front-cover depicts an (untitled) artwork by Georgian artist Thea Djordjadze. The back-cover shows stills of the group's recording session in Tbilisi shot by Heinz Emigholz. The inner sleeve (vinyl version) depicts another (untitled) artwork by Djordjadze; the CD is packed in a jewel case with the artworks on two changeable cardboards.

== Track listing ==
Side one
No.	Title	Length
1.	"Nino"	6:56
2.	"Alphabet"	6:41
3.	"Destino"	4:27

Side two
No.	Title	Length
4.	"Modul"	6:40
5.	"Ceramic"	7:22
6.	"Tornado"	3:38

== Music videos ==
Similar to the previous two albums of Kreidler ABC is accompanied by a collaboration with a film director. Lior Shamriz contributed clips to four of the songs of ABC.

The videos for "Alphabet", "Destino" and "Ceramic" conjoin to a love story between three boys on a beach. In Tornado an off-voice speaks about the strange encounter of an architect with a billionaire to a black screen, when the music sets in the picture stars flickering (the spoken word section The Cultural Attaché isn't part of the original song).

"The Cultural Attaché /Tornado" was awarded with 2nd prize in the MuVi competition of 62. International Short Film Festival Oberhausen. According to the jury, "... we thought this video presented an interesting start to negating some of the more conventional music video tropes".

=== Film: 2+2=22 (THE ALPHABET) ===
Additionally there is a video for "Modul" by Heinz Emigholz. He accompanied the band during their recordings in Tbilisi, Georgia, shooting footage for 2+2=22 (THE ALPHABET) a film scheduled for release in 2017. With "Modul" as the trailer for the film.

== Bonus CD ==
A limited edition of "ABC" (vinyl and CD) comes with a bonus live album on CD:

=== Track listing ===
1. "Good Morning City" (Garage London 1999)
2. "Zoom" (Battery Park Cologne 1999)
3. "110" (Archa Theatre Praha 2007)
4. "Boccia" (Kaserne Basel 1996)
5. "Plus" (MoMA-The Museum Of Modern Art New York City 2001)
6. "European Grey" (Übel & Gefährlich Hamburg 2009)
7. "Unreleased" (Club Vega Copenhagen 1998)
8. "Evil Love" (Stadtgarten Cologne 2011)
9. "Jaguar" (Stadtgarten Cologne 2011)
10. "New Earth" (Stadtgarten Cologne 2011)
11. "Estatico" (Muziekodrom Hasselt 2001)
12. "D.F." (Palacio de Bellas Artes Mexico City 2010)
13. "Impressions d'Afrique" (Exit 07 Letzebuerg 2011)

(Track durations are not mentioned.)

== Personnel ==
Kreidler

- Thomas Klein
- Alexander Paulick
- Andreas Reihse
- Detlef Weinrich

Choir

- Nino Gulbatashvili
- Salome Makaridze
- Beka Sebiskveradze
- Ucha Pataridze

Technical personnel

- Sebastian Jechorek – assistant pre-production, Kantine Berghain Berlin, September 2013
- GVAJI – recording, Kartuli Pilmis Studia Tbilisi, October 2013
- Guy Sternberg – mixing, LowSwing Studios Berlin, November 2013
- Florian von Keyserlingk – mixing assistant
- Rashad Becker – mastering, Dubplates & Mastering Berlin, December 2013
