= Den (album) =

Studio album by Kreidler
- Released: 2012
- Recorded: February–March 2012 (at LowSwing Studios Berlin); Additional recordings: June 2010 (Festsaal Kreuzberg Berlin), December 2011–March 2012 (Paulick-Saal Berlin, Spreepark Studios Berlin, and Klyne Düsseldorf)
- Genre: Electronic
- Length: 39:21
- Label: Bureau-B
- Producer: Kreidler

Kreidler chronology
Mars Chronicles (2011)	Den (2012)	ABC (2014)

Professional ratings
Review scores
Source	Rating
Allmusic	3.5/5 stars

Den is an album by electronica group Kreidler, released in 2012.

== Cover artwork ==
The cover artwork is by Italian artist Enrico David. Analogously to the preceding Kreidler album Tank, there is an art piece on the front cover, and another one on the inner sleeve (vinyl version); the CD is packed in a jewel case with the artwork on two changeable cardboards.

== Track listing ==
No.	Title	Length
1.	"Sun"	5:32
2.	"Deadwringer"	6:17
3.	"Rote Wüste"	8:06
4.	"Cascade"	5:32
5.	"Moth Race"	3:54
6.	"Celtic Ghosts"	1:32
7.	"Winter"	8:02

== Music videos ==
The album is accompanied by a collaboration between film director Heinz Emigholz and Kreidler, with Emigholz contributing clips to all the songs on Den. The videos contain alternate song versions, most remarkable "Rote Wüste", where the video, at 21:12, runs nearly three times longer than the album version.

The readers of German magazine Spex voted "Rote Wüste" as favorite video No. 7 in the top ten for 2012. "Moth Race" won the 15th MuVi Award for "Best German Music Video" at the 59th International Short Film Festival Oberhausen in May 2013. The production company Filmgalerie 451 lists "Sun", "Rote Wüste" and "Moth Race" as trailers for Heinz Emigholz' film The Airstrip - Decampment of Modernism.

Released videos

1. "Rote Wüste" – 21:12 (September 2012).
2. "Cascade" – 5:52 (October 2012).
3. "Sun" – 5:54 (November 2012).
4. "Deadwringer" – 6:37 (December 2012).
5. "Moth Race" – 3:55 (February 2013).
6. "Celtic Ghosts" – 3:31 (May 2013).
7. "Winter" – 8:02 (June 2013).

== Personnel ==
Kreidler

- Thomas Klein – drums, and electronic musical instruments
- Alexander Paulick – guitar, and electronic musical instruments
- Andreas Reihse – synthesizers, and electronic musical instruments
- Detlef Weinrich – electronic musical instruments

Technical personnel

- Guy Sternberg – recording, mixing
- Florian von Keyserlingk – assistant
- Stefan Betke – mastering (at Scape-Mastering Berlin, April 2012)

== Reception ==
Den holds a score of 61 out of 100 ("generally favorable") based on 7 reviews on review-aggregating website Metacritic.
