= Flood (Kreidler album) =

Studio album by Kreidler
- Released: October 25, 2019
- Recorded: 2018–19
- Studio: Kabawil Düsseldorf, Paulick Saal Berlin, 13 Floor Elevator Berlin, LowSwing Tonstudio
- Genre: Electronic music; electronic dance music
- Length: 35:18
- Label: Bureau B

Kreidler chronology
| European Song (2017) | Flood (2019) | Spells and Daubs (2022) |

Flood is a studio album by electronic music group Kreidler. It was released by German record label Bureau B on October 25, 2019. The album consists of 5 songs, which include collaborations with poets/vocalists Nesindano Namises, and Ricardo Domeneck. The album was released on cd, vinyl, limited red vinyl, and digitally. Edited versions of Flood IV and Celeration were separately released as digital singles on Spotify as well as videos for Nesindano and Eurydike on Youtube.

== Background and release ==
The album was recorded and produced in four different locations: in Düsseldorf at Kabawil, and in Berlin at Paulick Saal, 13 Floor Elevator, and LowSwing Tonstudio. Mastering took place at Man Made Mastering by Mike Grinser. Recording sessions started in Winter 2018 in Düsseldorf.

Side one of the vinyl (respectively the first part of the cd) consists of three single songs, while side two of the vinyl (and accordingly the second part of the cd) is allocated to Flood I - IV which seamless transition into each other, and Flood V.

The song Nesindano features Namibian artist/activist Nesindano Namises a.k.a. Khoes performing her poem Sida Hoada in Khoekhoe. Flood II features Brazilian poet Ricardo Domeneck reciting his poem Os Calendários e os Ciclos in Portuguese.

== Artwork ==
The album artwork is by artists Anders Clausen and Henrik Olesen. The cover depicts a manipulated bespoken feather mounted on a bright yellow backdrop, next to album/song titles and credits in red letters. The inner sleeve depicts an augmented monochrome photography of an harbour scene, in a greyish green colour and the letters A ship of no port. The labels depict illustrations of windscreen wipers alongside further credits.

A limited edition of 200 copies of the vinyl version came in red vinyl pressing.

== Videos ==
The video for Nesindano directed by Andreas Reihse with postproduction by Zaza Rusadze was published on 24 October 2019. It follows the color theme and aesthetics of the album cover, and depicts the song lyrics in a moving karaoke-like style alongside dancing boots and running tubes.

A second video Eurydike also by Reihse/Rusadze premiered in April 2020 at Internationale Kurzfilmtage Oberhausen where it was awarded the first prize of 22nd MuVi Award for the Best German Music Video: "Eurydike abstractly addresses the ancient topic by rhythmically editing associative images to Kreidler’s music. To appreciate the effort of transferring a very complex topic into the aesthetics of a 4-minute music video, the MuVi jury decided to award this year’s first prize to Eurydike"

== Critical reception ==
Professional ratings
Review scores
| Source | Rating |
|---|---|
| AllMusic | 3.5/5 stars |

Flood was generally met with positive reviews from critics.

Matt Mead wrote on Gigslutz: "With similarities to Kraftwerk and Air, the album exhibits swathes of atmosphere music pieces which evoke days of traveling at night on a cool summers evening or lazy days whilst the sun goes down." While Mr Olivetti concluded his review on Freq with: "There is mystery and intrigue here, as well as sparse beauty and joyous movement that definitely bears repeated listening." And Paul Simpson of Allmusic stated: "The overall effect of the album is tense but escapist, like taking a pleasant vacation but still not quite approaching complete relaxation." In Germany the album was record of the week in Spex magazine, and on the Elektro Beats radio program of RBB. Prog/Krautrock site Babyblaue Seiten rated Flood with 12/15, the album marks an impressive return to old form for the band while Frank Sawatzki awarded 4 1/2 of 6 stars in his review for Musikexpress: "Nachdenkliche Elektronik at its best".

== Track listing ==
Credits adapted from Discogs.

Kreidler
| No. | Title | Writer(s) | Length |
|---|---|---|---|
| 1. | "Eurydike" | Kreidler | 5:06 |
| 2. | "Celeration" | Kreidler | 5:41 |
| 3. | "Nesindano" (featuring Khoes) | Kreidler; Nesindano Namises | 5:49 |

Flood
| No. | Title | Writer(s) | Length |
|---|---|---|---|
| 4. | "Flood I–IV" (Flood II featuring Ricardo Domeneck) | Flood I, III & IV Kreidler, Flood II Kreidler & Ricardo Domeneck | 12:44 |
| 5. | "Flood V" | Kreidler | 5:47 |

== Personnel ==
Credits adapted from Discogs and official album page

Kreidler

- Thomas Klein
- Alexander Paulick
- Andreas Reihse
- Detlef Weinrich

Poems and Voices

- Nesindano Namises as Khoes, Sida Hoada on Nesindano
- Ricardo Domeneck, Os Calendários e os Ciclos on Flood II

Technical

- Guy Sternberg, Recording engineer, Lowswing Studio
- Benedikt Vogt, Assisting engineer, Lowswing Studio
- Mike Grinser, Mastering and vinyl cut, Manmade Mastering

Artwork

- Anders Clausen
- Henrik Olesen
- Retouching by Ilja Niederkirchner
