= Pablo Jofré =

Chilean poet (born 1974)

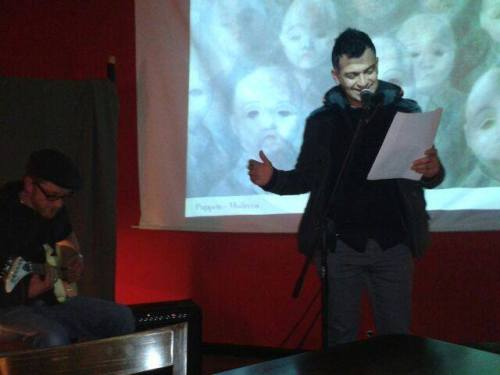
Pablo Jofré (2017).

Pablo Jofré (born 1974) is a Chilean poet currently living and working in Berlin, Germany. Jofré was awarded the Lagar Prize by the Chilean National Contest of Literature Gabriela Mistral (La Serena) for the poetry collection Abecedario in 2009. He also won first prize at the Sant Andreu de la Barca Competition (in Spain) for his poem "La Danza de la Existencia (Extranjería)" in 2010.

== Biography ==
After the school in Santiago de Chile in 1992, Jofré travelled to Europe for the first time. He spent a year visiting Germany, France, Spain, and Portugal and studied German and English. Back in Chile, he studied journalism at the Diego Portales University and cultural anthropology at the University of Chile. Before obtaining his degree, he went to Barcelona in 2002 to study literary theory and comparative literature at the University of Barcelona. He also studied Catalan and French and attended literary workshops led by Leonardo Valencia and Joan-Ignasi Elias. In 2011, he was awarded Spanish nationality and emigrated to Berlin.

== Poetry ==
Jofré published his first poem as a teenager. This was followed by Abecedario (2009, 2012, 2017) available in English as Abecedary, translated by David Shook with a prologue by Will Alexander. It includes the audioleporello (audiobook) Usted with works of electroacoustic music by composer Mario Peña y Lillo. This was launched in 2013 in Barcelona's Balaguer Gallery as part of the collective exhibition I don't believe in You but I believe in Love curated by Paola Marugán. His poem "La Edad Ligera" (in Extranjería) was included in the public performance Bombing of Poems (Casagrande-Southbank Center) above the Jubilee Gardens in London in 2012. His work appears in the anthology El tejedor en… Berlin (Sestao 2015) published by Ernesto Estrella and Jorge Locane, and Extranjería (Santiago de Chile 2017) with a prologue by Diego Ramírez Gajardo (Carnicería Punk)) and a cover by Carola del Río This was launched in Chile with a reading tour in public libraries in Arica, Santiago, Valparaíso, Concepción, Temuco, Puerto Montt and Punta Arenas. In December 2019 he published Berlin Manila (L.U.P.I/Zoográfico), a collection of poems that replicates a trip from Berlin to Manila, and in 2020, Luis Luna published in Amargord (Madrid) the collected poetry Entre tanta calle with prologue by Julio Espinoza Guerra. Entre tanta calle was also published by Marisol Vera in Cuarto Propio (Santiago, Chile 2024) with prologue by Gian Pierre Codarlupo.

Abecedario was translated into German by Barbara Buxbaum and Johanna Menzinger with an epilogue written by José F.A. Oliver and a cover by Ginés Olivares (Cologne 2017). It was translated into Italian by Maurizio Fantoni Minnella in 2017, into English by David Shook with an prologue written by Will Alexander and into French by Pierre Fankhauser (BSN Press 2019).

Berlín Manila was published in German by Adrian Kasnitz in Parasitenpresse (Cologne) as Berlin – Manila, translated by Odile Kennel.

In 2023 – Maria Alzira Brum Lemos' translation of Entre tanta calle into Portuguese (Entre tanta rua) is published by Ricardo Corona in Medusa (Curitiba, Brazil) with a foreword by Renato Negrão, Shooks' translation of Entre tanta calle into English (Street by Street) is published by Mathew Timmons in Insert Press (Los Angeles, California), the translation of Entre tanta calle into German (Straße um Straße) is published by Adrian Kasnitz in parasitenpresse (Cologne, Germany) and Fankhausers' translation of Entre tanta calle into French (De rue en rue) is published by Marcel Burger in À côté de cela (Geneva, Switzerland).

Jofré participated in the literature Festival LEA in Athens in 2015, the George Town Literary Festival in Malaysia directed by Bernice Chauly (2015 and 2016), in the Festival internazionale di poesia di Genova 2017 directed by Claudio Pozzani. He also appeared at the 2017 Literature biennale Lifes in Jakarta, directed by Ayu Utami. In 2020 he has participated in Festival Enclave in Mexico City, directed by Rocío Cerón, in the 21. Poesiefestival Berlin and in the Europäisches Literaturfestival Köln-Kalk. In 2022, Jofré takes part in the Festival Kerouac in Mexico City.

In collaboration with Berlin musician Andi Meissner (e-guitar) he has created the duo Jofre Meissner Project whose repertoire includes poems from Extranjería and Abecedario. The duo premiered with a performance of "La edad ligera" (The Light Age) at the New York Crossroads festival in 2014.

Jofré has also translated the poetry of Nora Gomringer, Adrian Kasnitz, Odile Kennel, Karla Reimert, David Shook and Elfriede Jelinek; and has collaborated in the Madrid section of El País, in the Cultura/s supplement of La Vanguardia and in the newspaper Abc.

== Awards ==
- 2009 Lagar Prize by the Chilean National Contest of Literature Gabriela Mistral (La Serena) for the poetry collection Abecedario.
- 2010 first prize at the Sant Andreu de la Barca Competition (in Spain) for his poem La Danza de la Existencia (Extranjería).
- 2016 Scholarship of literary creation by the Chilean Ministry of Culture.
- 2017, 2021 Stipendiate Resident at the Translation House Looren.
- 2018-23 Stipendiate Resident at the Europäisches Übersetzer-Kollegium in Straelen.
