= Kreidler Tank =

Tank

Studio album by Kreidler
- Released: 2011
- Recorded: 2010
- Genres: Electronic, krautrock
- Length: 43:42
- Label: Bureau-B
- Producer: Kreidler

Kreidler chronology
Das iPhone Konzert 2010 (2011)	Tank (2011)	Mars Chronicles (2011)

Professional ratings
Review scores
Source	Rating
Allmusic	4/5 stars
PopMatters	7/10 Damn Good

Tank is an album by electronica group Kreidler, released in 2011.

== Track listing ==
1. "New Earth" – 6:41
2. "Evil Love" – 7:22
3. "Jaguar" – 7:31
4. "Gas Giants" – 6:44
5. "Saal" – 7:50
6. "Kremlin rules" – 7:34

== Credits ==
Recording, Cask, Hall of Distant Fragrance: Tobias Levin, Electric Avenue Hamburg, 13–17 September 2010. Additional recordings by Kreidler, Festsaal Kreuzberg Berlin, June 2010, Spreepark Studios Berlin, October 2010, and Klyne Düsseldorf, October 2010. Additional editing: Alex Rojas, October 2010. Mixing: Hannes Bieger, Berlin, October 2010. Mastering: Bo Kondren at Calyx-Mastering Berlin, 9 November 2010. Published by Edition Tapete/ Bureau-B.

== Production ==
The record was prepared during a three-day session at Festsaal Kreuzberg in Berlin, in five days recorded in Hamburg with Tobias Levin, then again in Berlin in eight days mixed analog on tape with Hannes Bieger, and mastered by Bo Kondren.

== Cover artwork ==
The cover artwork is by Georgian artist Andro Wekua: for the vinyl version "Workshop Report" is printed glossy on the matt finished cover, with "Double Reality" on the inner sleeve. The cd is packed in a jewel case with the art works on two changeable cardboards.

== Videos ==
Four official videos were directed by Jörg Langkau, student of Heinz Emigholz:

1. "Kremlin Rules" – 4:14 (February 2011),
2. "Saal" – 5:00 (September 2011),
3. "New Earth" – 7:30 (March 2012),
4. "Jaguar" – 7:25 (August 2012).
