= Odile Kennel =

German writer of French origin (born 1967)

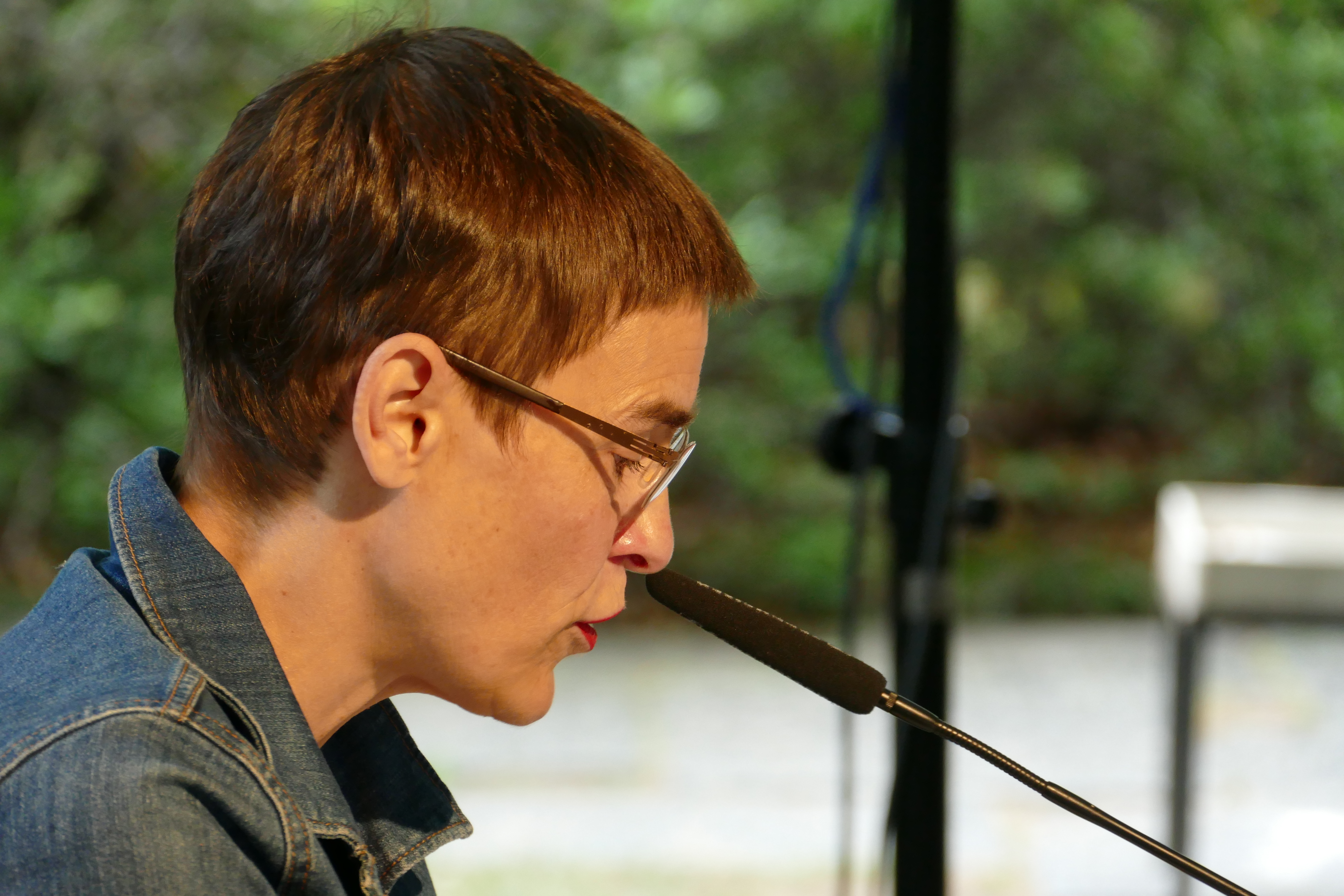
- Odile Kennel at a poetry festival in Berlin 2018
- Born: 1967 (age 58–59); Bühl (Baden), West Germany
- Writing career
- Notable awards: Würth-Literaturpreis; 1996; Alfred-Döblin-Stipendium; 2011

Odile Kennel (born 1967) is a German writer of French origin known for her poetry and prose, as well as her translations.

== Life and work ==
Odile Kennel majored in cultural studies and studied political sciences in Tübingen, Berlin and Lisbon. She studied cultural management in Bucharest and Dijon. She grew up bilingual. Besides her own writing, which was represented often in the German media, Odile Kennel translates poetry from the French, Portuguese and Spanish language into German. She also worked for many years as a cultural mediator. Odile Kennel does public readings of her own works on a regular basis. Odile Kennel works and lives in Berlin.

== Publications ==
=== Prose ===
- Wimpernflug – eine atemlose Erzählung, Edition Ebersbach, Dortmund 2000
- Was Ida sagt. Novel, dtv, Munich 2011, ISBN 978-3-423-24896-9
- Mit Blick auf See. Novel, dtv, Munich 2017, ISBN 978-3-423-28113-3

=== Poetry ===
- oder wie heißt diese interplanetare Luft, dtv, Munich 2013

=== Translations (selected works) ===
- Jacques Darras: Endlich raus aus dem Wald. 1914 noch einmal von vorne. Ein rasendes Thesengedicht. Translated from French. KLAK-Verlag 2017
- Érica Zíngano: Ich weiß nicht, warum. Zeichnungen und Texte für Unica Zürn. Translated from Portuguese, Hochroth Verlag, Berlin 2013
- Ricardo Domeneck: Körper: ein Handbuch. Translated from Portuguese, Verlagshaus J. Frank, Berlin 2013
- Damaris Calderón: Sprache und Scharfrichter. Translated from Spanish, Parasitenpresse, Cologne 2011
- Angélica Freitas: Rilke Shake. Poems, bilingual, translated from Portuguese. Luxbooks, Wiesbaden 2011
- Jean Portante: Die Arbeit des Schattens Translated from French. Editions PHI, Esch/Alzette 2005

== Awards and stipends ==
- 1996: Würth-Literaturpreis
- 2000: Stipend of the Senate of Berlin
- 2001: Stipend to stay at Künstlerhaus Lukas by the Kulturfonds foundation
- 2004: Award of the Rheinsberger Autorinnenforums
- 2009: Stipend of the German Translators Fund DÜF for the translation of the poetrybook "Rilke Shake" by Angélica Freitas
- 2011: Stipend of the Foundation Künstlerdorf Schöppingen
- 2011: Alfred-Döblin-Stipendium
- 2012: Stipend of the German Translators Fund DÜF for the translation of a poetrybook by Ricardo Domeneck
- 2013: Gisela-Scherer-Stipendium
- 2014: Stipend of the Stuttgarter Schriftstellerhaus
- 2014: 2. winner of Lyrikpreis München
- 2016: Stipend of the Senate of Berlin
- 2016: Author of the year, elected by the Autorinnenvereinigung
