= European Song =

European Song may refer to:

- "European Song" (song), a 1983 football song performed by the Aberdeen FC squad
- European Song (album), a 2017 album by Kreidler
