= Mars Chronicles =

Studio album by Kreidler
- Released: 2011
- Genre: Electronic
- Length: 31:33
- Label: en/of
- Producer: Kreidler

Kreidler chronology
| Tank (2011) | Mars Chronicles (2011) | Den (2012) |

Mars Chronicles is a limited vinyl album by electronica group Kreidler, released in 2011.

== Track listing ==
Mars Chronicles I–IV

I "LX" – 8:14

II "Sølyst" – 7:37

III "April Moon" – 9:33

IV "Lo Firer Esplendor" – 6:02

== Credits ==
Recorded in Hamburg, Electric Avenue, by Tobias Levin.

Mixed in Berlin (I & III) and Düsseldorf (II & IV).

Mastered & Cut in Berlin, Dubplates & Mastering, by Rashad Becker.

== Production ==
The record contains 4 different remixes of a song called Mars, with each member of the band contributing a version. "LX" can be attributed to Alex Paulick, "Sølyst" is Thomas Klein's moniker for his solo-albums, Andreas Reihse has released as "April", which leaves "Lo Firer Esplendor" to Detlef Weinrich.

Mars Chronicles seems to be a verbicide on Ray Bradbury's book The Martian Chronicles (in German: "Die Mars Chroniken").

== Release ==
The album is the second collaboration between Georgian artist Andro Wekua and the band – after the album "Tank" earlier in 2011.

It was released August 2011 in a hand-numbered edition of 100 (plus 30 Artist's proofs) on Dutch/German label en/of (EN/OF 043).

The first flapper of the gatefold sleeve holds Sunset a photo print signed by Andro Wekua, the second flapper the vinyl.
