= George Town Literary Festival =

Malaysian book event

- Genre: Literary festival
- Locations: George Town, Malaysia
- Years active: 2011 – present
- Website: georgetownlitfest.com

The George Town Literary Festival (GTLF) is an annual literary festival which takes place in the city of George Town, Penang, Malaysia. Since its establishment in 2011, it has grown to become the largest world literature festival organised in Malaysia.

== History ==
The George Town Literary Festival (GTLF) was initiated in 2011 by former Chief Minister of Penang, Lim Guan Eng, debuting with a line-up of five writers. Penang Global Tourism led production from 2011-2014, while Penang Institute took charge in 2015. Penang Institute organised the festival in 2024.

The festival's first eight editions (with the exception of 2014) were curated by Bernice Chauly under the direction of the State Government of Penang. She was appointed festival director in 2015 and continued leading the curatorial team until 2018.

Festival founder Lim Guan Eng and national laureate A. Samad Said exchange mementos in 2012.

=== 2011: History & Heritage: Where are our Stories? ===
GTLF's inaugural edition was themed “History & Heritage: Where are our Stories?” and comprised 7 events held across 26 & 27 November 2011. Taking place in the then-newly established China House and the Eastern & Oriental Hotel, the festival's five headliners were Malaysian authors Muhammed Haji Salleh, Farish A. Noor, Iskandar Al-Bakri, Shih-Li Kow and Tan Twan Eng.

=== 2012: Voyages. Hopes. Dreams. ===
Themed "Voyages. Hopes. Dreams." the second edition of the festival was the first to feature an international lineup comprising writers from India, Indonesia, Malaysia, the Netherlands, Singapore and the United Kingdom. Held at Sekeping Victoria, China House and Studio @ Straits, the festival spanned 20 events while its duration was extended to 3 days. Its line-up of 26 writers and moderators included A. Samad Said, Alfian Sa'at, David van Reybrouck, Linda Christanty and Nii Ayikwei Parkes.

=== 2013: The Ties That Bind ===
Due to increased support from foreign embassies and government agencies, the 2013 festival programme grew to feature 37 events in Sekeping Victoria, China House and 179 Victoria Street. Themed "The Ties That Bind", 20 speakers headlined the festival including Ali Cobby Eckermann, Eric Hansen, Tash Aw, Christine Otten and Lat.

=== 2014: Capital ===
The 2014 edition was notable for being curated by the Cooler Lumpur Festival. It took place in Whiteaways Arcade and was themed "Capital". The festival shifted its focus to writers, with programmes aimed at developing local writing and the publishing industry. There was also a fringe programme comprising a stand-up comedy performance and a pub quiz. It spanned 38 events and featured 27 speakers including Eddin Khoo, Miguel Syjuco, John Krich, Sudhir Thomas Vadaketh and Susan Barker.

=== 2015: We Are Who We Are/Are We Who We Are? ===
In 2015, the festival was themed "We Are Who We Are/Are We Who We Are?" in conjunction with its focus on dissecting the human and Malaysian identity. and featured 36 speakers including Wajahat Ali, Evan Fallenberg, Robin Hemley, Pablo Jofré and Hanne Ørstavik. The keynote was delivered by Marina Mahathir.

=== 2016: Hiraeth ===
In recognition of the displacement of communities across the globe, the 2016 festival was themed "Hiraeth". The festival, which took place in Wisma Yeap Choy Ee, Black Kettle and China House, brought 40 writers together across 44 sessions. The festival keynote was delivered by Zainah Anwar, preceding a lecture on the theme by A. C. Grayling. Other headliners included Adriaan van Dis, Nathalie Handal, Mahesh Dattani, Olga Martynova and Stephen James Smith.

The festival's growing presence and increasing public attention led to pro-government supporters defacing an exhibition by Zunar, whose works commented politically on former Prime Minister Najib Razak's corruption allegations. Zunar's eventual arrest drew international attention from human rights watchdogs as well as support for the festival's position as a platform for free speech. The launch of his book, Wasabi, was cancelled as a result. The 2016 edition of the festival is also notable for scoring a nomination in the Literary Festival Award category at the LBF International Excellence Awards.

Anwar Ibrahim addresses questions in 2018.

=== 2017: Monsters & (Im)Mortals ===
In 2017, the festival featured a theme of "Monsters & (Im)Mortals". Featuring a larger curatorial team due to the addition of Gareth Richards and Pauline Fan as co-curators, the festival line-up comprised 46 writers and 55 activities. Among the year's headliners were Gerður Kristný, Mei Fong, Latiff Mohidin, Laksmi Pamuntjak and Gündüz Vassaf. The 2017 edition became the first literary festival in Southeast Asia to receive the Literary Festival Award at the LBF International Excellence Awards in the following year.

=== 2018: The State of Freedom ===
The 2018 edition was themed "The State of Freedom" to commemorate the anniversaries of human rights milestones around the globe, the state of Penang's commitment to freedom of expression, and Malaysia's first change in government since achieving independence 59 years prior.

Extended to run across 4 days, the 2018 edition featured the largest line-up of writers and number of events in the festival's history. 82 writers were present at the festival's 65 events, including Sjón, Lemn Sissay, Ivan Coyote, Arshia Sattar and Jean-Christophe Rufin. Notable events at the 2018 edition included a conversation with Anwar Ibrahim, a section on LGBTQIA+ discourses, as well as the inaugural Malaysia National Poetry Slam.

=== 2019: forewords/afterwords ===
The 2019 edition is themed "forewords/afterwords" in reference to W. H. Auden's final collection of essays. Taking place from 21–24 November 2019, the festival will be directed by Pauline Fan and Sharaad Kuttan, marking the first time two co-directors will helm the festival in its 9-year history. The line-up of the festival will include 2019 Man Booker International Prize winner Jokha al-Harthi, as well as 2019 EBRD Literature Prize winner Hamid Ismailov.

=== 2020: Through The Looking Glass ===
The tenth edition was themed Through The Looking Glass, which looks at the role of literature and art in a time of crisis. Due to the pandemic, this is the first edition of the festival to have been shifted entirely online. The festival programme presented mostly online, with a series of podcasts and videos both in English and Bahasa Malaysia; featuring conversations, discussions, readings and radio drama. All conversations were available on Spotify. The online edition also featured young Malaysians who have had their works recognised internationally. They include Joshua Kam (winner Epigram Books Fiction Prize 2020), graphic novelist Erica Eng (Eisner Award for Best Webcomic), and Kulleh Grasi (shortlisted for the National Translation Award in Poetry 2020 in the US).

=== 2021: Mikro-cosmos ===
GTLF's theme for 2021, Mikro-cosmos, explored the spirit of cosmopolitanism and interconnectedness that endures through literature, language and ideas, even as the troubles of today atomize our existence and deepen social fragmentation. This was the second edition to be held digitally with a small amount events taking place physically during the weekend of the festival. Regional and international headliners include Indonesian novelist Eka Kurniawan, Japanese writer Minae Mizumura, German poet Jan Wagner, Canadian writer Souvankham Thammavongsa, New Zealand novelist Tina Makereti, and Kenyan-US writer Mukoma Wa Ngugi. The festival was directed by Pauline Fan.

=== 2024: Word on the Street ===
In 2024, the festival was organised by the Penang Institute, and directed by its executive director, Datuk Dr Ooi Kee Beng. Novelist Tan Twan Eng gave the keynote address, with other speakers including writer and sociolinguist Dipika Mukherjee, fiction writer and poet Shivani Sivagurunathan, Irish-Australian author Tracey Morton, and French-Vietnamese cartoonist Clement Baloup.

== Description ==
George Town Literary Festival (GTLF) is Malaysia's largest international literary festival, and as of 2024 is held in the UAB Building in George Town. The festival celebrates world literature, translations, and the literary arts, with various writers, artists and thinkers from diverse locations and disciplines coming together annually to engage in intellectual discourse. It is the only literary festival funded by the state government in Malaysia.

The festival generally takes place on last weekend of November. As of 2014 admission to the festival is free to all members of the public.

As of 2025 festival is organised by the Penang Institute.

== Recognition ==
GTLF was the first literary event in Southeast Asia to receive the Literary Festival Award at the London Book Fair International Excellence Awards.

== Publications ==
=== Muara ===
To celebrate the decade of GTLF that has passed, GTLF collaborated with Svara journal to produce a special publication called Muara. Taking its name from the Malay word for estuary, Muara is a passage of fluidity and connection, where the river meets the open sea. Featuring essays, lectures, short stories, poetry, book reviews, and translations, the book was launched in conjunction with GTLF2021. It is subtitled Confluence: Pertemuan.

Muara is now an annual GTLF publication featuring essays, short stories, poetry, book reviews, and translations.
