= Starhill Forest Arboretum =

Private arboretum in Petersburg, Illinois

Coordinates: 39°56.1′N 89°48.1′W

- Interactive map of Starhill Forest Arboretum
- Type: Private arboretum
- Location: 12000 Boy Scout Trail, Petersburg, Illinois
- Area: 50 acres (20 ha)
- Created: 1976
- Operator: Guy Sternberg, Edie Sternberg
- Open: By appointment only
- Website: https://starhillforest.com/wp1/

Starhill Forest Arboretum (50 acres (20 ha)) is a private arboretum located at 12000 Boy Scout Trail, Petersburg, Illinois.

== History ==
The arboretum has been owned and operated by the Sternberg family (Edie Sternberg and Guy Sternberg) since 1976. Old trees in the forested areas date to about 1850, and the oldest planted trees were started from seed in 1964 and transplanted from another location.

The Sternbergs named it Starhill Forest, derived from their last name which means "star mountain" in German.

In 1989, five additional acres were added to the south and was completed in 2002. In 2015, the Catalpa House was acquired.

The present-day arboretum has 50 acres (20 ha) and seven buildings, three ponds, numerous trails, and thousands of trees.

== Collection ==
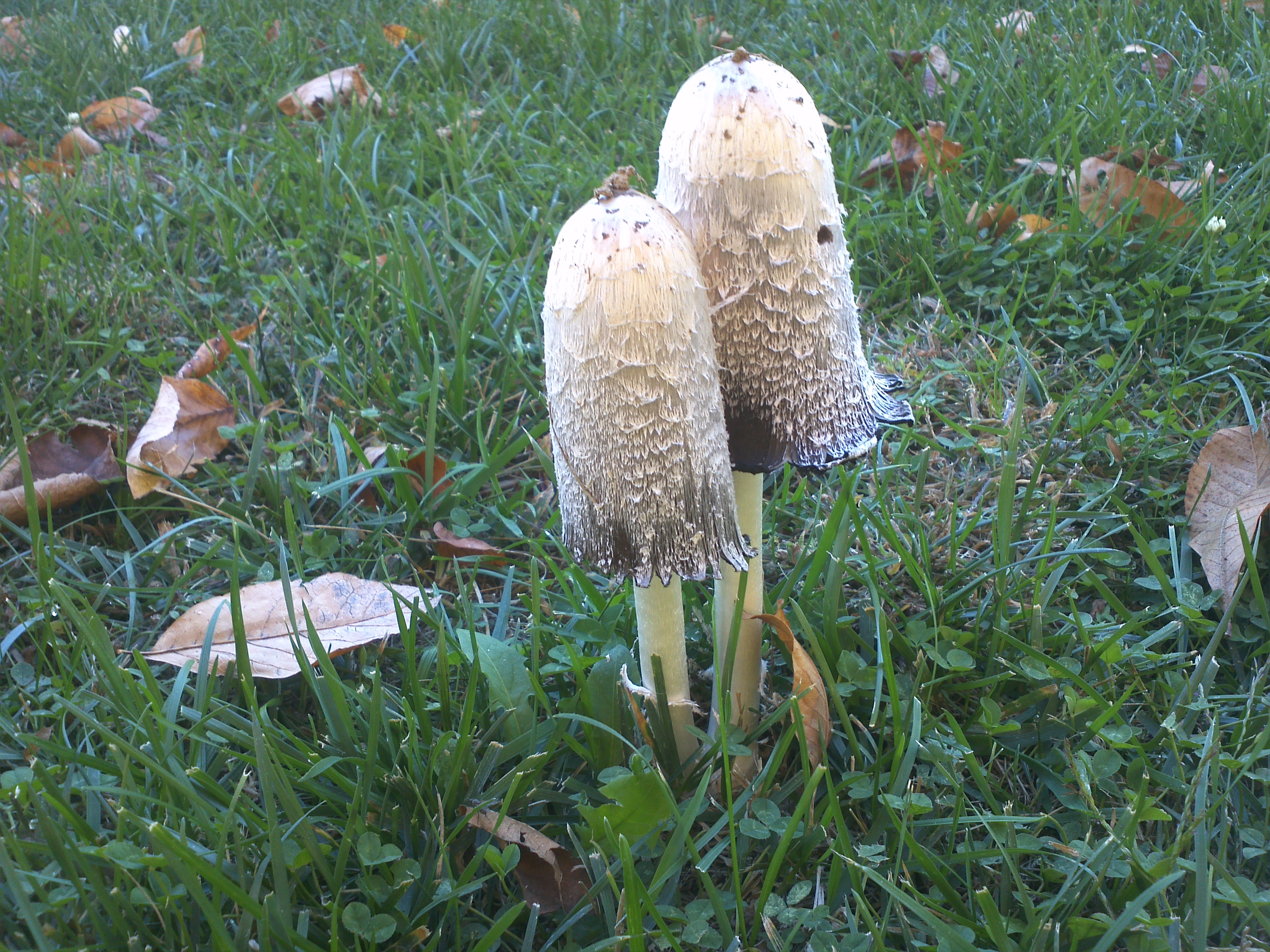
Shaggy Ink Caps (Coprinus comatus)

The arboretum's primary scientific collection is a quercetum (oak collection) comprising one of the most comprehensive living reference collections for the genus in North America. More than 200 other genera of woody plants are also available for study, as well as native forest areas, herb and perennial landscapes, a native prairie garden, several provenance tests, aquatic areas, and conifer plantations. The arboretum contains approximately 2500 accessioned woody taxa and 60 species of spontaneous woody plants.

Permanent records include provenance information, propagation method and year, and mapped location within the arboretum.

== Activities ==
Starhill Forest Arboretum is a Level III ArbNet accredited arboretum. It was one of the first 1,000 arboreta worldwide to achieve certification.

In October 2008, Starhill Forest became the official arboretum of Illinois College. The agreement created a trust and endowment to care for the arboretum. The arboretum has hosted college interns during the summer since 2002. Field trips, classes, tours, and volunteer opportunities are also available to the students.

As it is a private residence, there are currently no regular visiting hours. Guided tours and lectures are available by scheduling an appointment. Volunteers are welcome.

== See also ==
- List of botanical gardens in the United States
