= Julia Franck =

German writer (born 1970)

- Julia Franck at the Frankfurt Book Fair 2026
- Born: 1970 (age 55–56); East Berlin, East Germany
- Occupation: novelist
- Writing career
- Notable work: Die Mittagsfrau
- Notable awards: German Book Prize; 2007
- Website: www.juliafranck.de

Julia Franck (born 1970, in East Berlin) is a German writer.

== Life ==
Julia Franck, a twin, is the daughter of the actress Anna Katharina Franck and of the television producer Jürgen Sehmisch.

In 1978 the family moved to West Berlin where they spent nine months in a refugee camp. She grew up in Schleswig-Holstein. Franck studied German Literature and American Studies at the Free University of Berlin and spent some time in the United States, Mexico and Guatemala. She worked as an editor for Sender Freies Berlin and contributed to various newspapers and magazines. She lives with her children in Berlin.

== Literary works ==
Franck is the author of five novels and one short story collection, and the editor of a collection of essays. Her three most recent novels, Lagerfeuer, Die Mittagsfrau, and Rücken an Rücken, as well as the collection Grenzübergänge, engage explicitly with twentieth-century German history. Lagerfeuer is set in the West Berlin refugee camp Berlin-Marienfelde in the 1970s and follows four main characters, one of whom, Nelly Senff, has fled East Berlin with her two young children. Rücken an Rücken is also set during the years of Germany's division, ending in the early 1960s, and Die Mittagsfrau spans from World War I to divided Germany of the 1950s.

Although Franck has not described herself as a feminist author, feminist scholars have noted her presentation of women's experience of history, power structures, sexuality, and relationships (such as motherhood).

Franck's books have been translated into over 35 languages.

== Family connections ==
Franck is the granddaughter of sculptor Ingeborg Hunzinger (1915–2009) and a great great granddaughter of the artist and illustrator Philipp Franck (1860–1944).

== Awards and honours ==
- 1995 Open Mike prize of the Literaturwerkstatt Berlin
- 1998 Alfred-Döblin-Stipendium of the Akademie der Künste
- 2000 3sat award of the Ingeborg Bachmann competition
- 2004 Marie Luise Kaschnitz Prize
- 2005 Roswitha Prize of the city of Bad Gandersheim
- 2007 German Book Prize
- 2010 short list for the Independent Foreign Fiction Prize for Blind Side of the Heart
- 2010 short list for the Wingate Literary Prize for the Jewish Quarterly
- 2022 Schiller Memorial Prize

=== Memberships ===
- 2022 PEN Berlin

== Works ==
- Franck, Julia (2001). Liebediener : Roman (in German). München: Deutscher Taschenbuch Verlag. ISBN 3-423-12904-2. OCLC 63518768.
- —— (2000). Bauchlandung : Geschichten zum Anfassen (in German). Köln: DuMont. ISBN 3-7701-5365-0. OCLC 45304729.
- —— (2005). Lagerfeuer : Roman (in German). München: Deutscher Taschenbuch. ISBN 3-423-13303-1. OCLC 184954219.
- —— (2006). Mir nichts, dir nichts (in German). Köln: DuMont. ISBN 978-3-8321-7969-4. OCLC 77562392.
- —— (2007). Die Mittagsfrau : Roman (in German). Frankfurt am Main: S. Fischer. ISBN 978-3-10-022600-6. OCLC 173070893.
- —— (2009). Grenzübergänge : Autoren aus Ost und West erinnern sich (in German). Frankfurt am Main: S. Fischer. ISBN 978-3-10-022604-4. OCLC 317504386.
- —— (2011). Rücken an Rücken Roman (in German). Frankfurt, M: S. Fischer. ISBN 978-3-10-022605-1. OCLC 734095432.
- ——; Blomberg, Katja (2017). Blaues Licht Fragmente einer erhofften Begegnung = Blue light (in German). Köln: Verlag der Buchhandlung Walther König. ISBN 978-3-96098-099-5. OCLC 981918644.
- —— (2021). Welten auseinander (in German). Frankfurt am Main: S. Fischer Verlag GmbH. ISBN 978-3-10-002438-1. OCLC 1248721437.

=== English translations ===
- Franck, Julia; Bell, Anthea (2009). The blind side of the heart. London [England]: Harvill Secker. ISBN 978-1-84655-212-0. OCLC 310157526.
  - ——; Bell, Anthea (2009). The blindness of the heart. New York: Grove Press. ISBN 978-0-8021-1967-4. OCLC 587153851.
- ——; Bell, Anthea (2013). Back to back. New York: Grove Press. ISBN 978-0-8021-2167-7. OCLC 862463363.
- ——; Bell, Anthea (2015). West. London: Harvill Secker. ISBN 978-0-09-955432-5. OCLC 951147491.

== Translations ==
- Solnit, Rebecca; Franck, Julia (2014). Aus der nahen Ferne (in German). Hamburg: Hoffmann und Campe. ISBN 978-3-455-50324-1. OCLC 867153725.

== Film adaptions ==
- West (German: Westen, director: Christian Schwochow), a 2013 German film adaptation of the novel Lagerfeuer.
