= Das iPhone Konzert 2010 =

Live album by Kreidler
- Released: 2011
- Recorded: 2010
- Genre: Electronic
- Length: 17:30
- Label: NRW Forum
- Producer: Kreidler

Kreidler chronology
Mosaik 2014 (2011)	Das iPhone Konzert 2010 (2011)	Tank (2011)

Das iPhone Konzert 2010 is a limited album by electronica group Kreidler, released in January 2011. The album contains live recordings from a concert at NRW Forum Düsseldorf on May 8, 2010.

== Track listing ==
1. Untitled – 0:43
2. Untitled – 4:32
3. Untitled – 3:14
4. Untitled – 7:38
5. Untitled – 1:10

== Personnel ==
- Thomas Klein – iPhone
- Andreas Reihse – iPhone
- Detlef Weinrich – iPhone

With liner notes by Andreas Reihse.

== Release ==
Special Edition Cd. Annual bonus for friends and supporters of NRW-Forum Düsseldorf, not on sale.

== Cover artwork ==
Handcrafted, comes in a cloth cover, with a colour photocopy stuck to the frontside, and liner notes stuck to the inside.
