= Andrea Wulf =

German-British historian and writer (born 1967)

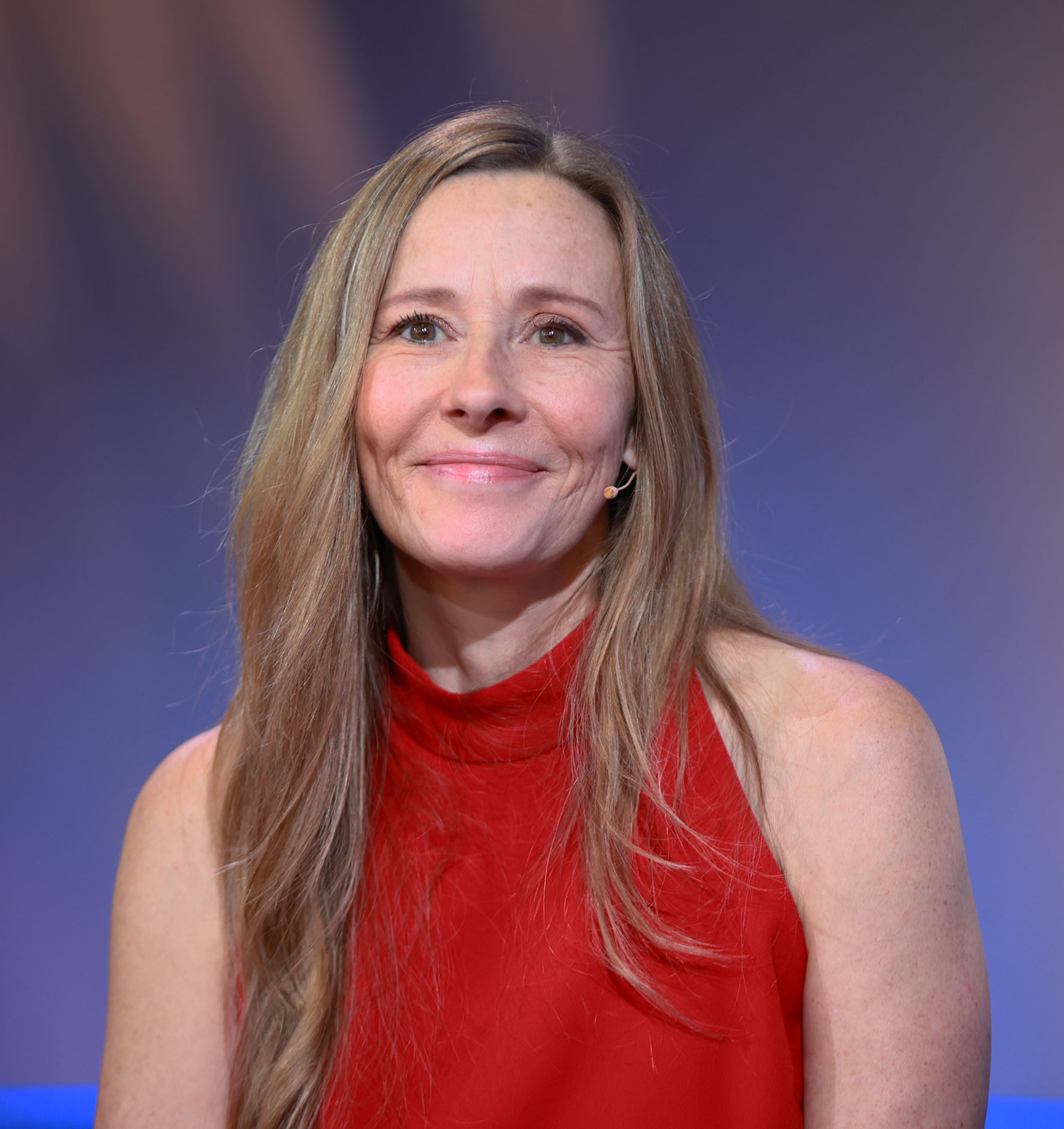
- Andrea Wulf at Frankfurt Book Fair, 2022
- Born: 1967 (age 58–59); New Delhi, India
- Occupation: Writer
- Writing career
- Genre: Non-fiction
- Notable works: The Brother Gardeners, This Other Eden, Founding Gardeners, Chasing Venus, The Invention of Nature: Alexander Humboldt's New World

Andrea Wulf (born 1967) is a German-British historian and writer who has written books, newspaper articles and book reviews.

== Biography ==
Wulf was born in New Delhi, India, a child of German developmental aid workers, and spent the first five years of her life there, then grew up in Hamburg. She studied first at the University of Lüneburg, and then design history at the Royal College of Art, London.

Wulf is a public speaker, delivering lectures in the UK and USA. She was the guest speaker at the Kitt Peak National Observatory.

Her book The Brother Gardeners was long-listed for the Samuel Johnson Prize and received a CBHL Annual Literature Award in 2010. In 2016, she won the Royal Society Insight Investment Science Book Prize and the Royal Geographical Society's Ness Award for her book The Invention of Nature. The book had already won the Costa Biography Award in 2015.

Wulf was elected a Fellow of the Royal Society of Literature in 2018.

She was a judge for the 2023 Baillie Gifford prize for non-fiction.

== Chasing Venus: the Race to Measure the Heavens ==
Chasing Venus: the Race to Measure the Heavens (2012) is a non-fiction book about expeditions of scientists who set off around the world in 1761 and 1769 to collect data relating to the transit of Venus and thereby to measure and understand better the universe. The narrative style provides glimpses into the personalities of those involved, their aims and obsessions, their failures and discoveries, and provides the historic context of the period in the 18th century when modern-day scientifically accurate mapping and international scientific collaboration began.

== The Invention of Nature ==
The Invention of Nature: Alexander von Humboldt's New World (2015) is a non-fiction book about the Prussian naturalist, explorer and geographer Alexander von Humboldt. Wulf makes the case that Humboldt synthesised knowledge from many different fields to form a vision of nature as one interconnected system, that would go on to influence scientists, activists and the public.

== Selected works ==
- This Other Eden: Seven Great Gardens and 300 Years of English History, Little, Brown, 2005, ISBN 978-0-316-72580-4
- The Brother Gardeners: Botany, Empire and the Birth of an Obsession, William Heinemann, 2008, ISBN 978-0-434-01612-9
- The Founding Gardeners: How the Revolutionary Generation Created an American Eden, William Heinemann, 2011, ISBN 978-0-434-01910-6
- Chasing Venus: The Race to Measure the Heavens, William Heinemann, 2012, ISBN 978-0-434-02108-6
- The Invention of Nature: The Adventures of Alexander von Humboldt the Lost Hero of Science, Hodder & Stoughton, 2015, ISBN 978-1-848-54898-5
- The Adventures of Alexander Von Humboldt, Pantheon, 2019 (co-authored with Lillian Melcher – illustrator) ISBN 978-1-524-74737-4
- Magnificent Rebels: The First Romantics and the Invention of the Self, John Murray, 2022, ISBN 978-1-529-39274-6
- The Traveller: The Revolutionary Life of George Forster and His Search for Humanity. Allen Lane. 2026. ISBN 9780241711217.
  - In German as Der Reisende. Georg Forster und die Entdeckung der Menschlichkeit, Bertelsmann ISBN 978-3570105580
