= The Invention of Nature =

2015 biography of Alexander von Humboldt by Andrea Wulf

- First edition (US)
- Author: Andrea Wulf
- Language: English
- Subject: Biography
- Genre: Non-fiction
- Publisher: Knopf (US); John Murray (UK)
- Publication date: September 2015
- Pages: 496 pp.
- ISBN: 978-0385350662

The Invention of Nature: Alexander von Humboldt's New World is a non-fiction book released in 2015, by the historian Andrea Wulf about the Prussian naturalist, explorer and geographer Alexander von Humboldt. The book follows Humboldt from his early childhood and travels through Europe as a young man to his journey through Latin America and his return to Europe. Wulf makes the case that Humboldt synthesized knowledge from many different fields to form a vision of nature as one interconnected system, that would go on to influence scientists, activists and the public.

== Sections ==
Part 1. Departure: Emerging Ideas Wulf describes Humboldt's childhood with his emotionally distant mother. As a child his interests in nature and travel were not taken seriously. His mother, on whom he was financially dependent, insisted he become a civil servant. As a young man, Humboldt became friends with Goethe and other German intellectuals. His mother's death allowed him the freedom and financial independence needed to journey to the New World.

Part 2 Arrival: Collecting Ideas

Humboldt arrives in Venezuela with his companion Bonpland and begins his journey through Central and South America. He brought with him a plethora of scientific instruments. He chronicles his travels and the measurements he obtained using scientific instruments in his journals. Humboldt climbs Chimborazo, a volcano in the Andes, which was then believed to be highest mountain in the world. The trip concludes with his visit to the United States where he visited the White House to discuss science and politics with Thomas Jefferson before returning to Europe.

Part 3 Return: Sorting Ideas

Humboldt returns to Europe where he is greeted as a celebrity. He lives as an expat in Paris for seven months as he finds the city and its scientific culture more stimulating than that of Berlin. While in France, he meets a young Simon Bolivar, who is impressed with Humboldt's knowledge and passion for his home country of Venezuela, and they discuss South American politics. Humboldt returns to Prussia, to earn a salary in the court of King Frederick William III of Prussia before returning to Paris. At this point he begins to work on several manuscripts based on his travels. The books are widely read. As Bolivar begins to plan and execute revolutions in South America, Humboldt publishes a series of books on the politics of Latin America that criticize colonialism.

Part 4 New Worlds: Spreading Ideas

Wulf discusses Humboldt's personal correspondence and influence on a young Charles Darwin, who attributed to Humboldt the inspiration for an interest in natural science leading to his voyage on the Beagle. Humboldt's influence on the American poet and philosopher Henry David Thoreau is explored. Humboldt's magnum opus Cosmos, where he talks of the interconnections of the natural world, is discussed.

== Reception ==
Invention of Nature became a New York Times bestseller and was praised in Literary Review as "a dazzling account of Humboldt’s restless search for scientific, emotional and aesthetic satisfaction." Some critics felt that the book could have covered Humboldt and his travels more thoroughly instead of focusing on people he influenced. Others found that the book showed the relevance of Humboldt to our times. In 2015, the book won the Costa Award for Biography. In September 2016, the book was awarded the Royal Society Insight Investment Science Book Prize.

In his Alexander von Humboldt: A Concise Biography (2024) and a series of articles, historian Andreas Daum proposes an interpretation of Humboldt that differs significantly from Wulf’s. Like Wulf, Daum views Humboldt as a seminal figure. He, too, highlights his achievements. But Daum cautions against “taking Humboldt out of his epoch and portraying him as a singular intellect way ahead of his time”, as Wulf suggests. According to Daum, such heroizing tendencies fuel an “Humboldt exceptionalism” that does not do justice to Humboldt’s identity as a man struggling to secure knowledge in turbulent times. This exceptionalism underestimates the social and intellectual connections Humboldt cultivated, and it neglects the historical context from which he emerged. Daum also warns against boldly projecting today’s legitimate anti-colonial critique onto Humboldt. He advocates for critically examining the contradictions in Humboldt’s life and work without vilifying him, arriving at a balanced account.

A recent, comparative review of both books calls Daum, a professor of history, a “bit more qualified” to approach Humboldt and praises his “nuanced picture of Humboldt.” It appreciates Wulf’s appealing, though overly detailed narrative. The review calls Daum’s shorter, but more succinct book “less fluff, more facts.”
