= Ooi Kee Beng =

Personal life

Dato' Dr Ooi Kee Beng (Chinese: 黄基明; Pe̍h-ōe-jī: Ûiⁿ Ki-bêng; pinyin: Huáng Jīmíng) is a political historian, writer, and executive director of Penang Institute. He is the founder-editor of the Penang Monthly as well as other publications of the Penang Institute, and a columnist for The Edge Malaysia. After being conferred with the honour of Officer of the Order of the Defender of State, his name is usually prefixed with Dato.

== Early life and education ==
Ooi Kee Beng (b. 31 May 1955) was born and raised in Penang.

He first attended La Salle School (Air Itam), then St. Xavier's Institution, and did his A-levels at Methodist High School.

He worked for The Star and The Straits Echo for several years before leaving for Sweden to study.

He has a PhD from Stockholm University in sinology.

== Career ==
Ooi worked at Ericsson in Stockholm for 22 years, while studying for at the university. He also taught courses, including included Chinese history and philosophy.

He was visiting associate professor at the City University of Hong Kong from 2009 to 2012 and adjunct associate professor at the National University of Singapore's Department of Southeast Asian Studies from 2009 to 2011.

He joined Singapore's Institute of Southeast Asian Studies (now ISEAS–Yusof Ishak Institute) in 2004, becoming its deputy director from 2011 to 2017. He has since at least 2021 been visiting senior fellow at that Institute.

In 2017, Ooi was appointed executive director of Penang Institute.

As of February 2021 he was senior fellow at Jeffrey Cheah Institute on Southeast Asia at Sunway University in Subang, Selangor, and adjunct professor at Taylor's College, Selangor.

His academic interests include language philosophy and Ancient Chinese political and strategic thinking.

== Writing ==
Ooi is the founder-editor of the Penang Monthly, ISSUES (Penang Institute) and Monographs (Penang Institute); and ISEAS Perspective (ISEAS). He is also editor of Trends in Southeast Asia. As of 2025 he is managing editor of Penang Monthly.

He also writes opinion pieces in mass media on Malaysian and regional matters, and has written many articles for the Malaysian business newspaper The Edge.

He has written several biographies on important political personalities of Malaysia and Singapore, such as Tun Dr Ismail, Lim Kit Siang, H. S. Lee, Yusof Ishak, and Goh Keng Swee.

He has also translated several classical Chinese "war manuals" into Swedish for the first time, including Sunzi's Art of War, Wuzi's Art of War and Weiliaozi's Art of War.

His books have won the following awards:

- Award of Excellence for Best writing published in book form or any aspect of Asia (Non-fiction) at the Asian Publishing Convention Awards 2008, for The Reluctant Politician: Tun Dr Ismail and His Time (ISEAS 2007)
- Top Academic Work, awarded in 2008 by ASEAN Book Publishers Association (ABPA) for Continent, Coast, Ocean: Dynamics of Regionalism in Eastern Asia (ATMA & ISEAS, 2007), co-edited with Ding Choo Ming

== Honours ==
- In 2017, Ooi was made an Officer of the Order of the Defender of State (DSPN) – Dato (2017)
- In 2017 Ooi was conferred a Darjah Setia Pangkuan Negeri (DSPN), which carries the title Dato', by the Governor of Penang, Abdul Rahman Abbas.

== Penang Institute ==
The Penang Institute was established in 1997 as the Socio-economic and Environmental Research Institute (SERI), funded by the Government of Penang. It was rebranded as Penang Institute in 2011, "to secure Penang's reputation as an intellectual hub and as the culture capital of the country, and to enhance Penang's reputation in ASEAN and beyond".

Its main objectives are:

- To contribute towards making public policy-making in Penang and in Malaysia as informed and collaborative as possible
- To provide platforms for intellectual and professional exchanges on critical, current and strategic issues affecting Penang and its surrounding region
- To promote interest in Penang's cultural activities, and specifically in literary pursuits
- To aid academic research in general through the maintenance of a resource centre

The institute undertakes research programmes; issues many publications (including public policy briefs, ISSUES, Monographs, Penang Monthly); broadcasts a podcast featuring interviews with notable people; and runs lecture series. Its three research programmes are: Socioeconomics & Statistics; Urban & Heritage Studies; and History & Regional Studies. It also offers consultancy services and hire of its facilities.

The Penang Institute also runs the George Town Literary Festival.

== Selected publications ==
- As Empires Fell: The Life and Times of Lee Hau-Shik (2020)
- Month by Month (2019)
- Catharsis: A Second Chance for Democracy in Malaysia (2018)
- Yusof Ishak: A Man of Many Firsts (2017)
- The Eurasian Core & Its Edges: Dialogues with Wang Gungwu on the History of the World (2015)
- Merdeka for the Mind. Essays on Malaysian Struggles in the 21st Century (2015) (Editor)
- The Third ASEAN Reader (2015) (editor)
- Done Making Do: 1Party Rule Ends in Malaysia (Genta Media & ISEAS 2013)
- The Right to Differ: A Biographical Sketch of Lim Kit Siang (2011)
- In Lieu of Ideology: An Intellectual Biography of Goh Keng Swee (2010)
- Malaya's First Year at the United Nations (2009) (Co-edited with Tawfik Ismail)
- March 8: Eclipsing May 13 (2008) (Co-authored with Johan Saravanamuttu & Lee Hock Guan)
- The Reluctant Politician: Tun Dr Ismail and His Time (2007)
- Continent, Coast, Ocean: Dynamics of Regionalism in Eastern Asia (2007) (Co-editor)
- Sunzi's krigskonst (Sunzi's Art of War) 1995
- Wuzi's krigskonst (Wuzi's Art of War) 1996
- Weliaozi's krigskonst (Weiliaozi's Art of War) 1997
