= Bernice Chauly =

Malaysian writer

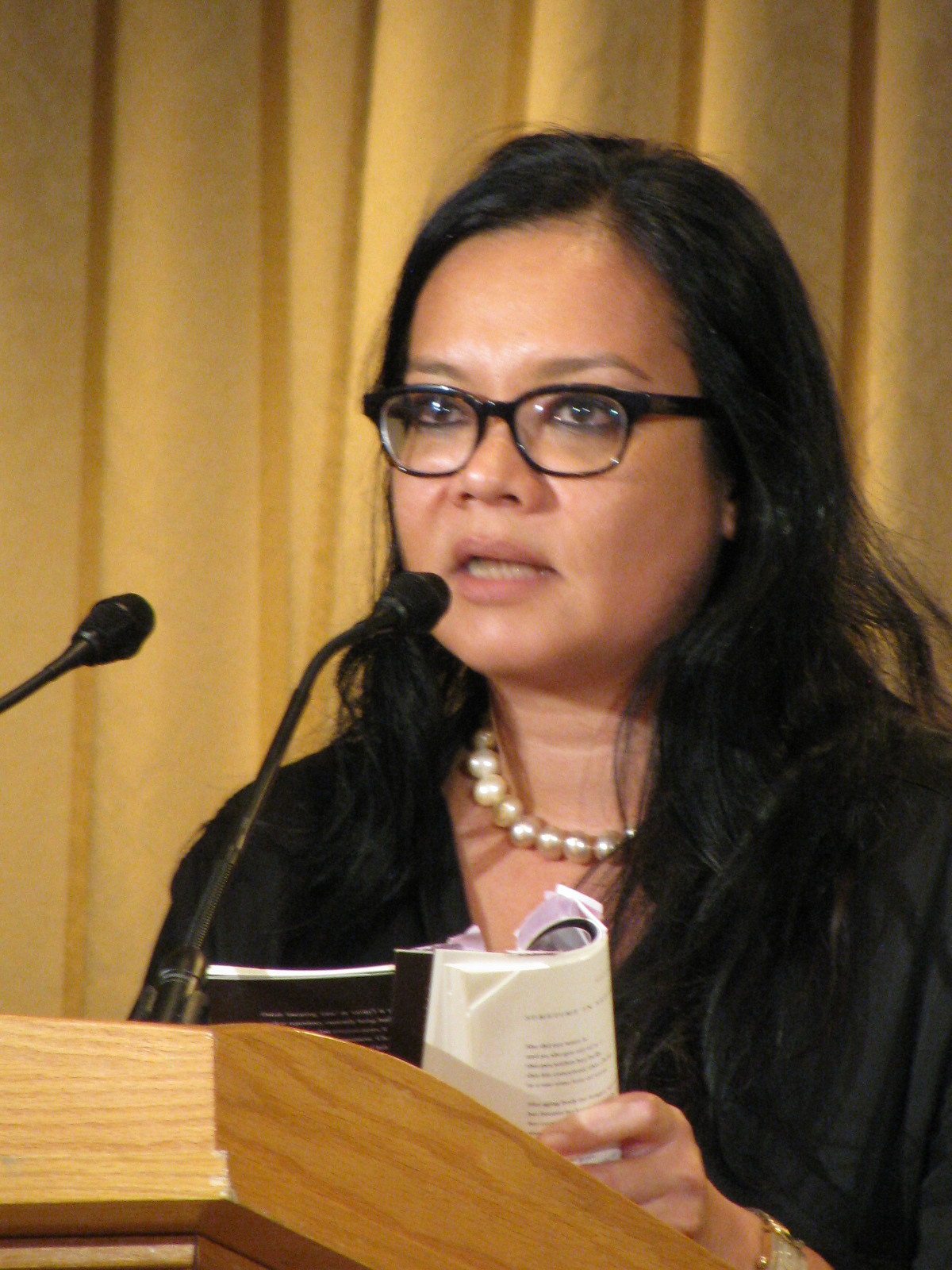
- Born: 1968 (age 57–58); George Town, Penang
- Occupations: Writer, poet, educator, actor, photographer and filmmaker
- Writing career
- Notable awards: Honorary Fellow in Writing, The International Writing Program (IWP) University of Iowa, USA; 2014 Winner, Reader's Choice Awards, Non-Fiction Category for Growing Up With Ghosts; 2012; Winner of Samsung's Ultra Honour Award; 2006; Neu Woman Achievers Award; 2005 Winner of the 'Literary Festival Award' at London Book Fair; 2018
- Website: bernicechauly.com

Bernice Chauly (born 1968, Georgetown, Penang) is a Malaysian writer, poet, educator, festival director, actor, photographer and filmmaker.

== Biography ==
Born to a Chindian teacher couple, she read Education and English Literature at the University of Winnipeg, Canada as a government scholar.

She is the author of seven books, which include poetry and prose; going there and coming back (1997), The Book of Sins (2008), Lost in KL (2008), the acclaimed memoir Growing Up With Ghosts (2011) which won in the Popular Readers’ Choice Awards 2012 in the Non-Fiction Category, Onkalo (2013), her third collection of poems which Nobel laureate J.M Coetzee has said is "direct, honest and powerful", Once We Were There (2017) published by Epigram Books, Incantations/Incarcerations (2019) published by Gerakbudaya.

In 1998, she began organising literary events in Kuala Lumpur and in 2005, founded Readings, the longest-running live literary platform in Kuala Lumpur. In 2011, she was Festival Director for the Writers Unlimited Tour Kuala Lumpur/Makassar and is the Festival Director of the George Town Literary Festival in Penang (2011 – 2018), the only international literature festival in Malaysia. The festival was awarded The Literary Festival Award at the London Book Fair (2019). The award judges stated that "the GTLF stands outs a vibrant, diverse and brave festival that engages with a wide community of voices, speaking to the world from a complex region." She was also the co-curator of at Read My World International Literature Festival Amsterdam (2015). In 2018, Chauly formed PEN Malaysia and was nominated as Director in 2019. PEN Malaysia aims to uphold freedoms of speech and expression in Malaysia and to conduct key events to foster literacy and the love of literature amongst its multicultural society.

She was a resident at the University of Iowa's International Writing Program in 2014 and is the Founder and Director of the KL Writers Workshop. She currently teaches creative writing at the University of Nottingham Malaysia Campus. For over 20 years, she worked extensively in the creative industries and won multiple awards for her work and her contribution to the arts in Malaysia.

== Bibliography ==
- (2019) Incantations/Incarcerations (Poetry). Gerakbudaya. 2019. ISBN 9789670311418.
- (2017) Once We Were There (Novel). Epigram Books. 2017. ISBN 9789814785167.
- (2013) Onkalo (Poetry). Math Paper Press. 2013. ISBN 978-9810776725.
- (2011) Growing Up With Ghosts (Memoir). Matahari Books. 2011. ISBN 978-9834484583.
- (2008) Lost in KL (Short Stories). Oxygen. 2018. ISBN 9789834403959.
- (2008) The Book of Sins (Poetry). Mulut Mata. 2008. ISBN 978-9834381004.
- (1997) Going There and Coming Back (Poetry). Rhino Press. 1997. ISBN 978-9839476088.
