= Mosaik 2014 =

Studio album by Kreidler
- Released: 2009
- Recorded: 2008
- Genre: Electronic
- Length: 51:19
- Label: italic
- Producer: Kreidler

Kreidler chronology
Eve Future Recall (2004)	Mosaik 2014 (2009)	Das iPhone Konzert 2010 (2011)

Mosaik 2014 is a full length studio album by electronica group Kreidler, released in October 2009. The album contains 10 songs on the CD version, and 8 on the vinyl version. It was the first release of the band after a hiatus of 5 years.

== Production ==
The album was recorded in March 2008 in a garage of artist Rosemarie Trockel in Cologne, Mixed by the band at Tußmann St., re-mixed with Ralf Beck, and mastered by Emanuel Geller. It was released on 5. October 2009 on Berlin based label italic. Cover artwork is by Detlef Weinrich.

Impressions d'Afrique was released as a single in January 2010 on 12" vinyl, containing an extended version of the song and a re-mix by Ralf Beck.

== Reception ==
Mosaik 2014 gained mostly positive reviews. In German press it became record of the issue in Spex magazine (9/10 2009) and Groove magazine (#120, 9/10 2009), record of the week in Titel magazine and on radio-program Zündfunk (Bayerischer Rundfunk).

Richard Brophy wrote in DJ Magazine "German experimentalists bypass the 21st century, creating a musical zone that unites the 20th and the 22nd centuries on a sun drenched, achingly slow disco trip that navigates between glacial synths and Afro drums." In UK magazine The Clash Charlie Frame described the music as "mossy culture multiplying on a bed of wires and computer chips" and the band's aesthetic as "petrol punk (…) that fuses IDM, industrial, African rhythms, Kafka, Godard and Giger with something altogether more futuristic than the sum of its parts." Boomkat stated: "An engrossing and entirely out-of-its-time album from an always intriguing fixture of the German leftfield." American journalist Philip Sherburne wrote on eMusic "both rhythmic slippage and rubbery room tone point to "real" instruments in "real" space and time, a matrix whose shorthand is "rock 'n' roll." But synthesizers, electronic effects and the very fabric of the music itself always pulls the live-band fantasy back inside a different kind of logic: an ideal form mapped to an infinitesimally pixellated grid. It's hard to put your finger on, but you can feel it, and that's precisely what gives the record its charge: humans imitating machines imitating humans, or maybe the other way round.". Milkfactory rated the album 4.3/5: "(…) their most potent and robust record to date".

== Music videos ==
Two official music videos exist, both based on Impressions d'Afrique. The album-trailer directed by Detlef Weinrich intercuts a rotating, flexing cube and pictures of the Iveria hotel Tbilisi (then a refugee home), while the silhouette-like black and white video of Jörg Langkau intertwines imaginary from Africa with abstract geometrical elements.

== Track listing ==
CD
No.	Title	Length
1.	"Mosaik"	6:15
2.	"Zero"	5:02
3.	"Marauder"	6:45
4.	"Brass Cannon"	4:25
5.	"High Wichita"	6:29
6.	"European Grey"	5:00
7.	"Doom Boys"	6:17
8.	"Impressions d'Afrique"	6:33
9.	"Luminous Procuress"	4:23
10.	"(untitled)"	0:10

Vinyl - Orange side
No.	Title	Length
1.	"Mosaik"	6:15
2.	"Zero"	5:02
3.	"Marauder"	6:45
4.	"Brass Cannon"	4:25

Vinyl - Red Side
No.	Title	Length
1.	"High Wichita"	6:29
2.	"European Grey"	5:00
3.	"Doom Boys"	6:17
4.	"Impressions d'Afrique"	6:33

== Personnel ==
- Thomas Klein
- Andreas Reihse
- Detlef Weinrich
