= Würth-Literaturpreis =

German literary award

The Würth-Literaturpreis was a German literary prize from 1996 to 2019 and was awarded a total of 30 times.
