= Guy Sternberg =

American arborist

Guy Sternberg (born 1947) is the owner and operator of Starhill Forest Arboretum in Petersburg, Illinois. He is an arborist, author of books on oaks and is a founding member of the International Oak Society, tree consultant, and lecturer.

== Biography ==
Sternberg served on the staff of the Illinois Department of Natural Resources for 32 years, receiving the Honor Award for outstanding service. He has been granted an adjunct research appointment to the Illinois State Museum Botany Department and an adjunct faculty position in Biology at Illinois College. Sternberg is a charter life member and past chapter president of the Illinois Native Plant Society. He also holds life memberships in the International Society of Arboriculture (from which he received a Special Recognition Award for his work with historic trees), the International Dendrology Society, and American Forests. Sternberg is a founding life member, past president, and past journal editor for the International Oak Society, with members from more than 35 countries on six continents, and received their Lifetime Service Award in 2003. He received the Bellrose Award from the Illinois State Journal-Register in 2009 for his lifetime achievements in natural resources.

Sternberg has cultivated and studied trees since 1952 and has assembled one of the largest PCN oak genus (Quercus) living reference collections for North America at Starhill Forest, his research arboretum. He has developed and introduced more than 30 tree cultivars. He and his wife Edie grow more than 2500 accessioned taxa of woody plants at Starhill Forest. The arboretum is described in the American Association of Museums Directory, the American Horticultural Society's North American Horticulture Reference Guide, and Jacobs' Gardens of North America and Hawaii, and was featured in the 1994 educational film The Greenday Kids Learn About Trees and a 2007 PBS special for Illinois Stories, WSEC TV. It was one of 30 worldwide arboreta featured in the New Trees book compiled in 2009 by John Grimshaw for the International Dendrology Society, and has been dedicated in trust to Illinois College.

Guy has successfully nominated 51 current or former state champion trees in Illinois, six national champions, and a few more in Texas, Nebraska, and New Mexico, and has worked with the National Famous and Historic Tree Program to promote awareness and appreciation of special and historic trees. He has consulted on tree management for the Illinois Office of the Attorney General, the Illinois Department of Agriculture, the Illinois Department of Military Affairs, the Illinois Secretary of State, the Illinois Capital Development Board, the Illinois Supreme Court, the US Air Force, the National Park Service, and numerous communities. He has traveled widely studying trees and their habitats and participated in educational exchanges with the national dendrology societies of Germany and Belgium, the TEMA Foundation of Turkey, the Kunming Institute of Botany in China, and arboreta throughout North America, Europe, and Latin America.

Sternberg has served as an honorary director for Wild Ones: Natural Landscapes, lectures frequently for various colleges, trade and professional organizations, and other institutions, and is very active in the preservation of historic trees. His public service work includes helping the Illinois Capital City of Springfield as the tree consultant and propagator for special trees and has donated more than 700 trees for Oak Ridge Cemetery, the setting of President Abraham Lincoln's Tomb. His work there has been registered as a National Living Memorial Site by the US Forest Service.

Sternberg has provided papers and photographs for American Nurseryman, Arborist News, Tree Care Industry, American Homestyle and Gardening, Wildflower, Midwest Living, Garden Gate, American Horticulturist, Oak News and Notes, Weedpatch Gazette, American Gardener, Landscape Architecture, Fine Gardening, Country Woman, Old House Journal, Organic Gardening, Great Plants, and Chicagoland Gardening. He has published scientific papers in International Oaks (the journal of the International Oak Society, for which he also has served as editor), the International Plant Propagators Society Proceedings, the New York State Museum Bulletin, and the French Bulletin de l' Association des Parcs Botaniques. He served as English version editor for Chinese Seed Plants of the Big Bend Gorge of Yalu Tsangpo in Southeast Tibet by Hang and Zhou. He performed many technical reviews for the National Arbor Day Foundation's Library of Trees series, and supplied photographs for the US Forest Service Field Guide to Native Oak Species of Eastern North America, the Belgian Guide Illustré des Chenes, and educational posters and web pages produced by the Illinois Department of Natural Resources and the Live Oak Society.

He is the author (with Jim Wilson of The Victory Garden public television series) and photographer for Landscaping with Native Trees. He prepared a comprehensive, 550-page sequel to that volume titled Native Trees for North American Landscapes, released in January 2004, which won national awards from the National Arbor Day Foundation and the Council on Botanical and Horticultural Libraries. His most recent volume in that series, self-published in 2021, is Native Trees of North America. Guy was a contributor to the World List of Threatened Trees project of the World Conservation Monitoring Centre in Cambridge, England (funded by the Government of the Netherlands) and served as a taxonomic reviewer for Quercus in Flora of North America. He is a contributing author and volume editor for the World Compendium of Oaks prepared in Düsseldorf (published in German by the Langeneicker Eichen Archiv). Sternberg also has been a contributor for several volumes in Houghton-Mifflin's Taylor's Guide garden encyclopedia series, including Taylor's Master Guide to Gardening, and for Taunton Press, Ortho, Timber Press, Reader's Digest, Houghton-Mifflin, Meredith, Better Homes & Gardens, and Brooklyn Botanic Garden horticulture books.

== Works ==
- Landscaping With Native Trees: The Northeast, Midwest, Midsouth & Southeast Edition (1996) ISBN 1-881527-66-2.

Sternberg was the principal author (with Jim Wilson of The Victory Garden Public Television series) and photographer.
This is a reference book for natural landscape management.

- Native Trees for North American Landscapes (2004) ISBN 0-88192-607-8

Sternberg prepared a comprehensive, 550-page sequel to the first book, released in January 2004, which has won national awards from the National Arbor Day Foundation and the Council on Botanical and Horticultural Libraries.
