= Latiff Mohidin =

Malaysian modernist painter, sculptor and poet

Abdul Latiff Mohidin or simply Latiff Mohidin (born 1941) is a Malaysian modernist painter, sculptor and poet. He is generally known for his body of paintings, sculptures and writings gathered under the term “Pago Pago” produced largely between 1964 and 1968.

== Early life ==
Latiff Mohidin was born in Lenggeng, Negeri Sembilan, Malaysia with roots in the Minangkabau community of West Sumatra, Indonesia. He received his formal primary education at Kota Raja Malay School in Singapore. His talent in painting later granted him the Deutscher Akademischer Austrauschdienst (DAAD) scholarship to study at the Academy of Arts in Berlin from 1960 until 1964. Later in 1969, the French Ministry of Culture awarded him with a scholarship to study etching in Paris at the Atelier Lacourière-Frélaut, followed by a grant from the Asian Cultural Program of The JDR 3rd Fund (later known as the Asian Cultural Council) for a residency at the Pratt Institute in New York.

Due to his education, he speaks Malay, English and German.

== Career ==
Latiff's passion for painting and drawing was evident from an early age. At 11, he sold his first painting to the then British Commissioner-General for Southeast Asia, Sir Malcolm MacDonald. He later came to be identified as "the magical boy with the gift in his hands" after his first exhibition at the Kota Raja Malay School in Singapore, a school that he attended before he flew to Berlin to further his artistic education.

Upon his return from Germany in 1964, he travelled throughout Indochina and the Malay world, establishing affinities and conversations with avant-garde artists and intellectuals of the time. He sought to connect modern art history, and its mediums such as drawing, painting and writing, to localities beyond Europe and America This moment, which he evokes through the phrase “Pago Pago,” to describe the cosmopolitan yet regionally rooted spirit with which he made art, and called "a Southeast Asian brand of modernism" has found a significant place in writings on Southeast Asian art.

His artistic practice is often linked to his literary activities. He first became recognised as a poet when he published his collection of poems Sungai Mekong in 1971, which has since been translated into multiple languages. Like his art, his poetry is a methodological wandering that resists ideological systems and structures, offering an extended interrogation of the artist's interior world. Many of these thoughts are reflected in GARIS Latiff Mohidin dari titik de titik, a work of immense literary prowess that was first published in 1988. It grapples with the position of vernacular cosmopolitanism within the story of global modernism, which still defaults to Europe. His literary and painterly world is also heavily informed by the writings of Jorge Luis Borges, Chairil Anwar and Johann Wolfgang von Goethe amongst others. Breaking down disciplinary boundaries between the visual and literary, in 2012, Latiff Mohidin published his translation of Goethe's Faust (Part 1), a figure who has fascinated him since his encounter with German literature in the early 1960s.

In 2018, he became the first Southeast Asian artist to be featured at the Centre Pompidou in Paris.
