= Alfred-Döblin-Stipendium =

German literary prize

Alfred-Döblin-Stipendium (or the Alfred Döblin Scholarship, in English) is a literary prize of Germany that has been awarded to Berlin writers since 1985. It was named after the writer Alfred Döblin.

The recipient of the scholarship is selected by a jury of three, composed of one representative each from the Akademie der Künste, PEN Centre Germany, and the Berlin Senate Department for Science, Research and Culture.

Recipients receive a residency for three to twelve months and get paid 1,100 Euros per month during that time. They are required to stay at the Alfred Döblin House in Wewelsfleth.

The purpose of the scholarship is to help emerging writers in Berlin to focus on their literary work.

== Noted scholars ==
- Martin Ahrends
- María Cecilia Barbetta
- Eva Brunner
- Jonas-Philipp Dallmann
- Judith Hermann
- Massum Faryar
- Anja Frisch
- Julia Franck
- Steffen Jacobs
- Martin Jankowski
- Marcus Jensen
- Reinhard Jirgl
- Ingomar von Kieseritzky
- Norbert Kron
- André Kubiczek
- Sebastian Orlac
- Markus Seidel
- Rajvinder Singh
- Anja Tuckermann
- David Wagner
- Michael Wildenhain
- Peter Wawerzinek
- Thomas Weiss
- Ron Winkler
- Thorsten Becker
- Manja Präkels
- Karsten Krampitz
