= Council on Botanical and Horticultural Libraries, Inc. =

The Council on Botanical and Horticultural Libraries, Inc. (CBHL) is a professional organization in the field of botanical and horticultural information services. Its purpose is to initiate and improve communication and coordinate activities and programs of mutual interest and benefit to its membership.

== Mission ==
The Council on Botanical and Horticultural Libraries, Inc. believes in the critical importance of collecting, preserving, and making accessible the accumulated knowledge about plants for present and future generations.

Therefore, CBHL provides an organizational framework and an active forum for institutions and individuals concerned with fostering the advancement of botanical and horticultural information and information services.

The Council on Botanical and Horticultural Libraries, Inc. (CBHL) concerns:

- the collection, preservation and dissemination of botanical and horticultural information.
- an open and flexible organizational environment
- an active and diverse membership
- communication, cooperation and collaboration
- professionalism
- leadership

== History ==
The first meeting of librarians interested in botanical and horticultural literature, was held in Boston in November 1969, sponsored by the Massachusetts Horticultural Society. Forty librarians from 20 institutions attended, and the same group met the following year in Pittsburgh at the Hunt Botanical Library (now the Hunt Institute for Botanical Documentation). At the end of the meeting, the group created The Council on Botanical and Horticultural Libraries.

Since its founding, CBHL has grown to become an international organization of individuals, organizations and institutions concerned with the development, maintenance and use of libraries of botanical and horticultural literature.

== Awards ==
=== CBHL Annual Literature Award for a Significant Work in Botanical or Horticultural Literature ===
Created in 2000, the CBHL Annual Literature Award is given by CBHL to both the author and publisher of a work that makes a significant contribution to the literature of botany or horticulture. The award is presented at CBHL's Annual Meeting and its purpose is to:

- Recognize a work that makes a significant contribution to the literature of botany or horticulture
- Increase the visibility of CBHL
- Encourage participation by the CBHL community in recognizing significant contributions to the literature of the field

==== 2010 Honorees ====
Technical category

- Ireland's Wild Orchids: a Field Guide by Brendan Sayers and Susan Sex - published by the authors in 2008.

General Interest category

- The Brother Gardeners: Botany, Empire, and the Birth of an Obsession by Andrea Wulf - published by Knopf in 2009.

=== Charles Robert Long Award of Extraordinary Merit ===
The Charles Robert Long Award of Extraordinary Merit was the first and is the highest individual honor CBHL bestows. Created by CBHL members at the 1987 annual meeting, this award honors the memory of Bob Long, member and a former president of CBHL, editor of the CBHL Plant Bibliography series, and was for years on the staff of The New York Botanical Garden. This award was inspired by Long's commitment to professional development, his support of high library and bibliographic standards, his interest in the collaborative efforts of libraries, and his continued search for professionalism in librarianship. The Charles Robert Long Award honors outstanding contributions and meritorious service to CBHL or to the field of botanical and horticultural libraries or literature.

=== Founders' Fund Travel Fellowship Award ===
The Travel Fellowship was established in 1991 by CBHL with an initial grant from a CBHL member and was created as a memorial honoring past members. Income from memorial gifts is granted to applicants each year who request assistance to attend the annual meeting.
