= European Song (album) =

Studio album by Kreidler
- Released: 7 April 2017
- Recorded: Recording: 21 November 2016, Uhrwald Orange Hilden assisted by Sebastian Lee Philipp, Mixing: November 2016, at Paulick Saal Berlin, 13 Floor Elevator Berlin, and Spree Park Studios
- Genre: Electronic
- Length: 35:33
- Label: Bureau-B
- Producer: Kreidler

Kreidler chronology
ABC (2014)	European Song (2017)	Flood (2019)

Professional ratings
Review scores
Source	Rating
AllMusic	3.5/5 stars

European Song is an album by electronica group Kreidler, released in April 2017.

== Production ==
The album was recorded in a one-day session, to replace an already finished album the band withdraw after Donald Trump won the US presidential elections.

The recording session took place in Ralf Beck's studio Uhrwald Orange in Hilden, North Rhine-Westphalia, on 21 November 2016, assisted by Sebastian Lee Philipp. Mixing took place at Paulick Saal Berlin, 13 Floor Elevator Berlin, and Spree Park Studios. Mastering and vinyl cut at Manmade Mastering Berlin by Mike Grinser.

== Artwork ==
The cover artwork is by artist Rosemarie Trockel. The front cover depicts a chocked up Trans Am in an urban surrounding, coloured gold by the artist. The back cover is a black-and-white photograph showing destroyed parts of a house. The inner sleeve of the vinyl version (respectively the booklet of the CD) and the labels depict more (untitled) artworks by Trockel.

A limited edition of 500 copies of the vinyl version came with golden overprinting on the cover and golden vinyl pressing.

== Track listing ==
Side one
No.	Title	Length
1.	"Boots"	5:31
2.	"Kannibal"	5:44
3.	"Coulées"	6:09

Side two
No.	Title	Length
4.	"Radio Island"	12:53
5.	"No God"	5:12

== Personnel ==
Kreidler

- Thomas Klein
- Alexander Paulick
- Andreas Reihse
- Detlef Weinrich
