= Zaza Rusadze =

Georgian-German filmmaker

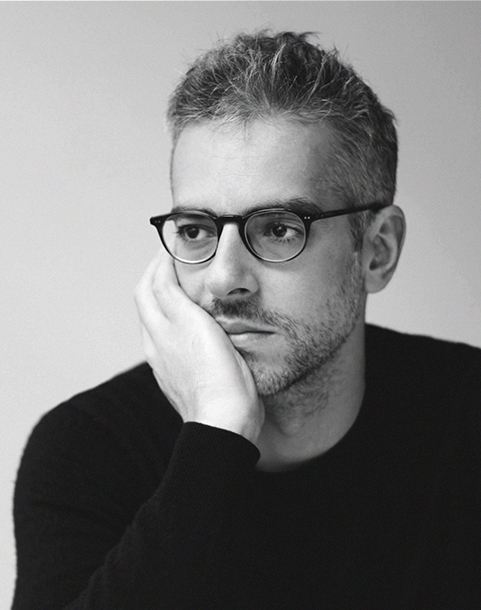
Rusadze in 2015

Zaza Rusadze (Georgian: ზაზა რუსაძე; born 24 May 1977 in Tbilisi, Georgia) is a film-maker, who lives in Tbilisi and Berlin, Germany. He is a member of the Georgian artists group Goslab.

== Career ==
From 1989 to 1994, in his teenager years, Rusadze worked as anchorperson on Georgian TV for a youth program.

In 1996 he became a student at College of Film and Television (Hochschule für Film und Fernsehen "Konrad Wolf" HFF), in Potsdam, Germany.

During his studies he worked in the news department of Deutsche Welle and – as an interpreter – on film festivals like Berlinale, Dok Leipzig or the East European Film Festival in Cottbus (Rusadze speaks Georgian, German, Russian and English).

In 2003 Rusadze graduated at HFF as a film director with the documentary film Bandits.

In 2007 Rusadze founded the production company Zazarfilm in Tbilisi.

Zaza Rusadze contributed to films of Nika Machaidze, Ineke Smits, Dito Tsintsadze, Otar Ioseliani or Julia Loktev.

== A Fold in My Blanket ==
From 2006 until 2007 Rusadze participated in the postgraduate program Binger Filmlab in Amsterdam, where he developed A Fold of my Blanket, a script for a forthcoming film.

In March 2010 he was granted the Nipkow scholarship in Berlin, to complete the screen-play for A Fold of my Blanket. In summer 2011 the shooting for his first fiction feature film begun. Rusadze changed the title to A Fold in My Blanket.

February 2013 the film opened the Panorama's main program of 63rd Berlinale. In Summer 2014 it was released on DVD.

== Filmography (selection) ==
as director:

- Oskar oder malen nach Zahlen (1997, documentary film, HFF, 16mm/15min)
- Zu weit und weiter (1999, short-film, HFF, 16mm/13min)
- Bandits (2003, documentary film based on the attempted hijacking of Aeroflot Flight 6833 in 1983)
- Ein Stern für Aneti (2005, fiction)
- Folds and Cracks (2009, short-film)
- Time Forward – A Documentary Series by Zaza Rusadze (2010, mini series for the Georgian TV channel PIK)
- A Fold in My Blanket (2013, fiction)
- with Andreas Reihse: Eurydike (2020, music video for Kreidler)

as scriptwriter:

- Bandits (2003)
- Ein Stern für Aneti (2005)
- Dito Tsintsadze: The Man from the Embassy (2006)
- Nika Machaidze: Anarekli (2009)
- Folds and Cracks (2009)
- A Fold in My Blanket (2013)

as producer (Zazarfilm):

- Folds and Cracks (2009)
- A Fold in My Blanket (2013)

== Awards ==
- 2003 Nominated for Media Prize Babelsberg, for Bandits* 2004 Best International Documentary for Bandits, International Festival of Young Filmmakers, Miskolc, Hungary
- Audience's Special Prize at Punto de Vista International Documentary Film Festival for Bandits
- 2007 The Man from the Embassy: Silver Astor Award for Best Script and ACCA – Asociación de Cronistas Cinematográficos de la Argentina's award Best Film of the Festival at Festival Internacional de Cine de Mar del Plata, Buenos Aires, Argentina
- 2009 Cottbuser Discovery Award for Falten und Risse
- 2020 22nd MuVi Award for the Best German Music Video with Andreas Reihse for Eurydike (Kreidler), International Short Film Festival Oberhausen
