= Ricardo Domeneck =

Brazilian poet (born 1977)

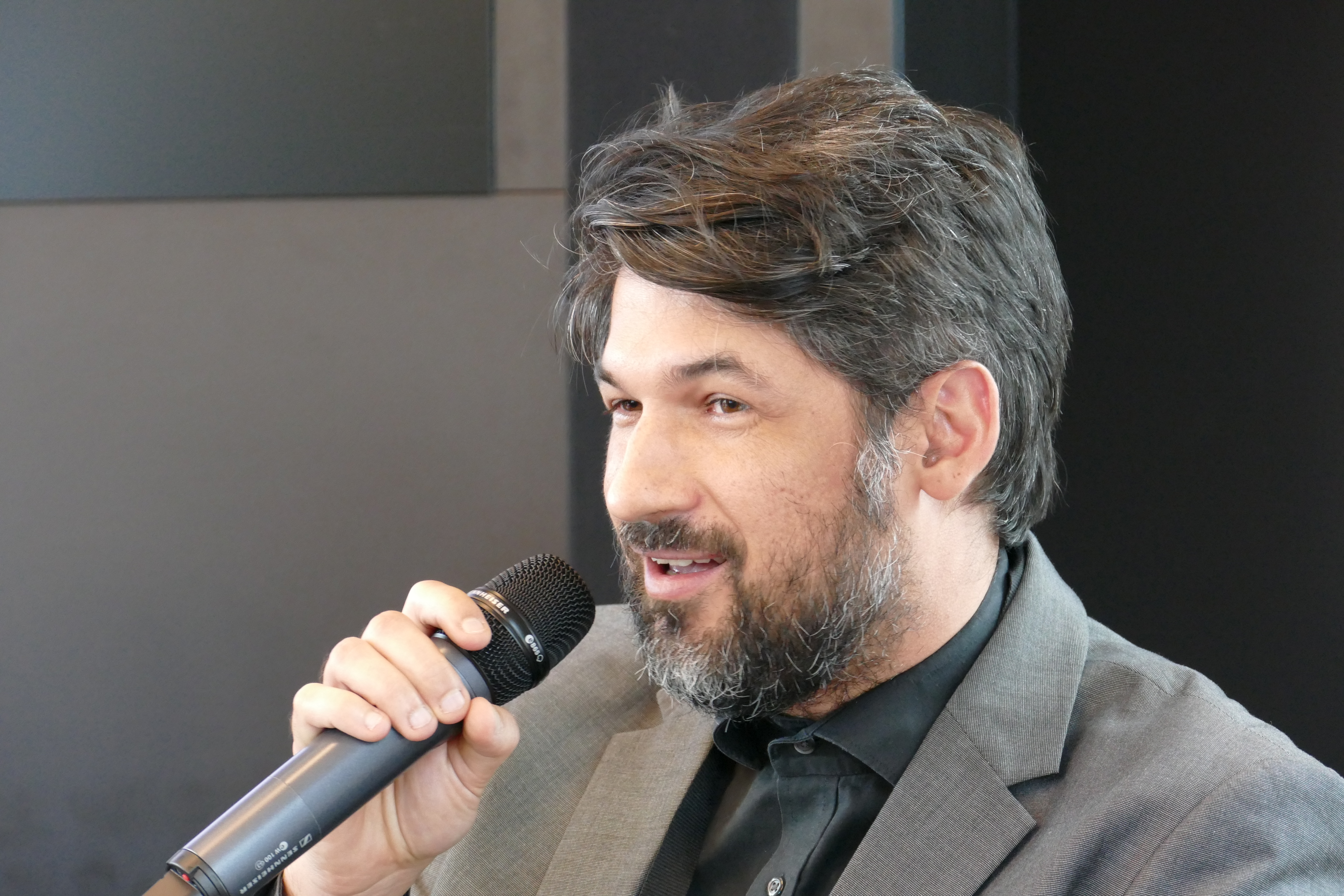
- Ricardo Domeneck at Fokus Lyrik 2019
- Born: July 4, 1977 (age 49); Bebedouro, São Paulo, Brazil
- Writing career
- Period: 2005–present

Ricardo Domeneck (born July 4, 1977) is a contemporary Brazilian poet, visual artist and critic. Currently, the poet lives and works in Berlin, Germany.

== Writing ==
Ricardo Domeneck has published four books of poetry and two chapbooks to date. His first collection of poems, entitled Carta aos anfíbios (Letter to amphibians), was published in Rio de Janeiro in 2005, released by a small publishing house.

His second book, a cadela sem Logos (the bitch without Logos), followed in 2007, this time with a major Brazilian publisher, Cosac Naify, which would also release in 2009 his third collection, Sons: Arranjo: Garganta (Sounds: Composition: Throat). His last book is titled Cigarros na cama (Cigarettes in bed), published in 2011.

In English, his poems have been included in anthologies of contemporary Brazilian poetry and he has also collaborated with poetry magazines such as Green Integer Review, edited by contemporary American poet Douglas Messerli. His texts have been translated into Spanish, Catalan, French, German, Slovenian and Arabic. Ricardo Domeneck is one of the editors of the online magazines Hilda and Modo de Usar & Co., and has conducted video interviews for other online magazines with artists and musicians such as Bat for Lashes, Ellen Allien, Heinz Peter Knes and Walter Pfeiffer, among others.

== Video and performance ==
In 2006, invited by the Brazilian television network known as TV Cultura, Ricardo Domeneck produced his first two videos. Since then, his work has ranged from writing to the vocal performance of texts merged with video. In Berlin, Ricardo Domeneck would begin a research of the poetics of performance and sound poetry of the Dada movement, also translating poets Hans Arp and Pierre Albert-Birot and poet-performers from the Wiener Gruppe (H. C. Artmann, Konrad Bayer, Gerhard Rühm, etc.) into Portuguese.

The same year he produced his first video, Domeneck started performing in experimental poetry festivals of cities such as Buenos Aires, Madrid, Barcelona and Brussels, including performances museums such as the Espai d´Art Contemporani in Castelló and the Museo Reina Sofía in Madrid. The poet is also the co-founder of a collective of artists based in Berlin, which organizes weekly performances and live acts at the club Neue Berliner Initiative, including artists, musicians and bands such as Kevin Blechdom, Wolfgang Müller of Die Tödliche Doris, JD Samson and Johanna Fateman of Le Tigre, Mystery Jets, Stereo Total, Mount Sims, Shunda K of Yo Majesty, Bruce LaBruce and Angie Reed, among others.

The collective is also responsible for the independent label Kute Bash Records, which has released the London-based multimedia duo Tetine. In video art, his interventions have been shown from nightclubs and galleries in Europe to the public television in Brazil. In both his writing and videos, Ricardo Domeneck concentrates on his own body as fixed set of materials.

== Bibliography ==
Poetry

- Carta aos anfibios (Rio de Janeiro: Editora Bem-Te-Vi, 2005) ISBN 85-88747-17-0
- a cadela sem Logos (São Paulo: Cosac Naify, 2007) ISBN 978-85-7503-568-9
- Sons: Arranjo: Garganta (São Paulo: Cosac Naify, 2009) ISBN 978-85-7503-778-2
- Cigarros na cama (Rio de Janeiro: Berinjela/Modo de Usar & Co., 2011)

Chapbooks

- When they spoke I / confused cortex / for context (London: Kute Bash Books, 2006)
- Corpos e palanques (São Paulo: Dulcineia Catadora, 2009)

Anthologies in Translation

- Cuatro Poetas Recientes del Brasil (Buenos Aires: Black & Vermelho, 2006) ISBN 987-22223-2-0
- Überland und Leuchtende Städte – 12 Dichterinnen und Dichter aus Lateinamerika (Berlin: SuKulTur, 2006) ISBN 3-937737-74-X
- Tigertail Poetry Annual: Brazil Issue (Miami: Tigertail, 2008).
- Dnevi poezije in vina (Ljubljana: Študentska založba, 2009)
