= Andro Wekua =

Georgian artist (born 1977)

Andro Wekua (Georgian: ანდრო ვეკუა) (born 1977) is a Georgian artist based in Zurich, Switzerland, and Berlin, Germany.

Wekua was born in Sokhumi and witnessed an ethnic conflict in Abkhazia in the 1990s. His father, the Georgian political activist Vova Wekua, was killed by the Abkhaz nationalists during the 1989 Sukhumi riots. His work encompasses painting, collage, drawing, installation, sculpture, and film.

== Selected exhibitions ==
2011

- Pink Wave Hunter, Kunsthalle Fridericianum, Kassel, cur. Rein Wolfs (solo show)
- A Neon Shadow, Castello Di Rivoli, Turin (solo show)
- Never sleep with a strawberry in your mouth, Kunsthalle Wien, Vienna (solo show)
- Preis der Nationalgalerie für junge Kunst 2011, Hamburger Bahnhof, Berlin
- ILLUMInations, 54th Venice Biennale 2011, Venice

2010

- 10,000 Lives, the 8th Gwangju Biennale, Gwangju, cur. Massimiliano Gioni
- Skin Fruit: Selections from the Dakis Joannou Collection, New Museum, New York, cur. Jeff Koons
- Abstract Resistance, Walker Art Center, Minneapolis, cur. Yasmil Raymond
- Contemplating the Void: Interventions in the Guggenheim Museum, Solomon R. Guggenheim Museum, New York, cur. Nancy Spector
- 1995, Gladstone Gallery, Brussels (solo show)

2009

- Workshop Report, Wiels, Brussels, cur. Dirk Snauwaert (solo show)
- 28. August, Galerie Peter Kilchmann, Zurich (solo show)
- Workshop Report, Museion, Bolzano (solo show)
- A GUEST + A HOST = A GHOST, Deste Foundation, Athens

2008

- My Bike and Your Swamp, Camden Art Center, London (solo show)
- My Bike and Your Swamp, Hallen Haarlem, Haarlem, cur. Xander Karskens (solo show)
- Sunset, Le Magasin CNAC, Grenoble, cur. Yves Aupetitallot (solo show)
- Expenditure, Busan Biennale, Korea, cur. Tom Morton
- Life on Mars, The 2008 Carnegie International, cur. Douglas Fogle
- Blue Mirror, Gladstone Gallery, New York (solo show)
- Fractured Figure, Deste Foundation, Athens

2007

- Interlude, Galerie Peter Kilchmann, Zurich (solo show)
- The Hydra Workshops, Hydra, cur. Sadie Coles (solo show)
- Wait to Wait, Museum Boijmans van Beuningen, Rotterdam, cur. Rein Wolfs (solo show)
- Everyday is Saturday, Tbilisi Center for Contemporary Art, Tbilisi, cur. Daniel Baumann

2006

- I’m sorry if I’m not very funny tonights, Kunstmuseum Winterthur, cur. Dieter Schwarz (solo show)
- Printemps de Septembre, Toulouse, cur. Mirjam Varadinis
- Without Mirror, Gladstone Gallery, New York (solo show)
- Of Mouse and Men, 4th Berlin Biennale, Berlin, cur. Maurizio Cattelan, Massimiliano Gioni, Ali Subotnick

2005

- Expanded Painting, Prague Biennale 2, cur. Helena Kontova & Giancarlo Politi
- Lively Memories, Plattform, Berlin, cur. Aurélie Voltz
- Del Rio, Shirana Shahbazi & Andro Wekua, Zimmerfrei, Lugano, cur. Giovanni Carmine

2004

- That would have been wonderful, Neue Kunst Halle St. Gallen, St. Gallen, cur. Gianni Jetzer (solo show)
- Punktleuchten, Hotel 3 Könige, Basel, cur. Klaus Littmann
- Fürchte Dich, Helmhaus Zürich, Zurich, cur. Gianni Jetzer & Simon Maurer
- Emotion Eins, Frankfurter Kunstverein, Frankfurt, cur. Nicolaus Schafhausen

== Monographs and artist's books ==
- Andro Wekua / Rita Ackermann : Chapter 2, Nieves, Zurich, 2003
- Andro Wekua / Rita Ackermann : Chapter 3, Nieves, Zurich, 2005
- Andro Wekua: ...no one was there, she did not know it..., Nieves, Zurich, 2005
- Andro Wekua: Shadows on the Facade, Nieves, Zurich, 2007
- Andro Wekua: The Hydra Workshops, Sadie Coles, London, 2007
- Andro Wekua: That Would Have Been Wonderful, Patrick Frey Verlag, 2005
- Andro Wekua: If there ever was one, Kunstmuseum Winterthur, JRP-Ringier, 2006
- Andro Wekua: Workshop Report, Walther König Verlag, Köln, 2009,
- Andro Wekua / Boris Groys: Wait to Wait, Christoph Keller Editions, JRP Ringier, Zurich, 2009
- Andro Wekua / Ketuta Alexi: Anywhere Anyhow, PamBook, Melbourne, Australia, 2009
