= Heinz Emigholz =

Heinz Emigholz (born 22 January 1948 in Achim, near Bremen, Germany) is a filmmaker, actor, artist, writer and producer. He lives and works in Berlin and Malta. Emigholz has produced a comprehensive filmic and artistic oeuvre and has also done performance art and acted in other directors’ films (Cynthia Beatt, Silke Grossmann, Stefan Hayn, Birgit and Wilhelm Hein, Ken Jacobs, Sheila McLaughlin, Sandra Nettelbeck, Elfi Mikesch, Lior Shamriz, Joseph Vilsmaier, Klaus Wyborny a.o.).

== Career ==
Emigholz has been trained as an illustrator and a retoucher. He has studied philosophy and literary studies at the university in Hamburg. In 1968 he started to work with the medium film. Since 1973 Emigholz is working independently as a self-employed artist in the USA and in Germany. In 1978 he founded the film company Pym Films.

Between 1993-2013 he was Professor for Experimental film at Berlin University of the Arts, where he founded the Institute for Time Based Media. In 2006 he started publishing the series DVD-Edition des Filminstituts with selected film works by graduates of his Art and Media degree program (continued by Professor Thomas Arslan). Among his students were Tomma Abts, Till Beckmann Niklas Goldbach, Lilli Kuschel, Jörg Langkau, Rita Macedo, Salome Machaidze, Marta Popivoda, Markus Ruff, Lior Shamriz, Tal Sterngast, Clarissa Thieme. Since 2010 he is Professor for film at European Graduate School in Saas-Fee, Switzerland. Since 2012 Emigholz is a member of Akademie der Künste Berlin in the section Visual Arts.

== Films ==
Emigholz’s first films, dating back to the early 1970s and the context of avant-garde and Experimental film, display "a complex interaction between abstract temporal compositions – or filmic movements, respectively – and selected urban and natural landscapes" (Emigholz).

In Demon (1976/77), he began to examine words. The film explores the prose poem "Le Démon de l’Analogie" (The Demon of Analogy) by Stéphane Mallarmé. "Just as previous films were cut so that fixed features of the landscape and their connections met with a score, in this film, there is one shot for each word." (Frieda Grafe) Emigholz included narrative and scenic elements in Normalsatz / Ordinary Sentence (1978–81) and his subsequent films.

His visual composition and framing, which establishes a phenomenological relationship to space, is described as striking, as it ignores the conventional perpendicularity and the central perspective: "The visual space is always populated in the films rather than being empty space whose coordinates are fixed to categories borrowed from abstract geometry, such as the horizon and the vanishing point. Where there is a space, there is also a body that defines it, even if it be via its negative form, absence." (Ronald Balczuweit) This type of construction of space remains defining for his series Photography and beyond, a "collection of films that can be combined freely and that deal with products designed by humans – architecture, drawings, writings, sculpture" (Emigholz). The series was established in 1993 and drew on previous work from the 1970s and 1980s. The films of the subseries Architecture as Autobiography show the extant buildings by architects, civil engineers and designers such as Bruce Goff, Adolf Loos, Robert Maillart, Rudolph Schindler, Louis Sullivan and others in chronological order.

About film Emigholz states: "As a technical medium, film projects the spaces of memory themselves rather than presenting them solely by means of a mental trick. The media of writing, drawing, photography, film, electronic imagery and computing have shifted the complex art of recollection into a readily-available array of technically -generated storage systems. The ancient art of the rhetorician is still present, albeit in rudimentary form, in the memorizing of text by actors and speakers.

== Art ==
In New York in 1974, Emigholz began to work on Die Basis des Make-Up/The Basis of Make-Up, a series which grew to more than 600 drawings by 2008. The title goes back to the caption of a photo showing a skull in a makeup textbook from the 1930s. All the drawings were in black and white and were published as photographic prints in the format 54 x 64 cm. Like many of his films, they were developed from the artist’s notebooks which he uses to record sketches of his own texts and to paste various specimens of civilization garbage, sentences overheard on the street or on television, advertising, diagrams from military textbooks and much more. These bits and pieces were transformed in the drawings and films and were connected to one another in austere compositions, but their origins remained discernible. Narrative approaches emerge, yet they do not connect to a single narrative, but can still be combined freely. The "experience of the provisionality and relativity of all interpretations" (Hanne Loreck) is mirrored in this formal openness.

== Filmography ==
=== Photography and beyond ===
==== Architecture as Autobiography ====
- Mamani in El Alto (2022), DCP, 5.1, 95 min, director, script, camera, editing. Photography and beyond – Part 35. About Freddy Mamani.
- Salamone, Pampa (2022), DCP, 62 min, director, script, camera, editing. Photography and beyond – Part 34. About Francisco Salamone.

==== Other films in the series ====
- Berlin [Underground] (2021), HD, director, script, camera, editing. Photography and beyond – Part 33.
- Antivilla (2016–2021), HDV, 6 min, director, script, camera, editing. Photography and beyond – Part 32. About Arno Brandlhuber.
- WEISS hoch ZWEI (2021), HDV, 22 min, director, script, camera, editing. Photography and beyond – Part 31.
- Casa Golly (2015–2021), HDV, 7 min, director, script, camera, editing. Photography and beyond – Part 30. About Arno Brandlhuber.
- Years of Construction (Baujahre, 2013–2018), DCP, 93 min, director, script, camera, editing. Photography and beyond – Part 29. About the Kunsthalle Mannheim.
- Two Basilicas (2018), DCP, color, 36 min, conception (together with Thomas Bo Jensen), director, camera, editing. Photography and beyond – Part 28. About Orvieto Cathedral and Grundtvig's Church in Copenhagen.
- Dieste [Uruguay] (2015–2017), DCP, color, 95 min, director, script, camera, editing. Photography and beyond – Part 27. About Eladio Dieste.
- Streetscapes [Dialogue] (2015–2017), DCP, color, 132 min, director, script, camera, editing. Photography and beyond – Part 26.
- Bickels [Socialism] (2015–2017), HDV, color, 92 min, director, camera, editing. Photography and beyond – Part 25. About Samuel Bickels.
- 2 + 2 = 22 [The Alphabet] (2013–2017), DCP, color, 88 min, director, script, camera, editing. Photography and beyond – Part 24.
- Two Museums (2012/2014), DCP, color, 18 min, director, camera, editing. Photography and beyond – Part 22. About Renzo Piano's building for the Menil Collection in Houston and Samuel Bickels' Museum of Art in Ein Harod.
- The Airstrip (2016), DCP, color, 108 min, director, camera, editing. Photography and beyond – Part 21.
- Parabeton – Pier Luigi Nervi and Roman Concrete (2012), DCP, color, 100 min, director, camera, editing. Photography and beyond – Part 19.
- Le Corbusier [IIIII] Asger Jorn [Relief] (2015), HDV, color, 29 min, director, script, camera, editing. About Le Corbusier's Villa Savoye and Asger Jorn's Grand Relief in the Aarhus Statsgymnasium.
- Zwei Projekte von Frederick Kiesler (Two Projects by Frederick Kiesler, 2006–2009), HDV, color, 16 min, director, camera, editing.
- Sense of Architecture (2005–2009), HDV, color, 168 min, director, camera, editing. Explores more than 50 projects by contemporary Austrian architects.
- Loos Ornamental (2008), 35 mm, color, 72 min, director, camera, editing. About Adolf Loos.
- Schindler's Houses (2006–2007), 35 mm, color, 99 min, co-producer, editing, director, script, camera. About the American work of Rudolph Schindler.
- D’Annunzios Cave (2002–2005), DigiBeta, color, 52 min, director, editing. About Gabriele d'Annunzio and his villa.
- Goff in the Desert (2002–2003), 35 mm, color, 110 min, director, camera, editing. Explores 62 buildings by architect Bruce Goff.
- Maillart's Bridges (1995–1999), 35 mm, color, 24 min, director, camera, editing. About the works of bridge builder Robert Maillart.
- Sullivan's Banks (1993–1999), 35 mm, color, 38 min, director, camera, editing. About Louis Sullivan's bank buildings.

==== Miscellanea ====
- A Series of Thoughts (Miscellanea V, VI, VII und IV) (1987–2011), HDV, color, 91 min, director, camera, editing.
- Miscellanea III (1997–2005), 35 mm, color, 22 min, director, editing, camera.

=== Decampment of Modernism ===
- Parabeton – Pier Luigi Nervi and Roman Concrete (2012), DCP, color, 100 min, director, camera, editing. Part I. Also Photography and beyond – Part 19.
- The Airstrip (2016), DCP, color, 108 min, director, camera, editing. Part III. Also Photography and beyond – Part 21.

=== The Basis of Make-Up ===
- The Basis of Make-Up I (1974–1983), 35 mm, color, silent, 30 min, director, script, drawings, notebooks, camera, editing.
- The Basis of Make-Up (1979–1984), 16 mm, black and white and color, 84 min, director, script, camera, editing.
- The Basis of Make-Up III (1996–2005), 35 mm, color, 26 min, director, camera, editing, drawings.
- Berlin [Underground] (2021), HD, director, script, camera, editing. Also Photography and beyond – Part 33.

=== Other films ===
- Slaughterhouses of Modernity (2022), DCP, 80 min, director, script, camera, editing.
- The Lobby (2020), 76 min, director, script, camera, editing.
- The Last City (2020), 100 min, director, script, camera, editing.
- Five music videos for the band KREIDLER (2012–2013), total 55 min, director, camera, editing.
- The Holy Bunch (1986–1990), 35 mm, black and white and color, 89 min, director, script, camera.
- Die Wiese der Sachen (1974–1987), 16 mm, black and white and color, 88 min, director, script, camera, editing, lighting, actor.
- Normalsatz (1978–1981), 16 mm, black and white and color, 105 min, director, camera, editing, script, actor.

=== Early experimental films ===
- Morningglory-Fragments (1971), director, camera, editing, producer, script.
- Schenec-Tady I (1972–1973), 16 mm, black and white, silent, 27 min, director, conceptual design, composition, camera, editing, production.
- Schenec-Tady II (1973), 16 mm, color, silent, 18 min, director, conceptual design, composition, camera, editing, production.
- Schenec-Tady III (1972–1975), 16 mm, black and white, silent, 20 min, director, conceptual design, composition, camera, editing, production.
- Arrowplane (1973–1974), 16 mm, color, silent, 24 min, director, conceptual design, camera, editing, production.
- Tide (1974), 16 mm, black and white, silent, 33 min, director, conceptual design, camera, editing, production.
- Stuhl (1974–1975), director, producer, camera, editing, script.
- Hotel (1975–1976), 16 mm, black and white, 27 min, director, conceptual design, camera, editing, production.
- Demon. The Translation of "The Demon of Analogy" by Stéphane Mallarmé (1976–1977), 16 mm, black and white and color, 30 min, director, conceptual design, camera, editing, production.

=== Acting and other contributions ===
- Mammamia (1997/98), directed by Sandra Nettelbeck, actor.
- Brother of Sleep (1994/95), directed by Joseph Vilsmaier, actor.
- Stalingrad (1991/92), directed by Joseph Vilsmaier, actor.
- Home Movies 1971–1981 (1985), actor.
- Execution. A Study of Mary (1979), narrator.
- Der Ort der Handlung (1976/1977), actor.
- Bartleby (1976), actor.
