= Love Happens (2009 film) =

2009 film by Brandon Camp

- Theatrical release poster
- Directed by: Brandon Camp
- Written by: Brandon Camp; Mike Thompson
- Produced by: Scott Stuber; Mike Thompson
- Starring: Aaron Eckhart; Jennifer Aniston; Dan Fogler; Judy Greer; Joe Anderson; John Carroll Lynch; Martin Sheen
- Cinematography: Eric Alan Edwards
- Edited by: Dana E. Glauberman
- Music by: Christopher Young
- Production companies: Relativity Media; Stuber Pictures
- Distributed by: Universal Pictures (United States, Canada and France); Focus Features International (International)
- Release date: September 18, 2009
- Running time: 109 minutes
- Country: United States
- Language: English
- Budget: $18 million
- Box office: $36.1 million

Love Happens is a 2009 American romantic drama film written by Mike Thompson and Brandon Camp, directed by Camp, and starring Aaron Eckhart and Jennifer Aniston.

The story follows therapist and self-help author Burke Ryan, secretly grieving widower, who finally finds love again with the slightly jaded florist Eloise.

The film was released on September 18, 2009, by Universal Pictures in the United States, Canada and France, with Focus Features International releasing in other territories. Love Happens garnered negative reviews from critics while grossing $36.1 million against an $18 million budget.

== Plot ==
Burke Ryan is a successful therapist, holder of a Ph.D. and author of a self-help book that gives advice about dealing with the loss of a loved one. He writes the book to deal with his grief after his wife dies in a car accident.

While giving a workshop in Seattle, where his wife was from, Burke meets Eloise, who owns a flower shop. She spurns his initial advances because her past relationships had not gone well. However, after a heated exchange in the men's restroom, Eloise agrees to meet him for what is an awkward dinner.

Burke explains it is his first date in three years. Eloise assumes he is divorced, and they begin spending time together. She insists to her mother and her employee Marty that they are not "dating."

During the workshop, Burke pays special attention to a man named Walter, a former contractor working as a night janitor after his son died after falling off a scaffold, resulting in the loss of his marriage and construction business. He is attending the seminar at the insistence of his sister, but is unwilling to participate as he is not convinced Burke's methods will help him. Burke gets through to him by helping him remember his passion for construction and buys him new tools to restart his business.

Eloise suspects Burke is hiding secrets regarding the loss of his wife. She eventually learns the truth from Burke's manager Lane and tells him to stop punishing himself. Burke confesses to an audience that, in reality, he was the one driving the car when his wife died, and not her, as he previously maintained, and he blames himself for her death and has yet to confront his pain.

Burke's father-in-law, who snuck into the seminar to publicly call him out, comes forward to assure him that his wife's death was not his fault and that his in-laws were only upset that he would not mourn her death with them. Their reconciliation onstage receives applause from the audience. Afterward, Burke's father-in-law suggests it is time to move on with his life.

Burke decides to stay in Seattle. Going to Eloise's flower shop, he says they had spent the last few days getting to know the part of him that was not available, so he wonders if she would like to get to know the part of him that is. Eloise answers with a kiss.

== Cast ==
- Aaron Eckhart as Burke Ryan, PhD, a widowed self-help author and therapist who holds grieving seminars around the country
- Jennifer Aniston as Eloise Chandler, a florist and the woman that Burke begins dating
- Frances Conroy as Eloise's mother
- Martin Sheen as Burke's father-in-law
- Judy Greer as Marty, Eloise's employee and friend
- Dan Fogler as Lane "Goddamn" Marshall, Burke's manager
- Joe Anderson as Tyler, Eloise's musician boyfriend, whom she breaks up with over his cheating
- John Carroll Lynch as Walter, a reluctant seminar attendee who lost his son
- Darla Vandenbossche as Beehive
- Michelle Harrison as Cynthia
- Panou as Unicom Executive #3, a Unicom Exec
- Michael Kopsa as Unicom CEO

== Soundtrack ==
Love Happens OST

Soundtrack album by Christopher Young
- Released: September 11, 2009
- Genre: Score • Various
- Length: 47:23
- Label: La-La Land Records • Relativity Music Group

Christopher Young chronology
Drag Me to Hell (2009)	Love Happens OST (2009)	When in Rome (2010)

Additional music by:

No.	Title	Music	Length
1.	"The Time of Times"	Badly Drawn Boy	3:17
2.	"Dream"	Priscilla Ahn	3:31
3.	"Lake Michigan"	Rogue Wave	5:01
4.	"Fresh Feeling"	Eels	3:38
5.	"We Will Become Silhouettes"	The Postal Service	4:59
6.	"Your Hand In Mine"	Explosions in the Sky	4:08
7.	"Have A Little Faith in Me"	John Hiatt	4:01
8.	"IO (This Time Around)"	Helen Stellar	5:05
9.	"Everyday"	Rogue Wave	3:38
10.	"Little Wing"	Christopher Young	6:02
11.	"Love Happens"	Christopher Young	3:22
Total length:			47:23

All tracks are written by Christopher Young.

No.	Title	Length
1.	"Love Happens"	3:18
2.	"Kaledoscope Christmas"	2:18
3.	"A World In The Three Colors"	2:18
4.	"It's MMM...Good"	1:48
5.	"Crystal Flowers"	2:12
6.	"Walk The Talk"	1:30
7.	"Around Or Through?"	3:55
8.	"Past Isn't"	3:34
9.	"Joy Within Each Thought"	1:56
10.	"Groove E"	1:31
11.	"Each Decorated Ditch"	2:43
12.	"Vodka Logic"	3:41
13.	"Mind Noise"	4:20
14.	"Cinnamon Life"	2:44
15.	"We're A-OK"	2:44
16.	"Love Happened"	6:02
17.	"Baggage Blister Hoedown" (BONUS TRACK)	1:53
18.	"A Constant Cry" (BONUS TRACK)	3:04
19.	"A Dissonant Discourse" (BONUS TRACK)	2:57
20.	"Why The Hell Am I In Heaven?" (BONUS TRACK)	2:38
21.	"Not Really Postlude" (BONUS TRACK)	3:18
22.	"Freud Who?" (BONUS TRACK)	1:52
23.	"Fast Toward The Eye (Of Lorelei)" (BONUS TRACK)	3:49

== Production ==
During development, the film was known as Brand New Day and Traveling. It takes place in Seattle, Washington, and was filmed in Seattle and Vancouver, British Columbia.

On September 15, 2009, a lawsuit was filed by two writers claiming the film's premise was stolen from them, seeking an injunction against its release or to be awarded the film's future profits, estimated at $100,000,000.

== Release ==
On its opening weekend, the film opened at #4 behind I Can Do Bad All By Myself, The Informant!, and Cloudy with a Chance of Meatballs respectively with $8,057,010.

== Reception ==
Rotten Tomatoes reported that 16% of critics gave positive reviews based on 110 reviews with a score of 3.8/10. The site's consensus states: "Love Happens is a dull, chemistry-free affair that under-utilizes its appealing leads". Another review aggregator, Metacritic, which assigns a normalized rating from reviews of mainstream critics, gave the film a "generally unfavorable" score of 33% based on 25 reviews.

== Home media ==
Love Happens was released on DVD and Blu-ray on February 2, 2010. It grossed $7,721,633 in US DVD sales.
