= We Will Become Silhouettes =

2005 single by the Postal Service

Single by the Postal Service

from the album Give Up
- B-side: "Be Still My Heart"
- Released: February 8, 2005
- Recorded: 2001–2003
- Genre: Indietronica; alternative rock
- Length: 5:00
- Label: Sub Pop
- Songwriters: Ben Gibbard; Jimmy Tamborello
- Producer: The Postal Service

The Postal Service singles chronology
| "Against All Odds" (2004) | "We Will Become Silhouettes" (2005) | "A Tattered Line of String" (2013) |

"We Will Become Silhouettes" is a single by American indie band the Postal Service, released February 8, 2005, under the Sub Pop Records label. The single included a new track "Be Still My Heart" and two remixed tracks by Matthew Dear ("We Will Become Silhouettes") and Styrofoam ("Nothing Better"). The title track has been used in a Honda Civic commercial. Indie band The Shins recorded an acoustic cover of the title track, which was included as a B-side on the Postal Service's earlier single "Such Great Heights".

"We Will Become Silhouettes" was the fourth single released by The Postal Service and is the band's most successful, reaching number three on the Canadian Singles Chart, number 82 on the US Billboard Hot 100 and number 92 on the UK Singles Chart.

The cover artwork was designed by Kozyndan, who have illustrated the previous singles as well.

== Music video ==
The video for this song, directed by Jared Hess, consists of incongruously lighthearted footage of a family (consisting of band members Ben Gibbard, Jimmy Tamborello, frequent collaborator Jenny Lewis, and two young children) playing and singing the song, then riding bicycles into the desert and, at the very end, watching the sun set in the distance. Their odd clothing, the worn down houses they pass by, abandoned streets, and the lyrics may suggest the video takes place far in the future, post-nuclear attack.

== Track listing ==
All tracks are written by The Postal Service.

"We Will Become Silhouettes"
| No. | Title | Length |
|---|---|---|
| 1. | "We Will Become Silhouettes" | 5:00 |
| 2. | "Be Still My Heart" | 3:02 |
| 3. | "Nothing Better (Styrofoam remix)" | 3:30 |
| 4. | "We Will Become Silhouettes (Matthew Dear's not scared mix)" | 5:02 |

== Charts ==
"We Will Become Silhouettes" reached number 82 on the US Billboard Hot 100, one of few record charts in the world to combine sales and airplay in its methodology, unlike others that are sales-only. Removing radio spins, the song debuted at number two on February 26, 2005 at remained at that position for another four weeks, blocked from the top spot by Destiny Child's "Soldier".

Weekly chart performance for "We Will Become Silhouettes"
| Chart (2005) | Peak position |
|---|---|
| Canada (Nielsen SoundScan) | 3 |
| UK Singles (Official Charts) | 92 |
| UK Indie (Official Charts) | 26 |
| US Billboard Hot 100 | 82 |
| US Dance Singles Sales | 1 |

Annual chart rankings for "We Will Become Silhouettes"
| Chart (2005) | Rank |
|---|---|
| US Hot Singles Sales (Billboard) | 11 |

== Covers ==
The song was covered by Jenny and Tyler in 2013 as a part of their For Freedom EP.

The song was covered by The Shins and included on the Postal Service's 2003 CD single for "Such Great Heights."

== In popular culture ==
The song was used in the trailer for the 2009 film Funny People, and also appeared in the movie Love Happens the same year.

The Shins' cover of the song was featured in the 2011 film The Art of Getting By.
