= Such Great Heights =

2003 single by The Postal Service

Single by The Postal Service

from the album Give Up
- B-side: "There's Never Enough Time"
- Released: January 2003
- Recorded: 2002
- Genre: Indietronica; indie pop; synth-pop; electronic rock
- Length: 4:26
- Label: Sub Pop
- Songwriters: Ben Gibbard; Jimmy Tamborello
- Producer: The Postal Service

The Postal Service singles chronology
"Such Great Heights" (2003)	"The District Sleeps Alone Tonight" (2003)

The Postal Service - "Such Great Heights"
An 18 second sample of the song's chorus.

"Such Great Heights" is a song by American indie pop band The Postal Service. It was released as the lead single from their debut studio album, Give Up, in 2003 through Sub Pop Records. The single includes a previously unreleased track, "There's Never Enough Time", and two cover tracks by The Shins and Iron & Wine of "We Will Become Silhouettes" and "Such Great Heights", respectively. It reached its peak at 21 on the Billboard Hot 100 Singles Sales chart.

"Such Great Heights" ranked 27 on Rolling Stone's 100 Best Songs of the Decade list.

== Background ==
"Such Great Heights" came together late in the recording process, and was one of the last songs the duo the Postal Service completed in June 2002. Its genesis came together "incredibly quickly," according to Ben Gibbard, who felt it "seemingly came out of nowhere. It did feel that there was some sort of spiritual transcendence happening and the song being beamed down to me." For Gibbard, the song was a thematic departure from his more melancholy subject matter: "I think 'Such Great Heights' is the first time I've ever written a positive love song," he told Rolling Stone, "where it's a song about being in love and how it's rad, rather than having your heart broken."

The song was written by Ben Gibbard and Jimmy Tamborello, and recorded in early 2002. The final recordings include backing vocals in the studio recording by Jen Wood, whose other collaborations include work for The Black Heart Procession and Joan of Arc. The single for "Such Great Heights" was the first CD released by The Postal Service, featuring cover artwork designed by Kozyndan. The release of the single served as a preview for the band's album, Give Up, which was released a month later.

== Music video ==
Professional ratings
Review scores
Source	Rating
Allmusic	3/5 stars
*Pitchfork Media	(6.3/10)

The music video for "Such Great Heights" was directed by Josh & Xander, and premiered in April 2003.

Set in the clean room of a semiconductor fabrication plant, where, as the machinery assembles devices, two workers in bunny suits cast longing glances at each other. For most of the song, the two workers are primarily shown, interspersed with shots of the machinery working on silicon wafers. When the bridge comes, the video leaves the two workers as one is carefully taking a wafer from the other, and dives into a sequence of shots of machines assembling wafers; then zooms in on a bank of chips; then zooms out to show the chips are inside of a satellite; then zooms in on the Earth and down to the city block containing EnergySolutions Arena (now the Delta Center), in Salt Lake City, however the block has been replaced with a computer circuit; from there, a match cut is made to a monitor in the factory displaying a similar looking computer chip; and this is the end of the sequence, cutting back to the two workers handing over the wafer.

The video was filmed inside a real fabrication plant run by Skyworks Solutions When the video premiered on iTunes, the Skyworks Solutions name and logo were blurred out during some scenes.

Josh & Xander later created a commercial for Apple Computer Inc. (now Apple Inc.) and Intel using similar footage. While strikingly similar to the music video, the commercial did not contain imagery of The Postal Service or a recording of its music. On January 19, 2006, Ben Gibbard stated on the band's website, "It has recently come to our attention that Apple Computers' new television commercial for the Intel chip features a shot-for-shot recreation of our video for 'Such Great Heights' made by the same filmmakers responsible for the original." In response, the band issued the following statement: "We did not approve this commercialization and are extremely disappointed with both parties that this was executed without our consultation or consent."

== Track listing ==
1. "Such Great Heights" – 4:27
2. "There's Never Enough Time" – 3:33
3. "We Will Become Silhouettes" (cover by The Shins) – 3:01
4. "Such Great Heights" (cover by Iron & Wine) – 4:10

== Uses in media ==
- The original version was featured in the trailer for the 2004 film Garden State; the Iron & Wine cover was featured in both the film and its soundtrack.
- The instrumental version of the song was featured as part of UPS's "Whiteboard" ad campaign, which was launched 6 January 2007, almost four years after the song was officially released.
- Was the original theme song to Grey's Anatomy, and appears on its 2005 season one soundtrack, Grey's Anatomy Original Soundtrack Volume 1
- In 2013 in Australia, the song was used in Telstra's 'Thanks' TV ad campaign
- In Chile, the song was featured Bank commercial of BCI in 2017.
- Featured in "And Sorry If I Dissed You", episode 6 of season 1 of the TV series, Tell Me Lies in 2022.
- A version featured in the trailer for season 2 of Star Trek: Strange New Worlds.
- Parts of the song are incorporated into "Elephant Love Medley" from the Broadway production of Moulin Rouge! The Musical.
- Used in "Now Comes the Mystery", episode 7 of the 2019 miniseries Looking for Alaska
- Featured in the teaser trailer for Disney/Pixar’s 2025 film Elio.
- Used in an April 2025 advertisement for CoreWeave.
- In April 2026, the song was featured in an advertisement for Xfinity Mobile.
- In August 2026, the song was featured in an advertisement for Domino’s.

== Cover versions ==
- Ben Folds covered "Such Great Heights" on Australian radio station Triple J in 2006, using a piano, forks, tin foil, and glass. He also played the song live during shows from 2006 through 2010.
- Confide covered the song in 2009.
- Amanda Palmer of The Dresden Dolls has performed "Such Great Heights" solo on keyboard at live concerts, as well as releasing a ukulele version with Kim Boekbinder in 2011.
- Joy Kills Sorrow released a cover on their 2013 EP Wide Awake.
- Streetlight Manifesto released a cover on their 2010 album 99 Songs of Revolution Vol. 1.
- Gareth Pearson released a cover on Urban Echoes Vol. 2 in 2012.
- As It Is released a cover on the 2019 compilation album Songs That Saved My Life.
- Jeremy Zucker released a cover on his 2025 album Garden State.
- The Petersens and Dawson Hollow covered "Such Great Heights" in 2026.
- Chvrches released a cover for the third season of the Hulu series Tell Me Lies in 2026.

== Commercial performance ==
"Such Great Heights" was the band's first single; both Gibbard and Tamborello both jokingly referred to it as "the hit" of the album, presaging its eventual popularity. The duo had hoped to offer more to listeners than a typical A/B-side release, and Sub Pop labelmates the Shins and Iron & Wine agreed to cover two of the group's songs. Iron & Wine's rendition of "Such Great Heights" aided in boosting the song's profile. Both versions were simultaneously popular, with Iron & Wine's version used in the film and soundtrack for Garden State, as well as in television advertisement for M&M's. The original version was licensed for commercials for Target, Ask.com, UPS, and Kaiser Permanente.

It debuted on Billboard's Hot 100 Singles Sales chart, a ranking which only tallied physical sales, at number 30 on February 8, 2003. It rose to its peak position of number 21 the following week, and slowly fell after that. In total, the song spent eleven weeks on the chart.

The success of "Such Great Heights" was a grassroots approach. For example, in Boston, local independent retailer Newbury Comics campaigned for the city's alternative station, WFNX, to put the song on the air. Two of the first stations to broadcast the tune were KCRW in Los Angeles and KITS in San Francisco. In January 2004, influential Los Angeles alternative station KROQ-FM began playing "Such Great Heights", which bolstered the album's popularity. Sub Pop offered a free download of the song on their official website, which had been downloaded over nine million times by August 2005. Sub Pop A&R director Tony Kiewel was told by executives that the song had high "burn factor"—radio terminology for a song that listeners might quickly grow tired of.

Despite this, "Such Great Heights" continued to sell. The single had sold over 25,000 copies by August 2004, and was later certified gold by the Recording Industry Association of America for selling over 500,000 copies, in June 2005. The grassroots approach was also apparent in radio airplay; while it originally peaked at #44 on the Radio & Records Alternative chart in 2004, its airplay was so persistent that it managed to break into the chart again in 2005, peaking that time at #50.

== Charts ==
Chart (2003)	Peak position
US Hot 100 Singles Sales (Billboard)	21

Chart (2004)	Peak position
US Radio and Records Alternative	44

Chart (2005)	Peak position
US Radio and Records Alternative	50

== Certifications ==
Region	Certification	Certified units/sales
United States (RIAA)	Platinum	1,000,000^{‡}
^{‡} Sales+streaming figures based on certification alone.

== Covers ==
Sam Beam covered the song in 2003 under his stage name, Iron & Wine. This version was featured in the 2004 film Garden State, as well as its accompanying soundtrack. It was also used in a television advertisement for M&M's.

Ben Folds covered the song live on October 24, 2006 for the social media website MySpace.com. It would be the website's first live performance. It was released the following year on Folds' solo album and DVD Ben Folds Live at MySpace.

=== Certifications ===
Region	Certification	Certified units/sales
United States (RIAA)	Gold	500,000^{‡}
^{‡} Sales+streaming figures based on certification alone.
