= The District Sleeps Alone Tonight =

2003 single by The Postal Service

Single by The Postal Service

from the album Give Up
- B-side: "'Suddenly Everything Has Changed'"
- Released: July 8, 2003
- Genre: Synth-pop; indietronica; electropop
- Length: 4:44
- Label: Sub Pop
- Songwriter(s): Ben Gibbard, Jimmy Tamborello
- Producer(s): The Postal Service

The Postal Service singles chronology
"Such Great Heights" (2003)	"The District Sleeps Alone Tonight" (2003)	"Against All Odds" (2004)

"The District Sleeps Alone Tonight" is a song by the electronic music band The Postal Service, the second single from their debut album, Give Up, released July 8, 2003 on Sub Pop Records. The single included a cover of "Suddenly Everything Has Changed" by The Flaming Lips, and two remixed tracks.

== Background ==
The song was written by Ben Gibbard and Jimmy Tamborello (also known by his stage name, Dntel), and recorded in early 2002. The "District" in the song's title is a reference to Washington, D.C., which is formally named "The District of Columbia" and called "The District" as a colloquial shorthand. Gibbard's girlfriend at the time had recently relocated to the area, and the song was inspired by an evening spent reconnecting when he visited on tour. The cover artwork for the single was designed by Kozyndan.

== In popular culture ==
In 2004, this song was featured in the soundtrack of the film D.E.B.S.

In 2013, Hrishikesh Hirway had an idea for a podcast, and asked his friend and Postal Service band member Jimmy Tamborello if he could record an interview him about "The District Sleeps Alone Tonight" to test the concept. That interview became the first episode of the Song Exploder podcast in January 2014. Ten years later, Tamborello was joined by Ben Gibbard for a Deluxe Anniversary Edition Song Exploder episode re-visiting the song.

In 2019, this song was featured in the first episode of Hulu limited series Looking for Alaska.

In September, 2024, the song was featured in Season 2, Episode 4 of the Hulu TV series Tell Me Lies.

== Cover versions ==
- Jonna Lee released a cover of this song as the b-side of her 2007 single Dried Out Eyes, calling it DC Sleeps Alone Tonight
- Allred covered this song on their 2008 album Covers
- The Hampdens covered the song on their 2008 album The Last Party
- Rich O'Toole covered this song on his 2008 album In a Minute or 2
- Frank Turner covered the song on his 2008 compilation album The First Three Years
- Sharif covered this song on his 2009 album Kisses and Lies
- Ben Marwood covers the song on his 2011 album Outside There's A Curse
- English musician Birdy covered the song in her 2011 debut studio album Birdy

== Track listing ==
1. "The District Sleeps Alone Tonight" – 4:44
2. "The District Sleeps Alone Tonight" (remix by DJ Downfall) – 6:55
3. "Such Great Heights" (remix by John Tejada) – 5:49
4. "Suddenly Everything Has Changed" (The Flaming Lips cover) – 3:52

== Certifications ==
Region	Certification	Certified units/sales
United States (RIAA)	Gold	500,000^{‡}
^{‡} Sales+streaming figures based on certification alone.
