= The Uninvited (soundtrack) =

2009 film soundtrack album

Film score by Christopher Young
- Released: February 10, 2009
- Genres: Soundtracks; Film scores
- Length: 48:43
- Label: Lakeshore Records

Christopher Young chronology
The Informers (2008)	The Uninvited (2009)	Drag Me to Hell (2009)

This is the soundtrack to the US horror remake The Uninvited. Its original score was composed by Christopher Young.

== Development ==
The original score for the film was composed by Christopher Young, who recorded it with a 78-piece orchestra and 20-person choir. His score features a glass harmonica and the Yale Women's Slavic Chorus. Sara Niemietz is the vocalist for the soundtrack and film score, having previously worked with Christopher Young in the same capacity on The Exorcism of Emily Rose (2005). Now an adult, she is an independent artist and cast-member of Postmodern Jukebox.

== Track listing ==
US edition

1. The Uninvited
2. Twice Told
3. At A Party
4. Glass Act
5. Bloody Milk
6. Christmas Corpse
7. Pairs In Love
8. Terror in the Water
9. Twined Nightmares
10. Cry Of Love
11. Working Dreams
12. The Screaming Bell
13. What Have You Done . . .
14. A Dance With No One
15. Sisters Anyways
