= Drag Me to Hell (soundtrack) =

Drag Me to Hell (Original Motion Picture Soundtrack)

Film score by Christopher Young
- Released: June 2, 2009
- Recorded: 2009
- Genre: Film score
- Length: 52:27
- Label: Lakeshore
- Producers: Brian McNelis; Flavio Motalla; Skip Williamson; Christopher Young

Christopher Young chronology
The Uninvited (2009)	Drag Me to Hell (2009)	Love Happens (2009)

Drag Me to Hell (Original Motion Picture Soundtrack) is the film score composed by Christopher Young to the 2009 film Drag Me to Hell directed by Sam Raimi. The album was released through Lakeshore Records on June 2, 2009, and a vinyl edition was published by Waxwork Records during October 2018. The score was acclaimed and Young won two awards at the International Film Music Critics Association.

== Development ==
Christopher Young composed the score for Drag Me to Hell, reuniting with Raimi after The Gift (2000) and Spider-Man 3 (2007). Raimi stated that emphasis was on using the soundtrack to create a world that didn't exist, a world of the "supernatural". For Young, this was an opportunity to return to his Evil Dead roots as well, which led to his voluntary involvement. When he saw the first cut, he was immediately connected with it owing to his return to the horror world and how it is about the devil, as Young previously did three films before that. In particular, Raimi also encouraged Young to experiment with the score.

The violin was the principal instrument in the score as it was historically attached to the Devil both in music and literature. Hence, he could not bring anything unique, though Young tried to imagine that the violin is being played with ten fingers. He noted that whoever plays the violin had to be responsible for initiating the pitch with either their bow or fingers on hand, while pressing the strings to obtain the pitch on the other. He then told Raimi to use both hands for playing the violin and not use the bow, thereby having the idea of stretching and expanding the violin through both hands which normal violinists could not do, which Raimi loved. Hence most of the violin material in the score could never be played by one person, but instead multiple tracking of one guy playing different tracks on top of the other. Besides the violin, the score also featured choir and pipe organ.

Elements of Young's previous work on Flowers in the Attic. (1987) is incorporated in the film through the utilization of the childlike soprano vocals recurrently appear in the score.

== Release ==
The soundtrack was released digitally on June 2, 2009, and in physical formats on August 18, 2009 through Lakeshore Records. A vinyl edition of the album was released by Waxwork Records in 2018.

== Reception ==
William Ruhlmann of AllMusic wrote that "[Young] conforms to the demands of the plot, often revving up his music to coincide with something particularly grisly on screen, with a tendency to create chaotic crescendos [...] but the score also contains delicate keyboard-based themes." Calling it as one of the best scores of 2009, Jonathan Broxton of Movie Music UK wrote "It's just that you so rarely hear scores like this these days; scores which are unafraid to unleash huge orchestral forces, which contain such wonderfully inventive and intricate instrumental and choral performances, which have this much intelligent design, and which are so entertaining on a purely visceral level." Thomas Klefner of Maintitles wrote "While this is top drawer writing for the horror genre this overall style of music has never been my cup of tea and it was difficult for me to get my teeth into it. The horror fan will have no trouble listening to it over and over."

Christian Clemmensen of Filmtracks wrote "the 52 minutes of music from Drag Me to Hell is inherently extremely unpredictable, suffering the trademarks of any adept horror score [...] to say that [Young] overachieved once again in a horror assignment is becoming the normal statement about such endeavors. This time, however, the overachievement is monumentally hell-raising." Sean Wilson of Mfiles wrote "a score designed to leave one drained but exhilarated – much like the film it accompanies". He further added, "Christopher Young's score is a coup for robust, old-fashioned, intelligence, crafted with care and attention. The theme is guaranteed to become a staple in the canon of classic horror movie themes in the years to come, but rather than lazily relying on that, Young conjures up a tour de force from start to finish."

Christopher Monfette of IGN wrote "stunningly appropriate and well-conceived score." Dana Stevens of Slate described it a "string-heavy, Psycho-esque score". Michael Gingold of Fangoria wrote "[Christopher Young] delivers a properly eerie/bombastic score." Richard von Busack of Metro Silicon Valley wrote "Christopher Young's inspired, crescendo-heavy soundtrack gets you juiced, with its shredded-violin references to [Camille] Saint-Saëns' Dance Macabre."

== Track listing ==
Drag Me to Hell (Original Motion Picture Soundtrack)
No.	Title	Length
1.	"Drag Me to Hell"	2:32
2.	"Mexican Devil Disaster"	4:33
3.	"Tale of a Haunted Banker"	1:52
4.	"Lamia"	4:06
5.	"Black Rainbows"	3:24
6.	"Ode to Ganush"	2:23
7.	"Familiar Familiars"	2:11
8.	"Loose Teeth"	6:31
9.	"Ordeal by Corpse"	4:35
10.	"Bealing Bells with Trumpet"	5:12
11.	"Brick Dogs Ala Carte"	1:46
12.	"Muttled Buttled Brain Stew"	2:51
13.	"Auto-Da-Fe"	4:31
14.	"Concerto to Hell"	5:58
Total length:		52:25

Drag Me to Hell (Complete Score)
No.	Title	Length
1.	"1M1 Mexican Devil"	2:30
2.	"1M2 Disaster"	0:58
3.	"1M3 Main Title"	2:33
4.	"1M3 Main Title (Alt)"	2:21
5.	"1M4 Christine"	1:52
6.	"1M4 Christine (Alt)"	1:26
7.	"1M6 Little Farm Girl"	0:27
8.	"1M8 You Shame Me"	0:52
9.	"2M1 The Parking Lot"	1:25
10.	"2M2A Car Brawl"	0:55
11.	"2M2B Loose Teeth"	0:57
12.	"2M2C Cursed By Lamia"	1:35
13.	"2M2 Loose Teeth (Alt)"	3:15
14.	"2M3 Strange Feeling"	0:32
15.	"2M5 Rham Jas's Visions"	0:49
16.	"2M6 Back To Home"	1:18
17.	"2M7 Haunting"	3:36
18.	"2M9 A Flying Intruder"	1:51
19.	"3M1 Ganush"	1:02
20.	"3M2 The Funeral"	0:16
21.	"3M3 Animal Offering"	0:48
22.	"3M4 Lamia Break In"	3:22
23.	"4M1 Meet Clay's Family"	1:04
24.	"4M4 Fake Attack"	0:59
25.	"4M5 The Promise"	2:11
26.	"5M1 A House Of Disaster"	1:48
27.	"5M2 The Spirits Portal"	5:12
28.	"5M3 Lamia"	4:06
29.	"5M4 The Beginning Of The End"	4:35
30.	"6M1 Uninvited Passenger"	2:51
31.	"6M2 Final Confrontation"	3:21
32.	"6M3 The Train Station"	1:46
33.	"6M4-5 Dragged & Hell Credits"	6:15
34.	"6M5 Hell Credits (Alt)"	5:59
Total length:		74:47

== Personnel ==
Credits adapted from AllMusic:

- Music composer and conductor – Christopher Young
- Music producers – Christopher Young, Flavio Motallo
- Orchestrators – Brandon Verrett, Christopher Young, David Shephard, Sean McMahon
- Music contractor – Simon James
- Programming – Andrew Spence, Greg Tripi, Jonathan Timpe, Max Blomgren
- Sound design – Andrew Spence, Christopher Young
- Recording and mixing – Robert Fernandez
- Music editor – Thomas Milano
- Music coordinator – Samantha Barker
- Score coordinator – James Speight, Joohyun Park, Peter Bateman, Sunna Wehrmeijer
- Executive producer – Brian McNelis, Skip Williamson
- A&R – Eric Craig
- Copyist – Robert Puff
- Layout – Joe Chavez
- Photography – Melissa Moseley
- Art direction – Stephanie Mente

== Accolades ==
Award	Category	Recipient	Result	Ref.
Fangoria Chainsaw Awards	Best Score	Christopher Young	Nominated	
International Film Music Critics Association	Film Score of the Year	Christopher Young	Nominated	
International Film Music Critics Association	Film Music Composition of the Year	Christopher Young – "Concerto Hall"	Won	
International Film Music Critics Association	Best Original Score for a Horror/Thriller Film	Christopher Young	Won	
Saturn Awards	Best Music	Christopher Young	Nominated	
