= Darla Vandenbossche =

Canadian actress (born 1963)

- Born: May 2, 1963; Surrey, British Columbia

Darla Vandenbossche (born May 2, 1963) is a Canadian actress.

== Career ==
Despite playing roles in high school theatre productions, it was not until she was 36 years old that Vandenbossche decided to pursue acting as a career. After working as a preschool teacher and a childcare counsellor with the Surrey School District for a decade each, and as a youth counsellor for homeless children and a youth recreation leader, she joined a theatre group in Vancouver. Her first play was Beyond Therapy, and she featured in a number of other productions including Four Dogs and a Bone. After four years of acting with the theatre group, she found herself an agent and began to attend auditions for roles in television and film. Although she found little success at first, rejected for the majority of her auditions, she was offered a number of small roles, the first of which was a 2004 episode of the television series Da Vinci's Inquest's seventh season. She also featured in minor roles in Masters of Horror, License to Wed and Why Did I Get Married?, although she is best known for her role in the 2007 Academy Award-nominated film Juno in which she plays the mother of the title character's boyfriend. Vandenbossche says of her role as Mrs. Bleeker: "This one was actually a character. I could make a history for her and a future for her." She appeared in the 2009 film Love Happens, starring Jennifer Aniston and Aaron Eckhart.

== Personal life ==
Vandenbossche's husband of eighteen years is Craig Vandenbossche, with whom she has two teenage sons, Kevin and Michael. She describes herself as a typical housewife and lives in Fleetwood, Surrey.
