= Against All Odds (Take a Look at Me Now) =

1984 single by Phil Collins

Single by Phil Collins

from the album Against All Odds: Music from the Original Motion Picture Soundtrack
- B-side: "Making a Big Mistake" (UK); "The Search" (US)
- Released: February 1984 (US); 26 March 1984 (UK)
- Recorded: 1983
- Genre: Pop; soft rock
- Length: 3:23
- Label: Virgin; Atlantic
- Songwriter: Phil Collins
- Producer: Arif Mardin

Phil Collins singles chronology
"Why Can't It Wait 'Til Morning" (1983)	"Against All Odds (Take a Look at Me Now)" (1984)	"Easy Lover" (1984)

Audio sample
- file; help

Music video
- "Against All Odds (Take a Look at Me Now)" on YouTube

"Against All Odds (Take a Look at Me Now)" (also titled "Against All Odds") is a song by English singer and songwriter Phil Collins recorded for the soundtrack to the 1984 film of the same name. The song is a power ballad in which its protagonist implores an ex-lover to "take a look at me now", knowing that reconciliation is "against all odds", but worth the gamble. The single reached number one on the Billboard Hot 100 in the United States, the first of seven for Collins in his solo career. It also topped the charts in Canada, Ireland, and Norway, while peaking at number two on the UK singles chart.

The song has been covered by several singers with some versions of which have been successful in both the US and UK markets. It has twice reached number one in the UK with the pairing of Mariah Carey and pop group Westlife in September 2000, and then by Steve Brookstein, the first winner of The X Factor, in January 2005.

== Background and development ==
Collins was approached to write the title song to the American neo-noir film Against All Odds (1984) while it was still in its preliminary "rough cut form". Director Taylor Hackford, who previously used a song for An Officer and a Gentleman (1982), planned to do the same for Against All Odds, which is a remake of Out of the Past (1947). When he signed with Atlantic Records, he was provided with a roster of artists, among whom Collins was chosen to render the film's theme song based on the quality of his voice.

At the time the soundtrack was being completed, Collins was on tour with Genesis. Hackford flew to Chicago to see one of the band's concerts. Collins watched the film on a videocassette recorder in his hotel room and agreed to appear on the soundtrack. Hackford said that it was a "textbook case of designing a song to reflect what the film is". The song appears in the film as background music during the closing credits.

Originally titled "How Can You Just Sit There?", the song's music was written by Collins during sessions for his debut solo album Face Value (1981), but it became discarded as it was his least favourite of the several ballads he wrote at the time. Nor was it included on Hello, I Must Be Going! (1982), as many newer songs were written for it. Collins eventually presented the demo to Hackford when approached to write a song for Against All Odds, which he loved. Collins then penned the lyrics, which were for the film. Due to lack of time available (as he was on tour with Genesis), he had arranger Arif Mardin produce it, and they worked on it over two days. The piano performance is by New York musician Rob Mounsey. Piano, keyboard bass and a string section arranged and conducted by Mardin were recorded at RCA Studios, New York, while Collins recorded vocals and drums in Los Angeles.

On episode 339 of This American Life, "Break Up", Collins relays that the song was inspired and written shortly after the breakup between him and his first wife. In the interview he says that the divorce transformed him from being a musician into also being a lyricist.

The song was first included on a Collins album on the 1998 compilation Hits, and it also appeared on his compilation Love Songs: A Compilation... Old and New (2004). A live performance of the song also appears on the Serious Hits... Live! album. In 2015, Collins released the original demo recording from the Face Value sessions as part of his Take A Look At Me Now project.

== Reception ==
"Against All Odds" won the Grammy Award for Best Pop Vocal Performance, Male in 1985, was nominated for Song of the Year and for an Academy Award as well as for a Golden Globe both in the Best Original Song categories. At the Academy Awards ceremony, Collins was not invited to sing his song on stage and instead sat in the audience as dancer Ann Reinking gave a mostly lip-synced vocal performance accompanied by a dance routine. Reinking's performance was poorly received by critics from the Los Angeles Times and People, as well as by Collins himself in a Rolling Stone interview.

When another song Collins performed for a film, "Separate Lives", was being nominated for an Academy Award, in interviews about the original snub by the Academy for "Against All Odds", Collins would jokingly say "the hell with him – I'm going up too", referring to what he would do if the Stephen Bishop-written song were to win the award. Collins lost to the Stevie Wonder song "I Just Called to Say I Love You".

Writing for her review of the film soundtrack, AllMusic's Heather Phares said that the film is best remembered for the inclusion of Collins' "classic theme song". Phares added that the song "remains not only one of Collins' definitive singles, but one of the 1980s' best love songs". Hackford had the same view, stating that it "decidedly" helped the film: people identified the song with the film and came to watch it. When the single reached the top five, it contributed to the increased box office sales of the film.

De facto Wu-Tang Clan leader RZA named "Against All Odds" as his favourite power ballad in an article on such songs in Spin. The Guardian and American Songwriter both named it as Collins' second-best solo song behind "In the Air Tonight".

== Commercial performance ==
"Against All Odds" became Collins' third top-ten single in the UK, peaking at #2 for three weeks in 1984. It was kept from the top spot by Lionel Richie's "Hello" for the first of these three weeks, and Duran Duran's "The Reflex" for the next two. It was ranked 14th in the year-end best-seller chart. In the U.S. and Canada, it peaked at No. 1 on the Billboard Hot 100 charts for three weeks in the spring of 1984 and four weeks on the Canadian RPM charts. Billboard ranked it as the No. 5 song for 1984 and RPM ranked it at No. 2.

== Music video ==
The single's music video was directed by Taylor Hackford, produced by Jeffrey Abelson through Parallax Productions and cinematographed by Daniel Pearl. Hackford was paid US$20,000 (out of a total budget of US$45,000) for a complete Collins clip. The music video was released in February 1984. A No. 1 MTV video for several weeks, MTV ranked it as No. 4 four in its 1984 year-end top 20 video countdown. Gary LeMel, music supervisor at Columbia, felt the music video on MTV increased Against All Odds' box office takings by at least US$5 million.

The concept for the video was created by Keith Williams, a Welsh-born writer who had already worked with Abelson on the video for "Dancing with Myself" (Billy Idol), and who would go on to also create concepts for "Holding Out for a Hero" (Bonnie Tyler) and "Ghostbusters" (Ray Parker Jr.) for the same producer as well as "Say You, Say Me" (Lionel Richie) from White Nights, which Hackford also directed.

The music video is an early example of a highly conceptual approach to creating hybrid movie/music-videos that producer Abelson pioneered. Echoing the love triangle theme of the film, Collins is seen performing in front of a wall of rainwater that is alternately lit red, blue, and green—each colour representing one of the three main characters in the film. It is this colour schematic that is used as an organic segue to and from character-specific scenes in the movie. The final scene pulls back from Collins to reveal him standing in the middle of a water-filled triangle formed from neon tubes in the same three colours—completing the visual concept as the three main characters are superimposed around the neon triangle's three sides.

== Personnel ==
- Phil Collins – vocals, drums
- Rob Mounsey – acoustic piano, keyboards, synthesizer bass
- Arif Mardin – orchestrations and conductor

== Charts ==
=== Weekly charts ===
Weekly chart performance for "Against All Odds (Take a Look at Me Now)"
Chart (1984–1985)	Peak position
Australia (Kent Music Report)	3
Austria (Ö3 Austria Top 40)	13
Belgium (Ultratop 50 Flanders)	4
Brazil (ABPD)	10
Canada Top Singles (RPM)	1
Canada Adult Contemporary (RPM)	1
Canada Retail Singles (The Record)	1
Denmark (Hitlisten)	2
Europe (European Hot 100 Singles)	1
Finland (Suomen virallinen lista)	5
France (SNEP)	20
Ireland (IRMA)	1
Israel (Israeli Singles Chart)	1
Italy (FIMI)	3
Netherlands (Dutch Top 40)	10
Netherlands (Single Top 100)	12
New Zealand (Recorded Music NZ)	3
Norway (VG-lista)	1
Paraguay (UPI)	3
Portugal (AFP)	1
South Africa (Springbok Radio)	9
Sweden (Sverigetopplistan)	3
Switzerland (Schweizer Hitparade)	4
UK Singles (Official Charts)	2
UK Airplay (Music & Media)	5
Uruguay (UPI)	8
US Billboard Hot 100	1
US Adult Contemporary (Billboard)	2
US Mainstream Rock Airplay (Billboard)	1
West Germany (GfK)	9

=== Year-end charts ===
Year-end chart performance for "Against All Odds (Take a Look at Me Now)"
Chart (1984)	Position
Australia (Kent Music Report)	21
Belgium (Ultratop Flanders)	55
Canada (RPM)	2
Netherlands (Dutch Top 40)	74
Netherlands (Single Top 100)	53
Switzerland (Schweizer Hitparade)	24
US Top Pop Singles (Billboard)	5
West Germany (Official German Charts)	67

== Certifications ==
Certifications for "Against All Odds (Take a Look at Me Now)"
Region	Certification	Certified units/sales
Denmark (IFPI Danmark)	Platinum	90,000^{‡}
France (SNEP) 2016 Remaster	Gold	100,000^{‡}
Italy (FIMI)	Gold	35,000^{‡}
New Zealand (RMNZ)	2× Platinum	60,000^{‡}
Poland (ZPAV)	Gold	25,000^{‡}
Spain (Promusicae)	Gold	30,000^{‡}
United Kingdom (BPI)	2× Platinum	1,200,000^{‡}
United States (RIAA)	Gold	1,000,000^{^}
^{^} Shipments figures based on certification alone.^{‡} Sales+streaming figures based on certification alone.

== Mariah Carey version ==
"Against All Odds (Take a Look at Me Now)"

Single by Mariah Carey

from the album Rainbow
- B-side: "Crybaby"
- Released: 29 May 2000
- Recorded: 1999
- Studio: Flyte Tyme Studios (Edina, Minnesota); Capri Digital Studios (Capri, Italy)
- Genre: Pop; R&B
- Length: 3:25
- Label: Columbia
- Songwriter: Phil Collins
- Producers: Mariah Carey; Jimmy Jam and Terry Lewis

Mariah Carey singles chronology
"Crybaby" (2000)	"Against All Odds (Take a Look at Me Now)" (2000)	"Against All Odds (Take a Look at Me Now)" (Westlife remix) (2000)

Music video
- "Against All Odds (Take a Look at Me Now)" on YouTube

American singer Mariah Carey recorded and co-produced her version of the song with Jimmy Jam and Terry Lewis for her seventh studio album Rainbow (1999). It was released on 29 May 2000, as the fourth single from the album, by Columbia Records.

Although the song was promoted as part of Rainbow in the United States, it was not released as a commercial or a radio single there. The song peaked at number two in Norway, while reaching the top 20 in numerous European countries. The music video for Carey's version of the song, directed by Paul Misbehoven, consists of a montage of clips of Carey singing the song from her various Rainbow World Tour stops. Another version of the song, with Irish boy band Westlife, was also released, and reached number one on the UK chart.

=== Critical reception ===
"Against All Odds (Take a Look at Me Now)" received positive reviews. Danyel Smith of Entertainment Weekly wrote: "Listeners with an eye on the tabloids could read her close, ringing interpretation of Phil Collins' 1984 hit, 'Against All Odds (Take a Look at Me Now)', as a postmortem on her bittersweet affair with Yankee shortstop Derek Jeter and a poignant evocation of the couple's shared mixed-race heritage ('You're the only one who really knew me at all')." Los Angeles Times' Elysa Gardner called this cover "surprisingly faithful, forthright" and "she resists her tendency to over-embellish notes and focuses on what really matters: the melody and lyrics".

MTV Asia editor Dara Cook wrote: "Mariah festoons herself in Phil Collins' 1980s melodic garb, appropriately pret a porter with overwrought emotion. She delicately ascends the sparely accompanied first verses—but alas, that damn drum roll soon sounds and the bouffant strings and vocal gymnastics ensue." Rolling Stone's Arion Berger was not happy with the cover selection which he called a "drippy Eighties power-pop hit".

=== Westlife duet version ===
"Against All Odds" (featuring Westlife)

Single by Mariah Carey featuring Westlife

from the album Coast to Coast
- Released: September 15, 2000
- Recorded: 1999–2000
- Studio: Flyte Tyme (Edina); Capri Digital (Capri); Rokstone; Olympic (London); Parc (Orlando)
- Genre: Pop; R&B
- Length: 3:25
- Label: Columbia
- Songwriter: Phil Collins
- Producers: Mariah Carey; Steve Mac

Mariah Carey singles chronology
"Against All Odds (Take a Look at Me Now)" (2000)	"Against All Odds" (featuring Westlife) (2000)	"Loverboy" (2001)

Westlife singles chronology
"Fool Again" (2000)	"Against All Odds" (2000)	"My Love" (2000)

Music video
- "Against All Odds" on YouTube

Carey later released a duet version of the song, simply titled "Against All Odds", featuring newly recorded vocals by Irish boy band Westlife. The song was released as the first single from the band's second album, Coast to Coast (2000). The song was released on September 15, 2000. Carey's vocals from the solo version were retained for the duet, though a new instrumental track was produced by Carey and Steve Mac, featuring a more organic sound with violins. The music video shows Carey and Westlife recording the song and exploring the island of Capri by boat.

The single debuted at number one in the United Kingdom, selling 112,000 copies. It remained at number one in its second week, selling a further 78,500 copies. The song became Carey's second to top the UK Singles Chart and Westlife's sixth consecutive number one. As of November 2021, the song has sold 507,000 copies in the country. It is Westlife's sixth biggest selling single (paid-for sales and combined sales categories) of all-time and their fifteenth most streamed single in the United Kingdom.

The song also spent two weeks at number one in Scotland and three in Ireland. It peaked at number three on the continental chart, European Hot 100 Singles. Its chart success in European countries led to its inclusion on the international editions of Carey's compilation albums Greatest Hits (2001) and #1 to Infinity (2015).

=== Track listings ===
Mariah Carey version:

- 12" single
1. "Against All Odds (Take a Look at Me Now)" (Pound Boys main mix) – 9:09
2. "Against All Odds (Take a Look at Me Now)" (Pound Boys radio edit) – 3:37
3. "Against All Odds (Take a Look at Me Now)" (Pound Boys deep dub) – 8:12
4. "Against All Odds (Take a Look at Me Now)" (Pound Boys dub) – 6:56
- CD single
1. "Against All Odds (Take a Look at Me Now)" – 3:25
2. "Crybaby" – 5:19
3. "Thank God I Found You" (Stargate radio edit) – 4:21
4. "Can't Take That Away" (Morales club mix edit) – 3:57

Mariah Carey featuring Westlife version:

- UK CD single 1
1. "Against All Odds" – 3:21
2. "Against All Odds" (Pound Boys main mix) – 9:09
3. "Against All Odds" (Mariah only version) – 3:21
4. "Westlife Interview" (CD extra video version)
- UK CD single 2
1. "Against All Odds" – 3:21
2. "Against All Odds" (Westlife only version) – 3:21
3. "Against All Odds" (Pound Boys dub) – 6:48
4. "Against All Odds" (CD extra video version)
- UK cassette single
1. "Against All Odds" – 3:21
2. "Against All Odds" (Pound Boys radio edit) – 3:37
- Japanese CD single
1. "Against All Odds" – 3:20
2. "Against All Odds" (album version) – 3:26
3. "Against All Odds" (Pound Boys radio edit) – 3:32
4. "Against All Odds" (instrumental) – 3:20
- 2021 digital EP
1. "Against All Odds (Take a Look at Me Now)" (with Westlife) – 3:21
2. "Against All Odds (Take a Look at Me Now)" (Mariah only) – 3:25
3. "Against All Odds (Take a Look at Me Now)" (Pound Boys radio edit) – 3:37
4. "Against All Odds (Take a Look at Me Now)" (Pound Boys main mix) – 9:09
5. "Against All Odds (Take a Look at Me Now)" (Pound Boys deep dub) – 8:12
6. "Against All Odds (Take a Look at Me Now)" (Pound Boys dub) – 6:56

=== Weekly charts ===
Original version

Chart (2000)	Peak position
Belgium (Ultratop 50 Flanders)	26
Belgium (Ultratop 50 Wallonia)	15
Czech Republic (Rádio – Top 100)	10
European Hot 100 Singles (Music & Media)	36
France (SNEP)	18
Germany (Official German Charts)	29
Italy (FIMI)	17
Netherlands (Dutch Top 40) with "Crybaby"	27
Netherlands (Single Top 100)	20
Norway (VG-lista)	2
Portugal (AFP)	9
Switzerland (Schweizer Hitparade)	20
US NAC/Smooth Jazz (Radio & Records)	28

Westlife remix

Chart (2000)	Peak position
Australia (ARIA)	52
Belgium (Ultratop 50 Flanders)	50
Belgium (Ultratop 50 Wallonia)	31
Croatia International Airplay (HRT)	2
Denmark (IFPI)	2
European Hot 100 Singles (Music & Media)	3
Europe (European Hit Radio)	29
Ireland (IRMA)	1
Japan (Oricon)	78
Netherlands (Dutch Top 40)	35
Netherlands (Single Top 100)	29
Netherlands Airplay (Music & Media)	12
Poland Airplay (Music & Media)	16
Portugal (AFP)	4
Scottish Singles Sales (Official Charts)	1
Sweden (Sverigetopplistan)	3
UK Singles (Official Charts)	1
UK Airplay (Music Week)	10

=== Year-end charts ===
Original version

Chart (2000)	Position
Belgium (Ultratop 50 Wallonia)	42
France (SNEP)	74
Netherlands (Dutch Top 40)	200
Switzerland (Schweizer Hitparade)	93

Westlife remix

Chart (2000)	Position
Brazil (Crowley)	95
Europe (Eurochart Hot 100)	47
Europe (European Hit Radio)	34
Ireland (IRMA)	8
Sweden (Hitlistan)	47
UK Singles (OCC)	28

Chart (2001)	Position
Taiwan (Hito Radio)	58

=== Certifications and sales ===
Westlife remix

Region	Certification	Certified units/sales
Denmark (IFPI Danmark)	Gold	4,576
Sweden (GLF)	Gold	15,000^{^}
United Kingdom (BPI)	Platinum	600,000^{‡}
^{^} Shipments figures based on certification alone.^{‡} Sales+streaming figures based on certification alone.

==== Release history ====
Release dates and formats for "Against All Odds (Take a Look at Me Now)"
Region	Date	Format(s)	Version	Label(s)	Ref.
Various	29 May 2000	CD; maxi CD	Original	Columbia	
Netherlands	15 September 2000	CD	Original	Sony Music	
United Kingdom	18 September 2000	Cassette; maxi CD	Westlife remix	Columbia	
France	25 September 2000	Maxi CD	Westlife remix	Columbia	
Japan	27 September 2000	Maxi CD	Westlife remix	Sony Music Japan	
Australia	23 October 2000	CD	Westlife remix	Columbia	
Various	9 October 2020	Digital download; streaming (EP)	Original and Westlife remix	Legacy	

== The Postal Service version ==
"Against All Odds"

Promotional single by the Postal Service

from the album Wicker Park (Soundtrack Album)
- Released: 1 September 2004
- Genre: Indietronica; indie pop; synth-pop
- Length: 3:50
- Label: Sub Pop
- Songwriter: Phillip David Charles Collins

The Postal Service singles chronology
"The District Sleeps Alone Tonight" (2003)	"Against All Odds" (2004)	"We Will Become Silhouettes" (2005)

Indie pop supergroup the Postal Service recorded a cover of "Against All Odds (Take a Look at Me Now)" for the soundtrack to the 2004 romantic thriller drama film Wicker Park, which was released as a promotional single by the group's label Sub Pop two days prior to the film's release.

=== Reception ===
In 2013, Rolling Stone ranked the Postal Service's version of "Against All Odds (Take a Look at Me Now)" as one of the "10 most killer cover songs of the past decade", calling it "much more intimate" than Phil Collins' original version. Online music magazine The Fire Note called the cover "solid" in their review of the deluxe version of the group's sole studio album Give Up. Pitchfork was less positive of the cover, calling it "awkward in both conception and execution."

== Steve Brookstein version ==
"Against All Odds"

Single by Steve Brookstein

from the album Heart and Soul
- Released: 20 December 2004
- Recorded: 2004
- Genre: Pop rock
- Length: 3:12
- Label: Sony BMG
- Songwriter: Phil Collins

Steve Brookstein singles chronology
"Against All Odds" (2004)	"Fighting Butterflies" (2006)

English singer and The X Factor winner Steve Brookstein included "Against All Odds" on his debut studio album, Heart and Soul (2005). It was released as his debut single on 20 December 2004 by Sony BMG proceeds went to the Asian Tsunami Fund.

=== Background ===
In 2004, Brookstein won the televised UK talent competition The X Factor, and recorded a cover of the Phil Collins 1984 hit "Against All Odds" as his debut single. It entered the UK Singles Chart at number two behind "Do They Know It's Christmas?" by Band Aid 20, and then climbed to number one, where it stayed for one week from 2 January 2005 to 8 January 2005 and was replaced by Elvis Presley's "Jailhouse Rock". "Against All Odds" was later included on Brookstein's debut album Heart and Soul.

=== Chart performance ===
"Against All Odds" debuted at number two in the United Kingdom, behind Band Aid 20's version of "Do They Know It's Christmas?", and at number 11 in Ireland. It charted at number one in the UK the following week. "Against All Odds" sold 127,701 copies in its first week in the UK, the lowest first-week sales for an X Factor winner's single until 2015. Brookstein's version has sold 204,000 copies in the UK to date, making it the lowest-selling X Factor winner's single. It has sold fewer than half the copies of Leon Jackson's "When You Believe" and Little Mix's "Cannonball", a third of Joe McElderry's "The Climb", a quarter of Leona Lewis's "A Moment Like This", and a fifth of those of Matt Cardle's "When We Collide", Shayne Ward's "That's My Goal", James Arthur's "Impossible" and Alexandra Burke's "Hallelujah". The next fewest sales from a winner's song was Sam Bailey's version of "Skyscraper", which had first-week sales of 149,000 copies, 26,000 more than "Against All Odds". However, Louisa Johnson, Matt Terry and Rak Su would all have lower first week sales in later years.

=== Track listing ===
1. "Against All Odds" – 3:17
2. "Smile" (The X Factor performance) – 1:55
3. "Help Me Make It Through the Night" (The X Factor performance) – 2:00

=== Weekly charts ===
Chart (2004–2005)	Peak position
Ireland (IRMA)	11
Scottish Singles Sales (Official Charts)	1
UK Singles (Official Charts)	1

=== Year-end charts ===
Chart (2004)	Position
UK Singles (OCC)	30
Chart (2005)	Position
UK Singles (OCC)	127

== Liquid I.V. version ==
In 2026, a Super Bowl LX commercial called "Take a Look"for the hydration multiplier drink mix product where toilets, urinals and even a portable bathroom sing a cover of the song as it encourages its viewers to "take a look at your pee" and do a better job hydrating it if its yellow.

== See also ==
- List of Billboard Hot 100 number-one singles of 1984
- List of number-one singles from the 2000s (UK)
- List of number-one singles of 2000 (Ireland)
