= Give Up =

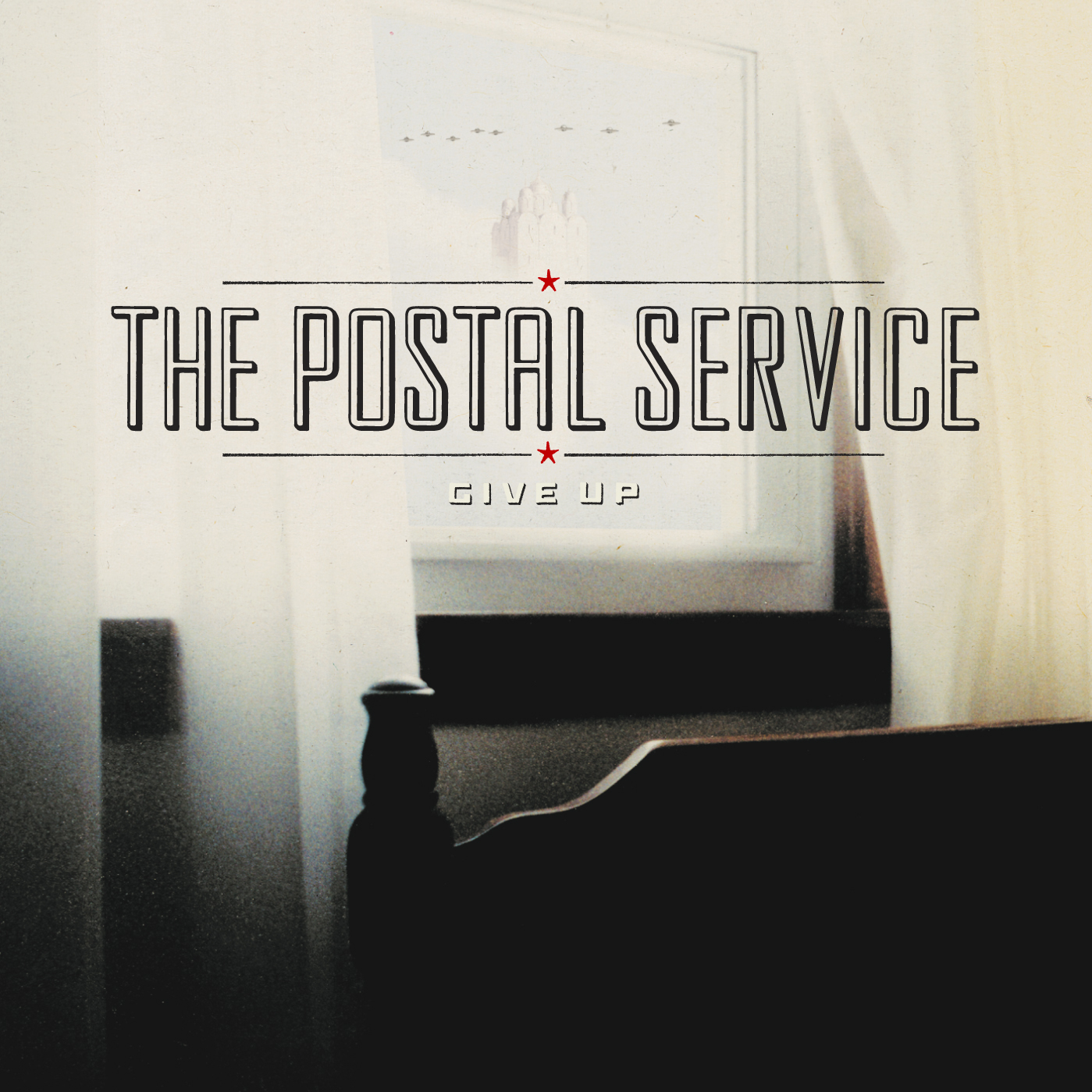
- Cover art by Al Columbia

Studio album by the Postal Service
- Released: February 19, 2003
- Recorded: December 2001 – 2002
- Studios: Dying Songs (Los Angeles); Computerworld (Seattle)
- Genres: Indietronica; indie pop; synth-pop
- Length: 44:53
- Label: Sub Pop
- Producer: The Postal Service

Singles from Give Up
- 1. "Such Great Heights" Released: January 2003; 2. "The District Sleeps Alone Tonight" Released: July 8, 2003; 3. "We Will Become Silhouettes" Released: February 8, 2005

Give Up is the only studio album by the American electronic duo the Postal Service. The album released on February 19, 2003, through Sub Pop Records. The Postal Service was a collaboration between singer-songwriter Ben Gibbard, best known for his work with indie rock band Death Cab for Cutie, and musician Jimmy Tamborello, who also records under the name Dntel. Gibbard rose to prominence in the early 2000s as frontman of Death Cab, while Tamborello gained a cult following as a pioneer of contemporary glitch music and electronica. The two first collaborated with the song "(This Is) The Dream of Evan and Chan", for Dntel's debut album, Life Is Full of Possibilities (2001).

The album is a long-distance collaboration between Gibbard, who lived in Seattle, Washington, and Tamborello, who resided in Los Angeles, California. The duo named the project for their working method: the pair would send demos on burned CD-R's through the mail, adding elements until songs were complete. The LP's sound contrasts manipulated samples and keyboards with live guitar and drums—a sound some have described as "indietronica". Tamborello was responsible for the programming, while Gibbard wrote lyrics, provided vocals, and contributed additional instrumentation. Give Up also features guest appearances from vocalists Jenny Lewis of Rilo Kiley and Jen Wood, as well as musician Chris Walla, who was an instrumentalist, songwriter, and producer for Death Cab for Cutie.

Give Up was released with little promotion—the group embarked on a brief tour together, but otherwise returned to their main projects. Despite this, the album grew in popularity steadily in the ensuing years, bolstered by the singles "Such Great Heights" and "We Will Become Silhouettes". By the end of its first decade, it had sold 1.2 million copies in the U.S., making it Sub Pop's second-biggest selling album in its history. It also courted a trademark battle with the United States Postal Service and a dispute with Apple. Despite its popularity, Give Up stands as the duo's only studio album. In 2013, the group briefly reunited for an anniversary tour and reissue of the album. In 2023, the band embarked on a 20th anniversary tour.

== Background ==
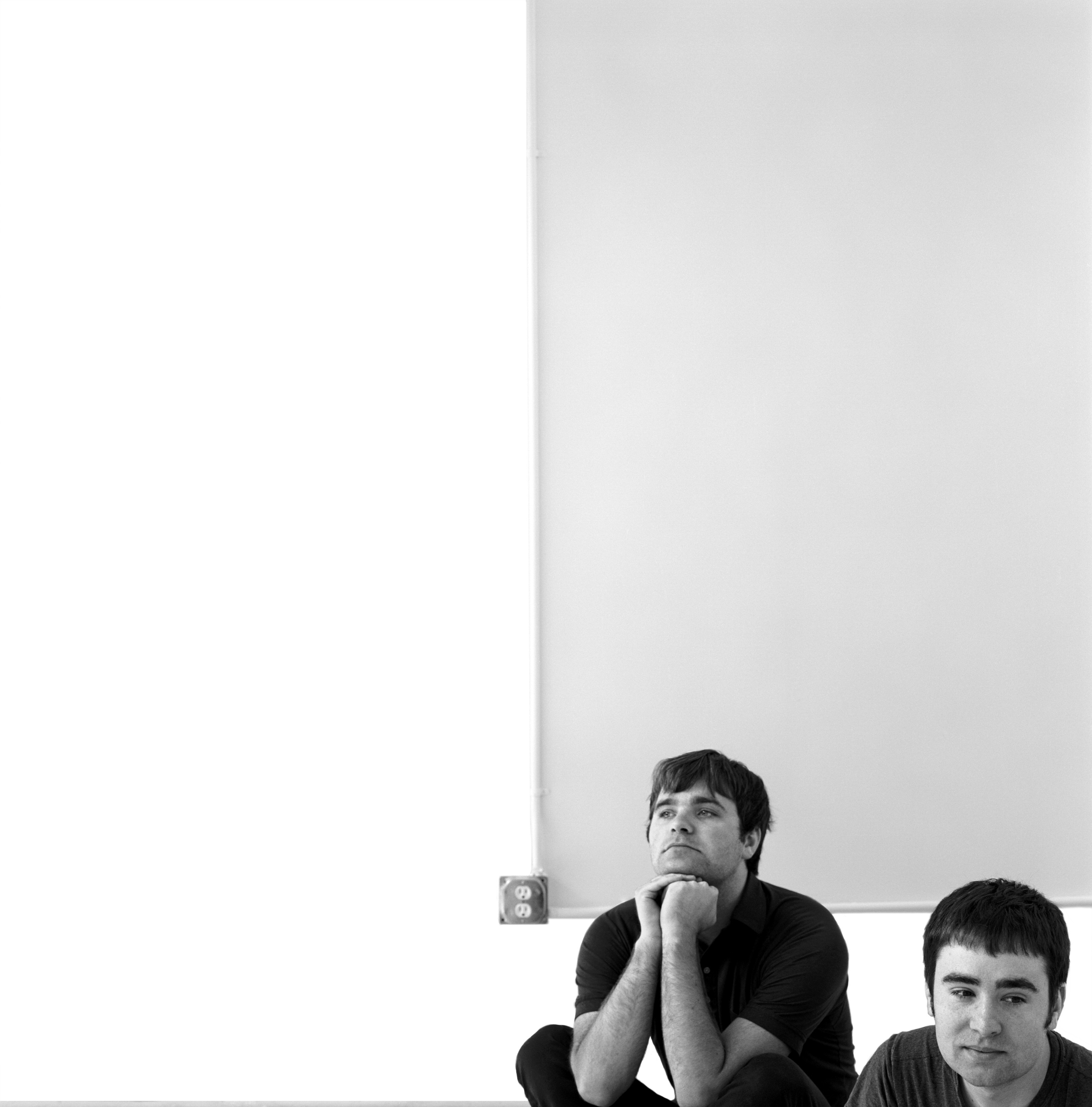
A promotional photo of Gibbard and Tamborello, shot by Brian Tamborello.

The Postal Service is a collaboration between singer-songwriter Ben Gibbard and electronic musician Dntel (Jimmy Tamborello). Gibbard rose to prominence in the early 2000s as frontman of the indie rock band Death Cab for Cutie, while Tamborello gained a cult following as a pioneer of contemporary glitch music and electronica. In 2001, Tamborello released his first album under the Dntel moniker, titled Life Is Full of Possibilities, which features several guest vocalists. The LP featured the duo's first collaboration, with the song "(This Is) The Dream of Evan and Chan". The pair had met through Tamborello's roommate, Pedro Benito, who was in the indie rock group the Jealous Sound, a band that had toured with Death Cab. When Gibbard stayed at their apartment for several days, Tamborello recruited him to contribute to the album.

Gibbard and Tamborello came from distinctly different musical backgrounds, and did not know each other well. Tamborello—then based outside Los Angeles—came up as a member of the electropop band Figurine, with whom he'd released two albums. Gibbard, meanwhile, had released three albums with his indie rock outfit Death Cab, who were based in Seattle, Washington. The band nearly disbanded after an argument on tour in October 2001; after returning home, the group decided to take a brief hiatus, setting the stage for a side-project. Though the pair did not initially connect on a personal level in a strong sense—with Gibbard more sociable and Tamborello often reserved—they continued to collaborate. Gibbard suggested the two release an extended play (EP) of their work.

Tamborello had contacts at famed Seattle-based record label Sub Pop, best known for releasing albums by Nirvana and Sleater-Kinney. Tony Kiewel, who had gone to college with Tamborello, had recently begun working for Sub Pop in their A&R division. He proposed that they release a full-length album as opposed to an EP, noting that the former received more attention than the latter. "If you're going to do it, do a full album," he told the duo. "People will review it, and you can sell it for three times as much." The duo signed a joint record deal with Sub Pop, and work on what became Give Up began in earnest in December 2001.

== Recording and production ==
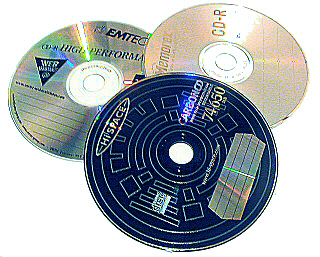
The pair sent one another burned CD-Rs through the mail to create the album.

The production process behind Give Up involved Tamborello, based in the L.A. community of Silver Lake, sending Gibbard, living north in Seattle, pieces of instrumental music on burned CD-Rs. Gibbard would pick up the disc from Sub Pop's corporate office and return to his home in the Capitol Hill district. He would insert the CD into his portable Discman player and walk around his neighborhood, humming melodies to the music. He also carried a notebook to compile his ideas, which he would use when home to write lyrics. Gibbard would then manipulate the recordings on his laptop, augmenting the beats with additional guitar, keyboards, and live drums. He dubbed his home studio "Computerworld". Gibbard, who had always found composing music to be more difficult than writing lyrics, found the arrangement particularly appealing. "It was really great to get a little package every month or two – 'Two new songs!'" he noted in 2002. "Sometimes I'd say, 'I want to move that part and this part,' and it was really fun to have such autonomy in the writing; I could pretty much do whatever I wanted."

Tamborello, operating from his L.A. home studio he called Dying Songs, contributed more-or-less finished bed tracks. The first two songs he sent developed into "Brand New Colony" and "The District Sleeps Alone Tonight", which were completed over the course of a week. The pair worked at a pace of two or three songs per month. As Gibbard did not know Tamborello very well, he was nervous he would not respond to his contributions positively. "I really thought he was gonna be like, 'How dare you do this to my songs?'" he said. Initially, Tamborello was challenged by Gibbard's vocal suggestions. "When you're just writing the music, you come up with your own vocal melodies. But Ben's ideas were totally different," he told the BBC. The two were relative strangers from distinctly different musical backgrounds; "It was like having to work on the album and make friends at the same time," he admitted. Tamborello admitted he expected the album to be more experimental than it turned out to be.

"At the end of the '90s into the early aughts, electronic music had become very niche and process oriented. It was serious music; it was very underground. It wasn't music that people listened to for fun. We were in the right place at the right time to resurrect the craftsmanship of that early '80s electronic music via Orchestral Manoeuvres in the Dark, Depeche Mode, or the Human League. We were in the right place at the right time to meld these two styles of a confessional, emotional kind of indie rock and this vocabulary of electronic music that Jimmy is incredibly versed in."

— Ben Gibbard

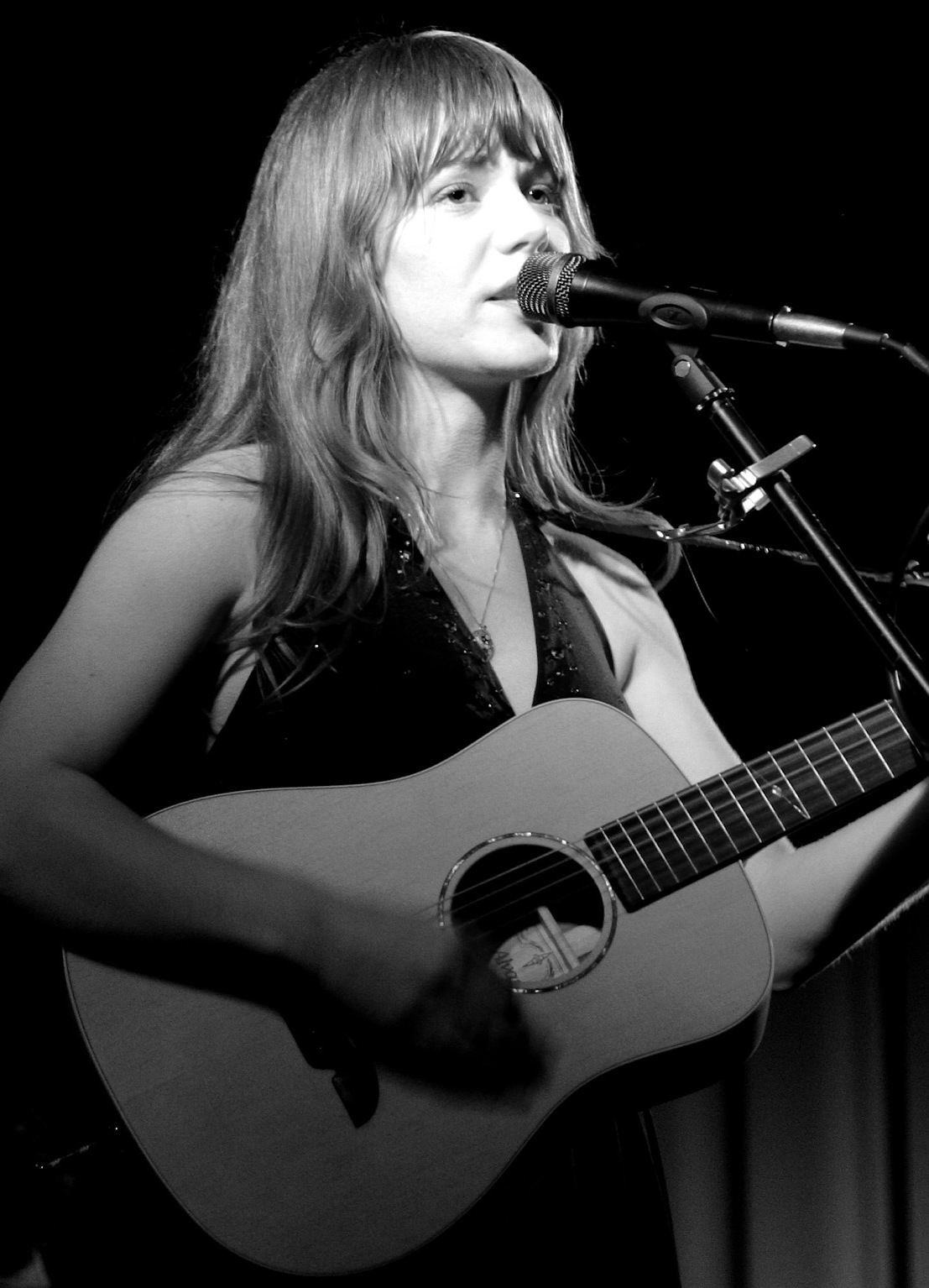
Give Up includes guest vocals from singer-songwriter Jenny Lewis, who sings on half of its tracks.

The album has several guest musicians, including Jen Wood, a solo artist formerly of the band Tattle Tale, and Jenny Lewis, then known for her work with Rilo Kiley. Wood had previously toured with Death Cab, and she and Gibbard were longtime friends. He invited her to contribute via e-mail, and the resulting session took only two hours. Wood provides backing vocals on "Such Great Heights" and "Nothing Better". Next, Gibbard phoned Lewis to gauge her interest, who was at that time recording with Rilo Kiley in Omaha, Nebraska. She excitedly agreed to join the project, and the two met for the first time when she picked Gibbard up from the Burbank airport. She recorded her contributions over a period of several days; on the final LP, over half of the album's track listing features her backing vocals, which were recorded in Tamborello's bedroom. Additional recording on the LP took place at the Hall of Justice, a studio in Seattle's Ballard neighborhood, during the spring of 2002. Chris Walla, a member of Death Cab, had purchased the studio two years prior. Walla recorded the live accompaniment, and guested on piano on "Nothing Better".

Though the initial press release for the album states that it was completed in ten months, other sources claim it was completed in half that time. Gibbard flew to Los Angeles only twice during the production of the album. The first was to oversee Lewis's contribution, and also record additional vocals. The duo came to feel that Gibbard's original demo vocals were better, and they discarded much of the new vocal takes. The second trip was to be involved in the mixing process. Both musicians mixed the album in Tamborello's bedroom; he noted that it was simply too involved a process to conduct via the mail. Ironically, despite the final name they chose for the project, they did not use the United States Postal Service as a courier; the CDs were sent through either FedEx or UPS. Kiewel remarked in a 2013 interview that Give Up was one of the "cheapest records Sub Pop ever made." Though he withheld the final number, he revealed the project had a very small budget, and that when combined, the five LPs the label distributed that year cost less than $50,000.

== Composition ==
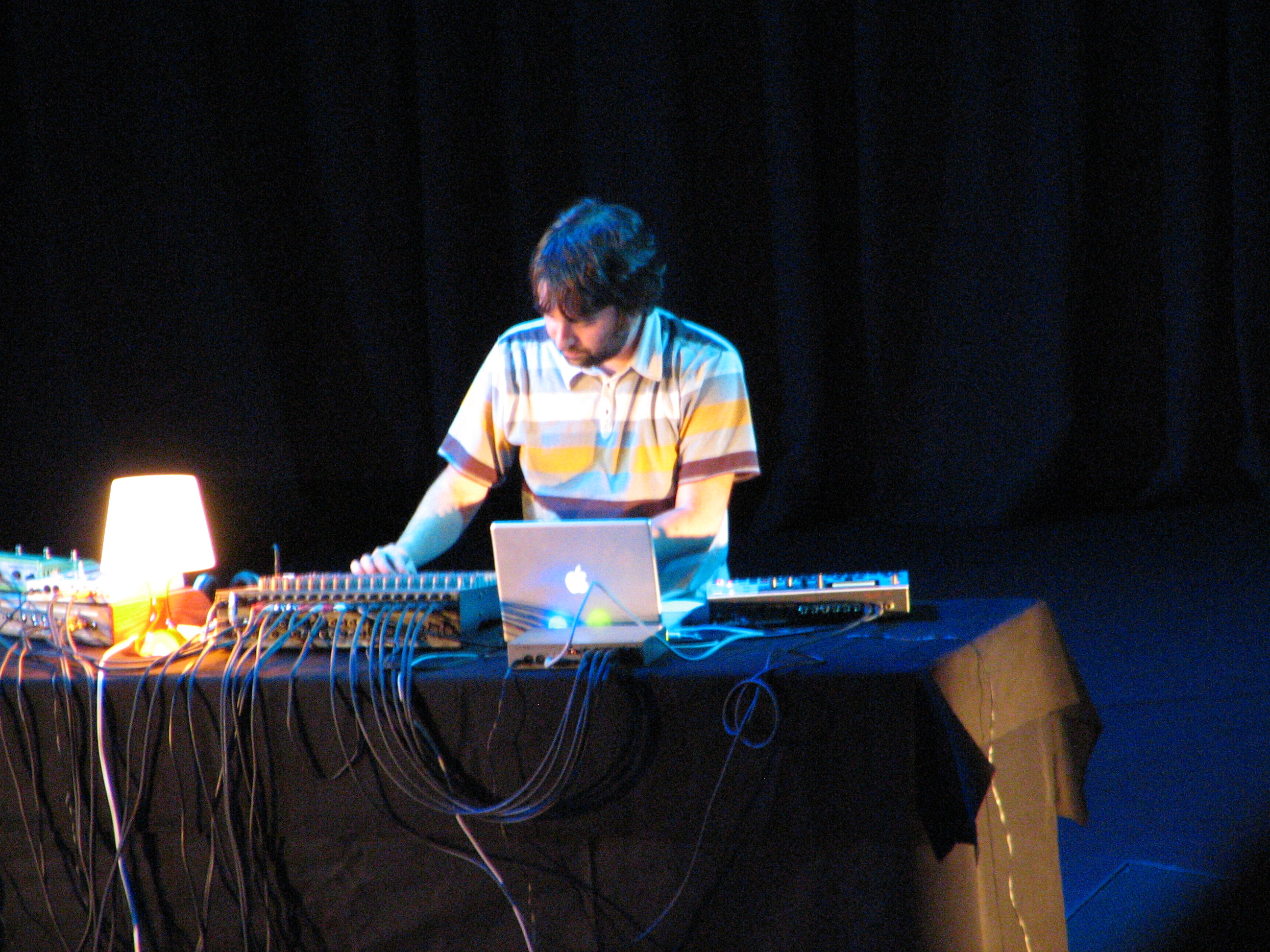
Tamborello, seen here in 2006, composed the beats using a K2000RS sampler connected to a Macintosh Quadra and PowerBook G4.

Give Up is considered a combination of indie rock and electronic music—dubbed by some "indietronica". MTV's Brian Wallace described the sound of the album as a collision between "moody indie rock with the manipulated samples, keyboards and beats of IDM electronica." Programmed elements are accentuated with acoustic guitars and live drums. Critics compared it to the eighties synthpop and new wave genres. Pitchfork Media's Matt LeMay and AllMusic's Heather Phares both commented on the contrasts between the "cool, clean synths" and Gibbard's vocal melodies. Nearly every synthesized element on the album uses the Kurzweil K2000RS, a sampler. The device came with bass and synthesizer presets, though Tamborello would significantly alter each preset to make it more original. His computer at the time was a Macintosh Quadra, which was not sufficiently powerful enough to record audio with. Tamborello used it as a sequencer, controlling the K2000RS with MIDI. He would program the drum patterns in the computer. He also used an Apple PowerBook G4, a small laptop computer, to record the album.

Lyrically, the album touches on themes of love, as well as fame, history, and friendship. On both Give Up and Transatlanticism, the Death Cab for Cutie album released the same year, Gibbard lyrically explores distance and "the ability of relationships to survive [separation]." Gibbard noted that "District", "Brand New Colony", and "This Place is a Prison" were the only strictly autobiographical songs: "Everything else is just kind of daydreaming and coming up with ideas for songs that aren't necessarily based in reality, and I think that was a lot more fun for me to do because I'd never really done that before," he said in 2002. Alexia Loundras of the BBC observed that the album offers a melancholy but hopeful sentiment. Portions of Give Up were inspired by the break-up of what Gibbard called his "first real adult relationship." The split occurred because of how much time Gibbard devoted to music. Afterwards, his former partner relocated to Washington, D.C., which inspired "The District Sleeps Alone Tonight".

"The District Sleeps Alone Tonight" opens with a series of moody, deep-sounding chords designed to emulate the sound of an organ—an edited version of a K2000RS preset called NeoProfit. The first half of the song's drum programming was inspired by the Björk album Homogenic (1997), while the second half, with its four on the floor pattern, was inspired by the work of Lali Puna and the German record label Morr Music. Gibbard wrote "Such Great Heights" as a love song for a girl he was interested in at the time. He noted that the relationship ended rather quickly, rendering the song's meaning rather pointless. The song came together late in the recording process, and was one of the last songs the duo completed in June 2002. Its genesis came together "incredibly quickly," according to Gibbard, who felt it "seemingly came out of nowhere. It did feel that there was some sort of spiritual transcendence happening and the song being beamed down to me." For Gibbard, the song was a thematic departure from his more melancholy subject matter: "I think 'Such Great Heights' is the first time I've ever written a positive love song," he told Rolling Stone, "where it's a song about being in love and how it's rad, rather than having your heart broken."

"Sleeping In" alludes to Lee Harvey Oswald, the man responsible for assassinating U.S. President John F. Kennedy in 1963. "Nothing Better" is a duet with Wood, and functions as a conversation between the two. The track was directly inspired by the Human League's "Don't You Want Me". In "Clark Gable", named after the famed twentieth-century actor, Gibbard sings of making home movies with a former lover. "We Will Become Silhouettes" centers on an impending apocalypse. It was inspired by a survivalist phase Gibbard went through after the September 11 attacks, where he felt convinced the world was soon to end.

== Commercial performance ==
Give Up has been considered a sleeper hit—its reaction was initially muted, but grew steadily via word-of-mouth in the following years. The LP arrived with virtually no promotion; besides the ensuing tour, there was "little mainstream press, and airplay [was] confined to college stations and public radio." In its first four months of release, it moved between 2,000 and 3,000 units per week. During the week of Christmas in 2003, the LP had its overall best sales, selling 9,000 copies in a week. Through their relationship with the Alternative Distribution Alliance, Sub Pop began to carry the album at larger retailers, such as Tower Records, Virgin Megastore, and Best Buy. Megan Jasper, then the general manager at the label, estimated that Best Buy moved the most product of the three. Billboard's Michael Paolettta broke down that sixty percent of its sales at that time came from retail chains, thirty percent through independent record shops, and the remaining ten percent from "mass merchants and nontraditional sellers."

"Such Great Heights" was the album's first single, released as a physical, four-track CD single in January 2003. The duo both jokingly referred to it as "the hit" of the album when writing it. The disc charted on Billboard's Hot 100 Singles Sales chart, a ranking that only measured in-store purchases. Sub Pop offered a free download of the song on their official website, which had been downloaded over nine million times by August 2005; over four million users downloaded the song from the label's MySpace page. In January 2004, influential L.A. radio station KROQ-FM began playing "Such Great Heights", which bolstered the album's popularity. An acoustic rendition of the tune by Iron & Wine aided in boosting its profile; both were simultaneously popular, with Iron & Wine's version used in the film and soundtrack for Garden State, as well as in television advertisements for M&M's. The original version was licensed for commercials for Target, Ask.com, UPS, Telstra, and Kaiser Permanente. The song was the original theme song to medical drama Grey's Anatomy, and appears on its first soundtrack. Within two years of its debut, "Such Great Heights" was certified gold for sales of over 500,000 copies by the Recording Industry Association of America (RIAA). "The District Sleeps Alone Tonight", the album's second single, peaked at number 3 on the Hot Dance Singles Sales chart.

The LP did not debut on Billboard's all-genre Top 200 Albums chart until thirteen months after its release, which was credited to its slow-building online buzz and licensing in TV commercials. During its initial release, the album peaked at number 114. It spent 111 weeks altogether on the Independent Albums chart, peaking at number three, and also peaked at number four on its Top Heatseekers chart. Give Up spent nineteen non-consecutive weeks at the top of the publication's Top Electronic Albums chart; in total, it logged over 90 weeks on the chart. It was number two album for that chart's year-end ranking for 2004, with Billboard's Paoletta characterizing it as "the little album that could." Sales of the album and singles on the nascent iTunes Music Store were high, with Give Up also routinely topping the platform's Top Electronic Albums chart.

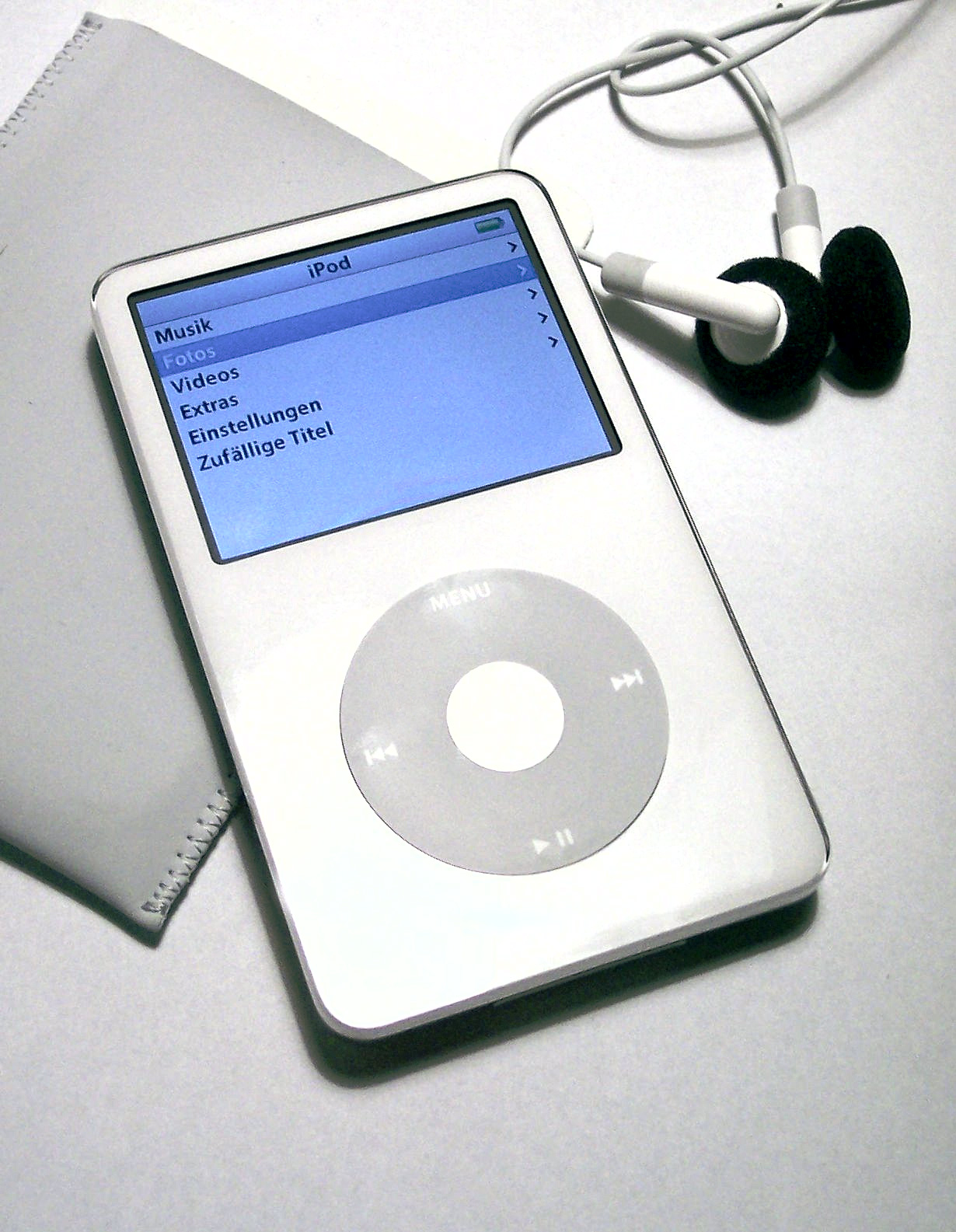
Sales of the album on the emerging iTunes Store were high. Pictured: an iPod in 2006.

By this time, the project's principal members had moved on to other projects, and their newfound mainstream success came as a surprise. For the music industry, its success was also unexpected; Paoletta viewed it one of "2004's biggest surprises." Kiewel was initially convinced the album could sell between 10,000 and 20,000 copies, though Tamborello "scoffed" at the idea. It became Sub Pop's second biggest-selling album in their history, second only to Nirvana's Bleach, which was released in 1989. The RIAA certified Give Up gold in February 2005; that month, the band released a third and final single from the LP, "We Will Become Silhouettes", backed with a new song, "Be Still My Heart". The single charted best in Canada, where as a double A-side single the songs reached number seven on the national charts. Domestically, it was a mild crossover hit, peaking at number 82 on the Billboard Hot 100 in early 2005. Sub Pop tapped Napoleon Dynamite director Jared Hess to helm the song's music video. Both clips for Give Up attracted rotation on the Fuse network and MTV2's Subterranean.

Over a decade past its release, the RIAA certified the album platinum in the U.S., indicating over one million copies sold. Chris Payne of Billboard considered this "a testament to its ongoing popularity and influence." The tenth anniversary reissue of the album reached a new peak of number 45 on the Billboard 200 in April 2013. As of that year, Give Up had sold over 1.1 million units in the United States.

== Critical reception ==
Professional ratings
Aggregate scores
| Source | Rating |
|---|---|
| Metacritic | 79/100 |
Review scores
| Source | Rating |
| AllMusic | 5/5 stars |
| Alternative Press | 4/5 |
| Billboard | 4.5/5 stars |
| Entertainment Weekly | A− |
| Mojo | 4/5 stars |
| NME | 8/10 |
| Pitchfork | 8.0/10 |
| Q | 4/5 stars |
| Rolling Stone | 3/5 stars |
| The Village Voice | A− |

Give Up was generally well received by music critics. It holds a score of 79 out of 100 on review aggregate site Metacritic, indicating "generally favorable reviews". Will Hermes of Entertainment Weekly wrote that "Ben Gibbard radiates claustrophobia, so the shut-in synth-pop of this side project fits him like a leotard", calling Give Up "the near-perfect pop record that's eluded his main group." The Village Voice's Robert Christgau praised the album's "staying power" and felt that "Gibbard's delicate voice matches the subtle electro arrangements far more precisely than it does the folky guitars of his real group".

Reviewing Give Up for AllMusic, Heather Phares opined that while the album does not measure up to either Gibbard or Tamborello's main projects, it is nonetheless "far more consistent and enjoyable than might be expected." Michaelangelo Matos of Rolling Stone described the album as "a cuddly little new wave reverie" and wrote that "Tamborello's delightful pings and whistles fit Gibbard's whimsy perfectly." Devon Powers of PopMatters remarked that "like any worthy match, the coming together gives each aspect assets that they'd be wont to find otherwise", concluding that the album "integrates the human and the humanoid to give soundtrack to the disconnected, yet earnest escapades of contemporary emotional life." Matt LeMay of Pitchfork called the album "a pretty damned strong record, and one with enough transcendent moments to forgive it its few substandard tracks and ungodly lyrical blunders".

Pitchfork placed Give Up at number 104 on its list of the 200 best albums of the 2000s. Rolling Stone ranked Give Up as the decade's 86th best album.

== Touring ==
The Postal Service—consisting of Gibbard, Tamborello, and Lewis—promoted the 2003 release of Give Up by touring that year. Nick Harmer, bassist of Death Cab for Cutie, joined the trio on the trek, managing the group and the visual accompaniment that was projected behind their performance. Rjyan Claybrook Kidwell, touring under the stage name Cex, was the opening act on the inaugural tour. All five musicians, plus their merchandise manager, toured in one van and slept in one motel room together. Gibbard looked back with humor on touring in such close quarters with people who were largely strangers to him. He acknowledged that with typical bands, touring could sometimes grow tiresome. Instead, he equated the band's initial tour to a honeymoon phase, noting that the six were largely having fun and drinking heavily.

Initially, their booking agent had trouble explaining the project to promoters; Gibbard noted that the only selling points were that it featured members of Death Cab and Rilo Kiley. Despite this, The Postal Service sold out half of the venues they first performed at. As the album grew in popularity, some venues had to be switched to larger rooms to accommodate more fans—the final Los Angeles date of the trek switched from a 300-seat room to a 1500-capacity. "You could really see physical proof of the album getting popular as we went across the country," Tamborello recalled. The Postal Service toured for five weeks in the U.S. throughout April–May 2003, and two overseas in Europe that June. "It was a really fun tour, and then we all went back to our day jobs. Things kind of got crazy after that," Gibbard recalled.

=== Tenth anniversary tour ===
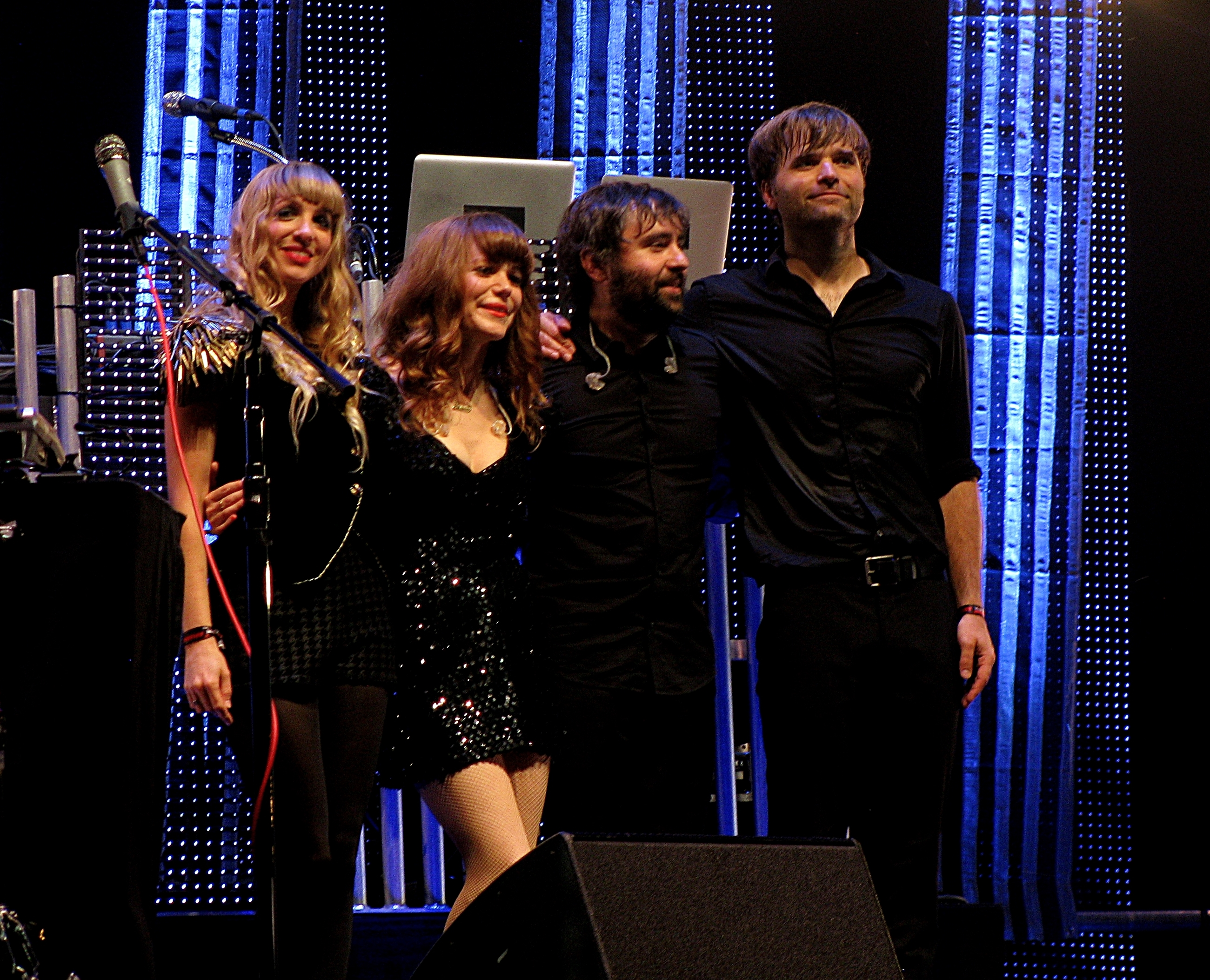
Laura Burhenn, Lewis, Tamborello, and Gibbard at Lollapalooza 2013.

In 2013, The Postal Service reunited in celebration of the album's tenth anniversary, performing to larger crowds at much bigger venues than a decade prior. Lewis joined the band for all of the dates, which also added Laura Burhenn from the Mynabirds on vocals and keyboards. The tour ran between April and August 2013 worldwide, upgrading from club capacity to arenas, such as New York's Barclays Center. The group also performed at several festivals, including Coachella and Sasquatch! stateside, and Primavera Sound in Spain. Tamborello noted in an interview that the original laptop he had employed in the album's making had over time failed, and he had to piece together the original stems from various external hard drive backups. The tour ended with an appearance at Lollapalooza in Chicago. Gibbard announced that the Lollapalooza after-show, performed at local club the Metro, would be the last Postal Service performance, formally ending the band's career.

The following year, the band released a feature-length documentary concert film titled Everything Will Change, filmed during a stop of the tour in Berkeley, California; a remixed live album of the same name was later issued in 2020. In addition, the Creators Project (a partnership between Intel and Vice) produced a 15-minute documentary on the tour and the album, titled Some Idealistic Future.

== Legacy ==
Give Up was released during a period in which independent music first began to garner mainstream interest. It has been considered "one of the touchstones of a new generation of indie music." It was suggested that its success was a reaction to more heavy or aggressive indie rock bands, such as the White Stripes or the Strokes. In addition to the younger indie fanbase, the album also connected with older listeners, who appreciated its synth-pop influences. New York Times editor Jon Pareles observed in 2013 that the album was influential on groups like Owl City and Passion Pit. Give Up represented Sub Pop's second biggest-selling album in its history, only behind Nirvana's Bleach (1989). The Postal Service eclipsed the Shins and Hot Hot Heat as the record label's most popular act in the early aughts. Gibbard has remarked that between Give Up and Death Cab's Transatlanticism, "I’ve never had a more creatively inspired year."

Though the album was by all accounts immensely successful, Give Up still stands as the Postal Service's only album. From its genesis, its creators intended it as a one-off experiment. Still, Gibbard and Tamborello continued to collaborate in the following years, this time sending their music to one another using the Internet. The duo completed two original songs in 2006—"Turn Around" and "A Tattered Line of String"—before determining the project should remain in the past. Both tracks, and the bulk of the rest of the band's recorded output, feature on a bonus disc of the tenth anniversary reissue of the album. As for the idea of another album in the future, both musicians have considered it unlikely. Gibbard has said that the Give Up captured something special: "It was just this moment that was very inspired and unique." Tamborello concurred: "[Give Up] came together in such a natural way that I feel like if it happens again, it has to feel like that, and maybe that's impossible."

== Track listing ==
All tracks are written by Benjamin Gibbard and Jimmy Tamborello.

| No. | Title | Length |
|---|---|---|
| 1. | "The District Sleeps Alone Tonight" | 4:44 |
| 2. | "Such Great Heights" | 4:26 |
| 3. | "Sleeping In" | 4:21 |
| 4. | "Nothing Better" (featuring Jen Wood) | 3:46 |
| 5. | "Recycled Air" | 4:29 |
| 6. | "Clark Gable" | 4:54 |
| 7. | "We Will Become Silhouettes" | 5:00 |
| 8. | "This Place Is a Prison" | 3:54 |
| 9. | "Brand New Colony" | 4:12 |
| 10. | "Natural Anthem" | 5:07 |
| Total length: | | 44:53 |

Note

- The vinyl version of Give Up was released on November 9, 2004, and featured a bonus 12" of B-sides, covers and remixes, all of which can also be found on the Such Great Heights and The District Sleeps Alone Tonight EPs:

Bonus vinyl disc
| No. | Title | Length |
|---|---|---|
| 1. | "There's Never Enough Time" |
| 2. | "We Will Become Silhouettes" (performed by The Shins) |
| 3. | "Such Great Heights" (performed by Iron & Wine) |
| 4. | "Suddenly Everything Has Changed" (The Flaming Lips cover) |
| 5. | "The District Sleeps Alone Tonight" (DJ Downfall Persistent Beat Mix) |
| 6. | "Such Great Heights" (John Tejada Remix) |
| 7. | "Nothing Better" (Styrofoam Remix) |

10th Anniversary Deluxe Edition
| No. | Title | Length |
|---|---|---|
| 1. | "The District Sleeps Alone Tonight" | 4:43 |
| 2. | "Such Great Heights" | 4:26 |
| 3. | "Sleeping In" | 4:21 |
| 4. | "Nothing Better" | 3:46 |
| 5. | "Recycled Air" | 4:29 |
| 6. | "Clark Gable" | 4:54 |
| 7. | "We Will Become Silhouettes" | 5:00 |
| 8. | "This Place Is a Prison" | 4:12 |
| 9. | "Brand New Colony" | 4:12 |
| 10. | "Natural Anthem" | 5:07 |
| 11. | "Turn Around" | 3:45 |
| 12. | "A Tattered Line of String" | 2:56 |
| 13. | "Be Still My Heart" | 3:03 |
| 14. | "There's Never Enough Time" | 3:32 |
| 15. | "Suddenly Everything Has Changed" (The Flaming Lips cover) | 3:26 |
| 16. | "Against All Odds (Take a Look at Me Now)" (Phil Collins cover) | 4:17 |
| 17. | "Grow Old with Me" (John Lennon cover) | 2:31 |
| 18. | "Such Great Heights" (John Tejada Remix) | 5:49 |
| 19. | "The District Sleeps Alone Tonight" (DJ Downfall Persistent Beat Mix) | 6:54 |
| 20. | "Be Still My Heart" (Nobody Remix) | 3:54 |
| 21. | "We Will Become Silhouettes" (Matthew Dear's Not Scared Remix) | 5:05 |
| 22. | "Nothing Better" (Styrofoam Remix) | 3:27 |
| 23. | "Recycled Air" (Live on KEXP) | 2:59 |
| 24. | "We Will Become Silhouettes" (performed by The Shins) | 3:01 |
| 25. | "Such Great Heights" (performed by Iron & Wine) | 4:16 |

== Personnel ==
- Benjamin Gibbard – lead vocals, guitars (1, 2, 3, 5, 9), additional keyboards (2, 7), electric piano (8), drums (6, 8, 9)
- Jimmy Tamborello – keyboards, synthesizers, programming, accordion (8), electric drums, production, glitching
- Jenny Lewis – backing vocals (1, 3, 5–7, 9)
- Chris Walla – piano (4)
- Jen Wood – backing vocals (2), vocals (4)

== Chart positions ==
=== Week-end charts ===
Weekly chart performance for Give Up in 2003
| Chart (2003) | Peak position |
|---|---|
| US Billboard 200 | 45 |
| US Top Dance Albums (Billboard) | 1 |
| US Heatseekers Albums (Billboard) | 1 |
| US Independent Albums (Billboard) | 3 |

Weekly chart performance for Give Up in 2013
| Chart (2013) | Peak position |
|---|---|
| US Billboard 200 | 45 |

=== Year-end charts ===
Year-end chart performance for Give Up
| Chart (2003) | Position |
|---|---|
| US Top Dance/Electronic Albums (Billboard) | 4 |

== Certifications ==
| Region | Certification | Certified units/sales |
|---|---|---|
| Canada (Music Canada) | Gold | 50,000^{^} |
| United Kingdom (BPI) | Silver | 60,000^{‡} |
| United States (RIAA) | Platinum | 1,000,000^{^} |
^{^} Shipments figures based on certification alone.^{‡} Sales+streaming figures based on certification alone.
