= Steve Brookstein =

English singer (born 1968)

- Born: Stephen Desmond Brookstein; 10 November 1968 (age 57); Dulwich, England
- Genres: Jazz; blue-eyed soul
- Occupation: Singer
- Years active: 1997–present
- Labels: Syco; Pledge
- Website: stevebrookstein.com

Stephen Desmond Brookstein (born 10 November 1968) is an English singer, who is best known for winning the first series of The X Factor in 2004.

== Early and personal life ==
Brookstein was born in Dulwich, London, England, the son of Malle, a council worker, and Errol Brookstein, a lorry driver. His father is South African and his mother is of Estonian descent. In 1997, seven years before his breakthrough on The X Factor, Brookstein was a finalist on the ITV series The Big Big Talent Show, hosted by Jonathan Ross.

== Career ==
=== 2004–2005: The X Factor and Heart and Soul ===
In early 2004, Brookstein auditioned for the first series of The X Factor, a talent series aiming to discover new recording artists in the UK. His audition failed to impress two of the judges, Sharon Osbourne and Louis Walsh, who thought he lacked the motivation and confidence to succeed but the third, Simon Cowell, asked Brookstein to return the following day and sing again. At the second audition, Brookstein managed to impress the other judges and was put through to the next stage of the competition. He reached the live shows, where contestants are put to the public vote, as one of three contestants in the Over 25s category mentored by Cowell. He reached the grand final on 11 December 2004 alongside G4 and won, despite him mixing up words and lines in his winner's song and a controversial outburst against him from Osbourne. However, according to Osbourne's subsequent autobiography, he had gained the most votes in every single one of the live shows. For five years, he held the record for the largest number of votes ever received in the final - 6 million, but this is now held by series 6 winner Joe McElderry, who received over 6.1 million votes.

After winning The X Factor, Brookstein was signed to the Sony BMG record label through which he released his first single, a cover of Phil Collins' 1984 power ballad "Against All Odds", on 20 December 2004. The song debuted on the UK Singles Chart at number two and then climbed to number one on 2 January 2005, going one better than Collins' original and staying there for one week. In Ireland, the song peaked at number 11. The music video for the song was a montage of clips from his time on The X Factor, from his initial audition to his final performance after being declared the winner.

Brookstein released his debut album Heart and Soul on 9 May 2005 through Sony BMG. Although Brookstein continued to perform tracks from the album on television shows such as CD:UK, a second single failed to materialise. In August 2005, it was announced that Sony BMG had dropped him from their line-up only eight months after his X Factor victory and despite the success of his debut single and album. Brookstein maintains that the decision to drop him reportedly came after he was offered a second album and to come back on the show, which he declined as it was to be another album of covers and he preferred a mix of old and new. In August 2005, eight months after being dropped from his record label, Brookstein publicly attacked The X Factor, claiming the show was "one big theatre... turning music into the WWE" and that it was "killing music". Brookstein has publicly feuded with Simon Cowell and The X Factor, claiming "there is absolutely no way he would want me within 100 miles of him" and admitting spending years feeling bitter about the way he was treated on the show.

Although Brookstein enjoyed fleeting success with both his debut album and single both reaching number one – "Heart and Soul" and "Against All Odds" respectively – he was dropped by Cowell's management after the latter was accused of refusing Brookstein creative freedom.

The X Factor performances and results (2004)
Show	Song choice	Result
Audition (Part 1)	"A Song for You" – Andy Williams	
Audition (Part 2)	"Part Time Love" – Gladys Knight & the Pips	Through to bootcamp part 1
Bootcamp (Part 1)	"Unknown"	Through to bootcamp part 2
Bootcamp (Part 2)	"That's Why" – Michael McDonald	Through to bootcamp part 3
Bootcamp (Part 3)	"Ain't No Mountain High Enough" – Marvin Gaye & Tammi Terrell	Through to bootcamp part 4
Bootcamp (Part 4)	"Dance with My Father" – Luther Vandross	Through to judges' houses
Judges' houses	No song	Through to live shows
Live show 1	"When a Man Loves a Woman" – Percy Sledge	1st
Live show 2	"If You Don't Know Me by Now" – Harold Melvin & the Blue Notes	1st
Live show 3	"Smile" – Nat King Cole	1st
Live show 4	"Help Me Make It Through the Night" – Kris Kristofferson	1st
Live show 5	"Let's Stay Together" – Al Green	1st
Quarter-Final	"I Get the Sweetest Feeling" – Jackie Wilson	1st
Quarter-Final	"If I Could Turn Back the Hands of Time" – R. Kelly	1st
Semi-Final	"Have I Told You Lately" – Van Morrison	1st
Semi-Final	"Greatest Love of All" – Whitney Houston	1st
Final	"(Your Love Keeps Lifting Me) Higher and Higher" – Jackie Wilson	Final
Final	"Smile" – Nat King Cole	Final
Final	"Against All Odds (Take a Look at Me Now)" – Phil Collins	Final

=== 2008–2010: Musicals and controversies ===
In June 2007, Brookstein appeared on the P&O Portsmouth to Bilbao car ferry, alongside The X Factor series 2 alumni Chico Slimani and Journey South. In 2008, he played 'the father' in a touring production of the musical Our House.

In December 2009, when a Facebook campaign was launched to stop The X Factor's winner from achieving the coveted Christmas number 1 spot, Brookstein backed the campaign to see Rage Against the Machine's "Killing in the Name" reach the top of the chart, targeting Cowell in an online rant. He further attacked Cowell, claiming the latter "ruined Christmas" and that he was dropped from his record label because he "wouldn't play the game". Brookstein also claimed the show was staged and the winner was fixed, and was subsequently removed from the official The X Factor website following those comments. Despite Brookstein's bitterness towards The X Factor, he signed up to critique the show weekly on London 24 in 2010, where he labelled the judges "ridiculous" and questioned the standards of several of the finalists, including One Direction band member Louis Tomlinson, and the vocal coach.

=== 2011–present: Musical hiatus and Forgotten Man ===
In 2013, Brookstein announced that his new album would be called Forgotten Man and would be released on 23 March 2014.

Brookstein released a book on 21 November 2014, Getting over the X, that describes his journey from winning The X Factor to having the press and industry turn their backs on him.

Since 2014, Brookstein has occasionally performed live including at Bowdonbury Festival in 2023 and in Morpeth in 2024.

== Discography ==
=== Albums ===
Title	Album details	Peak chart positions		Sales	certifications
Title	Album details	UK	IRE	Sales	certifications
Heart and Soul	Released: 9 May 2005; Label: Sony BMG; Format: CD	1	1	UK: 105,338	BPI: Gold
40,000 Things	Released: 9 October 2006; Label: Numunu Records; Format: CD, digital download	165	—		
Forgotten Man	Released: 23 March 2014; Label: Pledge Music; Format: CD, digital download	—	—		
"—" denotes album that did not chart or was not released.

=== Singles ===
Title	Year	Peak chart positions		Album
Title	Year	UK	IRE	Album
"Against All Odds"	2004	1	11	Heart and Soul
"Fighting Butterflies"	2006	193	—	40,000 Things
"Don't Give Up"	2010	—	—	Non-album single
"—" denotes single that did not chart or was not released.

== Music videos ==
Title	Year	Director(s)
"Against All Odds"	2004	Unknown
"Fighting Butterflies"	2006	Unknown

== Concert tours ==
- The X Factor Live Tour (2005)
- The 40,000 Things Tour (2006)
- The Great American Soul Book Tour (2007)

Preceded by N/A	Winner of The X Factor; 2004	Succeeded by Shayne Ward
