= Heart and Soul (Steve Brookstein album) =

Studio album by Steve Brookstein
- Released: 9 May 2005
- Recorded: 2004–2005
- Genre: Soul; jazz
- Label: Syco, Sony BMG

Steve Brookstein chronology
Heart and Soul (2005)	40,000 Things (2006)

Singles from Heart and Soul
- 1. "Against All Odds" Released: 20 December 2004

Professional ratings
Review scores
Source	Rating
AllMusic	link

Heart and Soul is the debut album from X Factor winner Steve Brookstein, released on 9 May 2005. It was released only several months after his X Factor win and therefore he opted to produce a record of cover songs of classic soul and jazz songs, including "If You Don't Know Me by Now" and his debut number-one single, "Against All Odds".

== Commercial performance ==
The album reached No. 1 on the UK Albums Chart in 2005 with first week sales of 50,989. The album has sold 105,338 copies in the UK as of November 2015.

== Track listing ==
No.	Title	Producer(s)	Length
1.	"Dance with My Father"	Steve Mac
2.	"How Can You Mend a Broken Heart"	Brian Rawling, Paul Meehan
3.	"Yah Mo B There"	Rawling, Graham Stack
4.	"If You Don't Know Me by Now"	Mac
5.	"We've Only Just Begun"	Rawling, Stack
6.	"Ooh Baby Baby"	Ian Levine, Clive Scott
7.	"(Your Love Keeps Lifting Me) Higher and Higher"	Nigel Wright
8.	"Help Me Make It Through the Night"	Mac
9.	"Against All Odds"	Mac
10.	"Hang On in There Baby"	Rawling, Meehan
11.	"I Don't Want to Talk About It"	Rawling, Meehan
12.	"Kiss and Say Goodbye"	Mac
13.	"Have I Told You Lately"	Wright
14.	"Until You Come Back to Me"	Livingstone Brown, Steve Brookstein
