= The Postal Service =

American indie pop band

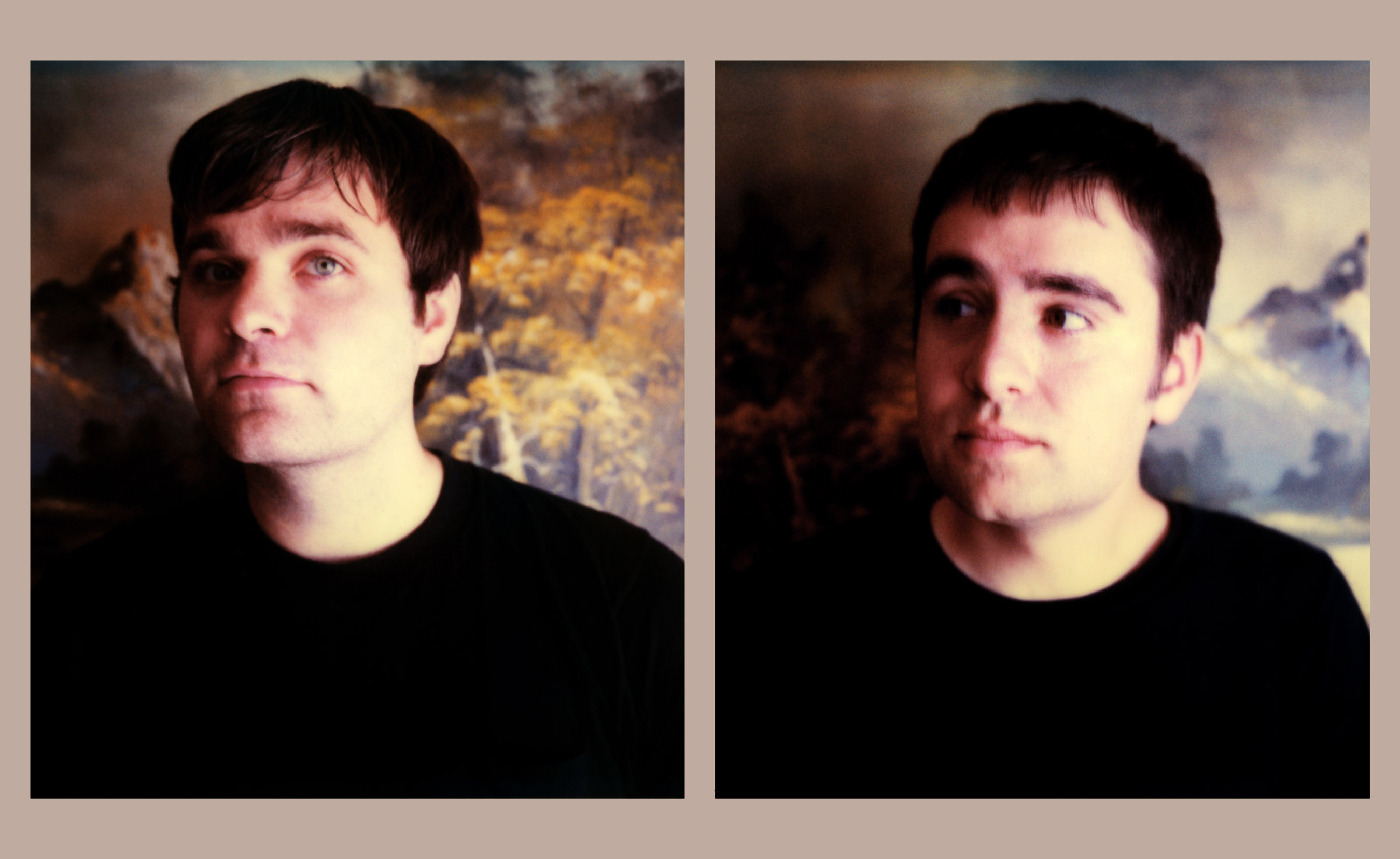
- Ben Gibbard (left) and Jimmy Tamborello

Background information
- Origin: Seattle, Washington, U.S.
- Genres: Indietronica; indie pop; synth-pop; emo-pop
- Years active: 2001–2006; 2013; 2023–2024
- Label: Sub Pop
- Spinoff of: Death Cab for Cutie
- Past members: Ben Gibbard; Jimmy Tamborello; Jenny Lewis
- Website: postalservicemusic.net

The Postal Service was an American indie pop supergroup from Seattle, Washington, consisting of singer Ben Gibbard, producer Jimmy Tamborello (also known by his stage name, Dntel), and Jenny Lewis on background vocals.

The band released their sole studio album, Give Up, in 2003 on Sub Pop Records, to mostly positive reviews. The album reached number 45 on the US Billboard 200 album chart and received platinum certification from the Recording Industry Association of America. The group decided to disband two years later, viewing attempts at a follow-up as unnecessary.

The band has regrouped twice for the anniversaries of Give Up, in both 2013 and 2023; each time they were accompanied by a rotating cast of support musicians, including Laura Burhenn, Jen Wood, Dave Depper and Jason McGerr.

The band announced that their last performance would be on September 21, 2024, at HFStival in Washington D.C.

== History ==
=== Formation (2001–2003) ===
The group formed after Ben Gibbard contributed vocals for a song by Jimmy Tamborello called "(This Is) The Dream of Evan and Chan", from the Dntel album Life Is Full of Possibilities. The song sparked an EP of remixes of other artists, including Lali Puna, The Flaming Lips, Safety Scissors, Barbara Morgenstern and Superpitcher, and was so well-received that the two artists decided to further collaborate. The third member of the band, Jenny Lewis, recorded vocals for several tracks before eventually becoming a full-fledged member of the band, sharing vocals and instrumentation in their live shows. The group were influenced by acts such as Orchestral Manoeuvres in the Dark, Depeche Mode and the Human League.

The band's name was chosen due to how it produced its songs. Due to conflicting schedules, Tamborello wrote and performed instrumental tracks and then sent the DATs through the mail to Gibbard, who then edited the song as he saw fit (adding his vocals along the way) and sent them back to Tamborello. Ironically, despite the final name they chose for the project, they did not use the United States Postal Service as a courier; the CDs were sent through either FedEx or the United Parcel Service.

=== Give Up (2003–2007) ===
The band's debut album, Give Up, was released on February 19, 2003, on Sub Pop Records. Several songs on the album feature guest vocals from Lewis, as well as vocals from indie rock musician Jen Wood. Additionally, Gibbard's Death Cab for Cutie bandmate Chris Walla played the guitar and piano on several tracks. Although both Gibbard and Tamborello's main projects were still active at the time, The Postal Service supported the album with a successful concert tour and stated its intention to tour again in the future.

Give Up received gold certification by the Recording Industry Association of America in March 2005, and later receiving platinum certification in October 2012. The album was Sub Pop's most successful release since Nirvana's debut album, Bleach.

The album produced three singles, the most well-known single being "Such Great Heights", which was released as Give Up's lead single. The song featured in advertisements for UPS, Kaiser Permanente, and M&M's, as well as being the first theme song for ABC's Grey's Anatomy in 2005. A cover of the song by Iron & Wine was featured on the soundtrack for the 2004 film Garden State. It was also later covered by Amanda Palmer, Ben Folds, The Scene Aesthetic, Brack Cantrell, Streetlight Manifesto, Confide, Gareth Pearson, Joy Kills Sorrow and Postmodern Jukebox. Confide would later release a music video for their cover of "Such Great Heights". The second single, "The District Sleeps Alone Tonight", was featured in the soundtrack of the 2004 film D.E.B.S. and later covered by British singer-songwriter Frank Turner. The third and final single, "We Will Become Silhouettes", was covered by The Shins, and the original version was featured in the trailer for the movie Funny People.

==== United States Postal Service controversy ====
In August 2003 the United States Postal Service (USPS) served the band with a cease and desist letter, citing the band's name as tarnishment and dilution of their trademark on the phrase "postal service". The band initially considered renaming themselves. Gibbard instead traveled to Los Angeles and met with representatives for the agency to negotiate and come to a consensus. In the end the duo inked a licensing agreement with the agency; the deal specified that the duo could continue to use the name if it agreed to promote the actual U.S. Postal Service and perform at its annual National Executive Conference in Washington, D.C., in November 2004. The band's CDs were then sold on the USPS's official website with the music being used in their advertisements. Tamborello, in an interview with Pitchfork, said the affair seemed "depressing" at first but ended up "kind of fun". They performed only two songs and briefly met with the Postmaster General. Tamborello noted that "Everyone was sort of in on the joke." In 2007 the instrumental of "Such Great Heights" appeared in the background of the "whiteboard" advertising campaign for one of the federal establishment's private competitors, the United Parcel Service.

==== Apple controversy ====
In 2006 the duo courted further publicity when they shared their discomfort with an Apple commercial, advertising a partnership with Intel, that shared similarities with the "Such Great Heights" music video. The two both share imagery of "space-suited scientists working in a sterile, futuristic laboratory." Both the TV spot and music video were helmed by the directorial team of Josh Melnick and Xander Charity, who were approached by Apple to re-create the video. All parties failed to inform Gibbard, Tamborello, or Sub Pop until just one day before it began airing. Gibbard shared a statement on the duo's official site, calling it a "shot-for-shot re-creation" and claiming disappointment that it "was executed without our consultation or consent." Apple later promoted the "Such Great Heights" clip on the main page of the iTunes Music Store, prompting it to become the most downloaded video on the site for a time, ahead of videos by Eminem, Jessica Simpson, and The Black Eyed Peas.

=== Possible second album (2007–2012) ===
On June 22, 2007, it was revealed that The Postal Service had begun work on a new album, though the specifics of the production and the release date were vague. Gibbard stated, "We're slowly starting. We're crawling right now, and whether that crawl turns into a walk remains to be seen. But we'll know more towards the end of the year. I've just been touring so much and trying to find time to make it happen and make our schedules line up." Tamborello added, "We're talking about wanting to finish an album by sometime next year, because we have to work with Death Cab's schedule and stuff. I definitely want to do another one."

On February 29, 2008, Spinner released an article stating that The Postal Service might not release a new album. Ben Gibbard stated, "Jimmy and I are still throwing ideas back and forth, but as time goes on, we find ourselves busy with our own music. ... We have some stuff, but it's been difficult to find the time and the drive to do the record. I'd love to finish it at some point and maybe even do some performances. If it's meant to be, it's meant to be." In May 2008, Gibbard stated that he and Tamborello were unlikely to release another album "before the end of the decade."

In a December 2008 interview with Rolling Stone, Gibbard laughed off suggestions that The Postal Service's long overdue follow-up to their 2003 hit Give Up would be an indie version of the Guns N' Roses album Chinese Democracy, which took 15 years to produce and release. Gibbard said that both he and Tamborello simply do not see it as a priority in light of their main projects, Death Cab for Cutie and Dntel, respectively. He said, "The anticipation of the second record has been a far bigger deal for everybody except the two of us... I don't know about it being the indie-rock Chinese Democracy, but now that Chinese Democracy has come out, I guess it just becomes the second Postal Service record that will never come out. There never really was a plan to do a second album. We work from time to time together but we have other things that take up all of our time."

In November 2012, Ben Gibbard posted on his Twitter account that there are "no plans" to produce another Postal Service record, and did not cite any specific reason for this statement, other than the fact that multiple fans questioned if there was going to be a second album.

On a 2025 episode of the Bandsplain podcast, Ben Gibbard stated (perhaps in jest) that he would make a second Postal Service album if English rock band The La's themselves ever released a second album.

=== Reunion, Give Up re-issue, and disbandment (2013–2014) ===
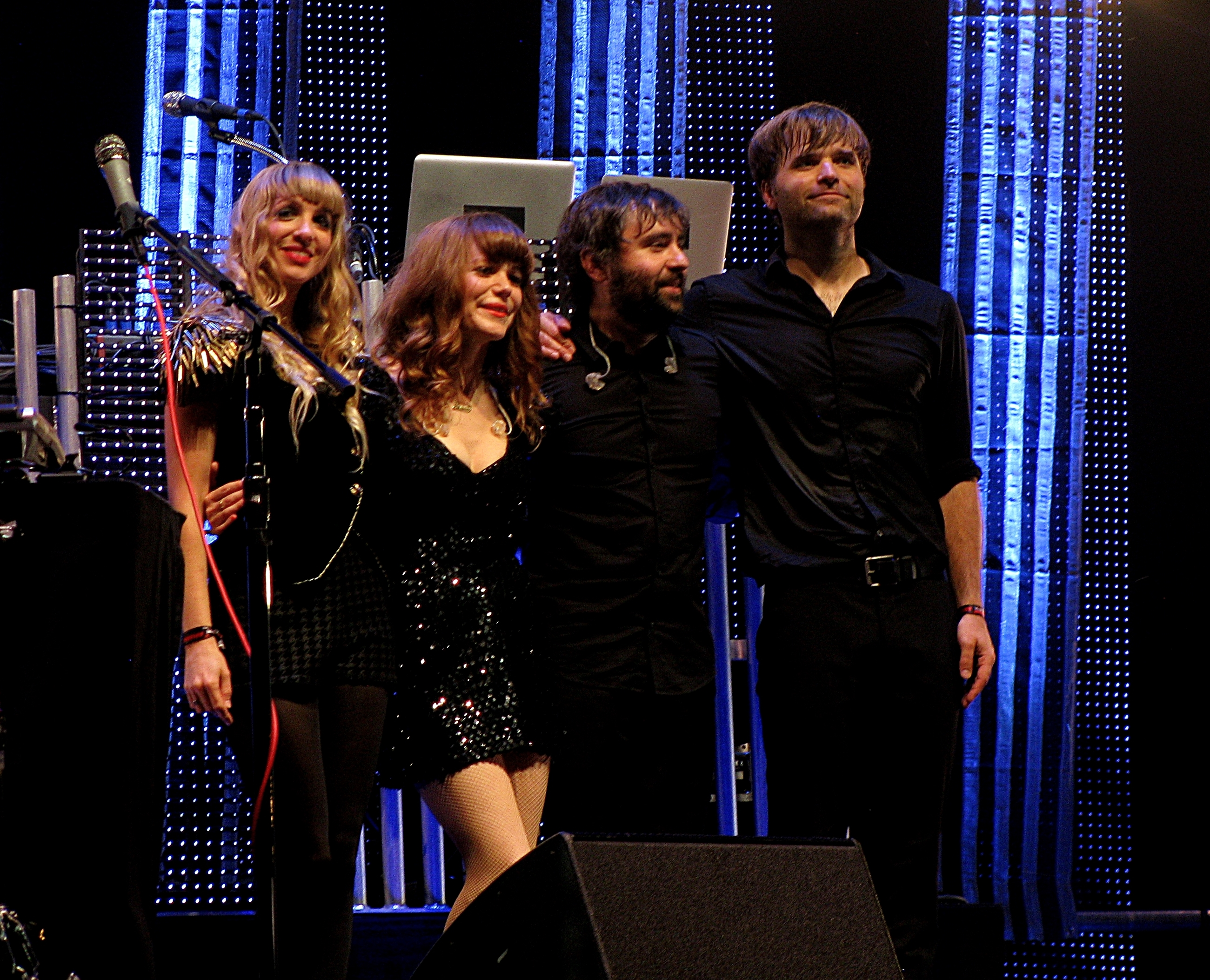
The Postal Service at a reunion show during Lollapalooza, Chicago on August 3, 2013

In January 2013, The Postal Service updated its website to read "The Postal Service 2013", reigniting speculation that the band would play shows, or possibly release a new album. It was later confirmed that the image on the band's site portended that the band's debut, Give Up, would receive a 10th-anniversary re-issue featuring a 15-song disc of rarities, including two new songs with Jenny Lewis to be released on April 9, 2013. The following month, The Postal Service announced it would officially reunite for an extended world tour with venues including Red Rocks Amphitheatre, the 2013 Coachella Valley Music and Arts Festival in April, Sasquatch! Music Festival in Washington in May, the Primavera Sound Festival 2013 in Barcelona, and Free Press Summer Fest in Houston, Texas in June.

Along with the reunion, the band released their first new track in ten years called "A Tattered Line of String" featuring Jenny Lewis. On March 21, the band released a second new track titled "Turn Around", released through 107.7 The End.

As a tie-in to the Give Up reissue, comedy website Funny or Die posted a parody video directed by Tom Scharpling set in 2002 titled "The Postal Service Auditions", in which Jimmy Tamborello holds auditions for his musical collaborator. Guest stars on the video include "Weird Al" Yankovic, Moby, Duff McKagan, Tom DeLonge, Aimee Mann, Jon Wurster, Page Hamilton, Nate Mendel, and Marc Maron.

On August 3, 2013, Ben Gibbard announced on Twitter that the Lollapalooza after-show would be the last Postal Service performance ever, and that the band would formally disband permanently after the show, finally quashing rumors of a highly anticipated second album. The band played their last live show at the Metro Chicago on August 5, 2013.

=== Subsequent collaborations, releases and Everything Will Change (2014–2022) ===
As an end punctuation mark to their career, The Postal Service released the feature-length documentary concert film Everything Will Change on October 7, 2014, filmed during their two performances at the Greek Theater in Berkeley, CA, July 26–27, 2013. Directed by Justin Mitchell, the film intersperses backstage tapes and interviews with complete footage of the concert itself.

Jimmy Tamborello produced a remix of Death Cab for Cutie's 2018 song "Summer Years".

Jenny Lewis toured with Death Cab for Cutie in the summer of 2019, in support of their On the Line and Thank You for Today albums, respectively. On select dates Gibbard invited Lewis to join DCFC for their set's encore, and DCFC played "Nothing Better" with Gibbard and Lewis recreating the vocals from the original song.

On October 6, 2020, The Postal Service created new social media accounts for the band and teased an announcement for the following day, sparking speculation about new music. The announcement was a mock video conference featuring Gibbard, Tamborello, and Lewis along with several musicians and celebrities urging people in the United States to vote in the November election, done in the style of 2013's "The Postal Service Auditions".

On December 4, 2020, The Postal Service released the live album Everything Will Change via Sub Pop Records, featuring the complete live recordings from the documentary/concert film of the same name that was released in 2014, remastered and available in audio format for the first time. Live tracks "Natural Anthem" and "The District Sleeps Alone Tonight" from the album were released as digital singles on November 22, 2020.

=== Give Up 20th Anniversary Tour (2023–2024) ===
In late summer 2023 The Postal Service reunited again for a co-headlining anniversary tour with Death Cab for Cutie. The Postal Service performed Give Up in its entirety, and Death Cab for Cutie performed Transatlanticism in its entirety in celebration of the 20th anniversaries of both albums. The tour originally consisted of 17 shows. However, due to high demand many more shows were added, with the tour extending into September 2024. Give Up was played in full at each show, followed by an encore of "Such Great Heights" on acoustic guitar and a cover of "Enjoy the Silence" by Depeche Mode.

In August 2024, ahead of the band's UK and European leg of the tour, Gibbard reflected on whether there could be a second The Postal Service album, noting: "I think the main reason that a second Postal Service record has never come to fruition – and will never come to fruition – the time commitments that Death Cab ended up taking, which really started with Transatlanticism, haven’t really ever let up. There’s just not enough time, let alone creative juices flowing, to make a suitable follow-up [to Give Up]. I think anything that we would attempt to make at this point would be thoroughly disappointing. The stakes are just lower [in Death Cab] when you’re putting an album out every two to three years. If people don’t like this one, there’ll be another one later. But after 20 years, there is no way we could ever follow that up in a way that would be satisfying to people. I would rather have all my focus on Death Cab than be watering both projects down. I just don’t have the capacity to do both. Some might argue I barely have the capacity to do one!"

On 7 February 2025, The Postal Service released a live recording of their cover of "Enjoy the Silence" from the 2023-2024 reunion tour, on the benefit charity compilation Good Music to Lift Los Angeles. The compilation was available for 24 hours only, and benefited various Los Angeles-area charities in the wake of the January 2025 Southern California wildfires.

== Members ==
- Benjamin Gibbard – lead vocals, guitar, bass, keyboards, drums (2001–2005, 2013, 2023–2024)
- Jimmy Tamborello – production, keyboards, electronic percussion, programming, accordion (2001–2005, 2013, 2023–2024)
- Jenny Lewis – backing and lead vocals, keyboards, guitar, sampling (2002–2005, 2013, 2023–2024)

=== Touring musicians ===
- Laura Burhenn – keyboards, backing vocals (2013)
- Dave Depper – keyboards, backing vocals (2023–2024)
- Jason McGerr – drums (2023–2024 - "Brand New Colony" and "Natural Anthem")

== Discography ==
=== Studio albums ===
List of studio albums, with selected chart positions, sales figures, and certifications
Title	Details	Peak chart positions					Sales	Certifications
Title	Details	US	US Dance	US Indie	UK	UK Indie	Sales	Certifications
Give Up	Released: February 19, 2003 (US); Label: Sub Pop; Formats: CD, LP, digital download	45	1	3	180	34	US: 1,094,000	RIAA: Platinum; BPI: Silver

=== Live albums ===
List of live albums
Title	Album details	Peak chart positions	
Title	Album details	UK Rec.	UK Indie Brk.
Everything Will Change	Released: November 14, 2014 (US - video formats), December 4, 2020 (audio formats); Label: Sub Pop; Format: CD+DVD-V, digital download, streaming	37	16

=== Singles ===
List of singles, with selected chart positions and certifications, showing the year released and album name
Title	Year	Peak chart positions								Certifications	Album
Title	Year	US	US Alt.	US Dance	US Rock	CAN	MEX Air.	UK	UK Indie	Certifications	Album
"Such Great Heights"	2003	— (Note: "Such Great Heights" did not enter the Billboard Hot 100, but peaked at number 21 on the Hot Singles Sales chart.)	—	—	—	—	—	—	—	RIAA: Platinum	Give Up
"The District Sleeps Alone Tonight"	2003	—	—	— (Note: "The District Sleeps Alone Tonight" did not enter the Dance/Electronic Songs chart, but peaked at number 3 on the Hot Dance Singles Sales chart.)	—	—	—	—	—	RIAA: Gold	Give Up
"Against All Odds"	2004	—	—	—	—	—	—	—	—		Wicker Park soundtrack
"We Will Become Silhouettes"	2005	82	—	— (Note: "We Will Become Silhouettes" did not enter the Dance/Electronic Songs chart, but peaked at number 1 on the Dance Singles Sales chart.)	—	7 (Note: "We Will Become Silhouettes" and "Be Still My Heart" charted as a double A-side single in Canada.)	—	92	26		Give Up
"Be Still My Heart"	2005	— (Note: "Be Still My Heart" did not enter the Billboard Hot 100, but peaked at number 9 on the Bubbling Under Hot 100 Singles chart, which acts as a 25-song extension to the Hot 100.)	—	—	—	7	—	—	—		Give Up
"Turn Around"	2013	—	—	—	—	—	—	—	—		Non-album singles
"A Tattered Line of String"	2013	—	28	19	41	—	35	—	—		Non-album singles
"—" denotes a recording that did not chart or was not released in that territory.

=== Other appearances ===
List of non-single guest appearances, showing the year released and album name
Title	Year	Album
"Recycled Air" (live radio version)	2005	Yeti Three
"Grow Old with Me"	2007	Instant Karma: The Amnesty International Campaign to Save Darfur

=== Music videos ===
- "A Tattered Line of String"
- "The District Sleeps Alone Tonight"
- "Such Great Heights"
- "We Will Become Silhouettes"

=== Remix work ===
List of remixes by The Postal Service for other artists, showing the year released and album name
Title	Year	Other artist(s)	Album
"Do You Realize??" (The Postal Service Remix)	2003	The Flaming Lips	Ego Tripping at the Gates of Hell
"New Resolution" (TPS Mix)	2004	Azure Ray	"New Resolution" single
"Little Girl Blue" (The Postal Service Remix)	2005	Nina Simone	Verve Remixed 3
"Mushaboom" (Postal Service Remix)	2006	Feist	Open Season
"I'm Free" (Postal Service Remix)	2006	The Rolling Stones	"I'm Free" single
"I'm a Realist" (The Postal Service Remix)	2008	The Cribs	I'm a Realist
