= Kozyndan =

Shared pseudonym of Kozue and Dan Kitchens

Kozyndan is the joint pseudonym of Los Angeles–based husband-and-wife illustrator team Kozue and Dan Kitchens, known in particular for their whimsical and occasionally absurd illustrations of modern cityscapes.

== Education and background ==
The pair met while majoring in illustration at California State University, Fullerton. Since then, their projects have included CD covers for bands such as Weezer, The Books, and The Postal Service, clothing (including lines of illustrated shoes), and posters for companies such as Nike, Inc.

Kozyndan care deeply about the topic of wildlife conservation.

== Video game work ==
The team has created conceptual designs for American McGee's video game Bad Day L.A.. Other video game work includes the cover design for The Urbz: Sims in the City and artwork using characters from Katamari Damacy.

== Australia ==
In the spring of 2011, Kozyndan toured Australia, with exhibitions in Perth, Melbourne, and Sydney. A portion of the proceeds went to benefit the Japanese earthquake relief fund.

== On-air ==
The pair has done radio shows at Dublab.
