= Rilo Kiley discography =

Band discography

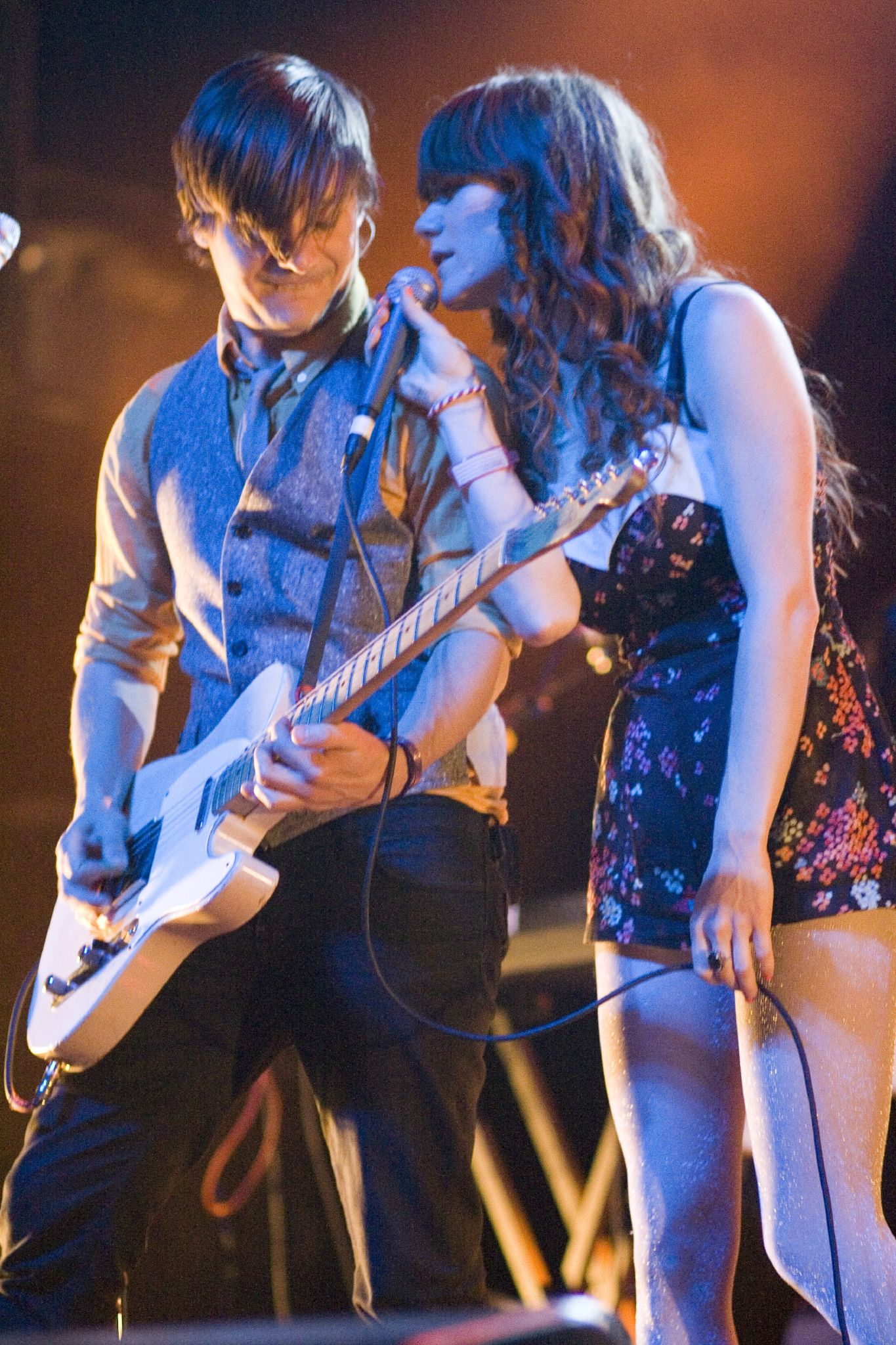
- Rilo Kiley performing in 2008
- Studio albums: 4
- Extended plays: 5
- Soundtrack albums: 1
- Compilation albums: 2
- Singles: 12
- Music videos: 10

This is a comprehensive listing of official releases by Los Angeles-based indie rock band Rilo Kiley.

== Albums ==
=== Studio albums ===
Title	Album	Chart positions							Sales
Title	Album	US	US Rock	US Alt.	US Dig.	US Heat	US Tm.	UK	Sales
Take Offs and Landings	Released: July 31, 2001; Label: Barsuk; Format: CD, LP, digital download	—	—	—	—	—	—	—	US: 66,000
The Execution of All Things	Released: October 1, 2002; Label: Saddle Creek; Format: CD, LP, digital download	—	—	—	—	—	—	—	US: 66,000
More Adventurous	Released: August 17, 2004; Label: Brute/Beaute, Warner Bros.; Format: CD, LP, digital download	161	—	—	—	7	—	116	US: 173,000
Under the Blacklight	Released: August 21, 2007; Label: Warner Bros.; Format: CD, LP, digital download	22	6	5	7	—	3	34	US: 186,000

=== Compilation albums ===
Title	Details	Chart positions				
Title	Details	US	US Rock	US Alt.	US Ind.	US Tm.
Rkives	Released: April 2, 2013; Label: Little Record Company; Format: 2×LP, CD, digital download, streaming, ltd. ed. 2×LP+CD+DD+Cassette EP	79	28	18	19	18
That’s How We Choose To Remember It	Released: May 9, 2025; Label: Saddle Creek; Format: LP, CD, cassette	-	-	-	-	-

== EPs ==
Year	Album	Label	Notes
1998	Sandbox Sessions	n/a	Demo tape circulated in 1998
1999	Rilo Kiley/The Initial Friend	Rilo Records/Little Record Company	Re-pressed in 2000, 2001 and 2020
2004	Live at Fingerprints	Brute/Beaute Records	Limited edition
2008	Breakin’ Up	Warner Bros. Records	Album version plus 2 remixes and Silver Lining remix
2013	Untitled Rkives Bonus Cassette	Little Record Company	Exclusive unreleased demo tracks available only on that format

== Singles ==
Year	Title	Album	B-Sides
2001	"Science vs. Romance"	Take Offs and Landings	"About the Moon"
2002	"After Hours"	Non-album track	split 7-inch w/ Bright Eyes & Sorry About Dresden
2003	"The Execution of All Things"	The Execution of All Things	"After Hours" & "Emotional (Until the Crickets Guide You Back)"
2004	"Portions for Foxes"	More Adventurous	"A Town Called Luckey" & "American Wife"
2005	"It's a Hit"	More Adventurous	"Patiently"
2005	"I Never"	More Adventurous	"American Wife"
2007	"The Moneymaker"	Under the Blacklight	"Big Break" & "Draggin' Around"
2007	"Silver Lining" (#30 AAA chart)	Under the Blacklight	
2008	"Breakin' Up"	Under the Blacklight	"Breakin' Up" (Hot Chip Remix)
2013	"Let Me Back In"	Rkives	
2013	"Runnin' Around"	Rkives	
2025	"Jenny, You’re Barely Alive"	Saddle Creek 50	"Emotional (Until the Crickets Guide You Back)" & "After Hours (The Velvet Underground cover)"

== Music videos ==
Year	Title	Director
1999	"The Frug"	Morgan J. Freeman
2001 (unreleased); 2007 (released)	"Wires and Waves"	Morgan J. Freeman
2001	"Bulletproof"	Liam Lynch
2004	"Portions for Foxes"	Brian Lazzaro
2005	"It's a Hit"	Andrew Bruntel, Matt Enlow
2007	"The Moneymaker"	Autumn de Wilde
2007	"The Moneymaker (Full Version)"	Autumn de Wilde
2007	"Silver Lining"	Autumn de Wilde
2013	"Let Me Back In"	Rilo Kiley
2013	"Emotional"	Austin Nagler

== Compilation appearances ==
Year	Title	Compilation
1999	"The Frug"	Desert Blue OST
1999	"85"	Desert Blue OST
2002	"Pictures of Success"	Barsuk Records Treats
2003	"With Arms Outstretched"	Saddle Creek 50
2003	"Jenny, You're Barely Alive"	Saddle Creek 50
2003	"Xmas Cake"	Maybe This Christmas Too?
2005	"More Adventurous"	Wedding Crashers OST
2005	"Portions for Foxes"	Grey's Anatomy Original Soundtrack, Vol. 1
2005	"I Never"	Must Love Dogs OST
2005	"Do They Know It's Hallowe'en?"	North American Hallowe'en Prevention Initiative
2006	"Ripchord"	Conversations with Other Women OST

== See also ==
- Jenny Lewis
- Jenny Lewis discography
- Blake Sennett
- The Elected
- The Postal Service
- Night Terrors of 1927
- Broken Social Scene
