= Frug (dance) =

Type of dance

The frug (/frʌɡ/ or /fruːg/) was a dance craze from the mid-1960s, which included vigorous dance to pop music. It evolved from another dance of the era, the chicken. The chicken, which featured lateral body movements, was used primarily as a change of pace step while doing the twist. As young dancers grew tired they would move less, moving only their hips while standing in place. They then started making up arm movements for the dance, which prompted the birth of the Swim, the Monkey, the Dog, the Watusi, the Mashed Potato, and the Jerk. The Frug is sometimes referred to as the Surf, Big Bea, and the Thunderbird.

== In popular culture ==
In The Andy Griffith Show episode "The Senior Play" (Season 7, Episode 9) the principal of the high school is appalled by a demonstration of the Frug dance and insists it must not be included in the senior play. But with the help of Helen Crump (who demonstrates the Jitterbug from her generation) and the kids demonstrating the Charleston from the principal's generation, he sees that the then contemporary dancing of young people is not much different from previous generations.

The movie Sweet Charity (1969) contains a number called "The Rich Man's Frug", a wildly energetic dance number comprising three "movements" ("The Aloof", "The Heavyweight" and "The Big Finish") that showcases director Bob Fosse's distinctive choreography style, particularly his creative use of unusual poses, gestures, and arm movements. The evolution of Frug also signified maturation of theatricality in Fosse's choreography, departing regimentation towards visual dissonance, where every dancer could perform their own moves.

In In the Red Light: A History of the Republican Convention in 1964, published in the November 1964 issue of Esquire, Norman Mailer wrote: "The American mind had gone from Hawthorne and Emerson to the Frug, the Bounce, and 'Walking the Dog', from The Flowering of New England to the cerebrality of professional football in which a quarterback must have not only heart, courage, strength and grace but a mind like an I.B.M. computer." The piece is collected in Mailer's Cannibals and Christians (1966).

In “Rock Lobster” by the US rock band The B52s, one verse includes, “Everybody's rockin' / Everybody's fruging”.

Indie rock band Rilo Kiley have a song titled "Frug" (also about the dance) on their 1999 self-titled debut, The Initial Friend EP, and was also the band's first music video. "Frug" was also included in the soundtrack to the Christina Ricci film Desert Blue, which led to the band's heightened popularity and eventual signing to a record label. "Frug" was later included as the final song on the band's B-sides and rarities compilation, Rkives.

== See also ==
- 1960s in music
- Social dance
- Jazz dance
- List of dance styles
