= Rkives =

Compilation album by Rilo Kiley
- Released: April 2, 2013
- Genre: Indie rock, alt country, folk, indie pop
- Length: 77:51
- Language: English
- Label: Little Record Company

Rilo Kiley chronology
Under the Blacklight (2007)	Rkives (2013)

Singles from Rkives
- 1. "Let Me Back In" Released: March 19, 2013; 2. "Runnin' Around" Released: May 6, 2013

Rkives (stylized as rkives, pronounced "archives") is a compilation album released in 2013 by Los Angeles–based band Rilo Kiley.

== Album history ==
Following the 2010 announcement of the band's hiatus, drummer Jason Boesel discussed plans for a compilation album, intended for release that year. In 2012, it was confirmed by Pitchfork Media that the B-sides release was nearly finished. The release date for the album was eventually announced as April 2, 2013.

In an interview with BuzzFeed, Rilo Kiley frontwoman Jenny Lewis described the songs that went into the album.

"Every record that I’ve ever been a part of, there are always leftovers—things that don’t work as a part of the whole thing," Lewis says. "Some songs, which may actually be better songs in the long run, get kind of kicked to the side in the process. We scoured our digital hard drives and old 8-track cassette tapes and made this record."

The band reached out to fans for help making a video for "Let Me Back In", inviting fans "to upload your favorite personal Rilo Kiley video clip, band footage, created animation, etc... whatever you have in moving pictures that you'd like to share with us." The video was released via Pitchfork Media on February 19, 2013.

== Reception ==
Professional ratings
Aggregate scores
Source	Rating
Metacritic	72/100
Review scores
Source	Rating
AllMusic	3/5 stars
The A.V. Club	B+
Drowned in Sound	8/10
Mojo	4/5 stars
MSN Music (Expert Witness)	A
Pitchfork	7.4/10
Q	3/5 stars
Rolling Stone	3.5/5 stars
Spin	8/10
Uncut	6/10

Spin Magazine gave the compilation an 8 out of 10, saying that "Rkives is not the sorely nonexistent sixth Rilo Kiley album, unfortunately, but as a career-spanning loose-ends wrap-up, it's sure a lot better than the next best thing". Rolling Stone called it a "mostly filler-free set of outtakes, demos and b-sides", and The A.V. Club said that while the album "begins and ends as a “fans only" endeavor [...] the compilation provides an essential supplement to the Rilo Kiley discography".

== Songs ==
Some of the tracks were used as B-sides to previous singles throughout the band's career, while others are previously unreleased.

Tracks 1–4 and 7–9 were recorded during the Under the Blacklight sessions in 2007. Track 7 appeared as a B-side on the single for "The Moneymaker".

Tracks 5 and 6 were recorded in Lincoln, Nebraska for an unreleased EP.

Tracks 10, 12 and 13 were recorded during the sessions for More Adventurous. Tracks 10 and 12 were available on the "Portions For Foxes" single. Track 13 is the b-side of the “It’s a Hit” single.

Track 11 is a B-side from the band's 2002 album The Execution of All Things. It was previously available on the single for "The Execution of All Things" (under the title "Emotional (Until Crickets Guide You Back)").

Tracks 14 and 15 were recorded at lead guitarist Blake Sennett's house in Echo Park. Track 14 is a demo version of "Rest of My Life", a song from the band's 2001 record Take Offs and Landings.

Track 16 is from The Initial Friend E.P., Rilo Kiley's out-of-print first release. It appeared on the soundtrack for the 1998 film Desert Blue.

== Track listing ==
No.	Title	Writer(s)	Producer(s)	Length
1.	"Let Me Back In"	Jenny Lewis, Blake Sennett	Rilo Kiley, Jason Lader	4:23
2.	"It'll Get You There"	Lewis	Rilo Kiley, Jason Lader	5:02
3.	"Runnin' Around"	Lewis	Rilo Kiley, Jason Lader	2:56
4.	"All the Drugs"	Lewis	Rilo Kiley, Jason Lader	3:45
5.	"Bury, Bury, Bury Another"	Lewis	Mike Mogis	3:29
6.	"Well, You Left"	Sennett	Mike Mogis	6:17
7.	"Draggin' Around"	Lewis	Rilo Kiley, Jason Lader	3:24
8.	"I Remember You (feat. Benji Hughes)"	Lewis, Sennett, Hughes	Rilo Kiley, Jason Lader	4:16
9.	"Dejalo (Zondo Remix feat. Too $hort)"	Lewis, Johnathan Rice, Too $hort	Rilo Kiley	3:35
10.	"A Town Called Luckey (feat. Tim Kasher)"	Lewis, Sennett	Mike Mogis	6:43
11.	"Emotional"	Lewis, Sennett, Pierre De Reeder	Mike Mogis	3:52
12.	"American Wife"	Lewis	Mike Mogis	4:36
13.	"Patiently"	Lewis, Sennett	Mike Mogis	3:08
14.	"Rest of My Life (Demo)"	Sennett	Rilo Kiley	3:52
15.	"About the Moon (feat. The Watson Twins)"	Lewis, Sennett	Rilo Kiley	3:09
16.	"The Frug"	Lewis, Sennett	Sandbox	2:40

- There are two separate hidden tracks not listed in the liner notes. They begin after several minutes of silence. The one on the CD is sung by Jenny Lewis and the one on the LP is sung by Blake Sennett.

=== Deluxe Edition ===
A limited edition of the album was also released that included: 2xLP, CD, MP3/FLAC download, untitled cassette with exclusive unreleased demo tracks available only on that format, Opossum tote bag, stickers, button and poster.

Untitled Rkives Bonus Cassette track listing:

Side one
No.	Title	Length
1.	"Close Call (Garage Band Demo)"
2.	"Pull Me in Tighter (Sunset Sound Demo)"
3.	"Are You Sad? (Blake's House)"
4.	"The Good That Won't Come Out (4 Track Demo)"

Side two
No.	Title	Length
1.	"All The Drugs (Garage Band Demo)"
2.	"Commoner (Wilton House Demo)"
3.	"That's How I Choose To Remember It (4 Track Demo)"

== Credits ==
Rilo Kiley

- Jenny Lewis – vocals, keyboards, guitar, bass guitar
- Blake Sennett – guitar, keyboards, vocals
- Pierre de Reeder – bass guitar, guitar, backing vocals
- Jason Boesel – drums, percussion (Tracks 1–14)
- Dave Rock – drums, percussion (Tracks 15–16)

Additional personnel

- Benji Hughes – guest vocals on track 8
- Too $hort – guest vocals on track 9
- Tim Kasher – guest vocals on track 10
- The Watson Twins – guest vocals on track 15.
