= Maybe This Christmas Too? =

2003 compilation album by various artists

Compilation album by various artists
- Released: October 7, 2003
- Genres: Holiday, folk, pop rock
- Label: Nettwerk
- Producer: Darin Harmon (executive)

Maybe This Christmas chronology
Maybe This Christmas (2002)	Maybe This Christmas Too? (2003)	Maybe This Christmas Tree (2004)

Maybe This Christmas Too? is a holiday compilation album released in October 2003 through Nettwerk Records featuring contemporary musicians performing both classic and original Christmas songs. The compilation served as a sequel to Maybe This Christmas (2002) and preceded Maybe This Christmas Tree (2004). A portion of the proceeds from the album went to Toys for Tots, a charity supported by the United States Marine Corps. Critical reception of the compilation, which failed to chart in any nation, was mixed.

== Background and composition ==
Maybe This Christmas Too? is a sequel to the 2002 compilation album Maybe This Christmas, which reached a peak position of number thirty-eight on Billboard's Top Holiday Albums chart. Maybe This Christmas Tree, released in 2004, was the third installment of the series. A portion of the proceeds from the sales of the three albums went to Toys for Tots, a charity supported by the United States Marine Corps. Maybe This Christmas Too? features fourteen tracks recorded by various artists, most of whom were associated with the Nettwerk record label during its release. Ten of the tracks were recorded specifically for this compilation album. Darin Harmon served as the album's executive producer and Ianthe Zevos served as the project manager. Mastering of the compilation was donated by Louie Teran. In August 2003, MTV reported on the possible inclusions of the Used's "Alone This Holiday", the Flaming Lips' "Winter Wonderland" and the Polyphonic Spree's "Winter Wonderslumber", none of which ended up on the final release.

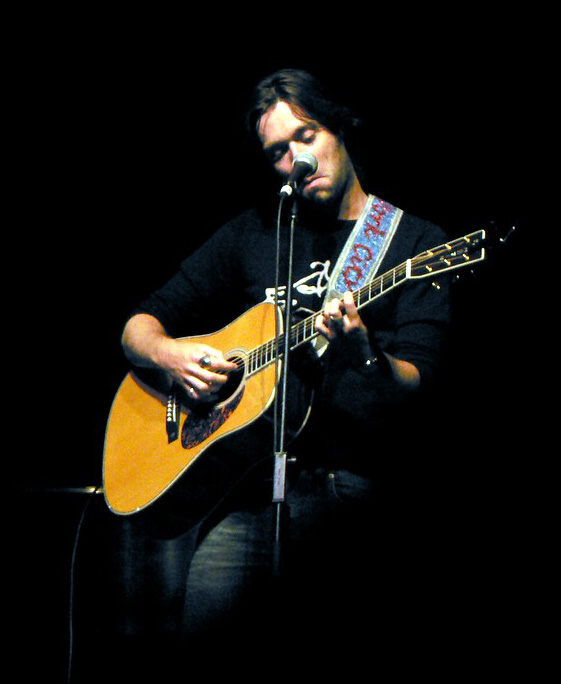
Rufus Wainwright's "Spotlight on Christmas" featured Teddy Thompson and Martha Wainwright and received a positive reception.

The album opens with Rufus Wainwright's "Spotlight on Christmas", an acoustic-based, original track recorded exclusively for this set. "Spotlight on Christmas" was written and produced by Wainwright; among other guests, the song features Teddy Thompson and Martha Wainwright on backing vocals and bells as well as Thompson on electric guitar. "The Winter Song" was written, arranged, and produced by members of Eisley. "O Holy Night", based on a poem by Placide Cappeau, was composed by Adolphe Adam and translated by John Sullivan Dwight. The song is performed by Avril Lavigne and Chantal Kreviazuk. Kreviazuk also produced the track. "Silent Night", performed by Lisa Hannigan, was originally recorded by Damien Rice for his 2002 studio album O. The song is less than two minutes in length and features original lyrics.

The band Rilo Kiley contributed "Xmas Cake", a song originally written by group members Jenny Lewis and Blake Sennett. The track was produced and mixed by Mike Mogis and features "jazzy guitar chords and a piano-led wintery feel" to address poverty and conflict. "¿Dónde Está Santa Claus?" (Spanish for "Where Is Santa Claus?") is performed by the band Guster and was produced, recorded, and mixed by Peter Katis. The track contains castanets, "bouncing" rhythm, and "silky" backing vocals. "Rudy", a song about "Rudolf the red-nosed wino", was originally written by Danny Dolinger; the version appearing on the compilation album was arranged and performed by The Be Good Tanyas. Instrumentation included: guitar, mandolin, organ, piano, percussion, and twelve-string guitar. "Christmas Song" was written by Dave Matthews and performed by the Dave Matthews Band. The "organ-tinged, gospel rendition" of "Go Tell It on the Mountain", originally written by John Wesley Work Jr. with traditional music, was arranged and given additional lyrics by Suzie Ungerleider (also known as Oh Susanna).

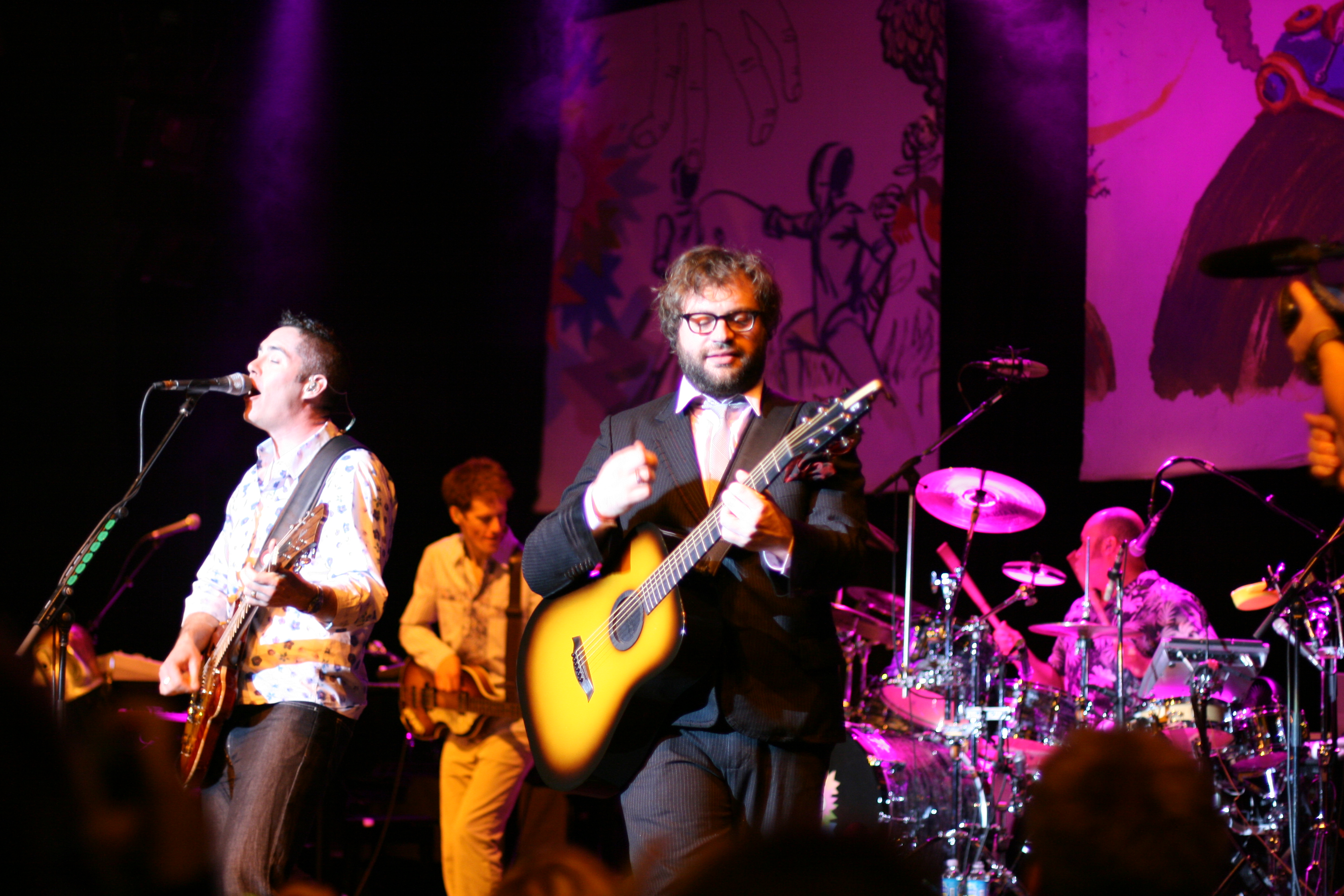
The Barenaked Ladies originally recorded "Green Christmas" for the 2000 film How the Grinch Stole Christmas.

The Barenaked Ladies' "Green Christmas", a song credited to Steven Page and Ed Robertson, about experiencing Christmas in a location where snow never falls, was recorded originally for the soundtrack to the 2000 film How the Grinch Stole Christmas. The acoustic studio version that appeared on Maybe This Christmas Too? differed from the soundtrack version as well as a third version appearing on the band's 2004 studio album Barenaked for the Holidays. Martina Sorbara performs a "vampish, bluesy" rendition of Edward Pola and George Wyle's "It's the Most Wonderful Time of the Year". The track was produced and recorded by David Matheson. "Donna & Blitzen" was written and performed by Badly Drawn Boy and features "bouncy vintage rock piano". Irving Berlin's "White Christmas" is performed by the Flaming Lips. Sixpence None the Richer performs "It Came Upon a Midnight Clear", the album's final track. The song contains music by Richard Storrs Willis and lyrics by Edmund Hamilton. The version was arranged by Matt Slocum, produced by Sam Ashworth and Taylor Harris, and engineered and mixed by Harris. Leigh Nash performs vocals, Slocum features on guitar, pedal steel and Wurlitzer, Rob Mitchell plays drums, and Justin Cary plays bass. Ashworth also contributed on EBow guitar and percussion, and Harris on percussion and programming.

== Reception ==
Professional ratings
Review scores
Source	Rating
Allmusic	3.5/5 stars

Allmusic's MacKenzie Wilson wrote that Maybe This Christmas Too? would appeal to "both casual and die-hard music fans of all ages". Wilson called Wainwright's performance "classic chamber pop with a warm spirit" and also noted the "fetching" graphic design work for the album's cover art by Brian "Goatpillow" Brooks of Cosmic Debris. Andrew Gilstrap's review for PopMatters also complimented "Spotlight on Christmas", calling the song a "clever piece of class-conscious commentary" that provides a "perfect example of [Wainwright's] meticulous toyshop brand of pop." Simmy Richman of The Independent considered the Flaming Lips' rendition of "White Christmas" to be the "strangest" he had ever heard. Gilstrap used the same adjective ("strange") to describe "O Holy Night", and thought "Silent Night" was "incredibly potent" despite its short length. The New York Times' Kelefa Sanneh called "White Christmas" "spooky" and wrote that the album "brings to the world something more ambivalent than joy". Gilbert concluded that Maybe This Christmas Too? "feels just about right" and "does a fine job of representing the less than stellar aspects of a wintry, commercialized holiday like Christmas." In 2008 The A.V. Club included "Spotlight on Christmas" as number thirty-nine on its list of "42 holiday entertainments that don't make us want to claw our eyes out with rage".

== Track listing ==
No.	Title	Writer(s)	Performed By	Length
1.	"Spotlight on Christmas"	Rufus Wainwright	Rufus Wainwright	3:22
2.	"The Winter Song"	Eisley	Eisley	4:34
3.	"O Holy Night"	Adolphe Adam, Placide Cappeau, John Sullivan Dwight	Avril Lavigne and Chantal Kreviazuk	4:22
4.	"Silent Night"	traditional	Lisa Hannigan	1:48
5.	"Xmas Cake"	Jenny Lewis, Blake Sennett	Rilo Kiley	5:22
6.	"¿Dónde Está Santa Claus?"	Alvin G. Grenier, Gordon Rod Parker, George Scheck	Guster	2:21
7.	"Rudy"	Danny Dolinger	The Be Good Tanyas	4:33
8.	"Christmas Song"	Dave Matthews	Dave Matthews Band	5:33
9.	"Go Tell It on the Mountain"	traditional	Oh Susanna	3:48
10.	"Green Christmas"	Steven Page, Ed Robertson	Barenaked Ladies	2:37
11.	"It's the Most Wonderful Time of the Year"	Edward Pola, George Wyle	Martina Sorbara	2:45
12.	"Donna & Blitzen"	Badly Drawn Boy	Badly Drawn Boy	3:29
13.	"White Christmas"	Irving Berlin	The Flaming Lips	4:20
14.	"It Came Upon a Midnight Clear"	Edmund Sears, Richard Storrs Willis	Sixpence None the Richer	3:46
Total length:				52:40

Track listing and song lengths adapted from album liner notes.

== Personnel ==
- Adolphe Adam – composer (3)
- Jon Aley – backing vocals (6), group member (6)
- Sam Ashworth – percussion (14), producer (14), ebow guitar (14), group member (14)
- Badly Drawn Boy – group (12)
- Barenaked Ladies – group (10)
- The Be Good Tanyas – arranger (7), group (7)
- Irving Berlin – author (13)
- Melissa Bisagni – backing vocals (6)
- Brian "Goatpillow" Brooks – graphic design, design, layout design
- Justin Cary – bass (14), group member (14)
- Jay Crouch – assistant engineer (6), backing vocals (6)
- Dave Matthews Band – group (8)
- Leon Dewan – arranger (6), backing vocals (6), bass (6), guitar (6)
- Danny Dolinger – author (7)
- Bazil Donovan – bass (9), group member (9), guitar (9)
- Sabrina Duim – harp (5)
- John Sullivan Dwight – English translations (3)
- Eisley – arranger (2), producer (2), vocals (2), writer (2)
- Matthew Elkins – choir (5), chorus (5)
- Alma Fernandez – viola (3)
- The Flaming Lips – group (13)
- Frazey Ford – vocals (7), group member (7)
- Samuel Formicola – violin (3)
- Brian E. Garcia – mixing
- Camille Giroux – drums (9), group member (9), vocals (9)
- Alvin G. Grenier – writer (6)
- Guster – group (6), instrumentation (6), vocals (6)
- Edmund Hamilton – author (14)
- Lisa Hannigan – publisher (4), vocals (4)
- Darin Harmon – executive producer
- Taylor Harris – percussion (14), programming (14), producer (14), engineer (14), mixing (14)
- Jeff Hill – bass (1)
- Greg White Hunt – engineer (2)
- Matt Johnson – drums (1)
- Henry Katis – backing vocals (6)
- Peter Katis – producer (6), engineer (6), mixing (6)
- Tarquin Katis – backing vocals (6)
- Tom Katis – backing vocals (6)
- Rilo Kiley – vocals (5)
- Trish Klein – mandolin (7), vocals (7), group member (7)
- Chantal Kreviazuk – producer (3), vocals (3)
- Tom Lagleder – choir (5), chorus (5)
- Avril Lavigne – vocals (3)
- Victor Lawrence – cello (3)
- Gary Leach – engineer (2)
- Philip Levesque – choir (5), chorus (5)
- Jenny Lewis – writer (5)
- Dave Matthews – author (8)
- David Matheson – producer (11), engineer (11)
- Rob Mitchell – drums (14), group member (14)
- Mike Mogis – mixing (5), producer (5)
- Leigh Nash – vocals (14), group member (14)
- Tim Oberthier – engineer (10), mixing (10)
- Matt Orifice – backing vocals (6), group member (6)
- Bob Packwood – group member (9), organ (9), piano (9)
- Steven Page – author (10)
- Gordon Rod Parker – writer (6)
- Samantha Parton – group member (7), guitar (7), mixing (7), organ (7), producer (7), vocals (7)
- Damien Rice – engineer (4)
- Edward Pola – author (11)
- Florence Riggs – choir (5), chorus (5)
- Ed Robertson – author (10)
- Mark Robertson – violin (3)
- George Scheck – writer (6)
- Tom Schick – mixing (1)
- David Schneider – backing vocals (6), group member (6)
- Blake Sennett – writer (5)
- Chris Shreenan-Dyck – engineer (9)
- Kerri Silvestri – backing vocals (6)
- Sixpence None the Richer – group (14)
- Matt Slocum – guitar (14), pedal steel (14), arranger (14), Wurlitzer (14), group member (14)
- Brodie Smith – engineer (7), group member (7), mixing (7), organ (7), percussion (7), piano (7), producer (7), twelve-string guitar (7)
- Louie Teran – mastering
- Teddy Thompson – backing vocalist (1), bells (1), electric guitar (1)
- Suzie Ungerleider – arranger (9), group member (9), lyrics (9), vocals (9)
- Martha Wainwright – backing vocalist (1), bells (1)
- Rufus Wainwright – acoustic guitar (1), bells (1), piano (1), producer (1), vocals (1)
- John Wesley Work Jr. – author (9)
- Richard Storrs Willis – composer (14)
- George Wyle – author (11)
- The Zambonis – backing vocals (6), group (6)
- Ianthe Zevos – project manager

Credits adapted from Allmusic and album liner notes.
