= Kelsey Brookes =

American artist

Kelsey Ross Brookes (born 1978) is an artist who resides in San Diego, California. He is associated with RVCA, Pictures On Walls in London, Lazarides Gallery in London, as well as a number of other ongoing projects.

== Early life ==
Born in 1978 in Denver, Colorado.

Kelsey spent 2002 surfing and living out of a car in Australia. Upon returning from Australia he moved from Colorado to San Diego, California.

== Fine art and other projects ==
In 2005 Kelsey Brookes left the science industry to pursue a full-time career in art. He began to develop a unique style of figurative art.

In April 2006 Kelsey began a relationship with the San Diego, California, indie band Grand Ole Party doing the cover art for their EP release that year. Again, in 2007 Kelsey did the cover of GOP's LP album Humanimals.

In 2012, Brookes' artwork will be featured on the I'm with You outtakes which are nine seven-inch singles by Red Hot Chili Peppers. When each single is combined together they form one larger piece of artwork. The artwork is titled "Iris" and featured in Brookes' new "Meditations on Symmetry" series on display in Malibu, California in 2012.

== Influences, inspiration, and classic images ==
According to his website, "Kelsey's figurative paintings draw influence from Hindu and Buddhist deities, exotic animals and sex, as well as rustic American quilts. Each figure is adorned with ghostly representations of the natural world... animals and plants that unfold from the body into the surrounding canvas. His chimeras are frozen with animalistic intensity in explosive and sometimes tortured positions. Kelsey blames his raw, anxious form on the U.S. university system which refuses to teach its scientists how to draw."

In 2006 he told the Art Blog "Most of my influence comes from a desire of beautiful women (me and every other bi-pedal ape with a twig and two berries hanging between his legs), a childhood love of the discovery channel, and a more recent interest in Hindu Folk art. Funny how when that all comes together it looks like pop."

Kelsey as stated that his album art images have been influenced by a number of artists. "Almost all of Santana’s albums are great, but I especially liked Abraxas and Amigos...just stunning work on both albums. Tommy Guerrero has worked with a bunch of really amazing artists, too. Barry McGee, Stephen Powers, Margaret Kilgallen, and Thomas Campbell have all done covers for him. Beck did a cool collaboration with Marcel Dzama on his Guero album, which I liked a lot. With bands, right now I’ve mostly just done Grand Ole Party. We have set up an exclusivity agreement...I think it’s cool when you can have a specific artist associated with a specific band: think Raymond Pettibon and Black Flag (band) and Minutemen. We wanted to set up that type of relationship.”

== Exhibitions ==
=== Solo Shows ===
2017:

"1.618 Monoprints" Pace Prints, New York, NY 2017

"The Mathematics Underlying Art" Jacob Lewis Gallery, New York, NY

"Position" Library Street Collective, Detroit, MI

2015:

"Psychedelic Space" Quint Gallery, La Jolla, CA

"Plants Of The Gods" Eric Firestone Gallery, East Hampton, NY

2013:

"Better Living Through Chemistry" Judith Charles Gallery, New York, NY

2012:

"Meditations on Symmetry" - Malibu, CA

2009:

"Kelsey Brookes: BIGGER, BRIGHTER, BOLDER" - Quint Contemporary Art, La Jolla CA

2008:

"Kelsey Brookes"- New Image Gallery, Los Angeles, CA

2007:

"Supernumerary"- Milieu Galerie/Artspace, Bern, CH

=== Group shows ===
2009:

"HOMING IN: An Exhibition of 50 San Diego Artist" @ Quint Contemporary Art - La Jolla, CA

2008:

"Kids Today" @ Semi Permanent Conference- StupidKrap.com, Sydney, AU

"Poster Renaissance 2"- New Image Art, Los Angeles, US

2007:

"Santa's Ghetto"- Pictures on Walls, Bethlehem, Palestine

"Replace 'Please' with Fast & 'Thank you' with Good"- Lab 101, Los Angeles, US

"Aqua Art Miami" @ Art Basel- New Image Art Gallery, Miami, US

"Brodeo"- New Image Art Gallery, Los Angeles, US

"Ten Years After..."- Colette, Paris, FR

"The Return of Sanity"- Andenken Gallery, Denver, US

2006:

"Santa's Ghetto"- Pictures on Walls, London, UK

"The 125th Anniversary of the Internet"- Fecal Face, Black Market Gallery, Los Angeles, US

"TNT Inside-Out"- Museum of Contemporary Art San Diego, San Diego, US

"Stench"- Lazarides Gallery, London, UK

2005:

"Santa's Ghetto"- Pictures on Walls, London, UK
