= Green Christmas =

Green Christmas may refer to:

- "Green Christmas" (Barenaked Ladies song), a song by the Barenaked Ladies from the How the Grinch Stole Christmas film soundtrack
- "Green Christmas" (Stan Freberg song), a piece of audio theater written and performed by Stan Freberg and Daws Butler
- Green Christmas Festival, an annual rock festival in Estonia
- A Christmas with no snow on the ground, the opposite of a White Christmas
- Green Christmas (Big City Greens), a TV episode
