= I never (disambiguation) =

I never may refer to:

- I Never, a drinking game especially popular with University students
- "I Never", a song by Jessica Simpson from her 2001 album Irresistible
- "I Never", a song by Rilo Kiley from their 2004 album More Adventurous
