= The Honorary Title =

American indie rock band (2002–2009)

- Origin: Brooklyn, New York, United States
- Genres: Indie rock, Alt-country
- Years active: 2002–2009
- Labels: Doghouse, Warner Bros.
- Past members: Jarrod Gorbel; Adam Boyd; Jeff Klein; Ethan Kaufmann; Aaron Kamstra; Jon Wiley; Mike Schey; Nate Harold; Dustin Dobernig

The Honorary Title was an American alternative indie rock band from Brooklyn, New York, United States. The band released their first self-titled EP "The Honorary Title" in 2003 and then their first album in 2004, Anything Else but the Truth, which was later re-released with five additional songs and two bonus videos. In early 2007 the EP, "Untouched and Intact" arrived introducing four songs, three of which were re-released in the group's latest album, Scream & Light Up the Sky, which was released on August 28, 2007.

== Biography ==
The band began in 2003 with just Gorbel's vocals and Kamstra's multi-instrumental talents, where they played with an indie record label before being signed onto Doghouse Records. After releasing their debut album, Anything Else But The Truth in 2004, the band eventually signed on ex-member of The Format, Adam Boyd (formerly of Greeley Estates), along with Jonathan Wiley. After heavy touring, the Honorary Title released Scream and Light Up The Sky in 2007. In late 2007, Aaron Kamstra left the band because of the constant touring schedule. Jonathan Wiley also left the band to tour with Adam Green. In an interview with Absolutepunk.net on April 1, 2008, Gorbel said, "Aaron and I always had different ideas of where we were headed both musically, artistically, personally blah blah blah. We spent more time arguing than actually creating music. I wish him the best of luck. Jon is currently touring with Adam Green. There's no hard feelings, but we will miss him anyways; both amazing musicians."

Gorbel released a solo EP called Ten Years Older on his 2009 acoustic tour with Dustin Dobernig. In an interview with weworemasks.com, Gorbel says, "It’s considered a solo session, but…The Honorary Title might be over." He also said he is working on a solo LP. On October 24, 2009, Jarrod announced that The Honorary Title would play their final show on Friday, November 20, 2009.

On August 31, 2010, Gorbel released his first solo LP "Devil's Made a New Friend" under label Burning House Records.

Gorbel supported Hanson on the 3rd leg of their Shout It Out tour, starting November 1, 2010 in Dallas, TX and ending November 23 in Toronto, Ontario.

In 2012, Gorbel founded a new band, Night Terrors of 1927, along with friend Blake Sennett, former lead guitarist of the band Rilo Kiley. On May 5, 2017 having seen the release of two EPs and a full-length album, Night Terrors of 1927 announced their end. That same day Gorbel announced his involvement with a new band, Mourners, and a side project entitled Numblife.

On April 3, 2018, The Honorary Title announced on their Facebook page a reunion show to celebrate the 15th release anniversary of their first self-titled EP. The reunion show consisted of the band playing their first album, Anything Else But The Truth, in its entirety. The show was played June 1 at the Troubadour in Los Angeles with opening band Limbeck who frequently accompanied the band on their previous tours. Three more dates in August were eventually added for shows in Chicago, Brooklyn and San Francisco.

== Members ==
- Jarrod Gorbel – lead vocals, guitar
- Aaron Kamstra - Bass, keyboard
- Adam Boyd – drums, vocals
- Mike Schey - guitar
- Nate Harold - bass
- Dustin Dobernig - keyboard

== Discography ==
=== Studio albums ===
- 2004: Anything Else but the Truth
- 2007: Scream & Light Up the Sky

=== EPs ===
- 2003: The Honorary Title
- 2007: Untouched and Intact [EP]
- 2008: The City On Christmas [EP]
- 2009: Tour [EP]

=== Solo releases ===
- 2009: Ten Years Older [EP]
- 2010: Devil's Made a New Friend
- 2011: Bruises From Your Bad Dreams [EP]

=== Compilations ===
- Doghouse 100 – "Snow Day"
- Paupers, Peasants, Princes & Kings: The Songs of Bob Dylan – "Simple Twist of Fate"
- The Road Mix: Music from the Television Series One Tree Hill, Volume 3 – "Stay Away"
- Take Action Volume 6 – "Untouched and Intact"
- True Crime: New York City (Videogame) - "Bridge and Tunnel"

== Other information ==
Lost stars Dominic Monaghan and Daniel Dae Kim are known to be fans, Monaghan introducing Kim to the band while filming.

The band is featured on The CW drama One Tree Hill soundtrack The Road Mix: Music from the Television Series One Tree Hill, Vol. 3.They also performed in episode 7 of season 5 of One Tree Hill entitled "In Da Club".

Their song "Accident Prone" was featured in the 2007 comedy Good Luck Chuck.

Their song "Bridge and Tunnel" was featured in the 2005 video game True Crime New York City.

Several songs from both albums have been featured on ABC Family's (now Freeform) Greek.
