= I'm with You Sessions =

I'm With You Sessions / I'm Beside You

Compilation album by Red Hot Chili Peppers
- Released: November 29, 2013
- Recorded: September 14, 2010 – March 18, 2011
- Studios: East West in Los Angeles, California, and Shangri La in Malibu, California
- Genre: Rock
- Length: 73:18
- Label: Warner Bros.
- Producer: Rick Rubin

Red Hot Chili Peppers chronology
Rock & Roll Hall of Fame Covers EP (2012)	I'm With You Sessions / I'm Beside You (2013)	I'm with You World Tour (2014)

I'm with You Sessions (also known as I'm with You Singles Collection and I'm Beside You) is a group of nine singles by American rock band Red Hot Chili Peppers featuring 17 songs recorded in contention for the band's tenth studio album, I'm with You (2011).

Produced by Rick Rubin, each release contains two songs featuring an A-side and a B-side and they are available worldwide through 7" vinyl and digital download. The singles were also released as a double LP vinyl set, entitled I'm Beside You, in November 2013 and was sold exclusively on Record Store Day.

== Background ==
During a Q&A on May 5, 2012, Chad Smith announced through his Twitter page that the album's unreleased songs would eventually see the light of day. On May 27, 2012, Smith said in response to a tweet that, at some point in the next six months, the band would be releasing 10 unreleased songs on 7-inch and as digital downloads. Flea followed up Smith's announcement a few days later on May 29, 2012, by stating that 18 unreleased songs from the I'm with You sessions would be released over the next six months. He also confirmed that the band has been writing new music while touring.

Josh Klinghoffer commented on the unreleased songs by saying "Finding songs that seem to want to join hands with others is a special task that require the right people...and the right songs! Some songs seem to have a lot more of an agenda than others. Some songs play well with others and some songs need more attention and a little extra care. Here are some songs that seemed to want to pair up and take a later train. Keep your eye on them, they're up to something..."

Smith said in July 2012 of the unreleased songs that "We just wanted them to come out because we just really like them. We didn't want them to get lost, so we're gonna put them out, mainly for our fans. They would've waited for the Warner Bros. box set in, like, 2020, if there's even a record company around then. I'm glad they're going to see the light of day because it's an important part of the band and what we were doing at the time." On the sound of the songs, Smith says he finds it "hard to explain" what the first two songs to be released sound like but describes "Long Progression" as "kind of a flowing, kind of midtempo funk". He also stated the band is currently working on new music. "Those are just waiting," Smith said. "We'll go back to those when we start writing again, I'm sure – or not. We're just always trying to come up with new stuff; usually the latest and greatest is what we use, but you never know."

== Writing and composition ==
All of the seventeen songs were recorded during the sessions for I'm with You. "Long Progression", the B-side to "Strange Man" which was the first single released, almost made the album's final cut but was left off in favor of "Goodbye Hooray". One of the songs, "In Love Dying" is an eight-minute rocker captured in a single studio take that occupies both sides of a single, as Klinghoffer told Rolling Stone from a recent tour stop in Berne, Switzerland. “We’re going to have to do that old trick where it fades out and fades back in on the B-side.” Another cut, “Victorian Machinery” “sounds like a big three-headed monster playing drums,” Klinghoffer said, adding that the band captured “absolute magic” with “Never Is a Long Time,” a “pop-tastic” number featuring Greg Kurstin on piano. “It's really one of those cases where they had too many good songs to fit on an album. They have this cohesive thing in the studio – when they get that take, that’s the take that they keep.”

“It's always difficult, but we use a democratic process and the songs with the most votes are usually the backbone of the album,” producer Rick Rubin wrote in an email. “I can just say as is always the case, some of my personal favorites don’t make the cut. I’m sure everyone in the band can tell you the same.”

In an interview, Klinghoffer said the band spent time in 2012 and 2013 doing post-session work for some of the B-sides.

Klinghoffer also said they recorded 48 songs during the album's sessions and some could eventually see the light of day. “It's possible,” Klinghoffer said. “We just had so much material back then that certain things just straight-up didn’t get enough attention. There’s a couple that will probably just remain in our iPods.”

== Artwork ==
Each of the nine seven-inches feature cover artwork by Kelsey Brookes, and when combined, form one larger piece of artwork. The artwork is titled "Iris" and featured in Brookes' new "Meditations on Symmetry" series which was displayed from March 2012 at Compound Project in Malibu, California. Brookes' well-documented background in microbiology, surf culture and folk art combine in explosive prisms of raucous color, bold imagery and timeless motifs. His work has appeared in countless group shows, art fairs, and magazines such as GQ, Modern Painters, Juxtapoz, Beautiful Decay and Dazed & Confused. However, the artwork was sightly modified for the single's release, by rotating the image 45 degrees.

The back cover of each release features handwritten lyrics by vocalist and lyricist Anthony Kiedis.

== Track listing ==
I'm Beside You track listing

All songs written and composed by Anthony Kiedis, Flea, Chad Smith & Josh Klinghoffer.

Side one

1. "Strange Man" – 3:36 (August 14, 2012)
2. "'Long Progression'" – 3:58 (August 14, 2012)
3. "Magpies on Fire" – 3:44 (September 11, 2012)
4. "Victorian Machinery" – 4:06 (September 11, 2012)

Side two

1. "Never Is a Long Time" – 2:46 (October 2, 2012)
2. "Love of Your Life" – 4:06 (October 2, 2012)
3. "The Sunset Sleeps" – 3:58 (November 6, 2012)
4. "Hometown Gypsy" – 4:02 (November 6, 2012)
5. "Pink as Floyd" – 4:54 (January 4, 2013)

Side three

1. "Your Eyes Girl" – 5:08 (January 4, 2013)
2. "In Love Dying" – 8:04 (February 1, 2013)
3. "Catch My Death" – 4:19 (July 23, 2013)
4. "How It Ends" – 3:43 (July 23, 2013)

Side four

1. "Brave From Afar" – 3:44 (July 23, 2013)
2. "This Is the Kitt" – 4:23 (July 23, 2013)
3. "Hanalei" – 4:17 (July 23, 2013)
4. "Open/Close" – 4:30 (July 23, 2013)

Notes:

- The first eight songs are also featured on the I'm with You – Australian Tour Edition which was released on January 11, 2013, exclusively in Australia to promote the band's 2013 tour dates in that country on a second extra disc, the first disc featuring the I'm with You studio album.

== Personnel ==
Red Hot Chili Peppers

- Flea – bass, backing vocals
- Anthony Kiedis – lead vocals
- Josh Klinghoffer – guitar, backing vocals
- Chad Smith – drums, percussion

Additional musicians

- Mauro Refosco – additional percussion ("Strange Man", "Long Progression", "Victorian Machinery", "This Is the Kitt")
- Lenny Castro – additional percussion ("Magpies on Fire")
- Greg Kurstin – piano ("Never Is a Long Time", "Hometown Gypsy", "How It Ends")
- Henry Kwapis – shaker ("Never Is a Long Time")
- Vanessa Freebairn-Smith – string arrangements, cello ("Pink as Floyd")
- Alwyn Wright – viola ("Pink as Floyd")
- Caroline Campbell – violin ("Pink as Floyd")
- Kathleen Sloan – viola ("Pink as Floyd")
