= Scream & Light Up the Sky =

Studio album by the Honorary Title
- Released: August 28, 2007
- Genre: Indie rock; alternative rock
- Length: 47:24
- Label: Doghouse; Reprise
- Producer: Rob Schnapf; Butch Walker

The Honorary Title chronology
Anything Else but the Truth (2004)	Scream & Light Up the Sky (2007)

Professional ratings
Review scores
Source	Rating
AllMusic	4/5 stars
Okayplayer	3.5/5 stars
PopMatters	8/10

Scream & Light Up the Sky is the second and final studio album by indie rock band the Honorary Title. It was released in association with Doghouse Records and Reprise Records on August 28, 2007. The album was produced by Rob Schnapf with the exception of the track "Stuck at Sea," which was produced by Butch Walker. The album title is taken from the song "The City's Summer".

== Track listing ==
No.	Title	Length
1.	"Thin Layer"	4:13
2.	"Stay Away"	4:10
3.	"Untouched & Intact"	3:06
4.	"Stuck at Sea"	4:19
5.	"Far More"	4:35
6.	"Radiate"	3:00
7.	"Along the Way"	5:08
8.	"Apologize"	3:13
9.	"The City's Summer"	2:54
10.	"Only One Week"	4:10
11.	"Wait Until I'm Gone"	5:07
12.	"Even If"	3:37
