= Anything Else but the Truth =

Studio album by The Honorary Title
- Released: June 1, 2004
- Genre: Indie rock, acoustic, emo
- Length: 47:42
- Label: Doghouse

The Honorary Title chronology
Anything Else but the Truth (2004)	Scream & Light Up the Sky (2007)

Professional ratings
Review scores
Source	Rating
AllMusic	3.5/5 stars
Rolling Stone	3/5 stars

Anything Else but the Truth is the first studio album by The Honorary Title. The album was originally released in 2004, but was later re-released with different album art in 2006.

== Track listing ==
No.	Title	Length
1.	"Frame by Frame"	4:25
2.	"Bridge and Tunnel"	3:54
3.	"Everything I Once Had"	3:49
4.	"Cut Short"	4:19
5.	"Points Underneath"	3:29
6.	"Anything Else but the Truth"	4:05
7.	"Revealing Too Much"	4:03
8.	"Snow Day"	4:20
9.	"Disengage"	4:03
10.	"The Smoking Pose"	2:34
11.	"Petals"	4:10
12.	"Cats in Heat"	4:31

=== Rerelease album ===
The rerelease album comes with a second disk contained five bonus songs and music videos of "Everything I Once Had" and "Bridge and Tunnel".

No.	Title	Length
1.	"Soft, Pale and Pure"	3:40
2.	"Smoking Pose" (Alternate version)	3:58
3.	"Never Said"	3:12
4.	"Reason to Celebrate"	5:04
5.	"Bridge and Tunnel" (Alternate version)	6:50
