= Presto! Recording Studios =

Presto! Recording Studios is located in Lincoln, Nebraska, and run by brothers Mike Mogis and A.J. Mogis. The studio began in the brothers' North Platte, Nebraska basement and around 1995 moved to the basement of a Lincoln home. First known as Whoopass Recording Studio, the name was later changed to Dead Space Recording. When the brothers moved the studio to its current downtown Lincoln location, they found a vintage Presto brand vinyl recorder left behind by the studio's former occupant, from which the current name was taken.

Because of Lincoln's plan to dismantle most of the streets around the facility in the distant future, Mike Mogis is planning to relocate Presto! Studios to a 5,000-square-foot (460 m^{2}) indoor basketball court in Omaha, Nebraska. The new studio will be co-owned by Mike Mogis and Conor Oberst. A.J. Mogis has not yet decided if he will be involved.

== Artists who have recorded at Presto! ==
- Boys Life
- Bright Calm Blue
- Bright Eyes
- Broken Spindles
- Christie Front Drive
- The Concretes
- Criteria
- Cursive
- Desaparecidos
- The Faint
- For Against
- The Get Up Kids
- Giant's Chair
- The Gloria Record
- The Good Life
- Jeff Hanson
- Head of Femur
- Her Flyaway Manner
- Lightspeed Champion
- Lucia Lie
- Lullaby for the Working Class
- Mayday
- Melon Galia
- Mercy Rule
- Neva Dinova
- Pablo's Triangle
- Planet Butter
- Racebannon
- Rilo Kiley
- Schatzi
- Sideshow
- Songs: Ohia
- Son, Ambulance
- Sorry About Dresden
- Tilly and the Wall
- Why Make Clocks
- The JV Allstars
- Straight Outta Junior High

== Record labels that have worked with Presto! ==
- Arena Rock Records
- Bad News Records (Japan)
- Bar None Records
- Better Looking Records
- Brute/Beaute
- Caulfield Records
- Crank
- Divot
- Flydaddy Records
- Greyday Records
- -ismist Recordings
- les disques Manage-tout (France)
- Mt. Fuji Records
- Rubric Records
- Rykodisc
- Saddle Creek Records
- Secretly Canadian
- Sound Station (Belgium)
- Tigerstyle
- Western Vinyl
- Wichita Records
- Victory Records
- Polydor/A&M Records/Universal Music Group
- wunkrock records
