= Humanimals =

Studio album by Grand Ole Party
- Released: August 7, 2007 (digital download); February 5, 2008 (physical copy)
- Genre: Garage punk Indie rock Art punk Blues rock
- Length: 38:07
- Label: DH
- Producer: Blake Sennett

Professional ratings
Review scores
Source	Rating
Crawdaddy!	(favorable)
Pitchfork Media	(6.3/10)

Humanimals is the debut album released by San Diego–based alternative rock band Grand Ole Party. It was released on August 7, 2007, on iTunes and was released on DH Records, February 5, 2008.

The album was engineered by Jason Cupp at Eldorado Recording Studios and produced by Blake Sennett of Rilo Kiley and The Elected.

== Track listing ==
1. "Look Out Young Son"
2. "Belle Isle"
3. "Turn On, Burn On"
4. "INSANE"
5. "Nasty Habits"
6. "Bad, Bad Man"
7. "Redrum Heart"
8. "Dirty Spirit Rag"
9. "Gypsy March"
10. "Troubadour of the Water"
11. "Saviour"
12. "Roll On Down"
13. "Radio" (Scientist Remix)
14. "Shot in the Alley"
