= ¿Dónde Está Santa Claus? =

1958 novelty Christmas song performed by Augie Rios

Single by Augie Rios 1946-2019

from the album ¿Dónde Está Santa Claus?
- B-side: "Ol' Fatso"
- Released: 1958
- Genre: Rock, Christmas
- Length: 2:20
- Label: Metro
- Songwriters: George Scheck, Rod Parker, and Al Greiner

Augie Rios 1946-2019 singles chronology
"¿Dónde Está Santa Claus?" (1958)	"Run Rattler Run" (1959)

"¿Dónde Está Santa Claus?" (Spanish for Where Is Santa Claus?) (also known on other versions as "Mamacita") is a 1958 novelty Christmas song written by George Scheck, Rod Parker, and Al Greiner and performed by Augie Rios.

== Release ==
12-year-old Augie Rios had a hit with the song "¿Dónde Está Santa Claus?" in 1958 which featured the Mark Jeffrey Orchestra. Written by George Scheck, Rod Parker, and Al Greiner, and copyrighted in 1958, the copyright was renewed and is owned by Ragtime Music. The song was originally released on MGM Records' Metro label. The 45 record single was backed with the song "Ol' Fatso (I Don't Care Who You Are Old Fatso, Get Those Reindeer Off My Roof)".

== Other versions ==
- A cover version was released by Toni Sante on Parkway Records in 1965.
- It was also covered by actress Charo in 1978 as well as a Spanish-language version by Mexican TV host Chabelo, El Vez from the album Merry Mex-mas.
- The rock band Guster covered the song in 2003 (on the Maybe This Christmas Too? holiday compilation album).
- The a cappella men's singing group Straight No Chaser covers the song on their Christmas Cheers CD (Atlantic Records, 2009).
- A Latin ska version of the song in English and Spanish was recorded and released by California band Mento Buru for their holiday ep "East Bakersfield Christmas" in 2020.
- A cover version was released by Senses Fail in 2020.

=== Kumbia All Starz version ===
"Mamacita Dónde Está Santa Claus"

Song by A.B. Quintanilla y Los Kumbia All Starz

from the album Ayer Fue Kumbia Kings, Hoy Es Kumbia All Starz (Fan Edition)
- Released: October 2, 2007
- Recorded: 2007
- Genre: Cumbia
- Length: 3:22
- Label: EMI
- Songwriters: George Scheck, Rod Parker, and Al Greiner
- Producer: A.B. Quintanilla III

A version of the song by A.B. Quintanilla and Kumbia All Starz appears on the fan edition of the album Ayer Fue Kumbia Kings, Hoy Es Kumbia All Starz, released on October 2, 2007. The song was retitled from "¿Dónde Está Santa Claus?" to "Mamacita Donde Esta Santa Claus"

== Popular culture ==
- The song is referred to in Cheech and Chong's holiday hit "Santa Claus and His Old Lady".
- The song appears in the 2011 movie A Very Harold & Kumar 3D Christmas and is heard in the 2007 movie Where God Left His Shoes.
- The song also appears during a Christmas scene in the episode "Los Pepes" in season 2 of the TV series Narcos.
- It also features in the 2017 Netflix film El Camino Christmas.
- The Toni Sante version was featured in the 2022 Christmas action comedy Violent Night starring David Harbour.
- "¿Dónde Está Santa Claus?" was used in a television commercial for Amazon during the 2023 Christmas season.
