= Blake Sennett =

American musician and actor (born 1973)

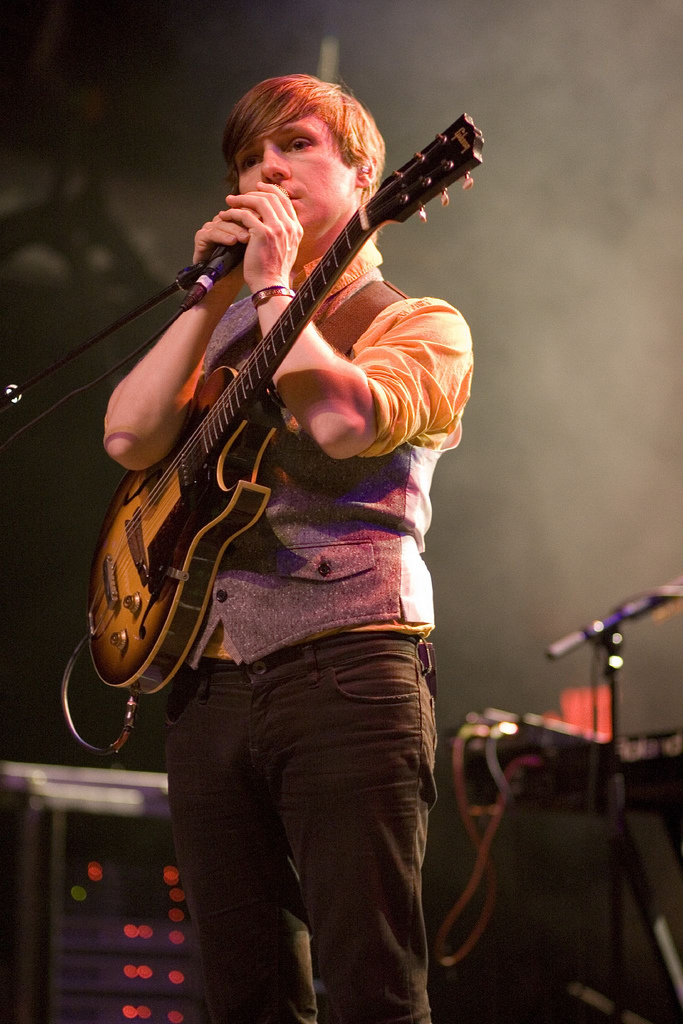
- Sennett performing with Rilo Kiley in 2008

Background information
- Also known as: Blake Soper, Blake Swendson
- Born: Blake Sennett Swendson; September 22, 1973 (age 52)
- Origin: San Diego, California, U.S.
- Genres: Indie rock, folk rock
- Occupations: Actor, musician
- Years active: 1987–present
- Labels: Brute-Beaute/Warner Bros.; Saddle Creek; Barsuk (in the band Rilo Kiley); Sub Pop (in the band The Elected); Atlantic (in the band Night Terrors of 1927)

Blake Sennett (born September 22, 1973) is an American musician and actor who serves as the lead guitarist for indie rock band Rilo Kiley, as well as the lead singer/guitarist for his alt-rock side project the Elected. Until 2017 he led Night Terrors of 1927 with Jarrod Gorbel. In addition to being a musician, Sennett was a teen actor, appearing on the television shows Salute Your Shorts and Boy Meets World. As an actor, Sennett originally went by the names Blake Soper and Blake Swendson.

== Early years ==
Sennett was born Blake Sennett Swendson in San Diego. He attended La Jolla High School with his future Rilo Kiley bandmate Pierre De Reeder. He met Rilo Kiley bandmate Jenny Lewis through Tara Subkoff in 1993. The two formed the band in 1998 and dated for several years, until ending their relationship after the release of The Execution of All Things in 2002.

In the early to mid-1990s, Sennett appeared in television shows primarily marketed toward teens. During this period he ended up playing two big supporting roles, Ronnie Pinsky on Salute Your Shorts and Joseph "Joey the Rat" Epstein on Boy Meets World. After Salute Your Shorts was canceled and his role on Boy Meets World was written off, Sennett switched gears and began to focus on music.

== Music ==
In the early 1990s, when Sennett was in high school, he played drums in a band called the Caustic Truth. Future Rilo Kiley bassist Pierre De Reeder was his bandmate. Sennett was kicked out of the band, and the remaining members kept his drums.

In 1996, he composed the score for the film Don's Plum. Lewis was the female lead in the film. Because of a lawsuit brought by stars Leonardo DiCaprio and Tobey Maguire, this film cannot be distributed in the United States or Canada. However, it was released in 2001 in Europe as a Region 2 DVD. This version contains Sennett's original score, as well as the song "Go Ahead," written by Sennett and Jenny Lewis in 1996. The song was included on Rilo Kiley's first LP, Take-Offs and Landings (2001). Sennett has remained good friends with Maguire, Ethan Suplee, and Scott Bloom since the making of the film. He had previously starred with Ben Savage and Suplee on Boy Meets World.

In 2003, he founded a second band, the Elected, along with his good friend Mike Bloom.

In 2012, Blake Sennett founded Night Terrors of 1927 along with Jarrod Gorbel. The band released an EP titled Guilty Pleas in November 2013.

== Discography ==
=== With Rilo Kiley ===
==== Albums ====
- Take-Offs and Landings (2001, Barsuk)
- The Execution of All Things (2002, Saddle Creek)
- More Adventurous (2004, Brute/Beaute)
- Under the Blacklight (2007, Brute/Beaute)

==== EPs ====
- Sandbox Sessions (1998, demo tape)
- Rilo Kiley (first pressing, 1999, Rilo Records)
- Rilo Kiley (second pressing, 2000, Rilo Records)
- The Initial Friend E.P. (2001, Rilo Records)
- Live at Fingerprints EP (2004, Brute/Beaute)
- Breakin’ Up (2008, Warner Bros. Records)
- Untitled Rkives Bonus Cassette (2013, Little Record Company)
- Rilo Kiley (fourth pressing, 2020, Little Record Company)

==== Singles ====
- "Science vs. Romance/About the Moon" [7"] (2001, Falsetto Records, FR002)
- "After Hours" [Split 7" with Bright Eyes and Sorry About Dresden] (2002, Devil in the Woods, issue #4.3)
- "The Execution of All Things/Emotional/After Hours" [7" & CD] (2003, Saddle Creek, SCE-56)
- "Portions for Foxes/A Town Called Luckey" [CD] (2005, Brute/Beaute, Warner Bros. Records)
- "Portions for Foxes/American Wife/Portions For Foxes" [CD] (2005, Brute/Beaute, Warner Bros. Records)
- "It's a Hit/Patiently" [7" & CD] (2005, Brute/Beaute, Warner Bros. Records)
- "It's a Hit/Simply Irresistible" [CD] (2005, Warner Bros. Records)

==== Compilations ====
- Saddle Creek 50 (2002, Saddle Creek) songs: "With Arms Outstretched," "Jenny, You're Barely Alive"

=== With the Elected ===
==== Albums ====
- Me First (2004 · Sub Pop)
- Sun, Sun, Sun (2006 · Sub Pop)
- Bury Me in My Rings (2011 · Vagrant Records)

==== Compilations ====
- Lagniappe: A Saddle Creek Benefit for Hurricane Katrina (2005 · Saddle Creek)

song: "San Francisco via Chicago Blues"

==== Other appearances ====
- Bright Eyes – Lifted or The Story Is in the Soil, Keep Your Ear to the Ground (2002 · Saddle Creek)

==== Videography ====
- "Not Going Home" (2006, directed by Nik Fackler)
- "Go for the Throat" (2011, directed by Noah Dorsey)

=== With Night Terrors of 1927 ===
==== Albums ====
- Everything's Coming Up Roses (2015)

==== EPs ====
- Guilty Pleas (2013)
- Anything to Anyone (2014)

=== As producer ===
==== Albums ====
- Humanimals, Grand Ole Party (2007, DH Records)
- The Devil's Made a New Friend, Jarrod Gorbel (2010, ℗Jarrod Gorbel)
- The Echo Sessions, Vol. 1, Rachel Zevita (2013, Mag-Nett Records)
- Take the Corners Gently, Steady Holiday (2021, ℗Steady Holiday)

==== EPs ====
- Get with the Program, Near Tears (2021, ℗Near Tears)

== Selected filmography ==
- Once and Again – (2000)
- 3rd Rock from the Sun (1997–1999)
- Buffy the Vampire Slayer – (1999)
- Boy Meets World – (1994–1998)
- Smart Guy – (1997)
- Public Morals – (1996)
- Last Resort – (1996)
- Driven – (1996)
- Melrose Place – (1996)
- Salute Your Shorts – (1992)
- The Wonder Years – (1990–1991)
- His & Hers – (1990)
- My Two Dads – (1989)
- It's Garry Shandling's Show – (1988)
- Family Ties – (1987)
- Highway to Heaven – (1987)
