= The Execution of All Things (song) =

Single by Rilo Kiley

from the album The Execution of All Things
- B-side: "Emotional (Until Crickets Guide You Back)"; "After Hours"
- Released: September 22, 2003
- Recorded: March 2002
- Studio: Presto! (Lincoln)
- Genre: Indie pop
- Length: 4:13
- Label: Saddle Creek
- Songwriters: Jenny Lewis; Blake Sennett; Ben Boyer
- Producer: Mike Mogis

Rilo Kiley singles chronology
"Science vs. Romance" (2002)	"The Execution of All Things" (2003)	"Portions for Foxes" (2004)

"The Execution of All Things" is the title track of Los Angeles-based indie rock band Rilo Kiley's second album. It was released as a single on September 22, 2003, via Saddle Creek. Rilo Kiley's cover of The Velvet Underground's "After Hours" appears as a b-side, as does a new track called "Emotional (Until Crickets Guide You Back)". The single and its b-sides are available to download on the iTunes Store.

== Critical reception ==
Rolling Stone called the song "a checklist of modern destruction", praising Lewis' "girlish, ethereal voice that makes the band's brutal vision all the more startling."

== Track listings and formats ==
- 7" vinyl and CD single
1. "The Execution of All Things" – 4:10
2. "Emotional (Until Crickets Guide You Back)" – 3:52
3. "After Hours" – 2:57

== Credits and personnel ==
- Jenny Lewis – lead vocals
- Blake Sennett – guitar
- Pierre De Reeder – bass guitar
- Jason Boesel – drums
- Mike Mogis – production, recording
- A. J. Mogis – mixing
- Doug Van Sloun – mastering
- Andy Ward – artwork
- Jadon Ulrich – artwork layout
