= RVCA =

American clothing company

- Type: Subsidiary
- Industry: Retail
- Founded: 2001; 25 years ago
- Founder: Pat Tenore and Conan Hayes
- Headquarters: Orange County, CA, United States
- Products: Clothing
- Parent: Authentic Brands Group
- Website: www.rvca.com

RVCA is an Orange County, California–based clothing company owned by Authentic Brands Group.

RVCA (pronounced “rew-kah”) is an Orange County, California–based clothing and lifestyle brand whose identity brings together Southern California surf and skate culture with contemporary art, music, fashion, and combat sports. Its Artist Network Program (ANP) provides a continuing platform for established and emerging artists alongside the brand’s athletes and advocates. RVCA remains active under Authentic Brands Group and is operated through licensing and distribution partners in different markets.

== Etymology ==
The name RVCA is pronounced “rew-kah,” rather than as the individual letters R-V-C-A. The logotype for RVCA portrays the letter A without a crossbar, resembling an uppercase lambda (Λ). The name resembles the Greek ρούχα (uppercase: ΡΟὙΧΑ; [ˈru xa]) which means 'clothes' in English. The RVCA logo is based on the two chevrons, the V & the A, representing the brand's ethos "The Balance of Opposites" as stated by RVCA founder PM Tenore.

== History ==
RVCA was founded in 2001 by Pat Tenore and Conan Hayes, a professional surfer from Hawaii. Billabong purchased RVCA in July 2010, and then Boardriders acquired Billabong in 2018, taking ownership of RVCA, Element, Von Zipper, and XCEL.

RVCA’s published brand history dates the establishment of the Artist Network Program to 2002, the launch of ANP Quarterly to 2005, its MMA debut with B.J. Penn to 2006, and both the Erin Wasson collaboration and the launch of RVCA Sport to 2009. It also records RVCA as winning the Surf Industry Members Association Men’s Brand of the Year award in 2010, 2011, 2012, 2013, and 2014. At the time of the Billabong acquisition, RVCA was described as operating across skateboarding, surfing, fashion, mixed martial arts, art, and music. Its products were sold through fashion boutiques, surf and skate shops, Nordstrom, and PacSun; the brand ranked sixth among apparel brands in an ActionWatch panel of approximately 250 boardsport retailers. Billabong said RVCA would retain its identity and creative direction under founder Pat Tenore while gaining access to Billabong’s sourcing, supply-chain, distribution, and financing infrastructure. Authentic Brands Group acquired the Boardriders portfolio, including RVCA, in September 2023. Authentic then appointed Liberated Brands as RVCA’s U.S. and Canadian retail and e-commerce operator and as a wholesale licensee for several product categories.

On February 2, 2025, Liberated Brands, owner of RVCA retail stores in the US, filed for Chapter 11 bankruptcy protection, listing assets and liabilities between $100 million and $500 million. The company announced the closure of all remaining RVCA locations in the US, with liquidation sales beginning a week before the bankruptcy.

The bankruptcy filing was made by Liberated Brands, an operating company and licensee, rather than by RVCA itself. RVCA remained owned by Authentic Brands Group, which transferred the North American wholesale license to Ethos Brands, an affiliate of Quetico Lifestyle Brands. Liberated announced that its 100-plus U.S. retail locations would close, while the brands were transitioned to new operating partners.

== Culture ==
RVCA is associated with skateboard, surf culture, Brazilian jiu-jitsu (BJJ), and MMA. The company sponsored skateboard and surf teams. They also sponsored prominent BJJ competitors and prominent MMA fighters. RVCA clothing is found in skateboard/surf shops and numerous other shops.

Rather than identifying with a single sport, RVCA was conceived as a platform joining multiple subcultures. Founder Pat Tenore described its original concept as integrating different subcultures within one lifestyle brand, while Billabong chief executive Derek O’Neill said in 2010 that RVCA was not defined by any one sport or culture. This crossover was also reflected in its distribution: contemporary fashion boutiques, department stores, surf shops, skate shops, and mall retailers carried RVCA at the same time.

Because of its art focus, RVCA was also associated with the street graffiti subculture. RVCA was involved with various contemporary art galleries such as KNOWN Gallery.

The Artist Network Program is an ongoing RVCA initiative designed to showcase both accomplished and lesser-known artists and provide support for their creative development. The program has incorporated artists into collections and supported exhibitions, performances, and cultural events, placing art at the center of the brand rather than treating it as an occasional product collaboration. RVCA also published ANP Quarterly, an arts and culture magazine focused on art and community rather than clothing products. RVCA described the publication as free of advertising and distributed internationally through galleries, bookstores, clothing stores, and record shops. In 2008, model and designer Erin Wasson presented a Spring 2009 collection for RVCA during New York Fashion Week. The collection began a planned three-year collaboration and combined California beach culture with Manhattan streetwear, extending RVCA into the higher-end contemporary fashion market.

== RVCA Training Center ==
Because of its Brazilian jiu-jitsu and MMA focus, RVCA founder Pat Tenore (who holds a black belt in Brazilian jiu-jitsu) built a BJJ/MMA gym known as The RVCA Training Center. The training facility was located at RVCA HQ Costa Mesa, California, and the Head Coach was Jason Parillo. The training center closed in September 2023.

The VA Sport Training Center opened in 2009 to support B.J. Penn’s training camp for his UFC 101 title defense. Located inside RVCA’s Costa Mesa headquarters, it combined strength-and-conditioning equipment with grappling mats, striking bags, a boxing ring, and an MMA cage. Jason Parillo taught striking at the facility, while RVCA Sport supported athletes in boxing, Brazilian jiu-jitsu, and mixed martial arts, including Penn and jiu-jitsu competitors Rafael and Guilherme Mendes and Marcus Almeida.

=== Affiliated people ===
==== MMA ====
- B.J. Penn
- Michael Bisping
- Cris Cyborg
- Rafael dos Anjos
- Rose Namajunas
- Tito Ortiz
- Luke Rockhold
- Vitor Belfort
- Marlon Vera
- Mackenzie Dern
- Gilbert Burns
- Jalin Turner
- Sean Strickland

==== Brazilian Jiu Jitsu ====
- Lucas Leite
- Marcus Almeida
- Guilherme Mendes
- Rafael Mendes
- Keenan Cornelius
- Jackson Sousa dos Santos
- Kade Ruotolo
- Tye Ruotolo
- Patrick Chancey

==== Boxing ====
- Seniesa Estrada

== Notable sponsored artists and sportspeople ==
Among the artists sponsored by RVCA as part of the Artist Network Program (ANP) are Mark OBlow, Mark Mothersbaugh, Barry McGee, C. R. Stecyk, III, David Choe, Kelsey Brookes, KRK Ryden, Matt Gordon, Marlon Vera, and Tommy Guerrero.

=== Past surf team members ===
- Kala Alexander
- Makua Rothman

=== Past skate team members ===
- Andrew Reynolds
- Curren Caples
- Kevin "Spanky" Long
- Christian Hosoi
- Mark Suciu
- Evan Mock

=== Past MMA fighters ===
- Mackenzie Dern
- Rose Namajunas
- Fedor Emelianenko
- Aaron Pico
- Luke Rockhold
- B.J. Penn
- Gilbert Burns
- Marlon Vera

=== E-Sports ===
- Summit1g
- Relentless Gaming

=== Chefs ===
- Matty Matheson

== See also ==
- Mixed martial arts clothing
