= Maybe This Christmas =

2002 compilation album by various artists

Compilation album by various artists
- Released: November 5, 2002
- Genres: Holiday, international, pop rock
- Length: 41:39
- Label: Nettwerk
- Producer: Darin Harmon (executive)

Maybe This Christmas chronology
Maybe This Christmas (2002)	Maybe This Christmas Too? (2003)

Maybe This Christmas is a holiday compilation album released in November 2002 through Nettwerk Records featuring contemporary musicians performing both classic and original Christmas songs. The album, named by Ron Sexsmith, is the first in a series of three holiday compilations released through the record label between 2002 and 2004. A portion of the proceeds from the sales of each album went to Toys for Tots, a charity supported by the United States Marine Corps. Most of the tracks exclusive to Maybe This Christmas were recorded just a few months prior to its release. The album's cover art was designed by artist Paul Frank, creator of Julius the pictured "wide-mouth monkey". Critical reception of the compilation was mixed, with reviewers often complimenting or criticizing select tracks. In the United States, the album reached a peak position of number thirty-eight on Billboard's Top Holiday Albums chart.

== Background and composition ==
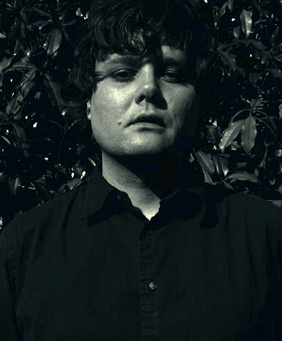
Ron Sexsmith named the compilation series and contributed the title track.

Maybe This Christmas is the first in a series of three consecutive holiday compilation albums released through Nettwerk. Maybe This Christmas Too? and Maybe This Christmas Tree were released in October 2003 and October 2004, respectively. The series was named by Ron Sexsmith, who contributed the title track to the compilation. A portion of the proceeds from the sales of each album went to Toys for Tots, a charity supported by the United States Marine Corps. Maybe This Christmas contains thirteen "rock-oriented" tracks recorded by various artists. Most of the tracks exclusive to the album were recorded just a few months prior to its release. Allmusic's MacKenzie Wilson dubbed the compilation an "album suited for those twenty-somethings searching for [their] not-so-typical Christmas collection." The cover art was designed by artist Paul Frank, creator of Julius the "illustrated, wide-mouth monkey".

The album opens with Phantom Planet's "sweet rock romp" rendition of Felix Bernard and Richard B. Smith's "Winter Wonderland". Sexsmith's title track is less than two minutes in length and has a shuffling beat. "Have Yourself a Merry Little Christmas" (Ralph Blane, Hugh Martin) features a downtempo, "jazz-like" solo piano performance by Chris Martin of Coldplay. Tracks exclusive to the album include Vanessa Carlton's piano-driven rendition of the traditional song "Greensleeves" as well as Bright Eyes' cover of "Blue Christmas" (Bill Hayes, Jay Johnson); others include Sense Field's version of John Lennon and Yoko Ono's "Happy Xmas (War Is Over)" and "What a Year for a New Year" by Dan Wilson, lead singer of the rock band Semisonic.

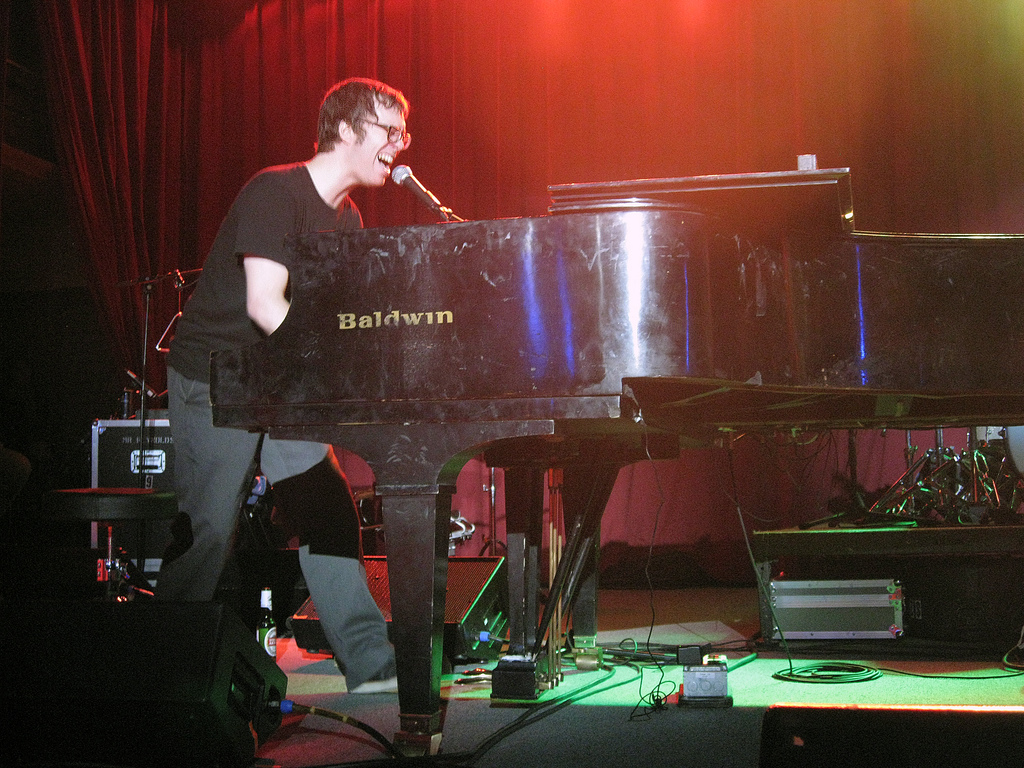
Ben Folds performing in 2009; one reviewer called "Bizarre Christmas Incident" the album's "funniest" track.

Jimmy Eat World's "12/23/95", described by The Austin Chronicle's Christopher Gray as "serious emo" and The New York Times' Kelefa Sanneh as a "gentle ballad of apology", previously appeared on the band's 1999 album Clarity. The song title and date refer to Little Christmas Eve, the traditional day on which Norwegians decorate Christmas trees. Jack Johnson incorporates an "upbeat street-corner" shuffle into his version of "Rudolph the Red Nosed Reindeer" (Johnny Marks, Robert L. May), just over two minutes in length. The traditional song "God Rest Ye Merry Gentlemen" is performed as a duet by the Barenaked Ladies and Sarah McLachlan. Following is a string of original songs, including "Bizarre Christmas Incident" by Ben Folds, "What a Year for a New Year" by Dan Wilson and Neil Finn's "Sweet Secret Peace". "Winter Wonderland," "Have Yourself a Merry Little Christmas" and "Bizarre Christmas Incident" were recorded previously for fans but had not been released commercially. The closing track, "Snow" (Archibald Lampman, Loreena McKennitt) was performed by McKennitt and has been described as a "haunting, orchestral new-age hymn that could fit nicely into a midnight Mass."

== Reception ==
Professional ratings
Review scores
Source	Rating
Allmusic	3/5 stars
Entertainment Weekly	B
The Phoenix	2.5/4 stars

Maybe This Christmas received mixed critical reception. Many reviewers complimented or criticized select tracks, though Jimmy Eat World's "12/23/95" received the most praise. Allmusic's MacKenzie Wilson awarded the album three out of five stars and described it as a "solid holiday effort" for both "casual and die-hard music fans". Wilson considered "12/23/95" the album's standout track and wrote that performances by Bright Eyes, Loreena McKennitt, Sense Field, and Dan Wilson provided traditional carols with a "fresh face" along with their own "dash of coolness". She also complimented Coldplay's rendition of "Have Yourself a Merry Little Christmas", calling it as "endearing" as the original, and thought Sarah McLachlan's "God Rest Ye Merry Gentlemen" was "playfully charming". Christopher Gray of The Austin Chronicle considered "Blue Christmas" the best and "Bizarre Christmas Incident" the "funniest" track on the compilation.

Chris Willman of Entertainment Weekly gave the album a "B" rating and called it a "mixed bag". He described performances by Vanessa Carlton and Bright Eyes as "painful" but also complimented the Barenaked Ladies and McLachlan for their collaboration. Willman considered Wilson's "What a Year for a New Year" the stand-out track of the album. Annie Zaleski of The Phoenix rated the album 2.5 out of 4 stars, calling some of the collection "gorgeous and alluring" but most of it "subdued". Zaleski complimented the title track but criticized performances by Coldplay and Bright Eyes, the latter for its "unsteady, wobbly twang". Zaleski and Kelefa Sanneh of The New York Times also praised "12/23/95". Zaleski concluded: "Not exactly your traditional take on traditional holiday fare, but a pleasant alternative to all the muzak you have to put up with this time of year."

== Track listing ==
No.	Title	Writer(s)	Performed By	Length
1.	"Winter Wonderland"	Felix Bernard, Richard B. Smith	Phantom Planet	2:47
2.	"Maybe This Christmas"	Ron Sexsmith	Ron Sexsmith	1:53
3.	"Have Yourself a Merry Little Christmas"	Ralph Blane, Hugh Martin	Coldplay	2:22
4.	"Greensleeves"	traditional	Vanessa Carlton	3:35
5.	"Blue Christmas"	Bill Hayes, Jay Johnson	Bright Eyes	2:21
6.	"Happy Xmas (War Is Over)"	John Lennon, Yoko Ono	Sense Field	3:29
7.	"12/23/95"	Jimmy Eat World	Jimmy Eat World	3:37
8.	"Rudolph the Red Nosed Reindeer"	Johnny Marks	Jack Johnson	2:09
9.	"God Rest Ye Merry Gentlemen"	traditional	Barenaked Ladies and Sarah McLachlan	3:30
10.	"Bizarre Christmas Incident"	Ben Folds	Ben Folds	2:24
11.	"What a Year for a New Year"	Dan Wilson	Dan Wilson	4:06
12.	"Sweet Secret Peace"	Neil Finn, Michael Leunig	Neil Finn	3:50
13.	"Snow"	Archibald Lampman, Loreena McKennitt	Loreena McKennitt	5:36
Total length:				41:39

Track listing adapted from Allmusic.

== Personnel ==
- Simon Askew – engineer, mixing
- Barenaked Ladies – arranger, primary artist
- Felix Bernard – composer
- Ralph Blane – composer
- Bright Eyes – primary artist
- Vanessa Carlton – arranger, piano, primary artist, vocals
- Mark Chalecki – mastering
- Coldplay – primary artist
- Jim Creeggan – bass
- Chris Evenson – mixing, producer
- Mike Farrell – trumpet
- Neil Finn – composer, piano, primary artist, vibraphone, vocals
- Ben Folds – composer, instrumentation, primary artist
- Lisa Germano – violin
- Darin Harmon – executive producer
- Bill Hayes – composer
- Matt Hensley – accordion
- Jimmy Eat World – composer, primary artist
- Jack Johnson – guitar, primary artist, vocals
- Jay Johnson – composer
- Brad Kern – engineer, mixing
- Don Kerr – backing vocals, drums, xylophone
- Archibald Lampman – composer
- John Lennon – composer
- Johnny Marks – composer
- Hugh Martin – composer
- Robert L. May – composer
- Loreena McKennitt – composer, harp, primary artist, tin whistle, vocals
- Sarah McLachlan – primary artist, vocals
- Marco Migliari – engineer
- Yoko Ono – composer
- Steven Page – vocals
- Phantom Planet – primary artist, producer
- Ed Robertson – vocals
- Andy Rogers – producer
- Michael C. Ross – mixing
- Sense Field – primary Artist
- Ron Sexsmith – composer, guitar, organ, primary artist, vocals
- Richard B. Smith – composer
- Sebastian Steinberg – bass
- Tyler Stewart
- Tom Weir – producer
- Dan Wilson – composer, mixing, primary artist, producer

Credits adapted from Allmusic.

== Charts ==
In the United States, Maybe This Christmas reached a peak position of number thirty-eight on Billboard's Top Holiday Albums chart.

== See also ==
- Paul Frank Industries
