= Suzie Ungerleider =

Canadian musician

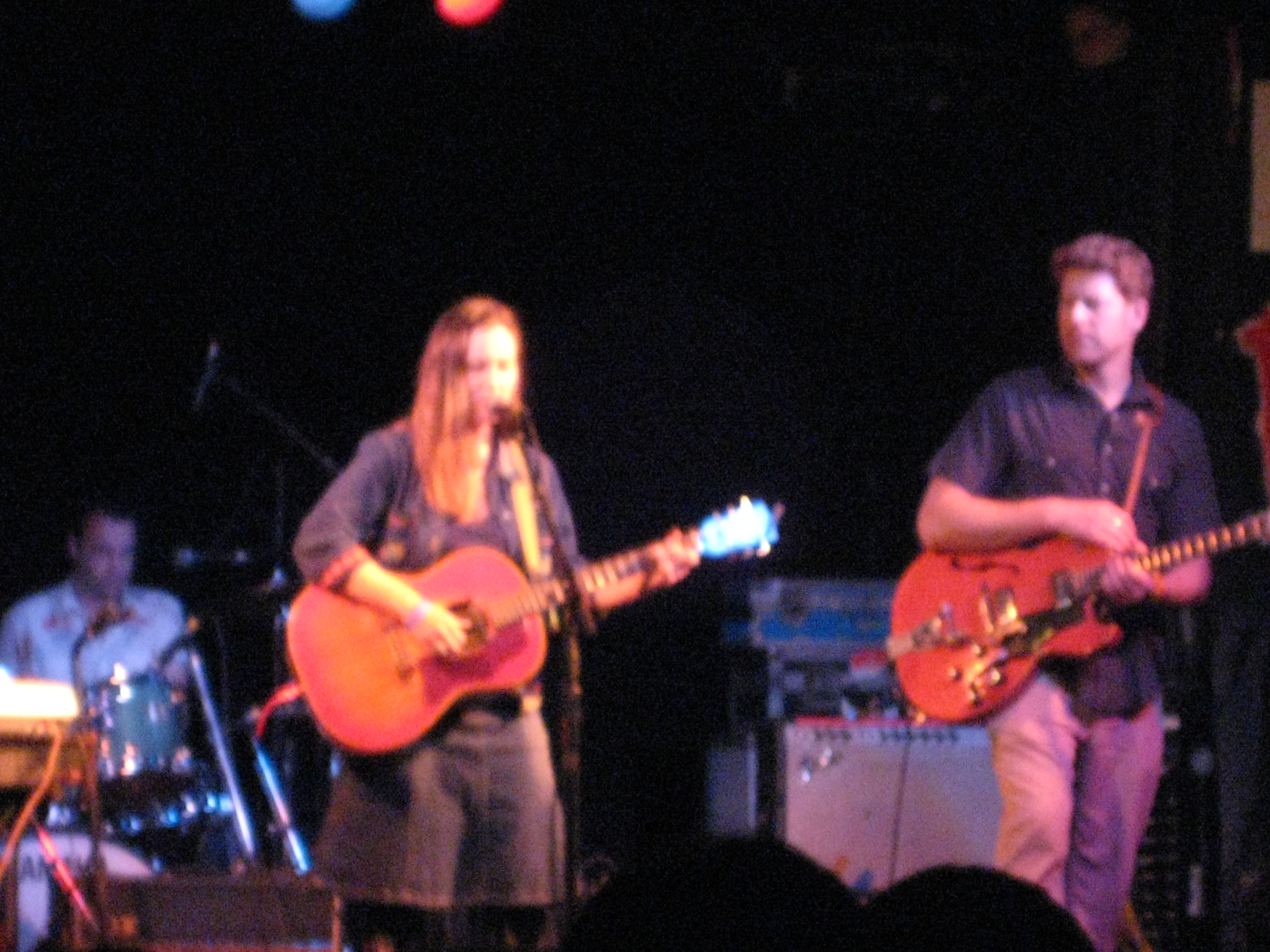
- Suzie Ungerleider performing at the 2007 NXNE festival

Background information
- Also known as: Oh Susanna (formerly known as)
- Born: Suzanne Elizabeth Ungerleider; Northampton, Massachusetts, US
- Genres: Alternative country
- Occupation: Singer-songwriter
- Instruments: Vocals, guitar
- Years active: 1997–present
- Label: MVKA
- Website: suzieungerleider.com

Suzanne Elizabeth Ungerleider, who formerly wrote and performed under the name Oh Susanna, is an American-Canadian alternative country singer-songwriter from Vancouver, British Columbia.

== Career ==
Ungerleider chose to perform under the name Oh Susanna, alluding to the classic American folk song "Oh! Susanna", rather than her given name as a means of keeping her private and professional lives separate. She initially wanted to be a somewhat theatrical performer. "I had this notion, okay I'm going to try and wear these vintage clothes and I play this old Stella guitar, which is like this mail order guitar that blues guys used to play," said Ungerleider. She played her first show under the name Oh Susanna at the Railway Club in Vancouver in July 1995, and released her first independent recording, a seven-song EP, in 1997. At approximately this time, she decided to relocate to Toronto after attending Blue Rodeo's Stardust Picnic festival. In 1999, she released her full-length debut, Johnstown, and toured Canada and the United States with fellow musicians Veda Hille and Kinnie Starr, in what they dubbed the "Scrappy Bitch Tour".

At the 19th Genie Awards in 1999, she won the Genie Award for Best Original Song, for her song "River Blue" from the film The Fishing Trip.

She has since released eight more albums, Sleepy Little Sailor (2001), Oh Susanna (2003), Short Stories (2007), Soon the Birds (2011), Namedropper (2014), A Girl in Teen City (2017) and Decemberly(2018) a holiday EP with Michael Johnston. Her recordings have featured guest musicians Luke Doucet, Justin Rutledge, Burke Carroll, Bazil Donovan and Jim Cuddy of Blue Rodeo, Ruth Moody of The Wailin' Jennys, and members of Weeping Tile.

Of the inspiration for her songs, Ungerleider has said "A lot of that stuff comes from other people who have told me things. Some of its totally made up". She also says that her Western Canadian upbringing has inspired some of her lyrics.

In 2012, Ungerleider announced that she intended to obtain Canadian citizenship. Plans to begin recording a new album were sidetracked in 2013 when she was diagnosed with breast cancer. However, she has undergone treatment for that, and released the album, Namedropper on October 7, 2014.

Her next project A Girl in Teen City was released in 2017. The album is an autobiographical depiction of herself in her youth "in search of identity, falling in love, getting drunk, having her heart broken, hanging out with friends in bedrooms, basements and parking lots, sneaking into shows in burnt out warehouses, watching the waves, walking home over bridges and railroad tracks in all that endless rain."

In 2019, Ungerleider marked the 20th anniversary of her critically acclaimed debut album Johnstown by releasing a remastered version of the album on Record Store Day (April 13). In 2020, she released a deluxe edition reissue of her 2001 album Sleepy Little Sailor.

In 2021, she announced that she was retiring the Oh Susanna stage name, after learning more about the complicated racial history of the song "Oh! Susanna".

== Personal life ==
Ungerleider was born in Northampton, Massachusetts but raised in Vancouver. Her father, Charles, is a professor at Vancouver's University of British Columbia. Her mother, Mary, is a documentary film editor

In 2019 she moved back to Vancouver where she resides with husband/drummer Cam Giroux and their child who was born in 2005.

== Discography ==
=== Studio albums ===
As Oh Susanna

- 1997 – Oh Susanna (EP)
- 1999 – Johnstown
- 2001 – Sleepy Little Sailor
- 2003 – Oh Susanna
- 2007 – Short Stories
- 2011 – Soon the Birds
- 2014 – Namedropper
- 2017 – A Girl in Teen City
- 2018 – Decemberly (with Michael Johnston) (EP)

As Suzie Ungerleider

- 2021 – My Name Is Suzie Ungerleider
- 2025 – Among the Evergreens

=== Contributions ===
- The Fishing Trip (film) (1998, Mongrel Media) – "River Blue"
- Maybe This Christmas Too? (2003, Nettwerk) – "Go Tell It On the Mountain"
- Great Canadian Song Quest (2009, CBC Records/iTunes) – "Tough City"
