= Under the Blacklight =

2007 studio album by Rilo Kiley

Studio album by Rilo Kiley
- Released: August 17, 2007
- Recorded: Summer 2006–spring 2007
- Genres: Indie pop, indie rock
- Length: 37:30
- Label: Warner Bros.
- Producers: Rilo Kiley, Jason Lader, Mike Elizondo

Rilo Kiley chronology
More Adventurous (2004)	Under the Blacklight (2007)	Rkives (2013)

Singles from Under the Blacklight
- 1. "The Moneymaker" Released: August 13, 2007; 2. "Breakin' Up" Released: May 2, 2008

Under the Blacklight is the fourth and final studio album released by American alternative rock band Rilo Kiley. It was released on August 20, 2007, in the United Kingdom - three years and three days after the release of their third album, More Adventurous. Warner Bros. Records released the album one day later in the United States. "Silver Lining" was No. 27 on Rolling Stone's list of the 100 Best Songs of 2007.

== Album history ==
The album marks the return of the band following individual solo projects. On January 24, 2006, Jenny Lewis released Rabbit Fur Coat while Blake Sennett released Sun, Sun, Sun with The Elected.

The album was produced by the band with Jason Lader and Mike Elizondo. The first single to be released from the album was "The Moneymaker". The second single was "Silver Lining".

Several tracks from Blacklight were leaked in advance of the album's official release date. On August 17, 2007, the band started streaming the whole album on their MySpace page.

The album's jewel case is tinted purple, reminiscent of a blacklight. The album's covers and inlays were designed by Lewis and Pierre de Reeder, with photography by Autumn de Wilde. The liner notes do not feature any song lyrics.

The band's first official major label debut features a number of guests musicians, including Jackson Browne, Alex Greenwald of Phantom Planet and James Valentine and Mickey Madden from Maroon 5. However, the album credits do not state on which songs the guests appear.

Under the Blacklight debuted at number 22 on the U.S. Billboard 200, selling about 27,000 copies in its first week. As of December 2012, sales in the United States have exceeded 186,000 copies, according to Nielsen SoundScan.

On September 25, 2007, Rilo Kiley appeared on Jimmy Kimmel Live! to perform "Dreamworld". "Dreamworld" was the first Rilo Kiley song to become popular in Russia. In November 2007 it was added to the playlist of Maximum, one of the most popular stations in Russia.

"Breakin' Up" was heard at the end of the Grey's Anatomy season 4 episode "Forever Young". "The MoneyMaker" was used as the background music in promotional spots for Fox Network's "Canterbury's Law" and a 2009 Carl's Jr. ad featuring Audrina Patridge. "15" was included in the "Clearance Sale" show of Season 3 of Bob Dylan's Theme Time Radio in April 2009.

== Critical reception ==
Professional ratings
Aggregate scores
Source	Rating
Metacritic	71/100
Review scores
Source	Rating
AllMusic	3.5/5 stars
The A.V. Club	A
Entertainment Weekly	B−
The Guardian	3/5 stars
MSN Music (Consumer Guide)	A
NME	5/10
Pitchfork	5.1/10
Rolling Stone	4/5 stars
Spin	4/5 stars
Uncut	5/5 stars

Blacklight tells a dark story. It is "an album written about Los Angeles' sketchy side... of characters starving for fame and fortune". At Metacritic, which assigns a normalized rating out of 100 to reviews from mainstream critics, the album received an average score of 71, based on 32 reviews, which indicates "generally favorable reviews". The album received many Fleetwood Mac comparisons. Critics praised the band's move into a newer sound, with Rolling Stone calling it "yet even more adventurous" (referring to the band's 2004 album More Adventurous).

This album was #8 on Rolling Stone's list of the Top 50 Albums of 2007.

The "January/February 2008" issue of Blender Magazine named Under the Blacklight the tenth best album of 2007, referring to it as "an album of classically sleek, apocalyptic '70s L.A. coke-rock, in the fine Fleetwood Mac and Steely Dan tradition."

== Track listing ==
All songs written by Jenny Lewis, except where noted.

No.	Title	Writer(s)	Producer(s)	Length
1.	"Silver Lining"		Jason Lader, Rilo Kiley	3:35
2.	"Close Call"		Jason Lader, Rilo Kiley	3:20
3.	"The Moneymaker"		Jason Lader, Rilo Kiley	2:51
4.	"Breakin' Up"	Blake Sennett, Lewis	Jason Lader, Rilo Kiley	3:37
5.	"Under the Blacklight"		Mike Elizondo	3:33
6.	"Dreamworld"	Sennett, Morgan Nagler	Jason Lader, Rilo Kiley	4:43
7.	"Dejalo"	Lewis, Johnathan Rice	Mike Elizondo	3:16
8.	"15"		Mike Elizondo	2:50
9.	"Smoke Detector"		Mike Elizondo	2:58
10.	"The Angels Hung Around"		Mike Elizondo	3:03
11.	"Give a Little Love"		Mike Elizondo	3:41
Total length:				37:30

== Personnel ==
- Jenny Lewis – vocals, keyboards, guitar
- Blake Sennett – guitar, keyboards, vocals (lead on "Dreamworld")
- Pierre de Reeder – bass guitar, guitar, backing vocals
- Jason Boesel – drums, percussion
- Danny Cooksey – backing vocals

== Charts ==
Chart (2007)	Peak position
Belgian Albums (Ultratop Flanders)	86
Canadian Albums (Nielsen SoundScan)	66
Irish Albums (IRMA)	17
Norwegian Albums (VG-lista)	15
Scottish Albums (Official Charts)	30
Swedish Albums (Sverigetopplistan)	52
UK Albums (Official Charts)	34
US Billboard 200	22
US Indie Store Album Sales (Billboard)	3
US Top Alternative Albums (Billboard)	5
US Top Rock Albums (Billboard)	6

Chart (2023)	Peak position
Hungarian Physical Albums (MAHASZ)	24

== Release history ==
Region	Date
Netherlands	August 17, 2007
United Kingdom	August 20, 2007
United States	August 21, 2007
Germany	August 24, 2007

== Credits ==
All songs published by Deprecious Music/Wonderful Pony Music/Big Blue Boat Music/BB Lindstrom (all BMI) except:
"Dreamworld" published by Deprecious Music/Wonderful Pony Music/Big Blue Boat Music/BB Lindstrom/Morgan Nagler (all BMI)
"Dejalo" published by Deprecious Music/Wonderful Pony Music/Big Blue Boat Music/BB Lindstrom (all BMI)/Point Longstreet Publishing (ASCAP)

- Producers – Rilo Kiley, Jason Lader, Mike Elizondo
- Engineers – Adam Hawkins, Brent Arrowood, Michael Bloom, Jedidiah Burtoft, Scott McKay Gibson, Danny Kalb, Bill Mims & Jason Mott
- Mixing – Jason Lader, Adam Hawkins
- Recording – Jason Lader, Adam Hawkins, Paul Dieter
- Mastering - Brian Gardner
