= Green Christmas (Barenaked Ladies song) =

2000 song performed by Barenaked Ladies

Song by Barenaked Ladies

from the album Dr. Seuss' How the Grinch Stole Christmas: Original Motion Picture Soundtrack
- Released: November 7, 2000
- Recorded: 2000
- Genre: Christmas, rock
- Length: 2:35
- Label: Interscope
- Songwriter(s): Steven Page and Ed Robertson

"Green Christmas" is a Christmas song by the Barenaked Ladies from the soundtrack for the 2000 film How The Grinch Stole Christmas!. It was later re-recorded as a studio acoustic version for the Christmas compilation Maybe This Christmas Too? in 2003, and re-recorded again for the band's own holiday album, Barenaked for the Holidays, released in 2004. The song was performed on several television appearances promoting the album.
