= Grand Ole Party =

American rock band (2005–2009)

- Origin: Santa Cruz, California
- Years active: 2005–2009
- Members: Kristin Gundred; John Paul Labno; Michael Krechnyak

Grand Ole Party was a three-piece band formed in Santa Cruz, California consisting of singer-drummer Kristin Gundred, guitarist John Paul Labno and bassist Michael Krechnyak. They began recording their debut album shortly after moving to San Diego, California in mid-2006, relocating from the San Francisco area. The three met while attending college at University of California, Santa Cruz.

Their debut album, Humanimals, was produced by Blake Sennett of Rilo Kiley and was released on DH Records in January 2007. The band opened for Rilo Kiley on their tour from September to November 2007 and for Rogue Wave in spring 2008, as well as for Yeah Yeah Yeahs in spring 2009.

They were voted "Best Alternative" band in the 2007 San Diego Music Awards. In the January 2008 issue of San Diego Magazine they were chosen as one of the "50 People to Watch in 2008"

On 2009, Grand Ole Party was rumored to have broken up, which they did.. Kristin Gundred went on to perform as "Dee Dee" in the Sub Pop-signed band Dum Dum Girls. John Paul Labno has started new bands The Hot Moon and Mohammed Qiang.

A poster of the band appears on the wall in a scene of the 2009 film Life During Wartime.

In August 2011, it was announced that DH records would be releasing an album entitled Under Our Skin on August 30. The 12 songs album was recorded in 2009 before the band broke up, and was produced by Ben H. Allen.
