= The Execution of All Things =

Studio album by Rilo Kiley
- Released: October 1, 2002
- Recorded: March 2002
- Studio: Presto! (Lincoln)
- Genre: Indie rock
- Length: 47:44
- Label: Saddle Creek
- Producer: Mike Mogis

Rilo Kiley chronology
| Take Offs and Landings (2001) | The Execution of All Things (2002) | More Adventurous (2004) |

Singles from The Execution of All Things
- 1. "The Execution of All Things" Released: September 22, 2003

The Execution of All Things is the second studio album released by Los Angeles-based indie pop band Rilo Kiley in 2002. The album was released by Saddle Creek Records in Omaha, Nebraska and was recorded at Presto! in Lincoln, Nebraska.

== Background and recording ==
During their tour supporting Take Offs and Landings, Rilo Kiley began conceptualizing their second album. While performing in San Francisco, the band met Tim Kasher of Cursive, who was touring with his side project, the Good Life. Following their meeting, Rilo Kiley accompanied Kasher to Omaha, Nebraska, where he introduced them to Presto! Recording Studios, operated by Mike and A.J. Mogis. At the time, the Mogis brothers were establishing Omaha, along with Saddle Creek Records, as centers of early 2000s "Omaha Sound".

In a 2002 interview, Jenny Lewis noted that the band had already been fans of the Omaha music scene, having purchased Bright Eyes’ Fevers and Mirrors the previous year. Reflecting on the experience, Lewis commented that this album more accurately captured the band’s live energy compared to their debut album, Take Offs and Landings, which was recorded at home. “With Take Offs and Landings, we were still learning how to record and perform,” Lewis said. “This one better reflects how we play live.” The recording sessions took place over several weeks in March 2002, with Lewis describing the studio environment as cold and alcohol-laden, which influenced the emotional tone of the album's performances.

== Music and lyrics ==
Expanding on their previous sound, which mostly incorporated guitars, vocals, percussion, and pianos, the album contains electronic samplings mixed into the songs in a rather unusual and displaced-sounding way. Also, unlike their previous tracks, the lyrics to the songs on Execution are very wordy and read like prose. Musically, the record has a very sunny disposition, with bouncing bass lines and catchy melodies complemented by lead singer Jenny Lewis's vocal style. Still, the upbeat music is contrasted by the often dark and gloomy subject matter that the lyrics reference.

The album is strung together by a song broken into pieces that trail between several tracks. "And That's How I Choose to Remember It" tells the story of Lewis' childhood and her parents' divorce. This theme is visited throughout the album, lyrically filled with childhood recollections of loss, displacement, anger, and hopelessness.

The songs "So Long" and "Three Hopeful Thoughts" feature lead vocals by Blake Sennett. Lewis sings lead on all other tracks. "With Arms Outstretched" played in the final moments of the series finale of Weeds, just as it had in the pilot; the song also features in the first episode of the miniseries Looking For Alaska. "A Better Son/Daughter" was played in the trailer for the first season of the Netflix original series Orange Is the New Black. It is also featured at the end of Hannah Gadsby's 2018 Netflix special Nanette.

== Critical reception ==
Professional ratings
Aggregate scores
| Source | Rating |
|---|---|
| Metacritic | 80/100 |
Review scores
| Source | Rating |
| AllMusic | 3.5/5 stars |
| Alternative Press | 4/5 stars |
| Blender | 4/5 stars |
| Drowned in Sound | 8/10 |
| Entertainment Weekly | A− |
| Los Angeles Times | 3/4 stars |
| MSN Music (Consumer Guide) | A |
| Pitchfork | 7.5/10 |
| Q | 3/5 stars |
| Uncut | 4/5 stars |

Critics received the album positively upon release. Pitchfork praised the album's music and lyrics — saying "the words here are descriptive and articulate, but gracefully rendered" — writing that the album surpassed all Rilo Kiley's prior work.

=== Legacy and impact ===
Anne Hathaway called the track "A Better Son/Daughter" "a life-changing song" for helping to improve her mental health during a difficult period of her life in 2009.

Critics again celebrated the album at its 20th anniversary in 2022. Stereogum called Better Son/Daughter a "towering, monumental achievement" and praised the interconnected nature of all the tracks on the album. Paste Magazine noted "the album's continued reverberation in a new generation of contemporary artists and listeners" and praised its treatment of mental illness, trauma, and gender. Andrew Sacher of BrooklynVegan wrote of Things' influence on 2010s emo music. He saw it impact the genre's lyrical focus for that era, helping it move from unrequited love to mental health. Paste's Natalie Marlin recognized that same influence carries into the future of indie rock as well. She saw how well the album fit in a culture "more prone than ever to accommodate piercing, honest lyricism about issues of mental health," which was partly driven by its impact.

In the years since its release, Things has impacted various musicians. In a 2013 interview, indie rock musician Waxahatchee revealed that she had bought the album "when it had just come out" and "listened to [it] so many times." In a Talkhouse essay released the following year, she wrote of feeling "a massive surge of enthusiasm and revelation" when listening and realized "that I really wanted to make music myself." She singled out the album's "musical theater-like vocal glory" and its lyrics' "airtight incisiveness" as inspiring to her. Harmony Tividad, bassist for former duo Girlpool, called opening track "The Good That Won't Come Out" one of her all-time favorite songs.

=== Accolades ===
Critical rankings for The Execution of All Things
| Publication | Work | List | Year | Rank | Ref. |
|---|---|---|---|---|---|
| Stereogum | "The Execution of All Things" | The 10 Best Rilo Kiley Songs | 2013 | 6 | |
| Stereogum | "My Slumbering Heart" | The 10 Best Rilo Kiley Songs | 2013 | 5 | |
| Stereogum | "A Better Son/Daughter" | The 10 Best Rilo Kiley Songs | 2013 | 3 | |
| Stereogum | "With Arms Outstretched" | The 10 Best Rilo Kiley Songs | 2013 | 2 | |
| Paste | The Execution of All Things | Rilo Kiley's 6 Albums, Ranked | 2020 | 2 | |
| BrooklynVegan | The Execution of All Things | 35 Best Emo & Post-Hardcore Albums of 2002 | 2022 | 2 | |

== Track listing ==
All songs written by Jenny Lewis and Blake Sennett, except where noted.

| No. | Title | Writer(s) | Length |
|---|---|---|---|
| 1. | "The Good That Won't Come Out" | | 4:31 |
| 2. | "Paint's Peeling" | | 3:20 |
| 3. | "The Execution of All Things" | Ben Boyer, Lewis, Sennett | 4:13 |
| 4. | "So Long" | | 5:27 |
| 5. | "Capturing Moods" | | 3:35 |
| 6. | "A Better Son/Daughter" | | 4:39 |
| 7. | "Hail to Whatever You Found in the Sunlight That Surrounds You" | | 3:20 |
| 8. | "My Slumbering Heart" | | 5:36 |
| 9. | "Three Hopeful Thoughts" | | 2:50 |
| 10. | "With Arms Outstretched" | | 3:43 |
| 11. | "Spectacular Views" | | 6:30 |
| Total length: | | | 47:44 |

== Personnel ==
Sourced from The Execution of All Things' liner notes.

Rilo Kiley

- Jenny Lewis – vocals (all tracks), organ (1), guitar (1, 2, 4), keyboards (1, 6–8, 11), bass guitar (3, 5, 9), Rhodes electric piano (8, 11), Ace Tone electric organ (12)
- Blake Sennett – vocals (2, 4, 6–9, 11), boy choir (10); guitar (1–11), keyboards (2, 6), sequencing (3, 8), bass & multi-chord steel guitar (10)
- Pierre de Reeder – bass guitar (1, 2, 4, 6–8, 11), guitar (1, 3, 9), keyboards (5)
- Jason Boesel – boy choir (10); drums (1–9, 11), orchestra bells (1, 2), glockenspiel (10)

Additional musicians

- Amy Huffman – violin on "The Execution of All Things" and "Capturing Moods"
- Gretta Cohn – cello on "The Execution of All Things" and "Capturing Moods"
- Jiha Lee – flute on "Hail to Whatever You Found in the Sunlight that Surrounds You"
- Kristen Bailey – saw on "And That's How I Choose to Remember It"
- Mike Mogis – pedal steel, guitar, vibraphone and glockenspiel on "The Good That Won't Come Out," pedal steel on "Paint's Peeling," pedal steel and vibraphone on "Hail to Whatever You Found in the Sunlight that Surrounds You," banjo on "And That's How I Choose to Remember It."
- Rick Ricker – French horn on "Capturing Moods" and "My Slumbering Heart"
- Ryan Fox – saxophone on "The Good That Won't Come Out"
- Tim Kasher – accordion on "So Long"
- Boy Choir on "With Arms Outstretched" – Blake Sennett, Jason Boesel, Conor Oberst and A.J. Mogis
