= The Initial Friend =

Rilo Kiley

EP by Rilo Kiley
- Released: 1999
- Genre: Indie rock
- Length: 32:03
- Label: Rilo Records
- Producer: Sandbox

Rilo Kiley chronology
Rilo Kiley (1999)	Take Offs and Landings (2001)

The Initial Friend EP cover
- Cover of the third pressing, entitled The Initial Friend EP

Rilo Kiley, also known as The Initial Friend EP, is the first release by Los Angeles–based rock band Rilo Kiley. It was initially released independently in 1999 under the title Rilo Kiley. It was subsequently re-pressed in 2000 and again in 2001, under the name The Initial Friend EP with an alternate track-listing and cover. All three releases commonly sell on eBay for between $250–400 and are fairly rare.

The recording sessions for the EP were funded by comedian and actor Dave Foley, who was an early fan of the band and had attended their first concert in January 1998.

"Frug," which references the 1960s dance of the same name, and "85" were included in the soundtrack to the Christina Ricci film Desert Blue, which led to the band's heightened popularity and eventual signing to a record label. "Frug" was also the band's first music video.

"Frug" was later included as the final song on the band's B-sides and rarities compilation, Rkives.

The EP was reissued 2 October 2020 on the Little Record Company label on streaming services and originally due on vinyl as well. The vinyl was finally released 20 November 2020 because of production delays and was sold out during pre-order before the release date.

== Track listing ==
All songs written by Jenny Lewis and Blake Sennett.

First Pressing (Self-Titled CD)
No.	Title	Length
1.	"Frug"	2:41
2.	"85"	5:16
3.	"Glendora"	2:47
4.	"Papillon"	3:51
5.	"Teenage Love Song"	5:52
6.	"Asshole"	5:24
7.	"Sword"	2:47
8.	"Steve"	1:31
9.	"Untitled" (hidden track, referred to by fans as "Keep It Together")	1:54
Total length:		32:03

Second Pressing (Self-Titled CD)
No.	Title	Length
1.	"Frug"	2:41
2.	"Papillon"	3:51
3.	"Always"	2:19
4.	"85"	5:16
5.	"Glendora"	2:47
6.	"Teenage Love Song"	5:26
7.	"Sword"	2:47
8.	"Asshole"	5:24
9.	"Gravity"	2:47
10.	"Troubadours / The Annoying Noise of Death" (hidden track)	22:04
Total length:		55:22

Third Pressing ("The Initial Friend EP" CD)
No.	Title	Length
1.	"Frug"	2:41
2.	"Papillon"	3:51
3.	"Always"	2:19
4.	"85"	5:16
5.	"Sword"	2:47
6.	"Asshole"	5:24
7.	"Gravity"	2:47
8.	"Troubadours"	3:26
Total length:		28:31

Fourth Pressing (Self-Titled LP/digital)
No.	Title	Length
1.	"Frug"	2:41
2.	"Papillon"	3:50
3.	"Always"	2:18
4.	"85"	5:16
5.	"Glendora"	2:45
6.	"Teenage Love Song"	5:52
7.	"Sword"	2:46
8.	"Asshole"	5:24
9.	"Gravity"	2:47
Total length:		33:39
