= In the Red Light =

Essay by Norman Mailer

- Author: Norman Mailer
- Genre: Politics
- Published in: Esquire
- Publication date: November 1964
- Publication place: United States
- Media type: Print (Magazine)
- Pages: 18

"In the Red Light: A History of the Republican Convention in 1964" is an essay written by Norman Mailer for Esquire about the Republican National Convention in 1964. Like Mailer's other journalism in the 1960s, "Red Light" uses the subjective techniques of new journalism and assumes a third-person persona to participate in, report on, and comment on the events in California in the summer of 1964. The essay is divided into three sections: the events leading up to the convention, including Goldwater's rise, the events leading up to Goldwater's nomination, and Mailer's view of his acceptance.

== Background ==
Norman Mailer covered the 1964 Republican Convention for Esquire. Mailer biographer J. Michael Lennon reveals that on the eve of the convention Mailer expected right-wing Arizona senator Barry Goldwater to win the nomination. Lennon maps out the political territory at the convention: "The right-wing of the GOP had grown strong and was ready to wrest control from the old middle-of-the-road gang" like Goldwater's primary challenger, moderate Republican William Scranton from Pennsylvania. Lennon records that "Part of Mailer wanted Goldwater to not only win the nomination, but to defeat the presumptive Democratic candidate, President Johnson, whom he distrusted if not despised. Mailer even speculates that a Johnson victory might lead to an escalation in the Vietnam War, a fear that would be proven correct shortly after the publication of "Red Light". His conjecture was that a Goldwater victory might "invigorate the left wing of the Democratic party". Lennon adds that "Mailer was convinced that the nation was in terrible shape, gorging itself on frozen food, sappy television, antibiotics, and cutoff from nature by technology and the most insidious of substances, one that becoming ubiquitous: plastic", all themes of his literary journalism and nonfiction during the 1960s-70s.

== Synopsis ==
Mailer divides the essay into three sections after a brief prologue in which he returned to a theme he had begun to develop in "Superman Comes to the Supermarket": that the United States was fighting an "undeclared war", but there were really two wars. The first was waged on the beauty of old American cities like San Francisco, scene of the convention, by corporate America, which was determined to destroy that beauty with its soulless, artificial architecture. The second war was an internecine struggle within the Republican party between the older Eastern Establishment, represented by Presidential candidate William Scranton of Pennsylvania, and the newer Western monied interests, represented by his rival, Senator Barry Goldwater of Arizona.

Mailer begins section one by describing the atmosphere at the Mark Hopkins Hotel, site of Scranton's and Goldwater's campaign headquarters where "the open war between old money and new money was engaged". Mailer characterizes both candidates' personalities and critiques their rhetorical styles. He reframes the "war” between the two candidates and their supporters as between Main Street and Wall Street. He concludes this section with dark forebodings that America might be drifting toward totalitarianism.

In section two the scene shifts to the Cow Palace in San Francisco, site of the convention itself. Mailer offers a critique of the press, whose function, he says, is "to serve in the maintenance of the Establishment", and he writes of the far Right's contempt for the media as illustrated by the delegates themselves. The convention, he says, was "murderous in mood". Mailer contrasts the post-WWII emergence of the Beat Generation with that of the "underground generation of the Right". The party's Moderates speak in support of civil rights, but they are heavily outnumbered by the right-wing forces, especially the Southern delegates. The nomination speeches go on and on, and Mailer comments that "politics was the place where finally nobody meant what they said".

Section three begins with Goldwater's acceptance speech, during which Mailer has a sudden intuition that the candidate "could win because something in me leaped at the thought; a part of me, a devil, wished to take that chance. For if Goldwater were President, a new opposition would form." He then returns to a familiar theme that "The country was in disease. . . . We had never solved our depression, we had merely gone to war, and going to war had never won it, not in our own minds." Mailer laments that in the recent past the country had a hero in President Kennedy, but since his assassination, "Certainties had shattered". Now, the country's liberal status quo needed a "purge". Leaving the convention, Mailer witnesses a group of protestors from the Congress of Racial Equality (CORE) marching and chanting while the Republican crowd surrounding them fantasizes about Christians being fed to the lions, but "the old Wasps" are also disturbed because they see themselves embodied in one of the white female protestors. Mailer concludes with the prophecy that "The wars are coming and the deep revolutions of the soul".

== Analysis ==
In much of his literary journalism, Mailer employed a technique widely shared among New Journalists of his era, the adoption of subjective point of view. Critic Robert Merrill argues that its Mailer's participation in the action distinguishes his account from other journalistic reports of the events. Mailer tends to become his own third-person narrator, his own main character and central consciousness, but William T. Ross (2016) observes that "Red Light" does not foreground Mailer's participation in events to the same degree that he does in his other campaign journalism. Ross sees "Red Light" as perhaps "Mailer's most journalistic piece about the ways political conventions worked in this days", but he also notices traces of the author himself, detecting Mailer's presence in "a number of perennial obsessions [including] plastic and political assassinations and the imminent arrival of fascism." Mailer's account shows his engagement with the events of the convention and not just, as Merrill puts it, a "disinterested historian".

Michael K. Glenday focuses on Mailer's exploration of existential themes throughout the late-1950s and early-1960s, specifically "societal repression and inauthenticity". In "Superman Comes to the Supermarket", his essay on the 1960 Democratic convention, Mailer characterizes Kennedy as an existential hero, but Glenday says that in the wake of Kennedy's assassination, "Mailer saw that the ensuing national grief was taking a downward turn into madness and psychic breakdown, writing rangy critique of the national weltanschauung". Mary Dearborn suggests that while Goldwater seemed to represent the anthesis of the extremism that Mailer felt the country needed, part of Mailer desired a Goldwater victory so that the disease of impending totalitarianism would have to be addressed. In other words, Goldwater would be a more clearly defined enemy around which that "new opposition would form", rather than the nebulous threat of a continued Johnson administration.

What Robert Begiebing said of Mailer's rhetoric and style in Miami and the Siege of Chicago, his book-length coverage of the 1968 Democratic convention, could be said of "Red Light". Begiebing states that Mailer "doesn't so much convince readers as sweep them along, beyond agreement/disagreement, in cataracts of prose. Lengthy catalogues of detail, quick-changing sequences of metaphor, startling aperçus, quick and revelatory character sketches, and sonorous rhythms are all on display." J. Michael Lennon echoes Begiebing by observing that Mailer's character sketches of figures like Goldwater and Eisenhower are "acerbic, unforgiving, and hit the mark".

== Publication ==
"Red Light" was originally published in the November 1964 issue of Esquire. A partial reprint appeared in The Realist in June of 1965 as "Mailer on LBJ" in the transcript of a speech Mailer gave at the antiwar protest at Berkley on May 21. Mailer reprinted the essay in several later collections: Cannibals and Christians (1967), The Idol and the Octopus: Political Writings by Norman Mailer on the Kennedy and Johnson Administrations (1968), Some Honorable Men: Political Conventions, 1960-1972 (1976), and Norman Mailer: Collected Essays of the 1960s (2018).
