= The Moneymaker =

2007 single by Rilo Kiley

Single by Rilo Kiley

from the album Under the Blacklight
- B-side: "Draggin' Around"; "Big Break"
- Released: July 3, 2007
- Studio: Sonora Recorders (Los Feliz)
- Genre: Indie pop; indie rock
- Length: 2:51
- Label: Warner Bros.
- Songwriter: Jenny Lewis
- Producers: Jason Lader; Rilo Kiley

Rilo Kiley singles chronology
"I Never" (2005)	"The Moneymaker" (2007)	"Silver Lining" (2007)

Music video
- "The Moneymaker" on YouTube

"The Moneymaker" is a song by American indie rock band Rilo Kiley. It was released on July 3, 2007, as the first single from the group's fourth album Under the Blacklight (2007). The lyrics are almost certainly about sex, if not prostitution or the adult industry, in keeping with the album's theme of showing the "sketchy side" of Los Angeles.

== Music video ==
The music video for "The Moneymaker" opens with brief clips of interviews (apparently conducted by Jenny Lewis) with pornographic actors Tommy Gunn, Faye Runaway, and Hailey Young. Along with the band, these three are featured in the video, where they interact in what is best described as a sexually charged manner.

In the longer, 12 minute version of the video, additional adult stars Emma Cummings, Brooke Scott, Vanessa Lynn, Jeremy Steele, Jersey Jaxin, Italia Christie, King James, Satine Phoenix, McKenzie Michelle, Starlet, Gianna Lynn, and John Ketchmark are seeing being interviewed for parts in the video.

== In popular culture ==
In 2009 American-based fast-food restaurant chain Carl's Jr. used the song in one of its commercials featuring Audrina Patridge. The same year "The Moneymaker" was featured in an episode of 90210 TV series.

== Track listing ==
Digital download
No.	Title	Length
1.	"The Moneymaker"	2:51

Digital download — EP
No.	Title	Length
1.	"The Moneymaker"	2:51
2.	"Draggin' Around"	3:24
3.	"Big Break"	2:31
