= Take Offs and Landings =

Studio album by Rilo Kiley
- Released: July 31, 2001
- Studio: Echo Signal Lab, Los Angeles, California
- Genre: Indie rock; indie pop; emo
- Length: 47:02
- Label: Rilo; Barsuk
- Producer: Rilo Kiley

Rilo Kiley chronology
The Initial Friend (2001)	Take Offs and Landings (2001)	The Execution of All Things (2002)

Original cover
- Cover of the original pressing on Rilo Records

Singles from Take Offs and Landings
- 1. "Science vs. Romance" Released: 2001

Professional ratings
Review scores
Source	Rating
AllMusic	4/5 stars
Paste	8.2/10
Pitchfork	4.0/10 (2002); 8.0/10 (2021)

Take Offs and Landings is Rilo Kiley's debut studio album, originally released in 2001 on the vanity label "Rilo Records", then shortly thereafter on the independent label Barsuk Records. It was released for the first time on vinyl on March 15, 2011.

Of Rilo Kiley's albums, Take Offs and Landings contains the most songs sung by band member Blake Sennett, who sings lead on "August", "Small Figures in a Vast Expanse", "Rest of My Life", and a hidden track. Jenny Lewis sings lead on the other tracks, except for the instrumental tracks "Variations on a Theme (Science vs. Romance)" and "Variations on a Theme (Plane Crash in C)".

The album's hidden track, which did not appear on the first pressing, is officially titled "Spectacular Views". However, since a later Rilo Kiley song (the closing track to The Execution of All Things) has the same name, it is often referred to as "Salute My Shorts!", in reference to Sennett's acting role on the Nickelodeon television show Salute Your Shorts.

As of July 2006, the album has sold 66,000 copies in United States.

== Critical reception and legacy ==
In a 20th-anniversary retrospective, Stereogum's Abby Jones wrote that Landings "isn't the best album Rilo Kiley ever made", as they were "still zeroing in on their sound" at the time. She called it "a treat to hear them start to get there" though, praising "Lewis and [Blake] Sennett's proficiency in indie rock" reflected through its "melting pot" of musical styles. Jones also argued for recognition of both the album and Rilo Kiley within emo music's canon, despite attracting the same fans of their "similarly sullen" peers like Bright Eyes and Death Cab for Cutie. She observed Lewis' lyrics' "often macabre nature" and said that "at her best, she could eclipse her male peers." Later that year, Take Offs and Landings was included on a Pitchfork list of revised reviews, with its original 2002 score of 4.0 raised to 8.0. The site's Quinn Moreland recognized the album's status as "an undeniable classic" and praised Rilo Kiley's use of indie pop in making "candid and often devastating observations about longing, insecurities, and the uncertainties of young adulthood." Though Rilo Kiley "were still finding their footing" on the album, she wrote that it "shines when [they] allow themselves to expand into their ambitions."

=== Accolades ===
Critical rankings for Take Offs and Landings
Publication	Work	List	Year	Rank	Ref.
Stereogum	"Science Vs. Romance"	The 10 Best Rilo Kiley Songs	2013	8	
Stereogum	"Pictures Of Success"	The 10 Best Rilo Kiley Songs	2013	7	
Paste	Take Offs and Landings	Rilo Kiley's 6 Albums, Ranked	2020	5	

== Track listing ==
All songs written by Jenny Lewis and Blake Sennett.

Rilo Records edition
No.	Title	Length
1.	"Go Ahead"	3:34
2.	"Science vs. Romance"	5:43
3.	"Wires and Waves"	3:17
4.	"Pictures of Success"	6:51
5.	"August"	3:18
6.	"Bulletproof"	1:57
7.	"Plane Crash in C"	5:11
8.	"Small Figures in a Vast Expanse"	3:19
9.	"Don't Deconstruct"	2:37
10.	"Always"	4:00
11.	"We'll Never Sleep (God Knows We'll Try)"	2:54
12.	"Rest of My Life"	2:10
13.	"Variations on a Theme (Plane Crash in C)"	1:35
Total length:		46:26

Barsuk Records edition
No.	Title	Length
8.	"Variations on a Theme (Science vs. Romance)"	0:36
9.	"Small Figures in a Vast Expanse"	3:19
10.	"Don't Deconstruct"	2:37
11.	"Always"	4:00
12.	"We'll Never Sleep (God Knows We'll Try)"	2:54
13.	"Rest of My Life"	2:10
14.	"Variations on a Theme (Plane Crash in C)"	1:35
Total length:		47:02

Vinyl exclusive bonus track
No.	Title	Length
15.	"Spectacular Views" (re-titled Salute My Shorts!)	3:36
Total length:		50:38

== Personnel ==
- Jenny Lewis – vocals, keyboards, guitar
- Blake Sennett – guitar, keyboards, vocals
- Pierre de Reeder – bass guitar, guitar, backing vocals
- Dave Rock – drums, percussion

=== Additional musicians ===
- Phillip Watt - trumpet on "Pictures of Success," "Plane Crash in C," and "Don't Deconstruct"
- Alex Greenwald - synths on "Pictures of Success" and "Plane Crash in C"
- Shana Levy - keyboard on "Go Ahead"
- Larissa Brantner - violin on "Don't Deconstruct" and "Rest of My Life"
- Aram Arslanian - keyboard on "Plane Crash in C"
- Ben Boyer - drums on "We'll Never Sleep (God Knows We'll Try)"
- Danny Cooksey - backing vocals on "Science vs. Romance" and "Always"
