= Night Terrors of 1927 =

American pop superduo (2012–2017)

- Origin: Los Angeles, California, United States
- Genres: Indie pop
- Years active: 2012–2017
- Label: Atlantic
- Website: nightterrorsof1927.com

Night Terrors of 1927 was an American pop superduo from Los Angeles, California, signed to Atlantic Records. The duo composed of Jarrod Gorbel (ex-front man for Brooklyn outfit The Honorary Title) and then-former Rilo Kiley guitarist Blake Sennett. In 2012 the two created Night Terrors. On May 5, 2017, the group's social media announced the band's end.

== Career ==
=== Early beginnings ===
“Blake Sennett and Jarrod Gorbel had no intention of being in a band together when they started writing the songs that evolved into Night Terrors of 1927. They were just trying something different. "I think we each had let go of the idea of being anything we'd ever been before," says Sennett, whose previous projects include The Elected and Rilo Kiley. "I had given up the band dream in a way that has been kind of reborn in me. I had put it in the ground and buried it and was like, 'Cool, I'll just write and produce and that's where I'll go". The duo have posted a handful of tracks to their SoundCloud page and released a debut EP via Atlantic on November 11, 2013. "When You Were Mine" impacted radio on October 14, 2014. In November 2014, the duo released a single featuring Canadian pop duo Tegan and Sara, and in January 2015, they released their first album, Everything's Coming Up Roses. In March and April, the group supported Bleachers on their headlining US tour, dubbed Bleachers Come Alive!.

== Discography ==
Studio albums

- Everything's Coming Up Roses (2015)

Extended plays

- Guilty Pleas EP (2013)
- Anything to Anyone (2014)

Singles

- Young and Vicious (2013)

Music videos

- Dust and Bones (2014)
- When You Were Mine (Feat. Tegan and Sara) (2014)
- Always Take You Back (2014)
