= More Adventurous =

Studio album by Rilo Kiley
- Released: August 17, 2004
- Recorded: Late 2003
- Genres: Indie rock; alternative pop; emo
- Length: 44:06
- Label: Brute/Beaute
- Producers: Mike Mogis, Mark Trombino, Jimmy Tamborello

Rilo Kiley chronology
| The Execution of All Things (2002) | More Adventurous (2004) | Under the Blacklight (2007) |

Singles from More Adventurous
- 1. "It's a Hit" Released: July 20, 2004; 2. "Portions for Foxes" Released: July 27, 2004; 3. "I Never" Released: 2005

Professional ratings
Aggregate scores
| Source | Rating |
|---|---|
| Metacritic | 75/100 |
Review scores
| Source | Rating |
| AllMusic | 3.5/5 stars |
| Blender | 4/5 stars |
| Entertainment Weekly | B+ |
| The Guardian | 3/5 stars |
| The Independent | 5/5 stars |
| Mojo | 4/5 stars |
| Pitchfork | 6.7/10 |
| Q | 3/5 stars |
| Rolling Stone | 3/5 stars |
| Uncut | 4/5 stars |

More Adventurous is the third studio album by American indie rock band Rilo Kiley. Released on August 17, 2004 by Brute/Beaute Records, a self-made imprint distributed by Warner Records, it was the band's major label debut.

As of June 2007, sales of the album in the United States had exceeded 173,000 copies, according to Nielsen SoundScan.

== Song information ==
"Portions for Foxes" references the bible verse Psalms 63:10.

To achieve the vulnerable effect for which the song was intended, Lewis recorded her vocal for "I Never" naked in the studio.

"Ripchord" and "It Just Is" were written in response to the death of Elliott Smith.

"Accidntel Deth" was produced by Jimmy Tamborello, who is known for his work in The Postal Service and as Dntel (which explains the unusual spelling of the song's title).

"More Adventurous" alludes to a line from Frank O'Hara's "Meditations in an Emergency": "Each time my heart is broken it makes me feel more adventurous (and how the same names keep recurring on that interminable list!), but one of these days there’ll be nothing left with which to venture forth."

== Release ==
Two versions of the album were released: a version in a jewel case, which was sold in stores, and a limited edition (1,000 copies) digipak version sold at the release party and concert for the album.

"I Never" and "Ripchord" were included in several feature films, including Must Love Dogs, Conversations with Other Women, and John Tucker Must Die. "Portions for Foxes" is included as part of the Rock Band 3 soundtrack and was also featured in the first episode of the first season of the medical drama Grey's Anatomy. "More Adventurous" was featured on the soundtrack to the 2005 film Wedding Crashers. In 2015, "It Just Is" was used in the promotional commercial for MTV's slasher series Scream.

== Reception ==
The album received critical praise. Noted rock critic Robert Christgau named it the fifth best release of 2004 and later included it in his list of the greatest albums of the 2000-2009 decade, placing it in the twenty-fourth spot. Christgau also declared "It's a Hit" song of the year for 2004 and subsequently listed it as the eighth best song of the decade. The album placed fourteenth on the Pazz & Jop poll for 2004.

In 2017, NPR Music's Ilana Kaplan dubbed the album "a masterpiece in songwriting vulnerability." Kaplan dubbed Jenny Lewis "an emo pioneer", citing her "bold confrontation of anger and her ability to mourn in such a raw way" as reasons. She also noted that Lewis' handling of topics like marriage, divorce, and more "set apart her perspective in the midst of male voices" prominent within the genre.

In 2023, alternative music website Melophobe ranked the album as the 28th best indie rock album of all time. Melophobe subsequently ranked "It's a Hit" and "Portions For Foxes" as the 15th and 51st greatest indie rock songs since 2000 respectively.

== Track listing ==
| No. | Title | Writer(s) | Producer(s) | Length |
|---|---|---|---|---|
| 1. | "It's a Hit" | Jenny Lewis | Mike Mogis | 4:28 |
| 2. | "Does He Love You?" | Lewis, Blake Sennett | Mike Mogis | 5:14 |
| 3. | "Portions for Foxes" | Lewis, Sennett | Mark Trombino | 4:45 |
| 4. | "Ripchord" | Sennett | Mike Mogis | 2:09 |
| 5. | "I Never" | Lewis | Mike Mogis | 4:33 |
| 6. | "The Absence of God" | Lewis, Sennett | Mike Mogis, Mark Trombino | 3:55 |
| 7. | "Accidntel Deth" | Lewis | Jimmy Tamborello | 4:26 |
| 8. | "More Adventurous" | Lewis, Sennett | Mike Mogis | 3:27 |
| 9. | "Love and War (11/11/46)" | Lewis | Mike Mogis | 3:36 |
| 10. | "A Man/Me/Then Jim" | Lewis, Sennett | Mike Mogis | 5:24 |
| 11. | "It Just Is" | Lewis | Mike Mogis, Mark Trombino | 2:26 |
| Total length: | | | | 44:06 |

== Personnel ==
Sourced from AllMusic and liner notes.

Rilo Kiley

- Jenny Lewis – lead and backing vocals, electric guitar, keyboards, piano, Wurlitzer electric piano, organ, Mellotron, harmonica
- Blake Sennett – backing vocals, lead vocals on "Ripchord", electric and acoustic guitars, 12-string acoustic guitar, Optigan, JX-3P Arp, Moog, handclaps
- Pierre de Reeder – bass guitar
- Jason Boesel – drums, tambourine, metal pipe, timpani, conga, handbell, shaker, glockenspiel, percussion, backing vocals on "It's a Hit", handclaps

Additional Personnel

- Mike Mogis – pedal steel guitar, vibraphone, glockenspiel, "Memory Man" echo pedal, banjo, sequencing, Wurlitzer electric piano, electric and acoustic guitars, synthesizer, mandolin
- Nate Walcott – trumpet, flugelhorn, orchestra bells, string and horn arrangements
- No Better Cause (Nate Kellison, Luke Kellison, Justin Runge, Adam McCarville, Zakk Wooten) - backing vocals on "It's a Hit" and "I Never"
- Jon Hischke - baritone saxophone on "It's a Hit"
- Amy Huffman - violin on "It's a Hit"
- Summit Strings - strings on "Does He Love You?", "I Never", and "It Just Is"
  - Kim Salistean - violin
  - Donna Carnes - violin
  - Clark Potter - viola
  - Tracy Sands - cello
- Mike Bloom - acoustic guitar on "The Absence of God"
- Kianna Alarid - backing vocals on "The Absence of God"
- Neely Jenkins - backing vocals on "The Absence of God"
- Nick White - "support" on "The Absence of God"
- Clint Wheeler - handclaps on "Love and War (11/11/46)"
- Nate Lefeber - trombone on "A Man/Me/Then Jim"
- Rick Ricker - French horn on "A Man/Me/Then Jim"
- Jamie Williams - spoken word on "A Man/Me/Then Jim"

Production

- Mike Mogis - producer, mixing
- Mark Trombino - producer on "Portions for Foxes", "The Absence of God" and "It Just Is"
- Jimmy Tamborello - producer on "Accidntel Deth"
- "Farmer" Dave Scher - additional production assistance on "Accidntel Deth"
- A.J. Mogis - mixing on "Love and War (11/11/46)"
- Stephen Marcussen - mastering
- Nami Ito - cover art
- Yoshi - layout
- RJ Shaughnessy - photography
- DCM - management

== Chart performance ==
| Chart (2004) | Peak Position |
|---|---|
| U.S. Billboard 200 | 161 |
| U.S. Top Heatseekers Albums | 7 |
