= Desert Blue =

1998 American comedy-drama film by Morgan J. Freeman

- Theatrical release poster
- Directed by: Morgan J. Freeman
- Written by: Morgan J. Freeman
- Produced by: Effie Brown; Michael Burns; Nadia Leonelli; Andrea Sperling
- Starring: Brendan Sexton III; Kate Hudson; John Heard; Christina Ricci; Casey Affleck; Sara Gilbert; Ethan Suplee; Peter Sarsgaard; Michael Ironside
- Cinematography: Enrique Chediak
- Edited by: Sabine Hoffmann
- Music by: Vytas Nagisetty
- Distributed by: Franchise Pictures
- Release date: September 12, 1998
- Running time: 90 minutes
- Country: United States
- Language: English

Desert Blue is a 1998 American comedy-drama film written and directed by Morgan J. Freeman, and starring Brendan Sexton III, Kate Hudson, Christina Ricci, Casey Affleck, Sara Gilbert, and John Heard.

Desert Blue was released by Franchise Pictures on September 12, 1998 to mixed reviews from critics.

== Plot ==
A rising Hollywood starlet becomes "marooned" in a small desert town while on a roadtrip with her father. There, she gets to know the town's rather eccentric residents, including one whose hobby is pipe bombs and another who is trying to carry out his father's dream of building a waterpark in the desert.

== Cast ==
- Brendan Sexton III as Blue Baxter
- Kate Hudson as Skye Davis
- Christina Ricci as Ely Jackson
- Casey Affleck as Peter Kepler
- John Heard as Professor Lance Davidson
- Ethan Suplee as Cale
- Sara Gilbert as Sandy
- Isidra Vega as Haley Gordon
- Peter Sarsgaard as Billy Baxter
- Rene Rivera as Dr. Gordon
- Lee Holmes as Deputy Keeler
- Lucinda Jenney as Caroline Baxter
- Jerry Agee as Insurance Agent
- Daniel Von Bargen as Sheriff Jackson
- Richmond Arquette as Truck Driver
- Michael Ironside as FBI Agent Frank Bellows
- Nate Moore as FBI Agent Red
- Ntare Guma Mbaho Mwine as FBI Agent Green
- Aunjanue Ellis as FBI Agent Summers
- Fred Schneider as KBLU Radio DJ (voice)
- Liev Schreiber as Mickey Moonday (voice)
- MacDaddy Beefcake as Telly Clems (voice)

== Soundtrack ==
The soundtrack features songs by The Candyskins, Rilo Kiley, Janis Ian, and others.

== Reception ==
Rotten Tomatoes, review aggregator, reports that 37% of 19 surveyed critics gave the film a positive review; the average rating was 5/10. Glenn Lovell of Variety called it "a cloying, mechanically plotted comedy." Lawrence Van Gelder of The New York Times wrote, "The graceful literary and directorial touch of Morgan J. Freeman turns these youngsters into individuals rather than cinema's customary caricatures." John Anderson of the Los Angeles Times wrote, "It's a small story, perhaps even an ephemeral movie, but Desert Blue also has a novelistic capacity for character and setting, without either the maudlin sentimentality or gratuitous vulgarity of most teen-oriented movies." Roger Ebert of The Chicago Sun-Times rated it three out of four stars and compared it to The Last Picture Show and U Turn, saying that it is the "herbal tea" version of the latter. Lisa Schwarzbaum of Entertainment Weekly gave the film a grade of C and described the setting as "yet another indie drama set in a burg reminiscent, by way of aggressive eccentricity, of TV's Northern Exposure."
