= Rilo Kiley =

American indie rock band

- Rilo Kiley performing in 2007

Background information
- Origin: Los Angeles, California
- Genres: Indie rock, indie pop
- Years active: 1998–2013; 2025–present
- Labels: Warner Bros., Brute/Beaute, Saddle Creek, Barsuk, Rilo
- Spinoffs: The Postal Service; The Elected; Conor Oberst and the Mystic Valley Band; Phases; Jenny and Johnny; Night Terrors of 1927; Nice as Fuck
- Spinoff of: Evergreen; Caustic Truth
- Members: Jenny Lewis; Blake Sennett; Pierre de Reeder; Jason Boesel
- Past members: Dave Rock; Mike Bloom
- Website: www.rilokiley.com

Rilo Kiley (/ˈraɪloʊ ˈkaɪli/ RY-loh KY-lee) is an American indie rock band based in Los Angeles, California. Formed in 1998, the band consists of Jenny Lewis, Blake Sennett, Pierre de Reeder, and Jason Boesel.

The group released their debut album Take-Offs and Landings under Seattle-based independent label Barsuk Records in 2001. After that, they released three additional studio albums and several EPs. In 2007, they were signed with Warner Bros. and subsequently made their major-label debut with the album Under the Blacklight.

== History ==
Rilo Kiley performed their first concert at Spaceland in Los Angeles in January 1998. Their debut EP, Rilo Kiley (later reissued as The Initial Friend EP), was released in 1999. It was funded by The Kids in the Hall's Dave Foley. In 2000, Sennett and Lewis played fictionalized versions of themselves on ABC's drama Once & Again, with the band also performing in the episode. The band signed with independent label Barsuk Records for its first full-length album, Take-Offs and Landings, in 2001. The band later signed with Omaha's Saddle Creek Records and released The Execution of All Things in 2002. In 2004, they released More Adventurous on its imprint, Brute/Beaute Records, which was distributed by major label Warner Bros. Records. The band later signed directly with Warner Bros.

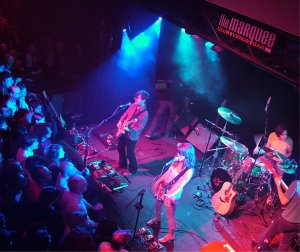
Rilo Kiley performing at the Marquee Club in London in 2004

2004 saw a great increase in recognition for the band, as Sennett and Boesel released an album with their band The Elected and Lewis sang backup on The Postal Service's Give Up. Lewis toured with The Postal Service before heading out on two tours supporting Rilo Kiley's More Adventurous in the summer and fall of 2004. The album spent late 2004 high on Billboard's Heatseekers Chart and was promoted with appearances on Late Night with Conan O'Brien and Jimmy Kimmel Live!. The band opened for Bright Eyes on the international leg of Conor Oberst's tour for 2005's I'm Wide Awake, It's Morning and was the opening act for the North American dates of Coldplay's Twisted Logic Tour in Fall 2005. "I Never" and "Ripchord" (from More Adventurous) have been featured in several feature films, including Must Love Dogs, Conversations with Other Women, and John Tucker Must Die. "The Execution of All Things" and "With Arms Outstretched" (from The Execution of All Things) have been featured in various TV shows, including Six Feet Under and Weeds.

The band's fourth album Under the Blacklight was released August 20, 2007 in the United Kingdom and the following day in the United States. Its first single was "The Moneymaker". For the video, the band cast "real-life porn stars," which Lewis says were told they were auditioning for "softcore porn."

On September 6, 2007, the band began a North American tour in support of Under the Blacklight. On this tour, it was joined by Orenda Fink (of Azure Ray) and Kristin Gundred (of Grand Ole Party and Dum Dum Girls).

The group was also known for its charitable contributions, particularly to the Elliott Smith Memorial Fund, in honor of the late singer and friend of the band. Sennett and Lewis participated in a memorial concert for the singer shortly after he died in 2003. In 2007, the band contributed a t-shirt, which was designed by de Reeder for the Yellow Bird Project to benefit the Elliott Smith Memorial Fund.

=== Hiatus and breakup ===
In a 2010 interview with Paste, Jason Boesel said the band was taking a break but working on a compilation of unreleased songs. He also said there were no plans to release a new album in the near future.

In an April 2011 interview, Blake Sennett said, "I would say that if Rilo Kiley were ... hmmm ... a human being ... hmmm ... he's probably laying on his back in a morgue with a tag on his toe. Now, I see movies where the dead get up and walk. And when they do that, rarely do good things happen."

In June 2011, when asked about his "corpse" comment and whether Rilo Kiley was indeed dead, Sennett said, "I never say never. I loved Rilo Kiley—I loved writing with Jenny. I think she's a great artist and great to write with. I think we're not there yet. Maybe one day we'll dust it off and give it a go; I'd be open to it. I think it was fun—for all of the pitfalls, it was great. I had a great time in Rilo Kiley. I always did."

A month later, Sennett told AOL's Spinner: "I said, 'Fuck that, I can't do this anymore.' That being said, it was probably immature and came from a place of ego. I think that stuff will rear its head in anything you do, depending on the personnel you surround yourself with; things change over time [sic], and people change, and relationships change."

In February 2013, the band announced a collection of previously released rarities and unreleased material, titled Rkives, to be released in April 2013 on DeReeder's label, the Little Record Company.

In a 2014 interview with the National Post, Jenny Lewis confirmed the band had officially broken up.

In April 2015, Blake Sennett joined Jenny Lewis and her band on stage at Coachella for a performance of the Rilo Kiley song "Portions for Foxes."

Since embarking on a solo career, Jenny Lewis has enlisted the help of drummer Jason Boesel both live and on studio recordings.

=== Reunion ===
The band reunited in 2025, embarking on a North American tour and playing at the Just Like Heaven Festival on May 10, 2025 at the Rose Bowl. On May 9, 2025, the band appeared on Jimmy Kimmel Live!, performing "Silver Lining." Speaking about the reunion, Lewis said “It couldn't have happened any sooner. It feels like now is the time to share that joy and love with each other and with everyone else.” Describing the band's coming-together again, de Reeder said “Planning this reunion over these past months has been like reconnecting with family. We haven’t missed a beat. The stakes are only to have a good time, to revel in this nostalgia." The band earned praise for their performances at the outset of the reunion.

== Origin of the band's name ==
On the syndicated radio show Loveline in August 2005, Sennett explained that he had a dream in which a sports almanac was chasing him: "When it got me, I leafed through it...and I came upon an Australian rules football player from the 19th century named Rilo Kiley. It's kind of embarrassing." When asked by co-host Drew Pinsky if he had ever seen this name in reality, Sennett said, "I don't think so, I don't think that character exists...If you Google 'Rilo Kiley,' you will just come back with a lot of pictures of us." On how this imaginary name became the name for the band: "I wrote it down on a blotter, an office desk when I woke up, and, I don't know, I came back to it when we were trying to think of a name, and we thought we'd use that for one show then change it, 'cause who'd want that name? Who can remember that anyway?"

In 2005, Sennett told the teletext magazine Planet Sound that the name came from a Scottish athlete. On a 2005 episode of the MSNBC entertainment show MSNBC Entertainment Hot List, the female host stated that the name came from "old Scottish sports almanacs." In the following interview segment, Sennett stated, "We just looked in there, and the name of one of the star players from the turn of the century was Rilo Kiley."

In an interview published in Q magazine in September 2007, Sennett stated that Rilo Kiley is named after a character he'd met in a dream who had predicted the date of Jenny Lewis' death.

== Band members ==
Current line-up

- Jenny Lewis – lead vocals, keyboards, rhythm guitar, bass (1998–2013, 2025–present)
- Blake Sennett – lead guitar, keyboards, backing and occasional lead vocals (1998–2013, 2025–present)
- Pierre de Reeder – bass, rhythm guitar, backing vocals (1998–2013, 2025–present)
- Jason Boesel – drums, percussion (2001–2013, 2025–present)

Current touring musicians

- Harrison Whitford – rhythm guitar, keyboards (2025–present)

Former members

- Dave Rock – drums, percussion (1998–2001)
- Mike Bloom – pedal steel, additional guitars (2004–2005)

== Discography ==
- Take Offs and Landings (2001)
- The Execution of All Things (2002)
- More Adventurous (2004)
- Under the Blacklight (2007)

== Videography ==
- "The Frug" (1999, directed by Morgan J. Freeman)
- "Wires and Waves" (2001 unreleased, 2007 released, directed by Morgan J. Freeman)
- "Bulletproof" (2001, directed by Liam Lynch)
- "Portions for Foxes" (2004, directed by Brian Lazzaro)
- "It's a Hit" (2005, directed by Andrew Bruntel, Matt Enlow)
- "The Moneymaker" (2007, directed by Autumn de Wilde)
- "Silver Lining" (2007, directed by Autumn de Wilde)
- "Let Me Back In" (2013, directed by Rilo Kiley)
- "Emotional" (2013, directed by Austin Nagler)

== See also ==
- Bright Eyes
- The Postal Service
- The Elected
- Mike Bloom
- The Watson Twins
- Conor Oberst and the Mystic Valley Band
- Johnathan Rice
- Night Terrors of 1927
- Nice as Fuck
