= Jenny Lewis discography =

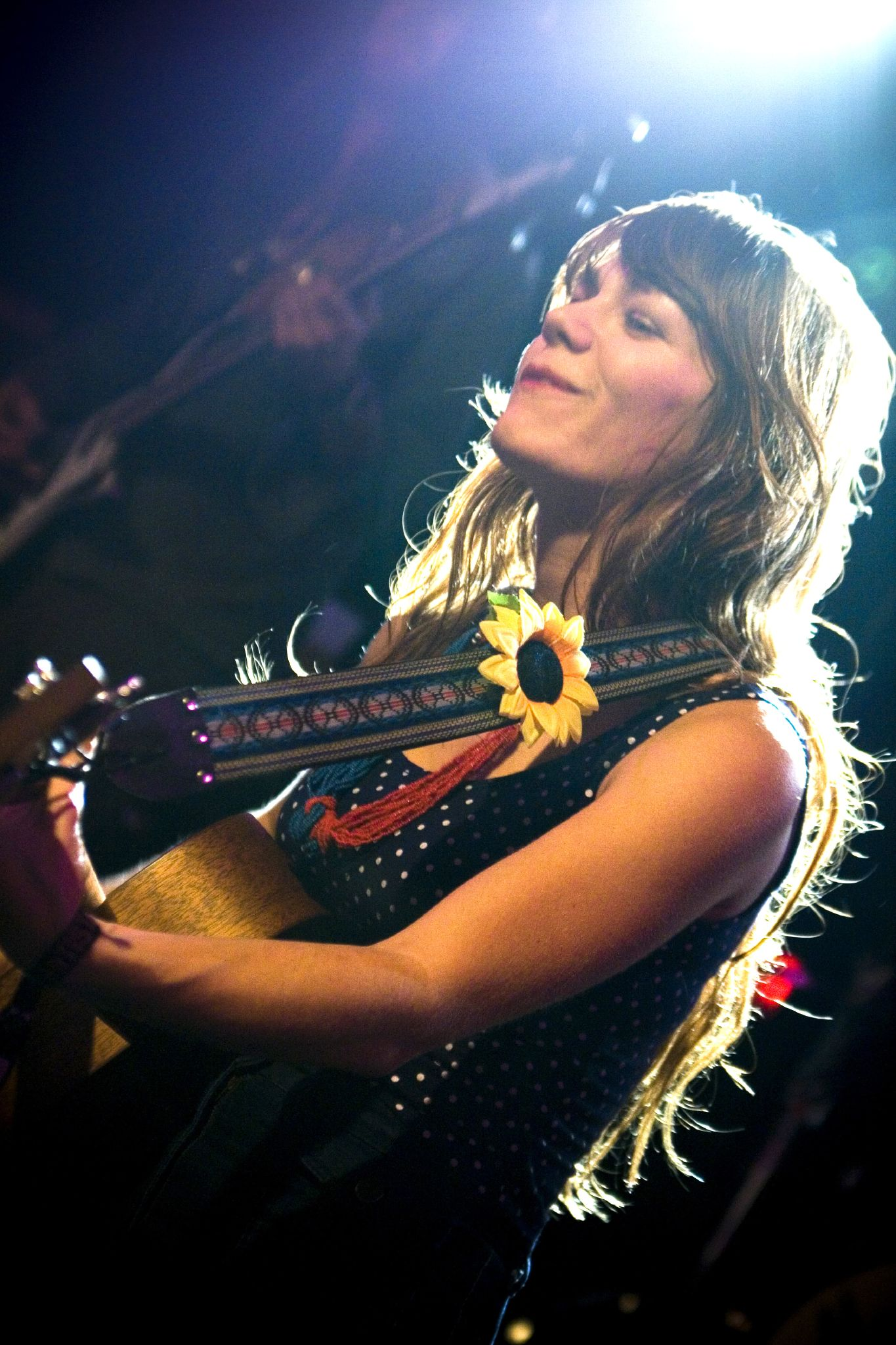
- Lewis performing in 2008
- Studio albums: 5
- Extended plays: 2
- Soundtrack albums: 2
- Live albums: 1
- Singles: 29
- Music videos: 19
- Collaborative albums: 2

This is a comprehensive listing of official releases by Jenny Lewis, lead singer of the band Rilo Kiley.

== Albums ==
=== Studio albums ===
| Title | Details | Peak chart positions | | | | | | | | | Sales |
| Title | Details | US | US Rock | US Alt. | US Dig. | US Vinyl | US Ind. | US Tm. | UK | NOR | Sales |
|---|---|---|---|---|---|---|---|---|---|---|---|
| Rabbit Fur Coat | Released: January 24, 2006; Label: Team Love; Formats: LP, CD, digital download | 88 | — | — | 20 | — | 6 | 3 | 63 | 32 | US: 127,000 |
| Acid Tongue | Released: September 22, 2008; Label: Warner Bros., Rough Trade; Formats: LP, CD, digital download | 24 | 10 | — | 11 | — | — | 4 | 55 | — | US: 21,000+ |
| The Voyager | Released: July 29, 2014; Label: Warner Bros.; Formats: LP, CD, digital download | 9 | 5 | 2 | 9 | 1 | — | 3 | 47 | — | US: 24,000+ |
| On the Line | Released: March 22, 2019; Label: Warner Bros.; Formats: LP, CD, digital download | 34 | 4 | 2 | 4 | 1 | — | 1 | 27 | — | |
| Joy'All | Released: June 9, 2023; Label: Blue Note; Formats: LP, CD, digital download | 147 | 24 | 15 | — | 9 | — | 6 | — | — | |

=== Collaborative albums ===
| Artist: Title | Details | Peak Billboard charts positions | | | | | | |
| Artist: Title | Details | US | Rock | Alt. | Dig. | Ind. | Tm. | Heat |
|---|---|---|---|---|---|---|---|---|
| Jenny and Johnny: I'm Having Fun Now | Released: August 31, 2010; Label: Warner Bros.; Formats: LP, CD, digital download | 37 | 13 | 7 | 13 | — | 3 | — |
| Nice As Fuck: Nice As Fuck | Released: June 24, 2016 (digital), August 31, 2016 (vinyl); Label: Loves Way; Formats: LP, limited edition pink LP, digital download | — | 25 | 18 | — | 15 | — | 4 |

=== Live albums ===
| Artist: Title | Details |
|---|---|
| Jenny and Johnny: Live at Third Man Records | Recorded: September 26, 2010; Label: Third Man; Formats: LP, limited edition black/blue LP |

== Extended Plays ==
| Year | Title: Track List | Details |
|---|---|---|
| 2024 | Puppy and a Truck: A side: Puppy and a Truck/Puppy and a Truck (Live at Eastside Bowl); B side: Psychos/Giddy Up | Released: April 20, 2024; Label: Blue Note Records; Formats: Record Store Day limited edition vinyl picture disc EP |
| 2025 | Choo (w/ Serengeti): A side: Ublu/Vroom Vroom/Idiot; B side: Gltr/Wtch/Choo | Released: January, 2025; Label: Othar; Formats: limited edition purple 12” vinyl compilation EP |

== Singles ==
| Year | Title | Album | B-Side | Peak Billboard charts positions | | |
| Year | Title | Album | B-Side | AAA | US Rock | Rock Airplay |
|---|---|---|---|---|---|---|
| 2006 | "Rise Up With Fists" | Rabbit Fur Coat | "Paradise" | — | — | — |
| 2006 | "You Are What You Love" | Rabbit Fur Coat | "Fireplace" | — | — | — |
| 2006 | "Paradise" | Non-album track | "Hometown" split w/ (Whispertown 2000) | — | — | — |
| 2008 | "The Next Messiah (Part 1)" | Acid Tongue | "The Next Messiah (Part 2)" | — | — | — |
| 2008 | "Godspeed" | Acid Tongue | | — | — | — |
| 2009 | "Carpetbaggers" | Acid Tongue | "Go Away" (Elvis Costello with Jenny Lewis) | — | — | — |
| 2014 | "Just One of the Guys" | The Voyager | "The Voyager" | 13 | 17 | 18 |
| 2014 | "The Voyager" | The Voyager | | — | — | — |
| 2014 | "She's Not Me" | The Voyager | | — | — | — |
| 2014 | "Just One of the Guys" (Pax-Am Sessions) | Non-album track | "You Can't Outrun 'Em" (Pax-Am Sessions) | — | — | — |
| 2019 | "Red Bull & Hennessy" | On the Line | | 10 | — | — |
| 2019 | "Heads Gonna Roll" | On the Line | | — | — | — |
| 2019 | "Wasted Youth" | On the Line | | 40 | — | — |
| 2019 | On the iPhone "Rabbit Hole (Demo)” | Non-album track | “Standing in the Doorway (Demo)” | — | — | — |
| 2021 | "Puppy and a Truck" | Joy'All | | — | — | — |
| 2023 | "Psychos" | Joy'All | | 1 | — | — |
| 2023 | "Giddy Up" | Joy'All | | — | — | — |
| 2023 | "Cherry Baby" | Joy'All | | 19 | — | — |
| 2023 | "Puppy and a Truck (Live at Eastside Bowl)" | Non-album track | | — | — | — |

=== Collaborative singles ===
| Year | Title | Artist: Album | B-Side |
|---|---|---|---|
| 2010 | "Big Wave" | Jenny and Johnny: I'm Having Fun Now | "Big Wave" |
| 2010 | "Scissor Runner" | Jenny and Johnny: I'm Having Fun Now | "Switchblade" |
| 2010 | "Animal" | Jenny and Johnny: I'm Having Fun Now | "Mars Shuffle" |
| 2010 | "Just Like Zeus" | Jenny and Johnny: I'm Having Fun Now | "Slave Driver (DNTEL Mix)" |
| 2011 | "Love Hurts" | Jenny and Johnny: Non-album track | "Love Hurts" split w/ Gram Parsons, Emmylou Harris & The Fallen Angels |
| 2016 | "Door" | Nice As Fuck: Nice As Fuck | |
| 2020 | "Unblu” | with Serengeti: Non-album track | |
| 2021 | "Vroom Vroom” | with Serengeti: Non-album track | |
| 2021 | "Idiot” | with Serengeti: Non-album track | |
| 2021 | "Gltr” | with Serengeti: Non-album track | |

== Music videos ==
| Year | Title | Director |
|---|---|---|
| 2006 | "Rise Up With Fists" with The Watson Twins | Autumn de Wilde |
| 2009 | "Black Sand" | Justin Mitchell |
| 2009 | "See Fernando" | Alan Tanner |
| 2009 | "Carpetbaggers" | Justin Mitchell |
| 2011 | "Big Wave" (Jenny and Johnny) | Autumn de Wilde |
| 2014 | "Just One of the Guys" | Jenny Lewis |
| 2015 | "She's Not Me" | Jenny Lewis |
| 2016 | "Door" (Nice As Fuck) | Jenny Lewis |
| 2016 | "Guns" (Nice As Fuck) | Luke Rathborne |
| 2019 | "Red Bull & Hennessy" | Eric Notarnicola |
| 2019 | "Rabbit Hole” | Eric Notarnicola |
| 2019 | "Lapé, Lanmou (Peace and Love)" with Jonathan Wilson, Sanba Zao, and Jackson Browne | Artists for Peace and Justice |
| 2020 | "Under the Supermoon” with Habib Koité | David Belle |
| 2020 | "Unblu" with Serengeti | Jenny Lewis |
| 2021 | "Vroom Vroom" with Serengeti | Jenny Lewis |
| 2021 | "Idiot" with Serengeti | Jenny Lewis |
| 2021 | "Gltr" with Serengeti | Jenny Lewis |
| 2023 | "Puppy and a Truck" | Jenny Lewis and Bobbi Rich |
| 2023 | "Psychos" | Bobbi Rich |

== Soundtracks ==
=== Contributions ===
| Year | Song title | Soundtrack |
|---|---|---|
| 2008 | "Barking at the Moon", "Home at Last / Barking at the Moon (Reprise)" | Bolt Original Soundtrack |
| 2011 | "Bad Man's World" | The Hangover Part II: Original Motion Picture Soundtrack |
| 2013 | "Don't Let Me Be Misunderstood" (and Eric Burdon) | True Blood (Music from the HBO Original Series Vol. 4) |
| 2014 | "Completely Not Me" | Girls Volume 2: All Adventurous Women Do... Music from the HBO Original Series |

=== Film score composer ===
| Year | Film Title | Notes |
|---|---|---|
| 2013 | Very Good Girls | also Music Supervisor |
| 2014 | Song One | also Music Producer with Johnathan Rice |

== Guest appearances and collaborations ==
| Year | Title | Artist | Album |
|---|---|---|---|
| 2002 | "The Big Picture" | Bright Eyes | Lifted or The Story Is in the Soil... |
| 2003 | "The District Sleeps Alone Tonight" | The Postal Service | Give Up |
| 2003 | "Sleeping In" | The Postal Service | Give Up |
| 2003 | "Recycled Air" | The Postal Service | Give Up |
| 2003 | "Clark Gable" | The Postal Service | Give Up |
| 2003 | "We Will Become Silhouettes" | The Postal Service | Give Up |
| 2003 | "Brand New Colony" | The Postal Service | Give Up |
| 2003 | "The Recluse" | Cursive | The Ugly Organ |
| 2003 | "Bloody Murderer" | Cursive | The Ugly Organ |
| 2003 | "Sierra" | Cursive | The Ugly Organ |
| 2004 | "Greetings in Braille" | The Elected | Me First |
| 2004 | "Inmates" | The Good Life | Album of the Year |
| 2005 | "Catch My Disease" | Ben Lee | Awake Is the New Sleep |
| 2005 | "Big Boat" | M. Ward | Transistor Radio |
| 2005 | "Behind the Frontlines" | Johnathan Rice | Trouble Is Real |
| 2005 | "Do They Know It's Hallowe'en" | North American Hallowe'en Prevention Initiative | UNICEF charity single |
| 2005 | "Napoleon's Hat" | Bright Eyes | Lagniappe |
| 2006 | "Fireflies in a Steel Mill" | The Elected | Sun, Sun, Sun |
| 2006 | "It Was Love" | The Elected | Sun, Sun, Sun |
| 2006 | "The Bank and Trust" | The Elected | Sun, Sun, Sun |
| 2006 | "You Again" | James Figurine | Mistake Mistake Mistake Mistake |
| 2006 | "What'll I Do?" | The Watson Twins | Southern Manners |
| 2006 | "Intentions" | Whispertown2000 | Livin' in a Dream |
| 2006 | "Through a Hole" | Whispertown2000 | Livin' in a Dream |
| 2006 | "Lean Back" | Whispertown2000 | Livin' in a Dream |
| 2007 | "Roll On" | Dntel | Dumb Luck |
| 2007 | "Summer in the City" | VietNam | VietNam |
| 2007 | "We're All Stuck Out in the Desert" | Johnathan Rice | Further North |
| 2007 | "End of the Affair" | Johnathan Rice | Further North |
| 2007 | "THC" | Johnathan Rice | Further North |
| 2007 | "It Couldn't Be Me" | Johnathan Rice | Further North |
| 2007 | "Giving It Up" | Johnathan Rice | Further North |
| 2007 | "Hard To Believe" | Johnathan Rice | Further North |
| 2007 | "It Is Best to Keep It All Inside" | Johnathan Rice | Further North |
| 2008 | "No Hiding Place" | Elvis Costello and the Imposters | Momofuku |
| 2008 | "Turpentine" | Elvis Costello and the Imposters | Momofuku |
| 2008 | "Drum & Bone" | Elvis Costello and the Imposters | Momofuku |
| 2008 | "Song with Rose" | Elvis Costello and the Imposters | Momofuku |
| 2008 | "Go Away" | Elvis Costello and the Imposters | Momofuku |
| 2008 | "Atlantis" | Whispertown2000 | Swim |
| 2010 | "Hard Enough" | Brandon Flowers | Flamingo |
| 2011 | "Butcher's Paper" | Mike Bloom | King Of Circles |
| 2011 | "Ride Ride Ride" | Vetiver | The Errant Charm |
| 2013 | "Afraid of Heights" | Wavves | Afraid of Heights |
| 2013 | "Hippies Is Punks" | Wavves | Afraid of Heights |
| 2013 | "Lou Rider" | Johnathan Rice | Good Graces |
| 2015 | "Bulb Went Black" | Written with Johnathan Rice, performed by Johnny Flynn | Song One Soundtrack |
| 2015 | "In April" | Written with Johnathan Rice, performed by Johnny Flynn | Song One Soundtrack |
| 2015 | "Iris, Instilled" | Written with Johnathan Rice, performed by Johnny Flynn | Song One Soundtrack |
| 2015 | "Big Black Cadillac" | Written with Johnathan Rice, performed by Johnny Flynn | Song One Soundtrack |
| 2015 | "Little Yellow Dress" | Written with Johnathan Rice, performed by Johnny Flynn | Song One Soundtrack |
| 2015 | "Silver Song" | Written with Johnathan Rice, performed by Johnny Flynn | Song One Soundtrack |
| 2015 | "Marble Song" | Written with Johnathan Rice, performed by Ben Rosenfield | Song One Soundtrack |
| 2015 | "Cold One" | Written with Johnathan Rice, performed by Meryl Streep | Ricki and the Flash Soundtrack |
| 2016 | "Sugaree" | Phosphorescent & Friends | Day of the Dead |
| 2016 | "Cassidy" | Moses Sumney & Friends | Day of the Dead |
| 2016 | "High Flying Faith" | EZTV | High in Place |
| 2016 | "Winter Wonderland" | She & Him | Christmas Party |
| 2017 | "Glass Jar" | Tristen | Sneaker Waves |
| 2017 | "Bum Me Out" | Jessica Lea Mayfield | Sorry Is Gone |
| 2017 | "Pills" | St. Vincent | Masseduction |
| 2017 | "Sorrow" | Paul Shaffer & The World's Most Dangerous Band | Paul Shaffer & The World's Most Dangerous Band |
| 2018 | "Thru the Cracks" | King Tuff | The Other |
| 2020 | "Lapé, Lanmou" w/ Jonathan Wilson & Sanba Zao | Artists for Peace and Justice w/ Jackson Browne (producer) | Let the Rhythm Lead: Haiti Song Summit, Vol. 1 |
| 2020 | "Under the Supermoon" w/ Habib Koité | Artists for Peace and Justice w/ Jackson Browne (producer) | Let the Rhythm Lead: Haiti Song Summit, Vol. 1 |

== Rilo Kiley ==
- Take-Offs and Landings (2001)
- The Execution of All Things (2002)
- More Adventurous (2004)
- Under the Blacklight (2007)

== See also ==
- Rilo Kiley
- Rilo Kiley discography
- Blake Sennett
- The Elected
- The Postal Service
