= Jason Lader =

American record producer (born 1979)

- Born: February 1, 1979 (age 47); Los Angeles, California, U.S
- Origin: New York
- Occupations: Record producer, audio engineer

Jason Lader (born February 1, 1979) is an American record producer, audio engineer, and mixer from New York. He is also known for playing bass guitar, keyboards, piano, guitar, and as a programmer. He was a member of the band Furslide, and has since worked with Howard Benson, Raine Maida, and Rick Rubin, among others.

== Discography ==
=== As producer ===
- For the Kids (produced "Bright Eyes" by Remy Zero)
- Nightmare of You by Nightmare of You
- Men, Women & Children by Men, Women & Children (co-produced "Photosynthesis (We're Losing O²)", "Who Found Mister Fabulous?", "Messy", and "Vowels")
- Under the Blacklight by Rilo Kiley (produced "Silver Lining", "Close Call", "The Moneymaker", "Breakin' Up", and "Dreamworld")
- Further North by Johnathan Rice
- "Makes Me Wonder" by Maroon 5 (produced "The Way I Was" and "Story")
- "Won't Go Home Without You" by Maroon 5 (produced "Miss You, Love You")
- Songs About Jane: 10th Anniversary Edition by Maroon 5
- VietNam by VietNam
- Acid Tongue by Jenny Lewis
- Lenka by Lenka (produced "Live Like You're Dying")
- Momofuku by Elvis Costello and the Imposters
- Give Up the Ghost by Brandi Carlile
- Phrazes for the Young by Julian Casablancas
- Last Night on Earth by Noah and the Whale
- Curve by Our Lady Peace
- "Friend Inside" by Bag Raiders (produced "Footprints")
- "Waterfalls" by Bag Raiders (produced "Waterfalls" and "Vapor Trails")
- Dopamine by Third Eye Blind (produced "Everything Is Easy", "Get Me Out of Here", and "Blade")
- "Checkmate" by Bag Raiders

=== As mixer ===
- For the Kids (mixed "Bright Eyes" by Remy Zero)
- De-Loused in the Comatorium by The Mars Volta (mixed "Ambuletz")
- Crunk Juice by Lil Jon and the East Side Boyz (mixed "Stop Fuckin' wit Me")
- Music from and Inspired by Spider-Man 2 (mixed "Someone to Die For" by Jimmy Gnecco featuring Brian May)
- Nightmare of You by Nightmare of You
- Further North by Johnathan Rice
- Under the Blacklight by Rilo Kiley (mixed "Silver Lining", "Close Call", "The Moneymaker", "Breakin' Up", and "Dreamworld")
- "Makes Me Wonder" by Maroon 5 (mixed "The Way I Was" and "Story")
- "Won't Go Home Without You" by Maroon 5 (mixed "Miss You, Love You")
- VietNam by VietNam
- Acid Tongue by Jenny Lewis
- Mercy (Dancing for the Death of an Imaginary Enemy) by Ours
- Momofuku by Elvis Costello and the Imposters
- Seeing Things by Jakob Dylan
- Give Up the Ghost by Brandi Carlile (mixed "That Year", "Caroline", "Before It Breaks", "I Will", "If There Was No You", and "Touching the Ground")
- The Crying Light by Antony and the Johnsons (mixed "Daylight and the Sun")
- Charlatans at the Garden Gate by Tristen
- The Lost Notebooks of Hank Williams (mixed "Oh, Mama, Come Home" by Jakob Dylan)
- "On'n'On" by Justice (mixed "On'n'On" (by Rick Rubin))
- Star Wars Headspace (mixed "NR-G7" by Rick Rubin)
- Reality Awaits by the Strokes

=== Additional contributions ===
- Adventure by Furslide (music writer on "Skinny Girl" and "Today Forever")
- This Day by John Brown's Body (engineer on "Rip the Curtain")
- The Golden Hum by Remy Zero (additional musician, digital engineer)
- For the Kids (additional musician on "Bright Eyes" by Remy Zero)
- Silence by Blindside (digital editor)
- Babylon by Skindred (digital editor)
- Darkhorse by Crazy Town (digital editor)
- Shaman by Santana (digital editor on "America")
- Year of the Spider by Cold (digital editor)
- The Black Album by Jay-Z (programmer on "99 Problems")
- Crunk Juice by Lil Jon and the East Side Boyz (engineer on "Stop Fuckin' wit Me")
- Armed Love by The (International) Noise Conspiracy (additional engineering)
- Breakaway by Kelly Clarkson (bass on "Where Is Your Heart" and "Walk Away")
- Love. Angel. Music. Baby. by Gwen Stefani (programmer and additional engineering on "Luxurious", programmer on "Cool", "The Real Thing", and "Danger Zone" )
- Speak by Lindsay Lohan (programmer and keyboards on "First", "Nobody 'Til You", and "Anything But Me", programmer on "Speak")
- Music from and Inspired by Spider-Man 2 (engineer on "Someone to Die For" by Jimmy Gnecco featuring Brian May)
- Under My Skin by Avril Lavigne (bass, digital editor, and programmer on "How Does It Feel", "Who Knows", "Fall to Pieces", and "Slipped Away", digital editor on "He Wasn't")
- Hypnotize by System of a Down (editor)
- Mezmerize by System of a Down (editor)
- Red, White & Crüe by Mötley Crüe (digital engineer on "If I Die Tomorrow", "Sick Love Song", and "Street Fighting Man")
- On a Search in America by Dizmas (digital editor)
- Are You Thinking What I'm Thinking? by The Like (additional engineering)
- The Secret Life Of... by The Veronicas (additional engineering on "Revolution")
- Healthy in Paranoid Times by Our Lady Peace (digital engineer, digital editor)
- 12 Songs by Neil Diamond (engineer)
- Love Hope Hero by Raine Maida (additional engineering)
- FutureSex/LoveSounds by Justin Timberlake (engineer on "(Another Song) All Over Again")
- Ghost Stories by Chantal Kreviazuk (bass on "All I Can Do", "Waiting for the Sun", and "Grow Up So Fast", additional engineering)
- Nightmare of You by Nightmare of You (engineer)
- Stadium Arcadium by Red Hot Chili Peppers (additional engineering)
- Free Life by Dan Wilson (bass on "Against History")
- It Won't Be Soon Before Long by Maroon 5 (additional arrangements on "Kiwi")
- "Makes Me Wonder" by Maroon 5 (engineer on "The Way I Was" and "Story")
- Long Road Out of Eden by Eagles (additional engineering)
- Under the Blacklight (engineer on "Silver Lining", "Close Call", "The Moneymaker", "Breakin' Up", and "Dreamworld", additional musician)
- VietNam by VietNam (engineer, additional musician)
- Viva la Vida or Death and All His Friends by Coldplay (assistant engineer)
- Acid Tongue by Jenny Lewis (bass on "Black Sand", "Bad Man's World", and "Sing a Song for Them")
- The Cross of My Calling by The (International) Noise Conspiracy (additional engineering)
- Home Before Dark by Neil Diamond (additional engineering)
- Midnight Boom by The Kills (engineer on "Tape Song")
- Prospekt's March by Coldplay (assistant engineer)
- Momofuku by Elvis Costello and the Imposters (engineer, studio photography)
- Seeing Things by Jakob Dylan (engineer)
- Give Up the Ghost by Brandi Carlile (synthesizer on "That Year", engineer)
- Phrazes for the Young by Julian Casablancas (performer)
- Illuminations by Josh Groban (engineer)
- The Lost Notebooks of Hank Williams (engineer on "Oh, Mama, Come Home" by Jakob Dylan)
- Last Night on Earth by Noah and the Whale (engineer, performer)
- Paradise by Lana Del Rey (bass and engineer on "Ride")
- "On'n'On" by Justice (additional instrumentation on "On'n'On" (Ruined by Rick Rubin))
- La Futura by ZZ Top (additional engineer)
- Curve by Our Lady Peace (additional keyboards on "Heavyweight" and "As Fast as You Can")
- The Hunger Games: Catching Fire – Original Motion Picture Soundtrack (guitar, bass, keyboards, and engineer on "Devil May Cry" by The Weeknd)
- The Marshall Mathers LP 2 by Eminem (digital editor and engineer on "Rhyme or Reason", "Berzerk", "So Far...", and "Love Game", guitar and keyboards on "Berzerk" and "So Far...", bass on "So Far...")
- Artpop by Lady Gaga (digital editor, keyboards, and engineer on "Dope")
- Shangi La by Jake Bugg (bass, piano, baritone guitar, editor)
- That Girl by Jennifer Nettles (bass)
- x by Ed Sheeran (bass, engineer, and keyboards on "Don't", keyboards and engineer on "Bloodstream" and "Tenerife Sea")
- The Voyager by Jenny Lewis (additional engineering)
- Tyranny by The Voidz (writer on "Nintendo Blood")
- A Better Tomorrow by Wu-Tang Clan (editor, additional engineering, and additional keys on "Ruckus in B Minor")
- Angus & Julia Stone by Angus & Julia Stone (bass)
- My Favourite Faded Fantasy by Damien Rice (engineer on "The Greatest Bastard" and "Trusty and True")
- Dopamine by Third Eye Blind (engineer on "Get Me Out of Here" and "Blade")
- Star Wars Headspace (writer, composer, and engineer on "NR-G7" by Rick Rubin)
- The Colour in Anything by James Blake (modular synthesizer on "Points", recording engineer)
- Hard Sail by Chantal Kreviazuk (sound designer on "Meant for This")
- True Sadness by The Avett Brothers (additional engineering, drum programming, electric guitar, synthesizer, bass)
- Blonde by Frank Ocean (recording engineer)
- Oh, vita! by Jovanotti (recording engineer)
