= Cold One (disambiguation) =

"Cold One" is a song by Eric Church.

Cold One or variation, may refer also to:

- slang term for beer or any chilled alcoholic beverage
- "Cold One", song by Lou Barlow from Reason to Live (album)
- "Cold One", track from Madvillainy 2: The Madlib Remix
- "Cold One", song for Ricki and the Flash written by Jenny Lewis with Johnathan Rice and performed by Meryl Streep

== See also ==
- "The Cold One", episode of Lawman
- The Cold One, album by DMBQ
