= Acid Tongue =

Studio album by Jenny Lewis
- Released: September 23, 2008
- Recorded: December 2007–March 2008; Sound City Studios, Van Nuys
- Genres: Indie rock, alternative country
- Length: 47:24
- Labels: Warner Bros., Rough Trade
- Producers: Jenny Lewis, Johnathan Rice, Dave Scher, Jason Lader

Jenny Lewis chronology
Rabbit Fur Coat (2006)	Acid Tongue (2008)	The Voyager (2014)

Singles from Acid Tongue
- 1. "Carpetbaggers" Released: October 28, 2008; 2. "Godspeed" Released: December 1, 2008; 3. "The Next Messiah" Released: 2008

Acid Tongue is the debut solo album, second overall by American singer-songwriter Jenny Lewis, released in September 2008 through Warner Bros. and Rough Trade Records. Inspired by jam sessions, the album was recorded December 2007-March 2008 in Van Nuys, California with the intent of capturing a more live feeling than 2006's Rabbit Fur Coat. Lewis worked with a number of guest musicians and wrote the album with boyfriend Johnathan Rice. Lewis, Rice, Jason Lader, and Dave Scher produced the album. Acid Tongue features musical styles ranging from indie rock to alternative country and Americana.

Acid Tongue was released to generally favorable reviews from contemporary music critics, receiving praise for Lewis' lyrics and vocals. However, some reviewers criticized the numerous collaborations and felt the sound overwhelmed Lewis. The album charted at number twenty-two in the United States and number fifty-five in the United Kingdom.

== Influences and recording ==
Lewis first began work on Acid Tongue after writing the title track on her Rabbit Fur Coat tour. She attempted to work out an arrangement for Rilo Kiley's Under the Blacklight. It did not work, so Lewis recorded it for a second solo album.

According to the Los Angeles Times, Lewis was inspired by house parties at Jonathan Wilson's Laurel Canyon home. "We'd go to these jams in the canyon. They're fantastic. Jonathan invites older session musicians from the real Laurel Canyon era, and younger people who are just starting their bands who happen to live in the canyon, and we all get together and sing Grateful Dead covers and J. J. Cale songs." Lewis herself has said that it "rocks a little harder," in contrast to Rabbit Fur Coat's folk rock influences. Lewis also used Rilo Kiley's Under the Blacklight, which was notably polished compared to the band's earlier work, "as a reference point to go in the complete opposite direction". She explained that every song she writes is "a response to the thing that I've written before". "It's even as simple as, 'OK, I've written a ballad, now I want to push myself to write something that's up tempo.' If I'm writing about myself, well, that subject can be tiresome, so then I focus on character-driven songs. So I'm always doing this back-and-forth just to keep myself interested."

The album was recorded in just three weeks at Sound City Studios in Van Nuys, California. The album was co-produced by Lewis's boyfriend Johnathan Rice, former Beachwood Sparks and All Night Radio member Dave Scher, and Under the Blacklight producer Jason Lader. Lewis attempted to record as many of the songs live as possible. "We did it in the studio for my 32nd birthday," according to Lewis, "and we had a great time, collaborating with a bunch of friends. It was definitely a lot less focused than Rabbit Fur Coat. With that record I had a very specific vision, [...] but with this record it was really more about the vibe, the songs and the collaborations". A source quoted by Entertainment Weekly said that the album "all sounds super natural, nice, and simple. Like it doesn't belong in any decade. It's just timeless." The album was inspired by a variety of musical styles, including alternative country, Americana, indie rock, and soul.

Talking to Nashville Scene, Lewis said that the songs "weren't written off-the-cuff, but they were definitely recorded, not carelessly, but with a real effort to capture a live feeling, particularly with the vocals". Lewis continued, "To me, it's a big step in a different direction...and to be able to sink into the vocal take while the band was playing was a very liberating experience for me." Lewis told The A.V. Club, "We played them on the road 100 times, so we knew that we could walk into the studio and record them the same way. [...] It wasn't really a studio record, but more of a live record in some ways. It was about getting the band together and creating an atmosphere that lent itself to good chemistry between the band members and trying to capture as much of the record live as we could." As "a child of digital generation", Lewis had generally worked with Pro Tools, but wanted to capture the "not-perfect sound" of some of her favorite records.

The musicians were split into two separate bands. The Band A setup (Jason Boesel, Davey Faragher, Johnathan Rice, and Blake Mills) would generally play the more rock and roll songs, while Band B would play the ballads.

== Composition ==
The album's title track was described by Lewis as her "thinly veiled way of getting out of writing a strictly 'confessional' song," Lewis told Greg Kot of the Chicago Tribune. "I may be a liar, or I may not be one." The song also referenced a childhood experience of Lewis', in which she experienced LSD at the age of 14.

"The Next Messiah", a nine-minute "ode to Barbra Streisand and the devil," was "tracked completely live, with all the transitions, and it's the most exciting thing I've ever been involved with in the studio. I wish the rest of the record had been more like that." The song is "actually three different songs that Johnathan Rice and myself wrote together," according to Lewis. "I happen to be a Barbra Streisand fan, and Barbra Streisand fancies a medley, so we discussed stringing the three songs together."

The album features a duet with Elvis Costello, "Carpetbaggers". The song was written by Lewis' boyfriend, Johnathan Rice, to be performed on the Rabbit Fur Coat tour, because they were lacking uptempo songs. Lewis wanted to "make it less country and a little more pop. So I emailed Elvis. He mentioned he had two new songs and would we be open to recording them." These songs became part of Costello's Momofuku.

She & Him's Zooey Deschanel provides backing vocals on a number of songs, while her bandmate M. Ward plays "a moody guitar part" on "Pretty Bird". Ward said that Acid Tongue is "the greatest record Jenny has ever made." There are a number of other collaborations on Acid Tongue; fellow Rilo Kiley member Jason Boesel, Davey Faragher of Costello's band The Imposters, Benji Hughes, Ana and Paz Lenchantin, Chris Robinson of The Black Crowes, and Jonathan Wilson all make contributions. The album features production credits from Lewis' boyfriend Johnathan Rice, Farmer Dave Scher, and Rilo Kiley producer Jason Lader.

Lewis's sister Leslie Lewis provides backing vocals on two tracks, while her father Eddie Gordon plays the bass harp and harmonica. "He was ill last year, so we started speaking to one another," Lewis told The Independent. "There were no hard feelings. He just wasn't around. Every couple of years I'd get a postcard from the road – a picture of him standing next to a giant ice-sculpture of a crab, in Alaska. He was a very mysterious character. But I thought this was the right time to bring him in." "The Next Messiah" was influenced by her father. "When someone isn't around you create what you imagine your father might be – 'a race-car driver, a four-leaf clover'," Lewis explained. Lewis has said that a lot of her inspiration, for both Acid Tongue and previous work, comes from her parents. Lewis also told The Independent, "I just don't know them very well. And I'm still trying to understand what happened [with the divorce] and why. It's this blank slate, I can't even remember what happened. But for some reason, these two people are so incredibly strange and funny and beautiful and messed up, that I want to keep writing about them... and maybe figure out who I am in the process."

== Release ==
Entertainment Weekly reported that Lewis had been working on the album in February 2008. Prior to Acid Tongue's release, Lewis allowed listeners to hear the title track by calling the toll-free telephone number 1-888-717-ACID. The song was later replaced by a recording announcing two "secret" performances in September, including a password and website to obtain tickets. Additionally, several videos were put up on Lewis' official YouTube page. The videos show Lewis (or bandmates) at home being visited by Ben Gibbard, of Death Cab for Cutie and The Postal Service, who has arrived with balloons to listen to the new album. Ben is told that the album is not out yet, but Lewis agrees to let him hear "just one song". This is followed by a recording of the title track "Acid Tongue."

On September 9, the entire album was made available in streaming format on Lewis' official MySpace page. Though not technically downloadable, it was quickly accessed through other means and made available through file sharing. The album was released in both CD and LP formats in a number of territories throughout late September. Select independent record stores also gave away a 7" single of "The Next Messiah", split between the two sides of the record. Lewis toured in support of the album's release, including an appearance at the Austin City Limits Festival and opening for Conor Oberst.

== Critical reception ==
Professional ratings
Aggregate scores
Source	Rating
Metacritic	75/100
Review scores
Source	Rating
AllMusic	4.5/5 stars
The A.V. Club	B+
Chicago Sun-Times	3.5/4 stars
Entertainment Weekly	A−
Mojo	4/5 stars
MSN Music (Consumer Guide)	B+
Pitchfork	6.0/10
Q	4/5 stars
Rolling Stone	4/5 stars
Spin	2.5/5 stars

Acid Tongue has received generally favorable reviews, scoring a 75 out of 100 on review aggregator Metacritic. Creative Loafing said that while Rabbit Fur Coat "glided through an Appalachian dream world", Lewis "stomps her boots while exploring similar terrain" on Acid Tongue. The review continued that while the album "includes plenty of quirky meditations on lost love that recall her previous adventures, [...] well-placed jolts give Acid Tongue greater balance, a component that's lacking on Rabbit Fur Coat." According to The Sunday Times, "the results are magnificent, [...] but occasionally they are a shaky misstep." Chicago Sun-Times writer Jim DeRogatis called Acid Tongue "sensual and entrancing." The Daily Trojan labeled the tracks as "psychedelic, occasionally sexy, but always timeless", although noting that the album "lacks a thematic focus that can be found on every other album Lewis has released".

Filter referred to the album's title track as "simply beautiful, causing goosebumps to the arms of even the toughest man. [...] It's rather deep, despite its simplicity, a difficult task to say the least." It has also been called "a prime example of Lewis' simplistic genius." The Times said "the verses in the title track tickle and tease so that you are practically salivating for the chorus."

It was also noted that Lewis' "delicately seductive vocals are more versatile", with the Detroit Free Press stating that her voice "smoothly mixes classic country with pop and indie-rock, Lewis is as adept on the ballads as she is on the rave-ups." The Times considered Lewis' songwriting "leagues ahead of anything that she has done in the past" and her vocals sound "as though she means it". DeRogatis pointed out that "Lewis' impressive strength as both a singer and a songwriter is that she makes every listener feel as if her music was crafted just for them." However, Angela Zimmerman of Crawdaddy! felt that Lewis often used a "pervasive soprano that she can't quite execute" on tracks like "Black Sand", "Pretty Bird", "Trying My Best to Love You", and "Jack Killed Mom".

Pitchfork said that while Acid Tongue is "immediately pleasurable," the album's downfall is that "Lewis does such a good job of nailing choice sounds and styles from pop's past that you can't help getting reeled in right away; only upon later reflection do you realize that much of her success lies in evoking something else great rather than achieving a greatness more uniquely her own." The review continued, "In these straitjacketed settings, Lewis' considerable strengths as a lyricist and performer just aren't given sufficient room to fully emerge." Time noted that Acid Tongue "sprawl with misplaced ambition" and that only the title track sticks. Another review observed, "Lewis seems to be [...] on her way to a more definitive musical existence [...] but she doesn’t quite seem to know yet." Acid Tongue was also slated for its "hip-hop-like roster of unnecessary cameos. Zooey Deschanel and M. Ward of She and Him make sense, but Elvis Costello sounds intrusive during his duet on "Carpetbaggers," while the black Crowes' Chris Robinson is just superfluous." Crawdaddy!'s Zimmerman said that while "these appearances help flavor the record, [...] I miss the Watson Twins."

The album was made number 14 in Blender's 33 Best Albums of 2008 list, and number 46 in Q's 50 Best Albums of the Year 2008. It was also voted number 18 in Rolling Stone's Readers' Top 30 Albums of 2008 list. "Acid Tongue" was number 66 on Rolling Stone's list of the 100 Best Songs of 2008.

== Track listing ==
No.	Title	Writer(s)	Length
1.	"Black Sand"	Jenny Lewis	2:53
2.	"Pretty Bird"	Lewis	3:46
3.	"The Next Messiah"	Lewis, Johnathan Rice	8:47
4.	"Bad Man's World"	Lewis, Rice	3:40
5.	"Acid Tongue"	Lewis	3:54
6.	"See Fernando"	Lewis	3:33
7.	"Godspeed"	Lewis	4:32
8.	"Carpetbaggers"	Rice	3:33
9.	"Trying My Best to Love You"	Lewis, Rice	3:07
10.	"Jack Killed Mom"	Lewis, Rice	5:27
11.	"Sing a Song for Them"	Lewis, Rice	4:09
12.	"The Highs and Lows of Being Number One" (Japanese bonus track)	Lewis, Rice	4:12
13.	"Pelican Bay" (iTunes/Japanese bonus track)	Lewis	3:09
Total length:			47:24

== Charts and certifications ==
Acid Tongue entered the Billboard 200 at number 24 with approximately 21,000 copies sold. It also reached number fifty-five on the UK Albums Chart.

Chart (2007)	Peak Position	Sales
UK Albums Chart	55	
US Billboard 200	24	21,000+

== Release history ==
Region	Date	Label	Format	Catalog
Australia	September 20, 2008	Rough Trade Records	CD	RTRADCD491
United Kingdom	September 22, 2008	Rough Trade Records	CD	RTRADCD491
United Kingdom	September 22, 2008	Rough Trade Records	LP	RTRADLP491
United States	September 23, 2008	Warner Bros. Records	CD	508668
United States	September 23, 2008	Warner Bros. Records	LP	508668
Hong Kong	September 26, 2008	Rough Trade Records	CD	RTRADCD491
Canada	September 30, 2008	Warner Music Canada	CD	2508668
Japan	November 26, 2008	Warner Music Group	CD	WPCB10098

== Personnel ==
- Production – Farmer Dave Scher, Jason Lader, Jenny Lewis, Johnathan Rice
- Artwork design – Jenny Lewis, Pierre De Reeder
- Photography — Autumn de Wilde

1. Black Sand
  - Jenny Lewis – main vocals, piano, vibraphone
  - Bobby Gruska – drums
  - Jason Lader – bass
  - Ana Lenchantin — cello
  - Paz Lenchantin — violin
  - Wes Precourt – violin
2. Pretty Bird
  - Jenny Lewis – main vocals
  - Bobby Gruska – drums
  - Johnathan Rice — background vocals
  - Farmer Dave Scher – background vocals
  - M. Ward — background vocals, guitar (acoustic and electric)
  - Jonathan Wilson — background vocals, bass
3. The Next Messiah
  - Jenny Lewis – main vocals
  - Jason Boesel — drums
  - Vanesa Corbala — background vocals
  - Zooey Deschanel — background vocals
  - Davey Faragher — bass
  - Blake Mills – electric guitar
  - Morgan Nagler — whispered vocals
  - Johnathan Rice – background vocals, acoustic guitar
  - Chris Robinson — background vocals
  - Farmer Dave Scher – background vocals
  - Jonathan Wilson – background vocals
4. Bad Man's World
  - Jenny Lewis – main vocals, piano
  - Bobby Gruska – drums
  - Jason Lader – bass
  - Ana Lenchantin – cello
  - Paz Lenchantin – violin
  - Wes Precourt – violin
  - Farmer Dave Scher – organ
5. Acid Tongue
  - Jenny Lewis – main vocals, acoustic guitar
  - Johnathan Rice – background vocals
  - Chris Robinson – background vocals
  - Farmer Dave Scher – background vocals
  - Jonathan Wilson – background vocals
6. See Fernando
  - Jenny Lewis – main vocals
  - Jason Boesel – drums
  - Vanesa Corbala – background vocals
  - Davey Faragher – bass
  - Leslie Lewis – background vocals
  - Johnathan Rice – acoustic and electric guitar
  - Farmer Dave Scher – steel guitar
1. Godspeed
  - Jenny Lewis – main vocals, piano
  - Bobby Gruska – drums
  - Ana Lenchantin – cello
  - Paz Lenchantin – violin
  - Wes Precourt – violin
  - Jonathan Wilson – bass
2. Carpetbaggers
  - Jenny Lewis – main vocals
  - Jason Boesel – drums
  - Vanesa Corbala – background vocals
  - Elvis Costello — vocals
  - Zooey Deschanel – background vocals
  - Davey Faragher – bass
  - Blake Mills – electric guitar
  - Johnathan Rice – acoustic guitar
3. Trying My Best to Love You
  - Jenny Lewis – main vocals, piano
  - Vanesa Corbala – background vocals
  - Zooey Deschanel – background vocals
  - Ana Lenchantin – cello
  - Leslie Lewis – background vocals
  - Paz Lenchantin – violin
  - Wes Precourt – violin
4. Jack Killed Mom
  - Jenny Lewis – main vocals, piano
  - Jason Boesel – drums, tambourine
  - Vanesa Corbala – background vocals
  - Zooey Deschanel – background vocals
  - Davey Faragher – bass
  - Eddie Gordon – harmonica
  - Benji Hughes – spoken word vocals
  - Blake Mills – background vocals
  - Farmer Dave Scher – omnichord
  - Tod Adrian Wisenbaker — electric guitar
5. Sing a Song For Them
  - Jenny Lewis – main vocals, piano, triangle
  - Bobby Gruska – drums
  - Jason Lader – bass
  - Ana Lenchantin – cello
  - Paz Lenchantin – violin
  - Blake Mills – electric guitar
  - Wes Precourt – violin
  - Johnathan Rice – acoustic guitar
  - Jenny's Birthday Party Patrons – group vocals
