= Song One =

2014 film directed by Kate Barker-Froyland

- Theatrical release poster
- Directed by: Kate Barker-Froyland
- Written by: Kate Barker-Froyland
- Produced by: Marc Platt; Jonathan Demme; Anne Hathaway; Adam Shulman; Christopher Woodrow; Molly Conners
- Starring: Anne Hathaway; Johnny Flynn; Ben Rosenfield; Mary Steenburgen
- Cinematography: John Guleserian
- Edited by: Madeleine Gavin
- Music by: Johnathan Rice; Jenny Lewis
- Production companies: Worldview Entertainment; Marc Platt Productions
- Distributed by: The Film Arcade; Cinedigm
- Release dates: January 20, 2014 (Sundance); January 23, 2015 (United States)
- Running time: 86 minutes
- Country: United States
- Language: English
- Budget: $6 million
- Box office: $408,918

Song One is a 2014 American romantic drama film written and directed by Kate Barker-Froyland in her directorial debut. The film stars Anne Hathaway, Johnny Flynn, Ben Rosenfield, and Mary Steenburgen. In the film, Franny Ellis returns home to New York City after her brother Henry enters a coma. She meets Henry's favorite musician, James Forester, at a concert. While trying to help Henry, Franny and James form a romantic connection during their brief time together.

Song One premiered at the 30th Sundance Film Festival on January 20, 2014, and opened in the United States on January 23, 2015, to mixed reviews from critics.

== Plot ==
Franny Ellis is an anthropology student doing her PhD thesis work in Morocco. She returns to her home in New York City after finding out that her brother Henry, a musician, is in a coma after getting hit by a car. She moves back in with her mother Karen after several years away. Franny listens to Henry's music and sits in his hospital room. She learns that Henry's favorite musician is British indie singer-songwriter James Forester and then attends James' concert, as he is touring in the area. Afterwards, she meets James and tells him about Henry. Franny starts to read Henry's journal and visit places that he goes to. James visits Franny and Henry at the hospital and plays a song for them. That night, Franny and James hang out. James says that his first album was successful but then he has not been able to write any new music since. Franny says that she and Henry had a fight about him pursuing music as a career and that she feels guilty because of it. They listen to live music. Franny buys a keyboard and a gramophone and takes them to the hospital. In Henry's room, she starts playing music and bringing over pancakes that he likes.

Franny and Karen celebrate Henry's half-birthday at the hospital, and James joins them. Franny and Karen argue about Franny not keeping in touch. Franny goes to James' concert that night, and afterwards, they have sex. They go out and record a song called "Afraid of Heights". The following night, James hangs out with Franny and Karen at their house. Franny and James go to a club and dance. The next day, James joins Franny and Henry at the hospital. James starts playing a new song, and Henry opens his eyes before closing them again. Henry then wakes up completely the next day. It is James' last day in the United States before he goes home. Franny tries to attend James' concert that night, but it is sold out. She watches him perform his new song on a television screen and then goes to his car. After the concert is over, James walks to his car and finds a CD there. It is a recording of him and Franny performing "Afraid of Heights". He listens to the song in his car as Franny also listens to it on her way home.

== Cast ==
- Anne Hathaway as Franny Ellis
- Johnny Flynn as James Forester
- Mary Steenburgen as Karen
- Ben Rosenfield as Henry Ellis
- Peter Francis James as Neurosurgeon
- Sharon Van Etten as herself
- Paul Whitty as Portuguese singer
- Lola Kirke as Rema
- Cass Dillon as Paul
- Naomi Shelton as herself
- Dan Deacon as himself
- Al Thompson as Andy
- Crystal Lonneberg as James' friend
- Stefano Villabona as Rock concert goer
- Steve Antonucci as Bartender
- Katrina Elizabeth Perkins as Hippie woman
- Monna Sabouri as Bedouin bride
- Walter DeForest as Handlebar moustache doorman
- J. Michael Kent as Tattooed hipster
- Jessamine Kelley as Tess

== Production ==
Initially, Franny was written as 24 years old. However, after Anne Hathaway (30 years old at the time) expressed her wish to play her, Barker-Froyland rewrote the part to be that of an older woman, which she said worked well for the script as it gave Franny more reason to not want to be a musician. Hathaway's previous film Les Misérables required her to adopt a shorter hairstyle than usual; rather than have her regrow the hair, the director incorporated it into the script.

Filming of Song One began in June 2013 in New York City.

== Soundtrack ==
Song One

Soundtrack album by various artists
- Released: January 13, 2015
- Recorded: New York
- Label: Lakeshore Records
- Producers: Jenny Lewis and Johnathan Rice

The soundtrack, released by Lakeshore Records on January 13, 2015, contained original scores written by Jenny Lewis and Johnathan Rice of the indie rock duo Jenny & Johnny. Barker-Froyland met with the duo in Los Angeles and, after she listened to "Little Yellow Dress" before her plane ride to New York, decided that they would create the songs that Flynn would perform in-character.

During production, Song One producer Jonathan Demme instructed Lewis and Rice to record its music as Skip Spence recorded his 1969 psychedelic album Oar. The duo wrote eleven songs for the film, and seven were used in its composition.

=== Track listing ===
No.	Title	Artist	Length
1.	"Bulb Went Black"	Johnny Flynn	3:09
2.	"Cumberland Gap"	The Felice Brothers	2:31
3.	"In April"	Flynn	3:12
4.	"One Day"	Sharon Van Etten	4:38
5.	"What Have You Done"	Naomi Shelton & The Gospel Queens	3:46
6.	"Iris, Instilled"	Flynn	2:44
7.	"I Need You"	America	3:06
8.	"The Crystal Cat"	Dan Deacon	3:50
9.	"Big Black Cadillac"	Flynn	2:30
10.	"My Baby Just Cares for Me"	Nina Simone	3:37
11.	"Little Yellow Dress"	Flynn	3:21
12.	"O Leãozinho"	Paul Whitty	2:30
13.	"Marble Song"	Ben Rosenfield	3:21
14.	"Afraid of Heights"	Flynn and Anne Hathaway	1:53
15.	"Silver Song"	Flynn	2:46

== Release ==
=== Box office ===
Song One premiered at the 30th Sundance Film Festival on January 20, 2014, in the U.S. Dramatic Competition. Later, the film opened in a limited release on January 23, 2015, with $20,200 in gross sales generated from 27 theaters in the United States. The film grossed $408,918 worldwide.

=== Critical reception ===
Song One received mixed reviews from critics. The review aggregator Rotten Tomatoes gives the film an approval rating of 34%, based on 50 reviews, with an average score of 5.29/10. The site's critical consensus reads, "Song One has plenty of earnest charm, but that isn't enough to overcome its slight, familiar story." The aggregator Metacritic gives the film a score of 48 out of 100, based on 23 critics, indicating "mixed or average reviews".
