= Nice as Fuck =

All-female indie-rock trio

- Genres: Indie rock, post-punk
- Years active: 2016
- Members: Jenny Lewis; Tennessee Thomas; Erika Forster

Nice as Fuck (NAF) was an all-female indie rock supergroup made up of Jenny Lewis (from Rilo Kiley), Erika Forster (of Au Revoir Simone), and Tennessee Thomas (of the Like). The band first performed at a rally for U.S. presidential candidate Bernie Sanders in April 2016 and went on to make their television debut in July 2016 on a live episode of The Late Show with Stephen Colbert during the 2016 Republican National Convention.

The band's self-titled first LP was released on June 24, 2016. The group toured with the Watson Twins and M. Ward.

In September 2026, the band announced a 10-year reunion tour titled "Back as Fuck" in 8 cities across the United States from Oct. 16-29 with supporting act DJ Alix Brown.

== Discography ==
=== Albums ===
- Nice as Fuck (2016)

=== Single ===
- "Door" (2016)

=== Music videos ===
- "Door" (2016)
- "Guns" (2016)
