= VietNam (album) =

Studio album by VietNam
- Released: January 23, 2007
- Recorded: Sound City and Sound Factory, Los Angeles, July–August, 2005
- Genres: Rock and Roll, Soul, Blues
- Length: 59:33
- Label: Kemado Records
- Producers: Jason Lader, Dave Scher, and Mickey Madden

VietNam chronology
The Concrete's Always Grayer on the Other Side of the Street (2004)	VietNam (2007)

Professional ratings
Review scores
Source	Rating
Allmusic	3/5 stars
Rolling Stone	3.5/5 stars

VietNam is the full-length debut of VietNam, released in January 2007. Mickey Madden and Jesse Carmichael of Maroon 5 helped record this album, with Madden serving as one of the executive producers. Jenny Lewis from Rilo Kiley also makes an appearance on the album.

== Track listing ==
1. "Step On Inside" - 3:11
2. "Priest Poet & The Pig" - 5:00
3. "Apocalypse" - 4:52
4. "Mr. Goldfinger" - 4:08
5. "Toby" - 7:28
6. "Gabe" - 2:31
7. "Welcome to My Room" - 5:31
8. "Hotel Riverview" - 4:43
9. "Summer in the City" - 5:02
10. "Too Tired" - 12:04

== Trivia ==
- The song Step On Inside appeared in the 2007 movie I Know Who Killed Me, starring Lindsay Lohan.
- In the album booklet, Carmichael's name is misspelled as "Jessie".

== Personnel ==
Taken from album booklet:

Lead musicians: Michael Gerner, Joshua Grubb, Ivan Berko, Michael Foss
Additional musicians: Paz Lenchantin, Ana Lenchantin, Paloma Udovic, Dave Scher, Mickey Madden, Jesse Carmichael, Casey Brown, Jason Lader, Cross Roads Girl Choir, Jenny Lewis, Liam Philpot, Slim Zwerling
Produced by: Dave Scher, Jason Lader, Mickey Madden
Engineered by: Jason Lader
Assistance-Engineered by: Paul Figueroa, Kevin Dean, Eric Palaba
Studio Assistance: Josh Smith
Recorded at: Sound City Studios, July–August 2005 and The Sound Factory, August 2005
Mixed by: Jason Lader at Sunset Sound, May 2006
Mastered by: Rick Essig
Photo by: Jennifer Tzar
Cover by: Vincent Perini, David Black
Published by Freedom School Publishing (ASCAP), Billy Josh (ASCAP), Farm Road 149 (ASCAP), Lactaid (ASCAP)
Management by: Casey Brown
Legal Representation by: Richard Grabel for Davis, Shapiro, Lewit, Hayes

All songs are written by: Michael Gerner and Joshua Grubb
All songs are arranged by: Michael Gerner, Joshua Grubb, Ivan Berko, Michael Foss
