= Charlatans at the Garden Gate =

Studio album by Tristen Gaspadarek
- Released: February 15, 2011
- Length: 35:39
- Label: American Myth
- Producers: Tristen Gaspadarek; Jeremy Ferguson

Tristen Gaspadarek chronology
Charlatans at the Garden Gate (2011)	C A V E S (2013)

Professional ratings
Aggregate scores
Source	Rating
Metacritic	81/100
Review scores
Source	Rating
The A.V. Club	B+
God Is in the TV	5/5 stars
Paste	8.3/10
Rolling Stone	3.5/5 stars
Slant Magazine	4/5 stars

Charlatans at the Garden Gate is the debut studio album by American singer-songwriter Tristen Gaspadarek. It was released on February 15, 2011, by American Myth Recordings.

== Promotion ==
Tristen performed a few songs from the album for Rolling Stone on June 13, 2011.

== Singles ==
Tristen released the first music video to "Matchstick Murder" on January 4, 2011.

The second single "Baby Drugs" was released on March 10, 2011. The music video was directed by Justin Mitchell.

== Critical reception ==
Charlatans at the Garden Gate was met with "universal acclaim" reviews from critics. At Metacritic, which assigns a weighted average rating out of 100 to reviews from mainstream publications, this release received an average score of 81 based on 4 reviews.

In a review for Paste, critic reviewer China Reevers said: "Charlatans is an exploration of love and relationships, delving deeply into private conversations, while keeping the atmosphere light with tambourines, a little bit of rock, a touch of twang and a splash of pop. Her music remains light with playful rhythms, but she keeps her songs controlled as if they were on a string." Christian Williams of The A.V. Club, described Charlatans at the Garden Gate as a "confident, poignant folk-pop debut that never wants for hooks, and manages to undercut its sing-songiness at every turn with unflinching lyrics and mature songwriting." At Rolling Stone, Will Hermes explained that Tristen's debut is "full of such moments: catchy refrains with multiple meanings, ear-tugging melodies with hidden hooks. She flaunts a philosophy major's palette amidst echoes of vintage rockabilly and girl group pop."

=== Accolades ===
Publications' year-end list appearances for Charlatans at the Garden Gate
Critic/Publication	List	Rank	Ref
American Songwriter	American Songwriter's Top 50 Albums of 2011	44	

== Track listing ==
Charlatans at the Garden Gate track listing
No.	Title	Writer(s)	Length
1.	"Eager for Your Love"	Tristen Gaspadarek	3:45
2.	"Matchstick Murder"	Gaspadarek	3:10
3.	"Doomsday"	Gaspadarek	3:33
4.	"Avalanche"	Gaspadarek	3:38
5.	"Battle of the Gods"	Gaspadarek	3:20
6.	"Baby Drugs"	Gaspadarek; Larissa Maestro; Caitlin Rose	2:34
7.	"Heart and Hope to Die"	Gaspadarek	3:22
8.	"Wicked Heart"	Gaspadarek; Buddy Hughen	2:37
9.	"Tadpole"	Gaspadarek; Rose	3:36
10.	"Special Kind of Fear"	Gaspadarek	2:20
11.	"Save Raina"	Gaspadarek	3:44

== Personnel ==
Musicians

- Tristen Gaspadarek – guitar, piano, vocals
- Jordan Caress − bass, vocals
- Caitlin Rose – vocals
- Chris Scruggs – bass, guitar, drums
- Jeff Irwin – bass
- Matt Moody – bass
- Rollum Haas – drums
- Matt Hearn – drums
- Buddy Hughen – guitar, piano
- Richie Lister – piano
- Dave Paulson – piano
- Larissa Maestro – cello, vocals
- Ben Martin – drums
- Jeremy Ferguson – percussion

Production

- Tristen Gaspadarek – producer
- Jeremy Ferguson – producer
- Jason Lader – mixing
- Steve Fallone – mastering
