= Uncle Tom's Cabin (1987 film) =

1987 television film by Stan Lathan

- Genre: Drama
- Based on: Uncle Tom's Cabin by Harriet Beecher Stowe
- Screenplay by: John Gay
- Directed by: Stan Lathan
- Starring: Avery Brooks; Bruce Dern; Phylicia Rashad; Edward Woodward
- Theme music composer: Kennard A. Ramsey
- Country of origin: United States
- Original language: English

Production
- Executive producers: Michael Barnathan; Edgar J. Scherick
- Producer: Jeffrey A. Nelson
- Production location: Natchez, Mississippi
- Cinematography: Richard M. Burlatsky
- Editor: Lois Freeman-Fox
- Running time: 110 minutes
- Production company: Edgar J. Scherick Associates

Original release
- Network: Showtime
- Release: June 14, 1987

Uncle Tom's Cabin is a 1987 American made-for-television drama film directed by Stan Lathan, and starring Avery Brooks, Bruce Dern, Phylicia Rashad and Edward Woodward. It is based on the 1852 novel of the same name by Harriet Beecher Stowe.

Producer Edgar Scherick there was opposition to filming the novel from some black groups until the NAACP spoke up in favor of it. "We made it for little money in Mississippi in terrible heat."

== Cast ==
- Avery Brooks as Uncle Tom
- Kate Burton as Ophelia
- Bruce Dern as Augustine St. Claire
- Paula Kelly as Cassy
- Phylicia Rashad as Eliza
- Edward Woodward as Simon Legree
- George Coe as Mr. Shelby
- Frank Converse as Trader
- Jenny Lewis as Evangeline "Little Eva" St. Claire
- Troy Beyer as Emmeline
- Samuel L. Jackson as George
- Rhashell Hunter as Jenny
- Irma P. Hall as Mammy
- Jerry Haynes as Dr. Phillips
- Robert Graham as Elias
- Bill Bolender as Trader
