= The Concrete's Always Grayer on the Other Side of the Street =

Live album by VietNam
- Released: September 2004
- Venue: New York's Magic Shop
- Genre: Rock and roll, soul, blues
- Length: 31:02
- Label: Vice Records
- Producer: Matt Boynton

VietNam chronology
The Concrete's Always Grayer on the Other Side of the Street (2004)	Vietnam (2007)

Professional ratings
Review scores
Source	Rating
AllMusic	3.5/5 stars

The Concrete's Always Grayer on the Other Side of the Street is the first EP released by VietNam in 2004 on Vice Records. Features 5 songs recorded in 2003.

== Track listing ==
1. "Too Tired"
2. "Makes No Difference"
3. "Princess"
4. "ApocLAypse"
5. "Lullabye"
