= Rabbit Fur Coat =

Studio album by Jenny Lewis and The Watson Twins
- Released: January 24, 2006
- Genres: Country folk; gospel; folk rock; soul
- Length: 37:38
- Label: Team Love
- Producers: Mike Mogis, Jenny Lewis, Matt Ward

Jenny Lewis chronology
| Rabbit Fur Coat (2006) | Acid Tongue (2008) |

Singles from Rabbit Fur Coat
- 1. "Rise Up with Fists!!" Released: March 9, 2006; 2. "You Are What You Love" Released: May 1, 2006

Rabbit Fur Coat is an album in collaboration by Jenny Lewis of Rilo Kiley, with The Watson Twins. It was released in the United States on January 24, 2006, by Team Love. Lewis has described the album as a "sort of soul record". The album contains a cover of the Traveling Wilburys song "Handle With Care", featuring Ben Gibbard (of Death Cab for Cutie), Conor Oberst (of Bright Eyes) and M. Ward.

Lewis embarked on her first solo tour to support the album, with Johnathan Rice and either Whispertown 2000 or The Blow opening. She also appeared on the Late Show with David Letterman, Jimmy Kimmel Live!, and The Late Late Show with Craig Ferguson in support of the album.

This album is the 8th release of Team Love Records.

Listeners of All Songs Considered, NPR's online music show, voted the album the eighth best of 2006.

A vinyl reissue of Rabbit Fur Coat was released in January 2016, marking its 10th anniversary. Lewis was also joined in early 2016 by M. Ward and The Watson Twins for a brief tour celebrating the anniversary.

== Composition ==
Coat is aligned with several roots music genres, primarily "rootsy" country folk and gospel.

== Reception ==
Professional ratings
Aggregate scores
| Source | Rating |
|---|---|
| Metacritic | 78/100 |
Review scores
| Source | Rating |
| AllMusic | 3.5/5 stars |
| The A.V. Club | B+ |
| Entertainment Weekly | A− |
| The Guardian | 3/5 stars |
| The Independent | 4/5 stars |
| Pitchfork | 6.1/10 |
| Q | 4/5 stars |
| Rolling Stone | 3.5/5 stars |
| Uncut | 5/5 stars |
| The Village Voice | A− |

Rabbit Fur Coat received generally favorable reviews and maintains a normalized rating of 78 out of 100 on Metacritic based on 24 professional reviews.

Actress Anne Hathaway was quoted in People as calling Rabbit Fur Coat "beautiful, funny, and very subversive".

=== Legacy and impact ===
Within Jenny Lewis' discography, Rabbit Fur Coat is considered "a pivotal key change" for her, serving as a springboard for "one of modern indie rock's most reliably cool careers." Deemed her "melancholy opus," Coat is known as "[a] tantalizing effort" that led Lewis to success both critically and commercially beyond her band Rilo Kiley.

Coat has impacted several musicians in the time since its release. In a 2012 MTV feature, Swedish indie folk duo First Aid Kit revealed their use of Coat as a reference point while making their album The Lion's Roar, released that same year. They credited it with prompting them to both "seek solace in sad songs" and to more deeply explore Americana music's catalog. In a 2018 interview, they admitted that "when we started out, we basically tried to write songs like the ones" on Coat. That same year, Liz Stokes of New Zealand indie rock band The Beths wrote that the album "formed the basis of my very first band". Other groups its impact has been noted on include Best Coast and Waxahatchee.

== Tracks ==
People noted that album's first track "Run Devil Run," was "old-time gospel" with Chandra and Leigh Watson providing a cappella backing. with other reviews calling the opener track "a breathy, gospel-tinged number" with a "blast of impassioned close harmony bluegrass-style vocals."

Two singles were released: "Rise Up With Fists!!" and "You Are What You Love".

== Track listing ==
(all tracks written by Lewis except where noted)

1. "Run Devil Run" – 1:06
2. "The Big Guns" – 2:32
3. "Rise Up with Fists!!" – 3:36
4. "Happy" – 4:14
5. "The Charging Sky" – 2:56
6. "Melt Your Heart" – 2:50
7. "You Are What You Love" – 2:51
8. "Rabbit Fur Coat" – 4:32
9. "Handle with Care" (Bob Dylan, George Harrison, Jeff Lynne, Roy Orbison, Tom Petty) – 2:56
10. "Born Secular" – 5:07
11. "It Wasn't Me" – 4:10
12. "Happy (Reprise)" – 0:48

== Charts ==
Album – Billboard (North America)
| Year | Chart | Position |
|---|---|---|
| 2006 | The Billboard 200 | 88 |
| 2006 | Top Independent Albums | 6 |

As of 2007, sales in the United States have exceeded 112,000 copies, according to Nielsen SoundScan.

== Personnel ==
=== Jenny Lewis & The Watson Twins ===
- Jenny Lewis – lead vocals, guitar
- Chandra Watson – backing vocals
- Leigh Watson – backing vocals

=== Musicians ===
- James Valentine – guitar, keyboards, backing vocals
- Johnathan Rice – backing vocals
- Jason Boesel – drums
- Mike Mogis – guitar, producer
- Mickey Madden – bass
- Greg Kurstin – producer, keyboards, backing vocals
- Mike Bloom – engineer
- Matt Ward – guitar, keyboards, backing vocals, producer
- Larry Crane – engineer
- Michael Runion – photography
- Benjamin Gibbard – guitar, backing vocals
- Conor Oberst – guitar, backing vocals
- David Scher – backing vocals
- Rachel Bloomberg – backing vocals
