= Tennessee Thomas =

British drummer (born 1984)

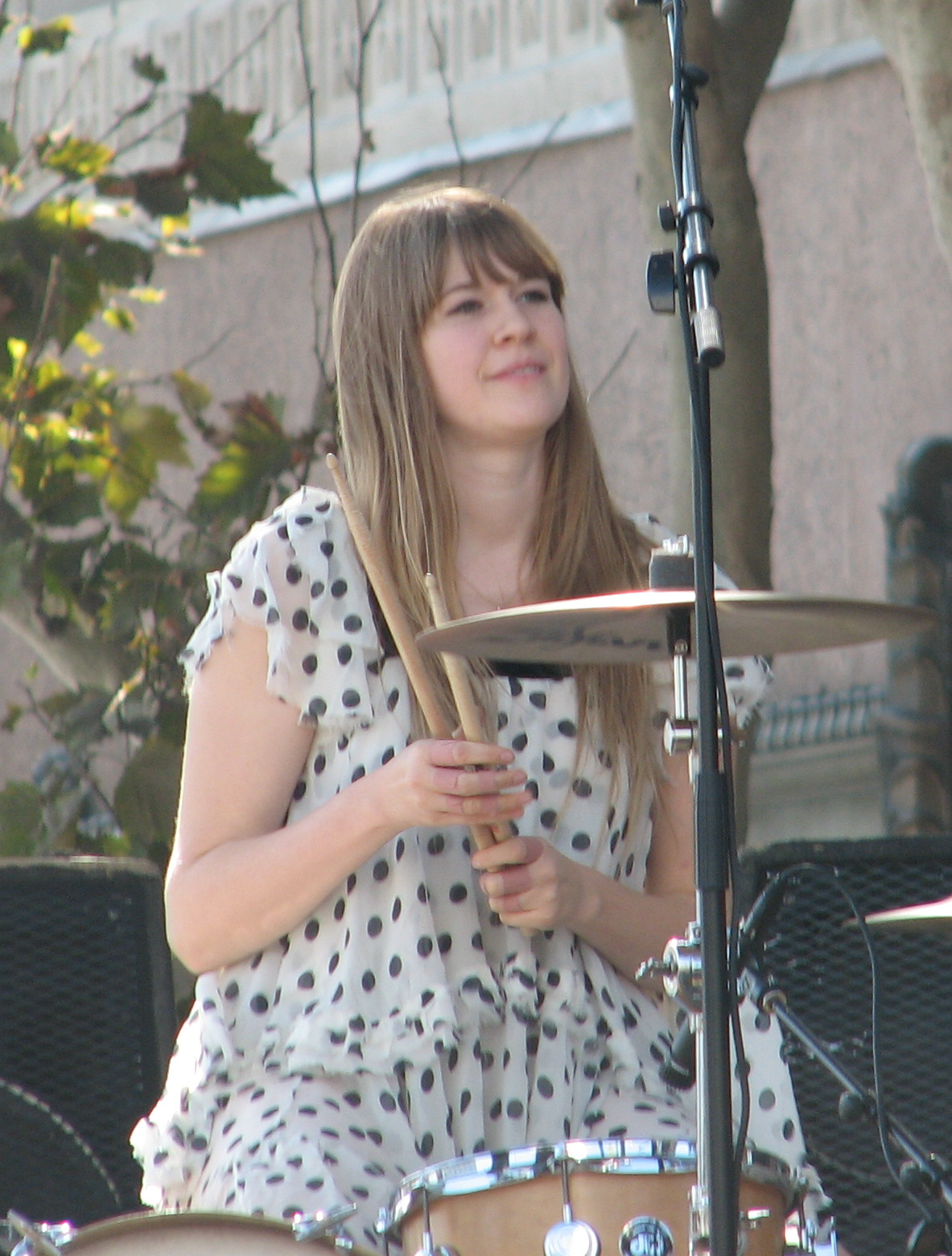
- Thomas performing in 2006
- Born: 17 December 1984 (age 41); London, England
- Education: Marymount High School
- Partner: Benjamin Goodman (2016–present)
- Children: 1
- Parent: Pete Thomas (father)
- Musical career
- Genre: Alternative rock
- Years active: 1997–present
- Label: Geffen
- Member of: Nice as Fuck
- Formerly of: The Like

Tennessee Thomas (born 17 December 1984) is a British drummer. She is best known as the drummer of bands The Like and Nice as Fuck. As an actress, she has played drummers in fictional bands.

== Early and personal life ==
Thomas is the daughter of Pete Thomas, drummer for Elvis Costello and the Attractions, and first started playing the drums at the age of 13. She was raised in both London and Los Angeles, forming band The Like when she was in high school in LA. She was dating Mark Ronson in 2009.

== Career ==
Thomas was a founding member and drummer of the indie rock group The Like. The band formed in 2001, when the group were teenagers; all three of the founding members are daughters of music industry veterans. She deejayed at the Rachel Antonoff show at New York Fashion Week in 2011. By 2014, The Like were taking a "seemingly permanent hiatus".

With a group of female activists and artists, including Lena Dunham, Alexa Chung and Alia Penner, she performed to the song "You Don't Own Me" in 2012 as a PSA on women's rights in political spaces, because of growing misogynistic sentiment being emitted from the Republican Party. She made this as one of many PSA's through the activism group Department of Peace. After finishing touring with The Like and settling in New York City, Thomas worked on campaigns as part of Department of Peace. In 2013, Thomas opened a pop-up in Manhattan's East Village, which turned into her permanent boutique shop and club, the Deep End Club. A performance space, the shop also sells work by local artists with a "graphic '60s vibe".

In 2016, she joined Jenny Lewis and Erika Forster to form the "supergroup" trio Nice As Fuck. Thomas continued her activism, campaigning for Bernie Sanders and turning the Deep End Club into a headquarters for this cause.

She has had two acting roles. In 2010, she portrayed Lynette Guycott in the film Scott Pilgrim vs. the World, based on the Scott Pilgrim comic book series. Lynette is the drummer of the band The Clash at Demonhead, fronted in the film by Brie Larson as Envy Adams and Brandon Routh as bass player Todd. Thomas only appears to play the drums, with her character's role significantly downsized from the comics. In 2014, she appeared in the music video for Jenny Lewis's "Just One of the Guys" as the drummer for Lewis's fictional band, fronted by actresses Kristen Stewart, Anne Hathaway and Brie Larson cross-dressing.
