= Joy'All =

Studio album by Jenny Lewis
- Released: June 9, 2023
- Length: 31:56
- Label: Blue Note Records
- Producer: Dave Cobb

Jenny Lewis chronology
On the Line (2019)	Joy'All (2023)

Joy'All is the fourth solo album and fifth overall by American singer-songwriter Jenny Lewis. It was released on June 9, 2023, by Blue Note Records. The album was produced by Dave Cobb.

== Background and recording ==
Lewis began work on the album while on tour in support of her previous album On the Line (2019) shortly before the COVID-19 pandemic. Work resumed on the album in early 2021 when Lewis participated in a virtual songwriting workshop that was hosted by singer Beck. The album was produced by Dave Cobb, who Lewis met while visiting Lucius at RCA Studio A in Nashville, Tennessee and asked him via text messaging to produce the album for her.

== Singles ==
The album was previewed by the release of the song "Puppy and a Truck" on November 3, 2021. Lewis debuted the track while supporting Harry Styles on his tour. When the album was announced on March 29, 2023, the single "Psychos" was released simultaneously. The next single, "Giddy Up", was released on May 10, 2023. The album's fourth and final single, "Cherry Baby", was released on May 24, 2023.

== Critical reception ==
Professional ratings
Aggregate scores
Source	Rating
AnyDecentMusic?	7.6/10
Metacritic	79/100
Review scores
Source	Rating
AllMusic	4.5/5 stars
Clash	8/10
The Daily Telegraph	4/5 stars
DIY	4/5 stars
The Line of Best Fit	6/10
NME	4/5 stars
Pitchfork	6.7/10
The Skinny	4/5 stars
Slant Magazine	3.5/5 stars
Uncut	8/10

Upon release, Joy'All received positive acclaim from music critics. At Metacritic, which assigns a normalized rating out of 100 based on reviews from mainstream publications, the album has a mean weighted average of 79 out of 100 based on 16 reviews, indicating "generally favorable reviews".

In June 2023, Alternative Press published an unranked list of the top 25 albums of the year to date and included this release, calling it "what it sounds like to choose joy".

== Track listing ==
Joy'All track listing
No.	Title	Length
1.	"Psychos"	3:05
2.	"Joy'All"	3:44
3.	"Puppy and a Truck"	3:11
4.	"Apples and Oranges"	3:46
5.	"Essence of Life"	3:36
6.	"Giddy Up"	3:01
7.	"Cherry Baby"	2:26
8.	"Love Feel"	3:14
9.	"Balcony"	2:43
10.	"Chain of Tears"	3:10
Total length:		31:56

== Charts ==
Chart performance for Joy'All
Chart (2023)	Peak position
US Billboard 200	147
Scottish Albums (OCC)	34
UK Americana Albums (OCC)	4
UK Album Sales Chart (OCC)	19
US Top Alternative Albums (Billboard)	15
US Top Rock Albums (Billboard)	24
US Top Album Sales (Billboard)	12
US Americana/Folk Albums (Billboard)	8
