= On the Line (Jenny Lewis album) =

2019 Jenny Lewis album

Studio album by Jenny Lewis
- Released: March 22, 2019
- Studio: Capitol (Hollywood)
- Genre: Indie rock
- Length: 47:15
- Label: Warner Bros.
- Producer: Beck; Shawn Everett; Jenny Lewis; Ryan Adams

Jenny Lewis chronology
The Voyager (2014)	On the Line (2019)	Joy'All (2023)

Singles from On the Line
- 1. "Red Bull & Hennessy" Released: January 23, 2019; 2. "Heads Gonna Roll" Released: February 14, 2019; 3. "Wasted Youth" Released: March 15, 2019

On the Line is the third solo album and fourth overall by American singer-songwriter Jenny Lewis. The album was released on March 22, 2019, by Warner Bros. Records. Recorded at Capitol Records' Studio B, the album has contributions from Beck, Ringo Starr, Ryan Adams, Don Was, Benmont Tench, Jason Falkner, and Jim Keltner.

== Critical reception ==
Professional ratings
Aggregate scores
Source	Rating
AnyDecentMusic?	8.0/10
Metacritic	85/100
Review scores
Source	Rating
AllMusic	4/5 stars
The A.V. Club	B+
Chicago Tribune	3.5/4 stars
The Daily Telegraph	5/5 stars
The Independent	4/5 stars
NME	5/5 stars
Pitchfork	8.0/10
Q	4/5 stars
Rolling Stone	4/5 stars
Uncut	7/10

On the Line was met with widespread critical acclaim. The Daily Telegraph called it "a smart, swaggering break-up album from a major talent", while The Independent said Lewis "adds a California sheen to melancholy and nostalgia". Robert Christgau was somewhat less impressed in Vice, giving it a three-star honorable mention. He said Lewis, "the rare 21st-century singer-songwriter whose level of craft renders her good enough for 76-year-old master drummer Jim Keltner", "loses the spring in her step that made her so 21st-century by proving it", naming as highlights the title track, "Rabbit Hole", and "Dogwood".

In a year-end essay for Slate, Ann Powers cited On the Line as one of her favorite albums from 2019 and proof that the format is not dead but rather undergoing a "metamorphosis". She added that concept albums had reemerged through the culturally-relevant autobiographical narratives of artists such as Lewis, who "confronted the ghost of her mother by invoking the musical touchstones they had shared in the fearless On the Line".

=== Ryan Adams' involvement ===
A month prior to the album's release, Ryan Adams, who helped produce the record, was accused by several women of sexual misconduct. After the album was released, Lewis told Pitchfork: "The allegations are so serious and shocking and really fucked up, and I was so sad on so many levels when I heard, I hate that he's on this album, but you can't rewrite how things went. We started the record together two years ago, and he worked on it — we were in the studio for five days. Then he pretty much bounced, and I had to finish the album by myself."

== Track listing ==
No.	Title	Length
1.	"Heads Gonna Roll"	5:14
2.	"Wasted Youth"	4:13
3.	"Red Bull & Hennessy"	4:49
4.	"Hollywood Lawn"	4:35
5.	"Do Si Do"	3:54
6.	"Dogwood"	4:29
7.	"Party Clown"	4:09
8.	"Little White Dove"	4:49
9.	"Taffy"	4:28
10.	"On the Line"	3:49
11.	"Rabbit Hole"	2:46
Total length:		47:15

== Charts ==
Chart (2019)	Peak position
Irish Albums (IRMA)	59
Scottish Albums (OCC)	11
UK Albums (OCC)	27
US Billboard 200	34
US Top Alternative Albums (Billboard)	2
US Top Rock Albums (Billboard)	4
UK Americana Albums (OCC)	1
