= I'm Having Fun Now =

2010 album

Studio album by Jenny and Johnny
- Released: August 31, 2010
- Genre: Alternative, rock
- Length: 40:19
- Label: Warner Bros.
- Producer: Jenny and Johnny

Singles from I'm Having Fun Now
- 1. "Big Wave" Released: August 9, 2010; 2. "Scissor Runner" Released: August, 2010; 3. "Animal" Released: August, 2010; 4. "Just Like Zeus" Released: August 2010

Professional ratings
Review scores
Source	Rating
Los Angeles Times	3.5/4 stars
Spin	7/10 stars
Rolling Stone	3/5 stars
The New York Times	(positive)
Alternative Press	3.5/5 stars
Pitchfork	(6.7/10)
InYourSpeakers	(87/100)
AllMusic	3/5 stars

I'm Having Fun Now is the debut studio album by Jenny and Johnny - a collaboration between Jenny Lewis and Johnathan Rice. It was released in 2010.

== Track listing ==
No.	Title	Length
1.	"Scissor Runner"	3:00
2.	"My Pet Snakes"	3:39
3.	"Switchblade"	3:37
4.	"Big Wave"	3:55
5.	"While Men Are Dreaming"	2:25
6.	"Animal"	3:42
7.	"Just Like Zeus"	2:41
8.	"New Yorker Cartoon"	4:16
9.	"Straight Edge of the Blade"	3:53
10.	"Slavedriver"	2:15
11.	"Committed"	2:44
12.	"The Highs and Lows of Being #1" (iTunes pre-order bonus track)	4:12
Total length:		40:19
