= Johnathan Rice =

American singer-songwriter (born 1983)

Background information
- Born: May 27, 1983 (age 43)
- Origin: Alexandria, Virginia, United States; Glasgow, Scotland

Johnathan Rice (born May 27, 1983) is a Scottish-American singer-songwriter. His first album, Trouble is Real, was released on Reprise Records on April 26, 2005. His follow-up, Further North, was released by Reprise on September 11, 2007. He has also worked as a producer on Jenny Lewis' Acid Tongue (2008) and Voyager (2014), and as a songwriter on the self-titled record by Nashville band The Apache Relay. He has served as a session and live musician with Elvis Costello on 2008's Momofuku). In 2010, he released a collaborative album I'm Having Fun Now with Jenny Lewis, as Jenny and Johnny. In 2013–14, Rice and Lewis scored and wrote seven original songs for the 2014 film Song One, starring Anne Hathaway.

== Early life ==
Rice was born in Alexandria, Virginia on May 27, 1983. He spent his childhood between there and his parents' native Glasgow, Scotland. He attended two high schools, Washington, D.C.'s all-male Jesuit Gonzaga College High School and Glasgow's Turnbull High School in the suburb of Bishopbriggs.

== Career ==
Before graduating from high school in 2001, Rice befriended Chris Keup, a Virginian singer songwriter and self-styled A&R man. Keup produced Rice's first known recordings, the six song Heart and Mind EP, which was recorded in Charlottesville, V.A. with engineer Stewart Myers and then informally released on Keup's own Grantham Dispatch Records.

Rice moved from Virginia to New York City at the age of eighteen with 1,000 copies of the Heart and Mind EP and the intention of launching his career as a singer-songwriter. He arrived in New York two days before the attacks on the World Trade Center on September 11, 2001. Imagery of the attacks and their aftermath appear in the lyrics of several of the songs on Trouble Is Real, including "City on Fire", "Put Me in Your Holy War" and "Salvation Day".

Rice played small folk clubs in Manhattan and Brooklyn, most notably playing regular sets at the Living Room at its original location on Stanton Street, and built a live following that lead to headlining performances at its revamped Ludlow Street location. Rice lived in an apartment in mid-town Manhattan and worked different jobs to pay the rent, all the while writing the songs that would make up his debut album.

Rice's EP caught the attention of A&R man Perry Watts-Russell, who had just left Capitol Records to begin working at Warner Bros. Records. He flew Rice out to Los Angeles, where he auditioned for Watts-Russell and then label head Tom Whalley. Rice was subsequently offered a record deal with the company.

After several attempts at making Trouble is Real, Rice enlisted Mike Mogis, the producer of Bright Eyes, Rilo Kiley and the Faint. The album was recorded over five weeks in Lincoln, Nebraska. The two worked alongside string arranger Nate Walcott to create a rich, diverse sound for the album, with most songs leading into one another as a single work of music. The album was released on April 26, 2005.

The album failed to break into the charts but was a favorite of TV music-supervisors, leading to high-profile appearances of songs on The OC (Rice's song "So Sweet" is featured on the OC Mix 2) and Grey's Anatomy.

Rice has cited Neil Young, Gram Parsons, Colin Blunstone, Spoon, Pixies, and Pavement among his influences.

Rice toured Trouble Is Real extensively, mostly as a support act for acts such as Jesse Harris, Mason Jennings, Starsailor, Martha Wainwright, Jenny Lewis and R.E.M. The group, introduced to Rice's music through guitarist Peter Buck selected him to support them in London's Hyde Park in July 2005 in front of a crowd of 80,000 people. Rice played the concert with his touring band, Death Valley, a lap steel and harmony group that featured Neal Casal (who would later join the Cardinals with Ryan Adams) and "Farmer" Dave Scher of the Beachwood Sparks and All Night Radio.

Rice's appearance at the Hyde Park concert and another performance at the 100 Club are captured on film in the 2005 documentary Johnathan Rice and Death Valley: Live in London.

== Motion picture roles ==
In 2005 Rice played Roy Orbison in the Oscar-winning 20th Century Fox film Walk the Line alongside Joaquin Phoenix and Reese Witherspoon and contributed to its platinum selling, GRAMMY -winning, T-Bone Burnett-produced soundtrack.

== Collaborations with Jenny Lewis, Elvis Costello and others ==
In 2006, Rice joined Jenny Lewis's touring band and played on her debut album Rabbit Fur Coat. This was the beginning of a years-long stint of collaborations with Lewis. During the second leg of the tour, the band began performing a Rice composition, "Carpetbaggers". This song would later be recorded for Lewis's second solo album, 2008's Acid Tongue, with Rice's original vocal part reinterpreted by Elvis Costello. Costello enjoyed the session with Lewis and Rice so much that he decided to bring in his band, the Imposters, to record a full album of new material with Lewis, Rice, Farmer Dave Scher and Jason Lader, resulting in 2008's Momofuku.

In the winter of 2006 Rice enlisted producers Farmer Dave Scher and Jason Lader to make his second album, Further North, at Los Angeles' Sound City Studios. The record was mixed at Hollywood's Sound Factory and mastered in New York City by Greg Calbi. The record was released on September 11, 2007. Seven of the record's eleven songs were co-written with Jenny Lewis.

In the spring of 2007 Rice toured with Ben Gibbard, Jenny Lewis and David Bazan finishing their tour May 21, 2007, at the Showbox in Seattle.

Rice again toured the record extensively both with a full band and solo acoustic, again mostly as a support act for the Good Life, Rilo Kiley, Matt Costa and the Redwalls. In 2008 Rice co-headlined a tour with Maria Taylor of Azure Ray, and played Los Angeles' Sunset Junction festival.

In 2008, Rice acted as a producer, musician, and co-songwriter on Jenny Lewis' second solo album, Acid Tongue. The record was recorded back to back with Elvis Costello's Momofuku at Sound City Studios. Rice again joined Lewis' touring band for her 2008–09 world tour, which included memorable performances at the Coachella and Bonnaroo festivals.

This would further lead to the collaboration with girlfriend Jenny Lewis, as Jenny and Johnny, in 2010. Their first album, I'm Having Fun Now, was released by Warner Brothers on August 31, 2010.

Jenny and Johnny toured the world in 2010–12. They supported Pavement on several stops on their 2010 reunion tour.

== The Emerald Triangle Tour ==
In October–November 2009, Rice joined Vetiver's Andy Cabic, Farmer Dave Scher and Jonathan Wilson for a five-date California-only run of shows dubbed "The Emerald Triangle Tour". The tour took the band through the Emerald Triangle, a three-county area where the vast majority of California's marijuana is grown and harvested. In a press release, the newly formed group said the purpose of the tour was to "have some fun and celebrate the current Green Rush". The tour was profiled in the May 2010 issue of High Times magazine.

== Good Graces ==
In 2013, Rice released his third solo album, Good Graces, on SQE Music. In support of the album he toured the US with Dawes and the Apache Relay.

== Song One ==
In 2013, Rice and Jenny Lewis were approached by producers Anne Hathaway and Adam Shulman to write songs for and score the film Song One, written and directed by Kate Barker-Froyland. They wrote seven original songs for the film and the songs were performed by actor Johnny Flynn. They also produced the film's soundtrack.

== The Voyager ==
In 2014, Jenny Lewis released her third solo album The Voyager. Rice co-produced two songs on the album with Lewis: "Head Underwater" and "You Can’t Outrun ‘Em". He also co-wrote two songs: "She’s Not Me" and "The New You".

== Discography ==
- Extended Player 24:26 (EP) 2004
- Trouble Is Real 2005
- A Girl Called Miami EP 2007
- Further North 2007
- Good Graces 2013
- The Long Game 2019

=== Compilations ===
- Music from the OC: Mix 2 (2004, Warner Bros. Records)

=== Jenny and Johnny ===
- I'm Having Fun Now (2010, Warner Bros. Records)

== Filmography ==
- Walk the Line (2005) ... Roy Orbison
- Song One (2014) ... Composer, soundtrack producer
- Ricki and the Flash (2015) ... Writer: "Cold One"
