= Artists for Peace and Justice =

Canadian non-profit organization

- Founded: 2009
- Founder: Paul Haggis
- Type: Non-profit organization
- Location: Toronto, ON
- Region served: Haiti
- Website: www.apjnow.org

Artists for Peace and Justice is a non-profit organization founded in 2009 by Paul Haggis that encourages peace and social justice and addresses issues of poverty and enfranchisement in communities around the world. The organization’s immediate goal is to serve the poorest communities in Haiti with programs in education, healthcare, and dignity.

== Mission ==
The goal is to foster economic growth and empower local communities. The main mission is to serve the poorest society in Haiti with courses in education, healthcare, and dignity, through the arts.

== History ==
APJ began after filmmaker Paul Haggis met Father Rick Frechette, an American doctor and community organizer working in Haiti. Father Frechette founded the St. Luke Foundation, a Haitian-run organization providing education, medical care, and humanitarian outreach to over 150,000 people per year. Inspired by the work of Father Frechette, Paul Haggis organized friends and colleagues to support the work of the St Luke Foundation, paying particular attention to its education programs and from this effort conceived APJ. The organization raises money to support Father Frachette's work in Haiti and the operations of the foundation's schools.

== Programs ==
The organization is currently focused on continuing the construction of the Academy for Peace and Justice in Port-au-Prince, which is administered by the St. Luke Foundation. The Academy opened in October 2010 to 400 students, and has expanded in each subsequent year, now educating 2,500 students.

In addition to expanding the secondary school, Artists for Peace and Justice began construction on a post-secondary school in 2013 called the Artists Institute of Haiti, a free college for art and technology in the coastal city of Jacmel.
