= Whispertown =

American indie music project

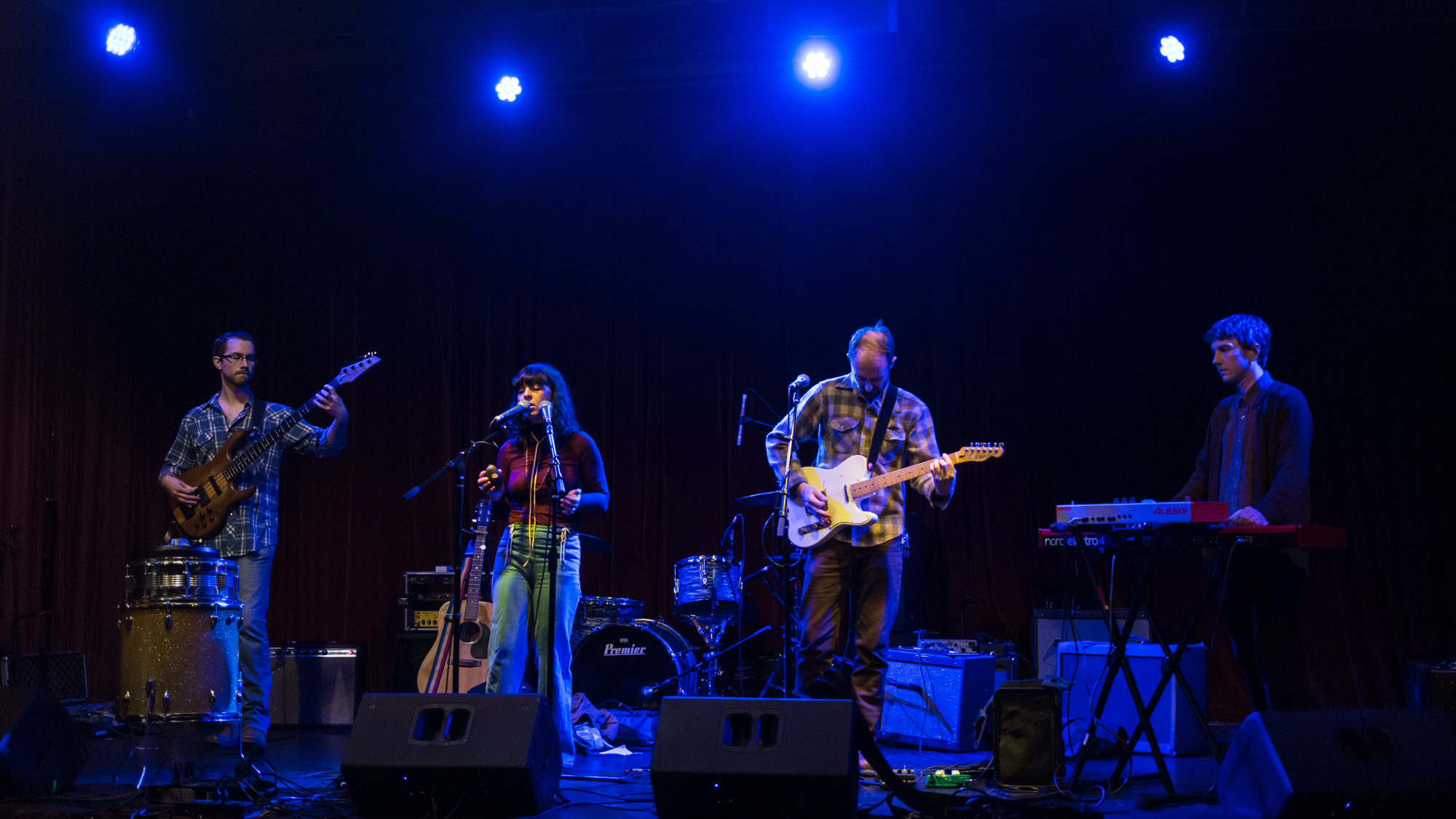
- Whispertown performing in 2017

Background information
- Origin: Los Angeles, California
- Genres: Indie, soul, alternative country, indie folk
- Years active: 2005–present
- Labels: Acony Records, Graveface Records
- Members: Morgan Nagler; Jake Bellows
- Past members: Vanesa Corbala; Colt Maloney; Casey Wisenbaker; Tod Adrian Wisenbaker
- Website: www.whispertown.com

Whispertown (formerly known as Whispertown 2000 or the Whispertown 2000) is an American indie music project from Los Angeles, California, fronted by singer-songwriter Morgan Nagler. They have toured or performed with Bright Eyes, Rilo Kiley, Jenny Lewis, the Breeders, She & Him, Maria Taylor, M. Ward, Margot & the Nuclear So and So's and the Elected.

== History ==
A native of Oregon who grew up in Los Angeles, Nagler worked as a child actor, appearing on the TV series Punky Brewster and The Fresh Prince of Bel-Air, as well as in the film American Pie 2 (2001) as the band camp friend of Michelle Flaherty (played by Alyson Hannigan).

Nagler met and befriended fellow former child actor Blake Sennett in the mid-1990s. Soon after, Sennett and Jenny Lewis formed the band Rilo Kiley in 1998, and Nagler also began writing songs and singing. In 2004, Nagler performed her songs before a live audience (with help from friend Tod Adrian Wisenbaker) as the opening act for the Elected, Sennett's side project from Rilo Kiley. Nagler credits Sennett and Lewis for giving her the support to record and perform her own songs.

In 2005, Nagler and Wisenbaker named their group Whispertown 2000 and asked Vanesa Corbala and Colt Maloney to join. During the fall 2006 tour, Casey Wisenbaker (Tod's brother) also joined the band. Their debut album, Livin' in a Dream, was released in 2006. It was produced by Sennett and Jimmy Tamborello (of Dntel and the Postal Service). Additional performers included Sennett, Jenny Lewis and Johnathan Rice. Maloney parted ways with the band in 2007.

Nagler co-wrote Rilo Kiley's "Dreamworld", from their fourth and final full-length album, Under the Blacklight (2007). "Dreamworld" was included in Rolling Stone magazine's list of "16 Best Fleetwood Mac Songs (Not by Fleetwood Mac)" and was also listed in the KROQ Top 106.7 Countdown of 2007.

On October 21, 2008, the band released their second full-length album, Swim, on Acony Records. Along with this new release, the official name of the band changed to the Whispertown 2000 (with definite article "the" included). Additional performers included Lewis, Gillian Welch and David Rawlings. Nagler co-wrote "Sweet Tooth" from Rawlings' 2009 album A Friend of a Friend.

On March 20, 2012, Nagler released the EP Parallel under the name Whispertown. Parallel was her second release on Acony. The EP was recorded and mixed by Andy LeMaster (of Bright Eyes), co-produced by Jake Bellows (of Neva Dinova) and executive produced by Rawlings. NPR premiered the video for the title track on July 3, 2013, calling it "luscious and expansive". Paste gave Parallel a 7.1 out of 10, calling it "resoundingly solid ... keeping a balance between two divergent aesthetics (singer-songwriter fare and classic country heft)." In August, Nagler was featured in Rolling Stone's profile on Laurel Canyon's revival at the home of Jonathan Wilson, and how "the former L.A. home base of Joni Mitchell and Jackson Browne is now a hub to a new wave of hippie rockers."

In 2013, Nagler starred in the movie Pleased to Meet Me, featuring Aimee Mann, John Doe, Loudon Wainwright III and Joe Henry. That same year, Haim released the song "Falling", co-written by Nagler. It was the third single from their debut studio album, Days Are Gone, and peaked at No. 30 on the UK Singles Chart.

In 2014, Kim Deal and Nagler released a 7-inch single, "The Root"/"Range on Castle". Pitchfork premiered the video for "The Root" on March 21, 2014. The lyric video for "Range on Castle" was premiered by Bob Boilen on NPR Music on July 10, 2014.

Whispertown released I'm a Man on September 1, 2017, on Graveface Records. The title track premiered on Impose on July 17, 2017, and was KCRW's "Top Tune" on August 17, 2017. In October, Whispertown opened for M. Ward on a string of west coast dates. Nagler appeared in the video for the title track from Kevin Morby's 2017 album, City Music.

== Members ==
- Morgan Nagler – lead vocals, guitar, songwriter
- Jake Bellows – guitar, vocals

=== Former members ===
- Vanesa Corbala – vocals, drums, percussion
- Colt Maloney – bass
- Casey Wisenbaker – bass, guitar, drums
- Tod Adrian Wisenbaker – guitar, drums

== Discography ==
=== Albums ===
- Whispertown 2000 – Livin' in a Dream (2006, Whispertown self-release)
- The Whispertown 2000 – Swim (2008, Acony Records)
- Whispertown – Parallel (2012, Acony Records)
- Whispertown – I'm a Man (2017, Graveface Records)

=== Extended plays ===
- The Whispertown 2000 – Done With Love (2009, Acony Records)
- Whispertown – Get Happy (2010, Whispertown self-release)

=== Co-writes and other appearances ===
- Jenny Lewis & Whispertown 2000 – "Paradise"/"Hometown" 7-inch (2006, Team Love Records)
- Rilo Kiley – Under the Blacklight; "Dreamworld" (2007, Warner Bros.)
- David Rawlings Machine – A Friend of a Friend; "Sweet Tooth" (2009, Acony Records)
- Haim – "Falling" (2013, Polydor Records)
- Kim Deal & Morgan Nagler – "The Root"/"Range on Castle" 7-inch (2014, n/a)
- Good People Rock: A Yellow Bird Project Covers Compilation – "Give a Little Love" (Rilo Kiley cover) (2015, Yellow Bird Project/Madic Records)
- Maria Taylor – In the Next Life; "If Only" (2016, Flower Moon Records)
