= Momofuku (album) =

Studio album by Elvis Costello and the Imposters
- Released: 22 April 2008
- Recorded: 16 January 2008; 7–14 February 2008
- Studios: Sound City, Van Nuys, California
- Genres: Alternative rock; roots rock
- Length: 47:10
- Label: Lost Highway
- Producers: Elvis Costello; Jason Lader

Elvis Costello chronology
The River in Reverse (2006)	Momofuku (2008)	Secret, Profane & Sugarcane (2009)

Elvis Costello and The Imposters chronology
The Delivery Man (2004)	Momofuku (2008)	Look Now (2018)

Professional ratings
Review scores
Source	Rating
AllMusic	4/5 stars
The Guardian	5/5 stars
Pitchfork	7.5/10
Spin	3/5 stars

Momofuku is an album by Elvis Costello and the Imposters, released in 2008. The album features Rilo Kiley's frontwoman Jenny Lewis on harmony vocals on several tracks. The album title refers to Momofuku Ando, the Taiwanese inventor of instant ramen noodles, and the speed at which the album was conceived and created. It was first released on vinyl and as a digital download, then later released on CD.

== Critical reception ==
Momofuku was well received by critics upon release. Jason Crock of Pitchfork called the album a "fiercely melodic record". For The Guardian, Graeme Thomson said "This is easily Costello's most instinctive, least self-conscious record of original songs in over a decade." Stephen Thomas Erlewine of AllMusic wrote "the lyrics are as expertly crafted and wryly sophisticated as any latter-day Costello record." Jennifer Kelly of Pop Matters said "It may not add a single classic to the 20 to 30 great songs under the Elvis Costello byline, but it reminds us of them, and that’s a good thing."

Writing for The Austin Chronicle, Jim Caligiuri said "Like some of his best work, Momofuku feels thrown together, loose and natural." SPIN's Chris Norris said the album was "as sharp and lively" as Costello's earlier works. Matt Melis, writing for Consequence of Sound, said Momofuku was "characterized by the sincerity and subtle beauty of its imperfections." Will Hermes of Rolling Stone positively compared the album to This Year's Model, writing "no one can turn vitriol into art better than Elvis Costello."

== Track listing ==
All tracks are written by Elvis Costello, except where noted.

No.	Title	Writer(s)	Length
1.	"No Hiding Place"		3:59
2.	"American Gangster Time"		3:45
3.	"Turpentine"		5:40
4.	"Harry Worth"		4:28
5.	"Drum & Bone"		2:34
6.	"Flutter & Wow"		4:18
7.	"Stella Hurt"		4:46
8.	"Mr. Feathers"		2:45
9.	"My Three Sons"		3:05
10.	"Song with Rose"	Costello; Rosanne Cash	3:02
11.	"Pardon Me, Madam, My Name Is Eve"	Costello; Loretta Lynn	3:53
12.	"Go Away"		4:55

== Personnel ==
=== Elvis Costello and the Imposters ===
- Elvis Costello – vocals, guitars, piano, electric organ
- Pete Thomas – drums
- Davey Faragher – bass guitar, vocals
- Steve Nieve – Wurlitzer, vox organ, pianet, grand piano, piano, melodica, clavinet

=== Additional musicians ===
- "Farmer" Dave Scher – pedal steel guitar, lap steel guitar, electric organ, vocals
- Jonathan Rice – guitars, vocals
- Jenny Lewis – vocals, harmony vocals
- Jonathan Wilson – guitars, vocals
- Tennessee Thomas – drums
- David Hidalgo – guitars, viola, vocals

=== Production ===
- Elvis Costello – producer
- Jason Lader – producer, engineering, mixing, studio photography
- Josh Smith – assistant engineer
- Stephen Marcussen – mastering
- Kevin Gray – vinyl mastering
- Zach Cordner – Elvis Costello portrait

== Charts ==
Chart (2008)	Peak position
Belgian Albums (Ultratop Flanders)	49
Japanese Albums (Oricon)	98
Norwegian Albums (VG-lista)	34
UK Albums (OCC)	112
US Billboard 200	59
