= VietNam (band) =

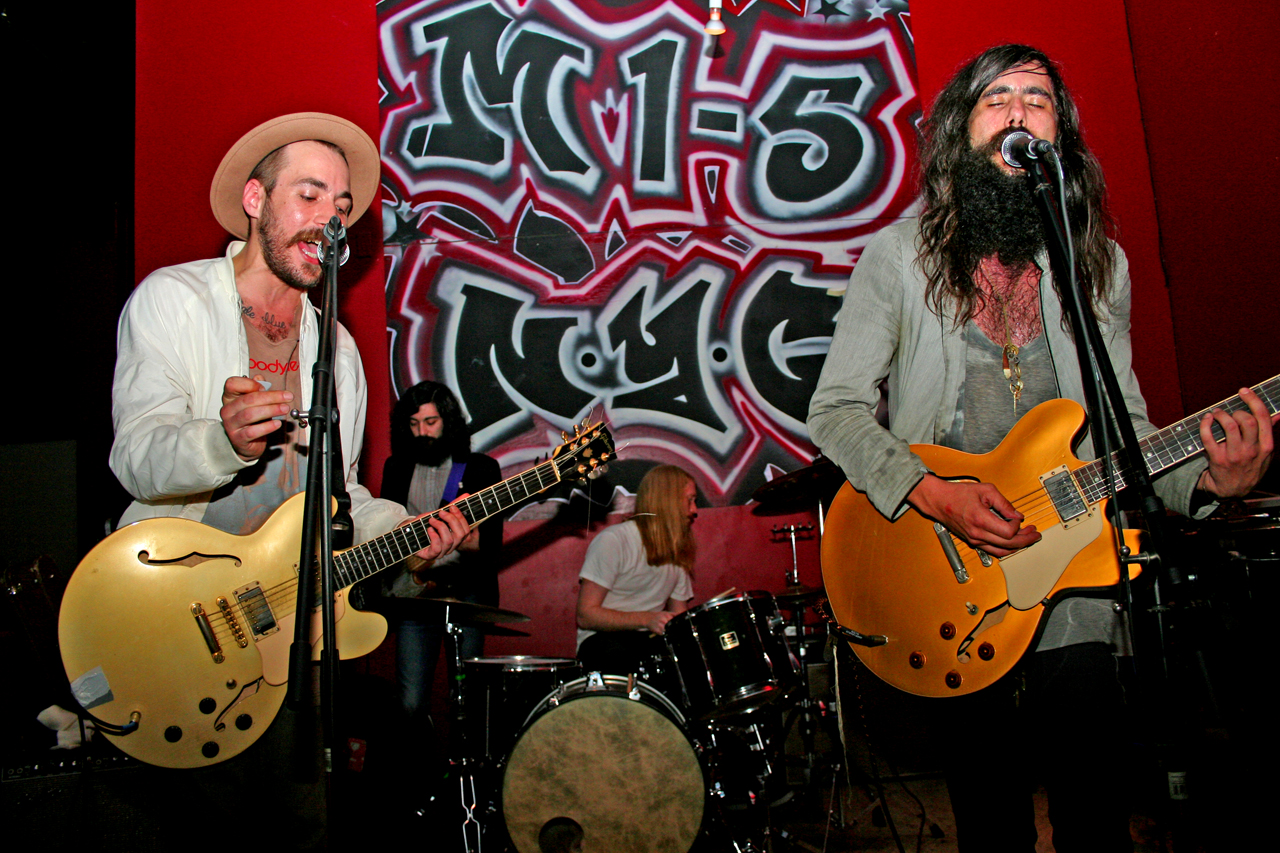
- VietNam performing in New York City on March 2, 2007.

Background information
- Origin: Brooklyn, New York, United States
- Genres: Rock and Roll, Blues, Soul
- Years active: 1999–present
- Labels: Mexican Summer; Kemado Records; Vice Records; The Social Registry
- Members: Michael Gerner; Michael Foss; Nathanael "Lefty" Maynard; Clint Newsom; Christopher Anderson; Christian Havins
- Past members: Joshua Grubb; Ivan Berko; Gabe Bishop; Ben Cissner; Alan Rosetti; Matt Brown
- Website: vietnamtheband.com

VietNam is a rock band from Brooklyn, New York on Mexican Summer. Since the group's inception it has undergone many personnel changes, with leader Michael Gerner remaining the sole original member and chief songwriter. VietNam released their first EP on Vice Records in 2004, The Concrete's Always Grayer on the Other Side of the Street followed by VietNam in 2007 and an A.merican D.ream in 2013.

== Discography ==
- The Concrete's Always Grayer on the Other Side of the Street (2004)
- VietNam (2007)
- an A.merican D.ream (2013)
