= The Watson Twins =

American band

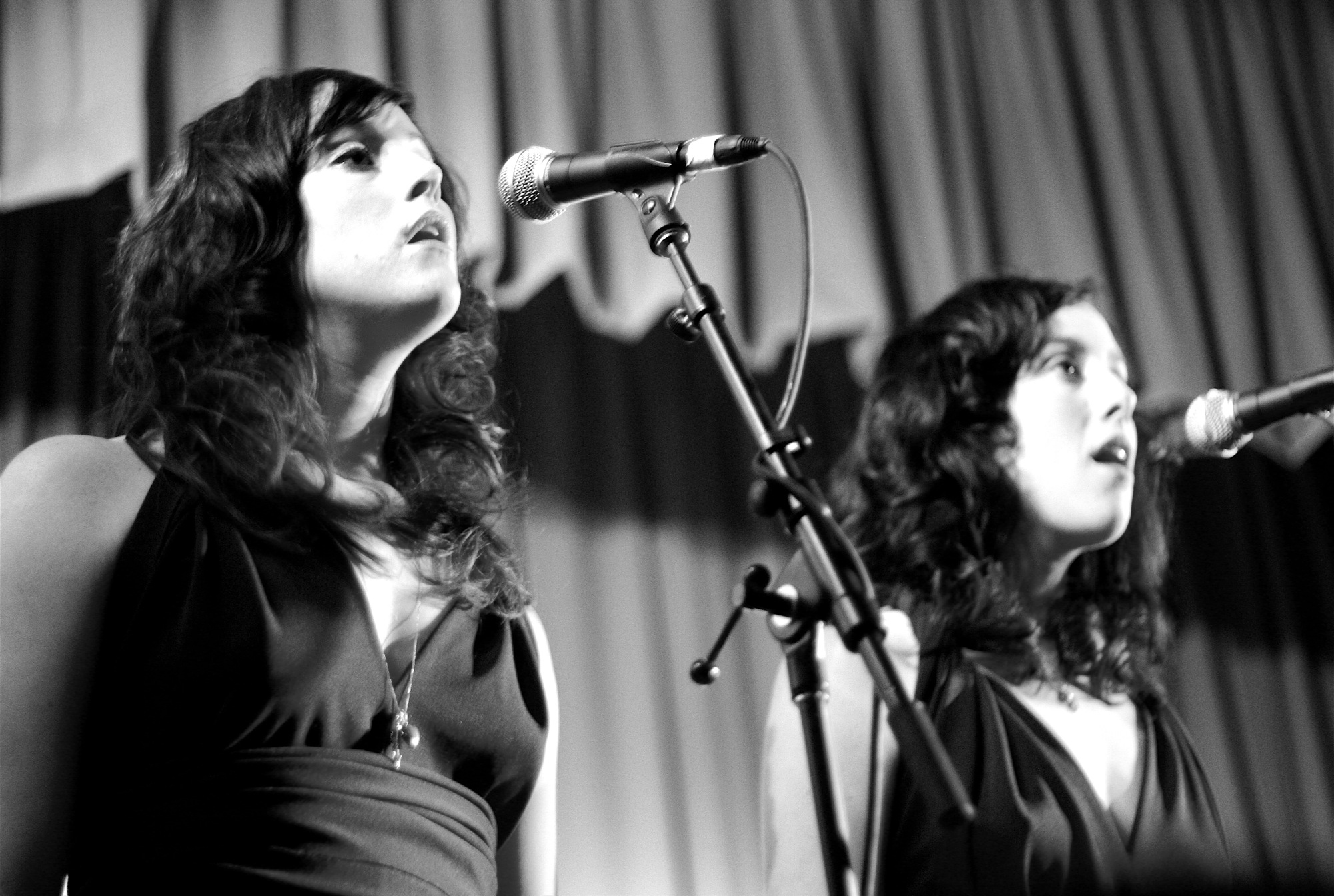
- Leigh and Chandra Watson, 2006

Background information
- Born: March 17, 1975 (age 51)
- Origin: Louisville, Kentucky, U.S. Los Angeles, California, U.S.
- Genres: Americana, Indie Folk
- Years active: 2006–present
- Labels: Team Love Records; Vanguard Records; Bloodshot Records
- Members: Chandra Watson; Leigh Watson
- Website: Official site

The Watson Twins are an Americana band based in Nashville, TN formed by identical twin sisters Chandra and Leigh Watson.

== Biography ==
Chandra and Leigh were born on March 17, 1975, in Tulsa, Oklahoma and raised in Louisville, Kentucky. Their father, Bobby Watson, was a college basketball coach who was killed in a plane crash in 1977. They attended the University of Evansville then moved to the Silver Lake neighborhood of Los Angeles, California in 1998, where they were founding members of Slydell. They also began writing their own music and performing with other local musicians.

In 2006, the Watson Twins released their debut EP, Southern Manners, simultaneously with Rabbit Fur Coat, their collaboration with singer-songwriter Jenny Lewis, a neighbor of the sisters in Silver Lake. Their album, Fire Songs, was released on June 24, 2008. On February 9, 2010, they released Talking To You, Talking To Me on Vanguard Records.

The group recorded a version of the Neil Young song "Powderfinger" for the American Laundromat Records compilation charity album titled Cinnamon Girl - Women Artists Cover Neil Young for Charity, released in February 2008. They also recorded a version of The Cure song "Just Like Heaven" for the first soundtrack album from the HBO TV series True Blood, released in 2009.

== Discography ==
- Rabbit Fur Coat (2006) ("Jenny Lewis with the Watson Twins")
- Southern Manners (2006)
- Cinnamon Girl - Women Artists Cover Neil Young for Charity (2008)
- Fire Songs (2008)
- Live at Fingerprints EP (2009)
- Talking To You, Talking To Me (2010)
- Night Covers - EP (2011)
- Pioneer Lane (2013)
- Duo (2018)
- Holler (2023)
