= The Voyager (album) =

Studio album by Jenny Lewis
- Released: July 29, 2014
- Recorded: 2013–2014
- Genre: Americana; alternative pop; folk rock; yacht rock; new wave
- Length: 39:38
- Label: Warner Bros.
- Producer: Ryan Adams

Jenny Lewis chronology
| Acid Tongue (2008) | The Voyager (2014) | On the Line (2019) |

Singles from The Voyager
- 1. "Just One of the Guys" Released: June 3, 2014; 2. "The Voyager" Released: July 7, 2014; 3. "She's Not Me" Released: July 21, 2014

The Voyager is the second solo album and third overall by American singer-songwriter Jenny Lewis. The album was released on July 29, 2014, by Warner Bros. Records. The album was primarily produced by Ryan Adams at his studio, PAX AM.

== Background ==
In May 2014, Lewis spoke to Rolling Stone about the album, saying: "Making The Voyager got me through one of the most difficult periods of my life. After Rilo Kiley broke up and a few really intense personal things happened, I completely melted down. It nearly destroyed me. I had such severe insomnia that, at one point, I didn't sleep for five straight nights. Many of the songs on The Voyager came out of the need to occupy my mind in the moments when I just couldn't shut down."

In a July 2014, interview with Rolling Stone, she spoke about Ryan Adams producing the album, saying: "In some ways, I felt like he was needling me. He was winding me up. I was somewhat agitated at times, and I think it put me in a really cool place to perform those songs. Ryan is the most unique producer I've ever worked with, in his approach and behavior [...] He made me listen to five or six Creed songs, really loudly on these beautiful tube speakers. My ears were bleeding. And it was Creed! He was like, 'This is great music. I want you to hear it.' And by the third song, I was like 'Huh. Umm. Yeah, I can maybe see that.'"

== Composition ==
On The Voyager, Lewis takes on both "candid [and] disarming" alt-pop and the sunnier sides of vintage yacht rock. It also works in Americana and late-'70s folk rock. Pitchfork also noted its "sunny 80s new wave" sound.

== Critical reception ==
Professional ratings
Aggregate scores
| Source | Rating |
|---|---|
| AnyDecentMusic? | 7.5/10 |
| Metacritic | 77/100 |
Review scores
| Source | Rating |
| AllMusic | 4.5/5 stars |
| The A.V. Club | B |
| Cuepoint (Expert Witness) | A− |
| The Daily Telegraph | 4/5 stars |
| The Guardian | 3/5 stars |
| NME | 5/10 |
| Pitchfork | 7.2/10 |
| Q | 4/5 stars |
| Rolling Stone | 3.5/5 stars |
| Spin | 9/10 |

The Voyager was met with generally positive reviews from music critics. At Metacritic, which assigns a normalized rating out of 100 to reviews from critics, the album received an average score of 77, which indicates "generally positive reviews", based on 33 reviews. Katherine Flynn of Consequence of Sound said, "It’s obvious that Lewis desperately needed to make The Voyager, and maybe it doesn’t really matter if it’s the album that the fans who still pray to her after all this time needed to hear. Her rich, heartbreaking voice remains, the drug references are still there, and her skilled musicianship still underpins every song. The Voyager is a grower. I can feel it." Caroline Sullivan of The Guardian stated, "Yet for all its merits – her voice is utterly pure, and the altpop textures luscious – The Voyager lacks unity. There's a touch of gleaming Haim-pop in "She's Not Me," a dash of album producer Ryan Adams in track "The New You," and a plethora of other influences overall." Jesse Cataldo of Slant Magazine stated, "Produced by Ryan Adams with help from Beck, Rice, and Lewis herself, The Voyager changes in style from song to song, with most landing in the territory of late-'70s folk rock, sounds from a time in which the warm AM-radio aesthetic was giving way to the slick stylings of the '80s. It's a nice period setting for an album concerned with loss as a significant factor of aging, but too many songs here feel slackly constructed, and the overall musical mood only rarely connects with its lyrical content, leaving The Voyager as a moderately successful testimonial effort." Stephen Carlick of Exclaim! said, "On The Voyager, Lewis is confident and sharp, her incisive, dark lyrics juxtaposed by bright, sunny instrumentals that help the album go down easy while rewarding repeat listens."

Robert Christgau, writing in Cuepoint, praised Lewis' songwriting after a "five year absence", saying "Every melody stands alone; every arrangement tops it off; every vocal nails it; every lyric parses with just enough mystery and mordant self-regard to make you crave some backstory." Stephen Thomas Erlewine of AllMusic stated, "Guitars roam wide-open spaces, couched in luxurious reverb and draped in strings; the rhythms often follow cool, steady eighth-note pulses; the surfaces always shimmer. It's such a sultry, soothing sound that it's easy to ignore the pain that lies beneath but that's a feature, not a bug: on The Voyager, Lewis' characters live for today without ever thinking that the world might pass them by, and having her music flow so smooth and easy, she illustrates how easy it is to get sucked into that alluring stasis." Nick Hagan of Drowned in Sound said, "All together, The Voyager’s balance of frothiness and fearless introspection make it something pretty special. It’s fun, compulsive listening, and really highlights Jenny Lewis’s songwriting credentials with a clutch of great, unpretentious pop songs. Some will undoubtedly find the high dose of kitsch a major irritant, but for apple pie Americana laced with star-gazing self awareness, Lewis is truly peerless." Stephen M. Deusner of Pitchfork said, "The Voyager is not quite so easily summed up. It’s not anchored in one particular scene, but plays as broadly California, with sly nods to the Byrds in the guitars, the Go-Go’s in the vocals, and Randy Newman in the wry humor." Erik Adams of The A.V. Club stated, "Newfound sophistication does nothing to dull the emotional punch of Lewis’ songwriting, though it makes an odd fit for some of her more off-the-cuff couplets."

Rolling Stone listed "Just One of the Guys" at No. 5 on a list of the top 50 songs of 2014.

Jessica Goodman and Ryan Kistobak of The Huffington Post included the album on their list of the year's best releases, calling it as a proof that "[Lewis] is not just a grown-up little girl".

== Commercial performance ==
The album debuted at number nine on the Billboard 200 chart, with first-week sales of 24,000 copies in the United States.

== Track listing ==
| No. | Title | Length |
|---|---|---|
| 1. | "Head Underwater" | 4:08 |
| 2. | "She's Not Me" | 4:09 |
| 3. | "Just One of the Guys" | 3:51 |
| 4. | "Slippery Slopes" | 3:38 |
| 5. | "Late Bloomer" | 5:13 |
| 6. | "You Can't Outrun 'Em" | 3:30 |
| 7. | "The New You" | 3:27 |
| 8. | "Aloha & the Three Johns" | 4:04 |
| 9. | "Love U Forever" | 4:28 |
| 10. | "The Voyager" | 3:30 |

== Charts ==
| Chart (2014–2024) | Peak position |
|---|---|
| Hungarian Physical Albums (MAHASZ) | 33 |
| Scottish Albums (OCC) | 40 |
| UK Albums (OCC) | 47 |
| US Billboard 200 | 9 |
| US Top Alternative Albums (Billboard) | 2 |
| US Top Rock Albums (Billboard) | 5 |
| US Indie Store Album Sales (Billboard) | 3 |
