= Jenny Lewis =

American musician and actress (born 1976)

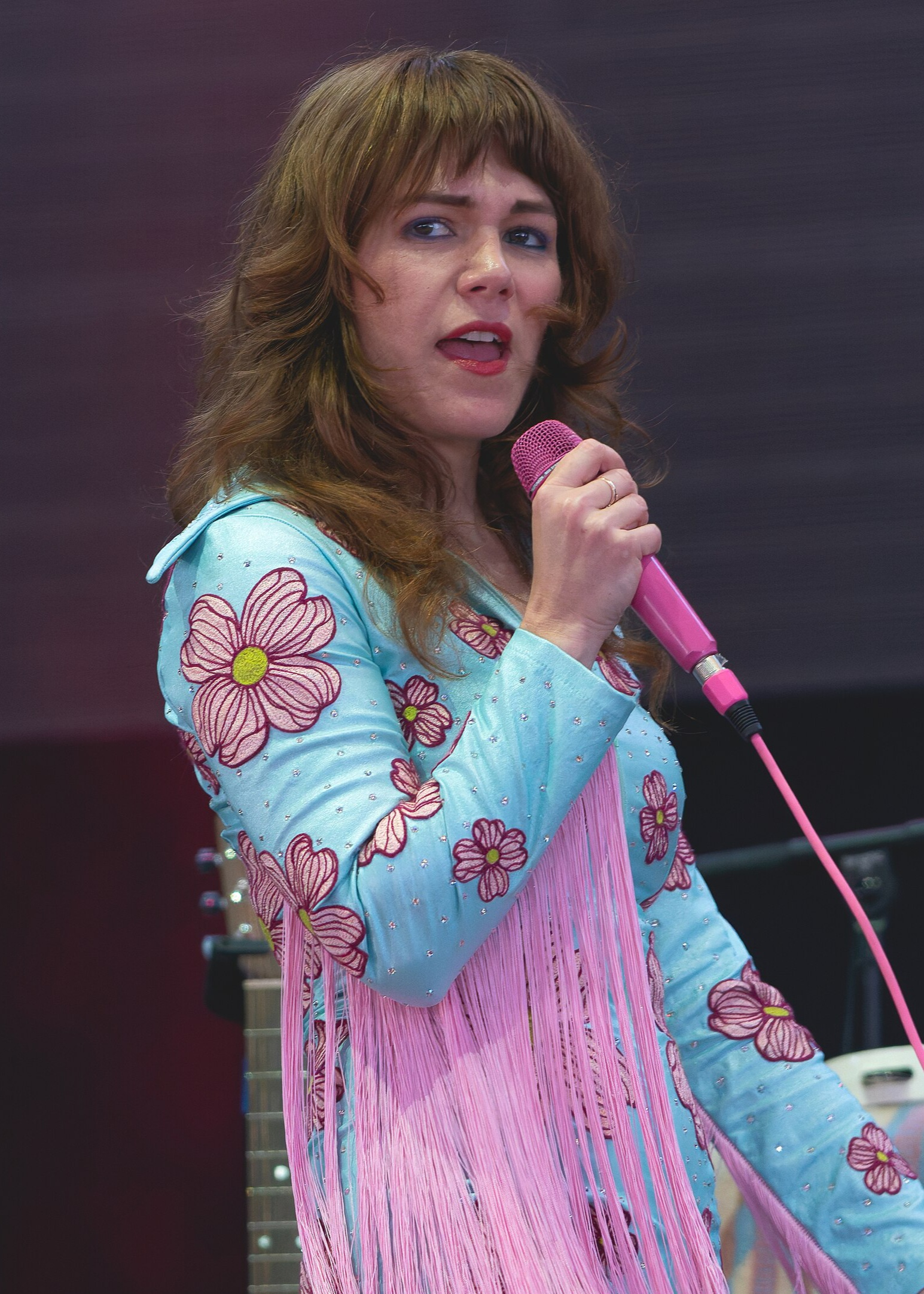
- Lewis performing in 2018

Background information
- Born: Jennifer Diane Lewis; January 8, 1976 (age 50); Las Vegas, Nevada, U.S.
- Origin: San Fernando Valley, California, U.S.
- Genres: Indie rock; alternative country; indie folk; indietronica
- Instruments: Vocals; keyboards; guitar; bass; harmonica
- Years active: 1982–2000, 2008–present (acting); 1998–present (music)
- Labels: Team Love; Warner Bros.; Brute/Beaute; Saddle Creek; Barsuk; Third Man
- Member of: Rilo Kiley
- Formerly of: The Postal Service; Jenny and Johnny; Nice as Fuck

Jennifer Diane Lewis (born January 8, 1976) is an American singer-songwriter and actress. She is the lead singer, rhythm guitarist, and keyboardist for the indie rock band Rilo Kiley, as well as a solo artist.

Lewis gained prominence in the 1980s as a child actress, appearing in the films Troop Beverly Hills (1989) and The Wizard (1989) and the television series Brooklyn Bridge (1991–1993). In the mid-1990s Lewis semi-retired from acting to focus on her musical career and formed Rilo Kiley in 1998 with fellow former child actor Blake Sennett. Rilo Kiley released four albums before they disbanded in 2014.

Lewis has released five solo albums: Rabbit Fur Coat (2006), Acid Tongue (2008), The Voyager (2014), On the Line (2019), and Joy'All (2023). In addition to Rilo Kiley and her solo career, Lewis has been a member of The Postal Service, Jenny & Johnny, and Nice as Fuck.

== Early life ==
Lewis was born in Las Vegas. Her mother Linda was a professional singer, and her father Eddie Gordon was a member of the Harmonica Gang. Lewis is of Ashkenazi Jewish descent.

== Acting career ==
Lewis made her professional debut in a Jell-O commercial. She later appeared in commercials for Mattel's Barbie and Baby Skates dolls, Toys "R" Us toy stores, the Black & Decker Popcorn Maker, and Kellogg's Corn Pops, among others. She was a contestant on a Young People's Week episode of the CBS game show Card Sharks starring Bob Eubanks on August 6, 1987, at age 11. She won $500 but did not win her match.

On television, she featured in the short-lived 1986 Lucille Ball sitcom Life With Lucy, where she was cast as one of Lucy's grandchildren, and later had recurring roles in Shannon's Deal and Brooklyn Bridge. She also had single-episode roles in shows such as Murder, She Wrote; The Twilight Zone (1985); Baywatch; The Golden Girls; Growing Pains; Just the Ten of Us; Roseanne; and Mr. Belvedere. She had roles in made-for-TV movies, including as Evangeline "Eva" Saint Claire in the 1987 adaptation of Uncle Tom's Cabin, in A Friendship in Vienna, Joe Dante's Runaway Daughters, and Talk to Me with Yasmine Bleeth.

Lewis also acted in feature films, including Troop Beverly Hills and The Wizard in 1989. She went on to be in Big Girls Don't Cry... They Get Even, Foxfire, and Pleasantville. She was also in Don's Plum, filmed 1995–96 – though it remains unreleased in the U.S.

In 2015 she appeared in the Netflix movie A Very Murray Christmas as a waitress and sang a few songs, including "Baby, It's Cold Outside" in a duet with Bill Murray.

== Music ==
=== Rilo Kiley ===
In 1998 Lewis and friends Pierre De Reeder, Dave Rock, and then-boyfriend Blake Sennett formed the band Rilo Kiley. Rock was eventually replaced by Jason Boesel. In an interview with NPR's All Songs Considered, Lewis remarked that she wanted to name the group Love's Way (after her parents' lounge act in Las Vegas), but Sennett "didn't go for it." Originally asked to sing back-up vocals by Sennett, Lewis refused to join the band unless she was able to sing lead vocals.

Beginning with a country sound, Rilo Kiley gravitated toward a downbeat indie rock sound, gaining the attention of Warner Bros., who signed the band (via its own imprint, Brute/Beaute Records) for the release of their 2004 album More Adventurous, garnering the band some success. Critics such as Pitchfork attributed this to the decision to emphasize Lewis's voice and presence more so than in previous albums. The song "Portions for Foxes" was a hit. Rilo Kiley's 2007 album Under the Blacklight was released directly by Warner Bros.

In 2011 Sennett hinted that Rilo Kiley had disbanded. Lewis confirmed the band's split in 2014.

A retrospective of Lewis's career by Jessica Roy in 2016 commented that Lewis was a style icon to a certain type of music-loving young people in the 2000s. Roy commented:

For a particular brand of suburban girl who fancied herself cooler than her peers, Jenny was a fire-haired figure of worship. With her endless supply of cool sunglasses, vintage dresses, and hats ... she was a beacon of hope for introspective teens ... as a microgenerational sad-girl touchstone, many of us have our own Jenny Lewis Anecdote, our lives touched by her magnificent tweeness in different ways.

The band reunited in 2025, embarking on a North American tour and playing at the Just Like Heaven Festival on May 10, 2025, at the Rose Bowl.

=== Solo career ===
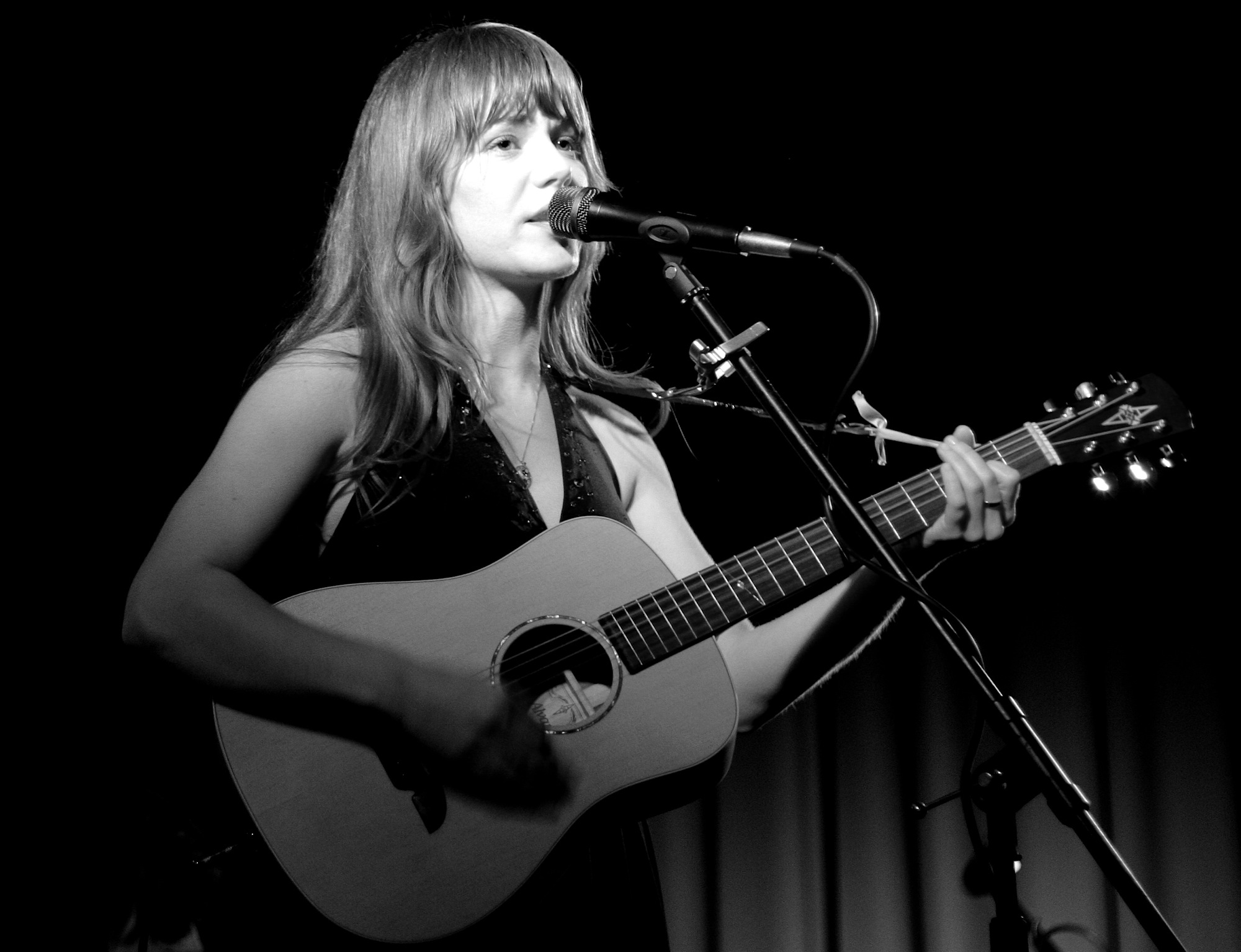
Lewis in 2006

In 2004 Conor Oberst invited Lewis to record a solo album for record label Team Love. Rabbit Fur Coat (released January 24, 2006) features contributions from Oberst, M. Ward, and Maroon 5 guitarist James Valentine. Ben Gibbard of Death Cab for Cutie guests on a cover of The Traveling Wilburys' "Handle With Care". The Watson Twins provide accompaniment on the album, billed as Jenny Lewis with the Watson Twins. Lewis toured with the Watson Twins in support of the album three times in 2006 and appeared with her band on the Late Show with David Letterman, The Late Late Show with Craig Ferguson, Late Night with Conan O'Brien, and Later with Jools Holland. They also appeared on a Washington, D.C.–based children's music program called Pancake Mountain, performing the song "See Fernando". The album received positive reviews with Entertainment Weekly writing, "Consider Lewis the Emmylou Harris of the Silverlake set" and Rolling Stone commenting that "her girlishly seductive vocals are more versatile than ever". The A.V. Club, Spin, and NPR music critic Meredith Ochs named it among the best albums of the year.

In 2008 Lewis released a second solo album, this time without the Watson Twins, titled Acid Tongue.

On July 29, 2014, Lewis released The Voyager. The album took five years to complete and is a reflection on Rilo Kiley's break-up and the death of her father. The release of the album was preceded by the single "Just One of the Guys". The music video for "Just One of the Guys" was released on July 15, 2014, through GQ and stars Lewis, Anne Hathaway, Kristen Stewart, Brie Larson, and Tennessee Thomas, former drummer of The Like (now disbanded). Lewis also directed the video.

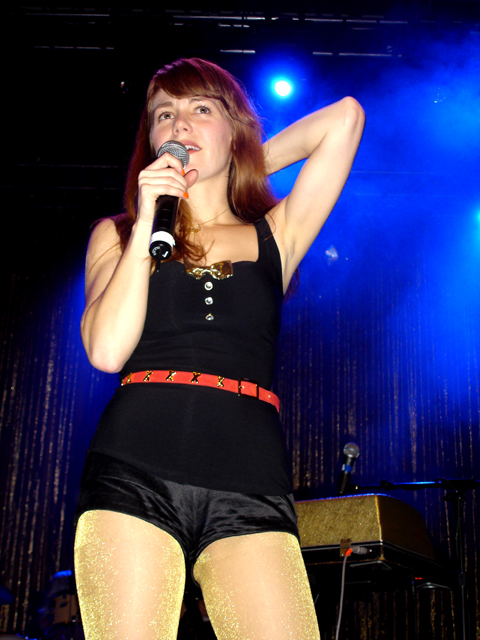
Lewis performing in 2007

In January 2019 Lewis announced the release date of her new album On the Line would be March 22, 2019. The lead single "Red Bull & Hennessy" garnered positive acclaim.

On June 9, 2023, Lewis released a new album, Joy'All. She had started writing for Joy'All while on tour to promote On the Line, shortly before the start of the COVID-19 pandemic. Work resumed on the album in early 2021 when Lewis participated in a virtual songwriting workshop hosted by Beck. The album was produced by Dave Cobb, who Lewis met while visiting Lucius at RCA Studio A in Nashville, Tennessee.

=== Other projects and collaborations ===
In 2002 Lewis was asked to contribute vocals for the band The Postal Service before eventually becoming a full-fledged member, sharing vocals and instrumentation in their live shows. She toured with the band in 2013 and again in 2023.

In 2003 Lewis contributed vocals to several tracks on the Cursive album The Ugly Organ.

In 2005 Lewis contributed to the UNICEF benefit song "Do They Know It's Hallowe'en?", along with Sennett and Jimmy Tamborello.

In 2006 Lewis made a cameo in Episode 25, Season 1 of Bob Dylan's Theme Time Radio Hour, and six of her songs (three with the Watson Twins and three with Rilo Kiley) were featured in various episodes of the show.

Lewis contributed vocals to various songs on Johnathan Rice's 2007 album Further North, and she appeared in the music video for "We're All Stuck Out In The Desert (And We're Gonna Die)".

She provided vocals for a track on Dntel's Dumb Luck LP, released in 2007.

In 2008 Lewis contributed backing vocals to several songs on the Elvis Costello and the Imposters album Momofuku.

Later that year Lewis voiced the role of the assistant director for Walt Disney Pictures' animated film Bolt (2008), and she also provided the song "Barking at the Moon".

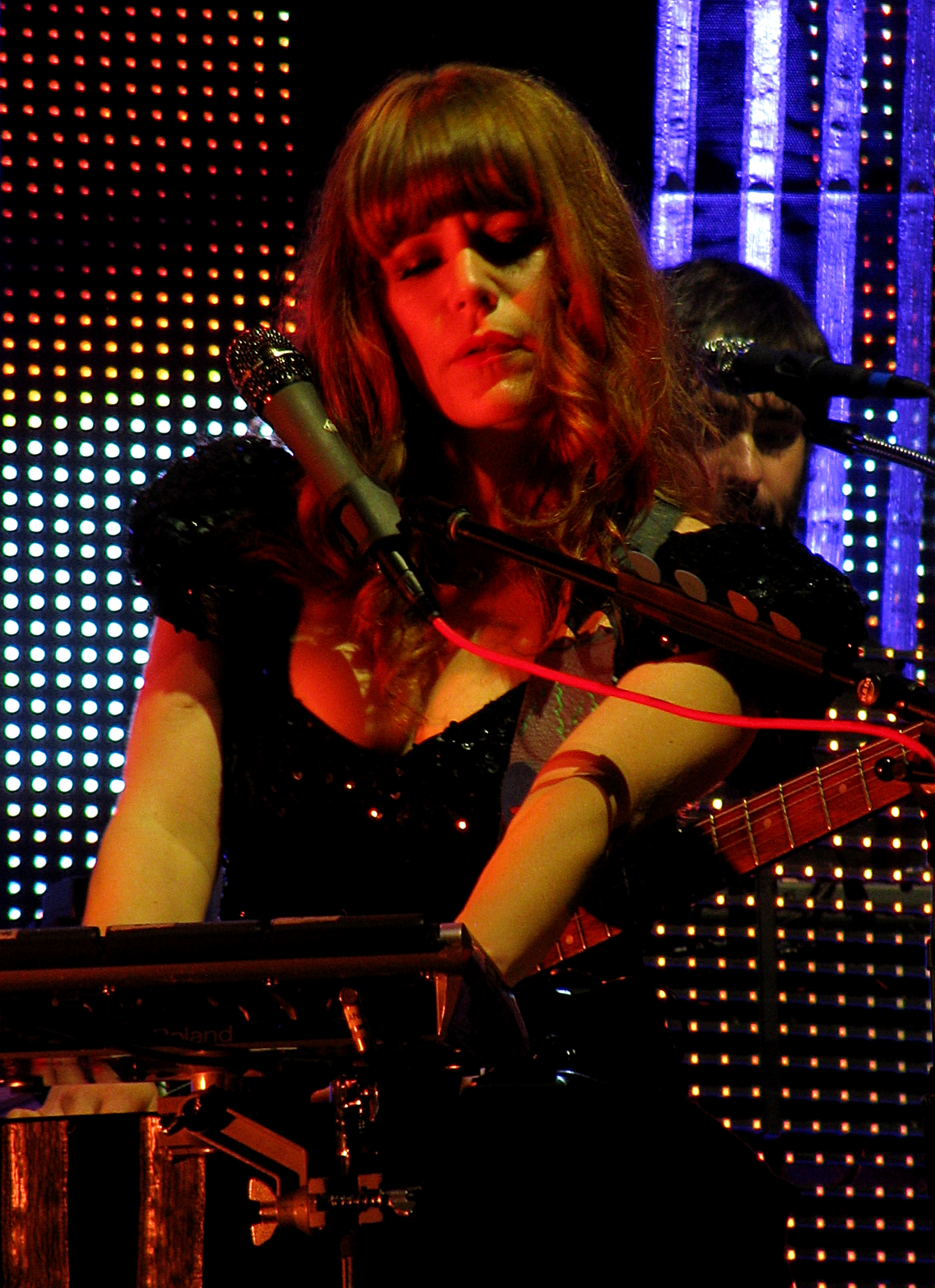
Jenny Lewis at The Postal Service Goodbye in Lollapalooza 2013, Chicago

Lewis makes an appearance on the track "Hard Enough", taken from the 2010 album Flamingo by fellow Las Vegan Brandon Flowers.

In 2013 Lewis created the music score for Tribeca Film's feature Very Good Girls. She provided original music and also included older music from her previous band Rilo Kiley, such as "Go Ahead".

In 2013 Lewis contributed backing vocals to the songs "Afraid of Heights" and "Hippies Is Punks" by Wavves.

In 2014 Lewis contributed an exclusive track to HBO's Girls in collaboration with Vampire Weekend's Rostam Batmanglij titled "Completely Not Me". The song was featured in the Season 3 premiere "Females Only". The song is the second track on Girls Volume Two: All Adventurous Women Do.

In 2016 Lewis contributed to She & Him's second Christmas album, Christmas Party, appearing on the track "Winter Wonderland".

On October 28, 2019, Lewis was featured in the fifth issue of Archie Comics' comic book series Jughead's Time Police, released on October 30.

=== Other bands ===
In 2010 Lewis formed the duo Jenny and Johnny with her then-boyfriend, musician Johnathan Rice, and the pair released an album titled I'm Having Fun Now on Warner Bros. Records. Rice and Lewis wrote the song "Cold One" for the 2015 film Ricki and the Flash.

In 2016 the trio Nice as Fuck, comprising Lewis, Erika Forster (of Au Revoir Simone), and Tennessee Thomas (of The Like), debuted at a Bernie Sanders benefit. The group opened on a number of tour dates for M. Ward.

== Filmography ==
=== Films ===
Year	Film	Role	Notes	Ref.
1988	Trading Hearts	Yvonne Rhonda Nottingham	Film	
1989	Troop Beverly Hills	Hannah Nefler	Film	
1989	The Wizard	Haley	Film	
1992	Big Girls Don't Cry... They Get Even	Corinne	Film	
1996	Run a Mile in My Shoes		Short film	
1996	Foxfire	Rita Faldes	Film	
1997	Little Boy Blue	Traci Connor	Film	
1998	Pleasantville	Christin	Film	
2001	Don's Plum	Sara	Film; filmed 1995–96, but unreleased in the U.S.	
2008	Bolt	Assistant Director (voice)	Film; also has two songs featured on the film's soundtrack	

=== Television ===
Year	Film	Notes	Ref.
1983	Baby Makes Five	TV series; episode: "Pilot"	
1983	It's an Adventure, Charlie Brown	TV film; voice role of Ruby	
1985	Suburban Beat	TV film	
1985	The Twilight Zone	TV series; segment: "If She Dies"	
1986	Convicted	TV film; as Shelley Forbes	
1986	Webster	TV series; episode: "The Truth Hurts"	
1986	Life With Lucy	TV series; 13 episodes, as Lucy's grandchild Becky McGibbon	
1987	Uncle Tom's Cabin	TV film; as Evangeline	
1987	The Golden Girls	TV series; episode: "Old Friends", as Daisy, a Sunshine Cadet	
1987	The Charmings	TV series; episode: "A Charming Halloween"	
1988	A Place at the Table	TV film	
1988	Who Gets the Friends?	TV film	
1988	My Father, My Son	TV film	
1988	A Friendship in Vienna	TV film	
1988	Mr. Belvedere	TV series; episode: "Braces"	
1988	Growing Pains	TV series	
1988	Baby M	TV miniseries	
1989	Just the Ten of Us	TV series; episode: "Puberty Blues"	
1989	Have Faith	TV series; episode: "The Teacher"	
1989	Shannon's Deal	TV film; later adapted as a TV series of the same name, as Neala Shannon	
1989	Roseanne	TV series; episode: "Five of a Kind"	
1989	Free Spirit	TV series; episode: "Hallowinnie"	
1989	Baywatch	TV series; episode: "Shelter Me"	
1990	Perry Mason: The Case of the Defiant Daughter	TV film	
1991	Brooklyn Bridge	TV series; 18 episodes, as Katie Monahan	
1991	Line of Fire: The Morris Dees Story	TV film; as Ellie Dees	
1991	Shannon's Deal	TV series; as Neala Shannon	
1991	Runaway Father	TV film	
1991	Daddy	TV film, as Melissa Watson	
1994	Murder, She Wrote	TV series; episode: "A Murderous Muse"	
1994	Runaway Daughters	TV film; originally aired as an episode of the TV series Rebel Highway	
1996	Sweet Temptation	TV film	
1996	Talk to Me	TV film, as Kelly	
1999	Get Real	TV series; episode: "Anatomy of a Rumor"	
2000	Once and Again	TV series; as self	
2010	American Dad!	TV series; episode: "Merlot Down Dirty Shame"	
2014	Comedy Bang Bang	TV series; replacement bandleader, filling in for Reggie Watts (episode: "Zach Galifianakis Wears a One-Armed Jacket")	
2015	A Very Murray Christmas	TV film; Netflix Original	
2019	Jenny Lewis' On the Line Online	JennyLewis.com streaming special	

== Discography ==
=== Rilo Kiley ===
- Rilo Kiley (1999)
- Take Offs and Landings (2001)
- The Execution of All Things (2002)
- More Adventurous (2004)
- Under the Blacklight (2007)
- Rkives (2013)

=== Solo ===
- Rabbit Fur Coat (2006) (with The Watson Twins)
- Acid Tongue (2008)
- The Voyager (2014)
- On the Line (2019)
- Joy'All (2023)

=== Jenny & Johnny ===
- I'm Having Fun Now (2010)
- Live at Third Man Records (2010)

=== Nice as Fuck ===
- Nice as Fuck (2016)

=== Other appearances ===
- Bright Eyes – Lifted or The Story is in the Soil, Keep Your Ear to the Ground (2002, Saddle Creek)
- Cursive – The Ugly Organ (2003, Saddle Creek)
- The Postal Service – Give Up (2003, Sub Pop)
- The Good Life – Album of the Year (2004, Saddle Creek)
- The Watson Twins – Southern Manners (2006)
- Dntel – Dumb Luck (2007, Sub Pop)
- Whispertown 2000 – Livin' in a Dream (2007)
- Elvis Costello and the Imposters – Momofuku (2008, Lost Highway Records)
- Whispertown 2000 – Swim (2009)
- Brandon Flowers – "Hard Enough" from Flamingo (2010, Island/Vertigo)
- Wavves – Afraid of Heights (2013)
- EZTV – Calling Out (2016)
- She & Him – Christmas Party (2016)
- Paul Shaffer – Paul Shaffer & The World's Most Dangerous Band (2017)
- King Tuff – The Other (2018)
- Vampire Weekend – "2021" (2019)
- The Cactus Blossoms — "Everybody" (2022)

== Videography ==
- Rilo Kiley – "The Frug" (1999, directed by Morgan J. Freeman)
- Rilo Kiley – "Wires and Waves" (filmed 2001/released 2007, directed by Morgan J. Freeman)
- Rilo Kiley - "Bulletproof" (2001, directed by Liam Lynch)
- The Postal Service – "The District Sleeps Alone Tonight" (2003) (Backing Vocals)
- Rilo Kiley – "Portions for Foxes" (2004, directed by Brian Lazzaro)
- Rilo Kiley – "It's a Hit" (2005, directed by Andrew Bruntel, Matt Enlow)
- The Postal Service – "We Will Become Silhouettes" (2005, directed by Jared Hess)
- Jenny Lewis with the Watson Twins – "Rise Up with Fists!!" (2006, directed by Autumn de Wilde)
- Rilo Kiley – "The Moneymaker" (2007, directed by Autumn de Wilde)
- Rilo Kiley – "Silver Lining" (2007, directed by Autumn de Wilde)
- Jenny Lewis – "Black Sand" (2009, directed by Justin Mitchell)
- Jenny Lewis – "See Fernando" (2009, directed by Alan Tanner)
- Jenny Lewis – "Carpetbaggers" (2009, directed by Justin Mitchell)
- Jenny and Johnny – "Big Wave" (2011, directed by Autumn de Wilde)
- The Postal Service – "A Tattered Line of String" (2013, directed by AB/CD/CD) (Backing Vocals)
- Rilo Kiley – "Let Me Back In" (2013, directed by Rilo Kiley)
- Rilo Kiley – "Emotional" (2013, directed by Austin Nagler)
- Jenny Lewis – "Just One Of The Guys" (2014, directed by Jenny Lewis)
- Jenny Lewis – "She's Not Me" (2015, directed by Jenny Lewis)
- Nice as Fuck – "Door" (2016, directed by Jenny Lewis)
- Nice as Fuck – "Guns" (2016, directed by Luke Rathborne)
- Jenny Lewis – "Red Bull & Hennessy" (2019, directed by Eric Notarnicola)
- Jenny Lewis – "Rabbit Hole" (2019, directed by Eric Notarnicola)
- Artists for Peace and Justice: Jonathan Wilson, Jenny Lewis, Sanba Zao, and Jackson Browne – "Lapé, Lanmou (Peace and Love)" (2019, directed by APJ)
- Artists for Peace and Justice: Jenny Lewis with Habib Koité – "Under the Supermoon" (2020, directed by David Belle)
- Jenny Lewis with Serengeti - "Unblu" (2020, directed by Jenny Lewis)
- Jenny Lewis with Serengeti - "Vroom Vroom" (2021, directed by Jenny Lewis)
