= Tamara Braun =

American actress

- Braun in 2026
- Born: April 18, 1971 (age 55); Evanston, Illinois, U.S.
- Occupation: Actress
- Years active: 1997–present
- Known for: Performance in American soap opera television
- Television: General Hospital (2001–2005, 2014, 2017–2019); Days of Our Lives (2008, 2011, 2015–2016, 2020–2025); All My Children (2008–2009)

Tamara Braun (born April 18, 1971) is an American actress known for her work on daytime television. She portrayed the role of Carly Corinthos on General Hospital from 2001–2005 and Reese Williams on All My Children from 2008 to 2009. In 2009, Braun won the Daytime Emmy Award for Best Supporting Actress for her portrayal of Ava Vitali on Days of Our Lives. She departed the series in 2008, briefly returning in the role of Taylor Walker during 2011. In 2015, Braun resumed the role of Ava as part of the series' 50th anniversary commemoration, remaining until 2016.

In 2017, 12 years after exiting her role as Carly on General Hospital, Braun returned to the soap as Kim Nero, the single mother of Oscar, the boyfriend of Carly’s daughter Josslyn. In 2020, Braun received her second Daytime Emmy for her work as Kim. That same year, Braun transitioned to Days of Our Lives to reprise the role of Ava, which she left again in late 2022.

== Early life and education ==
Tamara Braun was born in the Chicago suburb of Evanston, Illinois, to a family of Jewish descent.

== Career ==
Braun is well known for her win at the 2009 Daytime Emmy Awards, receiving the accolade of Outstanding Supporting Actress for the role of Ava Vitali on Days of our Lives. She is also well known for her Emmy-nominated portrayal of Carly Corinthos on the ABC soap opera General Hospital, a role she played from 2001 to 2005. As Carly, Braun was featured very prominently as a romantic partner of characters Sonny Corinthos, portrayed by Daytime Emmy winner Maurice Benard, and Lorenzo Alcazar, portrayed by Ted King.

After leaving General Hospital, Braun played the female lead in the independent movie Little Chenier, which was filmed in Louisiana in August 2005. Braun worked with a dialect coach to perfect a Cajun accent, and she altered her appearance by getting a bronzed tan and darkening her hair. Tamara appeared as pastry chef Rose on four episodes of the ABC sitcom Freddie as a romantic interest of both lead male characters. Tamara has also starred in the independent film Limbo Lounge, directed by Tom Pankratz. In 2006 and 2007 respectively, Braun appeared on the CBS hit shows Cold Case and Ghost Whisperer; in the former she portrayed a country singer who helped cover up the murder of a fellow singer in order to protect her career. Additionally, she appeared in the 2007 season premiere of Without a Trace.

In 2008, Braun joined the cast of the NBC soap opera Days of our Lives in the Emmy-winning role of Ava Vitali, a woman from long-time veteran Stephen Nichols' character Steve Johnson's past. She left the soap in August 2008, but would go on to win a Daytime Emmy award for Best Supporting Actress for her portrayal of Ava Vitali.

Later that year she joined the cast of All My Children as Reese Williams, her second soap opera role since leaving General Hospital in April 2005.

In July 2009, she landed the recurring role of Renee Ellen on the TNT show Saving Grace, starring Holly Hunter.

On February 15, 2011, Soap Opera Digest announced Braun would return to Days of Our Lives, in the new role of Taylor Walker, replacing actress Natalia Livingston. On June 7, 2011, Braun was let go from Days of Our Lives; she made her final appearance as Taylor on September 22, 2011. In July 2015, it was announced that Braun would reprise her portrayal of Ava on Days of Our Lives, in celebration of the soap's fiftieth anniversary. She departed the role in March 2016.

In October 2017, Entertainment Weekly announced Braun would return to General Hospital once again, this time in a new role. She made her first appearance as Kim Nero on November 22, 2017. She left the role in 2019. The following year, it was announced she would return to Days of Our Lives as Ava. She returned to the role in November 2020.

In April 2025, Braun announced she had wrapped filming as Ava in July of the previous year; she departed the role that same month on April 3. That August, it was announced she had joined the cast of The Young and the Restless. She made her first appearance as Sienna Bacall on October 14.

== Filmography ==
=== Film ===
| Year | Title | Role | Notes |
|---|---|---|---|
| 1998 | Fallen Arches | Jenny | |
| 2006 | Little Chenier | Marie-Louise LeBauve | |
| 2010 | Limbo Lounge | Anya | |
| 2014 | Pretty Rosebud | Candace | |
| 2017 | Abduction of Angie | June | |
| 2017 | Stalked By My Ex | Chloe | Television film (Lifetime) |
| 2026 | Drifter | Rosie | Post-production |

=== Television ===
| Year | Title | Role | Notes |
|---|---|---|---|
| 1997 | The Sentinel | Stacey Neumann | Episode: "Sleeping Beauty" |
| 1997 | City Guys | Allison | Episode: "The College Girl" |
| 1997 | Buffy the Vampire Slayer | Tara | Episode: "When She Was Bad" |
| 1998 | Party of Five | Marcy | Episode: "Parent Trap" |
| 1998 | The Magnificent Seven | Virginia | Episode: "Witness" |
| 1998 | 7th Heaven | Ellen | Episode: "Let's Talk About Sex" |
| 1998 | Unhappily Ever After | Nell / Lacy | Episodes: "Love Letters", "Secrets" |
| 1999 | The Pretender | Claire Dunning | Episode: "Murder 101" |
| 1999 | DiResta | Amanda | Episode: "One Wedding and a Funeral" |
| 2001 | Off Centre | Lisa | Episodes: "Pilot", "Let's Meet Mike and Euan" |
| 2001–05, 2014; 2017–19 | General Hospital | Carly Corinthos; Kim Nero | Regular role (515 episodes); Series Regular |
| 2005–06 | Freddie | Rose | 4 Episodes |
| 2006 | House | Grace Palmieri | Episode: "House vs. God" |
| 2006 | Cold Case | Edie Lowe | Episode: "The Red and the Blue" |
| 2007 | Ghost Whisperer | Brenda Sanborn | Episode: "Deja Boo" |
| 2007 | Without a Trace | Kate Douglas | Episode: "Lost Boy" |
| 2008, 2015–16, 2020–2025 | Days of Our Lives | Ava Vitali | Regular role |
| 2008 | CSI: Crime Scene Investigation | Coco | Episode: "Bull" |
| 2008–09 | All My Children | Reese Williams | Regular role (82 episodes) |
| 2009 | Saving Grace | Renee Ellen | Episodes: "That Was No First Kiss", "Looks Like a Lesbian Attack to Me" |
| 2009 | Three Rivers | Samantha Krauser | Episode: "Where We Lie" |
| 2011 | Days of Our Lives | Taylor Walker | Regular role (138 episodes) |
| 2012 | Castle | Natalia Roosevelt | Episode: "Murder He Wrote" |
| 2013 | Necessary Roughness | Ronnie | Episode: "The Fall Guy" |
| 2013 | Supernatural | Cindy Cassity | Episode: "Trial and Error" |
| 2017 | Bosch | Helen Archer | Episode: "God Sees" |
| 2019 | The Rookie | Elizabeth Ohlsen | Episode: "Manhunt" |
| 2023 | Kombucha Cure | Dr. Mara Cohen | Series Regular Amazon Prime Original Series |
| 2025 | The Young and the Restless | Sienna Bacall | Role held since October 14, 2025 |

== Awards and nominations ==
List of awards and nominations
| Year | Film /TV | Award | Category | Result |
|---|---|---|---|---|
| 2000 | General Hospital | M.Y.S.O Award | Outstanding Supporting Actress in a Daytime Drama | Won |
| 2004 | General Hospital | Daytime Emmy Award | Outstanding Lead Actress in a Drama Series | Nominated |
| 2005 | General Hospital | Soap Opera Digest Award | Best Leading Actress in a Daytime Drama | Won |
| 2005 | General Hospital | M.Y.S.O Award | Outstanding Lead Actress in a Daytime Drama | Won |
| 2007 | Little Chenier | Honolulu International Film Festival | Best Actress | Won |
| 2007 | Little Chenier | Phoenix Film Festival | Best Ensemble Cast | Won |
| 2007 | Little Chenier | Copper Wing Award | Best Actress | Nominated |
| 2009 | Days of Our Lives | Daytime Emmy Award | Outstanding Supporting Actress in a Drama Series | Won |
| 2009 | Days of Our Lives | Soapy Television Awards | Best Villain | Nominated |
| 2020 | Death With Dignity | Valley Theatre Award | Lead Actress In A Play | Pending |
| 2020 | General Hospital | Daytime Emmy Award | Outstanding Supporting Actress in a Drama Series | Won |
| 2020 | General Hospital | Soap Hub Awards | Favorite General Hospital Actress | Nominated |
| 2021 | Days of Our Lives | Daytime Emmy Award | Outstanding Supporting Actress in a Drama Series | Nominated |
| 2021 | Days of Our Lives | Soap Hub Awards | Favorite Days of Our Lives Actress | Nominated |
| 2024 | Days of Our Lives | Daytime Emmy Award | Outstanding Lead Actress in a Drama Series | Nominated |

| Preceded by Sarah Joy Brown | Carly Corinthos actress 2001–2005 | Succeeded by Jennifer Bransford |

| Preceded by Natalia Livingston | Taylor Walker actress 2011 | Succeeded by None |
