= Cajuns =

Louisiana French ethnicity

Cadjins (French)
- The flag of Acadiana, the Cajun Country

Total population
- 94,395 (2023 estimate); 598,000 (1990 estimate)

Regions with significant populations
- Acadiana, Louisiana, Texas, Alabama, Mississippi, and California

Languages
- French (Louisiana French); English (Cajun English); Spanish (Isleño Spanish); Louisiana Creole; Franglais; Frespañol

Religion
- Christianity—predominantly Roman Catholicism

Related ethnic groups
- Acadians, French Louisianians, White Southerners, Black Southerners, French-Canadian Americans, Louisiana Creoles, Isleños, Haitians (Saint-Domingue Creoles), Creoles of color

The Cajuns (/ˈkeɪ.dʒənz/; French: les Cadjins [le kadʒɛ̃] or les Cadiens [le kadjɛ̃]; Spanish: Cajunes), also known as Louisiana Acadians (French: les Acadiens), are an American ethnic group mainly found in the US state of Louisiana and the surrounding Gulf Coast states.

Historically, Cajuns are the descendants of the Acadian exiles who went to Louisiana (especially to Acadiana) in the decades after le grand dérangement. Cajuns make up a significant portion of South Louisiana's population and have had an enormous impact on the state's culture.

While Lower Louisiana had been settled by French colonists since the late 17th century, many Cajuns trace their roots to the influx of Acadian settlers after the Great Expulsion from their homeland during the French and British hostilities prior to the French and Indian War (1756 to 1763). Most Acadians can trace their ancestry to approximately 50 families who were living in Port Royal, Acadia, now Annapolis Royal, Nova Scotia, in 1671. The Acadia region to which many modern Cajuns trace their origin consisted largely of what are now Nova Scotia, New Brunswick, Prince Edward Island plus parts of eastern Quebec and northern Maine.

Since their establishment in Louisiana, the Cajuns have become famous for their French dialect, Louisiana French, and have developed a rich culture including folkways, music, and cuisine. Acadiana is heavily associated with them.

The contention that Cajuns are a subgroup of Creoles is contested by members of the community, as is understandable given their diverse history and culture. The terms Cajun and Creole are to be seen as separate identities, although not everyone who is culturally Cajun must be descended from Acadian refugees. The two groups, which share a strong French heritage (though acquired in different places), have interacted intensely throughout their common history in Louisiana. They can thus be jointly addressed as Louisianais, implying the "people of French heritage of Louisiana", or French Louisianians.

== Etymology and historical usage of the term ==
The English term Cajun derives from the Louisiana French Cadien, also written Cadjin (pronounced /kadjɛ̃/ or /kadʒɛ̃/), in turn a shortening or aphetic form of French Acadien (Acadian). This derives from the name of the Canadian region Acadia, i.e., Acadie or La Cadie in French. The first form of the name, given to the region by explorer Giovanni da Verrazzano in 1524, was Arcadie, referring to the Greek region of the same name, Arcadia.

=== Civil War usage ===
The first usage of the term "Cajun" came about during the American Civil War, during the Union's invasion of French Louisiana.

After conquering Vermilionville—the modern city of Lafayette, the hub of Cajun country—in 1863, Lieutenant George C. Harding of the 21st Indiana Infantry used the term "Cajun" to describe the region's inhabitants:

I will try and tell what a Cajun is. He is a half-savage creature, of mixed French and Indian blood, lives in swamps and subsists by cultivating small patches of corn and sweet potatoes. The wants of the Cajun are few, and his habits are simple ... I can not say that we were abused by the Cajuns.

A correspondent for the New York Herald reported: "Our forces captured some prisoners. Many deserters and refugees came within our lines. The rebel deserters are principally French Creoles, or Arcadians ..."

In 1863, war correspondent Theophilus Noel reported for his newspaper: "You must not use the word Cagin, implying thereby that there is any nigger blood in the party to whom you are talking."

=== Cajun Country/Creole City usage ===
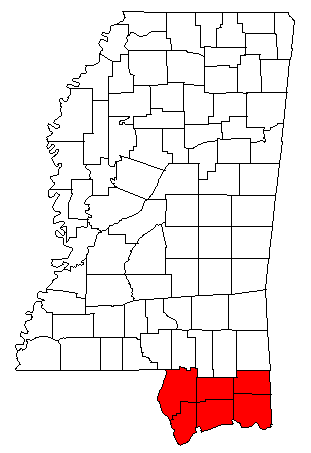
Mississippi Cajun Country

After the Civil War, urban Creoles began referring to the peasant class (petits habitants) as "Cajuns". Cajuns inhabited the "Cajun Countries" of Mississippi and Louisiana.

At the same time, "Creole" increasingly referred to Creoles of the middle class (bourgeoisie) or aristocratic class (grands habitants), and served as a designation for inhabitants of the "Creole Cities": Mobile, Alabama and New Orleans, Louisiana.

Carl Brasseaux notes in Acadian to Cajun, Transformation of a People, that:

Cajun was used by Anglos to refer to all persons of French descent and low economic standing, regardless of their ethnic affiliation. Hence poor Creoles of the bayou and prairie regions came to be permanently identified as Cajun. The term Cajun thus became a socioeconomic classification for the multicultural amalgam of several culturally and linguistically distinct groups.

=== Americanized usage ===
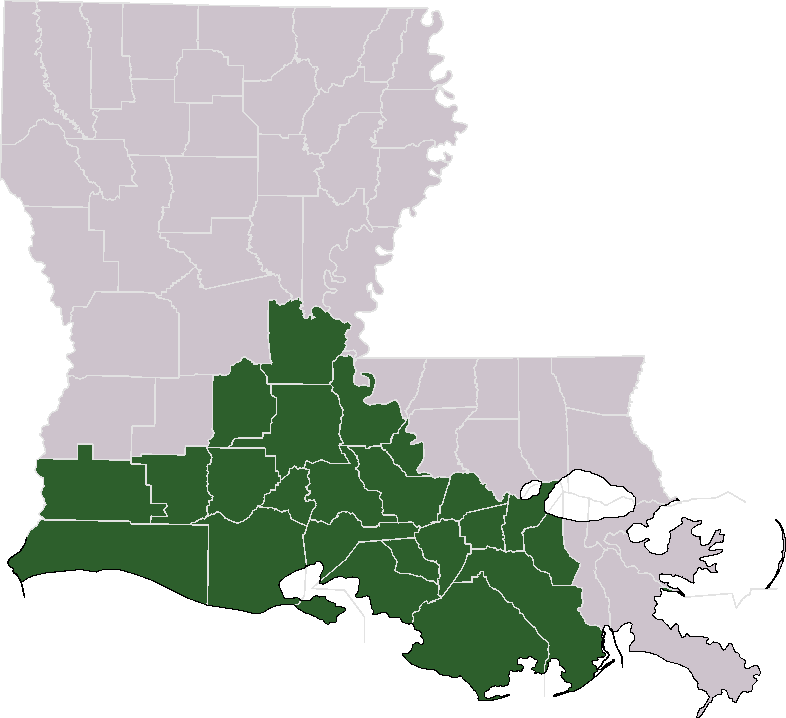
Acadiana

After the Americanization of Acadiana between the 1950s and 1970s, the term "Cajun" became synonymous with "white French Louisianian", due in part to CODOFIL's decision to promote Louisiana's link to Acadia in the "Cajun Renaissance".

It is common to see various demographic differences assigned to the Cajun/Creole binary. A typical example is cuisine: Many claim that "Cajun" gumbo does not include tomatoes whereas "Creole" gumbo does, but this distinction is better viewed as geographic rather than ethnic. Residents of Acadiana—a historically isolated and rural region—do not typically make gumbo with tomatoes, regardless of ancestry or self-proclaimed identity, whereas urban New Orleanians do. Technically, "Cajun" cuisine should properly fit under the umbrella of "Creole" cuisine, much like "Cajuns" themselves traditionally fit under the "Creole" umbrella.

In contrast to the 19th and early 20th centuries, today's Cajuns and Creoles are often presented as distinct groups, and some Cajuns disavow a Creole identity whereas others embrace it. Surnames and geographic location are not necessarily markers of either identity.

== Cajun nationality ==
=== Ethnic group of national origin ===
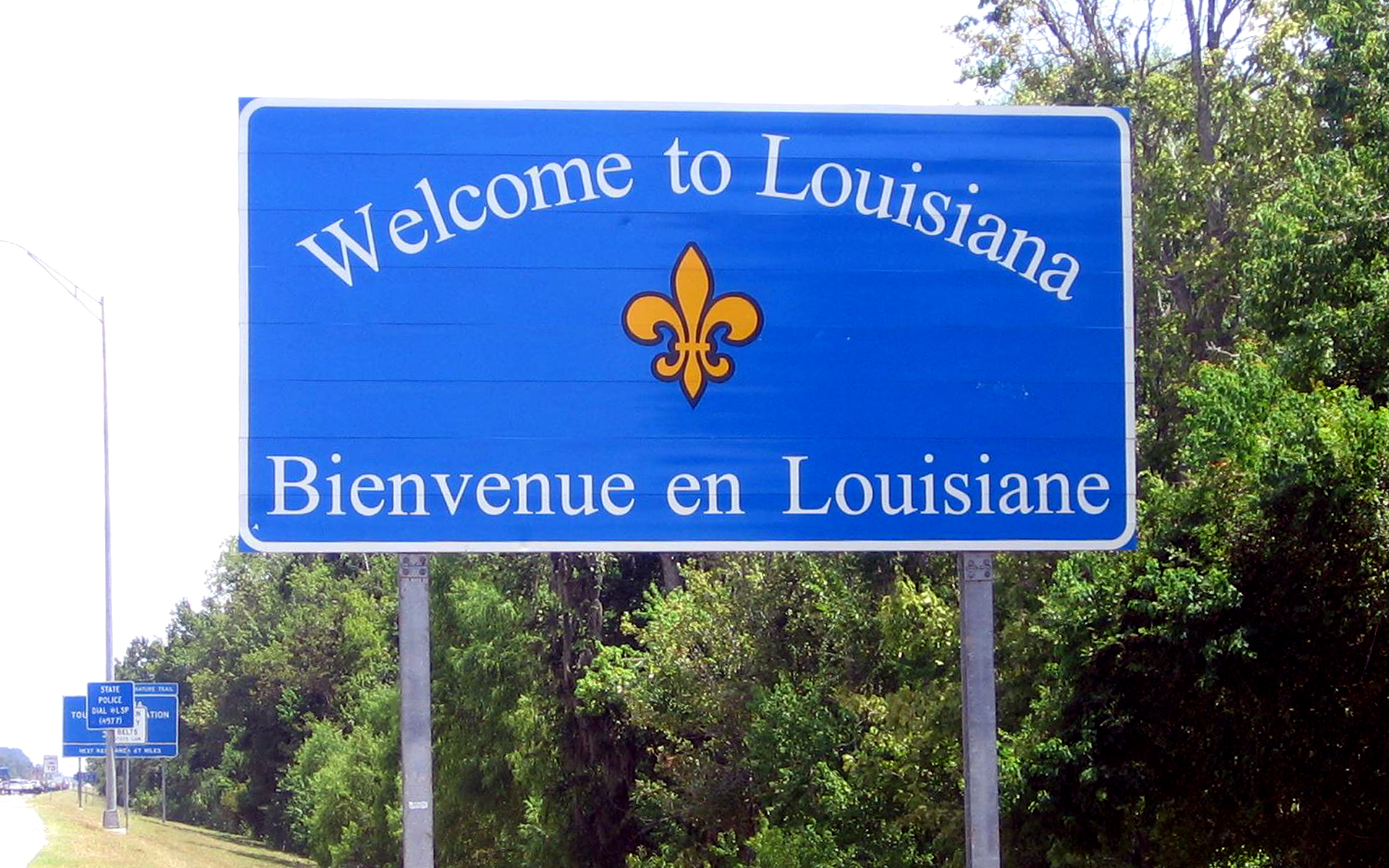
Cajun French is spoken in Louisiana.

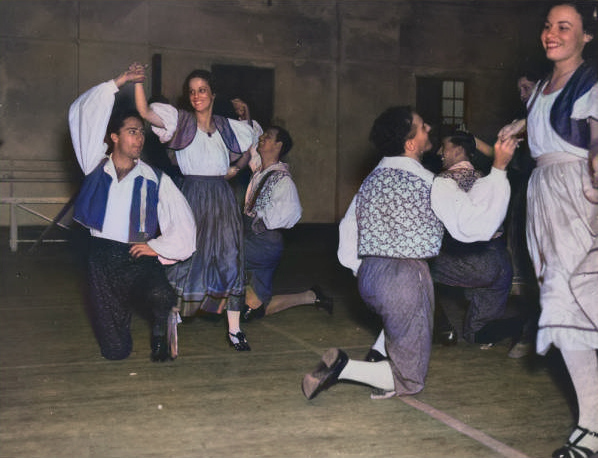
Cajun dancers in traditional clothing, 1940; colorized in 2022.

The Cajuns retain a unique dialect of the French language called Louisiana French, or, more commonly known as Cajun French, and hold numerous other cultural traits that distinguish them as an ethnic group. Cajuns were officially recognized by the U.S. government as a national ethnic group in 1980 per a discrimination lawsuit filed in federal district court. Presided over by Judge Edwin Hunter. The case, known as Roach v. Dresser Industries Valve and Instrument Division (494 F.Supp. 215, D.C. La., 1980), hinged on the issue of the Cajuns' ethnicity:

We conclude that plaintiff is protected by Title VII's ban on national origin discrimination. The Louisiana Acadian is alive and well. He is "up front" and "main stream." He is not asking for any special treatment. By affording coverage under the "national origin" clause of Title VII he is afforded no special privilege. He is given only the same protection as those with English, Spanish, French, Iranian, Czechoslovakian, Portuguese, Polish, Mexican, Italian, Irish, et al., ancestors.

— Judge Edwin Hunter, 1980

=== History of Acadian ancestors ===
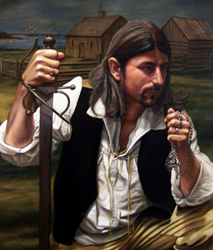
2009 artist's rendition of Acadian militia captain Joseph "Beausoleil" Broussard (1702–1765).

The British conquest of Acadia happened in 1710. Over the next 45 years, the Acadians refused to sign an unconditional oath of allegiance to the Crown. During this period, Acadians participated in various military operations against the British and maintained vital supply lines to the French fortress of Louisbourg and Fort Beausejour. During the French and Indian War (part of the Seven Years' War and known by that name in Canada and Europe), the British sought to neutralize the Acadian military threat and to interrupt their vital supply lines to Louisbourg by deporting Acadians from Acadia. The territory of Acadia was afterward divided and apportioned to various British colonies, now Canadian provinces: Nova Scotia, New Brunswick, Prince Edward Island, the Gaspé Peninsula in the province of Quebec. The deportation of the Acadians from these areas beginning in 1755 has become known as the Great Upheaval or Le Grand Dérangement.

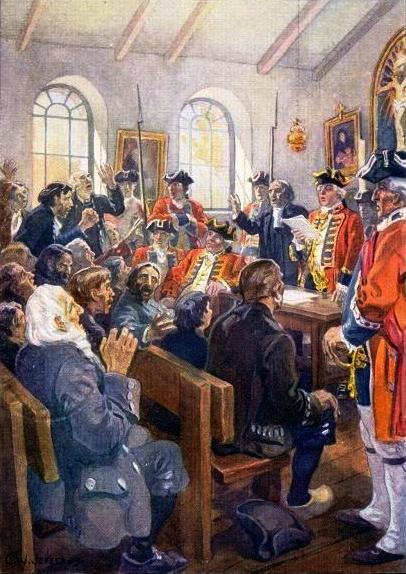
1923 illustration of the 1755 deportation of the Acadians.

The Acadians' migration from Canada was spurred by the 1763 Treaty of Paris which ended the war. The treaty terms provided 18 months for unrestrained emigration. Many Acadians moved to the Attakapas region of present-day Louisiana, often travelling via the French colony of Saint-Domingue (now Haiti).

The first group of Acadians to arrive in Louisiana was the Cormier-Landry-Poirier-Richard party, 21 people who sailed on the Savannah Packet from Savannah to Mobile to New Orleans, arriving in February 1764. A year later, Joseph Broussard led the first large group, 200 Acadians, which arrived in New Orleans on February 27, 1765, aboard the Santo Domingo. On April 8, 1765, he was appointed militia captain and commander of the "Acadians of the Atakapas" region in St. Martinville. Some of the settlers wrote to their family scattered around the Atlantic to encourage them to join them at New Orleans. For example, Jean-Baptiste Semer wrote to his father in France:

My dear father ... you can come here boldly with my dear mother and all the other Acadian families. They will always be better off than in France. There are neither duties nor taxes to pay and the more one works, the more one earns without doing harm to anyone.

— Jean-Baptiste Semer, 1766

The Acadians were scattered throughout the eastern seaboard. Families were split and boarded ships with different destinations. Many ended up west of the Mississippi River in what was then French-colonized Louisiana, including territory as far north as Dakota territory. France had ceded the colony to Spain in 1762, prior to their defeat by Britain and two years before the first Acadians began settling in Louisiana. The interim French officials provided land and supplies to the new settlers. The Spanish governor, Bernardo de Gálvez, later proved to be hospitable, permitting the Acadians to continue to speak their language, practice their native religion (Roman Catholicism, which was also the official religion of Spain), and otherwise pursue their livelihoods with minimal interference. Some families and individuals did travel north through the Louisiana territory to set up homes as far north as Wisconsin. Acadians fought in the American Revolution. Although they fought for Spanish General Galvez, their contribution to the winning of the war has been recognized.

Galvez left New Orleans with an army of Spanish regulars and the Louisiana militia made up of 600 Acadian volunteers and captured the British strongholds of Fort Bute at Bayou Manchac, across from the Acadian settlement at St. Gabriel. On September 7, 1779, Galvez attacked Fort Bute and then on September 21, 1779, attacked and captured Baton Rouge.

A review of participating soldiers shows many common Acadian names among those who fought in the battles of Baton Rouge and West Florida. The Galvez Chapter of the Daughters of the American Revolution was formed in memory of those soldiers.

The Spanish colonial government settled the earliest group of Acadian exiles west of New Orleans, in what is now south-central Louisiana—an area known at the time as Attakapas, and later the center of the Acadiana region. As Brasseaux wrote, "The oldest of the pioneer communities ... Fausse Point, was established near present-day Loreauville by late June 1765." The Acadians shared the swamps, bayous, and prairies with the Attakapa and Chitimacha Native American tribes.

After the end of the American Revolutionary War, about 1,500 more Acadians arrived in New Orleans. About 3,000 Acadians had been deported to France during the Great Upheaval. In 1785, about 1,500 were authorized to emigrate to Louisiana, often to be reunited with their families, or because they could not settle in France. Living in a relatively isolated region until the early 20th century, Cajuns today are largely assimilated into the mainstream society and culture. Some Cajuns live in communities outside Louisiana. Also, some people identify themselves as Cajun culturally despite lacking Acadian ancestry.

=== Cajuns as Creoles ===
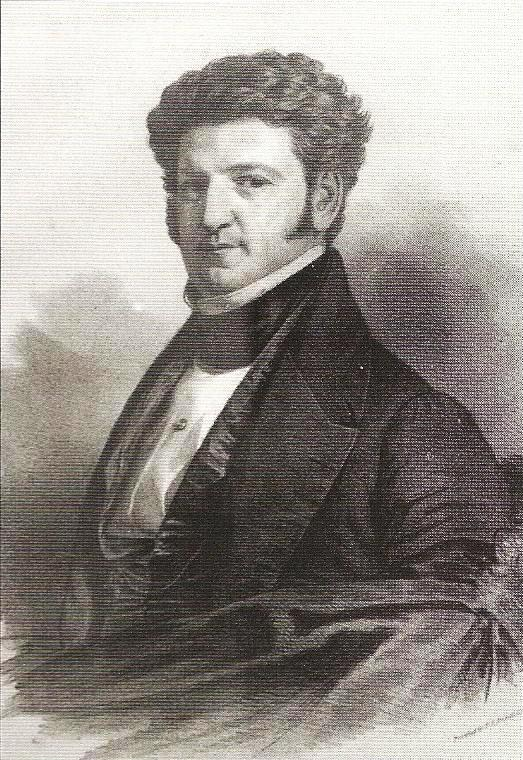
The Acadian Creole governor of Louisiana, Alexandre Mouton

In the modern era it is common to see Cajuns and Creoles discussed as separate and distinct groups; historically speaking, this was not necessarily the case. Many historical accounts exist wherein persons with Acadian surnames (and of various races) either self-identify or are described by others as Creoles.

In Louisiana, the French word Créole (itself borrowed from Spanish and Portuguese) meant "born in the New World" (compare with Spanish Criollo). This label was meant to distinguish the native-born population from newly arrived European immigrants and from slaves imported from Africa. Likewise, after the Sale of Louisiana, the term "Creole" distinguished people of Catholic, Latin backgrounds from newly arrived Americans and other Protestant anglophones.

In general, Créolité in Louisiana was largely defined by whether that person was born in Louisiana, spoke a Latin-based language (often French, Spanish or Creole) and practiced Catholicism. Having been born on Louisianian soil and maintaining a Catholic francophone identity, the Acadian descendants were indeed and often considered to be Creoles.

Documents from the late eighteenth century, such as militia rolls, make a distinction between "Acadians" (those born before or during Le Grand Dérangement) and "Creoles" (those born after Le Grand Dérangement), often the children of the former group, with identical surnames and belonging to the same families. Today, members of these families—including, among many others, those with surnames such as Broussard, Hébert, and Thibodeaux—usually consider these names Cajun rather than Creole.

Sources from the 19th century sometimes make specific references to "Acadian Creoles" in particular—a term entirely absent from contemporary Louisiana. One article in vol. 56 of The Youth's Companion notes that, "The Acadian Creoles of Louisiana are a humane and charitable race—simple-minded and full of queer, superstitious notions, but an orphan thrown upon their care never suffers." The Mouton family, an influential Acadian family of the period, provides an excellent case study in this regard, with secessionist Alexandre Mouton retaining the famous nickname of "the Creole Hotspur." His son, the Confederate General Alfred Mouton, is also noted in contemporary sources as "a brave and intrepid Creole". Today, by contrast, members of the Mouton family are referred to as "Acadians" or "Cajuns" more often than as "Creoles".

In 1885, the New Iberia Enterprise (taken from a section of advice for American editors) wrote: "Although all men born here, of whatever color and using whatever language, are Americans, it is the custom to designate the descendants of the old French, Spanish, and Acadian settlers of the country and using as a rule the French language, Creoles, and all using the English tongue, Americans."

In his Refutation des érreurs de M. George W. Cable sur le sujet des Créoles, published in L'Athénée Louisianais, the francophone Creole John L. Peytavin accused the writer George Washington Cable of fundamentally misrepresenting Creoles to the American public. (Cable, who was not a Creole and did not speak French, had written that Cajuns of Acadian descent were not themselves Creoles.) Peytavin declared: "The Acadian Creoles have the same right to be called Creoles as others of foreign descent."

=== Ethnic mixing and non-Acadian origins ===
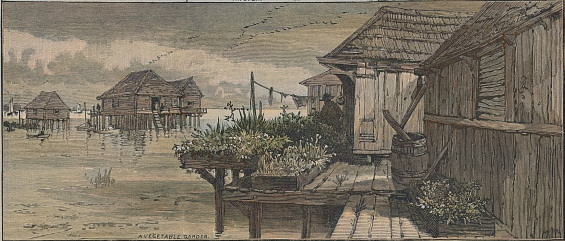
Filipino Cajuns of Saint Malo, Louisiana.

Cajuns do not descend solely from Acadian exiles who settled in south Louisiana in the 18th century. Cajuns include people with Irish and Spanish ancestry, and to a lesser extent of Germans and Italians; Many also have Native American, African and Afro-Latin Creole admixture. Historian Carl A. Brasseaux asserted that this process of mixing created the Cajuns in the first place.

Non-Acadian French Creoles in rural areas were absorbed into Cajun communities. Some Cajun parishes, such as Evangeline and Avoyelles, possess relatively few inhabitants of actual Acadian origin. Their populations descend in many cases from settlers who migrated to the region from Quebec, Mobile, or directly from France (French emigration). Regardless, Acadian influences are generally acknowledged to have prevailed in most sections of south Louisiana.

Many Cajuns have ancestors who were not French. Some of the original settlers in Louisiana were Spanish Basques and Spanish Canary Islanders. A later migration included Irish and German immigrants who began to settle in Louisiana before and after the Louisiana Purchase, particularly on the German Coast along the Mississippi River north of New Orleans. People of Latin American origin; a number of early Filipino settlers (notably in Saint Malo, Louisiana) who were known as "Manilamen" from the annual cross-Pacific Galleon or Manila Galleon trade with neighboring Acapulco, Mexico; descendants of African slaves; and some Cuban Americans have also settled along the Gulf Coast, and in some cases, intermarried into Cajun families.

One obvious result of this cultural mixture is the variety of surnames common among the Cajun population. Surnames of the original Acadian settlers (which are documented) have been augmented by French and non-French family names that have become part of Cajun communities. The spelling of many family names has changed over time. (See, for example, Eaux).

=== Indian and Afro-Cajuns ===
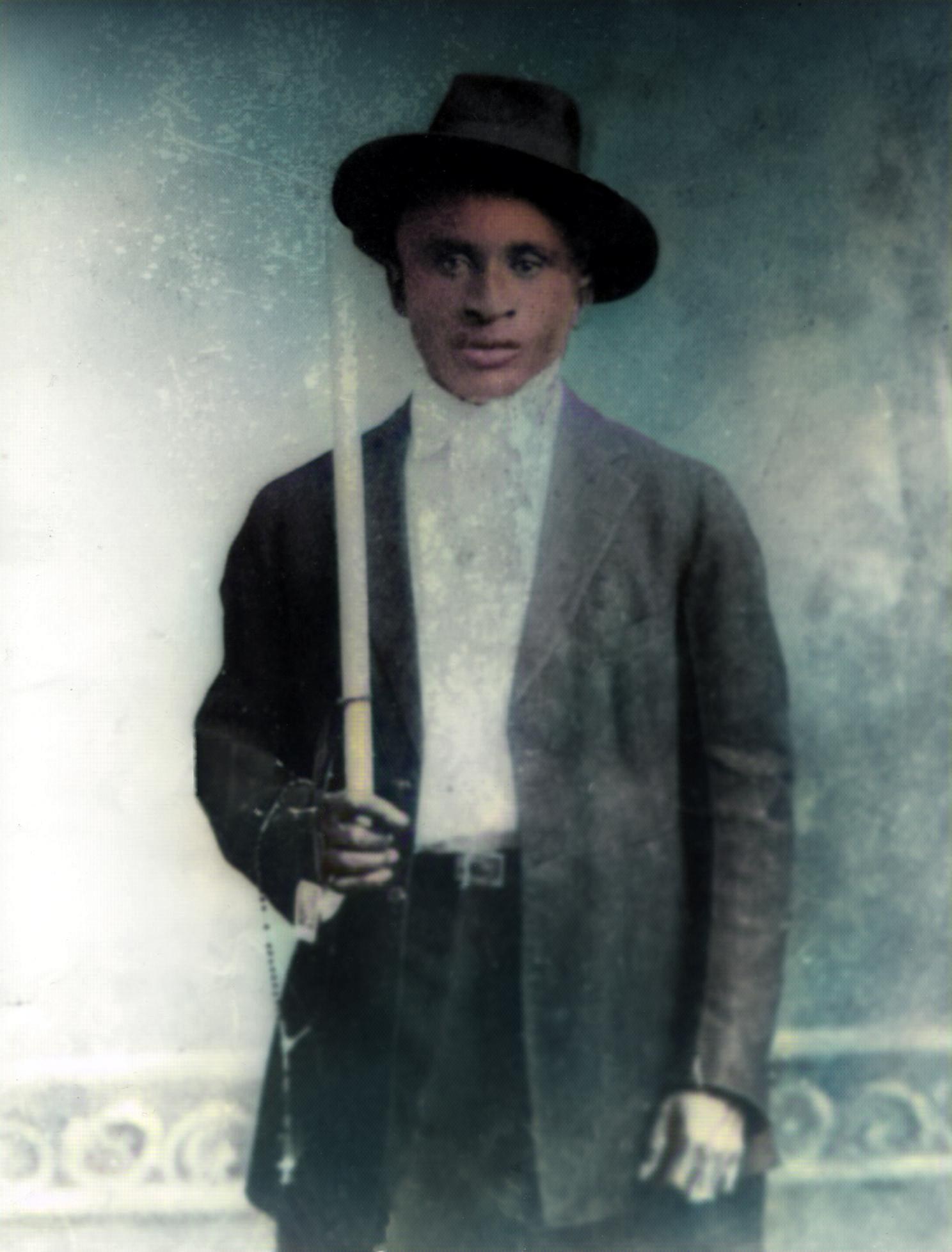
Amédé Ardoin, the first Black Cajun recording artist; he only spoke Cajun French.

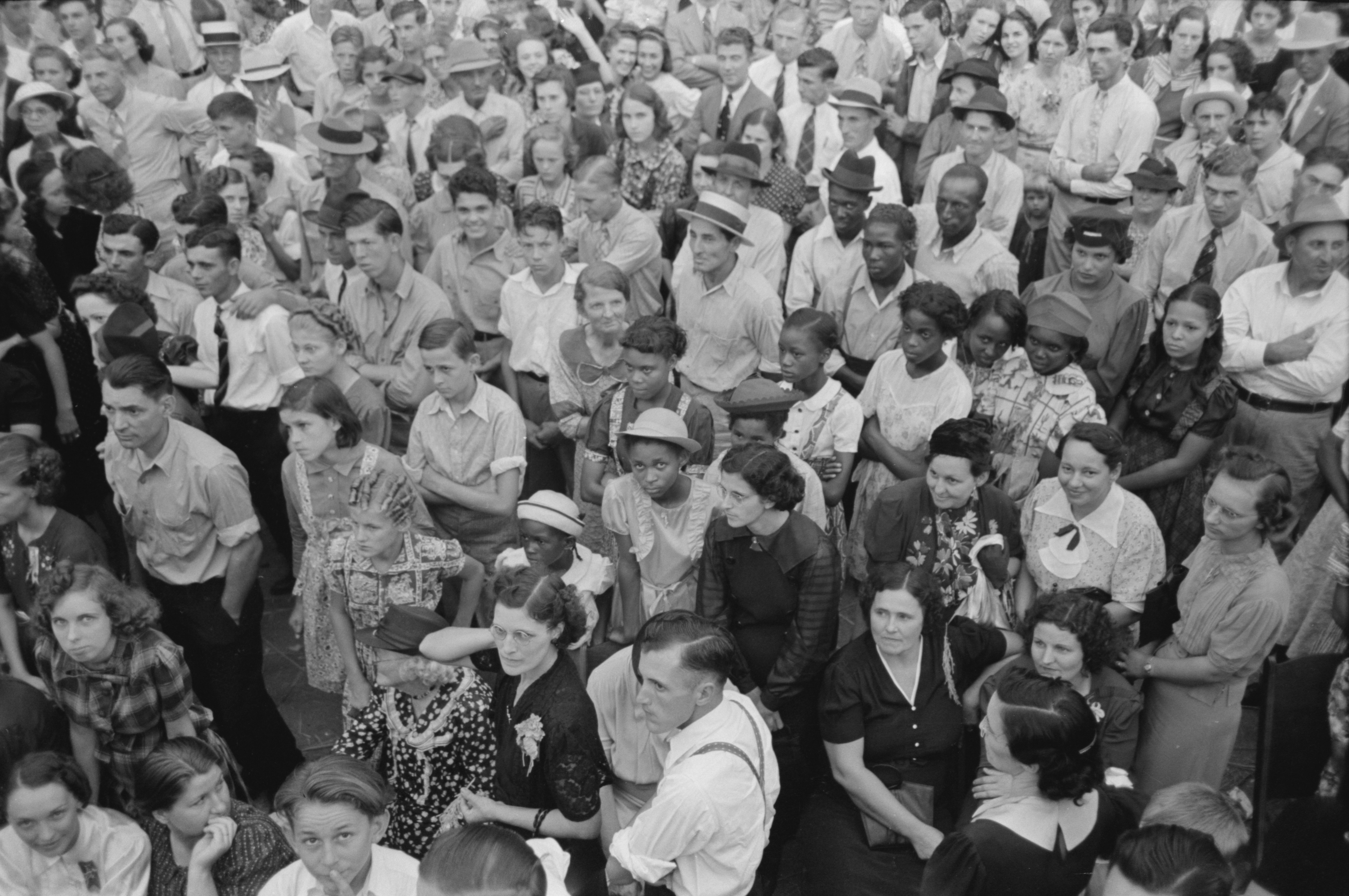
The Cajun-Creole population of Crowley enjoying a Cajun Music Concert in 1938.

Cajuns as an ethnic group historically included Indians and Blacks. Black Louisiana Frenchmen have historically self-identified as Cajun, using the term in regards to the ethnicity of Acadiana and the language they speak: Amédé Ardoin for example spoke only Cajun French and at his height was known as the first Black Cajun recording artist; Clifton Chenier the King of Zydeco, routinely self-identified as a Black Cajun:

"Bonjour, comment ça va monsieur?" Clifton Chenier greeted his cheering crowd at the 1975 Montreux Jazz Festival. "They call me the Black Cajun Frenchman."

People of Acadiana have historically described what the Cajun nationality means to them; Brandon Moreau, a Cajun of Basile, Louisiana, described Cajun as an "inclusive term designating region, descent, or heritage – not race." Moreau also described an incident of where he used the term coonass with a good friend of his: "We were all talking in the hall, and I said I was a coonass. She said she was Cajun, but that she would never be a coonass. She's black and it offended her."

Cajun culture due to its mixed Latin-Creole nature had fostered more laissez-faire attitudes between blacks and whites in Acadiana more than anywhere else in the South. Roman Catholicism actively preached tolerance and condemned all types of discrimination; the Roman Church threatened to excommunicate any of its members who would dare to break its laws.

Anglo-Americans openly discriminated against Cajuns because they were Catholics, had a Latin Culture, and spoke Cajun French. White Cajuns and White Creoles accepted advances in racial equality, and they had sympathy for Black Cajuns, Black Creoles, and African Americans. In the 1950s, twice as many blacks in Louisiana's French-Catholic parishes registered to vote compared to blacks in the Anglo-Protestant parishes.

=== Americanization of Acadiana (1950–1970) ===
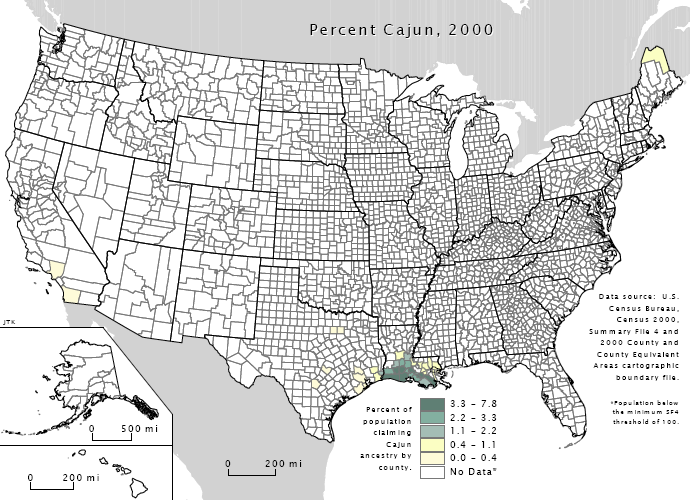
Map depicting Cajuns in the United States, according to the 2000 census.

When the United States of America began assimilating and Americanizing the parishes of Acadiana between the 1950s and 1970s, they imposed segregation and reorganized the inhabitants of the Cajun Country to identify racially as either "white" Cajuns or "black" Creoles. As the younger generations were made to abandon speaking French and French customs, the White or Indian Cajuns assimilated into the Anglo-American host culture, and the Black Cajuns assimilated into the African American culture.

Cajuns looked to the civil rights movement and other Black liberation and empowerment movements as a guide to fostering Louisiana's French cultural renaissance. A Cajun student protester in 1968 declared "We're slaves to a system. Throw away the shackles... and be free with your brother."

== Establishment of CODOFIL and preservation efforts ==
During the early part of the 20th century, attempts were made to suppress Cajun culture by measures such as forbidding the use of the Cajun French language in schools. After the Compulsory Education Act forced Cajun children to attend formal schools, English-speaking teachers threatened, punished, and sometimes beat their Cajun students in an attempt to force them to use English (a language to which many of them had not been exposed before). During World War II, Cajuns often served as French interpreters for American forces in France; this helped to overcome prejudice.

In 1968, the organization of Council for the Development of French in Louisiana was founded to preserve the French language in Louisiana—not merely among Cajuns but all French-speaking Louisianians. Besides advocating for their legal rights, Cajuns also recovered ethnic pride and appreciation for their ancestry. Since the mid-1950s, relations between the Cajuns of the US Gulf Coast and Acadians in the Maritimes and New England have been renewed, forming an Acadian identity common to Louisiana, New England, New Brunswick, and Nova Scotia.

State Senator Dudley LeBlanc ("Coozan Dud", a Cajun slang nickname for "Cousin Dudley") took a group of Cajuns to Nova Scotia in 1955 for the commemoration of the 200th anniversary of the expulsion. The Congrès Mondial Acadien, a large gathering of Acadians and Cajuns held every five years since 1994, is another example of continued unity.

Sociologists Jacques Henry and Carl L. Bankston III have maintained that the preservation of Cajun ethnic identity is a result of the social class of Cajuns. During the 18th and 19th centuries, "Cajuns" came to be identified as the French-speaking rural people of Southwestern Louisiana. Over the course of the 20th century, the descendants of these rural people became the working class of their region. This change in the social and economic circumstances of families in Southwestern Louisiana created nostalgia for an idealized version of the past. Henry and Bankston point out that "Cajun", which was formerly considered an insulting term, became a term of pride among Louisianans by the beginning of the 21st century. It is common for persons living in the historically Cajun area of Louisiana to self-identify as Cajuns even when they have limited or no Cajun ancestry.

== Edwin W. Edwards, Constitution of 1974 ==
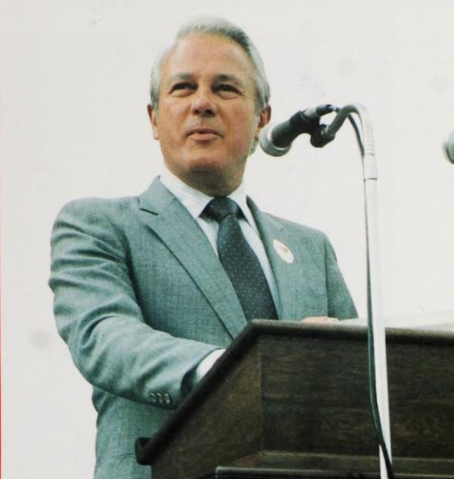
Louisiana's Cajun governor, Edwin Edwards.

Perhaps the greatest proponent and catalyst for reclaiming Cajun and French history of Louisiana is four-term former Louisiana Governor Edwin Edwards. Selected to serve as honorary chair of the Eighteenth Century Louisiana panel of the 2014 academic Enlightenment Conference in Montréal, the former Governor in a video address said, "One of the legacies of which I am most proud is Louisiana's 1974 Constitution and its provision that the 'right of the people to preserve, foster, and promote their respective historic linguistic and cultural origins is recognized'."

As the late LSU Law Center professor Lee Hargrave wrote, in reference to the protection of cultural heritage, "Proponents of the section were primarily Francophones concerned with the protection of the French Acadian culture. Representatives of the Council for the Development of French in Louisiana appeared before the committee several times to urge some recognition of cultural rights, and delegates from Lafayette and Lake Charles worked strongly for the proposal."

Montréal panelist and New Orleans Créole historian Jari Honora explained that Edwards "is a perfect commentator for this panel given his advocacy for Louisiana's Francophone cultural communities during his four terms as governor. After several decades of 'Americanization' and suppression of French language and culture in Louisiana, Governor Edwards' conscious self-identification as an Acadian descendant marked a high-point for the Cajun/Creole cultural renaissance in this state."

== Culture ==
The 22 parishes of Acadiana: The Cajun heartland of Louisiana is highlighted in darker red.

=== Geography ===
Geography had a strong correlation to Cajun lifestyles. Most Cajuns resided in Acadiana, where their descendants are still predominant.

Cajun populations today are found also in the area southwest of New Orleans and scattered in areas adjacent to the French Louisiana region, such as to the north in Alexandria, Louisiana. Strong Cajun roots, influence, and culture can also be found in parts of Southern Mississippi. These areas include Bay St. Louis, Pass Christian, Gulfport, Gautier, Natchez, D'Iberville, and Biloxi, Mississippi. Over the years, many Cajuns and Creoles also migrated to the Houston, Beaumont and Port Arthur areas of Southeast Texas, in especially large numbers as they followed oil-related jobs in the 1970s and 1980s, when oil companies moved jobs from Louisiana to Texas.

Cajun musicians in Louisiana, 1938

Many Cajuns and Creoles of color also moved to Southern California. However, the city of Lafayette is referred to as "The Heart of Acadiana" because of its location, and it is a major center of Cajun culture. Despite the migration and influence in other states, cities outside of Louisiana, including these Texas cities, are not considered a part of Acadiana and are not considered a part of "Cajun Country."

=== Music ===
Cajun music is evolved from its roots in the music of the French-speaking Catholics of Canada. In earlier years, the fiddle was the predominant instrument, but gradually the accordion has come to share the limelight. Cajun music gained national attention in 2007, when the Grammy Award for Best Zydeco or Cajun Music Album category was created.

=== Cuisine ===
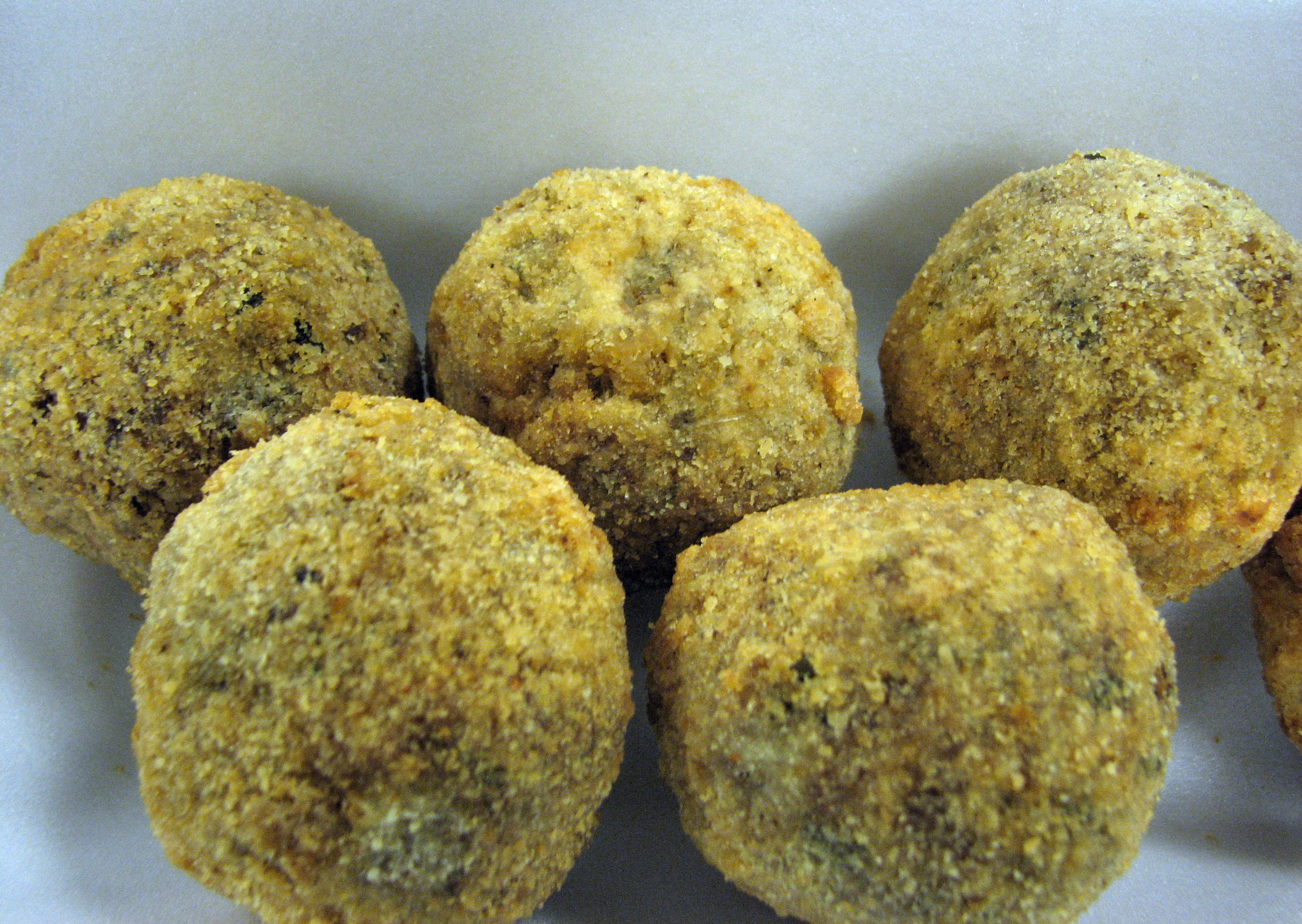
Cajun boudin rolled into a ball and deep fried

Due to Le Grand Dérangement, many Acadians were invited to settle in Louisiana by the Spanish Governor Galvez. Unfamiliar with the terrain, they assimilated Creole and Native American influences into their Acadian traditions. Cajun cuisine focused on local ingredients and wild game (e.g., duck, rabbit), vegetables (e.g., okra, mirlitons), and grains. Coastal communities relied heavily on fish and shellfish. Seafood, especially shellfish, is still very popular in the region and remains a dominant feature of many classic Cajun dishes like seafood gumbo and court-bouillon.

Since many Cajuns were farmers and not especially wealthy, they were known for not wasting any part of a butchered animal. Many rural communities held a weekly boucherie, which is a communal butchering of an animal, often a pig. Each family received a share of the meat. Some high-profile foods like grattons and boudin are examples of Cajun cuisine that are widely popular.

=== Language ===
Louisiana French is a variety or dialect of the French language spoken primarily in Louisiana. At one time as many as seven dialects were spread across the Cajun heartland.

While Cajuns are often said to speak "Cajun French," this term is increasingly seen as a misnomer because the dialect did not originate with the Acadians, and Acadian-descended people are not the only ones to speak it. Recent linguistic scholarship has also cast doubt on how much Acadian influence is present in Louisianian dialects today, and the influences that do exist are sometimes regional rather than widespread. For these reasons, the term "Louisiana French" is increasingly preferred.

Recent documentation has been made of Cajun English, an often non-rhotic French-influenced dialect of English spoken by Cajuns, either as a second language, in the case of the older members of the community, or as a first language by younger Cajuns.

=== Religious traditions ===
"Our Lady of the Assumption" is Patroness of the Acadians (Cajuns). In 1638, the colonies of France, to include Acadie, and France were consecrated by the Pope and the King to Mary under the aforementioned title; the date of consecration was August 15 which is the Solemnity of the Assumption of the Blessed Virgin Mary and is a Holy Day of Obligation for Roman Catholics (Source 4).

Traditional Catholic religious observances such as Mardi Gras, Lent, and Holy Week are integral to many Cajun communities. Likewise, these traditional Catholic religious observances may further be understood from Cultural Catholicism in Cajun-Creole Louisiana by Marcia Gaudet which tells that such traditional religious observances, although they may not be "strictly theological and liturgical forms", are still integral and necessary to many and remain religiously valid as "unofficial religious customs and traditions are certainly a part of Roman Catholicism as it is practiced".

==== Mardi Gras ====
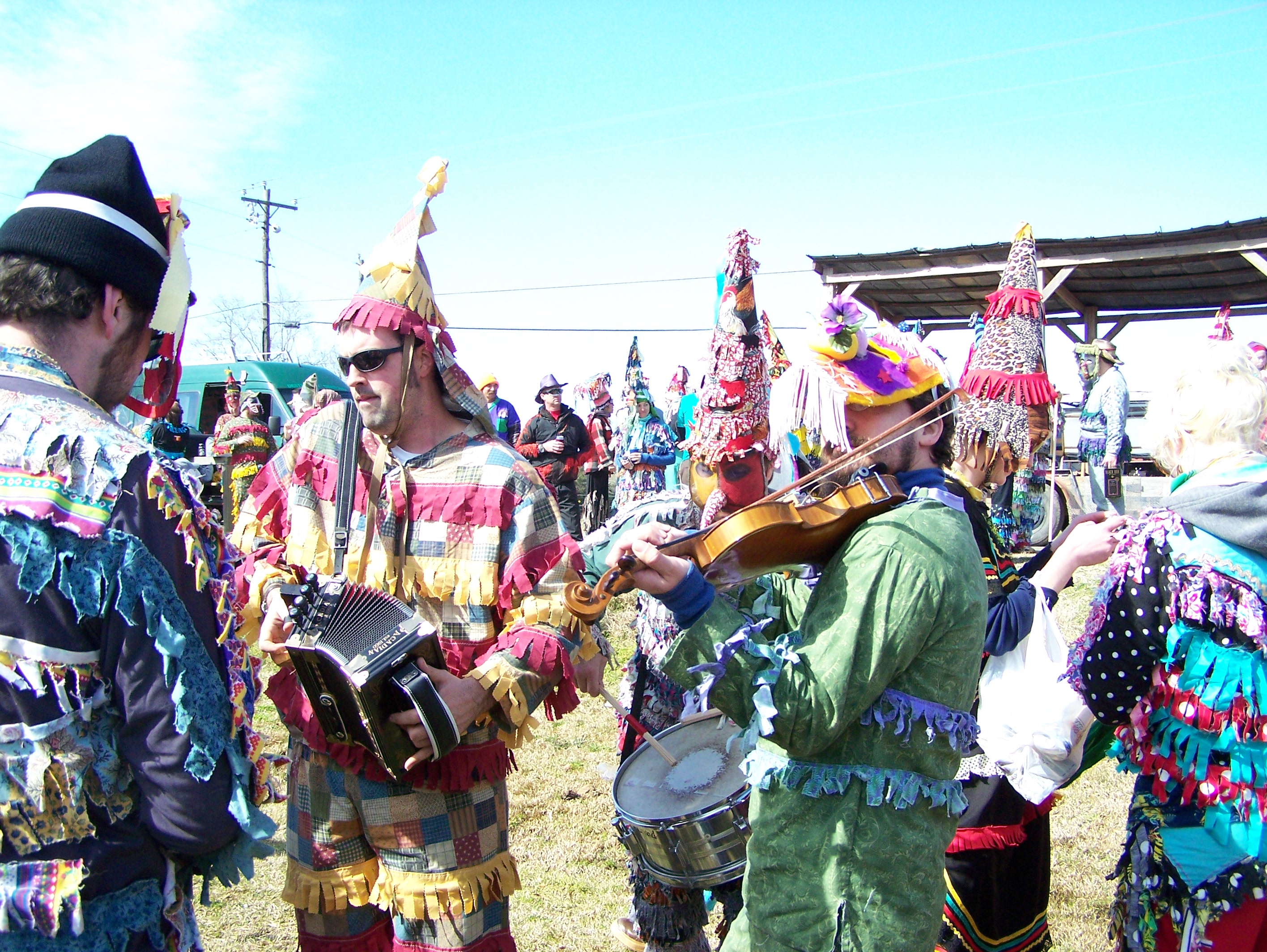
Musicians playing at a traditional Courir de Mardi Gras

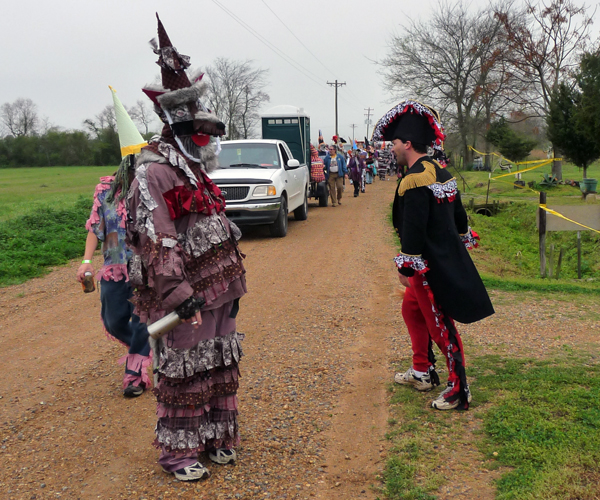
A Mardi Gras runner dressed as rougarou (left) and it's caption (right)

Mardi Gras (French for "Fat Tuesday", also known as Shrove Tuesday) is the day before Ash Wednesday, which marks the beginning of Lent, a 40-day period of fasting and reflection in preparation for Easter Sunday. Mardi Gras was historically a time to use up the foods that were not to be used during Lent, including fat, eggs, and meat.

Mardi Gras celebrations in rural Acadiana are distinct from the more widely known celebrations in New Orleans and other metropolitan areas. A distinct feature of the Cajun celebration centers on the Courir de Mardi Gras (translated: fat Tuesday run). A group of men, usually on horseback and wearing capuchons (a cone-shaped ceremonial hat) and traditional costumes, approach a farmhouse and ask for something for the community gumbo pot. Often, the farmer or his wife allows the riders to have a chicken, if they can catch it. The group then puts on a show, comically attempting to catch the chicken set out in a large open area. Songs are sung, jokes are told, and skits are acted out. When the chicken is caught, it is added to the pot at the end of the day. The courir held in the small town of Mamou and Church Point has become well known. This tradition has much in common with the observance of La Chandeleur, or Candlemas (February 2), by Acadians in Nova Scotia.

==== Easter ====
On Pâques (French for Easter), a game called pâquer, or pâque-pâque was played. Contestants selected hard-boiled eggs, paired off, and tapped the eggs together – the player whose egg did not crack was declared the winner. This is an old European tradition that has survived in Acadia. Easter is still celebrated by Cajuns with the traditional game of paque, but is now also celebrated in the same fashion as Christians throughout the United States with candy-filled baskets, Easter Bunny stories, dyed eggs, and Easter egg hunts.

=== Folk beliefs ===
One folk custom is belief in a traiteur, or healer, whose primary method of treatment involves the laying on of hands and of prayers. An important part of this folk religion, the traiteur combines Catholic prayer and medicinal remedies to treat a variety of ailments, including earaches, toothaches, warts, tumors, angina, and bleeding. Another is in the rougarou, a version of a loup garou (French for werewolf), that will hunt down and kill Catholics who do not follow the rules of Lent. In some communities, the loup garou of legend has taken on an almost protective role. Children are warned that loups garous can read souls, and that they only hunt and kill evil men and women and misbehaved horses. The folkloric creature letiche is said to be the soul of an unbaptized infant or child raised by alligators that haunts the bayous.

=== Celebrations and gatherings ===
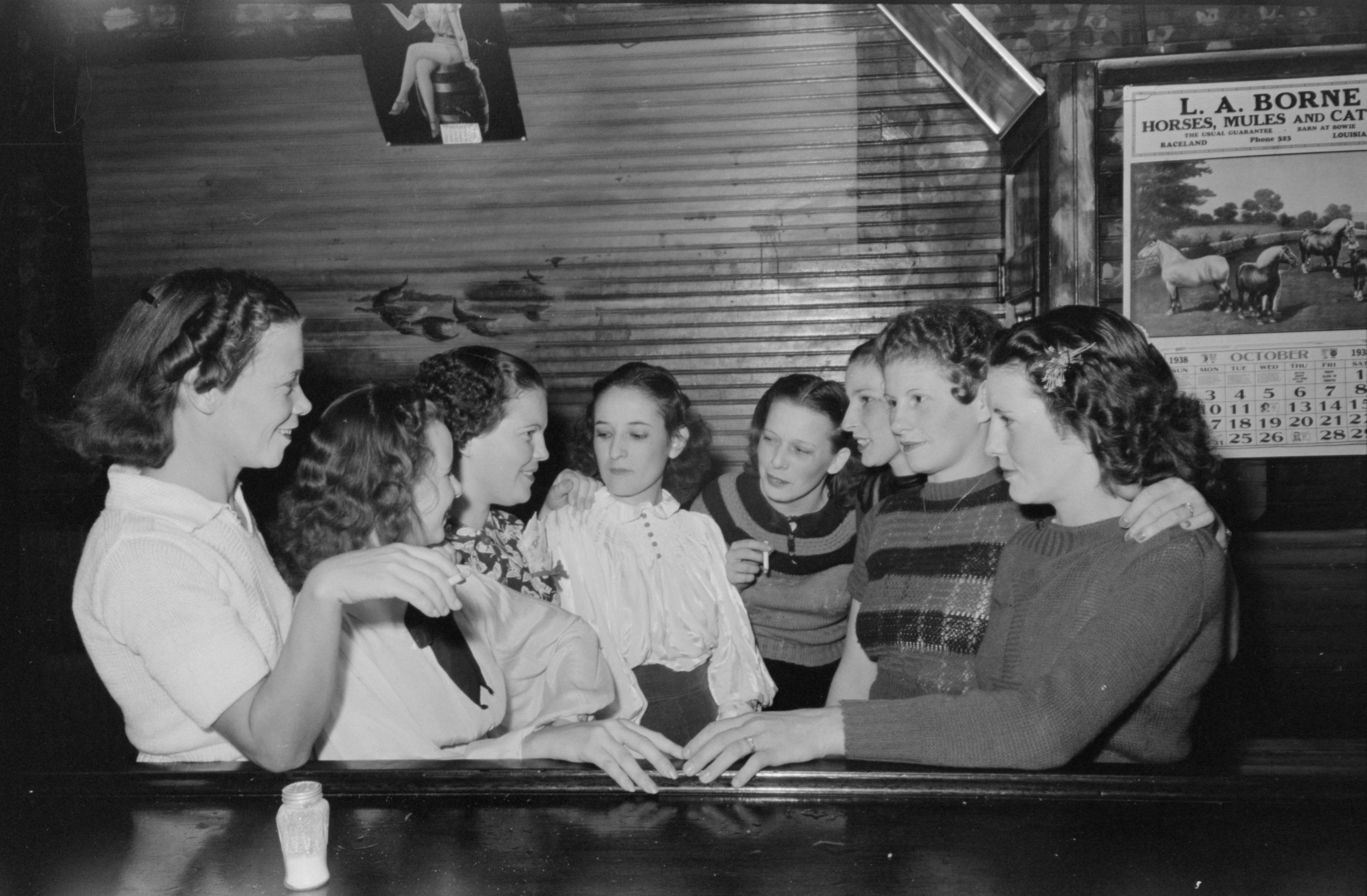
Eight young Cajun women standing at a bar in Raceland, Louisiana, October 1938

Cajuns, along with other Cajun Country residents, have a reputation for a joie de vivre (French for "joy of living"), in which hard work is appreciated as much as "let the good times roll / laissez les bon temps rouler".

==== Community gatherings ====
In the culture, a coup de main (French for "to give a hand") is an occasion when the community gathers to assist one of their members with time-consuming or arduous tasks. Examples might include a barn raising, harvests, or assistance for the elderly or sick.

==== Festivals ====
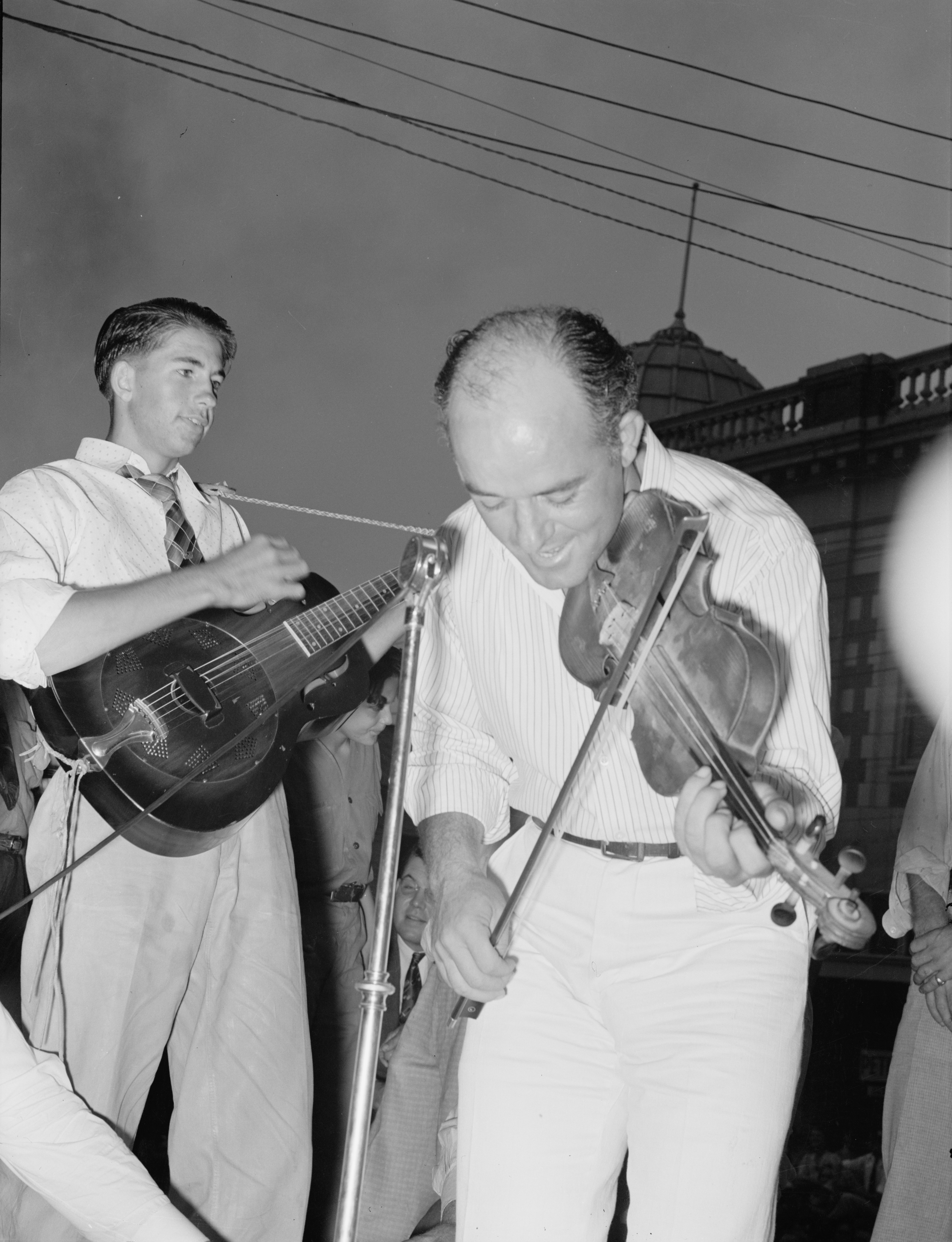
Cajun fiddler at 1938 National Rice Festival, photographed by Russell Lee

The majority of Cajun festivals include a fais do-do ("go to sleep" in French, originating from encouraging children to fall asleep in the rafters of the dance hall as the parents danced late into the night) or street dance, usually to a live local band. Crowds at these festivals can range from a few hundred to more than 100,000.

==== Other festivals outside Louisiana ====
- In Texas, the Winnie Rice Festival and other celebrations often highlight the Cajun influence in Southeast Texas.
- The Cajun Heritage Fest in Port Arthur, Texas celebrates Cajun music and cuisine and features events such as a crawfish eating contest and crawfish racing.
- Major Cajun/Zydeco festivals are held annually in Rhode Island, which does not have a sizable Cajun population, but is home to many Franco-Americans of Québécois and Acadian descent. It features Cajun culture and food, as well as authentic Louisiana musical acts both famous and unknown, drawing attendance not only from the strong Cajun/Zydeco music scene in Rhode Island, Connecticut, New York City, and California, but also from all over the world. In recent years, the festival became so popular, now several such large summer festivals are held near the Connecticut–Rhode Island border: The Great Connecticut Cajun and Zydeco Music & Arts Festival, The Blast From The Bayou Cajun and Zydeco Festival, also in California the Cajun/Zydeco Festival; Bay Area Ardenwood Historic Farm, Fremont, Calif. and The Simi Valley Cajun and Blues Music Festival.

== In media ==
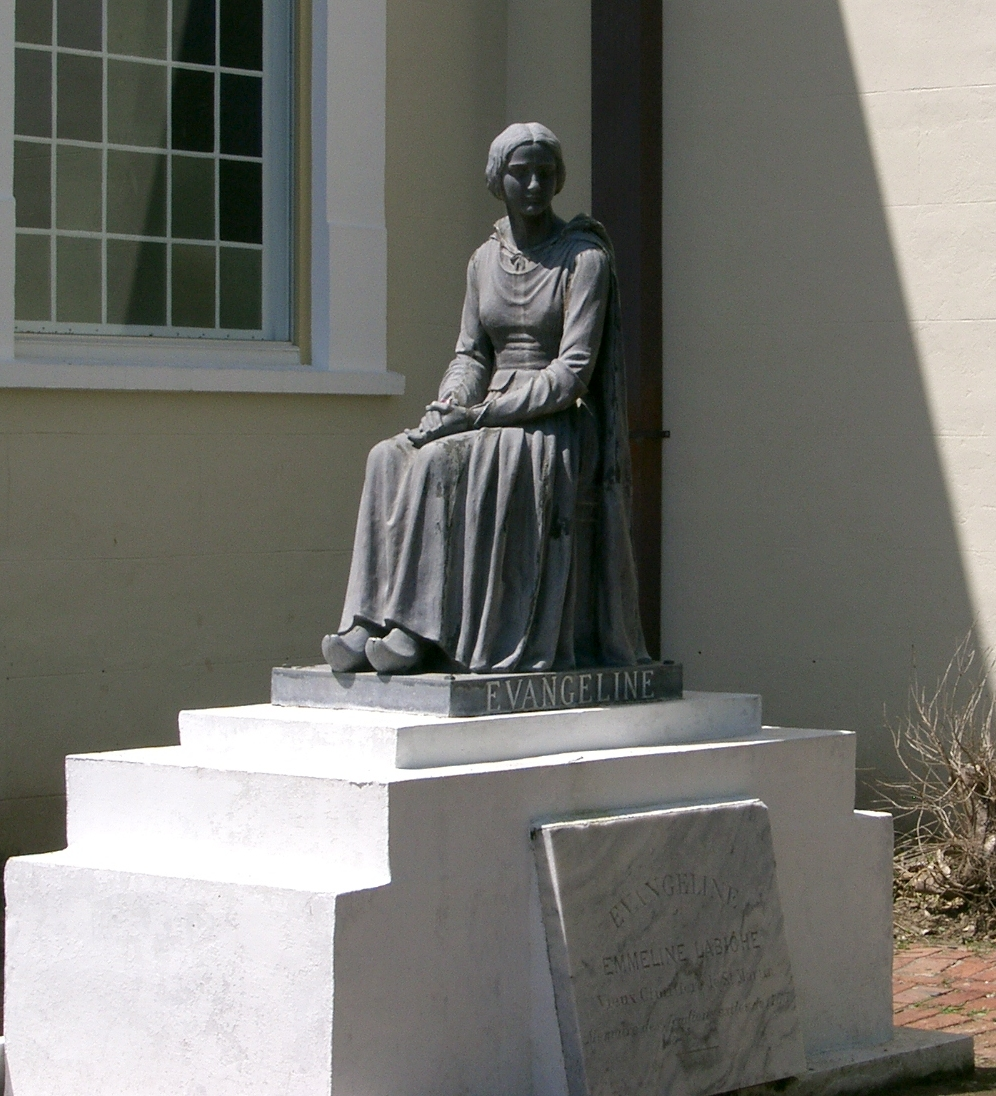
A statue of Evangeline—fictional heroine of the poem Evangeline by Longfellow—at St. Martinville, Louisiana. The statue was donated by actress Dolores del Río, who also posed for it. In a 1929 silent film by director Edwin Carewe, del Rio portrayed Evangeline.

=== Documentary films ===
- Zachary Richard, Cajun Heart (2016, color) director: Phil Comeau with Zachary Richard
- Spend It All (1971, color) director: Les Blank with Skip Gerson
- The Good Times Are Killing Me (1975, color)
- Hot Pepper (1975, color) director: Les Blank
- J'ai été au bal (English: I Went to the Dance), by Les Blank, Chris Strachwitz & Maureen Gosling; narrated by Barry Jean Ancelet and Michael Doucet (Brazos Films). Louisiana French and Zydeco music documentary.
- Louisiana Story (1948, black and white) director: Robert Flaherty. Further addressed in 2006 documentary Revisiting Flaherty's Louisiana Story, by a group at Louisiana State University.

=== Film ===
- Southern Comfort (1981), directed by Walter Hill, starring Powers Boothe
- Avenging Force (1986), directed by Sam Firstenberg, starring Michael Dudikoff
- The Big Easy (1986), directed by Jim McBride, starring Dennis Quaid
- Belizaire the Cajun (1986), directed by Glen Pitre, starring Armand Assante
- Passion Fish (1992), directed by John Sayles, starring Mary McDonnell
- Little Chenier (2006), directed by Bethany Ashton, starring Johnathon Schaech
- The Curious Case of Benjamin Button (2008), directed by David Fincher, starring Brad Pitt
- In the Electric Mist (2009), directed by Bertrand Tavernier, starring Tommy Lee Jones
- The Princess and the Frog (2009), the Disney version

=== Literature ===
- Evangeline (1847), an epic poem by Henry Wadsworth Longfellow, is loosely based on the events surrounding the 1755 deportation. It became an American classic and contributed to a rebirth of Acadian identity in both Maritime Canada and in Louisiana.
- Bayou Folk (1894) by Kate Chopin, who wrote about the Creoles and Cajuns (Acadiens)
- Several volumes on Cajun culture and history by children's book author Mary Alice Fontenot
- Acadian Waltz (2013) by Alexandrea Weis, who wrote about the Cajun culture
- Acadie, Then and Now (2014) by Warren Perrin, Mary Perrin, Phil Comeau, a collection of 65 articles on Cajun/Acadian culture and history

=== Songs ===
- "Jambalaya (On the Bayou)" (1952) is credited to Hank Williams, about life, parties, and stereotypical Cajun cuisine. The music is taken from the Cajun song "Grand Texas".
- "Acadian Driftwood" (1975), a popular song based on the Acadian Expulsion by Robbie Robertson, appeared on The Band's album Northern Lights – Southern Cross.
- "Louisiana Man" (1961), an autobiographical song written and performed by Doug Kershaw, became the first song broadcast back to Earth from the Moon by the astronauts of Apollo 12. Over the years, the song has been recorded by hundreds of artists, sold millions of copies and become a standard of modern Cajun music.
- "Mississippi Queen" is a 1970 song by Mountain about a Cajun woman visiting from Mississippi.
- "Elvis Presley Was a Cajun" is a song from the 1991 Irish film The Commitments, in which a two-piece band plays along to the lyric "Elvis was a Cajun, he had a Cajun heart."
- "Amos Moses" (1970), a song by Jerry Reed, is about a fictional one-armed alligator-hunting Cajun man.
- "Perfect Day", a song by Lady Antebellum, starts off with the singer seeing "a Cajun man with a red guitar singing on the side of the street" and throwing "a handful of change in his beat-up case and [saying] play me a country beat".
- "Cajun Hell", a song by American thrash metal band Exodus, from 1989 album Fabulous Disaster.
- "Queen Of New Orleans", a song by Jon Bon Jovi from the 1997 album Destination Anywhere
- "Adalida" by George Strait is a song about a "pretty little Cajun queen".
- "Amadie", a song by The Pogues written by the band's early member Andrew Ranken from their 1996 album Pogue Mahone which is a tribute to American musician Amadie Adouin aka Amédé Ardoin who popularized both Creole music and Cajun music in the early 20th century.
- "Marie Laveau" (1974), a song written by Shel Silverstein and sung by Bobby Bare. It is a fictitious country ballad about the historic witch doctor Marie Laveau.

== See also ==
- Boudreaux and Thibodeaux, traditional Cajun jokes
- Cajun cuisine
- Cajun music
- Cajun Navy, ad-hoc volunteer flood rescue organization
- Expulsion of the Acadians
- Acadians
- French Americans
- French Canadians
- French language in the United States
- Louisiana Creole people
- University of Louisiana at Lafayette, athletic program Ragin' Cajuns
- Acadian architecture
