= Ava Vitali =

Fictional character

- Days of Our Lives character
- Tamara Braun as Ava Vitali
- Portrayed by: Tamara Braun (2008–2016, 2020–2025); Sara Fletcher (2017); Linsey Godfrey (2022)
- Duration: 2008; 2015–2017; 2020–2025
- First appearance: February 8, 2008
- Last appearance: April 3, 2025
- Introduced by: Ken Corday and Edward J. Scott (2008); Ken Corday, Albert Alarr and Greg Meng (2015); Ken Corday and Albert Alarr (2020)
In-universe information
- Other names: Angela Van de Kamp; Sarah Horton
- Occupation: Mob heiress; Businesswoman
- Parents: Martino Vitali
- Sons: Charlie Dale; Tripp Dalton
- Grandchildren: Henry Horton
- First cousins: Angelo Vitali; Eddie

Ava Vitali is a fictional character from Days of Our Lives, an American soap opera. Created by and introduced by then-executive producers Ken Corday and Edward J. Scott, the role is portrayed by Tamara Braun, who won a Daytime Emmy Award for the role in 2009. Introduced as a "mysterious woman from Steve's past," Ava was later revealed as a woman from a Mafia family. Ava appeared for six months in 2008, and returned in December 2015 for a three-month guest appearance. Following a brief voice appearance in 2017, Ava returned to the show on a regular basis in November 2020, and exited again when Ava left town in April 2025.

== Casting ==
"I identified with all of them on a human level. I must find a common human thread with all the characters I play; otherwise, I fear I would be playing a caricature. Carly and Ava were the most dynamic and colorful. Reese was the most normal, yet she had the most historic impact."

— Braun on which of her daytime roles she most identified with.

In January 2008, it was announced that Tamara Braun, best known as the second actress to portray the character of Carly Corinthos on the ABC Daytime drama, General Hospital, had been cast on Days of Our Lives. The casting of Braun originally brought up fan speculation that she would be coming in as previous established character, Sarah Horton, daughter of veteran character, Maggie Horton. This speculation was quickly put to rest when it was announced that Braun would join as Ava. Braun originally aired for 6 months from February 8 to August 4, 2008. Following the completion of her run as Ava, it was announced in September 2008 that Braun would join All My Children as Reese Williams, current girlfriend of the show's iconic Bianca Montgomery. Braun went on to win a Daytime Emmy Award for Outstanding Supporting Actress for her portrayal of Ava. Braun later returned to Days of our Lives in the role of Taylor Walker, replacing her former General Hospital co-star Natalia Livingston.

In July 2015, it was announced that Braun is reprising the role of Ava, as part of the show's fiftieth anniversary celebration, first airing on December 9. Braun departed on March 1, 2016. Actress Sara Fletcher voiced Ava for one episode that aired on April 10, 2017. On September 2, 2020, Soap Opera Digest exclusively announced that Braun would again reprise the role of Ava. She returned during the November 13, 2020, episode. On April 1, 2025, Braun announced she had wrapped filming in July of the previous year; she departed the role when Ava leaves Salem on April 3.

== Storylines ==
=== 2008 ===
Ava first appears in early February 2008, stalking Steve Johnson – a man she calls "Patch" – and the Brady family with whom he is traveling with in Ireland. Obsessed with Steve, she continues to stalk the hotel where he was residing. In an attempt to delay Steve and the rest of the Brady family's departure from Ireland, she sabotages their plane. Her plan, however, goes wrong when the plane began experiencing problems in mid-air, causing the death of Brady patriarch Shawn Brady. After following Steve back to Salem, she sees him hug Hope Williams Brady outside of Steve's apartment door. She then interrogates Hope, asking if she was in love with Steve. Scared off by Hope, Ava immediately leaves the grounds. Ava then runs into Steve, promising to exact her revenge against him and his family for leaving her without a goodbye. Looking at photos of the crash victims, she stops at Hope's, wondering who she was and why she loved her dear, "Patch".

Convinced that Hope is Steve's wife, Ava is visited by a therapist, who questions her sense of reality. Escaping from her guards, Ava kidnaps Hope, who she believes is Steve's wife Kayla Brady, and holds her hostage at the Vitali compound. Driven with rage, Ava demands Hope call Steve, who catches onto the scheme and calls Hope's husband, Bo Brady and tells him to not involve the police.

Ava then pressures Steve to have sex with her, a suggestion Steve denies doing, blaming his injuries from the plane crash. Ava, however, plans to seduce Steve in hopes of making the person she believed to be Kayla jealous. Before she can execute her plan, Bo and the real Kayla infiltrate the Vitali compound. Ava, in turn, orders her guards to kill them all. When they fail, Ava shoots Hope; Bo then goes to shoot Ava, but is protected by Steve. When questioned by a hurt Hope about why she hates Steve so much, Ava goes into detail about her "almost wedding day" of how Steve left her. Steve explains that while he had doubts about the wedding, he was abducted by Stefano DiMera's henchmen. Though shocked by the revelation, Ava becomes agitated and pops pills. Able to escape, Bo calls Abe Carver, who arrives to the Vitali compound with Roman Brady. Abe and Roman are able to calm the situation, arresting Ava. While under arrest, Kayla reveals that the pills Ava was taking, were the cause of her paranoia over Steve and the Brady family. As a result of her actions, Ava's father, Martino Vitali, shows up in Salem.

Later, Lexie Carver releases Ava into police custody. Roman then informs Ava that her bail has been paid and that she was free to go. Ava's cousin, Angelo, then reveals that it was her father Martino who had her drugged. When Martino pulls a gun out, he is shot and killed by Bo. Putting her past behind her, Ava accepts a date with John Black. When it is revealed that a warehouse shipment of John's has gone up in flames, Ava urges John, with the assistance of Philip Kiriakis to fight back. When John's estranged wife, Marlena Evans, shows up and sees him entertaining Ava, he makes it clear that they haven't been husband and wife since his accident earlier in the year, and that he was now moving on with his life with Ava. When news of a disk comes out that may contain the key to restoring John's memories, he admits to Marlena, Philip and Ava that he knew about said disk, and in a shocking decision, kisses Ava.

Moving on with their lives, Ava and John later toast to their newfound relationship. Trusting Ava, John reveals his plans concerning the recent disappearance of Paul Hollingsworth and his plans to pin the disappearance on Philip. When Ava's faced with possible charges of the plane crash earlier in the year, she hires EJ DiMera as her attorney. When EJ alerts Ava that the new judge in her trial could not be bribed, she breaks bail and makes the decision to leave the country.

=== 2015–2017, 2020–2025 ===
In December 2015, Ava manipulates Joey (James Lastovic), Steve and Kayla's underage teenage son, into "helping" her reunite his parents to orchestrate her plan of revenge. Joey is unaware of her past. Steve and Kayla discover Ava is back in Salem and assume Joey has been working with her, but he denies it. After months of Ava preying on Joey, he admits to her that he is in love with her and he kisses her but Ava rejects his advances and reveals that she is "dying" from leukemia. Kayla finds them together talking in her hotel room and demands that Joey stay away from Ava. Ava continues to manipulate Joey's romantic feelings for her and his attraction to her only grows stronger. Joey confides in Steve about his feelings for Ava and is shocked to learn about Ava's past and that she may have given birth to Steve's son. Ava knocks Kayla unconscious, causing a hematoma, and kidnaps her. Ava then coerces Steve to either have sex with her or she'll let Kayla die to which Steve agrees under duress to secure Kayla's release. She then gives Joey Kayla's location to free her. Steve is reunited with his family but Steve's "betrayal" leaves Joey angry and bitter. Learning that Ava planned on framing his mother for attempted murder (she drugged herself with morphine in Kayla's home) a drunken Joey smothers a drugged Ava in a hospital bed, with Steve willingly implicating himself in the murder.

In November 2020, Ava returns to Salem, alive and working with Philip Kiriakis (Jay Kenneth Johnson). It is revealed that Ava was revived by Wilhelm Rolf (William Utay)'s formula that brings the dead back to life. She tells Kristen DiMera (Stacy Haiduk) that she pulled herself out of the fire at the lab back in 2018. She reunites with her son, Tripp Dalton (Lucas Adams) after she catches Allie Horton (Lindsay Arnold)—who has accused him of raping her in London—holding him at gun point. Later, Kayla has Ava arrested for her kidnapping; in-exchange for dropping the charges, Ava agrees to not press attempted murder charges against Joey, allowing him to be released from prison. Ava then meets with her other son, Charlie Dale (Mike Manning), who is working as an intern for Titan Enterprises to keep an eye on Phillip and Xander Kiriakis (Paul Telfer) per his mother's instructions. When Ava discovers it was Charlie and not Tripp who raped Allie, she confronts him with the truth. Scared, Charlie confesses his crimes and knocks her unconscious. Charlie is later murdered by Jan Spears (Heather Lindell), who wants to frame her enemy, Belle Black (Martha Madison), for the crime. Ava later starts a relationship with Rafe Hernandez (Galen Gering), which his sister, Gabi Hernandez (Camila Banus), disapproves of. Rafe later cheats on Ava with his ex Nicole Walker (Arianne Zucker), and Ava subsequently receives a package from Kristen (who is hiding at a convent) containing a mask of Sarah Horton which Ava gives to Xander's girlfriend Gwen so she can manipulate him. Ava then invites Rafe and Nicole to dinner, even as Rafe suspects that Ava has framed him for planting evidence in two separate police investigations.

Later, she begins a relationship with Jake DiMera which leads him to propose to Ava, but he is shot by a robber and is killed. Gabi Hernandez convinces her to lie and say the two were married before Jake died so she would have Jake's share at DiMera Enterprises and help oust EJ as CEO. However, EJ soon caught on to the deception and, with newly resurrected Stefan DiMera, exposes Ava and Gabi's plot. He blackmails Ava to leave Salem or go to prison for fraud. She leaves but soon returns and enlists Xander's help in kidnapping EJ's mother for ransom. During this time, Ava begins hallucinating Charlie convincing her she is doing the right thing in getting revenge on EJ. The plan go wrong when Xander has a change of heart and lets Susan go. At the meet spot, Ava prepares shoot EJ for kidnapping Tripp in retaliation but Susan intervenes and is kidnapped again. Ava drives recklessly while EJ is in pursuit and, under Charlie's guidance, drives off a cliff with her and Susan in the car.

She survived and decided to plant a bomb at Susan's memorial service to kill EJ, but Tripp arrives and she tries to warn him before the bomb goes off but it's too late. Ava is among the injured and her sanity slips away when she mistakes Tripp for Charlie and attacks him. She was committed to Bayview for treatment. While there, she connects with Harris Michaels (Steve Burton). After escaping an assassination attempt by EJ, her and Ava investigate the whereabouts of Susan after Ava remembers that Susan was still alive at the accident site. The discover her being held captive in London by an old boyfriend. It's later revealed that Clyde Weston ensured Susan's capture to blackmail EJ into helping him run drugs in Salem. Ava instead became the target of blackmail and, along with Stefan DiMera, were forced to work for Clyde to protect the ones they love, going as far as pretending to be lovers and, albeit drunkenly, have sex. Eventually, Ava decides to take matters into her own hands after Clyde kidnaps Tripp and his girlfriend Wendy. She and Steve manage to save Tripp but Clyde escapes. She, along with Steve, Chad and Lucas corner Clyde and he's captured again. Her relationship with Harris ends as well after he decides to go after Megan DiMera to bring her down too.

Eventually, Ava begins a relationship with Brady Black while still managing The Bistro. However, his daughter Rachel conspires with a woman, later revealed to be Rachel Blake, to remove Ava from Brady's life. She's held captive at Blake's old home, Aremid, until she is rescued by Steve and Brady, but not before telling them that both EJ and Kristen knew she was there and did nothing to help her. She is convinced to not implicate Rachel out of fear that she'll be taken away from Brady and Kristen. She agrees, but her relationship with Brady is strained and she breaks it off. She decides to leave Salem and go to Hong Kong to be with Tripp and Wendy.

== Reception ==
Cindy McLennan from TV Series Finale criticised the character's 2015 return, writing "Despite Braun's talent, the return of Ava was nothing more than fan repellant".
