= Taylor Walker (Days of Our Lives) =

- Days of Our Lives character
- Tamara Braun as Taylor Walker
- Portrayed by: Katherine Ellis (1998–1999); Natalia Livingston (2011); Tamara Braun (2011)
- Duration: 1998–1999; 2011
- First appearance: August 6, 1998
- Last appearance: September 22, 2011
- Created by: Sally Sussman Morina
- Introduced by: Ken Corday; Tom Langan
- Natalia Livingston as Taylor Walker
In-universe information
- Other names: Taylor Raines
- Occupation: Secretary; Businesswoman; Model; Cleaner; Physical therapy student
- Parents: Paul Mendez; Fay Walker
- Siblings: Nicole Walker; Brandon Walker
- Nieces and nephews: Daniel DiMera; Holly Jonas; Jude Brady

Taylor Walker is a fictional character from the American NBC soap opera, Days of Our Lives, a long-running series about working-class life in the fictional town of Salem. She was introduced in 1998 by head writer Sally Sussman Morina, and executive producer Ken Corday by actress Katherine Ellis. The character was reintroduced in 2011, by former General Hospital actresses Natalia Livingston and Tamara Braun, the latter of whom also portrayed the character of Ava Vitali on the same show. Taylor's last appearance was on September 22, 2011.

== Casting ==
Actress Katherine Ellis originated the role from 1998 to 1999. In 2011, the character was brought back to the show, this time portrayed by former General Hospital actress Natalia Livingston, best known for her role as Emily Quartermaine. However, after only three weeks of airing, the show announced the role of Taylor would be recast with Tamara Braun, who worked with Livingston on General Hospital when she appeared as Carly Corinthos. Braun also previously appeared on Days of our Lives as Ava Vitali. Days of our Lives co-executive producer Greg Meng stated, "It was decided to take the character of Taylor in a new direction. Natalia Livingston is an amazing actress and a consummate professional. She is a class act and everyone at the studio adores her." Executive producer Ken Corday issued a statement in Soap Opera Digest, stating:

"It's difficult for Taylor to leave [sic] There is some magnet pulling her back to stay in Salem. Taylor helps people who are suffering [sic] She has a real need to save people. If everybody is telling you something about a person, maybe you should listen. But in Taylor's mind, she wants to save EJ and show his redeemable qualities." Meanwhile, Braun hopes that viewers will continue to stay interested in Taylor and EJ's story. "It's going to be really interesting"

— Braun on her views of Taylor.

"The storyline is going in a different direction [...] Tamara brings a different quality to the tole and that's why we made the decision. We made this choice carefully. It wasn't an arbitrary rthing and we believe it's in the best interest of the show and the character. Natalie is a wonderful actress and a lovely person, but it's the nature of the business. It's not like it's the first time for us or the first time on daytime."

Corday also confessed there was slight hesitation with the decision to cast Braun in the role, given her previous portrayal of Ava, stating:

"Sure, there's hesitation, because she's very recognizable in another role, but I knew her capabilities as an actress would far outweigh the fact that she played Ava. We did it with Josh [Taylor, Roman; ex-Chris], although that was a lot of time in between, and this was only two years. But I know the viewers get accustomed to things quickly."

In June 2011, it was announced that Braun was let go from Days of our Lives, and last aired in September 2011.

== Storylines ==
=== 1998–99 ===
The character of Taylor Raines was introduced as a cleaning girl at Titan, who struck up a friendship with Eric Brady, which caused Nicole Walker to become jealous by said conversations, causing clear tension between her and Eric. When it was revealed that Taylor and Nicole were sisters, everyone was shocked. When Lucas Horton sustained injuries from a subsequent car accident and needed physical therapy, Taylor was assigned to help with him exclusively. Kate Roberts offered Taylor a good salary with room and board at the Kiriakis Mansion if she would be Lucas' companion and physical therapist. When Taylor accepted the offer, Nicole in return, was furious at her sister.

After being absent in town, she returned to confess that she was still in love with Eric, which proved to widen the hatred between Taylor and her sister, Nicole. Lucas made Taylor his pawn in his quest to get Nicole, turning her into a model to prove to Nicole that any "new' face gets old quickly. When Taylor discovered Lucas' sinister plan, she left town for college.

=== 2011 ===
Taylor Walker returned to Salem in 2011. She arrived at the DiMera mansion and asked her estranged sister Nicole for assistance, due to being broke. Nicole, hesitant at first, decided to give her sister the chance and eventually warmed up to the idea of having Taylor live with her. After a chance run-in with Nicole's fiancé, EJ DiMera, she quickly develops strong feelings for him, not knowing about his involvement with her sister. At Nicole and EJ's wedding, Taylor learned the horrific truth that the man she had feelings for was her sister's fiancé. Despite being married to Nicole, EJ suggested that he and Taylor have an affair, something to which she denies.

To distance herself from the DiMeras, Taylor took a job in marketing at Titan, a move that EJ does not support. Taylor and Nicole's mother, Fay, returned to town in March seriously ill. To help take care of her mother, Taylor agrees to move in with Fay at the DiMera mansion. In an attempt to keep things less awkward between her and EJ, she suggests they find a way to keep things friendly between each other. After EJ witnesses a close moment between Taylor and Brady Black, he manipulates her to go see her mother. The manipulation updates Taylor, leading her to think EJ is unable to control himself.

Unable to control their feelings, Taylor and EJ eventually give into each other by kissing and professing their love for each other. Unable to deal with the guilt of her feelings, Taylor makes it clear to EJ she will not enter into an affair with EJ because of her sister. Before Taylor can successfully tell Nicole about her feelings, they discover their mother lying unconscious in the foyer of the DiMera mansion. After bringing their mother to the hospital, Taylor confesses to her mother about her feeling towards EJ. Fay briefly awakens to tell Taylor to help her sister. Fay is then murdered by a Rafe Hernandez impostor.

Following her mother's funeral service, Taylor and EJ ride back to the mansion together in a limo. Unable to fight their sexual tensions, they kiss one another following a car crash. When EJ reveals his intentions of divorcing Nicole to be with Taylor, Nicole blackmails him into keeping their marriage, revealing she knew about the impostor Rafe and how he killed her mother. Taken aback by the news, she decides to leave town, but is stopped by Lexie Carver. Knowing about her sister's deceptions, Nicole plays it nice with Taylor asking her to remain in Salem but to stay away from Brady.

After Taylor is confronted by Nicole, she is threatened to either leave town or Nicole would put EJ in jail. After agreeing to stay in town, Taylor began to investigate on her own about her mother's death. She discovers a cameo that Sami Brady has in her possession; Taylor claims the cameo has her mother's, but Sami attempts to lure Taylor into believing it's her own. Taylor later overhears a conversation concerning Rafe Hernandez where he confesses to kill her mother. Infuriated, Taylor accuses Rafe, accusations that Sami then denies. Taylor unveils her beliefs to Nicole, whom puts the pieces together about a conversation previous had with EJ concerning a brainwashed Rafe. During a confrontation between Rafe, Stefano, EJ and Robo Rafe, Taylor walks in and demands to know the truth concerning the two Rafes. Infuriated, a hurt Taylor demands to know the truth from EJ, asking if he was involved in any way with Robo Rafe and the death of her mother; EJ confesses that the claims against him by Bo and Hope Brady, Sami and Rafe are true. Unable to forgive EJ, she leaves him and breaks off their engagement.

Not knowing where to turn, Taylor seeks out Nicole and confesses everything that EJ was involved in. Expecting her sister to rub it into her face, Nicole reacts with care and compassion towards Taylor. As they reach a new understanding in their relationship, EJ arrives trying to reclaim Taylor into his life. A protective Nicole defends Taylor, to which Taylor confesses to EJ that all she wants is her mother back, something he could not give to her. Taylor later runs into an old flame, Quinn Hudson, whom she shares a checkered past with. She also accepted a desk job at the Salem Police Department, following her decision to quit Titan Industries months earlier. Taylor intends to reveal Quinn's involvement in the recent attack on female hookers, but Quinn pins it over Taylor's head that if she does, he'll make sure her reputation in Salem would be tarnished by her past deeds. When she visits the latest victim of attack, she hears Quinn's name murmured. Instead of telling Hope, she keeps it to herself, protecting herself and Quinn. Taylor is then confronted by Nicole who shows her a mugshot of Taylor; she confesses that she was arrested for protesting human rights during her days in grad school. It was later revealed that Taylor had agreed to hook for Quinn during a time when they had a brief fling; she then confesses that she tried to leave a party she was attending, but before she could exit, she was arrested for prostitution. Quinn promises to protect Taylor and her secret.

When Quinn promises Taylor that he has quick the business, he makes his commitment to her. In an attempt to make an effort, Quinn introduces Taylor to his mother Vivian Alamain. When confronted by Nicole, she reveals that Taylor was telling the truth about her arrest. Taylor turns to Quinn, who confesses that he made a call to get her record changed from prostitution to human rights protest. When she asks why he did such a thing, he professes his love to her. When Quinn is arrested for the attacks on hookers, Taylor promises to help prove his innocence. When it's revealed that Vivian's right-hand man, Gus, was responsible for the attacks, Quinn is cleared of all charges. Roman Brady suggests to Quinn and Taylor that it'd be smart for them to leave town and to get away from recent events. Along with Vivian, Quinn and Taylor finally leave Salem on September 22, 2011. In 2014, Nicole calls Taylor to tell her that EJ has died.
