= Don's Plum =

R. D. Robb film

- Film poster
- Directed by: R. D. Robb
- Written by: Bethany Ashton; Tawd Beckman; R.D. Robb; David Stutman; Dale Wheatley
- Produced by: David Stutman; Dale Wheatley
- Starring: Leonardo DiCaprio; Tobey Maguire; Kevin Connolly
- Cinematography: Steve Adcock; Brian Bellamy
- Edited by: Paul Heiman; Nabil Mehchi
- Music by: Blake Sennett
- Production companies: Trust Film Sales; Zentropa Entertainment
- Distributed by: Polo Pictures Entertainment
- Release dates: February 10, 2001 (Berlinale); August 24, 2001 (Denmark)
- Running time: 89 minutes
- Countries: United States; Denmark; Sweden
- Language: English
- Box office: €6,297

Don's Plum is a 2001 black-and-white independent drama film directed by R. D. Robb, starring Leonardo DiCaprio, Tobey Maguire and Kevin Connolly. It was filmed in 1995 and 1996, and written by Robb with Bethany Ashton, Tawd Beckman, David Stutman and Dale Wheatley. The film takes place over the course of one night in which a group of young adults discuss life while eating at a diner.

The film was blocked from release in the U.S. and Canada because DiCaprio and Maguire claimed they had agreed to star in only a short film but not a feature film. Blake Sennett of Rilo Kiley provided the soundtrack for the film. His bandmate Jenny Lewis has a role as Sara. It is the second film collaboration between Maguire and DiCaprio, the first being This Boy's Life, released in 1993, and the third being The Great Gatsby, released in 2013.

== Plot ==
A group of young men, all about 20 years old, meet at Don's Plum, a Los Angeles restaurant, every Saturday night. The group often brings new women they have met to these gatherings. Ian, a peculiar but somewhat charismatic young man, is at a jazz bar attempting to invite a woman to join him and his friends at the restaurant. After being rejected twice, he asks Juliette, a waitress he knows, to come along. Meanwhile, Amy, a young woman kicked out of a car by her boyfriend, hitchhikes and is picked up by Ian's friend Jeremy, an aspiring actor. Jeremy and another friend, Derek, meet with an acquaintance, Leon. Derek takes Leon's phone and ignores him as he unsuccessfully tries to call a girl, leaving Leon upset after Derek declines his invitation to hang out.

Another friend, Brad, who is bisexual, finishes sleeping with Sara and invites her to join the group on the condition that he pretends they have just met. At the diner, the group introduces themselves and orders food from Flo, a waitress who is dissatisfied with her job and her affair with the restaurant's owner, Don, to secure a better schedule. The group engages in various conversations, but tensions arise when Derek insults an overweight woman, upsetting Amy, while the others find it amusing. Derek and Jeremy begin to isolate and antagonize Amy, with Ian the only one to defend her. Amy leaves in a fit of anger, briefly returning to throw a bag at the group. Sara's friend Constance joins the group after spotting Sara through the window, and they continue their conversations, which include a minor argument with a man at another table.

Jeremy spots a prominent female producer for whom he once auditioned and introduces himself. She drunkenly flirts with him and suggests a meeting the next day for a sexual encounter. As the group watches a woman slap her boyfriend during an argument, Derek becomes particularly silent. Jeremy presses him for details, leading Derek to reveal his discomfort rooted in his father's suicide, which he attributes to his mother's abuse. Derek retreats to the bar, followed by Sara, who empathizes with him due to her own familial struggles. The two begin to kiss at the bar, but Sara eventually pulls away, which briefly upsets Derek. He apologizes and asks to be left alone, but Sara becomes aggressive, leading to an argument that ends with Sara breaking down in the bathroom over her personal failures.

Ian and Jeremy argue over Derek's trauma, and it escalates into a physical fight. Derek arrives and breaks it up. The group leaves the diner, walking down the street in high spirits, excited about another night at Don's Plum. Amy vandalizes Jeremy's car in retaliation, slashing his tires. Brad and Sara walk away together, with Brad expressing interest in seeing her again, while Ian and Juliette look forward to their next date.

== Cast ==
- Amber Benson as Amy
- Scott Bloom as Brad
- Tobey Maguire as Ian
- Leonardo DiCaprio as Derek
- Kevin Connolly as Jeremy
- Jenny Lewis as Sara
- Heather McComb as Constance
- Meadow Sisto as Juliet
- Marissa Ribisi as Tracy
- Nikki Cox as Karen
- Jeremy Sisto as Bernard
- Ethan Suplee as Big Bum

== Production ==
Much of the film was improvised. DiCaprio and Maguire were paid $575 per day to appear in the film.

== Release issues ==
DiCaprio and Maguire were opposed to having the film released. They claimed the film was pitched to them as a short film but was later edited into a feature-length film. Producer David Stutman said Maguire opposed the film's release due to his improvised performance revealing too much about him. Stutman filed a lawsuit in 1998 against DiCaprio and Maguire. They settled on allowing the film to be released outside the U.S. and Canada, and had some scenes removed.

=== Free streaming ===
In 2014, Dale Wheatley published an open letter to DiCaprio on the website freedonsplum.com, giving his take on the history of the film and the ensuing legal issues. Wheatley also uploaded the film to the website so it could be streamed for free. It was removed in January 2016 after a third-party notification by DiCaprio and Maguire claiming infringement. Wheatley made the following statement to Fox News: "It saddens me deeply that in 2016 we witness the senseless oppression of film and art by one of America's most beloved actors. While the world celebrates — and certainly Americans celebrate — his great achievements in cinema, he chooses to use an iron fist to suppress the work of many other artists including him in a film made 20 years ago."

== Reception ==
It premiered on 10 February 2001 in Berlin.

Time Out New York writer Mike D'Angelo called it "the best film [I saw] in Berlin".

Variety called it an "unpleasant and tedious ensemble".
