= Letiche =

Creature in Cajun folklore in Louisiana

The letiche is a creature in Cajun folklore in Louisiana, United States, which haunts the bayous (swamps). It is variously described as the soul of an illegitimate unbaptized infant, or a human child raised by alligators. The letiche is said to lurk in the bayous and upset boats and attack travelers.
