= Forever My Girl =

- Theatrical release poster
- Directed by: Bethany Ashton Wolf
- Screenplay by: Bethany Ashton Wolf
- Based on: Forever My Girl by Heidi McLaughlin
- Produced by: Mickey Liddell; Jennifer Monroe; Pete Shilaimon
- Starring: Alex Roe; Jessica Rothe; John Benjamin Hickey; Abby Ryder Fortson; Travis Tritt
- Cinematography: Duane Manwiller
- Edited by: Priscilla Nedd-Friendly
- Music by: Brett Boyett
- Production company: LD Entertainment
- Distributed by: Roadside Attractions
- Release date: January 19, 2018 (United States)
- Running time: 103 minutes
- Country: United States
- Language: English
- Budget: $3.5 million
- Box office: $16.4 million

Forever My Girl is a 2018 American romantic drama film written and directed by Bethany Ashton Wolf based on the novel by Heidi McLaughlin. It follows a country musician (Alex Roe) who sets out to win over the girl he left at the altar eight years before (Jessica Rothe). Abby Ryder Fortson, Travis Tritt, and John Benjamin Hickey also star.

The film was released in the United States on January 19, 2018. It received negative reviews from critics and grossed $16 million on a $3.5 million budget.

== Plot ==
In St. Augustine, Louisiana, Josie is left at the altar by her fiancé Liam to pursue fame and fortune. Eight years later, he is a successful country singer.

The morning after a concert in New Orleans, Liam wakes up to discover the girl he brought home jumping excitedly on and breaking his cell phone. Panicked after realizing, he takes the phone to an electronics store where the manager fixes it for him. Asked why he still has the damaged phone, Liam tells him it has an important message on it.

While watching TV, Liam learns that Mason, his childhood best friend, has been killed in a car accident. He returns to St. Augustine to attend the funeral. Although Liam attempts to be discreet, Josie bumps into him. After the burial, she punches him in the gut.

Liam stays with his father, Pastor Brian, although he's bitter that Liam also cut off contact with him. While reacquainting himself with the town, he encounters Josie at her flower shop. Liam learns that she has a seven-year-old daughter, Billy, and that he is the father. Josie confesses that she found out she was pregnant two weeks after he left her at the altar. Although she tried to contact him, Liam never returned her call, so she decided to raise Billy alone.

Liam is surprised to learn that his father also tried to tell him that Josie was pregnant at one of his concerts seven years ago. However, he was too absorbed in his fame and didn't listen to him. Liam eventually persuades Josie to let him spend time with Billy, albeit on her terms. Billy quickly realizes Liam is her father, much to Josie's surprise, and agrees to get to know each other.

Liam and Billy bond as she displays musical ability. Josie agrees to let her stay the night with him. As Liam tucks her in, Billy asks him why he left her mom. He admits he was young and confused, and regrets it, which both Josie and Brian overhear.

After Billy falls asleep, Josie asks Liam out saying she wants to have a date with "the Liam Page" as she'd never experienced his fame with him. He flies her to New Orleans for their date, and when they are briefly questioned by the press as to who Josie is, he answers "She's the one".

After returning to St. Augustine, Liam and Billy continue to bond. She chokes on her lunch but Liam freezes after having a flashback to his mother's death. Jake, Josie's brother, saves Billy. Guilt-ridden, Liam gets drunk at a bar. Jake finds him to say Josie and Billy would be better off without him.

While bandaging a wound Liam sustained that evening, Brian reveals that when Liam's mother died, he was so absorbed in his own grief that he overlooked his son's, so apologizes to him for it. Brian theorizes that he became famous and cut contact with him as his way of dealing with the grief over his mother's death, to which Liam agrees.

Liam goes the next morning without saying goodbye to Josie and Billy, leaving a note telling Brian that they are better off without him. Returning to his tour, he performs in London. However, his manager Sam inspires him to return to his family.

At the airport, Liam responds to the message on the answering machine that Josie left for him 8 years earlier, in which he explains his feeling that losing his mother caused him to fear losing her, so he left. He returns to St. Augustine to reconcile with Josie.

Liam and Josie get married, and he plays a song with Billy both at her school talent show and on his tour in Berlin.

== Cast ==
- Alex Roe as Liam Lincoln Page
- Jessica Rothe as Josie Mollee Swan
- Abby Ryder Fortson as Billy Anne Swan
- Travis Tritt as Walt
- Peter Cambor as Sam, Liam's manager
- Gillian Vigman as Doris, a publicist
- Judith Hoag as Dr. Whitman
- Tyler Riggs as Jake Swan
- John Benjamin Hickey as Pastor Brian Page

== Production ==
=== Development ===
Author Heidi McLaughlin was inspired to write Forever My Girl after seeing a picture of a man on Facebook who looked like he was trying to apologize to a girl. To choose the name of Liam Page it took her a total of 10 or 15 minutes, and that same night she wrote the first 5,000 words. After her book was published, she received an offer from LD Entertainment for a film based on the book. On adapting the book for film, Roe said, "It was difficult to accommodate everything in an hour and a half obviously and there were also other changes that Bethany [Wolf] thought were important."

=== Casting ===
McLaughlin said that writing for Liam and Josie was easy because she has friends who are in bands. For the role of Liam, Roe had to learn to sing and play the guitar. Brett Boyett, the film's musical supervisor, helped him practice every day for almost three months. To research his accent Roe watched interviews of country music singers. He was nervous about acting on stage and talked to country group Little Big Town about performing in front of 50,000 people. Roe formed a band in Los Angeles and held several performances for close friends to practice. McLaughlin positively compared Roe to actor Stephen Amell, stating that, "Alex Roe looks like Amell but younger, so for me it's a perfect choice." Rothe said she was attracted to the role of Josie for her strength and female empowerment. McLaughlin originally pictured the Australian supermodel Miranda Kerr for the role, and remarked that Rothe resembled a blonde version of Kerr. Rothe and Roe did not know each other beforehand but had several friends in common, and hung out several times before filming in Atlanta to feel comfortable around each other.

== Reception ==
=== Box office ===
Forever My Girl opened on January 19, 2018, and grossed $4.7 million from 1,115 theaters in its opening weekend, finishing 10th. It held well in its second weekend, dropping just 12% to $3.7 million. The film went on to make a total of $16.4 million, against a production budget of $3.5 million.

=== Critical response ===
On the review aggregator website Rotten Tomatoes, 25% of 53 critics' reviews are positive, with an average rating of 4.5/10. The website's consensus reads: "Forever My Girl offers a suitably picturesque placeholder for romance fans between Nicholas Sparks films, but other viewers may end up crying for the wrong reasons." On Metacritic, the film has a weighted average score of 36 out of 100, based on 18 critics, indicating "generally unfavorable" reviews. Audiences polled by CinemaScore gave the film an average grade of "A" on an A+ to F scale.

Joe Leydon of Variety said the film "resembles nothing so much as a prosaic adaptation of a second-tier Nicholas Sparks novel, and doubtless will play best with audiences who think critics are much too harsh on movies that really are spawned by Sparks' literary output." Brad Wheeler of The Globe and Mail gave it 1.5/4 stars, calling it "sentimental dreck of the fluffiest order." The Detroit News's Adam Graham gave it a C grade, saying it was "barely a step above a Lifetime movie" and "pandering in its portrayal of good, hard-working, church-going country folk and dismissive of big city types, what with their fancy salad orders and all." Alonso Durande of TheWrap unfavorably compared the film to Hallmark Channel movies, "which would have at least given the female lead something of a personality and a plot arc; this movie's all about the celebrity and his emotional journey, while the woman stands around like a prize waiting to be won, the Blessed Hometown Honey."

Frank Scheck of The Hollywood Reporter wrote, "The two leads are both highly appealing, with Roe credible as a country music superstar whose repertoire includes such original songs as 'Don't Water Down My Whiskey' and Rothe delivering a warm portrayal that's miles away from her recent starring role in the horror film Happy Death Day." Katie Walsh of the Tribune News Service called the film "an uncomplicated romantic tale of a man trying to do right by the women in his life may even be pure fantasy. But for an audience, seeking fluffy, escapist, country music-tinged romance, it'll hit a sweet spot."

=== Home media ===
The film was released on DVD and Blu-ray on April 24, 2018.
