= Bethany Ashton Wolf =

American film director and screenwriter

- Born: Louisiana
- Other name: Bethany Ashton
- Occupations: Film director, screenwriter
- Spouse: Josh Wolf (m. 2004)

Bethany Ashton Wolf is an American film director and screenwriter.

Wolf is the writer and director of Forever My Girl (2018), and was one of the writers of Don's Plum, a film starring Leonardo DiCaprio and Tobey Maguire which was prevented from being released in the United States due to litigation.

== Biography ==
Wolf is a native of Lake Charles, Louisiana. Wolf graduated from St. Louis Catholic High School before moving to Los Angeles.

Wolf started her career as an actress in Los Angeles, California. In 2006, Little Chenier was Wolf's debut film as director.

Wolf has been married to comedian Josh Wolf since 2004.

== Filmography ==
Selected filmography (director and writer):

- 2001 Don's Plum' - as writer.
- 2006 Little Chenier (2006) - as director, producer, writer.
- 2014 Midnight Juliet - director, writer. Short drama.
- 2018 Forever My Girl (2018) - director, writer.
