= Steve Johnson (Days of Our Lives) =

Fictional soap opera character

- Days of Our Lives character
- Portrayed by: Stephen Nichols
- Duration: 1985–1990; 2006–2009; 2015–present
- First appearance: June 13, 1985
- Created by: Sheri Anderson, Thom Racina and Leah Laiman
- Introduced by: Betty Corday and Al Rabin (1985); Ken Corday and Stephen Wyman (2006); Ken Corday, Albert Alarr and Greg Meng (2015)
- Spin-off appearances: Days of Our Lives: Beyond Salem (2022)
In-universe information
- Other names: Patch; Steven Earl Johnson; Stefano DiMera
- Occupation: Private Investigator; ISA Agent; Police officer; Merchant Marine; Deliveryman
- Family: Johnson
- Parents: Duke Johnson; Jo Johnson
- Brothers: Jack Deveraux
- Sisters: Adrienne Johnson Kiriakis
- Wife: Marina Toscano (until 1989); Kayla Brady (1988–1989, 1990–2012, 2017–2020, 2021–present)
- Sons: Tripp Dalton; Joey Johnson
- Daughters: Stephanie Johnson
- Uncles: Earl Duke Johnson
- Nieces and nephews: Abigail Deveraux; JJ Deveraux; Victor Kiriakis II (adoptive); Joseph Kiriakis (adoptive); Sonny Kiriakis; Gwen Rizczech

Steve "Patch" Johnson is a fictional character on Days of Our Lives, an American soap opera on the NBC network. Created by head writers Sheri Anderson, Thom Racina and Leah Laiman, he has been portrayed by only Stephen Nichols on and off since 1985.

== Casting ==
In 2009, Nichols and Mary Beth Evans were written out of the soap as Steve and his wife Kayla Brady; Nichols said that he was not surprised that this happened, telling Digital Spy, "The support and story had not been there since [producer] Ed Scott was let go, which, by the way, was a huge mistake. Ed's departure sent morale on the set on a downward spiral."

== Storylines ==
=== 1985–1990 ===
Steve served in the Merchant Marines with Bo Brady and they were good friends until they both fell for a woman named Britta. They competed for her, sometimes violently, and went along with her when she asked them to get tattoos. They didn't know that the tattoos were a code for secret bonds she was hiding. As the competition accelerated, Bo and Steve got in a knife fight which ended with Steve losing his eye.

They split up and Steve returned to Salem to work for Victor Kiriakis. He was deployed to get a piece of film from Kimberly Brady, but the film found its way to Melissa and Pete Jannings who promptly went on the run when they figured out how dangerous it was. Bo and Hope Brady went off in pursuit, sure that the film would give them the evidence they needed to convict Kiriakis for his crimes. Although Victor and Steve were both arrested, they managed to get free thanks to Victor's blackmailing Larry Welch to taking the blame.

Steve's next project went even worse. He held a mysterious man covered in bandages and planned to sell him to Victor. The plan fell through when the man escaped. Things got even uglier for him when Britta walked back into his life. Although they began seeing each other, she wound up injured after someone tried to shoot him and shot her in the crossfire. Once she recovered, she walked out. This left him with the chance to meet and fall in love with Kayla Brady. After they hooked up, he began having disturbing memories and became increasingly distant from her. He soon found himself enmeshed in a host of problems. After he discovered that his sister — Adrienne — killed their father in self-defense, he decided to shield her and take the blame. All the while she had blocked the incident from her mind, but as the memories returned, she confessed just before he could be sentenced for the crime.

Next, Steve got mixed up with Harper Deveraux, helping him to fake his death so that he could escape while battling with Steve's old boss Victor. Learning of the plot, Victor had the blanks in Steve's gun changed for live ones and Harper ended up in a coma after being shot by Steve. Grabbing Kayla, Steve went on the run only to be cleared of the charges while he was away.

When he returned to Salem with Kayla, things would take an unexpected turn. He and his sister had recently discovered that Jack Deveraux was their long lost brother. Because Jack was dying at the time they didn't bother him with this fact. At the same time, Kayla became Jack's nurse and he fell madly in love with her. Seeing this, Steve started to push her away so that she could spend her time with Jack and make him happy. This proved effective and Jack married Kayla, but the plan quickly collapsed after that. Steve had discovered that Harper was poisoning Kayla so he kidnapped her to save her life. Although she was already ill, she refused to believe him and ran. This was enough to spark things up between them, however, and they began an affair which they tried to shield from Jack. The affair was publicly exposed in the newspaper. Jack was crushed, raped Kayla and had Steve beaten. Steve went after him and wound up pushing him off a roof. The fall resulted in severe injuries and Jack needed a kidney transplant to live. Since Steve, as his brother, was a match, he agreed to give up a kidney for him, though only at his mother's prompting.

The nightmare wasn't over for Kayla though. Harper was on the loose and he kidnapped her and Kimberly when they realized that he was the Riverfront Knifer. Steve saved them, but Kayla was injured in the fallout and suffered from deafness and loss of speech. After a successful surgery, she could hear again and Steve asked her to marry him. They did and her speech returned just in time for her to say 'I do.' The happy couple went off to the Orient for their honeymoon. There they encountered a deaf boy named Benjy. They returned to Salem with the child but his mother soon came after them. She told them that his father was a nasty man but let them look out for him, hoping that they could protect him. She was found dead soon after. The mysterious father turned out to be the nefarious Stefano DiMera but, to ease their burden, Benjy's grandfather, Orion, arrived to take him away to live in secrecy.

Danger ended up coming at Steve and Kayla from another source soon after. Harper had escaped prison and kidnapped her once again, but Steve managed to save her and put Harper back in prison.

The next year, Steve became mixed up with Nick Corelli after he found his severely burned body. Steve hid Nick while he recovered and had to bring Kayla into the fold to help out. When Nick was sufficiently recovered, he left them but his bad luck followed him. Steve would have to come to his rescue when he needed help trying to get rid of Eddie who was trying to steal his secret fortune. When Eddie was shot in a standoff, Nick gave Steve and Kayla his mansion as a token of his thanks.

Later that year, Steve joined the ISA and was sent to track an arsonist who had been torching black churches in the south. His investigation brought him to Saul Taylor's revivalist camp, which just happened to be set up right outside Salem. After undergoing some facial surgery and getting a glass eye, he infiltrated the group under the alias of Brother Daniel Lucas. He soon discovered that Taylor was using the camp as a front for stolen goods and that he was behind many of the bombings which included an explosion that killed his best friend's parents. The investigation ended when Taylor's partner shot him and then went off a cliff during a fight.

Returning to focus his attention on Kayla, Steve found that she was expecting a child. Their happiness was complicated by the arrival of Marina Toscano, who claimed to be Steve's wife. While he had indeed married her, he had thought her long since dead, confessing to Kayla that he believed that he'd killed her during a seaboard fight. Marina made it clear that she didn't want Steve back, she just needed his help getting a key that they'd thrown into the sea. Hoping for a quick divorce, he agreed to help her and went to Italy to get the key. While there, he had to fight off Kiriakis' henchmen when they tried to get the key from him. The fight left him with a broken glass eye. Meanwhile, in Salem, Kayla had had enough of Marina putting her husband and family in danger and the pair got in a fight. Later, Marina turned up dead and Kayla became a key suspect. To make things worse, Kiriakis kidnapped her in a bid to get the key. She was released when Isabella gave the key to Victor. The couple then rushed to get married before she gave birth and she was arrested for Marina's murder during the wedding. Kayla stood trial, thanks largely to doctored evidence that Kiriakis had sent to John Black. She was convicted and gave Steve their newborn daughter, Stephanie, to raise. He hired a nanny, Kelly Parker, who, unfortunately, turned out to be quite crazy and kidnapped the child when Kayla escaped from prison. Steve and Kayla went in pursuit of her, tracking her to Australia where they were lucky enough to find Bo and Hope who helped them track her down. After getting Stephanie back, they had the additional good news that Kayla had been cleared of the murder conviction and they all returned to Salem.

Unfortunately, Harper Devereaux wasn't finished with the couple and escaped from prison once again for revenge. Harper tried to shoot Steve while he and Kayla were married, but his son, Jack, learning of the plot, stopped him and pushed him from the bell tower from which he took aim. After he plummeted to his death, the wedding continued. Now Steve decided to turn over another leaf in his life and become a police officer. While out on patrol one night, he investigated a boat where he discovered a card from Lawrence Alamain. The boat then promptly blew up and left him severely injured. He went into a coma but recovered. Fearing what he knew, Lawrence had Steve's IV poisoned. When Steve died, Lawrence then had his casket switched before it could be buried and rushed Steve's body off.

=== 2006–2009 ===
Sixteen years later, Steve reappeared suffering from severe amnesia and calling himself Nick. He was discovered by Jack, who took him back to Salem, shocking Kayla by showing up at Jennifer Horton and Frankie's wedding. He had no idea who she was, but she tried her best to make him remember. After the pair was attacked by a lethal biological agent, they recuperated in the hospital but her recovery was complicated by a reaction to the antidote. Steve faked his memories in a bid to help Kayla recover, giving her the confidence to get better. She soon realized that he'd been faking and distanced herself from him. From then on, he tried hard to take back the life that he'd lost and get her back. It took a lot of effort to convince her that he was his old self again, but they eventually reunited.

The reunion was far from smooth, however. In Steve's absence from Salem, he was held by the DiMeras who tortured and brainwashed him into being one of their soldiers. As Steve began to realize this, he tried to resist and to kill the man who was controlling him: Stefano's son, EJ DiMera. This has proved difficult and EJ managed to force Steve into kidnapping John Black—so that he could steal his kidney—and in committing other illegal acts. Steve began pushing Kayla away to protect her and went in and out of mental hospitals where he was still at the mercy of EJ and his agents.

Later, Steve helped Hope Brady get out of the DiMera house by telling Stefano DiMera that they were having an affair. Stefano believed it and let Steve and Hope leave. Steve has been involved in helping end the vendetta including assisting in faking Stefano's death, but when Andre killed Benjy, Steve lost control. He kidnapped Stefano and demanded Andre bring Roman Brady—who Andre had kidnapped—to the television stations where he was holding Stefano. Andre did as Steve said and released Roman. Realizing Steve was out of his mind with grief, Stefano dropped all charges against Steve for the kidnapping, doing so to honor Benjy's memory.

Steve was then kidnapped by his old lover Ava Vitali. Steve and Kayla's baby boy, named Joe, was born prematurely. After Kayla survived being accidentally shot by Hope, she and Steve quietly left town. As of 2014, Steve has rejoined the ISA as an undercover agent, and Kayla has returned to Salem where she serves as a doctor.

=== 2015–present ===
In August 2015, Steve suddenly returned to Salem after Joey (now a teenager) showed up on his doorstep, having run away from his boarding school. After returning, Steve worked to heal his relationship with Kayla and his family. Then, after resigning from the ISA and rescuing Bo from the clutches of an unknown group who had captured and tortured him, Steve entered into a partnership with John Black, another ex-ISA agent, to start a new private investigation business, called "Black Patch."

Shortly after he reunited with Kayla, Steve's crazy ex-girlfriend Ava (who he dated when he had amnesia) returned to Salem pretending to have a terminal illness. She was lying, however, and her real goal was to get rid of Kayla and have Steve help her search for their child—a child he didn't know existed and one she was forced to give up for adoption. After attacking and kidnapping Kayla, Ava forced Steve to go with her to search for that child by threatening Kayla's life. Steve complied, but when they received news that the child died as an infant, Ava still refused to release Kayla unless Steve slept with her, which he reluctantly did. Afterward, Steve returned home to Kayla. Their joyful reunion was short-lived, however, when Ava sent a video of their forced encounter. Devastated, Kayla kicked Steve out. Their relationship issues took a backburner, however, when Joey murdered Ava. Steve felt guilty for having brought Ava into their lives and took the fall for the murder. While Steve was willing to go to jail for his son, the ISA came to his rescue at the last minute and the charges were dropped.

In the aftermath, Steve fought to reunite with Kayla, who was convinced Steve's need for danger and her desire for safety could never find a middle ground. During this time, Kayla was diagnosed with a subdural hematoma, which resulted from Ava knocking her over the head. Steve wanted to be by her side, but Kayla continued to push him away. While not yet reunited romantically, Steve and Kayla worked together to rescue Joey from a cult. Upon their return to Salem, Steve stuck by Kayla's side as she underwent surgery to address the hematoma. As she healed, Kayla softened and shortly after they reunited. On Valentines Day 2017, Steve and Kayla married for the third time.

Following the wedding, Steve received word that the child he'd had with Ava—the one he believed died as an infant—was indeed alive and living under the name Tripp Dalton. Steve and Kayla found Tripp and he returned to Salem with them. Upon arriving in Salem, Tripp learned that his mother was dead, supposedly killed by his father, but soon came to believe his mother had been killed by Kayla. When an angry Trip sought revenge against Kayla, Steve rescued her. But the family was left in shambles, as a remorseful Joey feel even more guilty for killing Ava. Eventually, against Steve and Kayla's wishes, Joey turned himself in and went to prison for killing Ava.

In early 2018, Steve began having trouble with his vision. Unbeknownst to Steve, his vision loss was a result of bing poisoned by John Black, his friend and business partner. John was being forced by an his evil ISA boss to poison Steve. They caught the poison in time to spare Steve's life, but not his vision. For a while, Steve was blind, but partial vision was restored thanks to a bionic eye. The bionic eye, which Kayla had secretly obtained from Stefan Dimera, was then hacked and used to gain access to top-secret information. Steve was arrested for espionage and left Salem.

While Steve was eventually released from prison, he chose to hunt down the people who had hacked his eye instead of returning home to his wife and family. A frustrated Kayla begged Steve to return home, but he refused. Unbeknownst to Kayla, Steve had actually been on his way home to her when been kidnapped by Stefano DiMera's men. Stefano was dying and looking for a host body in which to implant a microchip with his mind/memories/essence.

In late 2019, the whole town of Salem jumped forward a year ... and suddenly it was 2020. During the year that passed, Kayla continued to beg Steve—whose awareness had been wiped and whose body was now the host for Stefano DiMera—to return home to her. At her wits end, Kayla sent Steve divorce papers ... and they were returned with his supposed signature. As 2020 neared its end, Stefano DiMera returned to Salem, sporting Steve's body and pretending to be "Patch." Kayla, who had since begun a relationship with Justin, was devastated when a callous "Steve," claimed he no longer loved her. Stefano worked alongside Princess Gina (who was occupying Hope's body), but was unable to keep up the "Patch" persona and eventually revealed himself to Kayla. Kayla tried to get through to the real Steve, but Stefano convinced her it was no use—her Steve was dead. Soon after, Stefano was stabbed in the eye and while he was in the hospital, Kayla was able to successfully remove the microchip. Steve initially woke up with no memory, but just as his memories returned, Kayla had to inform him that he'd lost more than a year of his life and that she'd moved on with Justin.

Steve still loved Kayla and wanted to fight for her, but ultimately decided she was better off without him and pushed her to stay with Justin. He couldn't watch her marry Justin, however, and decided to instead rejoin the ISA. Just as Steve was about to leave town, Kayla learned the truth at her wedding to Justin. Kayla caught Steve at the airport, just in time, and the two reunited. Shortly after their reunion, Tripp returned to Salem for medical school and was accused of rape by Kayla's niece Allie. The situation drove a wedge between Steve and Kayla as he supported his son and she supported her niece. They overcame the wedge, and when Tripp was ultimately proven innocent, they returned to happy.

On Valentines Day 2021, Steve and Kayla married for the fourth time.

== Reception ==
In 2020, Charlie Mason from Soaps She Knows placed Steve at #23 on their list of the 35 most memorable characters from Days of Our Lives, saying that "The classic Days of Our Lives anti-hero, Stephen Nichols’ erstwhile Patch was from the beginning of his long run a character so compelling that we were willing to squint to see his underlying, ahem, sweetness."
