= Little Chenier =

Little Chenier: A Cajun Story
- Theatrical release poster
- Directed by: Bethany Ashton
- Written by: Bethany Ashton; Jace Johnson
- Produced by: Clifton Collins Jr.; Jane Dennison; Jessica Schatz; Kira Bosak; Amy N. Johnson; Bethany Ashton; Gavin Boyd; Jace Johnson; Ron West
- Starring: Johnathon Schaech; Frederick Koehler; Tamara Braun; Jeremy Davidson; Clifton Collins Jr.; Chris Mulkey
- Edited by: Brian Anton
- Music by: Michael Picton
- Distributed by: Radio London Films
- Release dates: October 20, 2006 (Austin Film Festival); January 18, 2008 (United States)
- Running time: 120 minutes
- Country: United States
- Language: English
- Budget: $6 million
- Box office: $87,939

Little Chenier is a 2006 American drama film directed by Bethany Ashton Wolf and written by Jace Johnson and Wolf. It is set in the bayous of Louisiana, and stars Johnathon Schaech, Frederick Koehler, Tamara Braun, Jeremy Davidson, Clifton Collins Jr., and Chris Mulkey. The film completed principal photography in Louisiana in August 2005, just days before Hurricane Katrina and Hurricane Rita hit all of the areas they had filmed in. Wolf and Johnson, devastated for the Cajun communities of Southwest Louisiana, were grateful that they could at least give them all this film, celebrating the memory of their land, its beauty and their way of life. Little Chenier premiered at the Austin Film Festival on October 20, 2006 to a standing ovation, filled with Cajuns, Southerners, and Louisianans. It continued on the festival circuit through 2007, winning 10 Best Picture Awards. It was released January 18, 2008 to a successful theatrical run by Radio London Films, then on DVD July 8, 2008.

== Plot ==
Two brothers are victimized by a weak and jealous man in this drama shot on location in Louisiana. Beauxregard 'Beaux' Dupuis (Jonathan Schaech) lives in the swamps of Cajun country on a small stretch of land called Little Chenier with his younger mentally handicapped brother, Pemon (Fred Koehler). Beaux supports them both by running a bait shop. Beaux is in love with Mary-Louise (Tamara Braun), who has left him to elope with the son of the sheriff, Carl. Neither Carl nor Beaux are fond of each other. Carl also enjoys tormenting Pemon. It is revealed that Mary-Louise left Beaux for Carl when Carl threatened to take her family's property away. When Carl's father is killed in the line of duty, his son takes his place; it isn't long before Carl learns Mary-Louise has been having an affair with Beaux, and he uses his new authority to put Pemon behind bars on false change as a way of punishing Beaux.

== Main cast ==
- Johnathon Schaech as Beauxregard "Beaux" Dupuis
- Frederick Koehler as Pemon Dupuis
- Tamara Braun as Marie-Louise LeBauve
- Jeremy Davidson as Carl LeBauve
- Clifton Collins Jr. as "T-Boy" Trahan
- Chris Mulkey as Sheriff Kline LeBauve

== Hurricane Rita ==
Three weeks after Hurricane Katrina hit Louisiana, Hurricane Rita hit the Little Chenier, the actual place of most filming and the various parishes used for filming. Virtually all of the sets and locations used in the film were destroyed, leaving many locals homeless. The film is believed to be the only known footage of the area. Bethany Ashton and her family set up a non-profit organization called Rita Remembered to rebuild the communities and help those in need, who were largely left out of the eventual help offered to victims of Katrina. The charity is unique in that Ashton and the fellow creators invite people to correspond directly with them to find out exactly how their contributions were used.
