= Natalia Livingston =

American actress (born 1976)

- Born: March 26, 1976 (age 50); Johnstown, Pennsylvania, U.S.
- Occupation: Actress
- Years active: 2002–present
- Spouse: Matt Aldag (m. 2016)
- Children: 2

Natalia Livingston (born March 26, 1976) is an American actress. She is known for her roles as Emily Quartermaine (for which she won a Daytime Emmy Award) and Rebecca Shaw on ABC's General Hospital, and for playing Taylor Walker on the NBC soap opera Days of Our Lives.

== Early life and education ==
Livingston was born in Johnstown, Pennsylvania. Her father, James Livingston, is a physician, and her mother, Martha Echavarría, was an artist and Spanish teacher. Livingston is of half Mexican descent, and is fluent in Spanish. She was raised in Macon, Georgia, and spent her summers in Mexico.

Livingston obtained a degree in sociology from Emory University. She started acting in high school and continued her interests in acting by taking acting classes in college. After graduation, she took an internship in the field of social work, and later moved to Los Angeles to pursue her acting career. While working at Home Depot, she was discovered and started acting in national commercials.

== Career ==
Livingston first appeared as Emily Quartermaine on General Hospital on April 1, 2003. The adopted daughter of established characters Alan and Monica Quartermaine, Emily was a prominent character who notably battled breast cancer in 2003. On May 20, 2005, Livingston won the Daytime Emmy Award for Outstanding Supporting Actress in a Drama Series for her portrayal of Emily. She decided to leave the series, and Emily was murdered in November 2007; however, Livingston continued to appear periodically until May 7, 2008 as a hallucination of Emily seen by her love interest, Nikolas Cassadine (Tyler Christopher).

On January 15, 2009, Livingston returned to General Hospital for eleven (11) months as new character Rebecca Shaw, Emily's biological twin sister who was put up for adoption by their father and mother.

Livingston also appeared in the films Popstar (2005), and West of Brooklyn (2008), as well as the 2012 film Rough Hustle.

Livingston was cast as Taylor Walker, Nicole's sister, on Days of Our Lives on January 26, 2011.

In 2011, Livingston produced a documentary, The Man Who Ate New Orleans, which aired on PBS in 2012.

== Personal life ==
Livingston dated her General Hospital co-star Tyler Christopher from mid-2004 to early 2006. Livingston married longtime boyfriend Dr. Matt Aldag, a neuroscientist and scientific author, on September 3, 2016, in Bedford, Pennsylvania. In February 2018, Livingston announced she was expecting her first child, a daughter, born on September 6, 2018. It was reported on Instagram that she was named Colette Allegria Ginny-Martita Aldag. On September 2, 2020, via instagram, she announced the birth of a son, John Huxley Livingston Aldag.

Prior to her role as breast cancer survivor Emily Quartermaine, Livingston had performed a breast self-exam after watching an episode of The Oprah Winfrey Show that promoted awareness for the disease. She found a lump, which turned out to be benign.

Livingston has been actively involved with the Susan G. Komen Foundation and Revlon Run/Walk for Women, helping to raise money and increase awareness through national campaigns and PSAs. She has traveled widely in Europe, the Middle East, Russia, Africa and North and South America, and during a trip to India worked at Mother Teresa's Home for the Dying.

== Filmography ==
Film and television roles
Year	Title	Role	Notes
2002	Big Fat Liar	Girl at Movie Premiere	Film
2003–2009, 2013–2014	General Hospital	Emily Quartermaine	Regular role
2005	Popstar	Mary Brighton	Film
2008	West of Brooklyn	Matty Jensen	Film
2009	General Hospital	Rebecca Shaw	Regular role
2011	Days of Our Lives	Taylor Walker	Regular role
2014–2017	Tainted Dreams	Liza Park	Web series
2014	Rough Hustle	Allie	Film
2015	Cyber Case	Jackie Fletcher	Film; also known as Online Abduction
2019	Full Count	Katherine Young	Film

== Awards ==
- 2005: Won Daytime Emmy Award for Outstanding Supporting Actress in GH as Emily Quartermaine.
