= Claire O'Callaghan =

Irish journalist

Claire O'Callaghan is an Irish news and sports journalist and radio presenter, employed by iRadio. Claire reports and reads the news and sport semi nationally for i102-104 and sister station i105-107.

Claire used to work for Belfast radio station Citybeat. She has a BA Honours Degree in English and English Literature from Queen's University Belfast, and a Masters in Journalism from the University of Ulster.

Claire was the winner of The Journalism Diversity Fund bursary in 2008. She is now working with RTÉ four live and The Daily Show.
