= Bottom of the barrel =

Bottom of the barrel may refer to:

- Bottom of the barrel, an English idiom originally referring to dregs, now meaning anything of low quality
- Bottoms of Barrels, a 2006 album by Tilly and the Wall
- The former title of Chris and Ciara, an Irish radio show

== See also ==
- Barrel
