= Laurita Blewitt =

Irish radio presenter

- Born: Laurita Blewitt; 28 September 1983 (age 41); Knockmore, County Mayo, Ireland
- Education: St. Mary's Secondary School, Ballina, County Mayo; Ballyfermot College of Further Education
- Occupation(s): Podcaster, fundraising
- Employer(s): The Mayo News iRadio; Government of Ireland; MidWest Radio
- Known for: Cousin of President of the United States Joe Biden, podcasting, fundraising, news reporting
- Spouse: Joe Brolly (m. 2022)

Laurita Blewitt (born 28 September 1983) is an Irish radio presenter and producer from Knockmore, County Mayo. She is an experienced fundraiser for the Mayo Roscommon Hospice Foundation. She was a podcaster on The Tommy and Hector Podcast with Laurita Blewitt from September 2020 until its closure in April 2024.

Blewitt previously served as sports reporter for The Mayo News from 2006 to 2007, producer on i102-104FM's The Tommy and Hector Show and Breakfast with Bernard & Keith from 2007 to 2011, parliamentary assistant to Fine Gael TD John O'Mahony from 2010 to 2011 and traffic manager for MidWest Radio from 2012 to 2015.

Blewitt is the third cousin of the 46th president of the United States, Joe Biden.

== Early life ==
Blewitt was born in Knockmore, County Mayo, Ireland. She attended St. Mary's Secondary School in Ballina, County Mayo from 1996 to 2002 and Ballyfermot College of Further Education from 2003 to 2005.

== Personal life ==
In late 2021, Blewitt became engaged to Joe Brolly, a Gaelic football analyst, former player and current barrister. They married at the Ice House Hotel in County Mayo in August 2022.

=== Cousin of Joe Biden ===
Blewitt is the third cousin of Joe Biden, the 46th president of the United States.

Blewitt and her older brother Joe have met Biden several times. In 2016, the Blewitts met Biden in Ireland when he visited as the 47th vice president of the United States, and in 2017 in the White House, when Biden was awarded the Presidential Medal of Freedom from President Barack Obama.

On Inauguration Day of Joe Biden on 20 January 2021, Blewitt appeared on British daytime television programme This Morning and praised Biden for overcoming "such adversity" in his life and called criticism of his age "cheap and nasty".
