= Beat Control =

EP by Tilly and the Wall
- Released: March 4, 2008
- Genre: Indie pop
- Length: 8:44
- Label: Team Love Records
- Producer: Mike Mogis

Tilly and the Wall chronology
Bottoms of Barrels (2006)	Beat Control (2008)	O (2008)

"Beat Control" is a digital EP by indie pop group Tilly and the Wall, and the name of its title track. The EP was released via Team Love Records to online music stores on March 4, 2008. A limited edition 7" vinyl was also released. "Beat Control" is not on the band's third album o, but "Cacophony" is. The EP debuted on the UK Singles Chart at #153.

== Music video ==
The music video for "Beat Control" premiered on February 25. The band perform in fluorescent clothing with a neon glow surrounding them, against patterned backgrounds.

== Track listing ==
- Digital EP:
1. "Beat Control" – 2:53
2. "Cacophony" – 2:27
3. "L3t Teh B34t C0ns013 Yov" (Pewep Merix) – 3:24
- 7" Vinyl:
1. "Beat Control" – 2:53
2. "L3t Teh B34t C0ns013 Yov" (Pewep Merix) – 3:24
- CD single:
1. "Beat Control" – 2:47
2. "Too Excited" – 3:18
