= Number Zero with a Bullet =

# Zero with a Bullet

Studio album by David Dondero
- Released: August 3, 2010
- Genre: Folk rock, Indie rock, Country rock, singer-songwriter
- Length: 41:32
- Label: Team Love
- Producer: AJ Mogis

David Dondero chronology
Simple Love (2007)	# Zero with a Bullet (2010)	A Pre-existing Condition (2011)

Professional ratings
Review scores
Source	Rating
AllMusic	4/5
Pitchfork Media	6.8/10
PopMatters	7/10

# Zero with a Bullet is the eighth album by American folk rock musician David Dondero, released on August 3, 2010, by Team Love Records. It came three years after his second release with Team Love, Simple Love.

== Track listing ==
1. Jesus From 12 To 6 – 3:52
2. Caught The Song – 2:27
3. Just A Baby in Your Momma's Eyes – 3:48
4. Number Zero with a Bullet – 3:59
5. It's Peaceful Here – 6:02
6. Carolina Moon – 3:20
7. Wherever You Go – 5:55
8. Don't Be Eyeballin' My Po'Boy, Boy – 4:25
9. Job Boss – 3:25
10. All These Fishies Swimmin' Through My Head – 4:19
