= Chris and Ciara =

- The iTunes cover art of Chris and Ciara
- Other names: Bottom of the Barrel
- Genre: Talk and music
- Running time: 2 hours (11:00 am – 1:00 pm)
- Country of origin: Republic of Ireland
- Language: English
- Home station: RTÉ 2fm
- Hosted by: Chris Greene; Ciara King
- Produced by: Zbyszek Zalinski
- Recording studio: RTÉ Radio Centre
- Original release: 2 March 2014
- Opening theme: "Talk Like That" by The Presets
- Ending theme: "Amhrán na bhFiann"
- Website: RTÉ 2fm homepage

Chris and Ciara, formerly titled Bottom of the Barrel, is an Irish radio show on RTÉ 2fm hosted by Chris Greene and Ciara King. It is broadcast on Saturday and Sunday starting at 11am (previously Sunday-Thursday from 10pm), and consists of contemporary hits and comedic pop culture-focused talk segments. The show features film and celebrity news quizzes and a "Rap Off" in which Greene and King compete, as well as interviews and guests such as 2fm's Emma Power and DJ Mo K, Brian M. Lloyd from entertainment.ie, Blindboy Boatclub of The Rubberbandits, and the self-styled dating expert the Galway Player. King reads from her teenage diary every Wednesday, and the presenters often read text messages and tweets sent by listeners.

The show was introduced in March 2014 after its presenters left iRadio, as part of a reorganisation of 2fm by the head of the station, Dan Healy. The programme has been praised for its irreverence and the chemistry between its presenters, but also criticised for its gratuitous use of profanity. Its podcasts were selected for iTunes' Best of 2014 list.

== Format ==
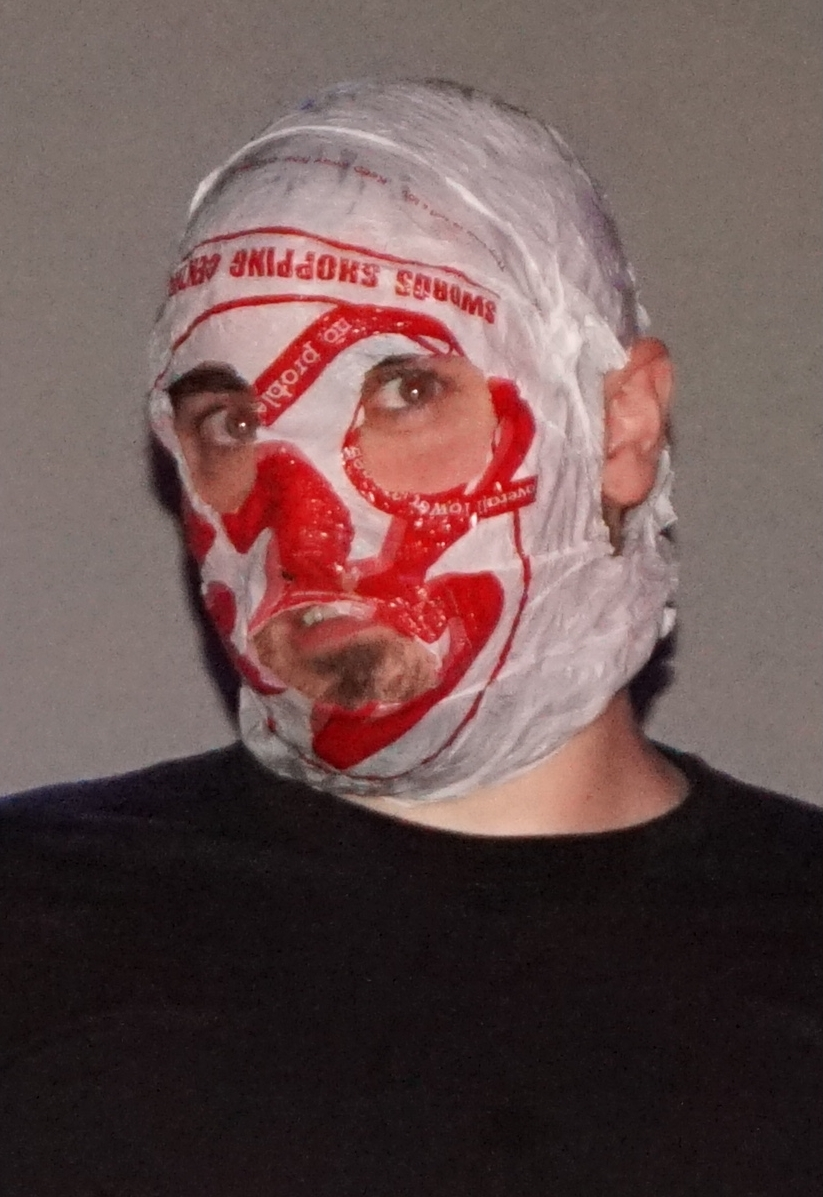
Blindboy Boatclub of The Rubberbandits is featured on the show every Tuesday.

The show is broadcast from Saturday to Sunday, starting at 11 am. It lasts two hours (although it previously lasted three before 8 February 2016), and is interspersed with regular music, news and promotional trails. On Sundays, the talk element of the show consists of clips from previous episodes. Regular features from Monday to Thursday include:

- The Win Back Your License Fee Quiz (Monday and Thursday): A listener must correctly answer ten questions in 60 seconds over the phone – if they are successful, they win back the cost of the Irish television license fee (€160).
- The Rap Off (Monday): Chris and Ciara each record a verse from a popular rap song; listeners must then vote by text and Twitter to decide whose version was best.
- Archives with Aifric (Monday): 2fm's Aifric O'Connell plays clips from the RTÉ Libraries and Archives.
- There I Said It (Monday): Chris and Ciara read out listeners' embarrassing or offensive views or admissions, and sometimes give their own.
- The Fake Celebrity News Quiz (Tuesday): 2fm's Emma Power gives the presenters four pieces of information about celebrities, one of which she has invented. Chris and Ciara each pick the story they think is false; if one of them chooses correctly, he or she wins; otherwise Emma wins.
- Top 5 in other countries (some Tuesdays): Tired of the monotony of Western music, Chris and Ciara listen to the top 5 songs in countries such as Japan, Nigeria and southern India.
- Blindboy Boatclub (Tuesday): Chris and Ciara speak to Blindboy from the group The Rubberbandits about various topics.
- Brian M. Lloyd (Wednesday): The presenters are joined by the film editor from entertainment.ie, who discusses recent movies and gives them a Movie Quiz, in which they must identify dialogue or music from films.
- Ciara's Diary (Wednesday): Ciara King reads entries and poems from her teenage diary.
- Moral Dilemma (Wednesday): Chris and Ciara examine an odd legal or moral issue.
- Jo McNally (Thursday): The agony aunt gives out advice.
- The Galway Player (Thursday): The self-styled male dating expert from Galway gives the presenters tips, which often annoy Ciara due to their laddish nature.

=== Retired segments ===
- Michael Murphy (formerly Tuesday): The psychoanalyst comes on to interpret the dreams of listeners.
- DJ Mo K (formerly Thursday): The 2fm DJ speaks to Chris and Ciara about the world of rap.
- What Are You Doing Awake? (Monday to Thursday): Every show, except on Sundays, used to end with Chris and Ciara reading texts about what the Irish public is doing awake after midnight.

== Background ==
The presenters met at i105-107FM – where Greene had worked since 2007, and King since 2008 – when Greene covered for a presenter who was ill for a week. The pair hosted the programme The Third i, broadcast on weekdays from 1 to 4 pm, and repeated from 1 to 4 am – the station's website said The Third i was "about nothing. Even fans of the show openly admit it is pointless and goes nowhere". The station merged with its sister station i102-104FM to form iRadio; they hosted its programme The Cracked i from 2011. The Cracked i was described by the station as "extreme, unpredictable, random radio", and was broadcast between 9:50 pm and 12:50 pm on weeknights. In April 2013, iRadio founder Dan Healy was appointed the head of RTÉ 2fm, a station which had suffered a falling audience share since the death of presenter Gerry Ryan in 2010; Healy has said that "When Gerry Ryan passed away, so did 2fm". According to Una Mullally of The Irish Times, 2fm "abandoned its youth audience" by importing presenters who had "passed their prime". Healy radically changed the station's programming and music, introducing shows such as Breakfast Republic, The Nicky Byrne Show and The Early, Early Breakfast Show with Lottie Ryan. As part of this reshuffle, Greene and King left iRadio in order to host a late-night show on 2fm, although Greene joked that they would be "focusing on a career in pornography".

== Impact ==
=== Critical reception ===
Una Mullally of The Irish Times described how "Bottom of the Barrel brought me back to some of my favourite radio shows, shows where you felt there was a real connection between both the people in studio and the presenters with their audience", comparing it to Sara Cox on The Radio 1 Breakfast Show and Rick O'Shea. She said that the show "is making me listen to 2fm again" and that "[Greene and King's] chemistry is fantastic, their references and asides are brilliant [and] their indignant outsiderness is hilarious". The Sunday Independent's Eilis O'Hanlon described the programme as "far more entertaining" than Breakfast Republic, 2fm's breakfast show. Writing for JOE.ie, Joe Harrington described Chris and Ciara's podcasts as "weird, clever, current and very funny".

However, The Herald's John Byrne criticised the show's use of profanity, describing it as "a steady stream of boob, knob and masturbation jokes". Comparing it to Breakfast Republic, Byrne said that "Bottom of the Barrel is clearly keen to sell itself as a rude, rambling and anarchic alternative to the polished and 'professional' offerings found on other parts of the dial". He also criticised the presenters' "drearily predictable gender dynamic", saying that "Greene was free to be the wacky and provocative male, while King was frequently relegated to the role of a 'responsible', tut-tutting and disapproving ... female sidekick." Despite this, Byrne noted that the show contained some of the "playfulness and irreverence that Irish radio sorely needs far more of". When Greene and King stood in for Ryan Tubridy's daytime show during his stint at BBC Radio 2, the Irish Independent reported that some listeners "were less than impressed" and "have accused the broadcaster of isolating older audiences".

=== Awards ===
Chris and Ciara's podcasts were selected for the Best of 2014 list by iTunes, who said "Never taking themselves too seriously, this night time comedy duo can deftly slip from an impromptu rap-off into reciting hilarious teen poetry. We enjoy their talent and ability to capture the buzz of now." Dan Healy described iTunes as "people whose job it is to listen to and recognise great radio" and praised it for allowing Greene and King to reach "an even wider audience". The programme won Best Irish Radio Show at entertainment.ie's annual Erics Awards on 29 January 2015.

=== Ratings ===
In April 2015, audience figures showed that Chris and Ciara had 12,000 daily listeners, an increase of 2000 since the previous quarter. By July 2015, this had increased to 14,000.
