= AU (band) =

American musician

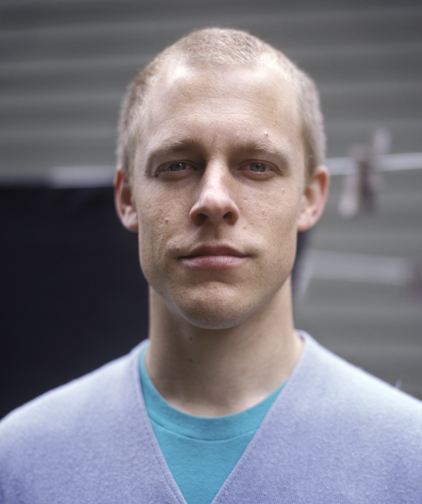
Luke Wyland, Portland, OR 2008

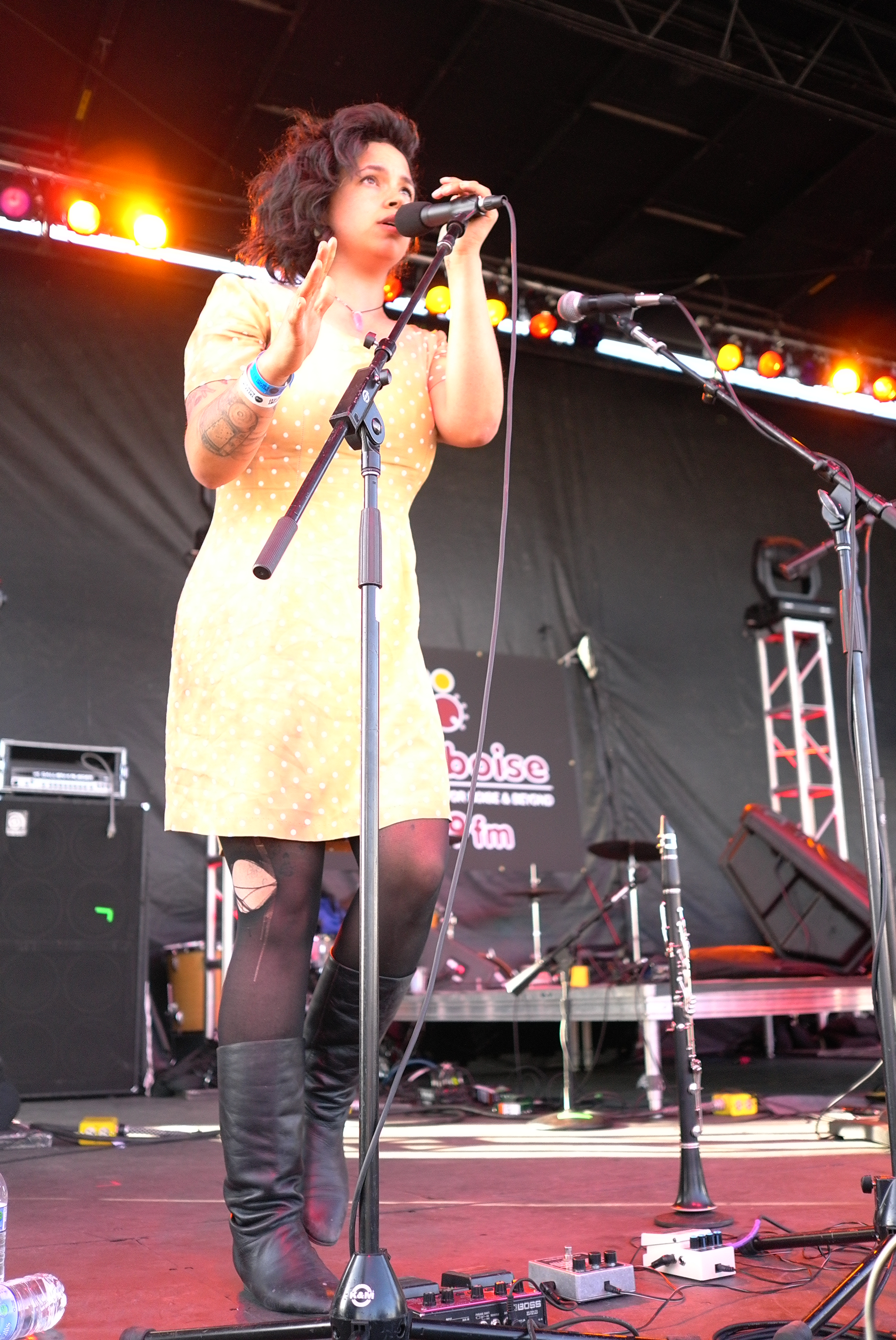
AU in its 2012 incarnation at the Treefort Music Fest in Boise, Idaho

AU was a Portland, Oregon experimental pop group established by multi-instrumentalist Luke Wyland. Wyland started AU in 2005 while completing a degree at the Massachusetts College of Art. He later moved cross-country to Portland and established a base in its music community. Now a working live band, AU features an ever-changing roster of players, recently including Jonathan Sielaff (Parenthetical Girls, Nick Jaina) on guitar, clarinets and saw; and Dana Valatka (Mustaphamond) on drums. Contributors to AU's recordings included Mark Kaylor (Hamor of Hathor, CexFucx), Becky Dawson (Saw Whet, Ah Holly Fam'ly), and Sarah Winchester (A Weather).

Its self-titled debut album was praised by such media centers as Pitchfork and Stereogum, and was named #2 Portland Album of 2007 by The Portland Mercury, which said AU "manages to erase the high art/low art boundary between American contemporary classical music and American pop music, blending them into a simple, compelling, verse-chorus celebration... (and) is the rare band that can reinvent its songs live and still manage to match their recorded quality."

Wyland has recorded, produced and released 4 recordings as AU. AU - Au (2007). AU - Verbs (2008). AU - Versions (2009). AU - Both Lights (2012).

== Discography ==
Albums

- peaofthesea (2005) as "luc"
- Au (2007)
- Verbs (2008)
- Versions (2009)
- Both Lights (2012)

Singles

- "RR vs. D" (2008)
- "Solid Gold" (2012)
