= Reckless (Tilly and the Wall song) =

"Reckless" is the fifth song off the album, Wild Like Children by Omaha, Nebraska-based band, Tilly and the Wall. It was released as a limited edition 7" on Trash Aesthetics on February 6, 2006.

== Track listing ==
1. "Reckless"
2. "In Two Glasses of Wine"
3. "Pictures of Houses"
