= Mars Black =

Mars Black may refer to:

- Mars Black (artist), hip hop artist from Brooklyn, New York
- Mars Black (pigment), an iron oxide pigment
