= That Remix Sucks =

EP by Tilly and the Wall
- Released: 2009
- Length: 31:02
- Label: Team Love Records

That Remix Sucks is a remix EP of Tilly and the Wall songs, released as a digital download in 2009 from Team Love Library.

== Track listing ==
1. Beat Control (La La Lepus Remix) – 7:14
2. The Freest Man (CSS Remix) – 5:05
3. Bad Education (No Context Remix) – 9:13
4. Beat Control (James Yuill Remix) – 4:37
5. Beat Control (Tom Knight Remix) – 4:55
