= Chris Greene (broadcaster) =

Irish broadcaster and comedian (born 1988)

- Born: Christopher Greene; 13 February 1988 (age 38); Connemara, County Galway, Ireland
- Occupations: Broadcaster, comedian

Christopher Greene (born 13 February 1988) is an Irish broadcaster and comedian. He stars with Peter Ganley in the series Craic Addicts, produced for Channel 4's on-demand service 4oD. Previously, he hosted the radio show Chris and Ciara on RTÉ 2fm with Ciara King from when the pair left iRadio in 2014, till the show ended in March 2022. The end of his show with RTÉ was subject to a dispute at the Workplace Relations Commission.

== Broadcasting career ==
Radio

Greene began his broadcasting career on college radio station Flirt FM in 2005 at 17 years of age and moved to commercial radio station iRadio in 2007. Chris was the youngest person to be selected from a nationwide talent search of over 400 applicants for on air personalities.

Presenting both night and daytime slots on regional station iRadio with Ciara King, the pair developed a loyal and considerable following. This led to the duo being headhunted in 2014 to form part of the new schedule for national station RTÉ 2fm.

Following the show's cancellation, Greene claimed he was punished as a whistleblower and later fired by RTÉ after raising charges of sexual harassment in the workplace. Greene then protested to the authorities about his employment situation.

Speaking at the WRC, his attorney stated that Greene had expressed concerns to 2FM chief Dan Healy about "alleged sexual harassment and impropriety in the workplace". However, it was argued that Greene had been penalized by being marginalised at work previous to his departure.

However, when the case came before the Workplace Relations Commission (WRC) on 20 February 2024, it was delayed for about two and a half hours as the parties and their lawyers talked. As a result, Greene settled and agreed to remove his whistleblower penalisation and unjust dismissal allegations against RTÉ.

Television/ On Demand video content

While working in iRadio, Chris met fellow broadcaster/ entertainer Peter Ganley. In 2011, Peter founded production company Final Boss Media, Chris joined him shortly after and to date the company continues to work with some sizable clients, producing video content for Paddy Power, Yahoo, RTÉ Two, TV3 and Channel 4 as well as a YouTube channel, Epic News with Peter and Chris with over 10 million views.
