= O (Tilly and the Wall album) =

o

Studio album by Tilly and the Wall
- Released: June 17, 2008
- Recorded: December 2007
- Genre: Indie pop, indie rock
- Label: Team Love Records
- Producer: Mike Mogis

Tilly and the Wall chronology
Bottoms of Barrels (2006)	o (2008)	Heavy Mood (2012)

Professional ratings
Review scores
Source	Rating
AllMusic	3/5 stars
Drowned in Sound	8/10
PopMatters	5/10
Pitchfork	7.6/10
WOM magazine	3.5/5 stars

o is Tilly and the Wall's third studio album, released on June 17, 2008, through Team Love Records, and on vinyl on July 22, 2008. The album was engineered and produced by Mike Mogis.

The album was released on August 30, 2008, in Australia by Dew Process.

== Content ==
o was preceded by the Beat Control EP, which featured the title track and "Cacophony". "Beat Control" is not included on the album, although "Cacophony" is. The first single, "Pot Kettle Black", was available to download for free from the band's official website and the Spin website. The music video premiered on Stereogum. "Chandelier Lake" and "Too Excited" were performed at various live shows prior to the album's release, including Daytrotter. The track listings initially announced for o had "Jumbler" as the title for "Alligator Skin".

== Title and artwork ==
The album's track listing and release date was announced on March 21, 2008. However, the album was untitled. Tilly and the Wall leaned towards naming the album o, due to its oval-shaped frame for the artwork. The album's title was officially confirmed as o on May 6, when the band posted pre-order information on their official website. The oval-shaped frames include fan-submitted artwork and handmade prints by various artists.

== Track listing ==
All tracks by Tilly and the Wall.

1. "Tall Tall Grass" – 2:57
2. "Pot Kettle Black" – 2:50
3. "Cacophony" – 2:27
4. "I Found You" – 2:36
5. "Alligator Skin" – 2:20
6. "Chandelier Lake" – 4:16
7. "Dust Me Off" – 2:56
8. "Falling Without Knowing" – 3:05
9. "Poor Man's Ice Cream" – 2:33
10. "Bloodflower" – 3:12
11. "Too Excited" – 3:16
12. "Heartbeats" – 2:58 (bonus track)

The UK edition featured the single Beat Control instead of Heartbeats as a bonus track.

== Additional musicianship and credits ==
- Jill Becker – stomps (2, 9)
- Clark Baechle – programming (8)
- Mason Brown – guitar (1, 6, 11)
- Julia Bryson – stomps (2, 9), group vocals (4, 9, 11)
- Craig Dee – drums (2–4, 6, 7, 10, 11)
- Elsa Fellows – stomps (2, 9), taps (3)
- Tyler Hottovy – trombone (4)
- David Matysiak – guitar (11), group vocals (4, 9, 11)
- Mike Mogis – bass (2, 3, 9, 10), keyboards (2, 4, 6–8), electric guitar (4, 5, 7, 8), talkbox guitar (2, 7), percussion (3, 5, 6, 9), Mellotron (4, 6), bells (5), chimes (6), glockenspiel (9), additional programming (8)
- Dan McCarthy – accordion (9)
- Darci Pressnall – stomps (2, 9)
- Chris Senseney – trumpet (3–5)
- Ian Simons – saxophone (3, 5)
- Nate Walcott – trumpet (7)
- Breanne Wilkinson – stomps (2, 9), taps (3)
- Nik Fackler, Karl Houfek Elle Lien, Branden Rapp, Chris Rivera, Kacynna Tompsett – group vocals (4, 9, 11)

Recorded and produced by Mike Mogis at ARC Studios, December 2007
Engineering assistance by Ian Aeillo
Mastered by Doug Van Sloun at Focus Mastering, February 2008
Layout by Jadon Ulrich
