= Corraveggaun West =

Townland in County Mayo, Ireland

- Townland
- Interactive map of Corraveggaun West
- Coordinates: 54°02′25″N 9°10′47″W
- Country: Ireland
- County: County Mayo
- Civil parish: Ballynahaglish

Corraveggaun West (Irish: Corr Bheagáin Thiar) is a townland in the parish of Ballynahaglish and the barony of Tirawley, County Mayo in Ireland. It is 0.43 square miles in area and borders Corraveggaun East in the east and the village of Knockmore to the south. As of 2011, the population of the townland was 106 people in 35 occupied houses.
