= Simple Love =

Simple Love may refer to:

- Simple Love (album), 2007 album by David Dondero
- "Simple Love", song by Jay Chou from the 2001 album Fantasy
- "Simple Love", song by Mark Feehily from the 2015 album Fire
