= South of the South =

Studio album by David Dondero
- Released: October 25, 2005
- Genre: Folk rock
- Label: Team Love

David Dondero chronology
Live at the Hemlock (2004)	South of the South (2005)	Simple Love (2007)

Professional ratings
Review scores
Source	Rating
Pitchfork Media	(6.5/10)

South of the South is the sixth release by David Dondero. The title is a reference to Florida, where Dondero lived for a time. It was released on October 25, 2005 on the Team Love Records label. It was recorded in December 2004 at Sweatbox Studios in Austin and features guest spots by Eric Bachmann (Crooked Fingers), Miranda Brown, Mike Vasquez, Tom Heyman, Dan Carr and Chris Heinrich.

This album is the fifth release of Team Love Records.

== Track listing ==
1. "South of the South" - 5:09
2. "I've Seen the Love" - 4:02
3. "Journal Burning Party" - 3:52
4. "Let Go the Past" - 3:38
5. "Summertime Suicide #1" - 2:34
6. "Brownsville Revival" - 3:03
7. "The One that Fell from the Vine" - 4:19
8. "Persevere" - 3:38
9. "You Shouldn't Leave a Lover Alone Too Long" - 4:36
10. "Pornographic Love Song" - 4:27
11. "Laying Low in Eli, Nevada" - 5:47
12. "Hwy Death Shrine" - 3:37
13. "Summertime Suicide #2" - 2:31
