= Breakfast with Hector =

- Genre: Comedy, talk
- Running time: 120 minutes (7:00-9:00 am)
- Country of origin: Ireland
- Languages: English, Irish
- Home station: RTÉ 2fm
- Hosted by: Hector Ó hEochagáin
- Produced by: Alan Swan
- Recording studio: Studio 1, RTÉ Galway, Hynes Building, Galway
- Original release: 4 October 2010 – 20 December 2013
- Audio format: FM and Digital radio
- Podcast: Breakfast with Hector

Breakfast with Hector was a breakfast radio programme on RTÉ 2fm in Ireland, presented by Hector Ó hEochagáin from 4 October 2010. It was broadcast at 7:00–9:00 am each weekday from Galway. It was confirmed on 18 December 2013 that Ó hEochagáin would be leaving the show and returning to TV work. The last show was broadcast on Friday, 20 December 2013. The last show ended with I Still Haven't Found What I'm Looking For by U2.

== Show format ==
The show was two hours long, with news and sport reports read half-hourly between 7:00 and 9:00. A typical half-hour segment contained fifteen to twenty minutes of chat, discussing Ó hEochagáin's life, music, popular culture, or listeners' issues. There were regular celebrity guest interviews, with occasional live music performances. The show relied on a number of on-air contributions from background staff, with members of the production team, news and sports readers, and studio guests contributing throughout the show. Whereas most 2FM breakfast shows have been broadcast from Dublin, Breakfast with Hector was based in Galway.

A special Breakfast With Hector night was held at Dublin's Olympia Theatre on 9 March 2012, dubbed an "Elvis Extravaganza" by RTÉ.

== Team members ==
Hector Ó hEochagáin
Host of the show.
Emma Counihan
Regular newsreader.
Louise Herity
Regular sports newsreader, now a regular presenter on 98fm.
Aoife Carragher
AA Roadwatch team leader.
Dan "the Gun" O'Neill
AA Roadwatch announcer.
Alan "Feathers" Swan
The show's producer who frequently interrupts Ó hEochagáin from the background. Alan now produces the Nicky Byrne Show on 2fm.
Ronan Casey
Presenter of the weekly segment, "Medium Sized Town, Fairly Big Story". A book of the same name by Ronan was published in October 2014 by Gill & Macmillan. Ronan is currently part of the Ireland AM team.

== Features ==
How's the Country this Morning?
Listeners ring or text the programme with their stories or problems. Ó hEochagáin accepts telephone calls on air to discuss quirky or off-beat topics such as weird tattoos, how shillelaghs are made and driving incidents.

Medium Sized Town, Fairly Big Story
A weekly segment in which Ronan Casey reports some of the more unusual or funny stories from local newspapers in Ireland.

Evelyn's Word of the Day
A daily segment, usually airing after the 8:30 news headlines, in which newsreader Evelyn McClafferty introduces her word of the day. On Wednesday's Focal na Seachtaine offers listeners a word in the Irish language.

The Birth Notices
A weekly segment, usually airing on Thursdays, where Ó hEochagáin reads out good wishes to new-born babies and their parents.

Class Act
A daily quiz in which two contestants answer general knowledge questions. Winners return each day until they are eliminated.

Where am I?
An occasional quiz in which Ó hEochagáin tries to discover the Irish provenance of callers by asking them a maximum of ten questions.

Everything you wanted to know about the weekend, but didn't really delve into...
A weekly segment in which Bernard O'Shea (now the host of the 2FM breakfast show himself) reports on some of the bigger news stories from the weekend.

My Automobile Association
Listeners rang and texted the programme with their road traffic tips.

What Class of Vehicle is She?
A phone-in quiz in which Ó hEochagáin played a short audio clip of a car or tractor starting up. Listeners tried to guess what the vehicle was.

What Class of a Dog is She?
A variation on the "What Class of a Vehicle is She?" segment. A phone-in quiz in which Ó hEochagáin played a short audio clip of a dog barking. Listeners tried to guess the dog's breed.

Preceded by The Colm & Jim-Jim Breakfast Show	RTÉ 2fm's breakfast show 2010 – 2013	Succeeded by Breakfast Republic
