= Heavy Mood =

Studio album by Tilly and the Wall
- Released: October 2, 2012
- Genre: Indie pop, indie rock
- Length: 36:36
- Label: Team Love Records
- Producer: Mike Mogis

Tilly and the Wall chronology
o (2008)	Heavy Mood (2012)

Professional ratings
Aggregate scores
Source	Rating
Metacritic	62/100
Review scores
Source	Rating
Allmusic	3/5 stars
Pitchfork Media	5.9
This Is Fake DIY	5/10

Heavy Mood is the fourth studio album by American indie pop group Tilly and the Wall. It was released in October 2012 under Team Love Records, and produced by Mike Mogis.

== Track listing ==
All tracks are written by Tilly and the Wall.

No.	Title	Length
1.	"Love Riot"	3:09
2.	"Heavy Mood"	3:14
3.	"All Kinds of Guns"	3:31
4.	"Static Expressions"	2:56
5.	"Thicker Than Thieves"	3:06
6.	"Hey Rainbow"	2:41
7.	"I Believe in You"	5:43
8.	"Echo My Love"	4:02
9.	"Youth"	3:36
10.	"Defenders"	4:38
