= Jokerman: Tommy Tiernan in America =

Jokerman Tommy Tiernan in America

Video by Tommy Tiernan
- Released: November 2006
- Recorded: 2005–2006
- Length: 70 Minutes Approx

Tommy Tiernan chronology
Tommy Tiernan:Loose	Jokerman Tommy Tiernan in America	Tommy Tiernan:OK Baby

Jokerman: Tommy Tiernan in America is the fourth DVD release from Tommy Tiernan and was filmed over a 2-year period. It follows Tommy's attempt to be successful in America. It was filmed in comedy clubs in New York City, Washington, D.C., and other places from Omaha to Sacramento. The material was gathered from Tiernan's diverse experiences, both positive and negative, and various people and cultures encountered over the years.

== DVD track list ==
1. Lonely in New York
2. Clubtown California
3. Montreal
4. You don't need to curse in order to be funny
5. Vastland
6. I love guns
7. Where'd everyone go ?
8. The late show

== Bonus features ==
1. Irish gala 2006 (Filmed at Just for Laughs, The Montreal Comedy Festival)
2. Full New York club gig
3. 10 years of Tommy on the late late show
4. weblink
