= David Dondero =

American singer-songwriter (born 1969)

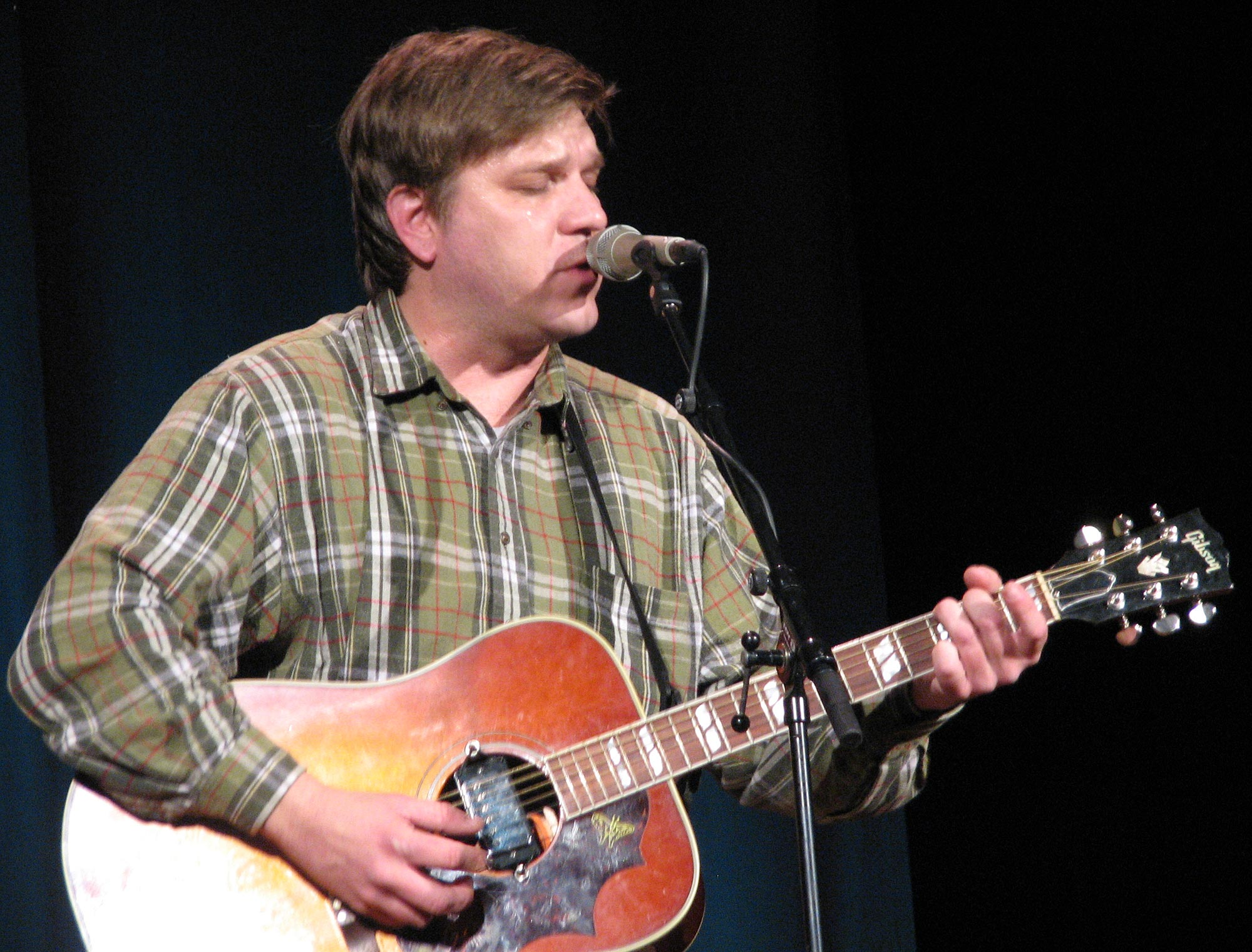
- Dondero in Örebro, Sweden in 2008

Background information
- Born: 24 June 1969 (age 56)
- Origin: Duluth, Minnesota, United States
- Genres: Indie folk
- Occupation: Singer-songwriter
- Years active: 1979–present
- Labels: Ghostmeat Records, Future Farmer Records, Team Love, Flippin Yeah Industries, Unrequited Records
- Website: davedondero.com

David Dondero (born 24 June 1969 in Duluth, Minnesota, United States) is an American singer-songwriter and guitarist. In 2006, NPR's All Songs Considered named David one of the "best living songwriters" alongside Bob Dylan, Paul McCartney and Tom Waits.

== Music career ==
Dondero started his musical career on drums at the age of nine, due in part to the fact that he "was always drumming on stuff with my hands". Dondero released four records with the Clemson, South Carolina–based punk/hardcore band Sunbrain (three on Grass Records and one on Ghostmeat Records), before breaking up in 1995. The following year, Dondero joined This Bike Is A Pipe Bomb for nearly two years as their drummer. He left in 1998 to focus on his solo material. He has since released fourteen solo albums – four with Ghostmeat Records, three with Future Farmer Records two with Team Love Records, and the last five have been self released. His latest album, titled Immersion Therapy, was released in August 2023.

Dondero has toured with such acts as Crooked Fingers, Jolie Holland, Against Me!, The Mountain Goats, David Bazan, Preston School of Industry, Bright Eyes, Tilly and the Wall, Erik Petersen of Mischief Brew, Spoon, and Willy Mason.

== Discography ==
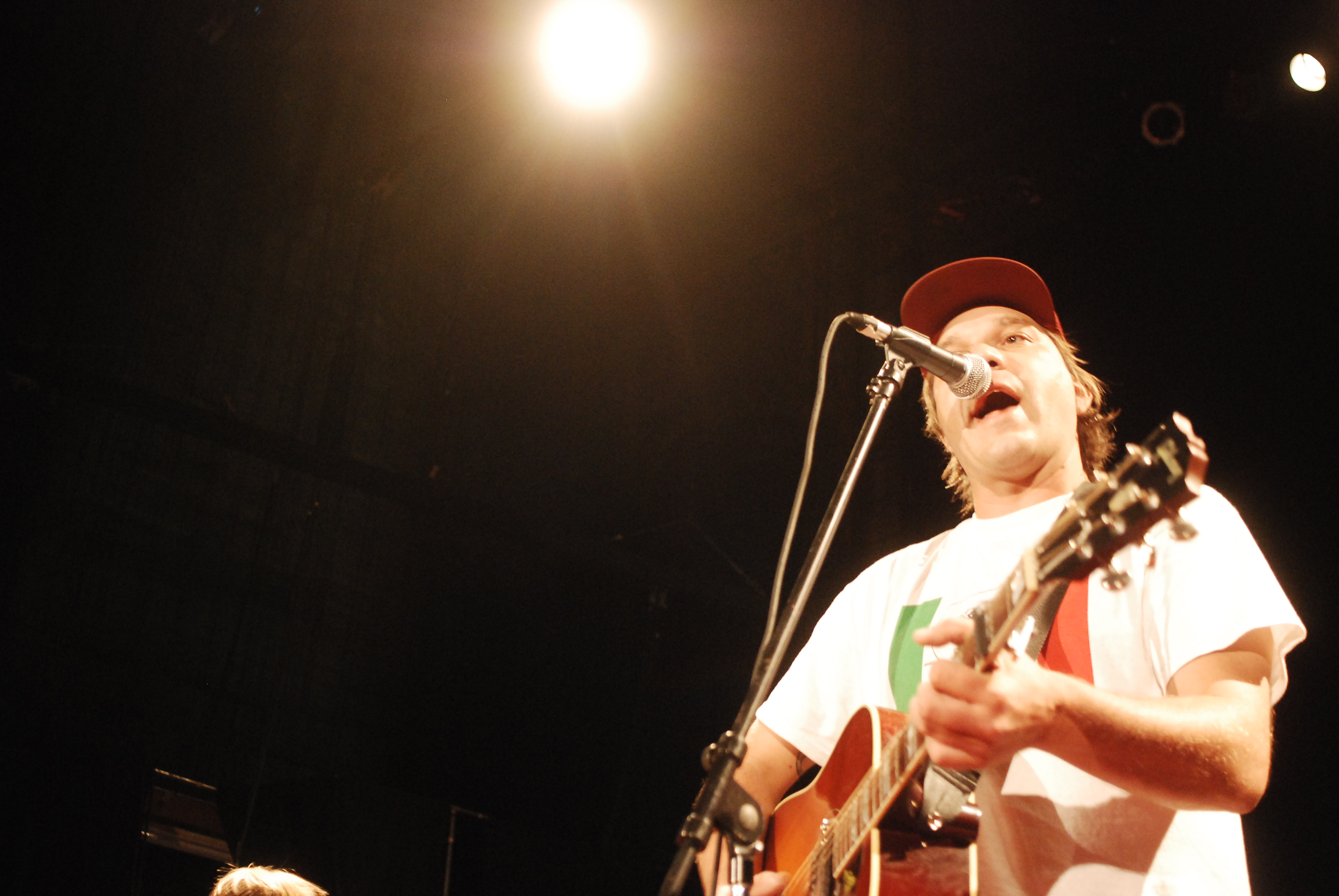
Dondero performing

=== Albums ===
- The Pity Party – (1999 · Ghostmeat Records)
- Spider West Myshkin and a City Bus (out of print) – (2000 · Ghostmeat Records)
- Shooting at the Sun with a Water Gun – (2000 · Future Farmer Records)
- The Transient – (2002 · Future Farmer Records)
- Spider West Myshkin and a City Bus (re-issue) – (2003 · Ghostmeat Records)
- Live at the Hemlock – (2004 · Future Farmer Records)
- South of the South – (2005 · Team Love)
- Simple Love – (2007 · Team Love)
- # Zero with a Bullet – (2010 · Team Love)
- A Pre-existing Condition – (2011 · Ghostmeat Records)
- This Guitar – (2013)
- Golden Hits vol. 1 – (2013)
- Inside the Cats Eye – (2017)
- The Filter Bubble Blues – (2020)
- Immersion Therapy – (2023)

=== Splits ===
- "David Dondero/Chris Terry" – (2003 · Perpetual Motion Machine)
- "David Dondero/Mischief Brew" – "Two Boxcars" (2005 · Fistolo Records)
- "David Dondero/Pine Hill Haints"; Arkam Records

=== Compilations ===
- Ghostmeat 5th Anniversary 1994–1999 (song: "Leave the Driving to Them")
- Parts – Ghostmeat Records Compilation (as part of the band: sunbrain. Song: "Something Wrong")

== Published Works ==
- Chaos The Cat (July 25, 2024). David Dondero. ISBN 9798988616108. 322 pages.
