= Simple Love (album) =

Studio album by David Dondero
- Released: August 24, 2007
- Genre: Folk rock
- Length: 49:03
- Label: Team Love
- Producer: Mike Vasquez

David Dondero chronology
South of the South (2005)	Simple Love (2007)	# Zero with a Bullet (2010)

Professional ratings
Review scores
Source	Rating
Pitchfork Media	7.0/10

Simple Love is the seventh album by American folk rock musician David Dondero, released on August 24, 2007, by Team Love Records. It came two years after his first release with Team Love, South of the South.

== Track listing ==
1. The Prince William Sound
2. When the Heart Breaks Deep
3. Rothko Chapel
4. Stuck on the Moon
5. Simple Love
6. You Don't Love Anyone
7. Mighty Mississip!
8. One Legged Man and the Three Legged Dog
9. Lone Rose
10. Double Murder Ballad Suicide

== Music videos ==
- Rothko Chapel directed and animated by Alexandra Valenti and Holly Bronko
