= Yours Are the Only Ears =

American musician

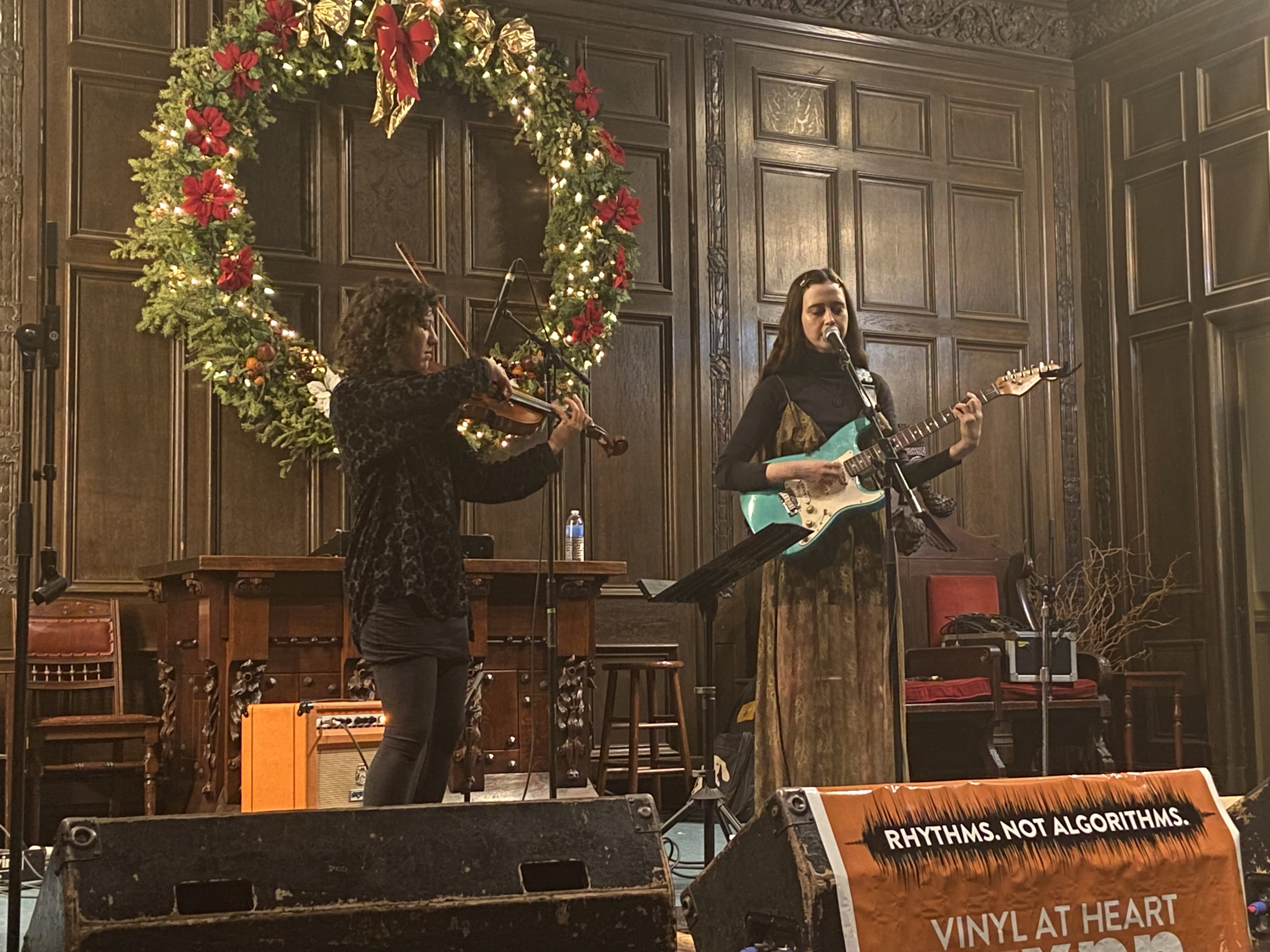
- Cutler (right) performing as Yours Are the Only Ears in 2022

Background information
- Origin: Brooklyn, New York
- Genres: Folk, indie pop
- Years active: 2018–Present
- Label: Team Love

Yours Are the Only Ears (stylized in start case) is the stage name of New York musician Susannah Cutler.

== Early life ==
Cutler grew up in New York. Her parents were both musicians, with her father a blues musician and her mother a country musician. Cutler studied both visual arts and textile design in school.

== Career ==
Cutler released her first album under the moniker Yours Are the Only Ears in 2018, titled Knock Hard, after having signed with Team Love Records. In addition to making music, Cutler is also a textile designer.

== Discography ==
=== Studio albums ===
- Knock Hard (2018, Team Love)
- We Know The Sky (2023, Lame-O)
