= Trash Aesthetics =

Trash Aesthetics

Trash Aesthetics is a British independent record label founded in 2004 by Rob Fawkes and Claire Hewitson and active until 2014. Based in South London, it specialised in releasing limited-edition runs of singles by both local bands and international acts whose work is difficult to come by in the UK. Having started helping Rob and Claire with the label in 2007, Adam Killip took over running Trash Aesthetics in 2010.

TA701 (The label's first release) was a 480 copy 7" clear-vinyl pressing by Bloc Party called "She's Hearing Voices" which was released to critical acclaim, with BBC Radio 1 DJ Steve Lamacq labelling the track "genius". This was followed the same year with another limited single called 22 Grand Job, this time by The Rakes which was met with similar enthusiasm in the music press.

2005 saw the release of more limited 7"s by Omaha, Nebraska tap dancing indie troop Tilly and the Wall (signed to Conor Oberst's Team Love label in the US) and Brixton based country / power-pop 5 piece The Tailors. That year also saw the release of a 10" EP by Los Angeles-based three-piece Bedtime for Toys who went on to work with artists such as Har Mar Superstar and Le Tigre.

The label released The Tailors successful debut album Wakey Wakey in 2007 as well as an extremely limited 7" single by Projections (a side project of the band Blood Red Shoes) and Luke Abbott.

2009 saw the release of two more 7" singles by Mi Mye and Richmond Fontaine.

== Releases ==
2004

- TA701 Bloc Party – She's Hearing Voices
- TA702 The Rakes – 22 Grand Job

2005

- TA703 The Tailors – A New Hairdo
- TA704 Tilly and the Wall – You and I Misbehaving
- TA1001 Bedtime For Toys EP

2006

- TA705 Projections / Luke Abbott – Muted / Repus Tekram

2007

- TACD01 The Tailors – Wakey Wakey
- TACD02 The Tailors – Come Dig Me Up

2009

- TA706 Mi Mye – The Last
- TA707 Richmond Fontaine – You Can Move Back Here

2010

- TACD03 Treecreeper – Juniper

2011

- TA708 Richmond Fontaine – Lost in the Trees
- TA709 H Hawkline / My Sad Captains – You Say You Love Me / Little Joanne
- TA710 Chuck Prophet – The Left Hand and the Right Hand

2012

- TA711 Mark Eitzel / Sacri Cuori (featuring Isobel Campbell)
- TA1202 H Hawkline – Black Domino Box

== See also ==
- List of record labels
- List of independent UK record labels
