= Woo! =

EP by Tilly and the Wall
- Released: 2003
- Studio: Conor Oberst's basement studio
- Genre: Indie rock
- Length: 19:41

Tilly and the Wall chronology
Woo! (2003)	Tilly and the Wall (2003)

Woo! is the first release by Omaha, Nebraska-based band Tilly and the Wall. It was self-released in 2003 with 6 songs, recorded in Conor Oberst's basement studio.

== Track listing ==
1. "I Can't Believe You" – 2:56
2. "Shake Shake" – 4:03
3. "Do You Dream at All" – 2:29
4. "In Bed All Day" – 4:02
5. "Pictures of Houses" – 2:41
6. "Sad for Days" – 3:30
