= Bedtime for Toys =

- Origin: United States
- Genres: Dance-punk; Pop; R&B
- Years active: ? – present
- Labels: Trash Aesthetics (UK/Japan); Fresh Labs/Cogito (United States)
- Members: Marchelle Bradanini; Sammy JC; Toussaint Christophe; Kenan Moore; Nashii Noramly
- Past members: Paul Allen; Jim Chaney; Jenni Tarma
- Website: http://bedtimefortoys.com/

Bedtime for Toys is an American electro-funk band from the Koreatown area of Los Angeles, California, United States.

== Musical style and band members ==
URB Magazine described Bedtime for Toys as a "celestial hybrid of electro, hip hop, pop and metal". The NME called them "the hipsters The Black Eyed Peas" Big Stereo Blog said "Bedtime for Toys feels like something Gwen Stefani would be doing if she was actually interesting", It's The Money Shot blog said that the band "trot on a futuristic rock ann roll wonderland that hasn't been stepped on since the glory days of Prince and the Revolution and The Denver Post said, "If Heavy D and Deborah Harry ever collaborated during their respective heydays, the result would have been something akin to Bedtime for Toys.” The band's name is also the name of a Stevie Wonder Christmas song.

Marchelle Bradanini is the front woman of the group whose background in both politics and partying influence her provocative lyrics. Toussaint Christophe plays keyboards and Sammy JC plays guitar. Together, Toussaint and Sammy produce the band's music and are collectively known as The Bash Brothers. The Bash Brothers have also remixed tracks by artists such as Nelly Furtado, Kelis, Wolfmother, and Fat Joe. Kenan Moore is the band's versatile drummer and also the son of Greg "G-Mo" Moore, the guitar player of Earth, Wind, & Fire. Nashii Noramly, who plays bass, was born in Malaysia, raised in Scotland and was previously of the band F.O. Machete. Nashii is also related to bestselling fantasy author Glenda Larke. Bedtime for Toys also occasionally performs with a live video projection artist, VJ Phi Phenom.

== Activity ==
After releasing several EPs on their own imprint, Cogito Records, Bedtime for Toys released a self-titled EP on the London-based tastemaker label, Trash Aesthetics, which also launched the careers of The Rakes and Bloc Party. Their following EP, entitled R!OT, features guest vocals from Har Mar Superstar and includes bonus remixes by Le Tigre, DJs Are Not Rock Stars, and Spank Rock. The band has performed live with such artists as Diplo, Kid Sister, Moving Units, Har Mar Superstar, Lady Sovereign and Princess Superstar. Their song, "Mona Lisa, Pt.2", interpolates the Tom Tom Club song, 'Genius of Love', and was sanctioned by the original writers, Tina Weymouth and Chris Franz of Tom Tom Club and Talking Heads.

Bedtime for Toys are currently working on material for a new EP, entitled "BFT iz Punk n' B", which will feature cover songs of R&B artists Bobby Brown, Earth, Wind & Fire, Sheila E., and Chaka Khan. The band is recording at their home studio, Fresh Labs, and well as at Hangar 1018, an art gallery and warehouse, in the Downtown Los Angeles Toy District.

== Rolling Stone Award ==
In December 2006, Bedtime for Toys was selected by Rolling Stone Magazine as one of the 2006 Top 25 Bands on MySpace.
