= The Other Side of Immigration =

- Movie poster
- Directed by: Roy Germano
- Produced by: Roy Germano
- Edited by: Roy Germano
- Music by: My Morning Jacket; Bright Eyes; Conor Oberst and the Mystic Valley Band; Cuarteto Latinoamericano
- Production company: Roy Germano Films
- Distributed by: Team Love Records
- Release dates: April 2009 (Las Vegas International Film Festival); October 25, 2010 (DVD)
- Running time: 55 minutes
- Country: United States
- Languages: English; Spanish

The Other Side of Immigration is a 2009 documentary film directed by Roy Germano. It explores why so many people leave the Mexican countryside to work in the United States and what happens to the families and communities they leave behind. The film is based on Germano's interviews with over 700 households in Mexico, which he carried out while doing Ph.D. research on remittances at the University of Texas at Austin. The Other Side of Immigration was distributed on DVD by Team Love Records, a company founded by musician Conor Oberst. On September 6, 2019, Roy Germano and Team Love released The Other Side of Immigration in full on Germano's YouTube channel. Roy Germano teaches International Relations at New York University and is the author of a book about remittances called Outsourcing Welfare. Germano is also a Senior Research Scholar at the New York University School of Law.

== Synopsis ==
The Other Side of Immigration is based on interviews with people in Mexican towns where up to half of the population has gone to work in the United States. The first half of the film looks at the social, economic, and political causes of migration from Mexico to the US. The second half of the film looks at the impact of remittances in Mexican communities and the effects of emigration on families. The film concludes with discussion of guest worker programs and other solutions to illegal migration.

The film features music by Conor Oberst and the Mystic Valley Band, Bright Eyes, My Morning Jacket, and Cuarteto Latinoamericano.

== Reception ==
The Other Side of Immigration has been reviewed positively by various bloggers, educators, and news websites.

- David Neiwert of Crooks and Liars called The Other Side of Immigration “a must-see for anyone serious about the subject.”
- Blogger Lisa Derrick of FireDogLake.com called the film a “beautifully shot documentary” that “shows the human side of immigration.”
- The blog Filmsweep said the film “packs more in its short running time than some docs do in twice its length.”
- Princeton University professor and immigration researcher Douglas Massey said that The Other Side of Immigration “…does more than any other work to give people otherwise disparaged as 'threatening' and 'illegal' a human face...”.
- The Huffington Post listed The Other Side of Immigration as one of "11 Documentaries About Immigrants Everyone Should Watch Right Now."
- The New York Public Library recommends The Other Side of Immigration on its list of "Films to Celebrate Immigrant Heritage Month."
- The Other Side of Immigration was listed as the "Best Documentary" on The Hill's list of "The 11 best civil rights movies of all time."
- Bustle listed The Other Side of Immigration as one of "12 Documentaries About Immigrants That'll Educate and Affect You."

== Awards & Screenings ==
The Other Side of Immigration was one of fifteen films on the American Library Association's 2011 list of Notable Video for Adults. It was an Official Selection at numerous film festivals, including the San Antonio Film Festival, the Global Peace Film Festival, and the Washington Immigration Film Festival. Screenings and discussions of The Other Side of Immigration have occurred at numerous universities, including Princeton University, the University of Chicago, Georgetown University, Fordham University, the University of Michigan, Temple University, Texas State University, Arizona State University, Indiana University, and Cornell University. Screenings and discussions of The Other Side of Immigration have also occurred at public libraries, houses of worship, and community centers throughout the United States.

== Border Fence Video ==
In December 2010, Roy Germano released footage of two women climbing the US-Mexico border fence as a promotional video for The Other Side of Immigration. The video attracted international press attention and debate about the fence project. In interviews and on his blog, Germano has suggested that money spent on the US-Mexico border fence would be better invested in guest worker programs, programs that help immigrants integrate and learn English, and poverty reduction in Mexico.
