= A Pre-existing Condition =

Studio album by David Dondero
- Released: February 22, 2011
- Recorded: 2010
- Genre: Folk rock, indie rock, country rock, singer-songwriter
- Length: 38:05
- Label: Ghostmeat

David Dondero chronology
# Zero With a Bullet (2010)	A Pre-existing Condition (2011)	This Guitar (2013)

Professional ratings
Review scores
Source	Rating
Pitchfork Media	6.0/10
Popmatters	7/10

A Pre-existing Condition is the ninth album by American folk rock musician David Dondero, released on February 22, 2011 by Ghostmeat Records. It came eight years after his third release with Ghostmeat, Spider West Myshkin and a City Bus.

== Track listing ==
1. Willin' – 2:14
2. Not Everybody Loves Your Doggie Like You Do – 2:41
3. Freight Train – 2:01
4. Kiss An Angel Good Mornin' – 2:47
5. Don't Cry No Tears – 2:38
6. Please Hand Me Over to the Undertaker 3:37
7. Pretty Boy Floyd – 3:46
8. (Is Anybody Going To) San Antone – 2:47
9. Boxcar – 2:00
10. Song For Buck Owens – 2:23
11. Let Me Die in My Footsteps – 3:41
12. T For Texas – 2:59
13. A Pre-Existing Condition – 4:31
