= The Lowest Pair =

US-based folk band

- Origin: Olympia, Washington / Minneapolis, Minnesota
- Genres: Folk music; folk rock; indie folk; bluegrass; Americana
- Years active: 2013–present
- Label: Team Love Records
- Members: Kendl Winter; Palmer T. Lee
- Website: thelowestpair.com

The Lowest Pair is an American folk band consisting of dual banjoists, Kendl Winter and Palmer T. Lee. Formed in 2013, the band takes its name from the poem by musician, John Hartford. The band is signed to Team Love Records, Delicata Records and Shuga Records.

== Discography ==
- 36¢ (2014)
- The Sacred Heart Sessions (2015)
- I Reckon I'm Fixin' on Kickin' Round to Pick a Little (2015)
- Uncertain as It Is Uneven (2016)
- Fern Girl And Ice Man (2016)
- The Perfect Plan (2020)
- Horse Camp (2022)
- Always As Young As We'll Ever Be (2026)
