= Shana Falana =

American shoegaze band

- Origin: Hudson Valley, New York
- Genres: Psychedelic pop - Dream pop
- Years active: 1995–present
- Labels: Team Love Records and Arrowhawk Records
- Members: Shana Falana; Michael Amari
- Website: shanafalana.com and thegoddessparty.org/

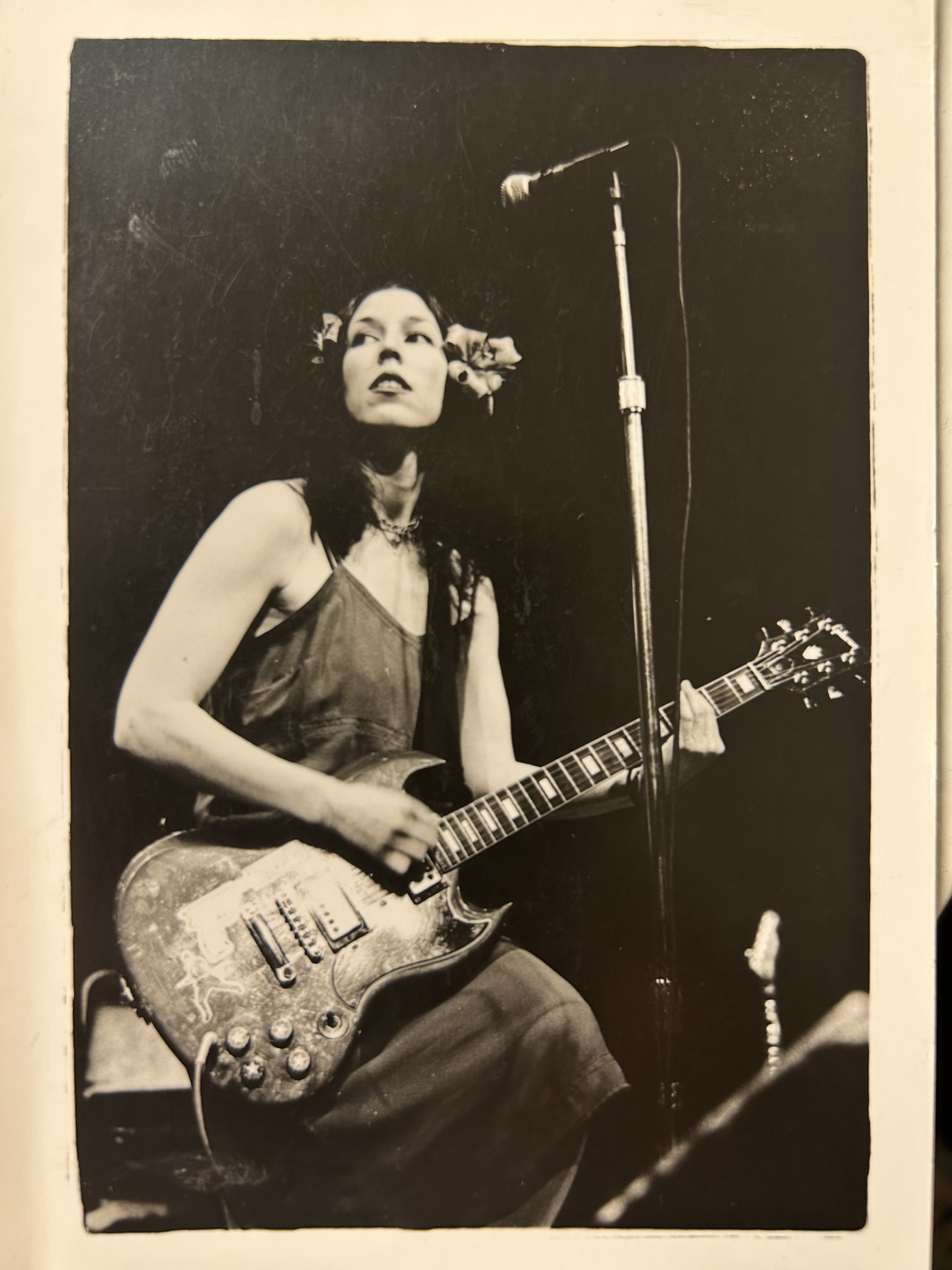
Falana in 1998

Shana Falana is an American psych-dream pop band currently based in the Hudson Valley, New York. They are signed to Team Love and Arrowhawk Records. The band consists of musicians Shana Falana and Michael Amari.

== History ==
Falana's music career began in the 1990s in the Mission District, San Francisco; she moved to Brooklyn in 2003. She formed the band Skirt with Nicole Pinon and she is still releasing songs from that time.

She began her band with Mike Amari in February 2011. She has two home-made self releases from her Bandcamp titled Channel and Velvet Pop. In January 2012, she released an EP titled In The Light.

On April 7, 2015, Falana released her debut full-length album, Set Your Lightning Fire Free, via Team Love Records followed by a 38-date United States tour Pitchfork Review Go .

Her single "Go" was used in American Horror Story season 5 Episode 11.

Her track "There's A Way" (one of the songs from her band "Skirt") is featured on the 2016 compilation The Future's So Bright It Berns!, which was made to support the presidential campaign of Bernie Sanders.

On October 21, 2016, the band released its second album, "Here Comes the Wave".

On October 25, 2019 they released Darkest Light, put out by Arrowhawk Records. The song "Go Higher" was featured on the show The Summer I Turned Pretty episode 7.

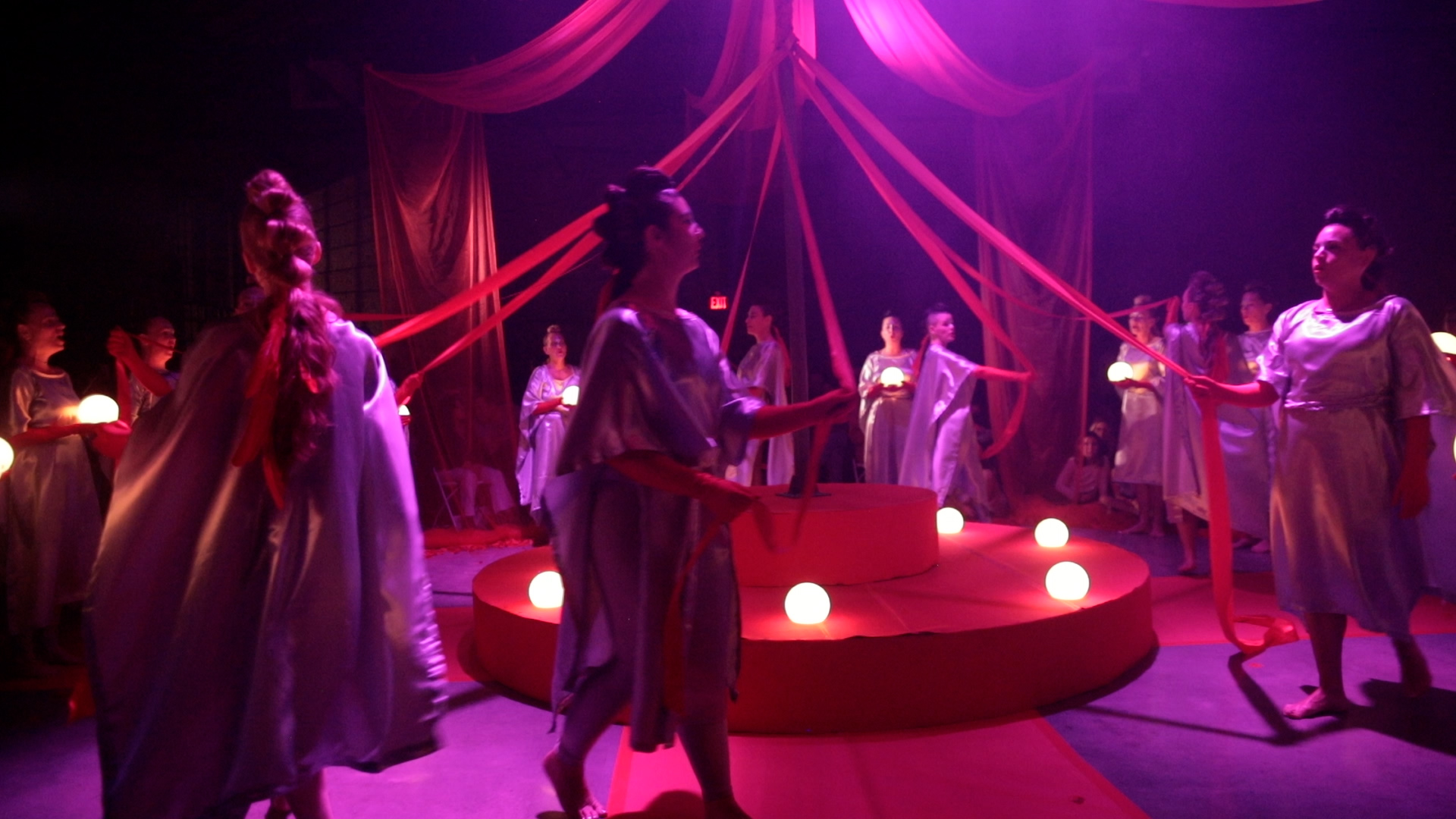

== Discography ==
Studio albums

- Set Your Lightning Fire Free (2015, Team Love)
- Here Comes the Wave (2016, Team Love)
- Darkest Light (2019)

EPs and collections

- Channel (2011)
- Velvet Pop (2011)
- In The Light (2012)
