= Tommy Tiernan =

Irish comedian, actor, and writer

- Tiernan in 2025
- Born: 16 June 1969 (age 57); Carndonagh, Ireland
- Spouse: Yvonne Tiernan (m. 2009)
- Children: 6
- Relatives: Eleanor Tiernan (cousin)

Comedy career
- Years active: 1992–present
- Medium: Stand-up; television; radio
- Genres: Satire; black comedy
- Website: tommytiernan.com

Tommy Tiernan (/ˈtɪərnən/; born 16 June 1969) is an Irish comedian, actor, and writer. He is best known for his stand-up career, hosting The Tommy Tiernan Show (2017–present) and playing Gerry in the sitcom Derry Girls (2018–2022).

== Early life ==
Tiernan was born in Carndonagh, County Donegal in 1969, the son of a mother from County Limerick and a father from County Kerry. He moved with his family as a child; after spells living in London and Zambia, he attended the Catholic ex-junior seminary St Patrick's Classical School in Navan, where his schoolmates included Hector Ó hEochagáin and Dylan Moran.

== Career ==
Tiernan has appeared several times on The Late Late Show. In the United States, he has appeared several times on the Late Show with David Letterman. He has also appeared on Michael McIntyre's Comedy Roadshow, The Lee Mack Show, Dave's One Night Stand, QI, and joined Eddie Izzard and Ross Noble at Laughs in the Park.

In "Going to America", the final episode of the clerical sitcom Father Ted, Tiernan plays a young priest. In the 1999 Channel 4 sitcom Small Potatoes, Tiernan took the lead role of Ed Blewitt, an underachiever who works in an east London video rental shop. It ran for 13 episodes over 2 seasons, ending in 2001.

In 2008, Tiernan and Hector Ó hEochagáin formed as a radio duo on The Tommy and Hector Show on i102-104FM after hinting at a desire to be on the radio, months before on The Late Late Show. Speaking about his role, Tiernan said, "I've always wanted to have loads of craic on the radio. What better way to have a mountain of devilment than to do a show with my best friend." Following the success of their show on iRadio Northwest, the show moved to the nationwide slot of Saturday 10am-12pm on 2FM.

In 2013, Tiernan performed in Vicar Street, Dublin, for his 200th show, in front of an audience of 1,000 people.

To date Tiernan has eight stand-up comedy DVDs: Tommy Tiernan Live, Cracked, Loose, Jokerman: Tommy Tiernan in America, Ok Baby, Bovinity, Crooked Man and Stray Sod.

On 5 January 2017, Tiernan presented the first episode of The Tommy Tiernan Show on RTÉ One.

Tiernan starred as Da Gerry in the sitcom Derry Girls for three seasons between 2018 and 2022.

He was a presenter of the Tommy and Hector Podcast with Laurita Blewitt from September 2020 until its closure in April 2024.

=== Controversies ===
In 2007, some families of people with Down syndrome complained about a routine in Tiernan's act about people with the condition. It had caused some surprise to some of the families as he previously ran a marathon in support of Down Syndrome Ireland.

An appearance on The Late Late Show in 2008 led to complaints about Tiernan's jokes involving a methadone user, Eastern European immigrant accents, buying a motorbike from an injured biker, and a film idea about "gay Traveller spacemen" seeking a cure for gayness, eight of which were upheld by the Broadcasting Complaints Commission. Some of his previous routines which went largely without remark included a comic reference to disproportionate American reaction to 9/11 and the indifferent Israeli attitude to foreign criticism of their occupations of surrounding land.

==== 2009 anti-Semitism controversy ====
In September 2009, while being interviewed by Olaf Tyaransen for Hot Press magazine at a pre-performance Q&A session at Electric Picnic in County Laois, Tiernan was asked by an audience member if he had ever been accused of antisemitism. He responded by making remarks about the Holocaust and Jews and the death of Christ. He stated that a comedian should not be looked to for political correctness and said, "These Jews, these fucking Jew cunts come up to me. Fucking Christ-killing bastards. Fucking six million? I would have got 10 or 12 million out of that. No fucking problem! Fuck them." He later suggested in several interviews that his points were intended as a commentary on how somebody's words can easily be taken out of context when a small segment of a dialogue is quoted. The response of the audience was criticised as "disappointing" by Fine Gael's Alan Shatter, who also said, "I would regard it as particularly sad that people found that sort of outburst in any way amusing." Tiernan later released a statement that said he had not meant to cause offence and that his words had been taken out of context. He said that the comments were part of an attempt to explain his belief that comedians have a duty to be "irresponsible and reckless", to allow "whatever lunacy is within you to come out", and that they should never be taken out of context. He added that the statements that had caused controversy had been preceded by a statement not to take the rant seriously.

Catholic Archbishop Diarmuid Martin described the remarks as "offensive to the Jewish community" and "insensitive and hurtful to the suffering of the victims," calling the Holocaust "a memory which is sacred". Holocaust Education Trust Ireland labelled the statements "appalling". Ruairi Quinn of the Labour Party, then chair of the Trust, urged the public to reject what he called "racist entertainment," criticising both Tiernan and the audience's reaction. Filmmaker Louis Lentin went further, calling the remarks "disgraceful" and "extraordinarily racist," and argued that Tiernan should have been denied a U.S. visa for his planned shows later that year. Rabbi and comedian Bob Alper accused Tiernan of attempting to "weasel out" of the controversy. However, Tiernan received some support. Hot Press editor Niall Stokes defended him, claiming the comedian was "satirising anti-Semitism" and that interpreting the remarks as hateful was "wrongheaded". Olaf Tyaransen, who hosted the event, maintained that Tiernan’s comments had been taken out of context and were prompted by a question on past accusations of anti-Semitism. He described the performance as "very funny".

==== Racial humour ====
In January 2023 Tommy Tiernan started his standup routine in Vicar Street with a joke that he said his daughter had warned him not to use. RTÉ presenter Emer O'Neill, who is black, was in the audience and left with friends after a while to avoid being heckled. She described the joke as racist and "way too close to the bone". Tiernan contacted her via email and phoned her to apologise. They spoke on the phone for an hour and he conceded she was right to call him out on it. He removed the joke from his routine.

== Comic style ==
When Tiernan started out, he wanted to be like Lenny Bruce. However, unlike Bruce, he does not regard himself as being a comedian "with a message". He had admitted that his sense of humour is controversial, but claims that it is based on instinct and denies there is any malice in it.

== Filmography ==
=== Film ===
Year	Title	Role	Notes
1996	Angela Mooney Dies Again	Timmy	
1997	The Very Stuff	Damien	Short film
1997	The Matchmaker	Vince	
1999	Hold Back the Night	John	
2000	About Adam	Simon	
2001	The Riblok Foundation	Ernest	
2005	Bumble's Burden	Bumble	Short film
2018	An Béal Bocht - The Poor Mouth	Martin O'Bannasa	Short film
2019	Dark Lies the Island	Richie	
2020	Wolfwalkers	Seán Óg Woodcutter	Voice
2022	Joyride	Ferryman	

=== Television ===
Year	Title	Role	Notes	Ref(s)
1998	Father Ted	Father Kevin	Episode: "Going to America"	
1998–2001	Small Potatoes	Ed Hewitt	Main role	
2012	Little Crackers	Dad	Episode: "Tommy Tiernan's Little Cracker: Howler"	
2017–present	The Tommy Tiernan Show	Himself	Main role	
2018–2022	Derry Girls	Gerry Quinn	19 episodes	
2018	Hardy Bucks	Priest	Episode: "The Viper"	
2022	Conversations with Friends	Dennis	3 episodes	

=== Music videos ===
Year	Song	Artist
2017	'Galway Girl'	Ed Sheeran

== Personal life ==
Tiernan has three children with former partner Jayme Street. He married Yvonne McMahon, his partner and manager, on 9 August 2009 at St. Patrick’s Catholic Church in County Monaghan; they had been together since December 2002. They have three children. Tiernan enjoys attending Mass. He has been diagnosed with attention deficit hyperactivity disorder.

== Awards ==
In 1996, Tiernan won the Channel 4 "So You Think You're Funny" award. Two years later he was awarded the Perrier Comedy Award at the 1998 Edinburgh Festival Fringe and won the Best Stand-Up Award at the British Comedy Awards. In 2003, he won the Nokia Best of the Fest Award and the Orange People Choice Award at the Edinburgh Comedy Festival. In 2006, he won Ireland's Funniest Living Person Award at the People of the Year Awards.
