= Bottoms of Barrels =

Studio album by Tilly and the Wall
- Released: May 23, 2006
- Genre: Indie pop
- Length: 41:39
- Label: Team Love

Tilly and the Wall chronology
Wild Like Children (2004)	Bottoms of Barrels (2006)	o (2008)

Professional ratings
Review scores
Source	Rating
Allmusic	4/5 stars
Pitchfork Media	(7.6/10)

Bottoms of Barrels is the second album by Omaha, Nebraska's Tilly and the Wall. It was released on Team Love Records.

The album was the ninth release of Team Love Records; its Australian release was June 2, 2007 by Dew Process. Singles to date nationally: "Bad Education," "Rainbows in the Dark," "Sing Songs Along," and "The Freest Man."

== Track listing ==
1. "Rainbows in the Dark"
2. "Urgency"
3. "Bad Education"
4. "Lost Girls"
5. "Love Song"
6. "Sing Songs Along"
7. "Black and Blue"
8. "Brave Day"
9. "The Freest Man"
10. "Coughing Colors"

The enhanced CD version comes with behind-the-scenes footage of the band recording the album. There was a bonus 7" record for "Bad Education" that came along with the purchase of the album.

=== U.K. Edition ===
1. "Patience, Babe"
2. "Sing Songs Along"
3. "Black and Blue"
4. "Lost Girls"
5. "Urgency"
6. "Bad Education"
7. "The Freest Man"
8. "Rainbows in the Dark"
9. "Love Song"
10. "Coughing Colors"
11. "Brave Day"

The U.K. edition featured a bonus track, "Patience, Babe", songs appeared in a different order, and had longer versions of "Bad Education" and "The Freest Man".

== Additional musicians ==
- Clark Baechle: electronic beats (tracks 4, 7, 9)
- Carrie Butler: violin (tracks 3, 10)
- Ryan Fox: saxophone (track 8)
- Myranda Hagemann: cello (tracks 6, 10)
- Dan McCarthy: accordion (track 3)
- Jesse McKelvey: drums (track 2)
- A.J. Mogis: organ (track 2)
- Mike Mogis: electric guitar (tracks 1, 3, 4, 8, 9, 10) ebow (track 1), keyboard (tracks 1, 6, 9, 10), slide guitar (track 7), mellotron (track 10), and bass (track 9)
- Charlie Vinz!: bells (tracks 1, 5, 6)
- Nate Walcott: trumpet (tracks 1, 3)
- James SK Wān: bamboo flute (tracks 2, 3)
- Clint Wheeler: drums (track 8)
- Trip the Light Fantastic (tracks 4, 6, 8)
