= A Weather =

American indie rock band

- Origin: Portland, Oregon, U.S.
- Genre: Indie rock
- Years active: 2007–present
- Label: Team Love
- Members: Aaron Gerber; Sarah Winchester; Zach Boyle; Aaron Krenkel; Louis Thomas

A Weather is an American indie rock band from Portland, Oregon, fronted by Aaron Gerber and Sarah Winchester. Other members include Zach Boyle, Aaron Krenkel and Louis Thomas. Their debut album, Cove (2008), was described as "tenderly crafted chamber pop" and "bursting with intricately plotted melodies and lush arrangements", and was released to favourable reviews.

In 2007, the band toured in the United States with Bright Eyes.

In March 2010, A Weather released its second studio record entitled Everyday Balloons.

== Discography ==
- Cove (2008, Team Love)
- Everyday Balloons (2010, Team Love)
