= Mars Black (musician) =

American rapper

Mars Black is an Omaha, Nebraska based hip-hop artist, born in Brooklyn, New York. Black takes his stage name from Mars Blackman, a character that appeared in Air Jordan commercials directed by Spike Lee in the 1980s. His debut album, Folks Music, was released on Team Love Records in 2004 to mixed reviews. Black is the only rapper signed to Team Love, which is a label owned by Conor Oberst primarily associated with indie rock. He toured with such acts as Bright Eyes and The Faint in 2005. In 2008, he released his second full-length for Team Love, Stay Black.

== Discography ==
- Folks Music (2004 · Team Love Records)
- Hot Chick EP (2008 · Team Love Records)
- Stay Black (2008 · Team Love Records)
- Legendary Angel Gang (2012)

== See also ==
- Music in Omaha
