= Hector Ó hEochagáin =

Irish radio and television presenter

Shane "Hector" Ó hEochagáin
- Born: Shane Keogan; 17 August 1969 (age 57); Drogheda, County Louth, Ireland
- Education: St Patrick's Classical School, Trinity College Dublin
- Occupation: Broadcaster
- Employer: TG4
- Known for: Promoting the Irish language, horseracing, television, radio
- Spouse: Dympna Griffin (2002–present)

Shane Ó hEochagáin (pronounced [oː ˈhoːxəɡaːnʲ] oh-HOE-khu-gawn; (of the tribe of Uí Néill) born 17 August 1969), known mononymously as Hector, is an Irish television and radio presenter born in Drogheda, County Louth, and raised in Navan, County Meath. He is best known for travel shows on TG4, the Irish language television station in Ireland. He previously presented The Tommy, Hector and Laurita Podcast from September 2020 to April 2024, Breakfast with Hector on weekday mornings on RTÉ 2fm from October 2010 to December 2013 and The Sunday Sitting Room on Today FM.

== Career ==
Born as Shane Keogan in Drogheda, County Louth, Ó hEochagáin attended St Patrick's Classical School in Navan at the same time as Tommy Tiernan and Dylan Moran. He first came to the attention of Irish viewers with his travelogue programme Amú on TG4.

After a few series with TG4, he created and hosted two primetime series: Only Fools Buy Horses, which took a satirical look at the world of race-horse ownership; and Hanging with Hector, which featured Ó hEochagáin spending time with Irish celebrities. One episode featured Ó hEochagáin with Taoiseach Bertie Ahern. Others included a penalty shootout with goalkeeper Shay Given at Newcastle United; taking on Ken Doherty in snooker; and, most recently, spending time with Aidan O'Brien, one of the world's most successful race horse trainers.

He has won multiple Irish Film and Television Awards (IFTAs) for his shows, and presented a radio show on i102-104FM and RTÉ 2FM with close friend Tommy Tiernan.

Ó hEochagáin worked as a mechanical effects assistant on films such as "The Haunting of Hell House" and "Knocking On Death's Door". He has also appeared in advertisements for Paddy Whiskey and Horse Racing Ireland.

Ó hEochagáin has filmed multiple series for TG4 which saw him travelling throughout Britain and Ireland and from Siberia to Saigon among others. He also presented two popular satirical documentaries on rugby, Chasing the Lions, a TV3 documentary featuring Après Match star Risteárd Cooper that saw both men follow the British and Irish Lions rugby team on their tour of New Zealand; and Chasing the Blues, following the misfortunes of the Irish rugby team at the World Cup in France.

In the 2010 autumn schedule of RTÉ 2fm, Ó hEochagáin was selected as the new presenter of the breakfast show, from 7 to 9am, starting on 4 October 2010, and broadcast from the RTÉ studios in Galway. The show was axed in December 2013, and in September 2014 Ó hEochagáin vowed that he would "never work for 2FM again".

In January 2013 he presented a new four-part series called Hector Goes on RTÉ 1. Part One of the series, ‘Hector Goes Holy’, sees him discussing the role of the Catholic Church in the contemporary Republic of Ireland (he didn't cover Northern Ireland, or Ulster more generally, in the episode). Part Two, called ‘Hector Goes Traveller’, has him discovering the Traveller lifestyle today in Ireland. Part Three, ‘Hector Goes Country’, sees him in the company of Mike Denver, and discovering the world of Country and Western music in Ireland. The final episode in the series, ‘Hector Goes Hunting’, sees him in the world of hunting and shooting in Ireland. The series was broadcast on RTÉ 1 and reached over 1.8 million viewers. A new series of Hector Goes started airing in March 2014. The first episode was called Hector Goes Fishing, and the second episode aired on 10 March and was called Hector goes Courtin.

Hector Previously presented his own show on Today FM ( called Hector’s Sunday Sitting Room covered for Ian Dempsey on Today FM during 2015.

In 2019 he presented Hector USA - Ó Chósta go Cósta, where he takes on a road trip in the US from Coast to Coast, across the Southern States from Savannah on the Atlantic to San Diego on the Pacific, road-tripping from Georgia through Alabama, Mississippi and Louisiana into Texas, New Mexico and Arizona before finishing up on the Pacific seaboard in California, covering 8 states and more than 5,000 miles on the road.

He presented The Tommy, Hector and Laurita Podcast from September 2020 until it finished in April 2024.

In November 2024, his non-fiction book, The Irish Words You Should Know, won at the 2024 Irish Book Awards.
