= This Guitar =

Studio album by David Dondero
- Released: October 2013
- Recorded: 2013
- Genre: Folk rock, Indie rock, Country rock, singer-songwriter
- Length: 38:05

David Dondero chronology
Golden Hits Vol. 1 (2011)	This Guitar (2013)

Professional ratings
Review scores
Source	Rating
Examiner	link

This Guitar is the ninth album by American folk rock musician David Dondero, released in October/November 2013. This album was made possible by a successful Kickstarter campaign, and was released shortly after Golden Hits. Vol 1.

== Track listing ==
1. Roses and Rain
2. Boxer's Fracture
3. This Guitar
4. Samantha's Got A Bag Of Coal
5. Take a Left Turn in Boise
6. Aleuitious and the Typewriter Keys
7. Don't You Feel
8. Alcohol
9. There's No Tomorrow in This Song
10. New Berlin Wall
11. This Guitar (guitar Version)
