= I105-107FM =

Irish regional radio station

i105-107FM

Ireland
- Broadcast area: Counties Cavan, Kildare, (north) Laois, Louth, Meath, Monaghan, Offaly and Westmeath
- Frequency: 104.7-106.7 MHz

Programming
- Format: Contemporary, youth orientated (15-34 age group)

Ownership
- Owner: iRadio

History
- First air date: 24 November 2008

Links
- Website: www.i105107.ie

i105-107FM was a regional radio station in Ireland that broadcast to the north east and midlands of the country. The station was one of four regional youth orientated stations that were licensed by the Broadcasting Authority of Ireland to challenge the current monopoly in the 15 to 34 age bracket by national stations RTÉ 2fm and Today FM.

The station was based in Athlone and broadcast to Counties Carlow, Cavan, Kildare, (north) Laois, Louth, Meath, Monaghan, Offaly and Westmeath between the frequencies of 104.7 MHz and 106.7 MHz, as well as offering an online stream.

The station's sister was i102-104, but in 2011, they merged to form iRadio

i105-107FM was launched in November 2008 and was owned by the iRadio consortium, who also hold the licence for the north west service through i102-104FM, which was launched in February 2008, and the two stations shared a number of programmes including the Tommy and Hector Show.

On the day Barack Obama was inaugurated (20 January 2009), the station changed its name to temporarily to 'Obama FM' in his honour for the day.

== See also ==
- Radio in Ireland
