= Tilly and the Wall =

American indie pop band

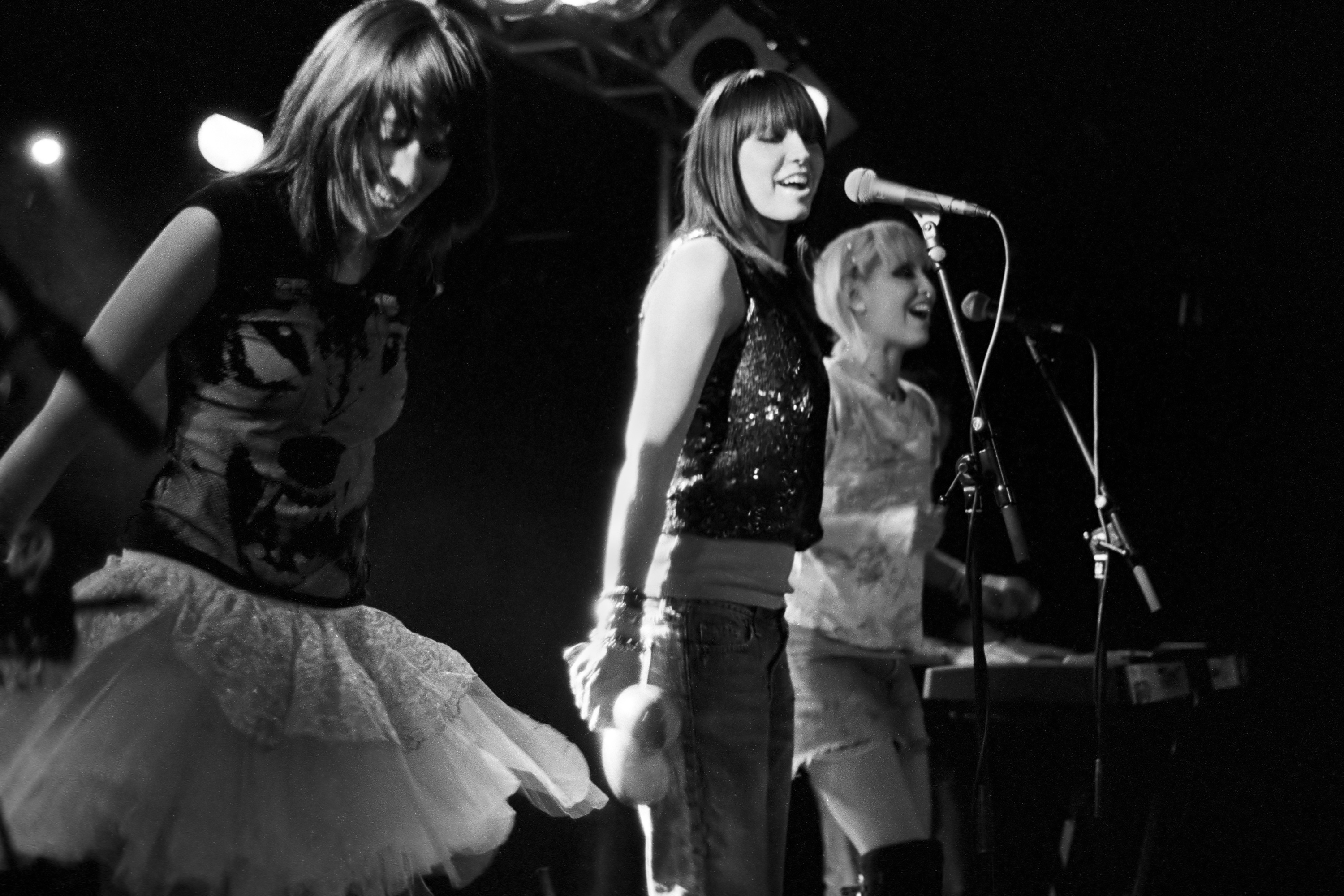
- Tilly and the Wall live at Debaser, Stockholm, Sweden

Background information
- Origin: Omaha, Nebraska, U.S.
- Genres: Indie pop, indie rock, Twee pop
- Years active: 2001–2013
- Labels: Team Love, Dew Process, Moshi Moshi
- Members: Kianna Alarid; Neely Jenkins; Derek Pressnall; Jamie Pressnall; Nick White

Tilly and the Wall was an indie pop group from Omaha, Nebraska. Their name originated from a children's book called Tillie and the Wall, written by Leo Lionni. They are particularly noted for having a tap dancer, Jamie Pressnall, provide percussion, instead of a drummer.

== History ==
=== Formation and Wild Like Children ===
The group formed in 2001 after the demise of several Omaha groups, including Conor Oberst's Park Ave., of which Neely Jenkins and Jamie Pressnall (then Jamie Williams) were members. Jamie brought along Kianna Alarid from another band that broke up called Magic Kiss. Derek Pressnall and Nick White, natives of Dunwoody, Georgia were drawn to the music scene in Omaha, Nebraska, and moved. Nick White was also one of the few constants for Bright Eyes in 2005, appearing on I'm Wide Awake, It's Morning and Digital Ash in a Digital Urn, as well as touring worldwide with the band.

Their first show was an open-mic night at the now defunct Ranch Bowl. Their first release, Woo!, was recorded in Conor Oberst's garage, self-published, and distributed at shows around the Omaha area. The group released a limited-pressing eponymous 7" on Rue Royale Records, followed by their debut LP, Wild Like Children in 2004. It was the flagship release on Oberst's Team Love label and made with the help of Presto studios. Wild Like Children garnered the band a substantial amount of critical acclaim and propelled them to national tours with Bright Eyes, Rilo Kiley, and Of Montreal. In early 2005, Tilly and the Wall became the first "band in residence" at Omaha's Bemis Center for Contemporary Arts, using the Bemis Underground's Studio T to develop their follow-up album to Wild Like Children.

In September of that year, they released "You and I Misbehaving" as a limited-pressing 7" in the UK through indie label Trash Aesthetics. This release picked up further critical acclaim as well as support from BBC Radio broadcaster Steve Lamacq. They played their first show outside of the US at the Freebutt in Brighton on February 14, 2006.

=== Bottoms of Barrels ===
Bottoms of Barrels, the band's follow-up to Wild Like Children, was released on May 23, 2006. Tilly and the Wall appeared on the Late Show with David Letterman on October 27, 2006, to perform "Bad Education". The song was not played in full due to time constraints. A number of live dates were played to support the album. The band toured with Jenny Lewis in support of her album featuring The Watson Twins, Rabbit Fur Coat. They then went on their first headlining tour to promote Bottoms of Barrels, with acts such as David Dondero, Now It's Overhead, and Wolf Colonel supporting them. They played the Coachella Valley Music and Arts Festival on April 27, 2007. In addition to performing at 2007's Splendour in the Grass festival, Tilly and the Wall toured Australia.

Band members Jamie Williams and Derek Pressnall were married shortly after the album's release, on August 12, 2006.

=== o ===
On February 25, Tilly and the Wall released a video for a new song entitled "Beat Control". The digital release of the song was on March 4, with a new album track "Cacophony" appearing as a b-side. "Beat Control" was released only as a single and was not included on the album released later in 2008.

Tilly and the Wall's third album, o, was released on June 17, 2008. Two songs they performed on their 2007 tour, "Too Excited" and "Chandelier Lake", appear on the album. The songs were played at their Daytrotter show.

Tilly recorded their own version of the ABC song for the new season of Sesame Street.

The first single from the album was "Pot Kettle Black". It was featured in the pilot episode of 90210, TV spots for the Seth Rogen film Observe and Report, the film Whip It and its soundtrack album, and in the video game Midnight Club: Los Angeles.

=== Heavy Mood ===
Tilly and the Wall released a new album entitled Heavy Mood on October 2, 2012, available in CD and vinyl formats.

== Flowers Forever ==
Flowers Forever is the side project of Tilly and the Wall guitarist Derek Pressnall. The band has released a full-length album of the same name on Team Love Records in 2008.

== Band members ==
- Kianna Alarid – vocals, shakers, tambourine, bass guitar
- Neely Jenkins – vocals, shakers, bells, bass guitar
- Derek Pressnall – vocals, guitar
- Jamie Pressnall – vocals, tap dancer
- Nick White – keyboards, piano

== Discography ==
=== Albums ===
- Wild Like Children (2004) – Team Love Records – CD/LP
- Bottoms of Barrels (2006) – Team Love Records – CD/LP
- o (2008) – Team Love Records – CD/LP
- Heavy Mood (2012) – Team Love Records – CD/LP
- I Want to F*ck It Up (Tilly and the Wall 2002-2013) (2020) – Team Love Records – CD/LP

=== Singles and EPs ===
- "Nights of the Living Dead" on the compilation Ben Eberbaugh: A Rockin' Tribute (2003) – Die Slaughterhaus Records – CD – UK No. 158
- Woo! (2003) – self-released – EP
- Tilly and the Wall (2003) – Rue Royale Records – 7"
- "You and I Misbehaving" (2005) – Trash Aesthetics – 7"
- "Reckless" (2006) – Trash Aesthetics – 7" – UK No. 235
- "Bad Education" (2006) – Team Love Records) – 7"
- "The Freest Man" (2007) – w/ "The Freest Man" (CSS Remix) – Moshi Moshi Records – 7"
- "Beat Control" (2008) – w/ "Cacophony" – 7"/Digital Download – UK No. 77
- "Pot Kettle Black (2009) w/ "Save Me Now" – Moshi Moshi Records – 7"/Digital Download
- "That Remix Sucks (2009) – Team Love Records
- "Falling Without Knowing" (2009) – Moshi Moshi Records

=== Featured singles ===
- The track "In The Sun" by She & Him where they provided guest backing vocals, on the album Volume Two. They were not credited on the track name, but were credited in the credits booklet that came with the CD.

== Videography ==
=== Shortform ===
- "You and I Misbehaving" (2004, directed by Nik Fackler)
- "Reckless" (2004, directed by Dominic DeJoseph)
- "The Ice Storm, Big Gust, and You" (2004, directed by Kim Hager)
- "Bad Education" (2006, directed by Nik Fackler)
- "Rainbows in the Dark" (version 1) (2006, fan footage edited by Nik Fackler & Alan Tanner)
- "Sing Songs Along" (2006, directed by Kinga Burza)
- "Rainbows in the Dark" (version 2) (2006, directed by Julian Acosta)
- "The Freest Man" (version 1) (2007, directed by Jacob Thiele)
- "The Freest Man" (version 2) (2007, directed by Julian Acosta)
- "Beat Control" (2008, directed by Cody Critcheloe & Drew Bolton of The Ssion)
- "Pot Kettle Black" (2008, directed by Alan Tanner)
- "Alligator Skin" (2008, directed by Whoop Dee Doo)
- "Defenders" (2012, Directed by Ben Fee)

=== Longform ===
- Tilly and the Wall's First Trip to Europe (2006, directed by Rob Walters for Current TV)
- Tilly and the Wall (2007, directed by Rob Walters)
