= Knockmore, County Mayo =

Knockmore An Cnoc Mór
- Village
- Location in Ireland
- Coordinates: 54.0238°N 9.1747°W
- Country: Ireland
- Province: Connacht
- County: County Mayo

Knockmore (Irish: An Cnoc Mór, meaning 'the big hill') is a village in County Mayo, Ireland in the Parish of Backs. It is adjacent to Lough Conn between the towns of Castlebar and Ballina.

== Sport ==
The local Gaelic football, Knockmore GAA, has won 9 Mayo Senior Football Championships, three Connacht Senior Club Football Championships, and in 1997 they reached the All-Ireland Senior Club Football Championship final, losing out to Crossmaglen Rangers.

== See also ==
- List of towns and villages in Ireland.
