= I102-104FM =

Irish regional radio station

i102-104FM
Ireland
- Broadcast area: Counties Donegal, Galway, Leitrim, Longford, Mayo, Roscommon and Sligo
- Frequency: 102–104 MHz (and 96.9 MHz in County Donegal)

Programming
- Format: Contemporary, youth oriented, T.A.: 15-34 y.o.

Ownership
- Owner: iRadio

History
- First air date: 7 February 2008
- Last air date: 4 July 2011

Links
- Website: www.i102-104.ie

i102-104FM was a regional station in Ireland, launched on 7 February 2008. The station had won a licence – as part of a strategy by the Broadcasting Authority of Ireland to create a network of regional youth stations across the Republic – to operate a 'youth' oriented station that would broadcast across seven counties in the northwest and west of Ireland, targeting listeners aged between 15 and 34.

On 4 July 2011, i102-104FM merged with its sister station i105-107FM; the combined station now broadcasts as iRadio.

i102-104FM had its studios originally in Galway City, and towards the end of the station's life, Athlone. It was licensed to cover Counties Donegal, Galway, Leitrim, Longford, Mayo, Roscommon and Sligo. It was also popular in the neighbouring regions of counties Clare, Limerick, Tipperary, Offaly, Westmeath, Cavan, Monaghan and the border areas of the North. In County Donegal, because local radio station Highland Radio was already broadcasting on 103.3 MHz, i102-104 used the frequency of 96.9 MHz. High-profile figures such as the comedian Tommy Tiernan and the presenter Hector Ó hEochagáin were signed up in an effort to raise the profile of the station.

There had been five competitors for the lucrative northwest licence, with bids coming from Dublin's SPIN 1038, Cork's Red FM, and the northwest station Ocean FM, through 'Vibe FM', and the €20m licence was granted to i105-107FM in November 2006. i102-104FM was owned by the iRadio consortium that has applied for several other of the regional youth licences on offer from the BAI, winning the northeast and midlands licence through i105-107FM.

In August 2009 i102-104 was rated the fastest growing 15-to-34 radio station in the country, reaching over 166,000 people each week. It was also the regional radio station most listened to by 18- to 34-year-olds in Ireland.

== See also ==
- Radio in Ireland
