= IRadio =

Irish radio station

iRADIO
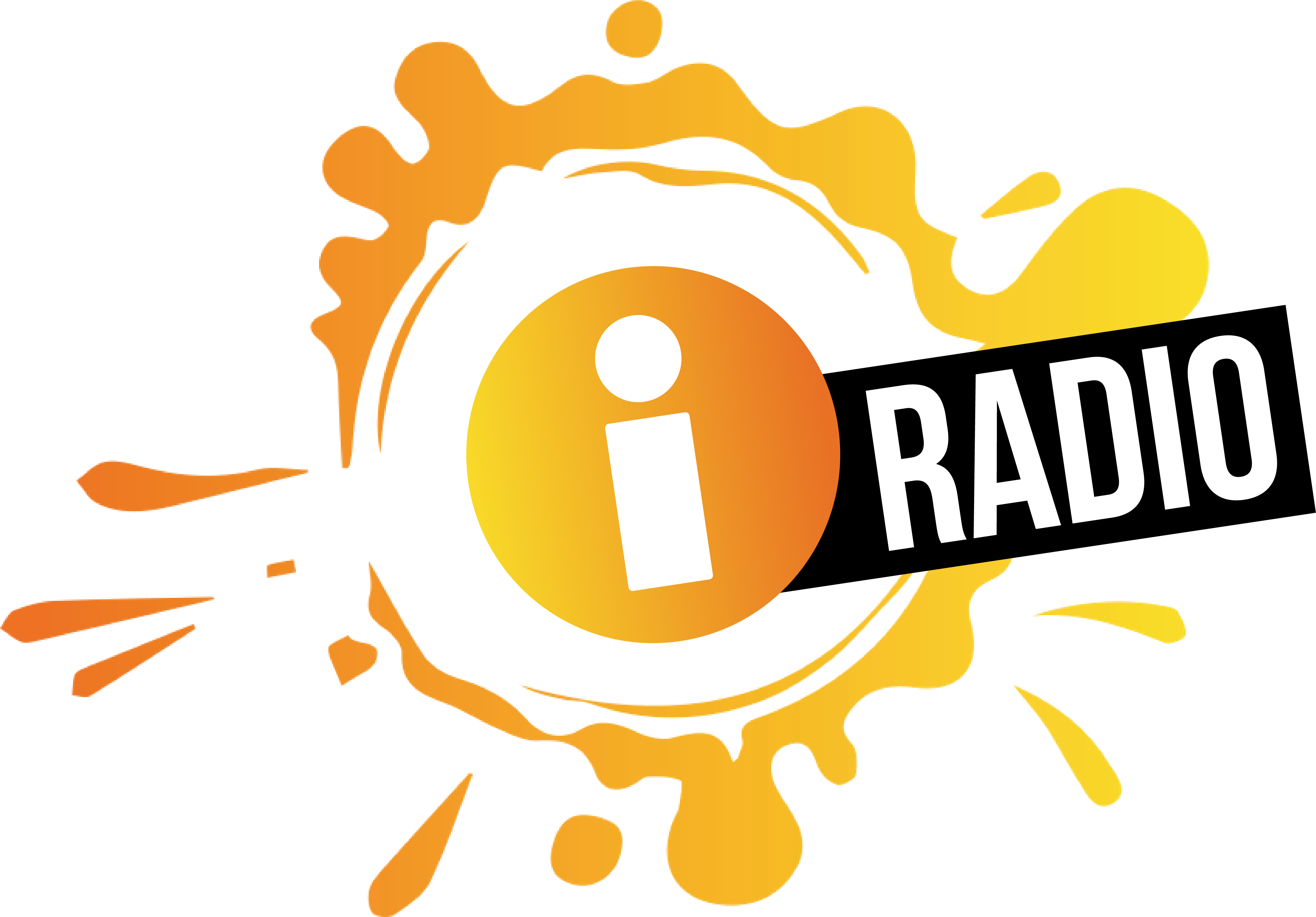
- Ireland
- Broadcast area: Border Region Mid-East Region; Midland Region West Region
- Frequencies: 96.9 MHz (East County Donegal, Derry); 102.1-104.4 MHz (North-West); 104.7-106.7 MHz (North-East)
- RDS: iRADIO
- Branding: Where Hit Music Lives

Programming
- Languages: English, Irish
- Format: CHR

Ownership
- Owner: Bauer Media Audio Ireland (2023–present)
- Sister stations: Newstalk; Today FM; Dublin's 98FM; Spin 1038; Spin South West; Cork's Red FM; Beat 102 103

History
- First air date: 4 July, 2011

Links
- Webcast: Listen Live
- Website: iradio.ie

iRADIO is a music-driven youth radio station broadcasting to the Border, West, Mid-East and Midland regions of Ireland. The station is one of four music-driven youth stations that is licensed by Coimisiún na Meán to challenge the current duopoly in the 15-34 age bracket for those outside Dublin by national stations RTÉ 2fm and Today FM.

The station offers a mix of music, chat, competitions, and topical segments, providing a vibrant alternative to traditional radio. Its presenters are known for their energetic style and strong engagement with listeners through both on-air content and digital platforms.

Based in Athlone, it is the most listened to radio station with 15-34 year olds in its franchise area, with weekly listenership of 328,000. It was created by the merger of i102-104FM and i105-107FM on 4 July 2011. The combined 15-county franchise was awarded a new ten-year licence in 2019.

In August 2023, it was announced that iRadio would be acquired by Bauer Media Audio Ireland. On 4 December, the purchase was completed. It adopted a new branding kit in 2025, to closer align with sister stations across the Bauer network.

== Broadcast Area ==
iRADIO is licensed to cover 15 counties across Ireland:

- Cavan
- Donegal
- Galway
- Kildare
- Leitrim
- Laois
- Longford
- Louth
- Mayo
- Meath
- Monaghan
- Offaly
- Roscommon
- Sligo
- Westmeath

The station can also be received in parts of Dublin, North Tipperary, Wicklow, Armagh, Fermanagh and Derry via overspill.

== Programming ==
iRADIO primarily broadcasts contemporary hit music (Top 40), targeting a core audience of 15-34 year-olds. The station features a range of programming throughout the day, including music, entertainment, and youth-focused content.

News and entertainment bulletins are broadcast hourly, delivering a mix of local, national, and international news, sports updates, and a weather summary.

Since 2024, the station has syndicated some programming on Friday and Saturday nights with its sister stations SPIN 1038 and SPIN South West.

== Presenters ==
- Steven Cooper (iMornings with Cooper & Oonagh / iRadio's iConic Anthems)
- Oonagh O'Carroll (iMornings with Cooper & Oonagh)
- Sharron Lynskey (iRadio Daytimes)
- Míchéal Kearney (Míchéal, Shane & Ella on iRadio)
- Shane O'Loughlin (Míchéal, Shane & Ella on iRadio)
- Ella Carey (Míchéal, Shane & Ella on iRadio)
- Valerie McHugh (iRadio's Groupchat)
- Leona Gilmore (iRadio @ Night / iRadio's Hits & Sport)
- Marty Guilfoyle (iRadio's 6 to 6)
- Jen Payne (iRadio's 6 to 6)
- Matthew Matthews (Matt & Katie on iRadio)
- Katie Cunningham (Matt & Katie on iRadio)
- Leah Hogarty (iRadio's Big 40)
- Ciaran O'Connor (iRadio's All Irish)
- Fergal D'Arcy (iRadio Cover)

== See also ==
- Radio in Ireland
