= Team Love Records =

American independent record label

Team Love is an independent record label based in New Paltz, New York, and Portland, Maine. The label was founded by Conor Oberst and Nate Krenkel in 2003. It has released albums by several recording artists. Team Love also released the documentary film by Roy Germano, The Other Side of Immigration. An early distinguishing marketing tactic of Team Love was the free release of complete albums for download in unprotected mp3 format at no cost on their website in addition to traditional record and CD sales. This practice evolved and was eventually dropped as the age of streaming came to dominate the user experience. In 2024 Team Love launched a new, "sister-label," Oystertones. Oystertones focuses on jazz, classical, experimental and other music including releases by Obelisk Grove, Double Celled Organism, Bill Brovold, pianist Jamie Saft, NAPPS, and Stacey MacLeay.

== History ==
=== Formation ===
The label was founded in 2003 in part due to Oberst's frustration at not being able to sign and showcase talent quickly enough through the record label on which his own Bright Eyes albums are released, Saddle Creek Records. Saddle Creek was a label his brother helped co-found but was operated and managed by various individuals. Team Love, while once distributed through Saddle Creek, is now distributed directly through Alternative Distribution Alliance.

=== Early years ===
Team Love's first release was Tilly and the Wall's Wild Like Children on June 22, 2004. In 2006, Team Love released Jenny Lewis' solo debut with The Watson Twins and later the Tilly and the Wall follow-up Bottoms of Barrels. The year before, it put out records by David Dondero and Craig Wedren as well as the Bright Eyes live album Motion Sickness (though the band's studio albums are still released through the Saddle Creek imprint). Team Love reissued Park Ave.'s When Jamie Went to London... We Broke Up in late 2005. The album was produced on Urinine Records in 1999, but in 2005 Urinine closed, making the album out of print.

=== Later years ===
In later years, Team Love released Candylion by Super Furry Animals', frontman Gruff Rhys, a live album by art-rock band Shudder To Think, and a remix EP for the Tilly and the Wall single Love Riot, taken from the band's 4th studio album Heavy Mood (2012) which included remixes by Cycad and Distal.

In 2025, Team Love continued its roster with releases by several artists. Jemima James released Silver & Gold, NAPPS released Extended Play Vols. 1-3, and TJ Douglas released Dying.

=== Relocation (2009) ===
In 2009, Team Love moved from the East Village of Manhattan (13th Street, or "Sugar Street") to 11 Church Street in New Paltz NY. The label opened a public space called the Team Love Ravenhouse Gallery (a partnership with Ravenhouse Management) which serves as an art gallery, record store and physical space for music and art fans. The Gallery (TL-RH.com) is open weekends and by appointment. In 2012 the label released the four band compilation album Die Pfalz which featured local artists from the Hudson Valley including Breakfast In Fur, Shana Falana, Bloodletters and electronic artist Cycad. Also notably, Krenkel was a former A&R representative for 8 years with Sony/ATV Publishing before leaving to manage Conor Oberst and start Team Love. He was responsible for signing singer/songwriter Jesse Harris to Sony ATV Music Publishing, who was the main songwriter for Norah Jones' debut album Come Away with Me, winning a Grammy for Song of the Year for her first hit Don't Know Why. He was also the music supervisor on the film Electrick Children. In 2012 Krenkel acquired Full ownership of Team Love.

== Artists ==
- A Weather
- Andrea Tomasi
- Arranged Marriage NP (band)
- Ava Mirzadegan
- The Banddroidz
- Ben Noyes
- bentcousin
- The Berg Sans Nipple
- Bill Brovold
- Billy Stoner
- Bright Eyes
- Broderick & Broderick
- Capgun Coup
- Casco Bay Tummlers
- Casey Scott
- Choir Boy (band)
- Chris Root
- Clean Cut Kid
- Conduits (band)
- Conor Oberst & The Mystic Valley Band
- Craig Benedict Valentine Badynee
- Craig Wedren
- Darci Phenix
- David Dondero
- Demi Spriggs
- Double Celled Organism
- El Madmo
- Ella Hue
- EX OH
- The Felice Brothers
- Flowers Forever
- Girl Gaze
- Good Good Blood
- Gruff Rhys
- Guilt Mountain
- Gulp (band)
- High Up (band)
- iji (band)
- InDreama
- Jamie Saft
- Jason Boesel
- Jemima James
- Jenny Lewis with the Watson Twins
- Johanna Warren
- Joker's Daughter
- Kianna White
- Kendl Winter
- Kyle Morgan
- Last Good Tooth
- Long Beard (band)
- The Lowest Pair
- Mars Black
- McCarthy Trenching
- Midnight Masses (band)
- MiWi La Lupa
- Mustafa Bhagat
- New Raspberry Bandits
- Nik Freitas
- El Madmo
- Obelisk Grove
- Ogre You Asshole
- Palmer T. Lee
- Park Ave. (band)
- Philip Goth
- Phillip Norman Watson
- Popup
- QUARTERBACKS (band)
- Refried Ice Cream
- Roger Lion
- Rig 1
- Roy Germano
- Roz and The Ricecakes
- Saul Conrad
- SDX (band)
- Sea of Bees
- Shana Falana
- Shudder To Think
- Simon Joyner
- Simone Felice
- Stacey Macleay
- Tilly and the Wall
- The Wave Pictures
- Yard Sale (band)
- Yours Are The Only Ears

Former artists

- Willy Mason (later moved to Astralwerks)

== See also ==
- List of record labels
- Saddle Creek Records
