= List of Zooey Deschanel performances =

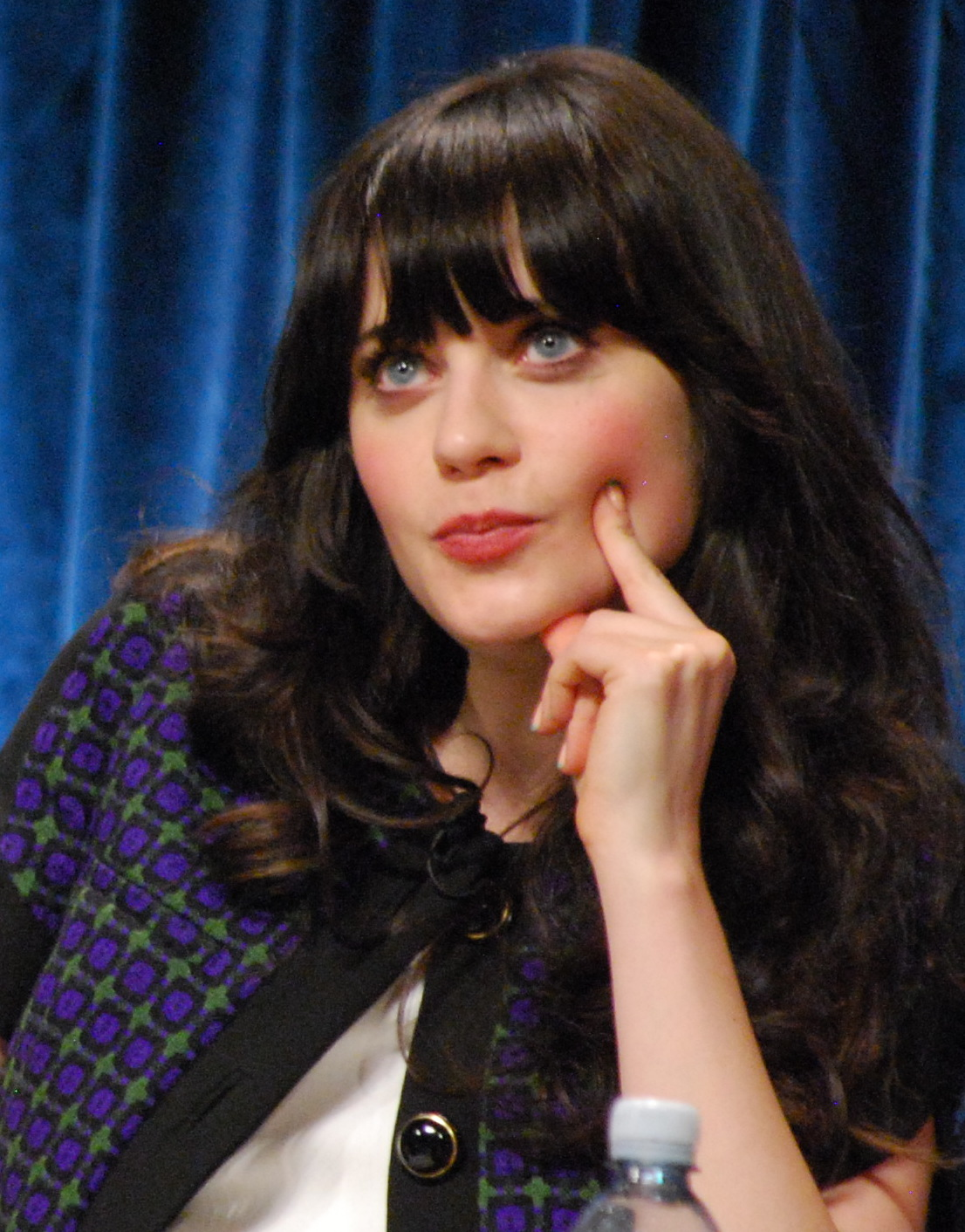
Deschanel at the 2012 PaleyFest

American actress, model, musician, and singer-songwriter Zooey Deschanel made her film debut in the 1999 comedy feature Mumford. She went on to gain public attention by co-starring in the comedy-drama Almost Famous (2000), the independent drama Manic (2001) opposite Joseph Gordon-Levitt, and the comedy-drama The Good Girl (2002). She landed her first major role as an 18-year-old virgin in the romantic drama All the Real Girls (2003), for which she was nominated for an Independent Spirit Award for Best Female Lead. One of Deschanel's biggest commercial successes came with the Christmas-fantasy film Elf (2003), which grossed over $220 million worldwide.

In 2005, Deschanel played Tricia McMillan in Garth Jennings' The Hitchhiker's Guide to the Galaxy, an adaptation of the media franchise of the same name. She followed this with a series of comedy films, including Winter Passing (2005), Failure to Launch (2006), The Go-Getter (2007), and Peyton Reed's Yes Man (2008). Deschanel played a radiant dream girl in the independent romantic comedy-drama (500) Days of Summer (2009), also opposite Gordon-Levitt, for which she garnered a nomination for Best Actress in a Motion Picture at the 14th Satellite Awards. She voiced Bridget in the animated family comedy Trolls (2016), which earned her an Annie Award nomination for Voice Acting in a Feature Production.

Deschanel made her television debut in the sitcom Veronica's Closet in 1998. She later starred as DG in the miniseries Tin Man (2007), a science fiction re-imagining of The Wonderful Wizard of Oz. The miniseries averaged more than 6.3 million viewers during its first night, making it the top-rated cable miniseries of 2007. She voiced Mary Spuckler in three episodes of The Simpsons, since debuting in the 2008 episode "Apocalypse Cow", and guest-starred with her sister Emily in a 2009 episode of the Fox crime procedural drama Bones. In 2011, she landed a starring role in the Fox sitcom New Girl. For her portrayal as goofy school teacher Jessica Day, she received nominations for three Golden Globe Awards and a Primetime Emmy Award, and won the Critics' Choice Television Award for Best Actress in a Comedy Series.

== Film ==
Year	Title	Role	Notes	Ref.
1999	Mumford	Nessa Watkins		
2000	Almost Famous	Anita Miller		
2001	Manic	Tracy		
2002	The Good Girl	Cheryl		
2002	Abandon	Samantha Harper		
2002	Big Trouble	Jenny Herk		
2002	The New Guy	Nora		
2002	Sweet Friggin' Daisies	Zelda	Short	
2003	Whatever We Do	Nikki	Short	
2003	All the Real Girls	Noel		
2003	It's Better to Be Wanted for Murder Than Not to Be Wanted at All	Gas Station Girl	Short	
2003	House Hunting	Christy	Short	
2003	Elf	Jovie		
2004	Eulogy	Kate Collins		
2005	The Hitchhiker's Guide to the Galaxy	Tricia "Trillian" McMillan		
2005	Winter Passing	Reese Holden		
2006	Failure to Launch	Kit		
2006	Live Free or Die	Cheryl		
2007	The Good Life	Frances		
2007	The Go-Getter	Kate		
2007	Bridge to Terabithia	Ms. Edmunds		
2007	Flakes	Miss Pussy Katz		
2007	Raving	Katie	Short	
2007	Surf's Up	Lani Aliikai (voice)		
2007	The Assassination of Jesse James by the Coward Robert Ford	Dorothy Evans		
2008	Gigantic	Harriet "Happy" Lolly		
2008	The Happening	Alma Moore		
2008	Yes Man	Allison		
2009	500 Days of Summer	Summer Finn		
2011	Our Idiot Brother	Natalie		
2011	Your Highness	Princess Belladonna		
2015	Rock the Kasbah	Ronnie		
2015	The Driftless Area	Stella		
2016	Trolls	Bridget (voice)		
2020	Trolls World Tour	Bridget (voice)	Cameo	
2022	Dreamin' Wild	Nancy		
2023	Trolls Band Together	Bridget (voice)		
2024	Harold and the Purple Crayon	Terri		
2025	Merv	Anna Finch		
TBA	Trash Mountain †	Abbi	Filming	

Key
†	Denotes films that have not yet been released

== Television ==
Year(s)	Title	Role	Notes	Ref.
1998	Veronica's Closet	Elena	Episode: "Veronica's Fun and Pirates Are Crazy"	
2002	Frasier	Jen	Episode: "Kissing Cousin"	
2004	Cracking Up	Heidi	Episode: "Birds Do It"	
2005	Once Upon a Mattress	Lady Larken	Television film	
2005–2013	American Dad!	Various voices	2 episodes	
2006–2007	Weeds	Kat Wheeler	4 episodes	
2007	Tin Man	DG	Miniseries	
2008–2025	The Simpsons	Mary Spuckler, Quirky Girl (voice)	4 episodes	
2009	Bones	Margaret Whitesell	Episode: "The Goop on the Girl"	
2010	Funny or Die Presents	Mary Todd Lincoln	Sketch: "Drunk History Vol.5"	
2011–2018	New Girl	Jessica "Jess" Day	Main role; 140 episodes Director ("House Hunt"); Also producer and co-executive producer	
2012	Saturday Night Live	Host / Various characters	Episode: "Zooey Deschanel/Karmin"	
2016	Brooklyn Nine-Nine	Jessica "Jess" Day	Episode: "The Night Shift", crossover episode with New Girl	
2017	Trolls Holiday	Bridget (voice)	Television special	
2021	The Celebrity Dating Game	Co-Host		
2022	Storybots: Answer Time	Cat Burglar Lady	Episode: Keys	
2023	RuPaul's Drag Race All Stars	Herself	Guest judge (season 8); Episode: "The Letter L"	
2023	RuPaul's Drag Race All Stars: Untucked	Herself	Episode: "All Stars Untucked: The Letter L"	
2023	Physical	Kelly	Season 3	

== Music videos ==
Year	Title	Artist	Notes	Ref.
1999	"She's Got Issues"	The Offspring		
2002	"Idiot Boyfriend"	Jimmy Fallon		
2008	"Why Do You Let Me Stay Here?" (version one)	She & Him		
2009	"Why Do You Let Me Stay Here?" (version two)	She & Him		
2010	"In the Sun"	She & Him		
2010	"Thieves"	She & Him		
2011	"Don't Look Back"	She & Him		
2012	"Hey Girl"	Herself		
2013	"I Could've Been Your Girl"	She & Him	Also director	
2014	"Stay Awhile"	She & Him		
2015	"On the Island"	Brian Wilson		
2020	"Not the End of the World"	Katy Perry		

== Video games ==
Year	Title	Role	Ref.
2007	Surf's Up	Lani Aliikai (voice)	

== Discography ==
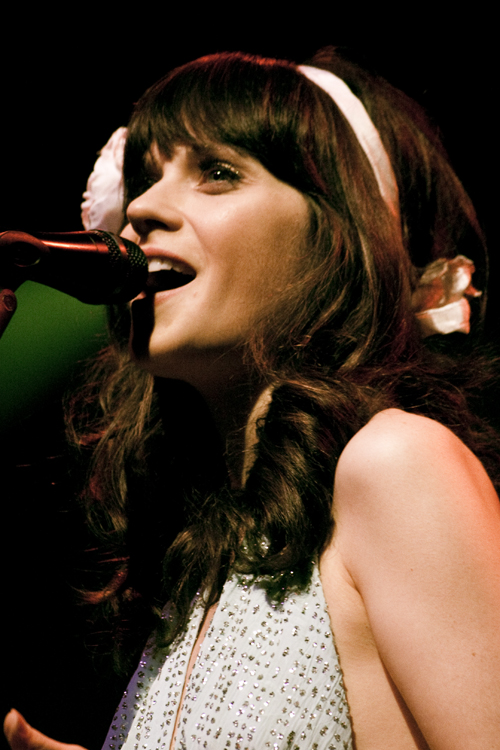
Deschanel performing in New York City in 2008

=== Soundtrack performances ===
Year	Title	Soundtrack album	Ref.
2003	"Baby, It's Cold Outside" (with Leon Redbone)	Elf	
2005	"In a Little While" (with Matthew Morrison)	Once Upon a Mattress	
2008	"Yes Man"; "Sweet Ballad"; "Uh-huh"; "Keystar" (with Von Iva); "Can't Buy Me Love" (with Jim Carrey); (Note: As member of fictional band Munchausen by Proxy.)	Yes Man	
2011	"A Very Important Thing to Do"; "Everything is Honey" (with Jim Cummings and Robert Lopez); "Finale" (with Jim Cummings, Robert Lopez and cast)	Winnie the Pooh	
2011	"Hey Girl" (original soundtrack)	New Girl	
2014	"Fallinlove2nite" cover (with Prince and 3rdeyegirl)	New Girl	
2015	"Bitch"	Rock the Kasbah	
2016	"Hello" "I'm Coming Out" "Mo Money Mo Problems" (with cast) ""Can't Stop the Feeling!" (with cast)	Trolls	

=== Guest album appearances ===
Year	Title	Album	Artist	Ref.
2007	"Chiquitita"	Open Your Heart EP	Lavender Diamond	
2007	"Slowly"; "Ask Her to Dance"	Nighttiming	Coconut Records	
2008	"The Next Messiah"; "Carpetbaggers"; "Trying My Best to Love You"; "Jack Killed Mom"	Acid Tongue	Jenny Lewis	
2009	"Never Had Nobody Like You"; "Rave On"	Hold Time	M. Ward	
2010	"Get on the Road"; "Point Me at Lost Islands"	The Place We Ran From	Tired Pony	
2011	"It's So Easy"	Listen to Me: Buddy Holly (tribute album)	Various artists	
2012	"Me and My Shadow"; "Sweetheart"	A Wasteland Companion	M. Ward	
2012	"The Hippie Girl" (with Ben Gibbard)	Chasing Away the Dots	Mike Coykendall	
2012	"Something's Rattling (Cowpoke)"	Former Lives	Benjamin Gibbard	
2015	"You're the Reason"	A mixtape from Ben Lee	Ben Lee	
