= Vix =

Vix may refer to:

== Places ==
- Vix, Côte-d'Or
  - Vix Grave of the Lady of Vix
- Vix, Vendée

== Others ==
- VIX, ticker symbol for the Chicago Board Options Exchange Volatility Index, sometimes referred to as the "Fear Index"
- Eurico de Aguiar Salles Airport, IATA code VIX
- Vitória, Brazil, also known as Vix
- Vienna Internet Exchange
- Vix (Victoria Perks), the lead singer of UK pop-punk band We've Got a Fuzzbox and We're Gonna Use It
- Vix Technology, an Australian-based technology company
- The VIX API from VMware allows automated management of virtualized computers
- Vix.com, a website formerly known as Batanga Media
- Vix Note, sent in 1919 by Entente delegate Fernand Vix to the government of the First Hungarian Republic
- Vix (streaming service) (ViX), a Spanish-language video streaming service owned by TelevisaUnivision

== See also ==
- Vicks
- Vixen (disambiguation)
