= Danny Wallace (humorist) =

Scottish comedian, writer, and presenter of radio and television

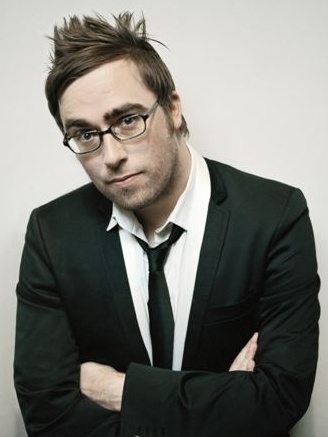
- Wallace in 2008
- Born: 16 November 1976 (age 49); Dundee, Scotland
- Citizenship: United Kingdom
- Education: Media studies; University of Westminster
- Occupations: Broadcaster; comedian; writer
- Years active: 1990–present
- Known for: Join Me; Yes Man; How to Start Your Own Country
- Spouse: Greta Elizabeth "Lizzie" Wallace (née McMahon)
- Website: dannywallace.com

Daniel Frederick Wallace (born 16 November 1976) is a British comedian, writer, and presenter of radio and television. His notable works include the books Join Me and Yes Man, narrating Thomas Was Alone, voice acting as Shaun Hastings in the Assassin's Creed game series, and fronting the TV series How to Start Your Own Country.

== Early life ==
Wallace was born in Dundee, Scotland. He is half Swiss. He attended Park Place Primary School, also growing up in Loughborough and Bath, England. He began writing reviews for video game magazines aged 13 for school work experience: a reviewer had become ill and so Wallace was given the opportunity to review a game. At 18, he started writing comedy, mainly through the magazine Comedy Review. He specialised in media studies at the University of Westminster.

== Career ==
At 22, he became a BBC producer. He was part of the production team behind British Comedy Award-winning Dead Ringers, the original producer of The Mighty Boosh, and creator and producer of Ross Noble Goes Global.

As a journalist, Wallace has worked for The Scotsman, The Guardian, The Independent, Elle, Cosmo, The Times and other publications.

From 2007, Wallace wrote a column in the free weekly magazine ShortList.

In June 2014, Wallace was awarded an honorary degree from the University of Dundee, in the city where he was born.

Politically, Wallace is a supporter of the Labour Party.

== Books ==
As an author, Wallace's best-selling books have been translated into more than a dozen languages. Danny's first book was published in 2003, titled 'Join Me'

=== Are You Dave Gorman? ===
In 1999, Wallace challenged comedian Dave Gorman, who at the time was his flatmate, to find 54 other people called Dave Gorman ("one for every card in the pack, including the Jokers"). Wallace accompanied Gorman on his quest and the men created Are You Dave Gorman?, an award-winning comedy stage show about what happened during their journey. A BBC series, also co-written and co-produced by Wallace, followed, as did a book, written by both men.

=== Join Me ===
In 2003, Wallace's book Join Me was published. The book explains how he "accidentally started a 'cult'" called Join Me.

The movement would go global, with each member committing to undertaking one random act of kindness for a stranger every Friday ("Good Fridays"). Tens of thousands joined. Join Me celebrates "Karmageddon 10" in December 2011.

The movement is now generally referred to as the "Karma Army", although members are still typically "Joinees". He became a minor celebrity in Belgium whilst on his quest for Joinees. While on a book tour through America, Wallace was dubbed a "Generation X legend" by the Wisconsin State Journal.

=== Random Acts of Kindness: 365 Ways To Make the World A Nicer Place ===
Wallace next wrote a short book called Random Acts of Kindness: 365 Ways To Make the World A Better Place, with the help of submissions from Joinees.

It includes many humorous Random Acts of Kindness (RAoK) ideas, such as "Contradict Demeaning Graffiti", and "Make An Old Man Very Happy."

=== Yes Man ===
Wallace's second solo book, Yes Man, was published in July 2005. In it, he describes how he spent six months "saying Yes where once I would have said No", to make his life more interesting and positive. In this book he shows the tribulations and mischief that he got up to while he said yes to any question or proposal. The book was described as "one of those rare books that actually has the potential to change your life" by the San Francisco Bay Guardian and as "a fascinating book and a fascinating experiment" by David Letterman.

A film adaptation of Yes Man was developed with Warner Bros. and stars Jim Carrey and Zooey Deschanel. It was released on 19 December 2008 in the US and 26 December 2008 in the UK. Wallace appeared on screen in a cameo in a bar scene in the last ten minutes of the film, holding a British pint glass. The film made almost $100 million at the US Box Office. The critical reception was mixed. For example, when the DVD of Yes Man was released in April 2009, The Independent gave it two stars. Two days later, its sister paper, The Independent on Sunday, gave it 4 out of 5.

=== Danny Wallace and the Centre of the Universe ===
Danny Wallace and the Centre of the Universe was published in 2006. It is linked with World Book Day which in 2006 was on Thursday 2 March. It tells the story of Wallace's trip to Idaho, to visit a manhole cover in a small town, whose residents have proclaimed it the centre of the universe. The cover identifies it as a "Quick Read"; the price and length of the book have been curbed to encourage people who may not often read books to purchase it.

=== Friends Like These ===
Wallace's book, Friends Like These, was released on 3 July 2008, and tells the story of how he spent a summer trying to track down his school friends. The film rights went to Miramax and a screenplay is currently underway.

=== Awkward Situations for Men ===
Wallace's book Awkward Situations for Men, was released on 3 June 2010 and reached number 3 in the best-sellers list. The follow-up, More Awkward Situations for Men, was released on 30 June 2011. A sitcom pilot, starring Wallace as himself, was produced in 2010 but was not aired.

=== Charlotte Street ===
Wallace's debut novel, Charlotte Street, was released on 10 May 2012 under Ebury Publishing. It follows journalist Jason Priestley's search to find a woman who has dropped a disposable camera.

=== Who Is Tom Ditto? ===
Who Is Tom Ditto?, was released on 24 April 2014. It is a comic novel about a radio newsreader's search for his missing girlfriend.

=== F You Very Much: Understanding the Culture of Rudeness—and What We Can Do About It ===
Also published under the title "F*** You Very Much: The surprising truth about why people are so rude".

=== Hamish and the PDF series ===
Written by Wallace, this children's book series follows the adventures of ten-year-old Hamish Ellerby as he faces off against terrifying monsters, with the help of his best friend Alice and the other members of the PDF (Pause Defence Force). Every book is illustrated by Jamie Littler.

=== Somebody Told Me... ===
Wallace's 2024 book Somebody Told Me... investigates conspiracy theories and disinformation, and includes his meeting with Alex Jones.

== Television and radio ==
Wallace filmed a pilot episode for his own American television sitcom in 2010, commissioned by ABC and made by Warner Bros. Television. In it, Wallace plays himself ("Danny"), a writer who moves to San Francisco to support his wife's new job, and finds that he doesn't quite fit in. The pilot also starred Tony Hale (Arrested Development) and Laura Prepon (That '70s Show). It was directed by acclaimed director Andy Ackerman, who had previously directed almost 90 episodes of Seinfeld.

A second script was later commissioned for the 2011 American TV pilot season. The pilot made it to the final shortlist for the 2011 American TV pilot season; however, ABC wanted to shoot the show in front of a studio audience, which Wallace had not planned for. ABC instead commissioned another script, and Awkward Situations for Men was not commissioned for the 2011 season.

Of his work in Hollywood, Empire magazine said, "Hollywood must be gazing in wonder at the walking high-concept machine that is Wallace."

Wallace began television presenting in 2004. In 2005, Wallace presented a documentary comedy, How to Start Your Own Country, in which he started his own micronation – "Lovely" – in his London flat. The series charted his journey around the world exploring citizenship and what a country actually is. He has described it as "a way of hiding politics in entertainment".

Beginning late August 2005 he co-presented on BBC One's Saturday night show He's Having a Baby with Davina McCall, which ran at the same time as his BBC Two series, How to Start Your Own Country. The latter won two BAFTAs in early 2006.

=== XFM and Radio X ===
From 9 February 2008 to October 2008, Wallace presented a weekly show at 10 am – 2 pm on Saturday mornings at XFM London (now Radio X), taking over the old Ricky Gervais slot.

Wallace and co-presenter Richard Glover decided to leave after they were asked to pre-record their show instead of broadcast live, which would have taken away from the interactive nature of the show.

On 1 August 2011, Wallace returned to XFM London to present the weekday breakfast show.

The show eventually gained a cult following, and this was recognised by making the show operate as if it were a totalitarian state. Listeners would often text in calling themselves 'confirmed listeners', and the show eventually become known as 'The Important Broadcast'. Wallace eventually used terminology such as 'listenerpad' and 'listening partner', to imply and joke about state-like rules for joining in with the show. With Producer Dave the show had a number of features which caught on:

- 'Good news' (where presenters and listeners shared things since the last broadcast that either made them feel good or not so bad in life) ending with the phrase: "that's not just good news, that's great news".
- 'Snap My Pitch Up' – The famous guests and entertainers were presented with pitches for their participation films or shows with titles typically based around the stars' name.
- 'Quizface' – A series of nonsensical quiz formats which would be portrayed as adventures or needlessly complex game shows, throughout which bemused and uninformed listeners and participants would be reminded that 'You should know the rules by now'. It was originally conceived as a one off, but Wallace and Matt Dyson eventually kept making the joke make less sense and more funny. Wallace claimed to listeners that they could find the rules on their issued 'listenerpads' or by reading the (not-real) London Gazette. Each quiz was eventually won by completing the 'well-known phrase', 'We are XFM'. The quiz was awarded a prestigious Sony Bronze Award in the category of 'Best Quiz'
- Five minute listener bans – Received by listeners who shared content that receives playful disapproval. Listeners would be told, as if sternly, as if Wallace had control, that they were not allowed to listen for five minutes.
- Sparky Wednesday – Every third Wednesday as a celebration of "the best of Britain's tradesmen".
- The Dog House – A parody of The Good Life, in which the presenters and listeners would compare modern woes of what they had done wrong to their friends or partners.
- The Showbiz Update – Satirical coverage of showbusiness stories from tabloid newspapers, and Wallace discussing stories often portrayed with opinion pieces in pure basic facts, and the team often humorously analysed and dissected the stories as if they were major news stories.
- Angry Nerds – Using the 'Angry Birds' theme tune in the background, the team and listeners shared anger and 'observational comedy about things no-one else notices'.

In December 2012, it was announced that Wallace would be leaving the Breakfast Show, and he was replaced by Jon Holmes. When XFM relaunched as Radio X, the show was taken over by Chris Moyles

Wallace returned to Radio X in January 2018 in the Sunday 11am - 1pm slot vacated by Russell Brand. He is joined by former XFM Breakfast Show contributor Stephen Ferdinando, and 'Producer Joe' Attewell. Similar idiosyncrasies to previous incarnations of the show are employed, while new features include:

- Dinner Winner – 2 cast members go head to head recounting their dinners, often in a humorous fashion. The third, non-participating member, adjudicates and declares a winner using a points based system. The winner will then go head to head with that week's judge, unless the outcome is a draw, in which case the following week sees a re-match. 2020's Champion was Stephen Ferdinando. 2021's Champion is contested due to dishonesty on behalf of Stephen Ferdinando on whether he paid for a meal or not.
- Small Talk Texter – the audience is invited to 'warm-up' by contributing answers to a simple small-talk based question, often based on topical events
- Explain That – Contributor Stephen Ferdinando is asked to assess a paranormal incidence and offer an explanation as to how it came about, usually instead declaring the story 'nonsense' and being berated by the rest of the team for failing at the task he's been given
- Tell Me Something I Don't Know – The three members of the team try to out do each other with facts they have discovered during the week that the others may not know. Being awarded points based on who knows it and who does not.
- The No-Biz – Items from the "showbiz" sections of tabloids that are not particularly newsworthy. Frequently revolving around Paul Hollywood (56) and his incumbent partner.

=== Video games ===
Wallace lent his face and voice to the 2009 video game sequel Assassin's Creed II where he played Shaun Hastings – an historian and modern day member of the Assassin Order. He was sought after for the part by developer Ubisoft when he went to the BAFTA video game awards with a friend. He reprised his role in Assassin's Creed: Brotherhood, Assassin's Creed: Revelations, Assassin's Creed III, Assassin's Creed IV: Black Flag, Assassin's Creed Unity, Assassin's Creed Syndicate, Assassin's Creed Valhalla, Assassin's Creed Nexus VR, and the audio drama Assassin's Creed: Gold. Each game has sold more than 8 million units apiece.

He also narrated the 2012 indie game, Thomas Was Alone. Wallace's role as narrator won the "Performance" category at the 9th British Academy Video Games Awards, while the game itself was nominated in the "Story" category.

In 2015, he voiced Alan in the indie game Volume, his second collaboration with Thomas Was Alone creator Mike Bithell.

=== Other work ===
Wallace has written for and presented television shows such as Danny Wallace's Hoax Files (Sky One), Conspiracies (Sky One), School's Out (BBC1), and in 2006 he took over from Phillip Schofield as co-presenter of BBC1's Test the Nation.

He appeared in Channel 4's The IT Crowd (Series 1 Episode 2) in a role his friend, writer and director Graham Linehan, originally planned to play himself. Wallace was asked to do it when Linehan realised simultaneously appearing in and directing the episode would be tricky.

Wallace was the first person in 43 years to be asked to front an episode of flagship BBC science series Horizon. The episode aired on 10 October 2006. In it, Wallace attempted to prove the hypothesis that chimps could be considered 'people' too.

On 16 December 2008, he presented his second episode of Horizon on BBC Two. Where's My Robot?. In it, Wallace travelled the world to meet roboticists and ask them, simply: "Where's my robot?". The documentary is based on the belief in the 1980s that by the next century personal robots would be available and be an accepted part of society. Wallace investigates why it did not become a reality and whether it will in the future.

Wallace presented a series of reality show Castaway on BBC One. The series was live from Great Barrier Island in New Zealand for three months, beginning 9 March 2007, and featured a spin-off BBC Three series and BBCi webisodes.

On 4 January 2008, Wallace appeared on a celebrity spin-off episode of the BBC's Mastermind. His specialist subject was the Ghostbusters films; he did not get a single question wrong on the subject, but came third with 27 points.

He appeared on Friday Night with Jonathan Ross on 20 June 2008 to discuss his books, film and television projects.

On 31 January 2009, he stood in for Adam and Joe on BBC 6 Music. He followed this up by another stint on 6Music, standing in for Shaun Keaveny's breakfast show for two weeks in May 2009. He stood in for Adam and Joe again for seven weeks over the summer of 2009 with XFM DJ Pete Donaldson and was again asked to take over from Adam & Joe during their recent hiatus.

He was a regular presenter on the National Lottery live draw on BBC 1, as well as the National Television Awards Backstage Live.

In October 2012, American television network ABC added a comedy project to be co-produced by Wallace entitled Man & Boy.

Since 2016, Wallace has provided commentary for Channel 5's coverage of The World's Strongest Man Contest.

In 2021, Wallace created a website called "Assembly" (assemblehere.co.uk). "It's a place for men who say nice things behind people's backs, who can cook a decent omelette but want to cook a better one, who'd prefer to be funny, but can stretch to serious."

== Filmography ==
=== Films ===
- Yes Man

=== Television ===
- 8 Out of 10 Cats
- Castaway 2007
- The Dave Gorman Collection
- Dave Gorman's Important Astrology Experiment
- How to Start Your Own Country
- The IT Crowd – series 1, episode 2
- Heston's Feasts – series 1, episode 4
- Richard Bacon's Beer & Pizza Club – series 1, episode 4
- Would I Lie to You? – series 3, episode 7

== Charity support ==
Wallace is a patron of the charity Build Africa. Wallace is also the patron of The Baked Bean Museum of Excellence, which he also officially opened in 2009.

== Bibliography ==
- Gorman, Dave; Wallace, Danny (4 July 2002). Are You Dave Gorman?. Ebury Press. ISBN 978-0-09-188471-0.
- Wallace, Danny (3 June 2004). Join Me. Ebury Press. ISBN 978-0-09-189582-2.
- Wallace, Danny (4 November 2004). Random Acts of Kindness: 365 Ways to Make the World a Nicer Place. Ebury Press. ISBN 978-0-09-190175-2.
- Wallace, Danny (6 April 2006). Yes Man. Ebury Press. ISBN 978-0-09-189674-4.
- Wallace, Danny (3 July 2008). Friends Like These. Ebury Press. ISBN 978-0-09-189676-8.
- Wallace, Danny (4 December 2008). Yes Man (film tie-in). Ebury Press. ISBN 978-0-09-192790-5.
- Wallace, Danny (3 June 2010). Awkward Situations for Men. Ebury Press. ISBN 978-0-09-193757-7.
- Wallace, Danny (30 June 2011). More Awkward Situations for Men. Ebury Press. ISBN 978-0-09-194130-7.
- Wallace, Danny (12 March 2015). Hamish and the Worldstoppers. Simon & Schuster Children's UK. ISBN 9781471123887.
- Wallace, Danny (11 February 2016). Hamish and the Neverpeople. Simon & Schuster Children's UK. ISBN 9781471123924.
- Wallace, Danny (9 March 2017). Hamish and the GravityBurp. Simon & Schuster Children's UK. ISBN 9781471147135.
- Wallace, Danny (8 March 2018). Hamish and the Baby BOOM!. Simon & Schuster Children's UK. ISBN 9781471167829.
- Wallace, Danny (4 October 2018). Hamish and the Terrible Terrible Christmas and Other Stories. Simon & Schuster Children's UK. ISBN 9781471176579.
- Wallace, Danny (18 April 2019). Hamish and the Monster Patrol. Simon & Schuster Children's UK. ISBN 9781471167867.
- Wallace, Danny (9 May 2024). Somebody Told Me... Ebury Press. ISBN 978-0-09-191905-4.
- Henry Tudor: The Incredible Diaries of Me!. 27 August 2026. ISBN 978-1-3985-5441-2.
