= Pin Up Girl =

Pin Up Girl may refer to:

- Pin-up model
- Pin Up Girl (film), a 1944 American musical film starring Betty Grable
- The Pin Up Girls, a girl group and dance troupe
