= Vixen (disambiguation) =

A vixen is a female fox.

Vixen or Vixens may also refer to:

== Characters ==
- Vixen (character), a DC Comics superhero character
- Vixen (stock character), a mysterious sexually attractive woman
- Vixen, one of Santa Claus's reindeer, as named in "The Night Before Christmas"
- Vixen, comic book character in the Marvel UK franchise, enemy of Captain Britain and Psylocke
- Amaya Jiwe, TV series character also known as Vixen, see List of Legends of Tomorrow characters
- Mari McCabe, web series character also known as Vixen, from Vixen (web series)

== Computing ==
- Osborne Vixen, a 1984 personal computer
- Vixen (video game), a 1988 platform game
- Vixen 357, a 1992 Japanese Mega Drive strategy game
- The originally intended name of the VIC-20, a 1980 home computer

== Film and series ==
- Vixen Media Group, adult film production company based in Los Angeles, California
- Vixen (web series), a 2015 web series on the DC Comics superhero character
- Vixen!, a 1968 film by Russ Meyer
- Vixens (manga), a Japanese erotic OVA series
- The Vixen (film), a 1916 film starring Theda Bara

== Literature ==
- Vibe Vixen, a women's magazine, spinoff of Vibe magazine
- Vixen, a 2000 novel by Hoa Pham
- Vixen, an 1879 novel by Mary Elizabeth Braddon
- The Vixens, a 1947 novel by Frank Yerby

== Military ==
- de Havilland Sea Vixen, a 1950s–1960s British fighter aircraft
- HMS Vixen, various British Royal Navy ships
- Mission of the Vixen or Seizure of the Vixen or Vixen Incident, an 1836 conflict between UK and Russia
- Operation Vixen, a series of British nuclear bomb safety tests
- USS Vixen, various ships in the US Navy
- Vickers Vixen, a biplane produced in small numbers in the 1920s
- Vixen, a prototype variant of the Fox armoured reconnaissance vehicle

== Music ==
=== Bands ===
- Vixen (band), an all-female hard rock band formed in 1980
- Vixen, a rock band formed in 1982 featuring Marty Friedman

=== Albums ===
- Vixen (Gloria Jones album), 1976
- Vixen (Vixen album), 1988

=== Songs ===
- "Vixen", a 2018 song by Ayesha Erotica
- Megitsune (aka "Vixen") 2013 song by Babymetal
- "Vixen", a 2018 song by Destroy Boys
- "Vixen", a song by Michael Fall from the 2013 album Turn On Your Radio
- "Vixen", a 1997 B-side song by Millencolin
- "Vixen", a 2018 song by Vancouver Sleep Clinic

== People ==
- Jenny Ryan, one of the Chasers on the UK game show The Chase, nicknamed "The Vixen"
- Lucy Vixen (born 1989), British glamour model
- Melody Trouble Vixen, female professional wrestler from the Gorgeous Ladies of Wrestling
- The Vixen (drag queen) (born 1990) U.S. drag queen
- Vixen, an alias of Ruth Crisp
- Vixen Romeo, lead vocalist and founder of the group The Pin Up Girls
- Yvonne Ekwere (born 1987) Nigerian TV personality nicknamed "Vixen"

== Places ==
- Vixen, Louisiana, a community in the United States
- Vixen Tor, a tor in Dartmoor, England, UK

== Sports ==
- Guiseley A.F.C. Vixens, an English women's football team
- Leeds City Vixens L.F.C., an English women's football team
- Melbourne Vixens, an Australian women's netball team
- Minnesota Vixen, an American women's football team

== Transportation ==
- TVR Vixen, a hand-built sports car manufactured between 1967 and 1972
- SkyStar Vixen, a kit-built airplane
- Vixen (RV), a 1980s recreational vehicle, built by Vixen Motor Company
- Vixen (telescopes), a Japanese astronomy equipment manufacturer
- VIXEN, the callsign of airline Sunset Aviation, see List of airline codes (S)

== Other uses ==
- AVN vixen of the year, an award for adult video
- Video vixen, a female model who appears in hip-hop-oriented music videos

== See also ==
- Fox (disambiguation)
