= If All the Stars Were Pretty Babies =

US musical group

If All the Stars Were Pretty Babies was a cabaret act featuring American actresses Zooey Deschanel and Samantha Shelton. They performed around Los Angeles, California for a short time in the early 2000s.

The name of the act was taken from the title of a song written in 1926 by Fred Fisher and Billy Rose. The band featured musical director Graham Jackson on piano, drummer Steve DeLollis, double bassist Gary Viggers, Brian Walsh on clarinet and saxophone, and George Dudley on saxophone and flute. Former members included Mami Arizono, Kat Edwards, and Jason Bernstein.

One video sample of this cabaret act was posted on YouTube on May 13, 2007.
