= Karen Dawn =

American animal rights advocate

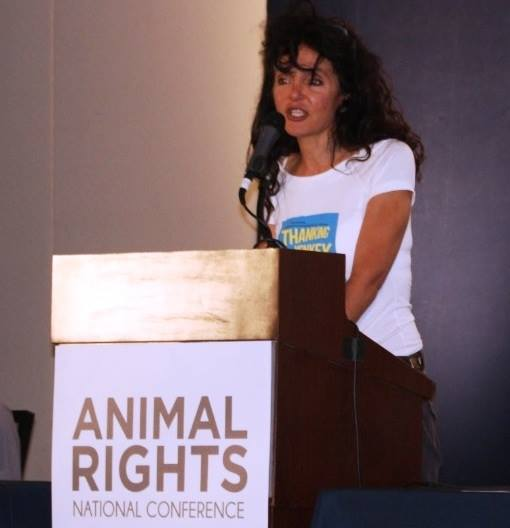
- Education: University of New South Wales
- Occupation: Animal rights activist

Karen Dawn is an American animal rights and welfare advocate and writer. She's known as the founder of DawnWatch, author of “Thanking the Monkey: Rethinking the way we Treat Animals,” and for numerous newspaper and magazine pieces, as well as for her well-publicized turkey rescues.

== Biography ==
Karen Dawn was born in the United States and grew up and was schooled in Australia. She studied at the University of New South Wales, earning a science degree with a major in psychology. Dawn had her first experience working with the media as a news researcher and writer for Australia's national nightly news magazine show The 7.30 Report, on ABC. Dawn moved to New York City and pursued her interest in music throughout the early 1990s as a singer-songwriter. In 1999 she moved to Los Angeles and founded DawnWatch – the Daily Animal World News Watch – which became a nonprofit organization in 2016. She spent two decades in Pacific Palisades where she became known as the Turkey Lady for her well-publicized Thanksgiving turkey rescues. She left for Santa Barbara in early 2020. She is now based largely in Austin, Texas.

== Animal rights spokesperson ==
Dawn is an animal rights spokesperson who speaks at national animal rights conferences and the annual "Taking Action for Animals" conference in Washington DC. She has appeared on major TV networks discussing animal issues and is a speaker at colleges.

Dawn's career in animal rights began in 1999 when she started the DawnWatch.com list serve, which she created to encourage activists to stay in contact with the media.

Dawn was invited to serve on the voting committee for the Genesis Awards a position which she held from 2001 to 2004. In 2006 she returned to the Genesis Awards voting committee as the print consultant.

Her piece "Best Friends Need Shelter, Too" was published in The Washington Post and she was subsequently interviewed for a New York Times article about the media coverage of displaced pets in the aftermath of Hurricane Katrina. A year later she participated in an on-air follow-up — a one-hour program on Washington Post Radio devoted to the Katrina Animal Disaster and what was learned from it with regard to the need for disaster preparedness and policy changes.

Dawn was an official spokesperson for California's Proposition 2, a 2008 election ballot initiative that changed the standards for confining farm animals.

On May 17, 2008, Dawn was presented with the Farm Sanctuary's Outstanding Activist for Farm Animals Award. The award was presented at the Farm Sanctuary 2008 Gala by Dawn's friends, actress Emily Deschanel and Skinny Bitch author Rory Freedman

In 2024 Dawn started appearing regularly on the Mark Thompson Show podcast discussing animal issues in the news.

=== Pit bull advocate ===
Dawn is an advocate for pit bulls and was featured in a Los Angeles Times front-page story as a "passionate defender" of the breed. But she also fully supports the need for pit bull spay-neuter legislation, even testifying in favor of such legislation in a California Senate committee hearing in Sacramento. The bill, SB861, was signed into law in 2006. It allows for breed-specific spay-neuter local ordinances but "prohibits cities and counties from banning any specific breed of dog."

=== Turkey rescue ===
Dawn may be most widely known for her annual Thanksgiving turkey rescue. It garners much media attention and was picked up by the Associated Press for Thanksgiving 2012. In a radio blog that aired on Washington Post Radio on Thanksgiving Day 2006, Dawn explains that she met a turkey for the first time in 2000 at the Poplar Spring Animal Sanctuary in Washington DC. She says that she was surprised that the turkey, Olivia, was so friendly and gentle and that when she crawled into Dawn's lap and fell asleep, Dawn "fell in love."

She first brought two live turkeys, who had been destined for slaughter, into her home for Thanksgiving 2009. They were later retired to the Animal Acres sanctuary in Acton, California. The Los Angeles Times did a spread on that effort, printed on the front page of the California section under the heading "Hold the turkey, please: A vegan Thanksgiving – where the birds are friends, not feast." Dawn told ABC World News Now, during an interview (at the time of her third annual turkey rescue) that she had done the original rescue largely as a publicity stunt in order to garner that Los Angeles Times story. But the next year she missed having live turkeys, and she since has done an annual rescue because, as she told CNN's Headline News anchor Jane Velez-Mitchell, she realized that having the turkeys in her home over Thanksgiving is "A fun way to present a serious message about health, about animal welfare, and about the environment."

The media coverage for the turkey rescue has included serious messages: The ABC World News Now story from 2010 shows a slaughterhouse video of turkeys hanging upside down on a conveyor belt while Dawn comments, "Something I think very few people would be aware of is that turkeys are not covered under the federal humane slaughter laws. The ironic thing about the slaughter laws in this country is that they actually exempt 95% of the animals who are slaughtered." (She is referring to all poultry, plus rabbits.) The Thanksgiving 2012 coverage from Dawn's local ABC station showed the reporter, Elex Michaelson, petting a turkey and talking about how much they enjoy the human touch. Dawn tells viewers that "Turkeys are a lot more adorable than they are delicious" and that "turkey day is a lot more fun when the turkeys are alive and well."

Almost all of the media coverage includes video and photos of the turkeys getting a welcome bath and blowdry. Dawn posts an annual turkey rescue video with bath and blow-dry scenes on her YouTube channel.

== Radio hosting ==
Dawn has hosted animal issues talk shows on Houston's Pacifica station, KPFT and on the Los Angeles Pacifica station, KPFK, interviewing renowned guests including feminists Gloria Steinem and Catharine MacKinnon, Nobel Prize Laureate JM Coetzee, philosopher Peter Singer, musician Moby, and Whole Foods Market CEO John Mackey.

== Writing ==
Dawn has written opinion pieces published in The Washington Post, the Los Angeles Times, New York's Newsday and the UK Guardian. She contributed to "Terrorists or Freedom Fighters: Reflections on the Liberation of Animals", a 2004 anthology edited by Steve Best and Anthony Nocella, to "In Defense of Animals: The Second Wave" edited by Peter Singer, and to “JM Coetzee and Ethics: Philosophical Perspectives on Literature” edited by Anton Leist and Peter Singer.

She wrote numerous blogs for the Huffington Post and The Dodo.

Dawn's first book, Thanking the Monkey: Rethinking the Way We Treat Animals, was published in May 2008. She promotes animal rights with a fun and friendly image, stating, "There's no reason that animal rights can't be fun and inviting. For heaven's sake—gin's vegan!" Thanking the Monkey was included on a Washington Post list that cited it as one of the best books of 2008.

=== Works ===
- Thanking the Monkey: Rethinking the Way We Treat Animals. Harper Paperbacks, 2008. ISBN 0-06-135185-7

=== Op-eds ===
- Dogs Can Get by Just Fine on a Vegetarian Diet. Los Angeles Times. December 27, 2017.
- No Good Options for P-45. Los Angeles Times. December 6, 2016.
- Suffering by the numbers: If you give up red meat but continue eating fish and chicken you may end up increasing animal cruelty. With Peter Singer. Los Angeles Times. October 16, 2016.
- Why Do We Keep Gorillas Behind Bars? With Peter Singer. Los Angeles Times. June 5, 2016.
- Turkeys have a Seat at the Table. Santa Monica Daily Press. November 23, 2011.
- The choice isn't seals or people. Los Angeles Times. December 4, 2007.
- Tale of a Turkey who Changed Thanksgiving. Washington Post Radio. Aired November 23, 2006.
- Shameful policy caused many pets' deaths. New York Newsday. September 15, 2005.
- Best Friends Need Shelter, Too. Washington Post. September 10, 2005.
- Got milk? You've got problems. Los Angeles Times. August 13, 2005.
- Gandhi's way won't do: Animal rights activists do not want to resort to violence but many see it as the only option. The Guardian. September 5, 2004.
- Commentary; Echoes of Abu Ghraib in Chicken Slaughterhouse. With Peter Singer. Los Angeles Times. July 25, 2004.
- When Slaughter Makes Sense. With Peter Singer. New York Newsday. February 8, 2004.
- Back at the Ranch, a Horror Story. With Peter Singer. Los Angeles Times. December 1, 2003.
- There Should Be No Room for Cruelty to Livestock. With Peter Singer. Los Angeles Times. June 8, 2003.

=== Blogs ===
- Prince and His Animal Rights Legacy. The Huffington Post. April 25, 2016.
- McConaughey Missteps: Is Celebrity Shaming Good Animal Rights Activism? The Huffington Post. February 9, 2015.
- Why I Love the Go Daddy Puppy Commercial. The Huffington Post. January 29, 2015.
- Thanksgiving Turkey Rescue: Spa Day and Vegan Feast for Beautiful Birds (with video). The Huffington Post. November 21, 2014.
- Baby-Monkey Abuse Funded by Your Tax Dollars. The Huffington Post. August 7, 2014.
- Seventeen Years of Love with my Pit Bull, Paula. The Dodo. June 4, 2014.
- How Animal Welfare Advances Veganism and Animal Rights. The Huffington Post. March 17, 2014.
- Is Japan’s Dolphin Slaughter Really for Food? The Huffington Post. January 24, 2014.
- They Shoot Giraffes Don’t They? Why Marius’s Death Is No Surprise. The Huffington Post. January 11, 2014.
- Turkeys Get Spa Treatment and Love on Thanksgiving (with VIDEO). The Huffington Post. November 27, 2013.

=== Magazine pieces ===
- Why Kaepernick's Flavor Is Dairy-Free. The Progressive Magazine. December 17, 2020.
- Beyond the Slaughterhouse: A look at a new industry working to produce real meat without killing animals. The Progressive Magazine. Pages 47–50. October/November, 2019.
- The End of Animal Farming Is Not An Impossible Dream. The Progressive Magazine. September 13, 2018.
- Making Progress Against Animal Cruelty: An interview with Wayne Pacelle. The Progressive Magazine. July 2016.
- Making Animal Protection a Political Issue. The Progressive Magazine. December 2015.

=== Book chapter contributions ===
- Converging Convictions: Coetzee and His Characters on Animals. June 2010.
- From the Front Lines to the Front Page: An Analysis of ALF Media Coverage. June 2004.
- Moving the Media. August 2003.
