= Yes Man (book) =

Memoir by Danny Wallace

- The cover as seen on the hardback, first edition printing.
- Author: Danny Wallace
- Language: English
- Genre: Comedy, Memoir
- Published: 2005 (Simon Spotlight); 2006 (Ebury Press, UK paperback release); 2008 (Random House, film tie-in edition)
- Publication place: United Kingdom
- Media type: Print (Hardback and Paperback)
- Pages: 400 (original publication), 426 (2008 film tie-in edition)
- ISBN: 978-0-09-189674-4 (UK paperback release), 0-09-192790-0 (2008 film tie-in edition)
- OCLC: 58546326
- Dewey Decimal: 920.0421 B 22
- LC Class: CT788.W319 A3 2005

Yes Man is a memoir written by Danny Wallace based upon a year of the author's life, in which he chose to say "Yes" to any offers that came his way. It was also loosely adapted into the 2008 film Yes Man starring Jim Carrey.

== Plot summary ==
The cover as seen on the 2008 film tie-in republication paperback edition.

Danny Wallace, a freelance radio producer for the BBC in London, takes three simple words uttered by a stranger on a bus—"Say yes more"—as a challenge and says "yes" to everything for a year. He says "yes" to pamphleteers on the street, the credit card offers stuffing his mailbox and solicitations on the Internet. He attends meetings with a group that believes aliens built the pyramids in Egypt, says "yes" to every invitation to go out on the town and furthers his career by saying "yes" in meetings with executives.
