= Vixen Romeo =

American singer-songwriter

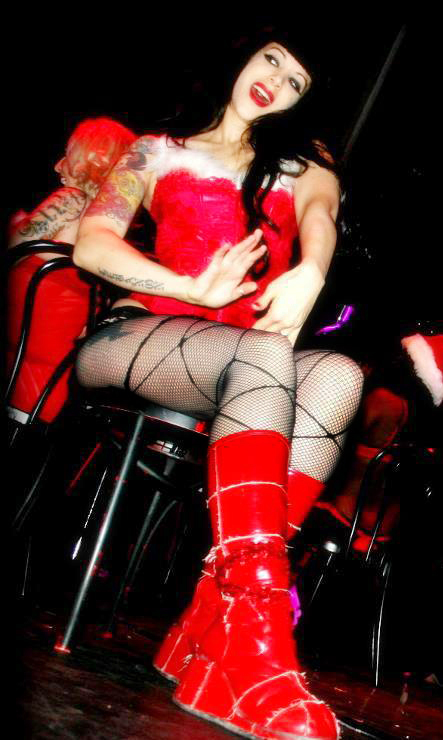

Background information
- Born: Julia D. Romeo; New York City
- Origin: New York City
- Genres: Hip Hop, Pop, R&B, Dance-pop
- Occupations: Singer, songwriter, Pinup model, dancer
- Years active: 2005–present
- Label: Indie
- Website: www.thepinupgirls.com

Vixen Romeo is an American singer-songwriter, dancer, pin-up model, author, and LGBTQ advocate. She is the lead vocalist and founder of the group The Pin Up Girls.

== Early life ==
Born Julia Diana, Romeo was born and raised in New York City in a Catholic household as the middle of three children. She was named after both of her great-grandmothers and is of Black Irish, Scottish and Lebanese descent. Romeo began dance at age 3 and taught dance for several years beginning at age 16 before starting her first Moulin Rouge inspired, hip hop style dance company while still in college at SUNY Purchase. A few years after graduating with a B.A. in Literature and the Visual Arts, she started The Pin Up Girls girl group and dance troupe. By 2014, divisions of The Pin Up Girls had been established in New York and Los Angeles.

== Performance image and career ==
Vixen Romeo is the face of The Pin Up Girls. She is also a pin-up model. Her image has been used on stickers, calendars, snowboards and apparel. She has also been the subject of many pieces of art. Romeo has naturally jet black hair and pale skin. Her makeup style consists of a cat-eye look with black or dark brown eyeliner along with bright red lipstick. She has appeared in the television shows Curl Girls and The L Word. Her performance and modeling attire features fishnets and red shoes.

== The Pin Up Girls ==
In 2005, Romeo formed the variety show The Pin Up Girls a.k.a. The Pin Up Girl Show. The Pin Up Girls began performing at Hollywood's most notorious venues such as The Viper Room, Key Club, Roxy, and The Whisky a Go Go. The girls quickly gained local attention with their girl-on-girl themed, tribal fusion belly dance, burlesque and hip hop routines. Romeo is the choreographer of the group. Between 2006 and 2008, The Pin Up Girls became poster girls for the lesbian scene, with performances for Curve, a guest appearance on LOGO network's reality series Curl Girls, a web series segment on AfterEllen, a performance for the LGBTQ community hosted by Jane Lynch, and performances in Margaret Cho's Sensuous Woman Show. In 2008, The Pin Up Girls first recorded single, "There She Goes...She's Real Fly", was picked up to be played on Showtime's hit lesbian series The L Word. In 2009, the music video for the song premiered on Logo (an MTV network), on New Now Next Pop Lab. This release was followed by the 2011 release of "Girl Candy," a music video filmed in New York and Los Angeles. Vixen Romeo also starred in "Pretty Things" directed by Joe LaRue, a film noir-style murder mystery music video released in June 2012.

Curve Magazine writer Jenny Sherwin wrote: “watching a Pin Up Girls show is like being thrust back to ancient times and then being catapulted to the future.” The group has also been described as "a sexier, gayer Pussycat Dolls."

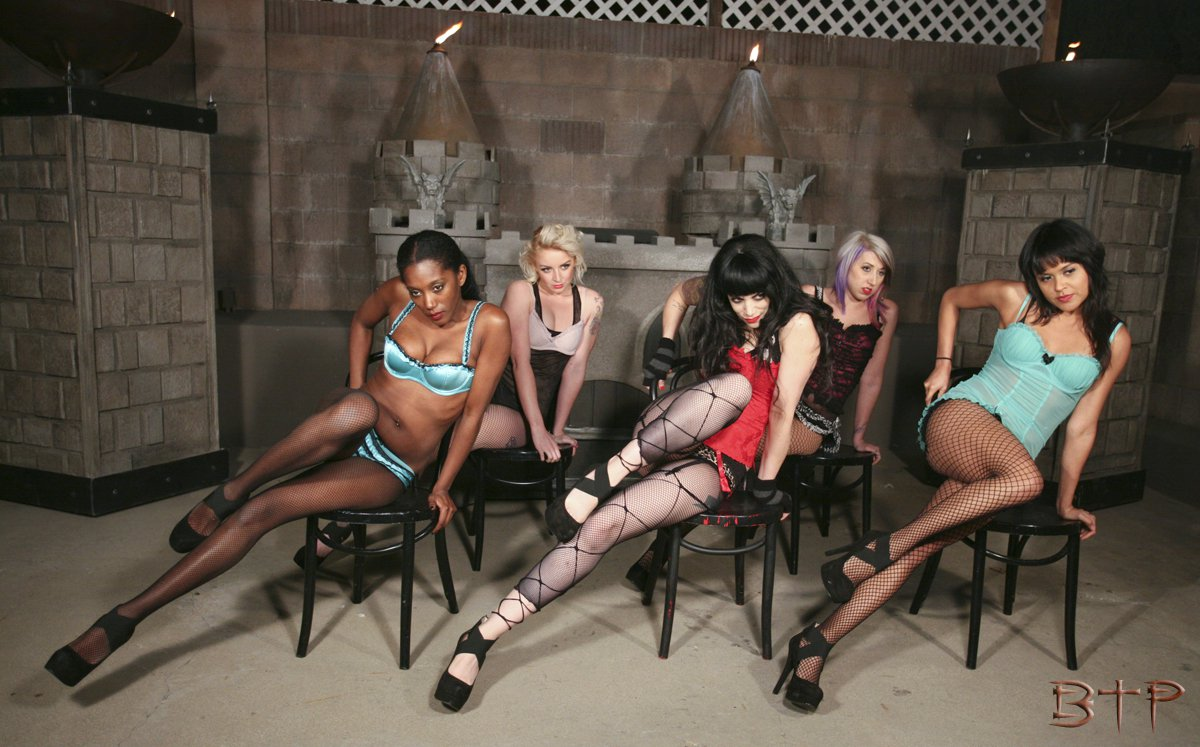
The Pin Up Girls Romeo filming

== Choreography ==
“Hailing from New York City, The Pin Up Girls’ founder, Julia, aka Vixen, is full of Big Apple attitude and moxie. Out and proud, this saucy, sexy vamp has mixed the glamour of old Hollywood and the glitz of modern-day Los Angeles to create the sexiest dyke dance troupe on the planet, The Pin Up Girls.” – Jenny Sherwin, Curve Magazine

Julia Romeo began dancing in New York at three years of age. Romeo is a master ballet, jazz, belly dance, and hip hop choreographer. She has taught and choreographed in New York, Connecticut, San Francisco, Los Angeles and Beirut. With her wide-ranging combination of burlesque, ballet, belly dance, fire tribal, hip hop, live zills and doumbek playing, Romeo quickly received media attention as the choreographer and head personality of The Pin Up Girls.

== Personal life and activism ==
In contrast to her outgoing stage persona, Romeo has described herself as reclusive, loyal, and family oriented. On October 27, 2007, she married fellow group member Top-69 DeWilde in a discreet Toronto, Canada wedding with close friends and family present.

Since the formation of her troupe in 2005, Romeo has advocated for women's rights, gay teen suicide prevention, and LGBTQ rights through performance and interviews. This included her participation in events campaigning against California's Prop 8, a proposed state amendment banning same-sex marriage.

== Writing career ==
Romeo has written two novels under a pen name, one of which was published by Regal Crest in August 2016. In a pre-publication review, Jennifer Pooley of HarperCollins wrote that Romeo's novels were "exquisite" and kept her "turning the pages." Vixen described one novel as a "young adult, paranormal, queer love story that takes place in the Pacific Southwest in the 1950s." While running The Pin Up Girls, Vixen enrolled in a writing program at UCLA and has expressed a desire to pursue a master's degree in literature.

== Discography ==
Singles

- "There She Goes...She's Real Fly" (2009)
- "Boushie B*tch" (2009)
- "Pin Me Up" (2010)
- "Girl Candy" (2011)
- "Pretty Things" (2012)

Other appearances

- The L Word; music in Season 5 Episode 7 (2008)
- AfterEllen.com (2008)
- New Now Next Pop Lab (2009)
- MTVMusic (2009)
