= Mary Jo Deschanel =

American actress

- Born: Mary Josephine Weir
- Occupation: Actress
- Years active: 1967–present
- Spouse: Caleb Deschanel (m. 1972)
- Children: Emily Deschanel; Zooey Deschanel

Mary Jo Deschanel (née Weir) is an American actress. She appeared in the film The Right Stuff (1983) and the television series Twin Peaks (1990–1991).

== Life and career ==
Deschanel was born Mary Josephine Weir. Her ancestry includes Irish, French, Swiss, Dutch, and English. After small television appearances, Deschanel's first major film role was portraying Annie Glenn, the wife of the astronaut John Glenn (played by Ed Harris), in the 1983 film The Right Stuff, an adaptation of the 1979 book of the same name by Tom Wolfe.

In 1984, Deschanel played Betty Fernandez, the remarried former wife of astronaut Dave Bowman (Keir Dullea), in the film 2010: The Year We Make Contact. She also played the role of Mrs. Howard in the 2000 film The Patriot (2000).

Deschanel played Eileen Hayward in the TV series Twin Peaks. She has also appeared in the TV series House in the episode "Simple Explanation" as Julia Kutner, the adoptive mother of recently deceased Dr. Lawrence Kutner.

Deschanel was featured a second time as the wife of a character played by Ed Harris, in the movie Winter Passing (2005), although she was only seen in a photograph on the wall. Despite never physically appearing in this movie, she did receive full billing in the credits as the character "Mary".

She has been married to cinematographer Caleb Deschanel since 1972. Her daughters, Emily and Zooey, are also actresses.

== Filmography ==
Year	Title	Role	Notes
1967	Run for Your Life	Mary Jo Potter	Episode: "Down with Willy Hatch"
1968	The High Chaparral	Ann	Episode: "Ride the Savage Land"
1968	The Wild Racers	Dancing Girl	
1968	The Outsider	Marcie	Episode: "There Was a Little Girl"
1969	Here Come the Brides	Peggy	Episode: "Mr. & Mrs. J. Bolt"
1969	Lancer	Trina Mason	Episode: "The Gifts"
1970	Paddy	Mary	
1983	The Right Stuff	Annie Glenn	
1984	2010: The Year We Make Contact	Betty Fernandez, Bowman's widow	
1986	Amazing Stories	Francine Gazetta	Episode: "Gather Ye Acorns"
1986	A Winner Never Quits	Mrs. Gary	Television film
1989	Midnight Caller	Sister Mary Catherine	Episode: "Someone to Love"
1990–1991	Twin Peaks	Eileen Hayward	11 episodes
1992	Twin Peaks: Fire Walk with Me	Eileen Hayward	Deleted scenes
1998	JAG	Victoria Ross	Episode: "Chains of Command"
2000	The Patriot	Mrs. Howard	
2002	Bark!	Betty	
2005	Law & Order: Trial by Jury	Julia Lonegan	Episode: "Day"
2005	Winter Passing	Mary	
2007	Breach	Vivian O'Neill	
2009	House	Julia	Episode: "Simple Explanation"
2009	My Sister's Keeper	Saleswoman	
2012	Ruby Sparks	Female Professor	
2014	Twin Peaks: The Missing Pieces	Eileen Hayward	
2017	Criminal Minds	Edith Lynch	Episode: "To a Better Place"
