= Samantha Shelton =

American actress and singer (born 1978)

- Born: Samantha Sky Shelton; November 15, 1978 (age 47); Los Angeles, California, U.S.
- Education: North Carolina School of the Arts; Los Angeles High School of the Arts
- Occupations: Actress, singer
- Years active: 1998–present
- Spouse: Steven Davis
- Children: 2
- Relatives: Marley Shelton (sister)

Samantha Sky Shelton (born November 15, 1978) is an American actress and singer.

== Early life ==
Samantha Shelton was born in Los Angeles, California, to director Christopher and Carol Stromme. She has three older sisters: Koren, Erin, and fellow actress Marley Shelton. Shelton studied acting while attending the North Carolina School of the Arts, and at the Los Angeles High School of the Arts.

== Career ==
=== Acting career ===
Her debut was as a waitress in the film Hairshirt, before several television guest roles, including a recurring role on Judging Amy. She had a supporting role in White Oleander as a pregnant girl in foster care. In 2003, she starred alongside her sister Marley in the independent film Moving Alan and she played the best friend roles in Learning Curves and Shopgirl. She also played a receptionist in the independent hit Ellie Parker. Some of her scenes were cut, but can be found in the 'special features' section of the DVD.

In early 2006, Shelton completed filming for the independent film Marcus.

In 2006, she starred in Monarch Cove, a TV series shown on Lifetime Network.

=== Music career ===
From 2001 to 2005, Shelton performed in the jazz cabaret act If All the Stars Were Pretty Babies with fellow actress Zooey Deschanel.
Shelton has released three EPs: Are You Kidding Around?, Cranky Moon and Sea Legs.

== Personal life ==
She is the sister of actress Marley Shelton. She is married to writer Steven Davis and has a son and a daughter.

== Filmography ==
=== Film ===
Year	Title	Role	Notes
1998	Hairshirt	Waitress #2	
2002	Sorority Boys	Makeup Salesgirl	
2002	White Oleander	Yvonne	
2003	Moving Alan	Emily Manning	
2003	Learning Curves	Cleo	
2005	Ellie Parker	Rainbow	
2005	Shopgirl	Loki	
2006	Marcus	Kate	
2007	Rise: Blood Hunter	LA Weekly Editor	
2009	Women in Trouble	Singer	
2009	The Tip		Short film
2011	Girl Walks into a Bar		
2011	6 Month Rule	Melissa	
2011	Maja and Ike	Maja	Short film

=== Television ===
Year	Title	Role	Notes
2000	Freaks and Geeks	Heidi Henderson	Episode: "We've Got Spirit"
2000–2001	Judging Amy	Evie Martell	7 episodes
2001	Gilmore Girls	Libby Doty	Episode: "Presenting Lorelai Gilmore"
2002	Roswell	Connie Griffin	Episode: "Crash"
2002	Charmed	Selena	Episode: "Witch Way Now?"
2002	Another Pretty Face	Hairdresser	Television film
2003	One Tree Hill	Reagan	Episode: "Pilot" (UNAIRED)
2003	CSI: Miami	Crystal Sherwood	Episode: "Hard Time"
2006	Gilmore Girls	Walker	Episode: "Bridesmaids Revisited"
2006	Conviction	Diane Kastle	3 episodes
2006	Monarch Cove	Kathy Foster	14 episodes
2007	Christmas at Cadillac Jack's	Billie	Television film
2008	House	Emmy	Episode: "Let Them Eat Cake"
2009	Eleventh Hour	Gretchen Morris	Episode: "Olfactus"
2009	The Cleaner	Jenny	Episode: "The Turtle & The Butterfly"
2009	Castle	Vixen	Episode: "Vampire Weekend"
2010	CSI: Crime Scene Investigation	Machine Gun Chick	Episode: "Take My Life, Please"
2011	Criminal Minds	Yolanda	Episode: "With Friends Like These"
2011	Bones	Antonia 'Toni' Lawrence	Episode: "The Twist in the Twister"
2012	Bob's Burgers	Amanda / Misty Gish (voice)	2 episodes
2013–2016	Bob's Burgers	Susan (voice)	4 episodes
2022	Central Park	Biker #2	3 episodes
