= Comedy Review =

Comedy Review was a British comedy magazine published by Future Publishing which ran for five issues in 1996. The editor was Andy Lowe with Damien Noonan as associate editor and Danny Wallace, then 19 years old, as staff writer.

According to its original cover strapline, the magazine covered "TV, Stand-up, Films, Radio, Theatre, Books, Videos and Other Amusing Media". The last of these was dropped from the strapline after one issue, and "Theatre" vanished after three. Regular items included a reprinted "Classic Interview", a transcript of a classic scene from a sitom or comedy film, dubbed "Masterpiece", an episode guide to a comedy TV series and a column by Peter Baynham.

== Summary ==
- Issue 1, "Debut Issue", March 1996. Cover star: Stephen Fry. Articles: The Fast Show; British sitcoms remade in the USA; A to Z of comedy songs; 20 Forgotten Sitcoms. Masterpiece: The fire drill scene from Fawlty Towers episode "The Germans". Classic interview: Bill Hicks.
- Issue 2, "Sofa Issue", April 1996. Cover star: Felix Dexter. Articles: The fifty funniest comedy films (This is Spinal Tap appears at number one), Pranks and hoaxes, Bugs and Drugs magazine. Masterpiece: a scene from Blackadder II. Classic Interview: Peter Cook as Sir Arthur Streeb-Greebling.
- Issue 3, "Red Issue", May 1996. Cover stars: Eddie Izzard, Neil Mullarkey, Stephen Frost and Suki Webster. Articles: British sitcom movies, Magic and comedy, Bernard Manning, people who work behind the scenes on TV comedy shows. Masterpiece: The "20 Jokes" scene from Roxanne. Classic interview: Graham Chapman.
- Issue 4, "Space Issue", June 1996. Cover star: Lee Evans. Articles: Viz magazine, Ventriloquism, Louis Theroux on British sitcoms, Stewart Lee on "Bizarre Cabaret". Masterpiece: three scenes from Monty Python's Life of Brian. Classic interview: Peter Sellers.
- Issue 5, "Manic Issue", July 1996. Cover star: Steve Coogan. Articles: Comedy in TV adverts, A night at The Comedy Store, TV warm-up men, Rich Hall, comedy obsessives. Masterpiece: a scene from Nuts in May. Classic interview: Keith Allen.
