= The Pin Up Girls =

- Origin: Los Angeles, California, United States
- Genres: Pop, hip hop, electronic, post-punk
- Years active: 2005–present
- Label: Indie
- Members: Vixen Romeo; C-69 DeWilde; Brown Sugar; Coco Puff; Cherry Lolita; Ryder Quinn; Miso Pretty; Porcelain Venus; Kittie Cat; Scarlette Mae; Cookie Gangsta; Tres Jolie
- Website: www.thepinupgirls.com

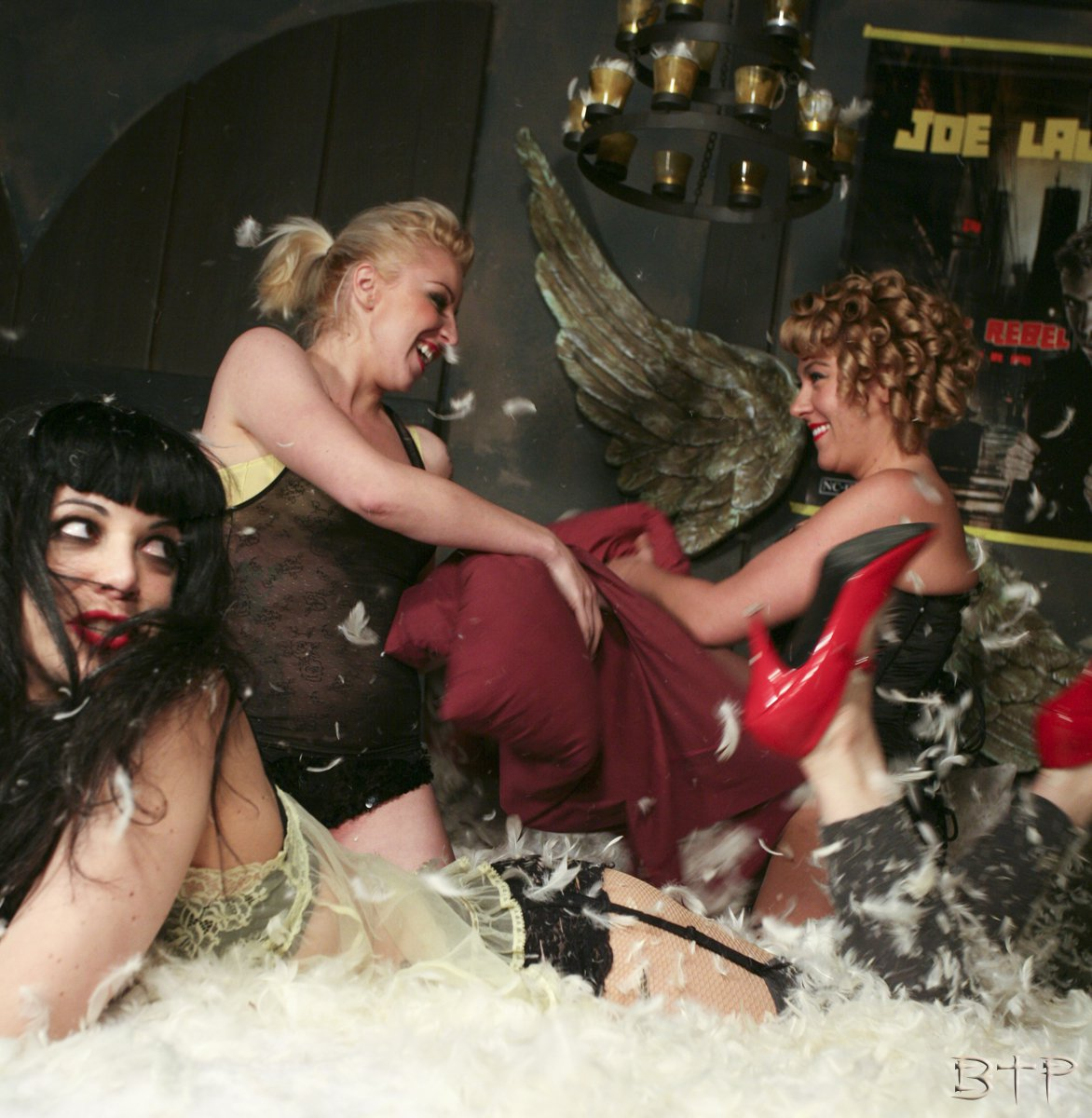
The Pin Up Girls Romeo

The Pin Up Girls are a girl group and dance troupe, founded by New York City native Vixen Romeo in 2005, which began as a burlesque-style performance group based in Los Angeles. Performing at Hollywood's most notorious venues such as The Viper Room Key Club and Roxy the girls quickly gained local attention with their girl-on-girl themed, tribal fusion belly dance, burlesque and hip hop routines. Between 2006 and 2008 The Pin Up Girls started to become poster girls for the lesbian scene with performances for Curve (magazine), a guest appearance on LOGO network's reality series Curl Girls, a web series segment on AfterEllen, a performance for the LGBT community hosted by Jane Lynch, and performances in Margaret Cho's Sensuous Woman Show. In 2008 The Pin Up Girls first recorded single "There She Goes...She's Real Fly" was picked up to be played on Showtime's hit lesbian series The L Word. In 2009 The Pin Up Girls music video, "There She Goes...She's Real Fly" premiered on Logo (TV channel) (an MTV network), on New Now Next Pop Lab. The Pin Up Girls' "Girl Candy," filmed in N.Y. and L.A., was released in 2011. The Pin Up Girls' "Pretty Things", featuring actress Elaine Hendrix, was filmed in L.A. by Director Joe LaRue in 2012 and was released in June 2012.

== History ==
2005-current: Beginnings as a dance troupe

The Pin Up Girls' director, Romeo, began her dance career in New York at the age of three and became a sought after dance instructor by the age of seventeen. In 2006, upon moving to LA, The Pin Up Girls were originally developed to be a variety show which combined burlesque, ballet, hip hop and belly dance. At the time the group did cover songs of classics such as "Fever" and "Criminal." In 2007, when the group was asked to send in original music to Showtimes' hit series The LWord, group leader Julia Romeo recorded "There She Goes...She's Real Fly." The hip hop lyrics of "There She Goes She's Real Fly", were written by Romeo just after high school and the soulful hook was an impromptu first-draft recording. Co Director Top DeWilde and director Vixen Romeo came up with the song's musical hook together and the song first aired on season 5 episode 7 (later airing on Logo Network, MTV hive, VH1 and Spike). In its third year running fire tribal, hip hop, live zills & doumbek playing was added to the show. Also many other songs, some of which include Girl Candy, Boushie B*tch and Pretty Things were released. The Pin Up Girls have published three music videos.

== Discography ==
=== Singles ===
- "There She Goes...She's Real Fly" (2009)
- "Boushie B*tch" (2009)
- "Pin Me Up" (2010)
- "Girl Candy" (2011)
- "Pretty Things" (2012)

=== Other appearances ===
- The L Word Music in Season 5 Episode 7 (2008)
- AfterEllen.com (2008)
- New Now Next Pop Lab (2009)
- MtvMusic (2009)
