= Emily Deschanel =

American actress (born 1976)

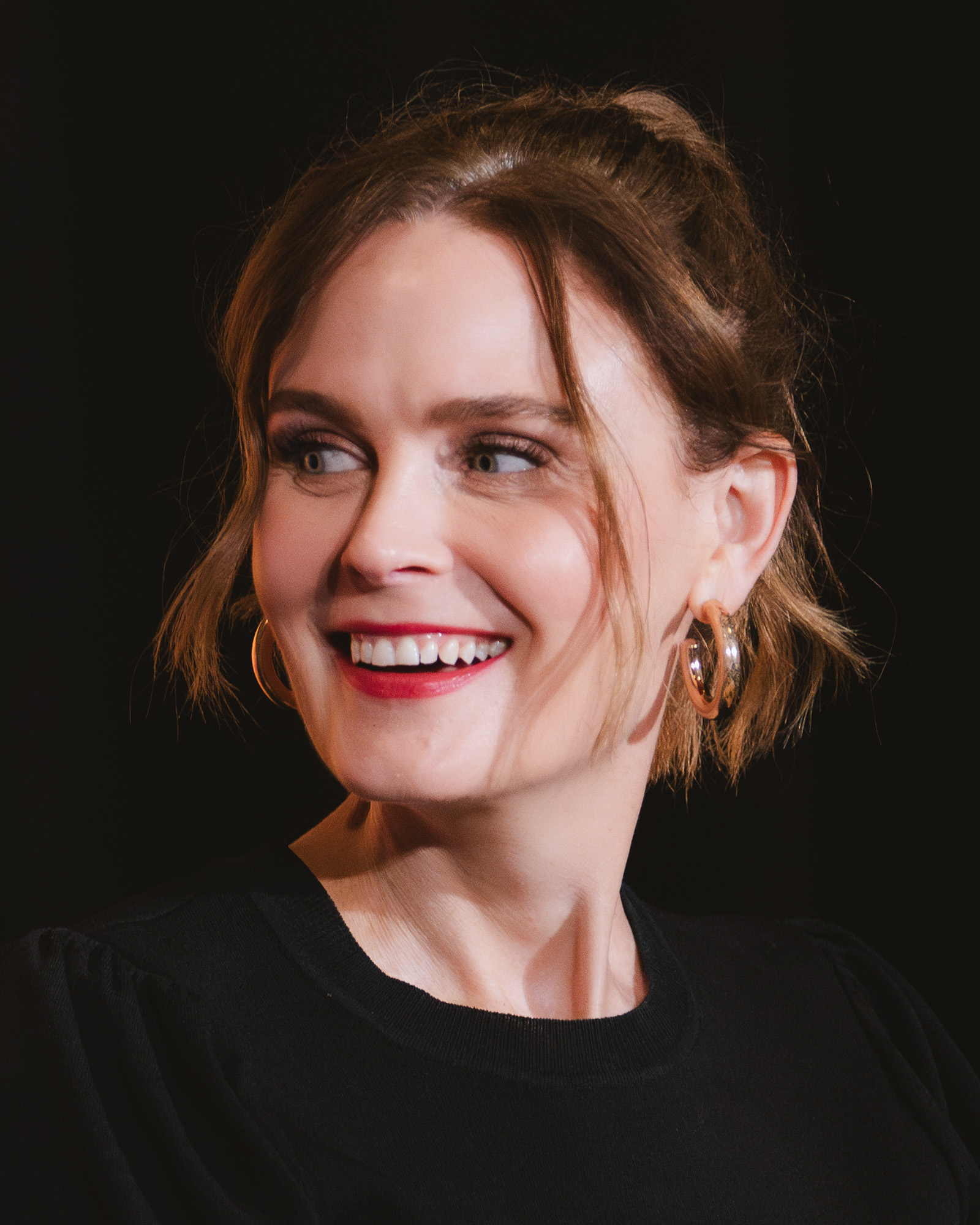
- Deschanel in 2025
- Born: Emily Erin Deschanel; October 11, 1976 (age 50); Los Angeles, California, U.S.
- Education: Boston University (BFA)
- Occupation: Actress
- Years active: 1993–present
- Spouse: David Hornsby (m. 2010)
- Children: 2
- Parents: Mary Jo Deschanel; Caleb Deschanel
- Relatives: Zooey Deschanel (sister)

Emily Erin Deschanel (/ˌdeɪʃəˈnɛl/; born October 11, 1976) is an American actress. She played Dr. Temperance "Bones" Brennan in the Fox crime procedural series Bones (2005–2017).

== Early life and education ==
Emily Erin Deschanel was born in Los Angeles, California, to cinematographer and director Caleb Deschanel and actress Mary Jo Deschanel (née Weir). Her younger sister is actress and singer-songwriter Zooey Deschanel. Her paternal grandfather was French, from Oullins, Rhône; her roots also include Swiss, Dutch, English, Irish, and other French ancestry.

Deschanel attended six different elementary schools in various places including Los Angeles, San Francisco, the Seychelles and London. In elementary school, Deschanel was diagnosed with ADHD and dyslexia. Deschanel attended Harvard-Westlake School and Crossroads School in Los Angeles. In 1998, she graduated from the Boston University College of Fine Arts.

== Career ==
In 1994, Deschanel made her feature film debut in the romantic comedy-drama It Could Happen to You, on which her father worked as chief cinematographer. Her next notable role was as Pam Asbury in Stephen King's horror miniseries Rose Red in 2002. Then she appeared in Cold Mountain, The Alamo, and Glory Road and was named one of "six actresses to watch" by Interview Magazine in 2004. Also in 2004, she had a supporting role as a receptionist in Sam Raimi's Spider-Man 2, starring Tobey Maguire in the titular role; the film was a massive critical and commercial success.

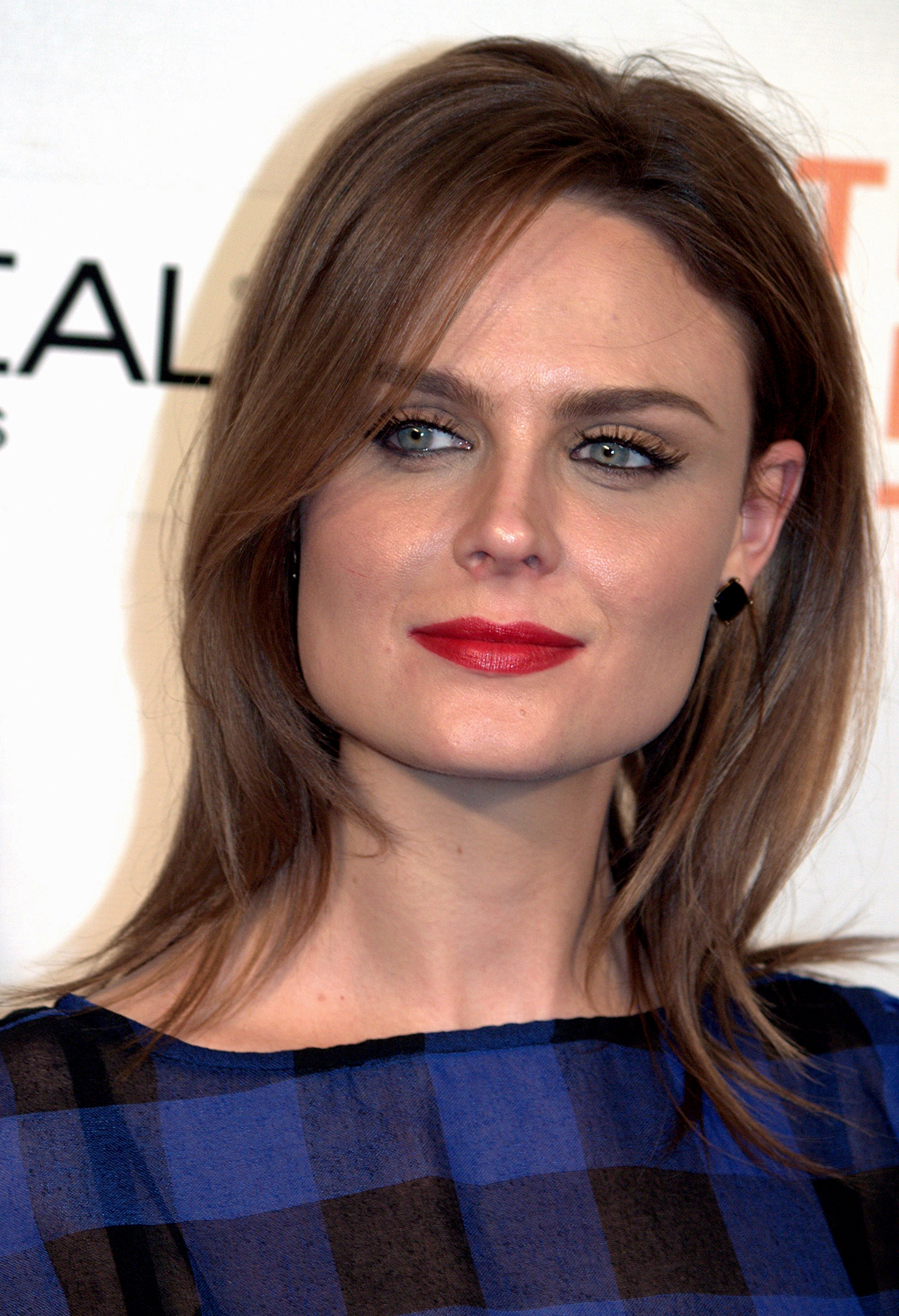
Deschanel in 2009

In 2005, Deschanel was cast as Dr. Temperance Brennan on the Fox crime procedural comedy-drama Bones, based on the novels and the career of forensic anthropologist and author Kathy Reichs, created by Hart Hanson. The series ran for 12 seasons from September 13, 2005, to March 28, 2017. For her performance, she received a 2006 Satellite Award nomination and a 2007 Teen Choice Award nomination. Deschanel and co-star David Boreanaz served as co-producers at the start of the show's third season, before becoming producers in the middle of the show's fourth season. While Bones was still in production, Deschanel also played the Brennan character on a 2015 episode of Sleepy Hollow and a 2016 episode of BoJack Horseman.

Deschanel, with Alyson Hannigan, Jaime King, Minka Kelly, and Katharine McPhee made a video slumber party featured on FunnyorDie.com to promote regular breast cancer screenings for the organization Stand Up 2 Cancer. In recent years, her passion for animal welfare has led her to providing the narration for My Child Is a Monkey and serving as an associate producer on the documentary film How I Became an Elephant. Deschanel ranked number 72 in The 2012 Hot 100 on AfterEllen.

Deschanel starred in the 2022 Netflix miniseries Devil in Ohio.

== Activism ==
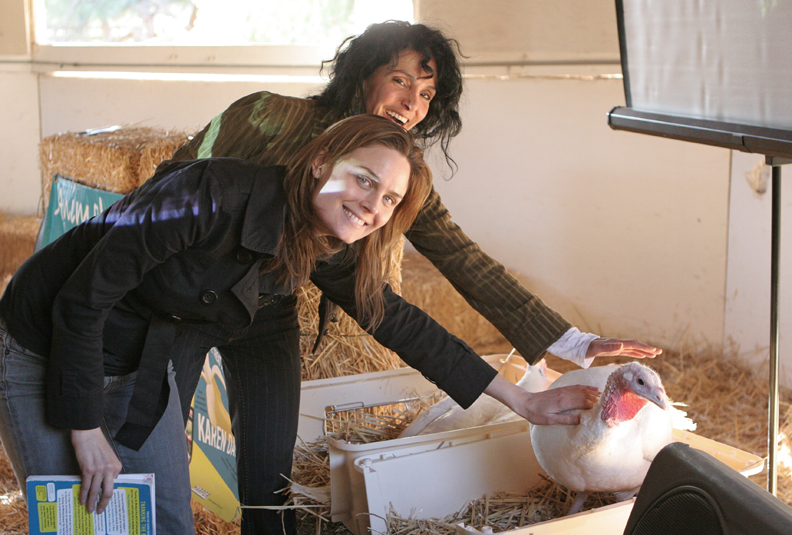
Deschanel with Karen Dawn in 2008

Deschanel is a vegan and a supporter of animal rights causes. She has said she went vegan after watching the film Diet for a New America. She can be seen in an Access Hollywood video at the book launch event of Karen Dawn's Thanking the Monkey: Rethinking the Way We Treat Animals, discussing her belief that vegetarian and vegan diets help the environment, and a video on the homepage of the book's website talking about the importance of animal rights. She collaborated with PETA on a video encouraging mothers to raise their children as vegans. In September 2014, she joined the board of directors at Farm Sanctuary.

== Personal life ==
Deschanel was raised Roman Catholic but is no longer practicing and has expressed agnostic views, saying "I am more of a spiritual person, if anything, and I am of the belief that we don't know, and I'm not going to pretend that I do."

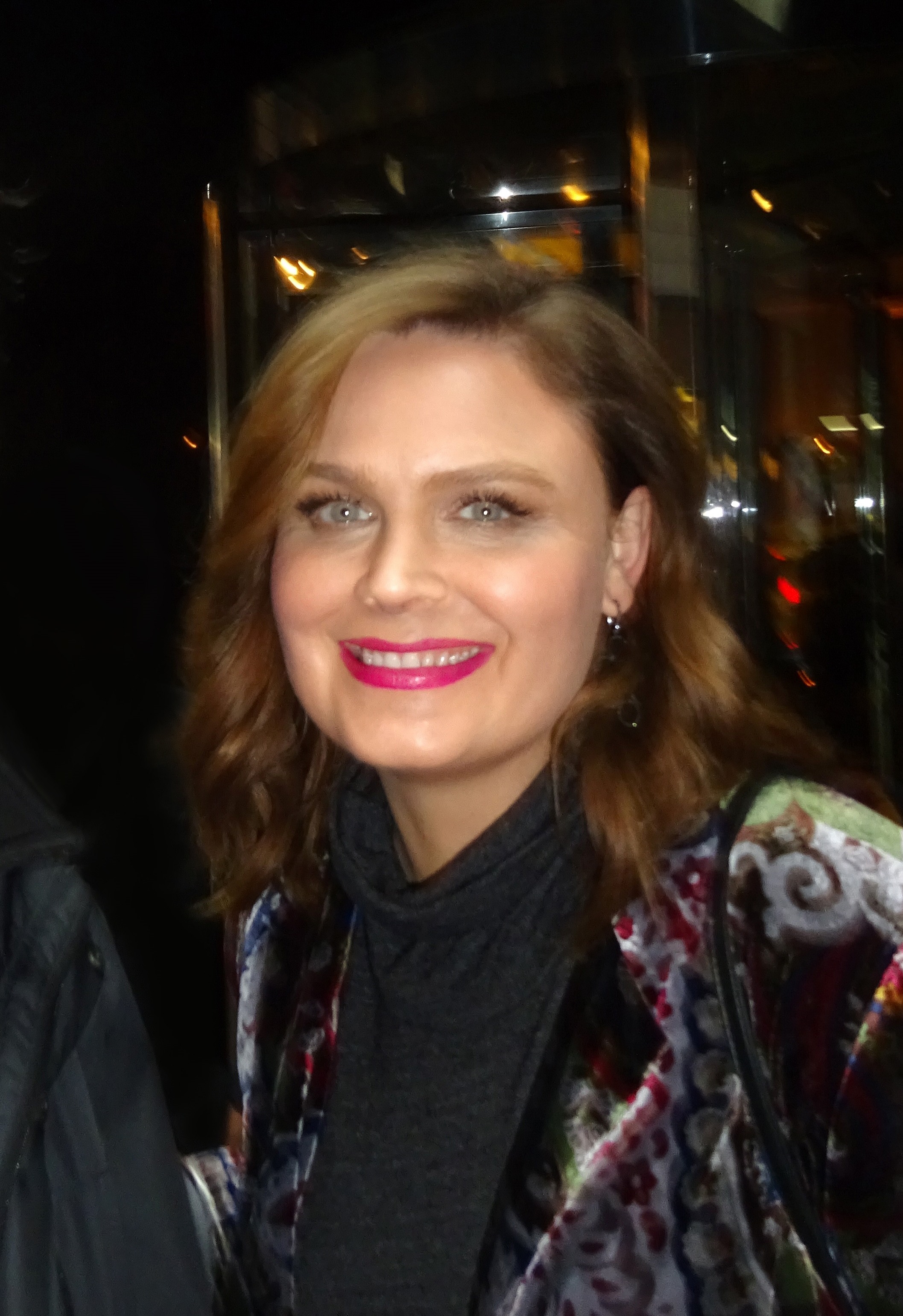
Deschanel in 2017

On September 25, 2010, Deschanel married It's Always Sunny in Philadelphia actor and writer David Hornsby in a small private ceremony in the Pacific Palisades area of Los Angeles. On September 21, 2011, Deschanel gave birth to their first son. On June 8, 2015, she gave birth to their second son.

In 2015, Deschanel, alongside Boreanaz, Reichs and Bones executive producer Barry Josephson, filed suit against Fox claiming they were cheated out of their share of series profits. In February 2019, an arbitrator awarded them $179 million: $128 million in punitive damages, $32 million in compensatory damages, $10 million in prejudgment interest and more than $9 million in fees and costs. In May 2019, the Los Angeles Superior Court voided the punitive damages, with the plaintiffs' attorneys saying they would appeal. In September 2019, the parties came to an undisclosed settlement.

In January 2025, her childhood home was destroyed in Pacific Palisades due to the events of the January 2025 Southern California wildfires and the Palisades Fire.

== Filmography ==
=== Film ===
Year	Title	Role	Notes
1994	It Could Happen to You	Animal rights activist	
2000	It's a Shame About Ray	Maggie	Short film
2003	Easy	Laura Harris	
2003	Cold Mountain	Mrs. Morgan	
2004	The Alamo	Rosanna Travis	
2004	Spider-Man 2	Receptionist	Cameo
2004	Old Tricks	Woman	Short film
2005	Boogeyman	Kate Houghton	
2005	Mute	Claire	Short film
2005	That Night	Annie	Short film
2006	Glory Road	Mary Haskins	
2007	The Diagnosis	Maggie	Short film
2009	My Sister's Keeper	Dr. Farquad	
2011	The Perfect Family	Shannon Cleary	
2015	Unity	Narrator	Documentary
2022	Continue	Janet	
2023	Big Boys	Nicole	
2024	ReEntry	Elinore 'Ellie' Bello	

=== Television ===
Year	Title	Role	Notes
2001	The Heart Department	Maude Allyn	Television movie
2002	Rose Red	Pam Asbury	3 episodes; Miniseries
2002	Law & Order: Special Victims Unit	Cassie Germaine	Episode: "Surveillance"
2002	Providence	Annie Franks	2 episodes
2003	The Dan Show	Sam	Television movie
2004	Crossing Jordan	Michelle	Episode: "All the News Fit to Print"
2005–2017	Bones	Temperance Brennan	Main role; also producer; Director: "The Hope in the Horror"
2009	Tit for Tat	Emily	Episode: "The Booby Scare"
2010–2011	The Cleveland Show	Julia Roberts (voice)	Episode: "Cleveland Live!"
2010–2011	The Cleveland Show	Herself (voice)	Episode: "Hot Cocoa Bang Bang"
2012	American Dad!	Temperance Brennan (voice)	Episode: "Less Money, Mo' Problems"
2014; 2019	Drunk History	Babe Didrikson Zaharias / Marina Raskova	2 episodes
2015	Sleepy Hollow	Temperance Brennan	Episode: "Dead Men Tell No Tales"
2016	BoJack Horseman	Herself (voice)	Episode: "Love And/Or Marriage"
2018	The Simpsons	Herself (voice)	Episode: "Bart's Not Dead"
2019	Animal Kingdom	Angela	Recurring role (Season 4)
2019	Superstore	Herself (voice)	Episode: "Employee App"
2021	The Rookie	Sarah Nolan	Episode: "Brave Heart"
2022	Devil in Ohio	Dr. Suzanne Mathis	8 episodes; Miniseries

== Awards and nominations ==
In May 2025, Deschanel delivered the commencement speech for her alma mater, Boston University, and received an honorary Doctor of Fine Arts.

Year	Award	Category	Nominated work	Result
2006	Satellite Awards	Best Actress – Television Series Drama	Bones	Nominated
2007	Teen Choice Awards	Choice TV Actress: Drama	Bones	Nominated
2011	People's Choice Awards	Favorite TV Crime Fighter	Bones	Nominated
2012	People's Choice Awards	Favorite TV Drama Actress	Bones	Nominated
2013	People's Choice Awards	Favorite Dramatic TV Actress	Bones	Nominated
2015	People's Choice Awards	Favorite TV Duo: David Boreanaz & Emily Deschanel	Bones	Nominated
2015	People's Choice Awards	Favorite Crime Drama TV Actress	Bones	Nominated
2016	People's Choice Awards	Favorite Crime Drama TV Actress	Bones	Nominated
