= Von Iva =

American electro soul-punk group

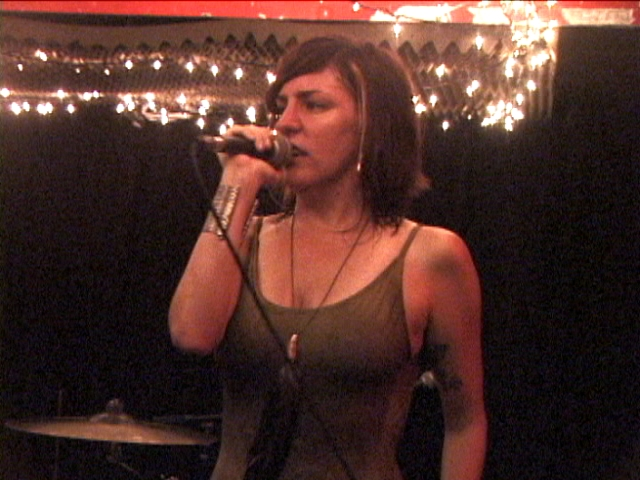
Jillian Iva

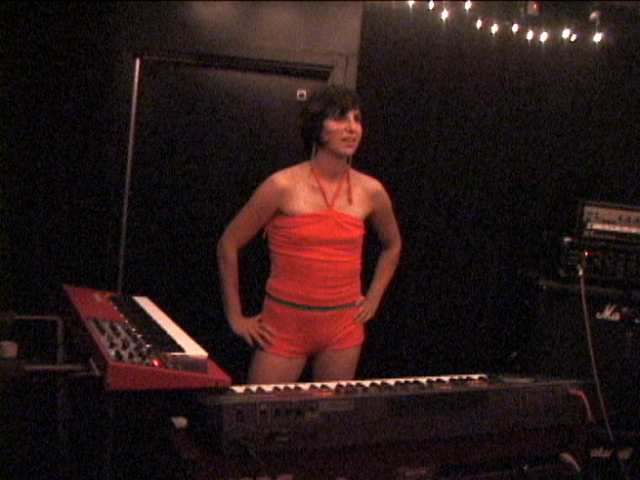
Bex

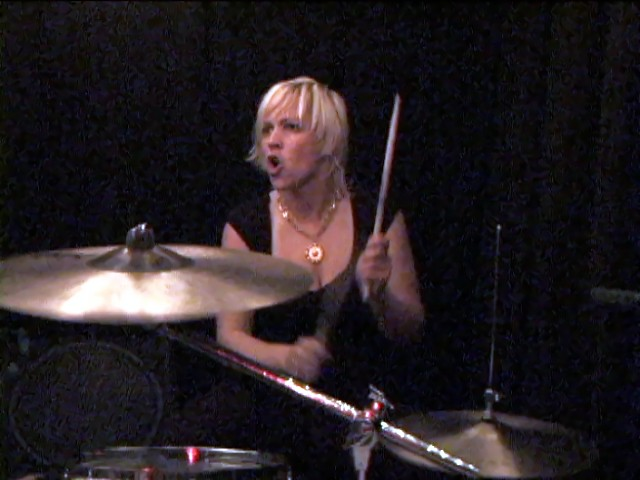
Lay Lay

Von Iva was an all-girl electro soul-punk group out of San Francisco.

== Members ==
- Jillian Iva Meador - vocals
- Bex (Rebecca Kupersmith) - keyboards
- Lay Lay (Kelly Harris) - drums

=== Former members ===
- Elizabeth Davis-Simpson - bass (ex-7 Year Bitch)

== Media appearance ==
Their song "Electricity" was used in Milestone srl game, SBK-09: Superbike World Championship (2009).

Their song "Feel it!" was used in Milestone srl game, Evolution GT (2006).

The band performs in the 6th and final episode of the surfing lesbian reality series Curl Girls.

The band appeared in the film Yes Man as Munchausen by Proxy, the band backing the character played by actress Zooey Deschanel; they recorded four songs for the film's soundtrack. The songs were "Uh-Huh", "Yes Man", "Sweet Ballad", and "Keystar". The band got the part of the fictional ensemble in the film after the movie's music supervisor, Jonathan Karp, saw the cover of their CD in Amoeba Music in Hollywood.

== Discography ==
=== EPs ===
- Von Iva - enhanced EP Cochon Records (2004)
- Our Own Island - enhanced LP Ruby Tower Records (2007)
- Girls on Film - enhanced EP Von Iva Music (2008)

=== Compilations ===
- "Not Hot To Trot" (+ Invisibles Remix) (The Rebel Sounds of) Frisco Disco #1: Vanishing / Von Iva split EP PrinceHouse Records (2004)
- "Soulshaker" on Greetings from Norcal - The Northern California Compilation Agent Records (2006)
- "Same Sad Song" on Nostalgia Del Buio Cochon Records (2007)

== Tours ==
The band was part of the "Hell on Heels Tour" and appeared live at the Knitting Factory in Hollywood, California March 11, 2009.

== Post-Von Iva ==
The band has since broken up, as the relationship between the three became more tense.
