= Zooey Deschanel =

American actress and singer (born 1980)

- Deschanel in 2026
- Born: Zooey Claire Deschanel; January 17, 1980 (age 46); Los Angeles, California, U.S.
- Occupations: Actress; singer
- Years active: 1997–present
- Works: Full list
- Spouses: Ben Gibbard (m. 2009; div. 2012) Jacob Pechenik (m. 2015; div. 2020)
- Partner(s): Jonathan Scott (2019–present; engaged)
- Children: 2
- Parents: Mary Jo Deschanel; Caleb Deschanel
- Relatives: Emily Deschanel (sister)
- Musical career
- Genres: Indie pop; folk; jazz
- Instruments: Vocals; piano; ukulele
- Labels: Merge; Double Six; Columbia; Fantasy
- Member of: She & Him

Zooey Claire Deschanel (/ˈzoʊi ˌdeɪʃəˈnɛl/ ZOH-ee day-shə-NEL; born January 17, 1980) is an American actress and singer. She made her film debut in Mumford (1999) and had a supporting role in Cameron Crowe's film Almost Famous (2000). Deschanel is known for her deadpan roles in comedy films such as The Good Girl (2002), The New Guy (2002), Elf (2003), The Hitchhiker's Guide to the Galaxy (2005), Failure to Launch (2006), Yes Man (2008), 500 Days of Summer (2009), and Our Idiot Brother (2011). She has also ventured into dramatic film territory with Manic (2001), All the Real Girls (2003), Winter Passing (2005), Bridge to Terabithia (2007), The Happening (2008), and The Driftless Area (2015). From 2011 to 2018, she starred as Jessica Day on the Fox sitcom New Girl, for which she received nominations for a Primetime Emmy Award and three Golden Globe Awards.

For a few years starting in 2001, Deschanel performed in the jazz cabaret act If All the Stars Were Pretty Babies with actress Samantha Shelton. In 2006, Deschanel teamed up with M. Ward to form She & Him, and subsequently released their debut album, Volume One, in 2008. They have since released six albums: Volume Two (2010), A Very She & Him Christmas (2011), Volume 3 (2013), Classics (2014), Christmas Party (2016), and Melt Away: A Tribute to Brian Wilson (2022). She received a Grammy Award nomination for Best Song Written for Visual Media for "So Long," which was featured on the soundtrack of the 2011 film Winnie the Pooh. Besides singing, she plays keyboards, percussion, banjo, and ukulele.

Deschanel was also a co-founder of the female-focused website HelloGiggles, which was acquired by Time Inc. in 2015.

== Early life ==
Zooey Claire Deschanel was born in Los Angeles, California, the younger daughter of cinematographer and director Caleb Deschanel and actress Mary Jo Deschanel (née Weir). Her paternal grandfather was French, from Oullins, Rhône, and her paternal grandmother came from a Quaker family; she also has Swiss, Dutch, English, Irish, and other French ancestry. She was named after Zooey Glass, the protagonist of J. D. Salinger's 1961 novella Franny and Zooey. Her older sister is actress Emily Deschanel, who starred in the Fox crime comedy-drama series Bones.

Deschanel lived in Los Angeles, but spent much of her childhood traveling because her father shot films on location. She hated the traveling, which involved leaving her friends and interacting with unfamiliar cultures. However, Deschanel later mentioned being happy for the experience.

She attended Crossroads, a private preparatory school in Santa Monica, and befriended future co-stars Jake Gyllenhaal and Kate Hudson there. Deschanel sang throughout high school, planning to pursue a career in musical theatre and attending French Woods Festival of the Performing Arts. She attended Northwestern University for nine months before dropping out to pursue acting.

== Acting career ==
=== 1997–2002: Early acting credits ===
Deschanel had a guest appearance on the television series Veronica's Closet in 1998. She made her film debut in Lawrence Kasdan's comedy Mumford (1999), revolving around the neurotic residents in a small town and co-starring Hope Davis, Jason Lee, Alfre Woodard and Mary McDonnell.

That same year, she appeared in a non-singing role in the music video for The Offspring's single "She's Got Issues", which premiered on September 27, 1999. Deschanel was a judge for the ninth Independent Music Awards. In 2005, she modeled for Chanel and Clements Ribeiro, and in 2010, she signed to represent Rimmel.

Deschanel co-starred in Cameron Crowe's semi-autobiographical Almost Famous (2000), where she played Anita Miller, the rebellious older sister of a teenage journalist. Despite a modest box office response, the film received critical praise, winning the Golden Globe Award for Best Film – Musical or Comedy. Deschanel appeared in the independent drama Manic (2001), as the love interest of a troubled teen (Joseph Gordon-Levitt). The film was screened at the Sundance Film Festival and received a limited theatrical release. The New York Times found Deschanel to be "particularly spontaneous, unaffected and emotionally direct" in her role.

Following early notice, Deschanel took on supporting parts in four feature films released throughout 2002: Big Trouble, The New Guy, The Good Girl, and Abandon. In the comedy Big Trouble, with Tim Allen and Rene Russo, she played the daughter of a devoted and reluctant woman, and in the teen comedy The New Guy, starred as a guitar player in a band. Deschanel portrayed a cynical, plain-spoken young woman working in a big-box store in the black dramedy The Good Girl, opposite Jennifer Aniston and Jake Gyllenhaal. The psychological thriller Abandon saw her play the roommate of a woman involved in her boyfriend's disappearance. Deschanel also made a one-episode appearance in Frasier, as Roz's out-of-control cousin, Jen. The New York Times reported that Deschanel was "one of Hollywood's most sought-after young stars" in 2002, and the Los Angeles Times wrote in early 2003 that Deschanel had become a recognizable type, due to "her deadpan, sardonic and scene-stealing [film] performances" as the protagonist's best friend. Deschanel objected to her typecasting, arguing, "A lot of these roles are just a formula idea of somebody's best friend, and it's like, I don't even have that many friends. In high school, I stayed home all the time, so I don't know how I'm everybody's best friend now."

=== 2003–2010: Breakthrough ===
Deschanel obtained her first leading film role in the independent drama All the Real Girls (2003) as Noel, a sexually curious 18-year-old virgin who has a life-changing romance with an aimless 22-year-old. The film premiered at the Sundance Film Festival and was an arthouse success. Her performance received wide critical acclaim, and Variety remarked: "Performances are all credible and naturalistic, but standing out from the rest is Deschanel's work, which evinces an impressively direct connection to her character's emotions. The actress does a wonderful job presenting a young woman who is trying, with varying degrees of success, to give voice to all sorts of things she has never felt or expressed before". She received an Independent Spirit Award nomination for Best Actress. Also in 2003, Deschanel starred opposite Will Ferrell in the Christmas comedy Elf as a deadpan department store worker and the love interest of a man raised by Santa's elves. Reviewers found the film to be a "spirited, good-natured family comedy" as part of an overall positive critical response. Elf earned US$220.4 million worldwide against a budget of US$33 million.

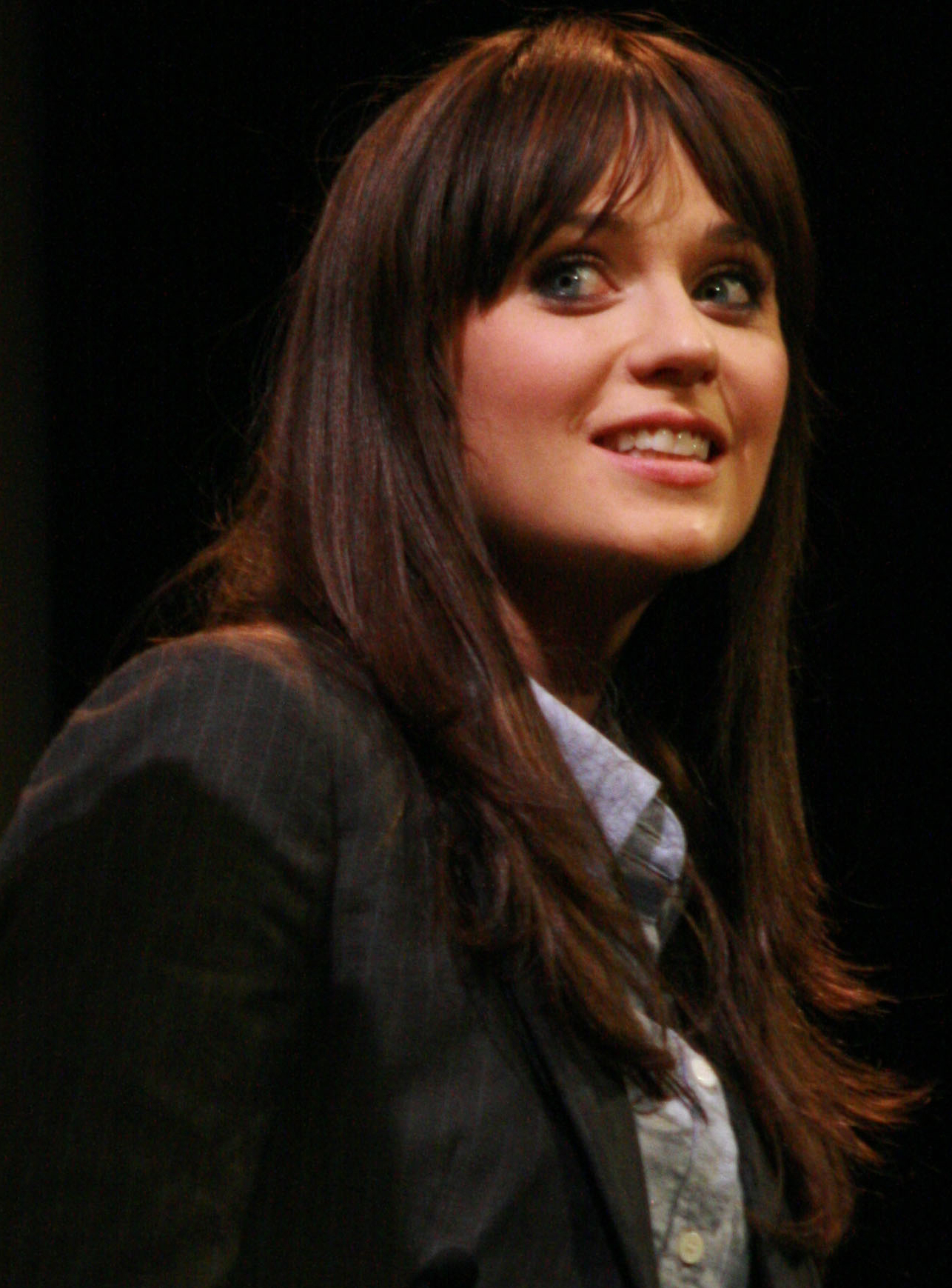
Deschanel at the premiere of 500 Days of Summer (2009)

In 2004, Deschanel starred in Eulogy, and in 2005 she played Trillian in the film adaptation of Douglas Adams's science fiction novel The Hitchhiker's Guide to the Galaxy. She acted in Winter Passing (2005), co-starring Will Ferrell. Deschanel next appeared in Failure to Launch (2006), as the neurotic roommate of Sarah Jessica Parker's character. She also had a recurring role in four episodes of the Showtime television series Weeds from 2006 to 2007 where she played Kat, Andy Botwin's ex-girlfriend. In September 2006, it was announced that Deschanel had signed on to play 1960s singer Janis Joplin in the film The Gospel According to Janis, to be co-written and directed by Penelope Spheeris. The film was scheduled to begin shooting in 2006, but was then postponed indefinitely; it was then resurrected again, with a planned release date of 2012, before being cancelled altogether in 2011. Deschanel expressed frustration with the cancellation, saying she had spent three years working on imitating Joplin's scratchy singing voice.

In 2007, Deschanel played Ms. Edmunds in Bridge to Terabithia, and the voice of a penguin in the animated film Surf's Up. She had a small role as Dorothy Evans in the revisionist Western The Assassination of Jesse James by the Coward Robert Ford and starred in the B comedy Flakes, which was released in only one theater. Deschanel starred as DG in the Syfy miniseries Tin Man, a re-imagined science fiction version of The Wonderful Wizard of Oz. It aired in December 2007. Deschanel also narrated the children's book Players in Pigtails. She voiced characters including Mary, Cletus's daughter, in four episodes of The Simpsons since debuting in the April 27, 2008 (Season 19) episode, "Apocalypse Cow", returning in seasons 24 (twice) and 36.

In M. Night Shyamalan's thriller The Happening (2008), she starred opposite Mark Wahlberg as a couple trying to escape from an inexplicable natural disaster. Despite largely negative reviews, critic Roger Ebert felt that Wahlberg and Deschanel's performances "bring a quiet dignity to their characters", and globally, the film made US$163 million. She starred in the independent comedy Gigantic (2008), which screened at the Toronto International Film Festival and was distributed for a limited release in certain parts of the United States only. In the comedy Yes Man (also 2008), she played an unorthodox singer and the girlfriend of Jim Carrey's character. The film grossed US$223.1 million around the world.

Deschanel reunited with Joseph Gordon-Levitt in the independent romantic drama about the development and demise of a relationship (500) Days of Summer (2009). The film garnered critical acclaim and became a "sleeper hit", earning over $60 million in worldwide returns, far exceeding its $7.5 million budget. Mark Adams of the Daily Mirror found the film to be a "modern romance for grown-ups" and a "sweet-natured, funny, deeply-romantic tale" blessed with "top-notch performances by Deschanel and Gordon-Levitt, who are both charming and have real chemistry". In December 2009, Deschanel guest-starred in a Christmas episode of the Fox crime procedural comedy-drama Bones, which was the first-ever on-screen pairing of the Deschanel sisters.

=== Since 2010: New Girl and other projects ===
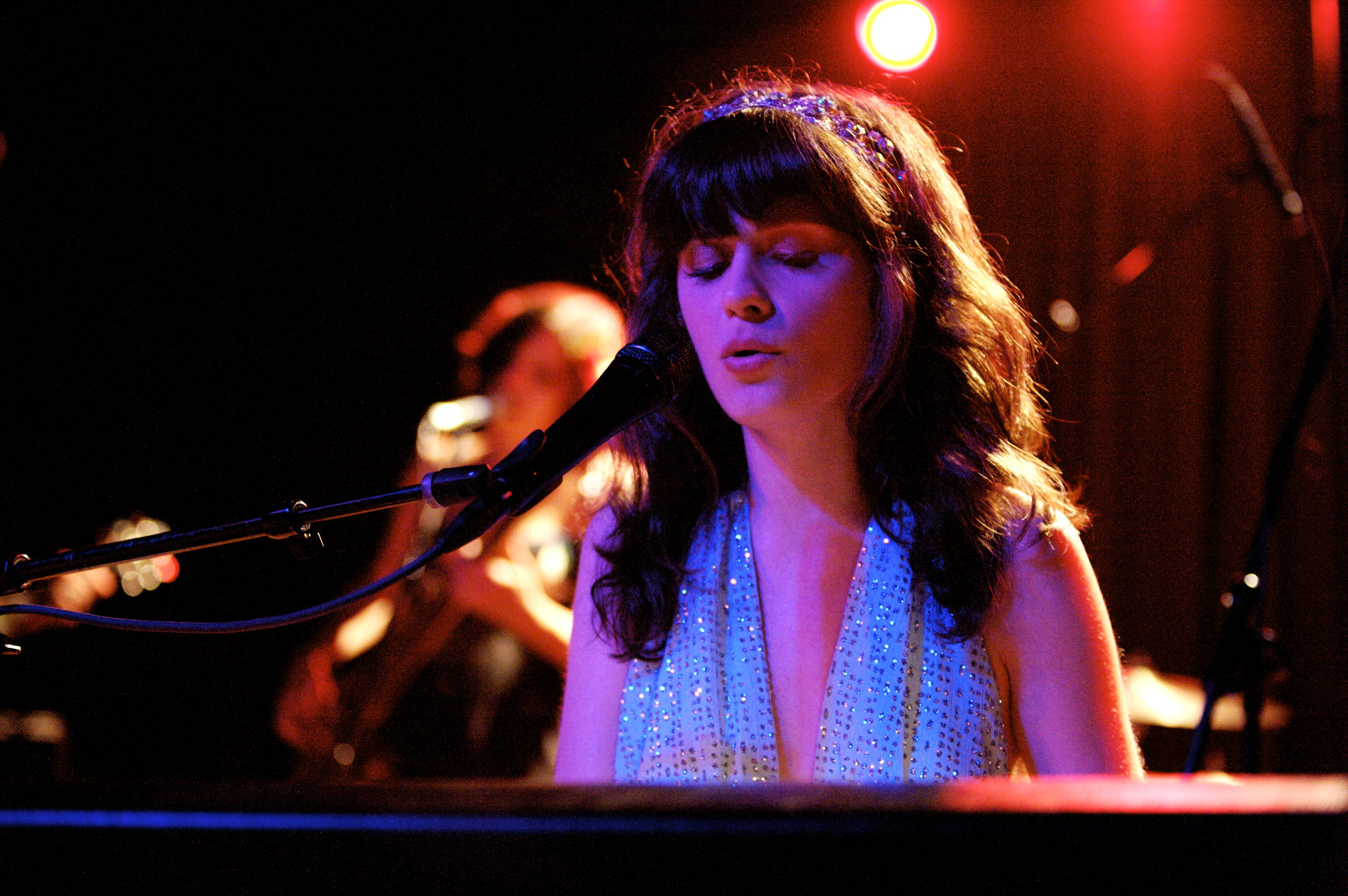
Deschanel in 2010

Deschanel was originally the top choice for Janet van Dyne / The Wasp in an early draft of Joss Whedon's The Avengers in which she would have played a prominent role. However, once Scarlett Johansson was cast as Natasha Romanoff / Black Widow, Deschanel was no longer in consideration to portray The Wasp with Janet's daughter Hope van Dyne taking up the mantle in the Infinity Saga, played by Evangeline Lilly. Deschanel starred in the comedy Our Idiot Brother (2011) as the independent and bisexual sister of a dimwitted but idealistic man (Paul Rudd). The production was screened at the Sundance Film Festival, to a generally positive critical reception. She played Princess Belladonna in the stoner fantasy-comedy Your Highness (2011), with Danny McBride and James Franco. The film received negative reviews and bombed at the box office. Describing her role, Roger Ebert noted in its review for the film: "[Deschanel is] brought onstage, quickly kidnapped by an evil sorcerer, spends a good deal of time as a captive in his lair, is rescued and lives happily ever after. She might as well be a mannequin, for all she's given to say and do. This intelligent, nuanced actress, standing there baffled. Used as a placeholder".

Deschanel signed on to star as a bubbly and offbeat teacher Jessica "Jess" Day on the Fox sitcom New Girl, created by Elizabeth Meriwether. She became a producer on the show and helped build the character, which she has described as a part of her, especially in regards to "the sort of enthusiasm and optimism" of her youth. The series premiered in September 2011, and USA Today described her performance as "a role tailored to launch her from respected indie actor to certified [television] star, Deschanel soars, combining well-honed skills with a natural charm". She has received an Emmy Award nomination and three Golden Globe nominations for her role. The series finale ran on May 15, 2018.

Deschanel hosted Saturday Night Live on February 11, 2012. That same year, she was featured in a commercial for the iPhone 4S (Siri).

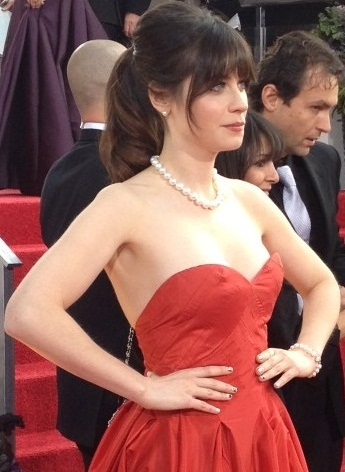
Deschanel at the 2013 Golden Globe Awards

In Rock the Kasbah (2015), she played a Los Angeles singer taken to Afghanistan by her former manager (Bill Murray). Despite a US$15 million budget, the comedy only made US$3 million at the North American box office. She obtained the role of a mysterious woman in the neo-noir drama The Driftless Area (2015), screened at the Tribeca Film Festival and released on video on demand and home media. She voiced a kind-hearted Bergen, Bridget, in the animated family comedy Trolls (2016), which grossed US$344 million worldwide. She reprised the role in its sequels Trolls World Tour (2020) and Trolls Band Together (2023).

In December 2020, Deschanel appeared in the music video for Katy Perry's song "Not the End of the World". In 2021, she co-hosted the ABC television series The Celebrity Dating Game with Michael Bolton.

In January 2022, she began co-hosting Welcome to Our Show, a New Girl rewatch podcast with co-stars Hannah Simone and Lamorne Morris, distributed by IHeartRadio. Deschanel appears as Kelly in season 3 of Physical released on August 2, 2023 and Nancy in Dreamin' Wild, released on August 4, 2023. She also appears as Terry in Harold and the Purple Crayon, which was released on August 2, 2024.

In March 2024, Deschanel was cast in the Amazon MGM romantic comedy film Merv (2025), directed by Jessica Swale. The film centres on an estranged couple who, after discovering that their shared dog is depressed following their breakup, decide to take the dog on a holiday to Florida in an attempt to lift its spirits.

== Music career ==
=== Singing and performing ===
In 2001, Deschanel formed If All the Stars Were Pretty Babies, a jazz cabaret act with fellow actress Samantha Shelton. The pair performed around Los Angeles.

In March 2007, Deschanel contributed vocals to two songs "Slowly" and "Ask Her to Dance" on the album Nighttiming by Jason Schwartzman's band Coconut Records. It was reported that Deschanel and M. Ward, who had previously performed with Deschanel on-stage, were recording music under the moniker She & Him. Their first album, titled Volume One, was released by Merge Records on March 18, 2008. It received a strong response from critics, with Paste magazine voting it the No. 1 Album of 2008. Patrick Caldwell of the Austin American Statesman wrote: "The album gently rambled through 13 tracks of sun-dappled pop, with a gentle Orbisonian charm and sweet, wistful vocals from Deschanel."

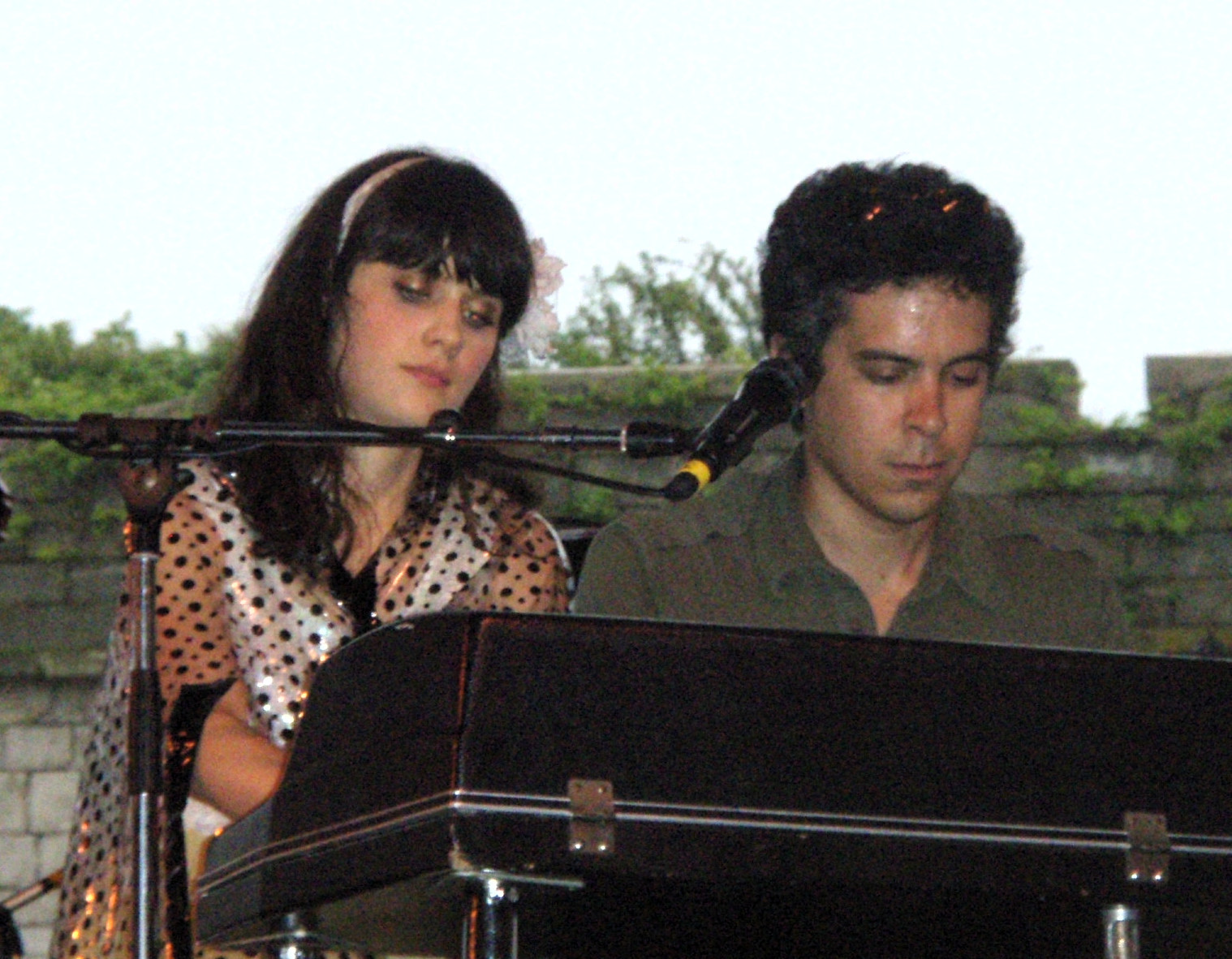
Deschanel and M. Ward performing as She & Him on a Wurlitzer electric piano at the Newport Folk Festival on August 2, 2008

Deschanel recorded "The Fabric of My Life" for a 2009 advertising campaign for Cotton Incorporated. On March 23, 2010, the second She & Him album, Volume Two, was released. Deschanel and M. Ward both featured on The Place We Ran From (2010), the album by Snow Patrol member Gary Lightbody's side project, Tired Pony. Deschanel contributed vocals to the tracks "Get on the Road" and "Point Me at Lost Islands", while M. Ward contributed vocals and guitar to the track "Held in the Arms of Your Words" and guitar to the track "That Silver Necklace".

Deschanel performed "God Bless America" during the seventh-inning stretch in game three of the National League Championship Series between the Philadelphia Phillies and San Francisco Giants on October 19, 2010, at AT&T Park in San Francisco. On October 23, 2011, Deschanel performed "The Star-Spangled Banner" before game four of the World Series between the Texas Rangers and the St. Louis Cardinals at Rangers Ballpark in Arlington, Texas. Deschanel contributed a cover of Buddy Holly's "It's So Easy" for the tribute album Listen to Me: Buddy Holly, released on September 6, 2011. She had previously appeared on Rave On Buddy Holly, with She & Him performing "Oh, Boy!", released in June 2011.

A Very She & Him Christmas was announced on Pitchfork.com in September 2011. The 12-track Christmas album was released October 25, 2011, under Merge Records. On December 28, 2011, she and Joseph Gordon-Levitt recorded an informal version of "What Are You Doing New Year's Eve?" for her HelloGiggles YouTube channel. It was immensely popular and within four days had over 6 million views. Deschanel was featured on bandmate M. Ward's sixth solo album, A Wasteland Companion (2012).

During a May 2012 performance at the Ryman Auditorium, country music singer Loretta Lynn announced that she was in the development stages of creating a Broadway musical from her autobiography and Deschanel would play the title role., saying, "There's a little girl back stage that's going to do the play of 'Coal Miner's Daughter' on Broadway". She then brought Deschanel onstage and the two sang a duet of the title song. On September 21, 2012, it was announced that Deschanel was producing the comedy Must Be Nice, written by New Girl consulting producer J. J. Philbin.

She and Him's next album, Volume 3 was released by Merge Records in May 2013. In the 15-track album, Deschanel wrote eleven songs, while three others are cover songs. It debuted at number 15 on the Billboard 200. The band's fifth studio album, Classics, received a December 2014 release by Columbia Records, and it features 13 covers of classic songs, recorded live and accompanied by a 20-piece orchestra. Response towards the album was positive, with Robert Hamm for Alternative Press writing that Deschanel "is a delight, at times coy and romantic, and in other moments, moody and pensive". She also appeared as a guest vocalist on Brian Wilson's album No Pier Pressure (2015). She & Him's second Christmas album and sixth album overall, Christmas Party, was released in 2016.

=== Film-related music ===
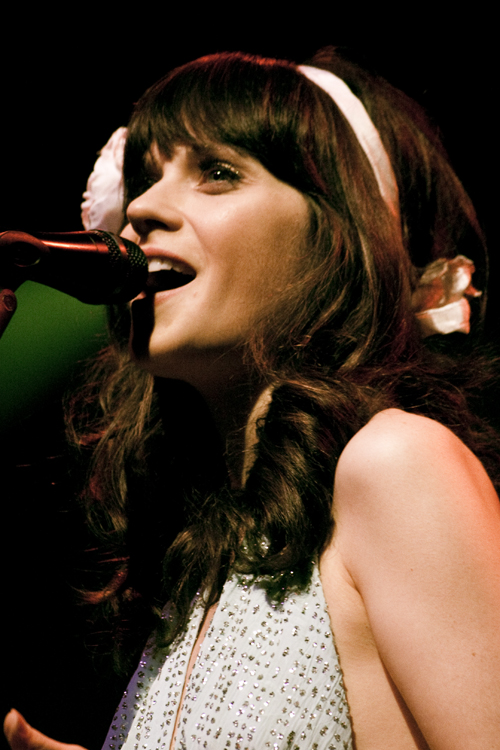
Deschanel performing in New York in 2008

Deschanel made her on-screen singing debut in The New Guy (2002). In Elf (2003), she sings "Baby, It's Cold Outside" with Will Ferrell in the bathroom shower scene and with Leon Redbone on the soundtrack, and "Auld Lang Syne" with James Caan on piano. Her piano composition "Bittersuite" was used thematically in the dark dramedy Winter Passing (2006), in which she co starred with Ferrell and Ed Harris, and also sings "My Bonnie Lies over the Ocean" in the film.

In 2007, other singing credits followed: the television musical Once Upon a Mattress ("An Opening for a Princess", "In a Little While", "Normandy", and "Yesterday I Loved You"); an old cabaret song in The Assassination of Jesse James by the Coward Robert Ford ("A Bird in a Gilded Cage"); and the short film Raving ("Hello, Dolly!"). Deschanel and a cast of school children sing the Steve Earle song "Someday" and War's "Why Can't We Be Friends?" in Bridge to Terabithia.

In Yes Man (2008), Deschanel sings several songs featured in the film and on the film soundtrack, and is shown singing "Uh-Huh" and "Sweet Ballad" with San Franciscan all-girl electro soul-punk group Von Iva in a fictional band called "Munchausen by Proxy". In 500 Days of Summer (2009), Deschanel sings a cover of The Smiths's "Please, Please, Please, Let Me Get What I Want" and it appears on the soundtrack of the film, as performed by She & Him. She also sings a cover of "Sugar Town" by Nancy Sinatra. Deschanel and Joseph Gordon-Levitt did a music video, called Bank Dance, directed by 500 Days of Summer director Marc Webb, to accompany the film. It uses the She & Him song "Why Do You Let Me Stay Here?", and some complicated choreography, choreographed by Michael Rooney. Mason Novick, the film's producer said, "We made the short because Zooey came in and said, 'I have this idea ... because I didn't get to dance in the movie'" (as Gordon-Levitt did).

Deschanel sings "The Greatest Most Beautiful Love Song in All the Land" with James Franco in the comedy Your Highness (2011). She also appears with M. Ward in a number of songs on the soundtrack album for Disney's animated version of Winnie the Pooh (2011), earning a Grammy Award for Best Song Written for Visual Media nomination for "So Long". Deschanel wrote and performed the theme song to New Girl. Also, in season three's episode "Prince", the song "Fallinlove2nite" is sung by Deschanel and Prince. In Rock the Kasbah (2015), she sang a cover of Meredith Brooks's "Bitch", which is featured in the soundtrack for the film. In 2016, Deschanel voiced Bridget, the scullery maid in the animated film Trolls.

== Other work ==
In May 2011, after the success of her HelloGiggles YouTube channel, Deschanel, along with producer Sophia Rossi and writer Molly McAleer, founded the website HelloGiggles.com, an entertainment website geared towards women. HelloGiggles.com was acquired by Time, Inc. in 2015.

In 2023, Deschanel hosted the Max informational show What Am I Eating?. It was based on a previous series Deschanel did for ATTN:, Your Food's Roots.

== Personal life ==
Deschanel is allergic to eggs, dairy products, and soy. She had a gluten allergy but stated in a 2022 interview on Armchair Expert that she no longer suffers from it. She used to be a vegan, which she gave up because she found it difficult to eat enough calories on a vegan diet due to her sensitivities to wheat and soy. A year prior to giving up her vegan diet, she was featured on episode eight of season one of Bravo's Top Chef Masters, in which the chefs participating in the competition were challenged to cater a vegan lunch party for her family and friends using no soy or gluten. As of 2023 Deschanel is a pescetarian.

In December 2008, Deschanel became engaged to musician Ben Gibbard, lead vocalist for Death Cab for Cutie and The Postal Service. They married on September 19, 2009, near Seattle, Washington. The couple announced their separation in November 2011, and Deschanel filed for divorce the next month due to "unhappy and irreconcilable differences". The divorce was finalized on December 12, 2012.

Deschanel confirmed her engagement to film producer Jacob Pechenik in January 2015, and they married on June 21, 2015. They have two children, a daughter and a son. The couple separated on January 8, 2019. Pechenik filed for divorce that October, which was finalized on June 1, 2020.

In August 2019, Deschanel met Property Brothers star Jonathan Scott while filming an episode of Carpool Karaoke: The Series. On August 13, 2023, Deschanel and Scott announced their engagement at Edinburgh Castle in Scotland.

In January 2025, Emily and Zooey Deschanel's childhood home in Pacific Palisades was destroyed by the January 2025 Southern California wildfires and the Palisades Fire.

== Awards and nominations ==
Year	Association	Category	Nominated work	Result
2003	Mar del Plata International Film Festival	Best Actress	All the Real Girls	Won
2004	Independent Spirit Awards	Best Female Lead	All the Real Girls	Nominated
2009	Satellite Awards	Best Actress in a Motion Picture Musical or Comedy	(500) Days of Summer	Nominated
2011	Satellite Awards	Best Actress – Television Series Musical or Comedy	New Girl	Nominated
2012	Golden Globe Awards	Best Actress – Television Series Musical or Comedy	New Girl	Nominated
2012	Grammy Awards	Best Song Written for Visual Media	Winnie the Pooh (song "So Long")	Nominated
2012	Annie Awards	Music in a Feature Production	Winnie the Pooh	Nominated
2012	Teen Choice Awards	Choice Fashion Icon	—N/a	Nominated
2012	Teen Choice Awards	Choice TV Actress Comedy	New Girl	Nominated
2012	Critics' Choice Television Awards	Best Actress in a Comedy Series	New Girl	Won (tied with Amy Poehler)
2012	The Comedy Awards	Comedy Actress	New Girl	Nominated
2012	Primetime Emmy Awards	Outstanding Lead Actress in a Comedy Series	New Girl	Nominated
2013	Critics' Choice Television Awards	Best Actress in a Comedy Series	New Girl	Nominated
2013	People's Choice Awards	People's Choice Award for Favorite TV Comedy Actress	New Girl	Nominated
2013	Golden Globe Awards	Best Actress – Television Series Musical or Comedy	New Girl	Nominated
2014	Golden Globe Awards	Best Actress – Television Series Musical or Comedy	New Girl	Nominated
2016	People's Choice Awards	Favorite Comedic TV Actress	New Girl	Nominated
2017	People's Choice Awards	Favorite Comedic TV Actress	New Girl	Nominated
2017	Annie Awards	Best Voice Acting	Trolls	Nominated
2024	Daytime Emmy Awards	Outstanding Culinary Series	What Am I Eating?	Nominated
