= Winter Passing =

- Promotional movie poster
- Directed by: Adam Rapp
- Written by: Adam Rapp
- Produced by: David Koplan; P. Jennifer Dana
- Starring: Ed Harris; Zooey Deschanel; Will Ferrell; Amelia Warner; Amy Madigan; Dallas Roberts
- Cinematography: Terry Stacey
- Edited by: Meg Reticker
- Music by: John Kimbrough; The Eagles; Azure Ray
- Distributed by: Yari Film Group
- Release dates: September 10, 2005 (TIFF); February 17, 2006 (U.S.)
- Running time: 98 minutes
- Country: United States
- Language: English
- Budget: $3.5 million

Winter Passing is a 2005 American comedy-drama film directed by playwright Adam Rapp and starring Ed Harris, Zooey Deschanel, Will Ferrell, Amelia Warner, Amy Madigan, and Dallas Roberts. Rapp's directorial debut, the film premiered at the 2005 Toronto International Film Festival to mixed reviews and received a limited theatrical release in February 2006. The film was not released in the United Kingdom until 2013, when it was released under the new title Happy Endings.

== Plot ==
Reese Holdin is a depressed bartender and actress living in New York City. She regularly engages in casual sex, cocaine use and self-harm. Reese, who happens to be the daughter of a famous author named Don Holdin, is approached by a publishing agent who offers her $100,000 for a series of old letters written between her reclusive father and her late mother. When Reese learns that the kitten she rescued from the streets is dying of feline leukemia, she drowns it and buys a bus ticket to Michigan's Upper Peninsula to retrieve the letters.

Returning to her childhood home, she finds it occupied by Corbit, a down-and-out Christian musician, and Shelly, a 23-year-old former student of Don's. Reese's father now lives, writes and drinks in his garage. Reese initially clashes with the doting Shelly (whom she accuses of sleeping with her father) but eventually accepts her after learning of the death of her parents and of Don's support of her during a near-fatal illness endometriosis. She also bonds with the idiosyncratic Corbit, who spurns her sexual advances and has trouble playing guitar and singing at the same time. She feels out of place at home and fights with her father over childhood neglect, stating that her parents gave their typewriters more attention. She eventually finds the box of letters and, reading the emotional communiques, learns to empathize with her estranged parents. Shelly has also read the letters and asks Reese if she intends to publish them. Reese expresses ambiguity over the matter.

Don is still grieving over his wife's death. He keeps the tie she hanged herself with in a dresser in the backyard along with the rest of their bedroom suite, including their bed. He sometimes sleeps in the bed despite the bitter cold of winter. Reese starts to connect with Corbit and Shelly and is honest with her father about her reasons for staying away from the funeral. Soon after, Don overdoses on sleeping pills and Reese finds him unconscious. He recovers in the hospital, where Reese sits by his bed and reads his latest manuscript, Golf, which he had Corbit bury in the yard. The experience helps the father and daughter find closure, and Reese buries the box of letters in place of the novel before returning to New York.

== Cast ==
- Zooey Deschanel as Reese Holdin
- Ed Harris as Don Holdin
- Will Ferrell as Corbit
- Amelia Warner as Shelly
- Mary Jo Deschanel as Mary
- Amy Madigan as Lori Lansky
- Michael Chernus as Ben
- Deirdre O'Connell as Deirdre
- Anthony Rapp as Dean
- Jim True-Frost as Dr. Staley
- Sam Bottoms as Brian
- Rachel Dratch as Female MC

== Production ==
According to playwright Adam Rapp, the film originated as an idea for a two-act play. Said Rapp, "I'm a big fan of J.D. Salinger, and I know someone who knows Salinger's son. Matt [Salinger] went to his father's house for Thanksgiving about six years ago. His father opened boxes of manuscripts he'd been working on for 50 years. He asked his son to burn them after he died. What bitterness. I thought, that'd be an interesting character. How do you relate to a character with a splintered mind who's started to slip into madness? What about the children of the artist? That was the germ of the idea."

Though the film is mostly set in Michigan, it was primarily filmed in New Jersey.

== Release ==
In May 2004, it was reported that Focus Features would handle the film's U.S. distribution as part of a deal with Stratus Film Company, with a aim for a fall 2004 theatrical release. However, the theatrical release was later delayed and as of a result, Focus later ended up giving the domestic rights back to Bob Yari.

The film later premiered at the 2005 Toronto International Film Festival in September 2005 and was later released theatrically in the United States on February 17, 2006 by Stratus' parent company Yari Film Group, which was the first self-distributed release under the Yari Film Group banner.

== Reception ==
Some film critics have voiced theories that one or more of the film's characters are based on famous writers or poets. New York Times film and music critic Stephen Holden suggested J.D. Salinger, Sylvia Plath, Jack Kerouac, Ken Kesey, Ted Hughes and Ernest Hemingway as possible inspirations for Reese's parents. Film critic Roger Ebert suggested Frederick Exley as the most likely basis for Don's character.

Ebert gave the film 3.5 out of 4 stars, lauding it for balancing sadness, loneliness, humor and affection. He stated: "This is the kind of movie routinely dismissed as too slow and quiet by those who don't know it is more exciting to listen than to hear." Robert Koehler of Variety gave a negative review but wrote positively of Will Ferrell, saying though his presence may not appear to fit with the film's serious themes, "he wisely eschews his familiar shtick for a register he hasn’t displayed before, playing a guy who’s set aside his dreams to take care of another person." Ty Burr of The Boston Globe wrote that the movie feels like "two indie movies trapped in one film", but commended Zooey Deschanel. Burr wrote, "Reese is not a particularly likable woman-child, and she can be brutal to people and things she no longer has use for (that includes herself), but Rapp has written into her a spark of tenderness that's on the verge of going out forever."
