= Yes Man (film) =

2008 romantic comedy film by Peyton Reed

- Theatrical release poster
- Directed by: Peyton Reed
- Screenplay by: Nicholas Stoller; Jarrad Paul; Andrew Mogel
- Based on: Yes Man by Danny Wallace
- Produced by: David Heyman; Richard D. Zanuck
- Starring: Jim Carrey; Zooey Deschanel; Bradley Cooper; John Michael Higgins; Terence Stamp
- Cinematography: Robert D. Yeoman
- Edited by: Craig Alpert
- Music by: Lyle Workman; Mark Oliver Everett
- Production companies: Warner Bros. Pictures; Village Roadshow Pictures; The Zanuck Company; Heyday Films
- Distributed by: Warner Bros. Pictures
- Release dates: December 9, 2008 (London); December 19, 2008 (United States); December 26, 2008 (United Kingdom)
- Running time: 104 minutes
- Countries: United States; United Kingdom
- Language: English
- Budget: $70 million
- Box office: $223.2 million

Yes Man is a 2008 romantic comedy film directed by Peyton Reed, written by Nicholas Stoller, Jarrad Paul and Christofer Tufton, and starring Jim Carrey. The film is based loosely on the 2005 memoir of the same name by the British humorist Danny Wallace, who also makes a cameo appearance in the film.

Production for the film began in Los Angeles in October 2007. It was released by Warner Bros. Pictures on December 19, 2008, in the United States and was then released in the United Kingdom on December 26, 2008. The film received mixed reviews, with most critics calling the plot too similar to one of Carrey's past films, Liar Liar, but was a box office success, making $223 million worldwide.

== Plot ==
Bank loan officer Carl Allen has become withdrawn since his divorce from his wife Stephanie. Having an increasingly negative outlook and ignoring his friends Peter and Rooney, he misses Peter and his fiancée Lucy's engagement party.

His old colleague Nick suggests that Carl attend a motivational seminar that encourages people to seize every opportunity to say "yes". At the seminar, Carl meets inspirational guru Terrence, who has him enter a "covenant with the universe" and say yes to everything asked of him.

As they leave the seminar, Carl says "yes" to a homeless man's request and becomes stranded, out of gas, and with no battery life on his cell phone in Elysian Park. Walking to a gas station, he meets Allison, an eccentric young woman. She gives him a hectic ride back to his car on her scooter and, when he asks her to make out with him, she kisses him before leaving. A few days later, he is offered oral sex by his elderly neighbour Tillie for helping her put up shelves; when he declines and immediately experiences bad luck, he returns and surprisingly enjoys the moment.

After having a pleasant workday, Carl is convinced that he must continue to say yes, as his previous misery was the consequence of refusing opportunities. He renews his friendships with Peter and Rooney; builds a bond with his nerdy boss, Norman; assists Lucy with her bridal shower; and learns to speak Korean, play the guitar, and fly airplanes.

Accepting a band flyer outside of a coffee shop, Carl sees an idiosyncratic band called Munchausen by Proxy; the lead singer is Allison. He is charmed by her quirkiness; she is delighted by his spontaneity, and they begin dating. They sneak into the Hollywood Bowl and sing "Can't Buy Me Love" by The Beatles, among getting up to other hijinks together. Carl earns a promotion at work after approving several microloans and, using his guitar lessons, plays Third Eye Blind's song "Jumper" to persuade a man not to commit suicide.

Carl and Allison meet at the airport for a spontaneous weekend excursion. Having decided to take the first plane out of town, regardless of its destination, they end up in Lincoln, Nebraska, where they bond more. Allison confesses her love for Carl and asks him to move in with her, and he hesitantly agrees.

While checking in for the return flight, Carl and Allison are detained by FBI agents who, due to Carl's recent erratic behaviour, have profiled him as a potential terrorist. Peter travels to Nebraska as Carl's attorney and explains the situation of Carl's responding to every request and opportunity with yes, simultaneously revealing the truth to Allison. Deciding she cannot trust him, she leaves Carl and refuses to return his phone calls.

Having almost forgotten about Lucy's shower, Carl quickly arranges a major surprise party, as well as setting up Norman and Rooney with Soo-Mi and Tillie, respectively. After the party, Carl receives a tearful phone call from Stephanie, whose new boyfriend has walked out on her. When he goes to comfort her, she kisses him, asking him to spend the night. After Carl says no, his luck takes a turn for the worse.

Deciding to end the covenant, Carl returns to the convention centre and hides in the backseat of Terrence's convertible so he can be released. However, he pops up while Terrence is driving, startling him and causing a collision. Once Carl regains consciousness in the hospital, Terrence tells him the covenant was merely a starting point to open Carl's mind to other possibilities, not to permanently take away his ability to say no.

Freed from this restraint, Carl finds Allison teaching her sports-photography class and admits that he is not ready to move in with her yet but genuinely loves her, and they reconcile.

Carl persuades the attendees of Terrence's next seminar to donate the clothes off their backs to charity, so Terrence is greeted by an entirely nude convention centre.

== Cast ==
- Jim Carrey as Carl Allen
- Zooey Deschanel as Allison
- Bradley Cooper as Peter, Carl's best friend
- John Michael Higgins as Nick
- Terence Stamp as Terrence
- Rhys Darby as Norman, Carl's boss
- Danny Masterson as Rooney, Carl's other best friend
- Fionnula Flanagan as Tillie, Carl's elderly neighbor
- Sasha Alexander as Lucy, Peter's fiancée
- Molly Sims as Stephanie, Carl's ex-wife
- Brent Briscoe as homeless guy
- Rocky Carroll as Wes
- John Cothran as Tweed
- Spencer Garrett as Multack
- Aaron Takahashi as Lee
- Sean O'Bryan as Ted
- Vivian Bang as Soo-Mi
- Jarrad Paul as Reggie
- Luis Guzmán as Jumper
- Maile Flanagan as Janet
- Anna Khaja as Faranoush
- Danny Wallace as conventioner (uncredited)

== Production ==
Yes Man is based on a memoir of the same name by humourist Danny Wallace. The book tells of the 6-month period in which he committed himself to saying 'Yes' to everything based on a brief conversation with a stranger he met on the bus. Wallace also has a cameo in the film, in the final bar scene of the movie, in which he is speaking to someone behind Danny Masterson.

Jim Carrey declined an upfront salary for his role in the film. He was instead paid 36.2% of the film's gross after its production and marketing costs were recovered.

During shooting of a scene where Carrey's character bungee jumps off a bridge, Carrey interrupted and asked to do the stunt himself. Carrey stated to the stunt double that he intended to do it in one take. When he jumps off, he is seen taking out a cell phone for the scene.

While shooting the scene in the bar where Carrey's character turns around into a waitress and falls flat on his back, Carrey executed the stunt incorrectly and fell to the floor harder than he expected, breaking three ribs in the process.

Carrey learned basic Korean for a scene. Language coach John Song was hired to teach Carrey for ten weeks; Song also played the character's Korean teacher in a brief cameo. Similarly extensive training was needed for the scenes in which Carrey's character learns to play the guitar; Carrey tried to play during the years of his childhood, but "quit before ever learning a chord". Carrey said in an interview with HBO: "Just learning the basic chords was maybe the most challenging part of any movie I've worked on in my career. Peyton [Reed] even joked about the guitar part being dubbed, or just cut altogether." Reed played the song "Jumper" by Third Eye Blind, which had a high number of digital downloads after the film's theatrical release. After the final date of filming, Carrey "retired" his set guitar, and Deschanel kept it. When asked about this, Carrey said: "I'll never need that, or any guitar ever again; guitar is not for me! Never has been, never will be!"

== Music ==
The film's soundtrack features original music by Munchausen by Proxy, a fictional band named after Münchausen syndrome by proxy (a psychological disorder). In the film, the band consists of actress Deschanel on lead vocals and the San Francisco-based all-female band Von Iva, a trio of vocals, keyboards and drums. Von Iva's members collaborated with Deschanel, a singer-songwriter and one half of the duo She & Him, on writing and recording the band's songs for the film. Von Iva got the part of the fictional ensemble in the film after the movie's music supervisor, Jonathan Karp, saw the cover of their CD in Amoeba in Hollywood. For the DVD/Blu-ray release of the film, Deschanel and Von Iva filmed a spoof MTV music show-style documentary on the band for which they filmed mock music videos for several of the songs; the home video release also includes full-length performances by the group that were not included in the film.

The soundtrack also features nine songs by Eels, including a brand-new song entitled "Man Up".

The introduction music at the beginning of the film from Carrey's ringtone comes from the song "Separate Ways" by Journey. It is also featured when Carrey's character bails out from the hospital to catch the joggography at 6 am. "Helicopter" by Bloc Party plays on the first joggography scene.

== Reception ==
=== Box office ===
The film opened No. 1 in its first weekend at the US box office with $18.3 million, and was top of the UK box office in its first weekend after release.

To date, the film has taken in more than $220 million worldwide, surpassing Jim Carrey's previous comedy Fun with Dick and Jane but falling short of his 2003 film Bruce Almighty.

=== Critical reception ===
Yes Man received mixed reviews. Review aggregator Rotten Tomatoes gave the film a rating of 45%, based on 155 reviews, with an average rating of 5.3. The site's consensus reads, "Jim Carrey's comic convulsions are the only bright spots in this otherwise dim and predictable comedy." On Metacritic, the film has a score of 46 out of 100, based on 30 critics, indicating "mixed or average reviews". Audiences polled by CinemaScore gave the film an average grade of "A−" on an A+ to F scale.

Many critics thought that its plot was too similar to Carrey's 1997 film Liar Liar.

In his review for The Miami Herald, Rene Rodriguez wrote, "Yes Man is fine as far as Jim Carrey comedies go, but it's even better as a love story that just happens to make you laugh." Roger Ebert of the Chicago Sun Times gave the film 2 out of 4, and compared it to Liar Liar. He said "Jim Carrey works the premise for all it's worth, but it doesn't allow him to bust loose and fly."

=== Accolades ===
2009 BMI Film Music Award
BMI Film Music Award – Lyle Workman (Won)
2009 Taurus World Stunt Awards
Best Overall Stunt by a Woman – Monica Braunger (Nominated)
2009 Artios Awards
Outstanding Achievement in Casting – David Rubin & Richard Hicks (Nominated)
2009 MTV Movie Awards
Best Comedic Performance – Jim Carrey (Won)
2009 Teen Choice Awards
Choice Movie Actor – Comedy – Jim Carrey (Nominated)
Choice Movie Rockstar Moment – Jim Carrey (Nominated)
Choice Movie Hissy Fit – Jim Carrey (Nominated)
Choice Movie: Comedy (Nominated)
2009 Kid's Choice Awards
Favorite Movie Actor – Jim Carrey (Nominated)

== Bibliography ==
- Wallace, Danny (November 2008). Yes Man (Paperback). Simon Spotlight Entertainment. ISBN 978-1-4165-9553-3.
