= Curl Girls =

TV series from the United States of America

- Genre: Reality television
- No. of seasons: 1
- No. of episodes: 6

Original release
- Network: Logo
- Release: June 18, 2007

Curl Girls is a six-part American reality television series that premiered on Logo on June 18, 2007. Curl Girls is the first lesbian reality show on a major television channel. It chronicles the friendships and careers of Gingi, Michele, Melissa, Erin, Vanessa, and Jessica—six young lesbian women.

Despite their differences, all the women enjoy surfing. They compete to win a trip to Hawaii, but the competition strains their relationships.

== Episodes ==
101 – “Hit the Waves”
Hit the waves with the Curl Girls: Gingi, Michele, Melissa, Erin, Vanessa, and Jessica as they talk about relationships, tattoos, and surf etiquette. While Jessica and Melissa's relationship is on the rocks, newcomer Gingi strains the group dynamic. Team tension mounts as the ladies organize a friendly surf competition.

102 – “Surfriders”
As Gingi and Vanessa talk about their shared love of design, controversy over Gingi's sexuality emerges. Michele can get Rebecca to judge the surfing competition if the girls agree to make it a fundraiser for an environmental organization, The Surfrider Foundation. The teams practice and Michele hosts a backyard barbecue where Jessica and Melissa have a talk.

103 – “San Diego or Bust!”
Gingi tries to make peace with Jessica as the girls take a trip to San Diego to ride some different waves and hire a private instructor. Michele praises Gingi's progress in the private lessons while Erin questions Jessica's commitment to their team.

104 – “Out On the Town”

Erin makes some progress in helping Jessica on Jessica's terms until past issues interfere. When the two girls loosen up during a night on the town, jealousies are sparked in Gingi.

105 – “Uppin’ the Stakes”
Melissa organizes a mock-competition to set her team's mindset for victory. Vanessa's fashion show fuels drama amongst the ladies. Changes in team progress lead Erin to up the stakes of the competition.

106 – “The Winner Takes All”
The day of the competition arrives. Actress/model Jenny Shimizu emcees the event along with representatives from The Surfrider Foundation. San Francisco band Von Iva performs.
