= List of songs recorded by She & Him =

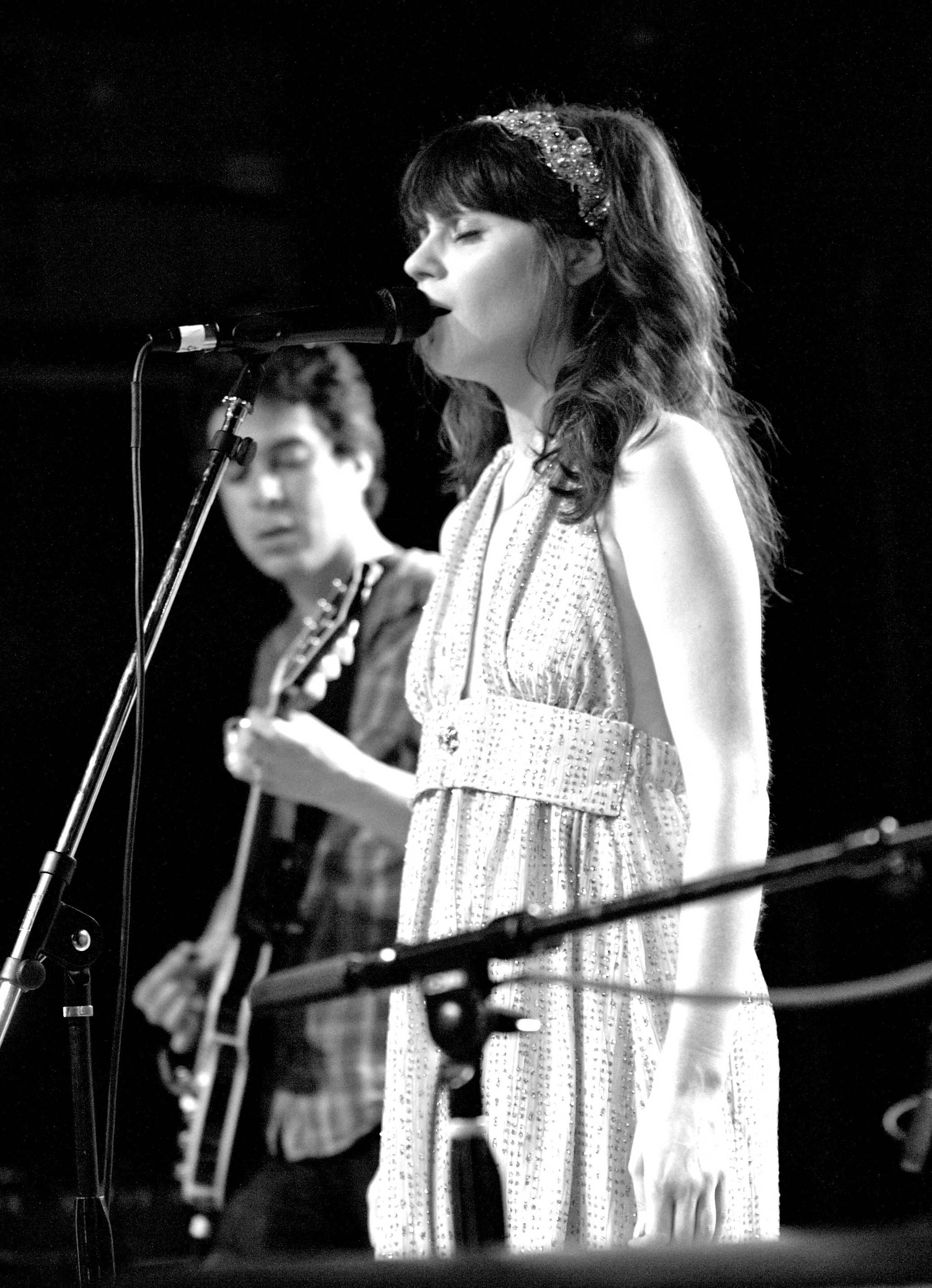
She & Him performing in Nashville, Tennessee in 2008

She & Him is an American musical duo consisting of members Zooey Deschanel and M. Ward. They have recorded songs for six studio albums and an extended play (EP), as well as various other releases. The two formed the band after working on their rendition of Richard and Linda Thompson's "When I Get to the Border", which was included on the soundtrack of Martin Hynes's 2007 film The Go-Getter and was used during its closing credits. Described as "a collection of vintage-sounding country-tinged songs", their debut album Volume One was released under indie label Merge Records in 2008. Deschanel wrote all of the album's original tracks, except "Sweet Darlin'", which she co-wrote with Jason Schwartzman.

In 2009, they recorded two songs for M. Ward's sixth studio album Hold Time and contributed a cover version of The Smiths' "Please, Please, Please, Let Me Get What I Want" to the (500) Days of Summer soundtrack. Deschanel penned eleven tracks for their followed-up release Volume Two (2010), where her lyrics touch on themes of romance and self-appreciation. The following year saw both artists performed three songs for the animated musical film Winnie the Pooh, including the theme song and an original composition named "So Long". For the latter work, Deschanel received a Grammy nomination for Best Song Written for Visual Media at its 54th ceremony. The duo's first Christmas album A Very She & Him Christmas was released in 2011, in which they recorded twelve cover versions of Christmas standards over the course of six days.

In 2012, M. Ward featured Deschanel on "Me and My Shadow" and "Sweetheart" from his album A Wasteland Companion. The two's fourth studio album, Volume 3 (2013) features more "disco grooves [and] string arrangements" than their previous works. The "bleached-out-in-the-sun pop record" included three covers and eleven tracks written by Deschanel—four of which later appeared on the duo's digital-only EP The Capitol Studios Session the same year. After signing with Columbia Records, She & Him started working on their major-label debut Classics (2014) with thirteen covers of classic tracks, recorded live and accompanied by a 20-piece orchestra, in which M. Ward helped with strings arrangement. Their second Christmas release, Christmas Party contains twelve holiday-themed tracks, was released in 2016.

She & Him was also involved in a number of side-projects. In 2010, they covered The Band's "Shape I'm In" and "Fools Rush In" exclusively for the Levi's "Shape What's to Come" and "Pioneer Sessions" campaigns, respectively. That same year, they performed "Earth" on Chickens in Love: An Album to Benefit 826LA, a collaborative project with 826LA which features songs written by students ages seven to thirteen. They later contributed their renditions of The Crickets' "Oh Boy" for the 2011 Buddy Holly tribute album, Rave On Buddy Holly and Roger Miller's "King of the Road" for the charity release Sweet Relief III: Pennies from Heaven (2013). In 2015, She & Him collaborated with musician Brian Wilson on the track "On The Island" from his eleventh studio album No Pier Pressure.

== Songs ==
Key
†	Indicates single release
‡	Indicates songs written solely by Zooey Deschanel

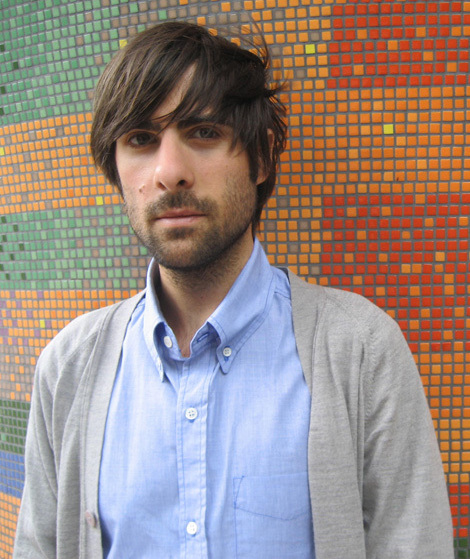
Jason Schwartzman co-wrote "Sweet Darlin'" with Deschanel for She & Him's debut Volume One in 2010.

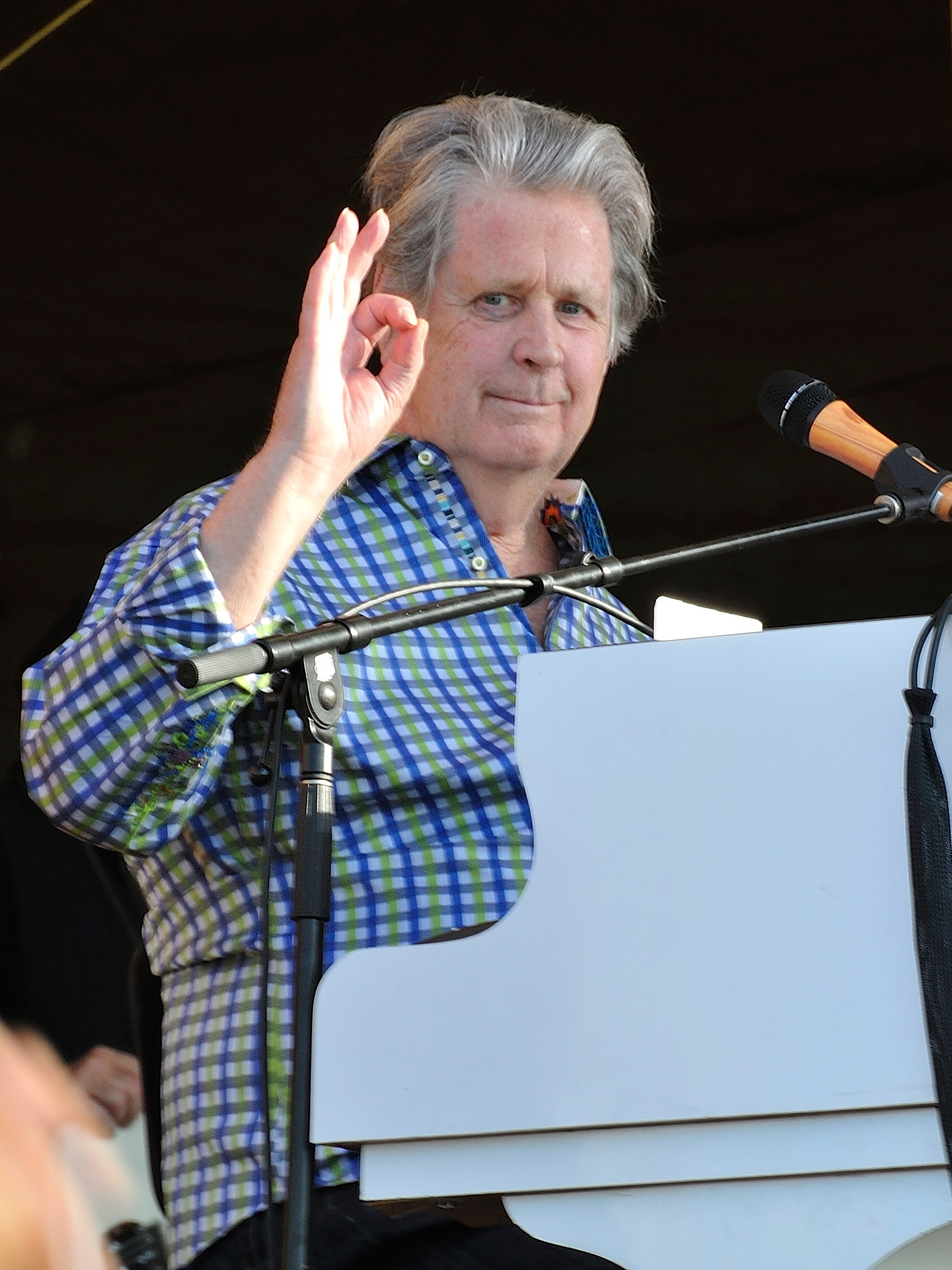
The two had covered three songs of Brian Wilson in the past, they later appeared as guest artists on Wilson's "On The Island", a song from his 2015 album No Pier Pressure.

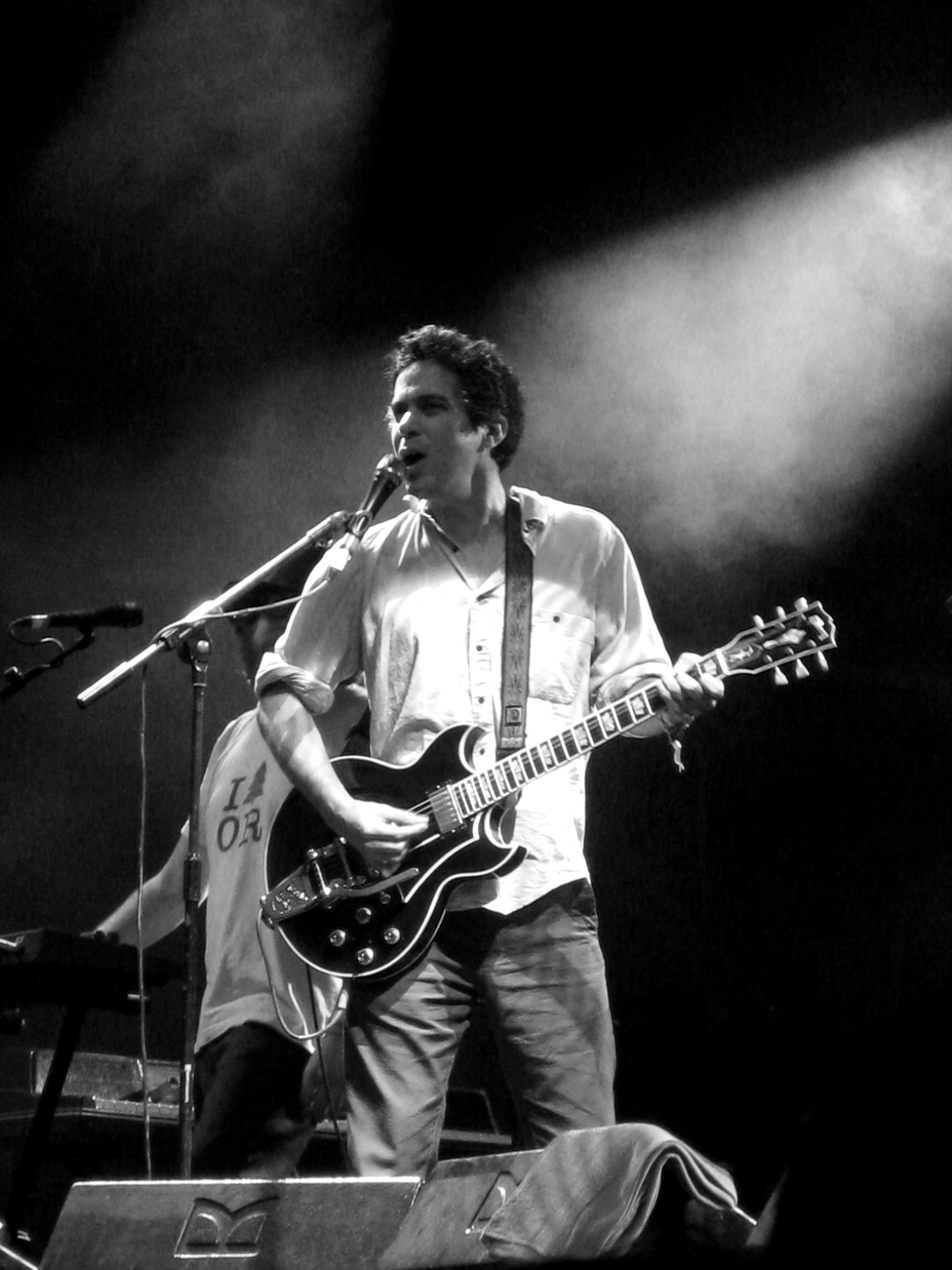
Deschanel featured on two M. Ward's solo studio albums, Hold Time (2009) and A Wasteland Companion (2012).

List of songs recorded by She & Him
Song	Artist(s)	Writer(s)	Album	Year	Ref.
"All I Want for Christmas Is You"	She & Him	Mariah Carey; Walter Afanasieff	Christmas Party	2016	
"Baby"	She & Him	George Morton; Jeff Barry; Ellie Greenwich	Volume 3	2013	
"Baby, It's Cold Outside" †	She & Him	Frank Loesser	A Very She & Him Christmas	2011	
"Black Hole"	She & Him	Zooey Deschanel ‡	Volume One	2008	
"Blue Christmas"	She & Him	Billy Hayes; Jay W. Johnson	A Very She & Him Christmas	2011	
"Brand New Shoes"	She & Him	Zooey Deschanel ‡	Volume Two	2010	
"Change Is Hard"	She & Him	Zooey Deschanel ‡	Volume One	2008	
"Christmas Memories"	She & Him	Alan Bergman; Marilyn Bergman; Domenick Costa	Christmas Party	2016	
"Christmas Day" †	She & Him	Brian Wilson	A Very She & Him Christmas	2011	
"Christmas Don't Be Late"	She & Him	Ross Bagdasarian	Christmas Party	2016	
"The Christmas Song"	She & Him	Bob Wells; Mel Tormé	A Very She & Him Christmas	2011	
"The Christmas Waltz"	She & Him	Sammy Cahn; Jule Styne	A Very She & Him Christmas	2011	
"Christmas Wish"	She & Him	Joey Spampinato	A Very She & Him Christmas	2011	
"The Coldest Night of the Year"	She & Him	Barry Mann; Cynthia Weil	Christmas Party	2016	
"Don't Look Back"	She & Him	Zooey Deschanel ‡	Volume Two	2010	
"Earth"	She & Him	Hot Fudge	Chickens in Love: An Album to Benefit 826LA	2010	
"Fools Rush In" †	She & Him	Johnny Mercer; Rube Bloom	Non-album single	2010	
"God Only Knows" †	She & Him	Brian Wilson; Tony Asher	Non-album single	2014	
"Gonna Get Along Without You Now"	She & Him	Milton Kellem	Volume Two	2010	
"Got Me"	She & Him	Zooey Deschanel ‡	Volume One	2008	
"Happy Holiday"	She & Him	Irving Berlin	Christmas Party	2016	
"Have Yourself a Merry Little Christmas"	She & Him	Ralph Blane; Hugh Martin	A Very She & Him Christmas	2011	
"He Gives His Love to Me" (Note: The song was released with two versions: "She Gives Her Love to Me" and "He Gives His Love to Me".)	She & Him	M. Ward	Universal Love	2018	
"Hold Me, Thrill Me, Kiss Me"	She & Him	Harry Noble	Volume 3	2013	
"Home"	She & Him	Zooey Deschanel ‡	Volume Two	2010	
"I Can Hear Music"	She & Him	Jeff Barry; Ellie Greenwich; Phil Spector	Volume Two (Japanese release) (Note: "I Can Hear Music" was also available as the B-side of "In The Sun".)	2010	
"I Could've Been Your Girl" †	She & Him	Zooey Deschanel ‡	Volume 3 and The Capitol Studios Session	2013	
"I Knew It Would Happen This Way"	She & Him	Zooey Deschanel ‡	Non-album single (Note: "I Knew It Would Happen This Way" was only available as the B-side of "Thieves".)	2010	
"I Put a Spell On You" †	She & Him	Screamin' Jay Hawkins	Non-album single	2011	
"I Should Have Known Better"	She & Him	Lennon–McCartney	Volume One	2008	
"I Thought I Saw Your Face Today"	She & Him	Zooey Deschanel ‡	Volume One	2008	
"If You Can't Sleep"	She & Him	Zooey Deschanel ‡	Volume Two	2010	
"I'll Be Home for Christmas"	She & Him	Walter Kent; Kim Gannon; Buck Ram	A Very She & Him Christmas	2011	
"I'll Never Be Free"	She & Him	Bennie Benjamin; George David Weiss	Classics	2014	
"I'm Gonna Make it Better"	She & Him	Zooey Deschanel ‡	Volume Two	2010	
"In The Sun" †	She & Him	Zooey Deschanel ‡	Volume Two	2010	
"It's Always You"	She & Him	Johnny Burke; Jimmy Van Heusen	Classics	2014	
"It's Not for Me to Say"	She & Him	Robert Allen; Al Stillman	Classics	2014	
"I've Got Your Number, Son"	She & Him	Zooey Deschanel ‡	Volume 3	2013	
"I Was Made for You"	She & Him	Zooey Deschanel ‡	Volume One	2008	
"King of the Road"	She & Him	Roger Miller	Sweet Relief III: Pennies From Heaven	2013	
"Let It Snow"	She & Him	Jule Styne; Sammy Cahn	Christmas Party	2016	
"Lingering Still" †	She & Him	Zooey Deschanel ‡	Volume Two	2010	
"Little Saint Nick"	She & Him	Brian Wilson; Mike Love	A Very She & Him Christmas	2011	
"London"	She & Him	Zooey Deschanel ‡	Volume 3	2013	
"Lotta Love"	She & Him	Neil Young	Non-album single	2010	
"The Man with The Bag"	She & Him	Dudley Brooks; Hal Stanley; Irving Taylor	Christmas Party	2016	
"A Marshmallow World"	She & Him	Carl Sigman; Peter DeRose	Christmas Party	2016	
"Me And My Shadow"	M. Ward featuring Zooey Deschanel	M. Ward	A Wasteland Companion	2012	
"Me and You"	She & Him	Zooey Deschanel ‡	Volume Two	2010	
"Mele Kalikimaka"	She & Him	Robert Alexander Anderson	Christmas Party	2016	
"Must Be Santa"	She & Him	Hal Moore; Bill Fredericks	Christmas Party	2016	
"Never Had Nobody Like You"	M. Ward featuring Zooey Deschanel	M. Ward	Hold Time	2009	
"Never Wanted Your Love" †	She & Him	Zooey Deschanel ‡	Volume 3	2013	
"Oh Boy"	She & Him	Norman Petty; Bill Tilghman; Sonny West	Rave On Buddy Holly	2011	
"Oh No Not My Baby"	She & Him	Gerry Goffin; Carole King	Classics	2014	
"On The Island"	Brian Wilson featuring She & Him	Brian Wilson; Joe Thomas	No Pier Pressure	2015	
"Over It Over Again"	She & Him	Zooey Deschanel ‡	Volume Two	2010	
"Please, Please, Please, Let Me Get What I Want"	She & Him	Johnny Marr; Morrissey	(500) Days of Summer (Music from the Motion Picture)	2009	
"Rave On"	M. Ward featuring Zooey Deschanel	Bill Tilghman; Norman Petty; Sonny West	Hold Time	2009	
"Reprise (I Could've Been Your Girl)"	She & Him	Zooey Deschanel ‡	Volume 3	2013	
"Ridin' in My Car"	She & Him	Alan G. Anderson	Volume Two	2010	
"Rockin' Around the Christmas Tree"	She & Him	Johnny Marks	A Very She & Him Christmas	2011	
"Run Run Rudolph"	She & Him	Johnny Marks; Marvin Brodie	Christmas Party	2016	
"Sentimental Heart"	She & Him	Zooey Deschanel ‡	Volume One	2008	
"Shadow of Love"	She & Him	Zooey Deschanel ‡	Volume 3 and The Capitol Studios Session	2013	
"Shape I'm In"	She & Him	Robbie Robertson	Online exclusive	2010	
"She"	She & Him	Charles Aznavour; Herbert Kretzmer	Classics	2014	
"Silver Bells"	She & Him	Jay Livingston; Ray Evans	A Very She & Him Christmas	2011	
"Sing"	She & Him	Zooey Deschanel ‡	Volume Two	2010	
"Sleigh Ride"	She & Him	Leroy Anderson; Mitchell Parish	A Very She & Him Christmas	2011	
"Snow Queen"	She & Him	Zooey Deschanel ‡	Volume 3 and The Capitol Studios Session	2013	
"So Long"	Zooey Deschanel and M. Ward	Zooey Deschanel ‡	Winnie the Pooh	2011	
"Somebody Sweet to Talk To"	She & Him	Zooey Deschanel ‡	Volume 3	2013	
"Something's Haunting You"	She & Him	Zooey Deschanel ‡	Volume 3	2013	
"Stars Fell on Alabama"	She & Him	Mitchell Parish; Frank Perkins	Classics	2014	
"Stay Awhile"	She & Him	Mike Hawker; Ivor Raymonde	Classics	2014	
"Sunday Girl"	She & Him	Chris Stein	Volume 3	2013	
"Sweet Darlin'"	She & Him	Zooey Deschanel; Jason Schwartzman	Volume One	2008	
"Sweetheart"	M. Ward featuring Zooey Deschanel	Daniel Johnston	A Wasteland Companion	2012	
"Swing Low, Sweet Chariot"	She & Him	Traditional song	Volume One	2008	
"Take It Back"	She & Him	Zooey Deschanel ‡	Volume One	2008	
"Teach Me Tonight"	She & Him	Sammy Cahn; Gene de Paul	Classics	2014	
"Thieves" †	She & Him	Zooey Deschanel ‡	Volume Two	2010	
"This Girl's in Love with You"	She & Him	Burt Bacharach; Hal David	Classics	2014	
"This Is Not a Test" †	She & Him	Zooey Deschanel ‡	Volume One	2008	
"Time After Time"	She & Him	Sammy Cahn; Jule Styne	Classics	2014	
"Together"	She & Him	Zooey Deschanel ‡	Volume 3	2013	
"Turn to White"	She & Him	Zooey Deschanel ‡	Volume 3 and The Capitol Studios Session	2013	
"Unchained Melody"	She & Him	Alex North; Hy Zaret	Classics	2014	
"We'll Meet Again"	She & Him	Hugh Charles; Ross Parker	Classics	2014	
"When I Get to the Border"	M. Ward featuring Zooey Deschanel	Richard Thompson	The Go-Getter soundtrack	2007	
"Why Do You Let Me Stay Here?" †	She & Him	Zooey Deschanel ‡	Volume One	2008	
"Winnie the Pooh"	Zooey Deschanel and M. Ward	Robert B. Sherman; Richard M. Sherman	Winnie the Pooh	2011	
"Winter Wonderland"	She & Him	Richard B. Smith; Felix Bernard	Christmas Party	2016	
"Would You Like to Take a Walk?"	She & Him	Mort Dixon; Billy Rose; Harry Warren	Classics	2014	
"You Really Got a Hold on Me"	She & Him	William Robinson Jr.	Volume One	2008	
