= She & Him discography =

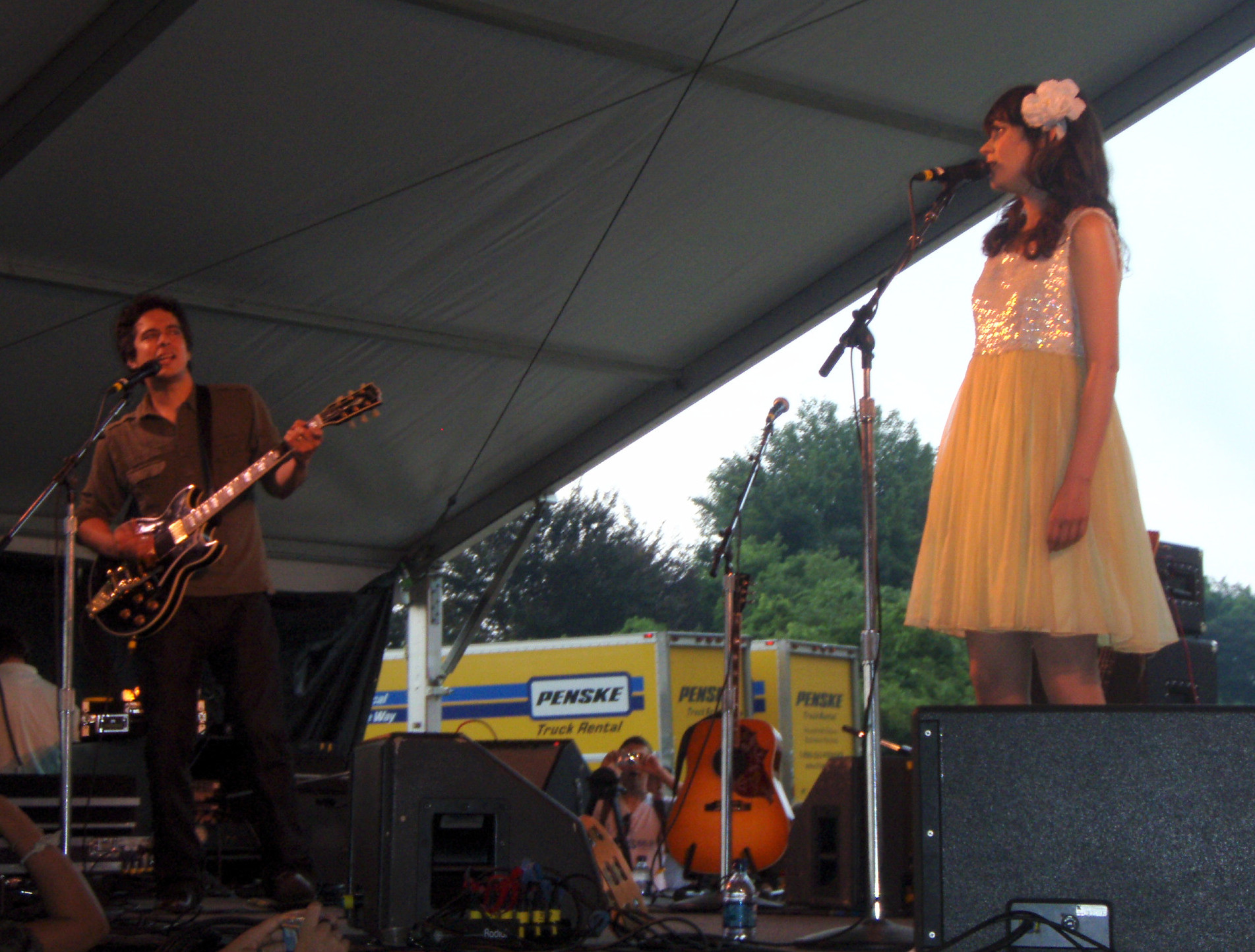
- She & Him performing at the Newport Folk Festival in 2008
- Studio albums: 7
- Extended plays: 1
- Singles: 16
- Music videos: 10

American musical duo She & Him have released seven studio albums, an extended play (EP), 16 singles and 10 music videos. The indie pop band was formed in 2006 in Portland, Oregon, and consists of Zooey Deschanel and M. Ward.

Their debut studio album, Volume One was released by Merge Records in March 2008. In the United States, it reached number seventy-one on the Billboard 200, and has sold over 300,000 copies as of 2014. Two singles were released from the set: "Why Do You Let Me Stay Here?" and "This Is Not a Test". The duo's follow-up release, Volume Two (2010) marked their first entry in different countries worldwide, including the United Kingdom, Australia, Belgium, France, and Switzerland. On the Billboard 200, it debuted at number six with 47,000 copies, becoming their highest-peaking album and sales week to date. Its first single, "In the Sun" reached number four on US Singles Sales, making it the band's most successful single.

Released in October 2011, the band's first Christmas album A Very She & Him Christmas became their best-selling record in the United States, has sold 391,000 copies as of June 2014. Six of its songs, including the single "Baby, It's Cold Outside", charted within the US Holiday Digital Sales. In May 2013, the pair released the fourth studio album Volume 3, which sold 26,000 copies during the first week of release, and debuted at number fifteen on the Billboard 200. It was likely the highest-charting set also available on cassette tape, which comprised about 1 percent of the overall first-week sales. To promote the album, the duo released the digital-only EP The Capitol Studios Session, and two singles, "Never Wanted Your Love" and "I Could've Been Your Girl". The latter work was accompanied by a music video self-directed by Deschanel.

After signing a contract with Columbia Records, the band's major-label debut Classics was released in December 2014, which scored their fourth consecutive number-one album on US Folk Albums. She & Him's second Christmas release, Christmas Party (2016) became their first studio album not to enter the Billboard 200. According to the Recording Industry Association of America (RIAA), She & Him has sold 1.07 million albums as of June 2014. Billboard reported that holiday albums account for 40 percent of their total output.

== Studio albums ==
List of studio albums, with selected chart positions, sales figures and certifications
Title	Album details	Peak chart positions										Sales	Certifications
Title	Album details	US	AUS	BEL (FL)	CAN	FRA	IRL	SCO	SPA	SWE	UK	Sales	Certifications
Volume One	Released: March 18, 2008; Label: Merge; Formats: CD, LP, digital download	71	—	—	—	—	—	—	—	—	— (Note: Volume One did not enter the UK Albums Chart, but peaked at number 38 on the UK Record Store Chart.)	US: 311,000	
Volume Two	Released: March 23, 2010; Label: Merge; Formats: CD, LP, digital download	6	49	67	—	104	29	52	87	28	62	US: 254,000	
A Very She & Him Christmas	Released: October 24, 2011; Label: Merge; Formats: CD, LP, digital download	12	91	—	—	—	—	—	—	—	145	US: 391,000	IMPALA: Silver
Volume 3	Released: May 7, 2013; Label: Merge; Formats: CD, LP, cassette, digital download	15	53	67	18	—	59	68	94	37	63	US: 26,000	
Classics	Released: December 2, 2014; Label: Columbia; Formats: CD, LP, digital download	41	77	—	—	—	—	—	—	—	—		
Christmas Party	Released: October 28, 2016; Label: Columbia; Formats: CD, LP, digital download	— (Note: Christmas Party did not enter the US Billboard 200, but peaked at number 81 on the US Top Current Albums Chart.)	—	—	—	—	—	—	—	—	—		
Melt Away: A Tribute to Brian Wilson	Released: July 22, 2022; Label: Fantasy; Formats: CD, LP, digital download	—	—	—	—	—	—	33	— (Note: Melt Away did not enter the Spanish Albums Chart, but peaked at number 32 on the Spanish Vinyl Albums Chart.)	—	— (Note: Melt Away did not enter the UK Albums Chart, but peaked at number 28 on the UK Album Sales Chart.)		
"—" denotes a recording that did not chart or was not released in that territory.

== Extended play ==
List of extended plays
Title	EP details	Notes
The Capitol Studios Session – EP	Released: December 2, 2013; Label: Merge; Format: Digital download	Released in 2013, the digital-only EP features new versions of "I Could’ve Been Your Girl", "Shadow of Love", "Snow Queen" and "Turn to White".

== Singles ==
List of singles, with selected chart positions, showing year released and album name
Title	Year	Peak chart positions										Album
Title	Year	US DL	US Sales	US AC	US Holiday DL	BEL (FL)	FRA	MEX Air.	POL	UK Sales	UK Indie	Album
"Why Do You Let Me Stay Here?"	2008	—	—	—	—	—	—	—	41	78	15	Volume One
"This Is Not a Test"	2008	—	—	—	—	—	—	—	—	—	—	Volume One
"In the Sun"	2010	—	4	—	—	—	89	—	—	55	—	Volume Two
"Thieves"	2010	—	35	—	—	—	—	—	—	—	—	Volume Two
"I Put a Spell on You"/"Lingering Still"	2010	—	—	—	—	—	—	—	—	—	—	Non-album singles
"Fools Rush In"	2010	—	—	—	—	—	—	—	—	—	—	Non-album singles
"Christmas Day"	2011	—	—	—	—	—	—	—	—	—	—	A Very She & Him Christmas
"Baby, It's Cold Outside"	2012	—	—	16	13	—	—	—	—	—	—	A Very She & Him Christmas
"Never Wanted Your Love"	2013	1	—	—	—	138	—	—	—	—	—	Volume 3
"I Could've Been Your Girl"	2013	—	—	—	—	—	—	45	—	—	—	Volume 3
"God Only Knows"	2014	—	—	—	—	—	—	—	—	—	—	Non-album singles
"He Gives His Love to Me"	2018	—	—	—	—	—	—	—	—	—	—	Non-album singles
"She Gives Her Love to Me"	2018	—	—	—	—	—	—	—	—	—	—	Non-album singles
"Holiday"	2021	—	—	—	—	—	—	—	—	62	—	Non-album singles
"I've Got My Love to Keep Me Warm"	2021	—	—	—	—	—	—	—	—	—	21	Non-album singles
"Darlin'"	2022	—	—	—	—	—	—	—	—	—	—	Melt Away: A Tribute to Brian Wilson
"—" denotes a recording that did not chart or was not released in that territory.

== Other charted songs ==
List of songs, with selected chart positions, showing year released and album name
Title	Year	Peak chart positions										Album
Title	Year	US	US Holiday DL	CAN	IRL	LTU	PHI	SGP	SWE	UK	WW	Album
"I Thought I Saw Your Face Today"	2008	40	—	37	97	45	31	30	62	97	35	Volume One
"Have Yourself a Merry Little Christmas"	2011	—	8	—	—	—	—	—	—	—	—	A Very She & Him Christmas
"The Christmas Song"	2011	—	27	—	—	—	—	—	—	—	—	A Very She & Him Christmas
"The Christmas Waltz"	2011	—	32	—	—	—	—	—	—	—	—	A Very She & Him Christmas
"Sleigh Ride"	2011	—	37	—	—	—	—	—	—	—	—	A Very She & Him Christmas
"Rockin' Around the Christmas Tree"	2011	—	38	—	—	—	—	—	—	—	—	A Very She & Him Christmas
"—" denotes a recording that did not chart or was not released in that territory.

Other contributions

- (500) Days of Summer (Music from the Motion Picture) (2009, Sire Records) – "Please, Please, Please Let Me Get What I Want" (The Smiths cover)

== Music videos ==
List of music videos, showing year released and directors
Title	Year	Director(s)	Ref(s).
"Why Do You Let Me Stay Here?" (version one)	2008	Ace Norton	
"Why Do You Let Me Stay Here?" (version two)	2009	Marc Webb	
"In the Sun"	2010	Peyton Reed	
"Thieves"	2010	Norwood Cheek	
"Don't Look Back"	2011	Jeremy Konner	
"Baby, It's Cold Outside"	2012	Elliot Dear	
"I Could've Been Your Girl"	2013	Zooey Deschanel	
"Stay Awhile"	2014	CANADA	
"Winter Wonderland"	2016	Josh Hittlemen	
"Christmas Memories"	2016	WATTS	

=== Guest appearance ===
Title	Year	Performer	Director	Ref(s).
"On the Island"	2015	Brian Wilson	Joe Thomas	

== See also ==
- List of songs recorded by She & Him
- M. Ward discography
