= List of Billboard number-one Americana/folk albums of the 2010s =

These are the albums which have reached number one on the Folk Albums chart in Billboard Magazine, listed in chronological order.

| Issue date | Album | Artist(s) | Weeks at number one | Ref. |
2009
| December 5 | Christmas in the Heart | Bob Dylan | 6 | |
2010
| January 16 | I and Love and You | The Avett Brothers | 2 | |
| January 30 | July Flame | Laura Veirs | 1 | |
| February 6 | I and Love and You | The Avett Brothers | 1 | |
| February 13 | Downtown Church | Patty Griffin | 2 | |
| February 27 | XOBC | Brandi Carlile | 1 | |
| March 6 | Sigh No More | Mumford & Sons | 1 | |
| March 13 | Have One on Me | Joanna Newsom | 4 | |
| April 10 | Volume Two | She & Him | 3 | |
| May 1 | Leave Your Sleep | Natalie Merchant | 2 | |
| May 15 | The Age of Miracles | Mary Chapin Carpenter | 1 | |
| May 22 | So Runs the World Away | Josh Ritter | 1 | |
| May 29 | Love Is Strange | Jackson Browne and David Lindley | 1 | |
| June 5 | Volume Two | She & Him | 1 | |
| June 12 | In Person & On Stage | John Prine | 1 | |
| June 19 | Sigh No More | Mumford & Sons | 3 | |
| July 10 | Broken Hearts & Dirty Windows: Songs of John Prine | Various artists | 1 | |
| July 17 | Sigh No More | Mumford & Sons | 7 | |
| September 4 | God Willin' and the Creek Don't Rise | Ray LaMontagne & The Pariah Dogs | 3 | |
| September 25 | Sigh No More | Mumford & Sons | 5 | |
| October 30 | The Age of Adz | Sufjan Stevens | 1 | |
| November 6 | The Bootleg Series Vol. 9 – The Witmark Demos: 1962–1964 | Bob Dylan | 1 | |
| November 13 | Sigh No More | Mumford & Sons | 13 | |
2011
| February 12 | Kiss Each Other Clean | Iron & Wine | 1 | |
| February 19 | Sigh No More | Mumford & Sons | 10 | |
| April 30 | Paper Airplane | Alison Krauss and Union Station | 2 | |
| May 14 | Sigh No More | Mumford & Sons | 1 | |
| May 21 | Helplessness Blues | Fleet Foxes | 2 | |
| June 4 | Sigh No More | Mumford & Sons | 2 | |
| June 18 | Ukulele Songs | Eddie Vedder | 2 | |
| July 2 | Sigh No More | Mumford & Sons | 2 | |
| July 16 | The Harrow & The Harvest | Gillian Welch | 1 | |
| July 23 | Sigh No More | Mumford & Sons | 16 | |
| November 12 | A Very She & Him Christmas | She & Him | 3 | |
| December 3 | Cities 97 Sampler, Vol. 23: Live from Studio C | Various artists | 1 | |
| December 10 | A Very She & Him Christmas | She & Him | 5 | |
2012
| January 14 | Sigh No More | Mumford & Sons | 3 | |
| February 4 | ¿Which Side Are You On? | Ani DiFranco | 1 | |
| February 11 | Chimes of Freedom: The Songs of Bob Dylan | Various artists | 1 | |
| February 18 | Old Ideas | Leonard Cohen | 1 | |
| February 25 | Sigh No More | Mumford & Sons | 1 | |
| March 3 | Barton Hollow | The Civil Wars | 1 | |
| March 10 | Voice of Ages | The Chieftains | 1 | |
| March 17 | Old Ideas | Leonard Cohen | 1 | |
| March 24 | Break It Yourself | Andrew Bird | 2 | |
| April 7 | The Hunger Games: Songs from District 12 and Beyond | Soundtrack | 6 | |
| May 19 | Blessings | Laura Story | 2 | |
| June 2 | The Hunger Games: Songs from District 12 and Beyond | Soundtrack | 1 | |
| June 9 | Sigh No More | Mumford & Sons | 1 | |
| June 16 | Here | Edward Sharpe and the Magnetic Zeros | 1 | |
| June 23 | Bear Creek | Brandi Carlile | 1 | |
| June 30 | + | Ed Sheeran | 1 | |
| July 7 | Rhythm and Repose | Glen Hansard | 1 | |
| July 14 | Sigh No More | Mumford & Sons | 1 | |
| July 21 | The Lumineers | The Lumineers | 2 | |
| August 4 | Carry Me Back | Old Crow Medicine Show | 1 | |
| August 11 | The Lumineers | The Lumineers | 7 | |
| September 29 | Tempest | Bob Dylan | 2 | |
| October 13 | Babel | Mumford & Sons | 15 | |
2013
| January 26 | The Lumineers | The Lumineers | 3 | |
| February 16 | Babel | Mumford & Sons | 13 | |
| May 18 | The Lumineers | The Lumineers | 1 | |
| May 25 | Volume 3 | She & Him | 2 | |
| June 8 | Fix Me Up | A Firm Handshake | 1 | |
| June 15 | The Lumineers | The Lumineers | 1 | |
| June 22 | The Hurry and the Harm | City and Colour | 1 | |
| June 29 | The Lumineers | The Lumineers | 2 | |
| July 13 | Babel | Mumford and Sons | 1 | |
| July 20 | The Lumineers | The Lumineers | 1 | |
| July 27 | Babel | Mumford and Sons | 2 | |
| August 10 | Edward Sharpe and the Magnetic Zeros | Edward Sharpe and the Magnetic Zeros | 1 | |
| August 17 | The Lumineers | The Lumineers | 1 | |
| August 24 | The Civil Wars | The Civil Wars | 2 | |
| September 7 | Paradise Valley | John Mayer | 2 | |
| September 21 | The Worse Things Get, the Harder I Fight, the Harder I Fight, the More I Love You | Neko Case | 1 | |
| September 28 | Paradise Valley | John Mayer | 1 | |
| October 5 | From Here to Now to You | Jack Johnson | 3 | |
| October 26 | Mountains of Sorrow, Rivers of Song | Amos Lee | 1 | |
| November 2 | Magpie and the Dandelion | The Avett Brothers | 1 | |
| November 9 | Let's Be Still | The Head and the Heart | 1 | |
| November 16 | All the Little Lights | Passenger | 3 | |
| December 7 | Shangri La | Jake Bugg | 1 | |
| December 14 | Babel | Mumford & Sons | 1 | |
| December 21 | All the Little Lights | Passenger | 1 | |
| December 28 | Live at the Cellar Door | Neil Young | 2 | |
2014
| January 11 | All the Little Lights | Passenger | 1 | |
| January 18 | Inside Llewyn Davis: Original Soundtrack Recording | Soundtrack | 2 | |
| February 1 | The River & the Thread | Rosanne Cash | 2 | |
| February 15 | All the Little Lights | Passenger | 9 | |
| April 19 | A Dotted Line | Nickel Creek | 3 | |
| May 10 | From Here to Now to You Live EP | Jack Johnson | 1 | |
| May 17 | Supernova | Ray LaMontagne | 3 | |
| June 7 | Upside Down Mountain | Conor Oberst | 1 | |
| June 14 | A Letter Home | Neil Young | 1 | |
| June 21 | Fire Within | Birdy | 1 | |
| June 28 | Whispers | Passenger | 1 | |
| July 5 | Mutineers | David Gray | 2 | |
| July 19 | Remedy | Old Crow Medicine Show | 1 | |
| July 26 | CSNY 1974 (Deluxe) | Crosby, Stills, Nash & Young | 1 | |
| August 2 | Wild Animals | Trampled by Turtles | 1 | |
| August 9 | CSNY 1974 | Crosby, Stills, Nash & Young | 1 | |
| August 16 | Remedy | Old Crow Medicine Show | 2 | |
| August 30 | Whispers | Passenger | 1 | |
| September 6 | Remedy | Old Crow Medicine Show | 1 | |
| September 13 | Swimmin' Time | Shovels & Rope | 1 | |
| September 20 | Songs from an Open Book | Justin Furstenfeld | 1 | |
| September 27 | Ryan Adams | Ryan Adams | 2 | |
| October 11 | Popular Problems | Leonard Cohen | 1 | |
| October 18 | Down Where the Spirit Meets the Bone | Lucinda Williams | 1 | |
| October 25 | Hozier | Hozier | 1 | |
| November 1 | rose ave. | You+Me | 1 | |
| November 8 | Hozier | Hozier | 3 | |
| November 29 | My Favourite Faded Fantasy | Damien Rice | 1 | |
| December 6 | Hozier | Hozier | 2 | |
| December 20 | Classics | She & Him | 1 | |
| December 27 | Hozier | Hozier | 6 | |
2015
| February 7 | What a Terrible World, What a Beautiful World | The Decemberists | 1 | |
| February 14 | Wanted on Voyage | George Ezra | 1 | |
| February 21 | Shadows in the Night | Bob Dylan | 1 | |
| February 28 | Hozier | Hozier | 3 | |
| March 21 | The Firewatcher's Daughter | Brandi Carlile | 1 | |
| March 28 | Hozier | Hozier | 1 | |
| April 4 | Tracker | Mark Knopfler | 1 | |
| April 11 | Sometimes I Sit and Think, and Sometimes I Just Sit | Courtney Barnett | 1 | |
| April 18 | Carrie & Lowell | Sufjan Stevens | 1 | |
| April 25 | Strange Trails | Lord Huron | 1 | |
| May 2 | Carrie & Lowell | Sufjan Stevens | 1 | |
| May 9 | Hozier | Hozier | 3 | |
| May 30 | Dark Bird Is Home | The Tallest Man on Earth | 1 | |
| June 6 | The Voice: The Complete Season 8 Collection | Sawyer Fredericks | 1 | |
| June 13 | Hozier | Hozier | 1 | |
| June 20 | All Your Favorite Bands | Dawes | 1 | |
| June 27 | Beneath the Skin | Of Monsters and Men | 1 | |
| July 4 | Before This World | James Taylor | 5 | |
| August 8 | Something More Than Free | Jason Isbell | 3 | |
| August 29 | Another One | Mac DeMarco | 1 | |
| September 5 | Something More Than Free | Jason Isbell | 1 | |
| September 12 | Nathaniel Rateliff & the Night Sweats | Nathaniel Rateliff & the Night Sweats | 1 | |
| September 19 | Brand New | Ben Rector | 1 | |
| September 26 | Nathaniel Rateliff & the Night Sweats | Nathaniel Rateliff & the Night Sweats | 1 | |
| October 3 | Picking Up the Pieces | Jewel | 1 | |
| October 10 | 1989 | Ryan Adams | 3 | |
| October 31 | If I Should Go Before You | City & Colour | 1 | |
| November 7 | Sermon on the Rocks | Josh Ritter | 1 | |
| November 14 | Divers | Joanna Newsom | 1 | |
| November 21 | 1989 | Ryan Adams | 1 | |
| November 28 | The Bootleg Series, Vol. 12: 1965 - 1966, The Best Of The Cutting Edge | Bob Dylan | 1 | |
| December 5 | Bluenote Café | Neil Young | 1 | |
| December 12 | Nathaniel Rateliff & the Night Sweats | Nathaniel Rateliff & the Night Sweats | 1 | |
| December 19 | Hozier | Hozier | 1 | |
| December 26 | ONXRT: Live From the Archives, Volume 17 | Various Artists | 1 | |
2016
| January 2 | 1989 | Ryan Adams | 1 | |
| January 9 | Nathaniel Rateliff & The Night Sweats | Nathaniel Rateliff & The Night Sweats | 3 | |
| January 30 | Tomorrow Is My Turn | Rhiannon Giddens | 1 | |
| February 6 | Nathaniel Rateliff & The Night Sweats | Nathaniel Rateliff & The Night Sweats | 1 | |
| February 13 | Fifteen | Green River Ordinance | 1 | |
| February 20 | Nathaniel Rateliff & the Night Sweats | Nathaniel Rateliff & the Night Sweats | 1 | |
| February 27 | The Ghosts of Highway 20 | Lucinda Williams | 1 | |
| March 5 | Chaos and the Calm | James Bay | 1 | |
| March 12 | Side Pony | Lake Street Dive | 1 | |
| March 19 | Dig In Deep | Bonnie Raitt | 1 | |
| March 26 | Ouroboros | Ray LaMontagne | 1 | |
| April 2 | You and I | Jeff Buckley | 1 | |
| April 9 | Southern Family | Various Artists | 1 | |
| April 16 | Beautiful Lies | Birdy | 1 | |
| April 23 | Are You Serious | Andrew Bird | 1 | |
| April 30 | Cleopatra | The Lumineers | 1 | |
| May 7 | A Sailor's Guide to Earth | Sturgill Simpson | 1 | |
| May 14 | Cleopatra | The Lumineers | 3 | |
| June 4 | Traveller | Chris Stapleton | 1 | |
| June 11 | Fallen Angels | Bob Dylan | 1 | |
| June 18 | Traveller | Chris Stapleton | 1 | |
| June 25 | Stranger to Stranger | Paul Simon | 1 | |
| July 2 | Traveller | Chris Stapleton | 1 | |
| July 9 | Johannesburg (EP) | Mumford & Sons with Baaba Maal, The Very Best & Beatenberg | 1 | |
| July 16 | True Sadness | The Avett Brothers | 1 | |
| July 23 | Traveller | Chris Stapleton | 7 | |
| September 10 | Pure and Simple | Dolly Parton | 2 | |
| September 24 | Traveller | Chris Stapleton | 1 | |
| October 1 | Signs of Light | The Head and the Heart | 1 | |
| October 8 | We're All Gonna Die | Dawes | 1 | |
| October 15 | Traveller | Chris Stapleton | 1 | |
| October 22 | 22, A Million | Bon Iver | 2 | |
| November 5 | Like an Arrow | Blackberry Smoke | 1 | |
| November 12 | You Want It Darker | Leonard Cohen | 1 | |
| November 19 | Traveller | Chris Stapleton | 2 | |
| December 3 | You Want It Darker | Leonard Cohen | 1 | |
| December 10 | Traveller | Chris Stapleton | 9 | |
2017
| February 11 | The Search for Everything: Wave One | John Mayer | 1 | |
| February 18 | Traveller | Chris Stapleton | 3 | |
| March 11 | Prisoner | Ryan Adams | 1 | |
| March 18 | The Search for Everything: Wave Two | John Mayer | 1 | |
| March 25 | Windy City | Alison Krauss | 1 | |
| April 1 | Traveller | Chris Stapleton | 3 | |
| April 22 | Big Little Lies: Music From The HBO Limited Series | Soundtrack | 1 | |
| April 29 | Pure Comedy | Father John Misty | 1 | |
| May 6 | The Search for Everything | John Mayer | 2 | |
| May 20 | Sad Clowns & Hillbillies | John Mellencamp featuring Carlene Carter | 1 | |
| May 27 | From A Room: Volume 1 | Chris Stapleton | 6 | |
| July 8 | The Nashville Sound | Jason Isbell & The 400 Unit | 1 | |
| July 15 | From A Room: Volume 1 | Chris Stapleton | 5 | |
| August 19 | Traveller | Chris Stapleton | 4 | |
| September 16 | Beast Epic | Iron & Wine | 1 | |
| September 23 | Traveller | Chris Stapleton | 1 | |
| September 30 | All the Light Above It Too | Jack Johnson | 1 | |
| October 7 | Southern Blood | Gregg Allman | 1 | |
| October 14 | Roll with the Punches | Van Morrison | 1 | |
| October 21 | Traveller | Chris Stapleton | 2 | |
| November 4 | Carry Fire | Robert Plant | 1 | |
| November 11 | A Long Way From Your Heart | The Turnpike Troubadours | 1 | |
| November 18 | Traveller | Chris Stapleton | 1 | |
| November 25 | From A Room: Volume 1 | Chris Stapleton | 2 | |
| December 9 | Traveller | Chris Stapleton | 2 | |
| December 23 | From A Room: Volume 2 | Chris Stapleton | 6 | |
2018
| January 27 | Traveller | Chris Stapleton | 2 | |
| February 10 | From A Room: Volume 2 | Chris Stapleton | 3 | |
| March 3 | By the Way, I Forgive You | Brandi Carlile | 1 | |
| March 10 | Nation of Two | Vance Joy | 1 | |
| March 17 | Traveller | Chris Stapleton | 1 | |
| March 24 | Tearing At the Seams | Nathaniel Rateliff & The Night Sweats | 1 | |
| March 31 | I'll Be Your Girl | The Decemberists | 1 | |
| April 7 | Traveller | Chris Stapleton | 1 | |
| April 14 | Golden Hour | Kacey Musgraves | 2 | |
| April 28 | The Tree of Forgiveness | John Prine | 1 | |
| May 5 | Vide Noir | Lord Huron | 1 | |
| May 12 | Last Man Standing | Willie Nelson | 1 | |
| May 19 | Good Thing | Leon Bridges | 1 | |
| May 26 | Traveller | Chris Stapleton | 1 | |
| June 2 | Tell Me How You Really Feel | Courtney Barnett | 1 | |
| June 9 | Traveller | Chris Stapleton | 1 | |
| June 16 | God's Favorite Customer | Father John Misty | 1 | |
| June 23 | Traveller | Chris Stapleton | 2 | |
| July 7 | Magic | Ben Rector | 1 | |
| July 14 | Traveller | Chris Stapleton | 4 | |
| August 11 | Lifers | Cody Jinks | 1 | |
| August 18 | Traveller | Chris Stapleton | 9 | |
| October 20 | Evening Machines | Gregory Alan Isakov | 1 | |
| October 27 | Look Now | Elvis Costello & the Imposters | 1 | |
| November 3 | Live From the Ryman | Jason Isbell & The 400 Unit | 1 | |
| November 10 | Traveller | Chris Stapleton | 1 | |
| November 17 | Interstate Gospel | Pistol Annies | 1 | |
| November 24 | Traveller | Chris Stapleton | 1 | |
| December 1 | Delta | Mumford & Sons | 3 | |
| December 22 | Other People's Stuff | John Mellencamp | 1 | |
| December 29 | Delta | Mumford & Sons | 2 | |
2019
| January 12 | Traveller | Chris Stapleton | 6 | |
| February 23 | Golden Hour | Kacey Musgraves | 3 | |
| March 16 | Wasteland, Baby! | Hozier | 4 | |
| April 13 | Traveller | Chris Stapleton | 2 | |
| April 27 | Golden Hour | Kacey Musgraves | 1 | |
| May 4 | Traveller | Chris Stapleton | 3 | |
| May 25 | Here Comes the Cowboy | Mac Demarco | 1 | |
| June 1 | Living Mirage | The Head and the Heart | 1 | |
| June 8 | Traveller | Chris Stapleton | 3 | |
| June 29 | Western Stars | Bruce Springsteen | 1 | |
| July 6 | Ride Me Back Home | Willie Nelson | 1 | |
| July 13 | Traveller | Chris Stapleton | 5 | |
| August 17 | Country Squire | Tyler Childers | 1 | |
| August 24 | I, I | Bon Iver | 1 | |
| August 31 | Traveller | Chris Stapleton | 2 | |
| September 14 | Threads | Sheryl Crow | 1 | |
| September 21 | The Highwoman | The Highwomen | 1 | |
| September 28 | III | The Lumineers | 1 | |
| October 5 | Jaime | Brittany Howard | 1 | |
| October 12 | Whiskey Myers | Whiskey Myers | 1 | |
| October 19 | Ode to Joy | Wilco | 1 | |
| October 26 | After the Fire | Cody Jinks | 1 | |
| November 2 | The Wanting | Cody Jinks | 1 | |
| November 9 | Colorado | Neil Young/Crazy Horse | 1 | |
| November 16 | The Bootleg Series Vol. 15: Travelin' Thru, 1967–1969 | Bob Dylan featuring Johnny Cash | 1 | |
| November 23 | Traveller | Chris Stapleton | 2 | |
| December 7 | Thanks for the Dance | Leonard Cohen | 1 | |
| December 14 | Traveller | Chris Stapleton | 9 | |
