= Melt Away =

Melt Away may refer to

- Melt Away: A Tribute to Brian Wilson, 2022 album by She & Him
- "Melt Away", 1988 Brian Wilson song from his album Brian Wilson
- "Melt Away", 1995 Mariah Carey song from her album Daydream
