= Must Be Santa (song) =

Christmas song written by Hal Moore and Bill Fredericks

"Must Be Santa" is a Christmas song written by Hal Moore and Bill Fredericks and first released in November 1960 by Mitch Miller on Columbia 41814 (45 rpm). A cover version by Tommy Steele reached Number 40 on the UK Singles Chart a year later. Another cover, by Joan Regan made number 42 a week later.

A contrafactum of a German drinking song (Schnitzelbank), "Must Be Santa" is structured as a call and response, with the lead singer posing the question of who has a certain feature, with a chorus responding that Santa Claus has said feature. After every other verse, the list of features mentioned up to that point is reiterated, followed by the chorus of "must be Santa" repeated three times and ending with "Santa Claus".

Example:

Lead singer: Who laughs this way, ho ho ho?
Chorus: Santa laughs this way, ho ho ho!
All: Ho ho ho, cherry nose, cap on head, suit that's red...

== Bob Dylan version ==
In November 2009, Bob Dylan released a version of the song in a polka-meets-klezmer style (based on an arrangement by Brave Combo, whose version he had played on Theme Time Radio Hour) for his Christmas album, Christmas in the Heart. The New York Daily News described Dylan's version as such: "It's sort of unclear if Dylan (...) was aiming to celebrate the holiday, or gently poke fun at the music's Norman Rockwell-esque simplicity". Following Brave Combo's lead, the lyrics in Dylan's version mix in the names of several United States presidents with a list of Santa's reindeer (e.g., "Dasher, Dancer, Prancer, Vixen / Carter, Reagan, Bush, and Clinton"). Eleven years after its release, "Must Be Santa" placed 24th in a Rolling Stone article about the "25 Best Bob Dylan Songs of the 21st Century" where critic Amanda Martoccio called the song "zany" and the "centerpiece" of Christmas in the Heart.

Nash Edgerton directed an official music video for "Must Be Santa", described as "bonkers" by Martoccio, in which Dylan lip synchs the song at a raucous Christmas house party with other holiday revelers. Count Smokula makes an unexpected appearance as an accordion player, miming the accordion part that David Hidalgo played on the actual recording. As of Christmas 2024, the video had been viewed over 8 million times on YouTube, significantly more times than the next most popular versions of the song (i.e., those recorded by Mitch Miller, Raffi and Brave Combo). "Must Be Santa" was also released as a music video ecard and a 7" single, the b-side of which is a recording of Dylan reading 'Twas the Night Before Christmas that was first broadcast on Theme Time Radio Hour.

== She & Him version ==
Indie folk duo She & Him included a version of the song on their 2016 album Christmas Party. Based on Dylan's version, it updates the list of presidents to include both Barack Obama and Hillary Clinton. It was recorded in the summer of 2016, before Clinton lost that November's presidential election to Donald Trump.

== Other covers ==
Other well-known artists who have covered the song include The Irish Rovers and children's musician Raffi. Another cover was made by characters from the Pokémon animated series on the Pokémon Christmas Bash album.
