= Would You Like to Take a Walk? =

Song
- Published: 1930
- Label: Remick Music Corporation
- Composer: Harry Warren
- Lyricists: Mort Dixon; Billy Rose

"Would You Like to Take a Walk?" is a popular song with music by Harry Warren and lyrics by Mort Dixon and Billy Rose. It was added to the 1930 Broadway show Sweet and Low starring James Barton, Fannie Brice and George Jessel. The song was published in 1930 by Remick Music Corporation.

== Cover versions ==
The song has become a pop standard, recorded by many artists including:

- Rudy Vallée and His Connecticut Yankees in 1931.
- Annette Hanshaw in 1931.
- Roy Fox and His Band (vocal by Al Bowlly) - recorded April 21, 1931. (Al Bowlly discography)
- Ella Fitzgerald and Louis Armstrong recorded the song for Decca in 1951, accompanied by the Dave Barbour Orchestra. It was later included on Ella's Decca album "Ella and Her Fellas".
- Jerry Vale and Peggy King - included in the album Girl Meets Boy (1955).
- Pat Boone - for his album Howdy! (1956).
- Bing Crosby and Rosemary Clooney recorded the song for their radio show in 1958 and it was subsequently released on the CD Bing & Rosie - The Crosby-Clooney Radio Sessions (2010).
- Steve Lawrence and Eydie Gorme - included in their album Cozy (1961)
- She & Him - included in the album Classics (2014).

It plays in the 1939 Porky Pig cartoon Naughty Neighbors and the 1942 Daffy Duck cartoon The Daffy Duckaroo. It also can be heard in the background of 1945's State Fair.
