= Christmas in the Heart =

2009 studio album by Bob Dylan

Studio album by Bob Dylan
- Released: October 13, 2009
- Recorded: May 2009
- Studios: Groove Masters, Santa Monica, California
- Genre: Christmas music
- Length: 42:21
- Languages: English, Latin on "O Come, All Ye Faithful"
- Label: Columbia
- Producer: Jack Frost (Bob Dylan's pseudonym)

Bob Dylan chronology
Together Through Life (2009)	Christmas in the Heart (2009)	The Bootleg Series Vol. 9: The Witmark Demos: 1962–1964 (2010)

Bob Dylan studio album chronology
Together Through Life (2009)	Christmas in the Heart (2009)	Tempest (2012)

Singles from Christmas in the Heart
- 1. "Must Be Santa" Released: November 2009

Christmas in the Heart is the thirty-fourth studio album and first Christmas album by American singer-songwriter Bob Dylan, released on October 13, 2009, by Columbia Records. The album comprises a collection of hymns, carols, and popular Christmas songs. All Dylan's royalties from the sale of this album benefit the charities Feeding America in the US, Crisis in the UK, and the World Food Programme in perpetuity.

Dylan said that, although he was born and raised Jewish he never felt left out of Christmas during his childhood in Minnesota. Regarding the popularity of Christmas music, he said, "... it's so worldwide and everybody can relate to it in their own way".

The album opened at No. 1 on the Billboard Holiday Album chart, No. 5 on the Folk Album chart, No. 10 on the Rock Album chart and No. 23 on the overall album charts. As with most of Dylan's 21st century output, he produced it himself under the pseudonym Jack Frost.

== Recording ==
The album was recorded in May 2009 at Jackson Browne's Groove Masters Studio in Santa Monica. In addition to Dylan's Never Ending Tour band, the sessions featured contributions from other musicians including Los Lobos' David Hidalgo, Chess Records veteran Phil Upchurch, and a choir that included Amanda Barrett and Abby DeWald (better known as folk music duo The Ditty Bops).

When asked in an interview if Dylan played classic recordings of Christmas songs for the musicians as reference points, Hidalgo responded:

I mean, these songs, you know, they’ve been around forever and everybody knows them. And you have to be reverent, and you have to do them justice in a way. So, before we did 'Silver Bells,' that first day, I think we listened to Bing Crosby and Dean Martin doing it. We’d listen to, say, 'The Christmas Song.' We’d listen to Nat King Cole’s version, and we’d listen to Mel Tormé’s version, and it would be like: Well, we can’t do that – but we’ll do something that works, we’ll make it our own. You know: to try and one-up Nat Cole isn’t going to happen. So we’d come up with a different arrangement…Other songs, we’d listen to Bing Crosby and Frank Sinatra doing the same song, Burl Ives doing the same song, we’d listen to The Louvin Brothers doing that same song, and just kind of pick a direction, you know, take elements from each one, and just kind of try and find something, until Bob felt the band had a feel for it. If we started playing and it wasn't happening, we’d go back and rethink things. There were a few times we’d do a song and Bob would take it home and listen to it overnight, and next day he’d come back: 'Let’s try that again. We’ll do a different take on it'. It was wide open the way he works.

In an interview published by Street News Service, journalist Bill Flanagan asked Dylan why he had performed the songs in a straightforward style, and Dylan responded:

There wasn't any other way to play it. These songs are part of my life, just like folk songs. You have to play them straight too.

When Flanagan reported that some critics thought the album was an ironic treatment of Christmas songs, Dylan responded:

Critics like that are on the outside looking in. They are definitely not fans or the audience that I play to. They would have no gut level understanding of me and my work, what I can and can't do—the scope of it all. Even at this point in time they still don't know what to make of me.

== Release and promotion ==
A bewigged Bob Dylan in the music video for "Must Be Santa"

Screen capture from the music video for "The Little Drummer Boy"

Nash Edgerton directed an official music video for the song "Must Be Santa" that was released on November 16, 2009 and described as "bonkers" by Rolling Stone. The video depicts Dylan and some holiday revelers lip synching the song at a raucous Christmas house party. Count Smokula makes an unexpected appearance as an accordion player, miming the accordion part that David Hidalgo played on the actual recording. One of the guests instigates a fight and leaves the party by jumping through a living-room window. In the closing scene, Dylan and Santa Claus are on the front porch together watching the rabble-rouser's departure. As of Christmastime 2024, the video had been viewed over 8 million times on YouTube, significantly more times than the next most popular versions of the song (i.e., those recorded by Mitch Miller, Raffi, and Brave Combo). "Must Be Santa" was also released as a music video ecard and a 7" single, the B-side of which is a recording of Dylan reading 'Twas the Night Before Christmas that was first broadcast on Theme Time Radio Hour.

Dylan released a second music video to promote Christmas in the Heart, for "The Little Drummer Boy", on December 9, 2009. Directed by artist/filmmaker Jeff Scher, the video features images from classic films (actress Jane Greer appears at the 2:10 mark) and home movies that have been rotoscoped with water colors and crayons to tell a modern version of the story of the Nativity of Jesus in the song's lyrics. The video premiered on Amazon as part of the company's "12 Days of Christmas" promotion with the site linking directly to Feeding America, one of the charities benefiting from Christmas in the Heart's royalties. Dylan released a statement on Amazon along with the video, saying, "Happy Holidays Friends. Since this season is all about giving, I’d like to take a moment and mention the good people at Feeding America. They provide meals for over 25 million hungry Americans each year. If you have a moment, you can join me in contributing to this worthy charity".

== Packaging ==
The package design of Christmas in the Heart is credited to Coco Shinomiya who had designed Dylan's previous album Together Through Life. The album's cover, an illustration of a sleigh ride in a snowy landscape, is from an antique print. The back cover, an illustration of the Biblical Magi, is by artist Edwin Fotheringham. The inner sleeves feature a black-and-white photo by Leonard Freed of four musicians wearing Santa Claus suits as well as a drawing by Olivia De Berardinis of pinup Bettie Page dressed as Mrs. Claus.

== Reception and legacy ==
Professional ratings
Aggregate scores
Source	Rating
AnyDecentMusic?	5.6/10
Metacritic	62/100
Review scores
Source	Rating
Allmusic	3/5 stars
The A.V. Club	B−
Robert Christgau	(1-star Honorable Mention)
The Guardian	4/5 stars
Paste	7.5/10
Pitchfork Media	6.8/10
PopMatters	7/10 stars
Rolling Stone	3/5 stars
Slant Magazine	4/5 stars
Tiny Mix Tapes	4/5 stars

At Metacritic, the album currently holds a score of 62 out of 100 based on 17 reviews, indicating generally favorable reviews.

While the unexpected move by Dylan to record a Christmas album was received with skepticism at first, the outcome of the project was lauded by critics for bringing a fresh breath of air into these classics.

Slant Magazine's critic Jesse Cataldo awarded the album 4 stars out of 5 and said:

This enjoyable sense of exploration, which prizes levity in a genre that usually amounts to an artistic wasteland, is invaluable. It also proves how much life is left in the songs, and how much other artists have succeeded at butchering them.

Se7en magazine's critic agreed, writing:

The arrangement of his band mixes up the style of the songs, resulting in a repertoire of Christmas songs that genuinely sound like modern material, while avoiding ever being cliché.

The critic for Tiny Mix Tapes rated the album 4 stars out of 5, writing:

On Christmas in the Heart... it's not the heat, but the bitter cold, the kind you feel in northern Minnesnowta[sic]. These are traditional numbers, aged but not antiquated. In keeping with releases like Good as I Been to You and World Gone Wrong, the album features Dylan exorcising the musical spirits of the land. Some will rank it among other gimcrack releases, like Dylan & the Dead. Still others will categorize it as an oddity, like Self Portrait. It's all and none of these. These songs are Dylan's latest exploits, but they're deathly sincere (and jolly), as serious and kitschy as Theme Time Radio Hour. It's the music that introduces old Disney films, an album as dense and allusive as his other recent outings.

In 2020, Rolling Stone placed "Must Be Santa" 24th on a list of Dylan's best songs of the 21st century. The Big Issue listed the same song as #65 on a list of the "80 best Bob Dylan songs – that aren't the greatest hits". It was the only track included from Christmas in the Heart and an article accompanying the list proclaimed it to be "the best-ever Christmas album!" Dylan's version of the song has also proven influential on other artists: both She & Him, in 2016, and Kurt Vile, in 2022, have recorded the song in versions directly inspired by Dylan's.

Stereogum ran an article to coincide with Dylan's 80th birthday on May 24, 2021 in which 80 musicians were asked to name their favorite Dylan song. Girl Band's Dara Kiely selected "Hark the Herald Angels Sing" from Christmas in the Heart, noting, "It is earnest yet fun, serious yet joyful. His voice makes sense and he still means every word".

Singer/songwriter Elliott Murphy cited Dylan's performance of "Here Comes Santa Claus" on this album as one of his top 10 songs of the 21st century in an article for Poetic Justice Magazine.

== Charity project ==
It's a tragedy that more than 35 million people in this country alone—12 million of those children—often go to bed hungry and wake up each morning unsure of where their next meal is coming from. I join the good people of Feeding America in the hope that our efforts can bring some food security to people in need during this holiday season.

— Bob Dylan

Feeding America received Dylan's royalties from sales in the USA, while two further charities, the United Nations' World Food Programme and Crisis in the UK, received royalties from overseas sales.

Dylan said:

"That the problem of hunger is ultimately solvable means we must each do what we can to help feed those who are suffering and support efforts to find long-term solutions. I'm honoured to partner with the World Food Programme and Crisis in their fight against hunger and homelessness".

== Track listing ==
Christmas in the Heart track listing
No.	Title	Writer(s)	Length
1.	"Here Comes Santa Claus"	Gene Autry, Oakley Haldeman	2:35
2.	"Do You Hear What I Hear?"	Noël Regney, Gloria Shayne Baker	3:02
3.	"Winter Wonderland"	Felix Bernard, Richard B. Smith	1:52
4.	"Hark the Herald Angels Sing"	Felix Mendelssohn (music), Charles Wesley (lyrics), arranged by Bob Dylan	2:30
5.	"I'll Be Home for Christmas"	Buck Ram, Kim Gannon and Walter Kent	2:54
6.	"Little Drummer Boy"	Katherine K. Davis, Henry Onorati, Harry Simeone	2:52
7.	"The Christmas Blues"	Sammy Cahn, David Jack Holt	2:54
8.	"O' Come All Ye Faithful (Adeste Fideles)"	Traditional, arranged by Bob Dylan	2:48
9.	"Have Yourself a Merry Little Christmas"	Hugh Martin, Ralph Blane	4:06
10.	"Must Be Santa"	William Fredericks, Hal Moore	2:48
11.	"Silver Bells"	Jay Livingston, Ray Evans	2:35
12.	"The First Noel"	Traditional, arranged by Bob Dylan	2:30
13.	"Christmas Island"	Lyle Moraine	2:27
14.	"The Christmas Song"	Mel Tormé, Bob Wells	3:56
15.	"O Little Town of Bethlehem"	Traditional, arranged by Bob Dylan	2:17

== Personnel ==
- Bob Dylan – vocals, guitar, electric piano, harmonica, producer
- Tony Garnier – bass guitar
- George Receli – drums, percussion
- Donnie Herron – steel guitar, mandolin, trumpet, violin
- David Hidalgo – accordion, guitar, mandolin, violin
- Phil Upchurch – guitar
- Patrick Warren – piano, organ, celeste

Additional musicians

- Amanda Barrett, Bill Cantos, Randy Crenshaw, Abby DeWald, Nicole Eva Emery, Walt Harrah, Robert Joyce – choir

Technical

- David Bianco – recording, mixing
- Bill Lane – assistant engineering
- David Spreng – additional engineering
- Glen Suravech – assistant engineering
- Rich Tosti – studio support
- Ed Wong – studio support

Artwork

- Olivia De Berandis – inside cover illustration
- Edwin Fotheringham – back cover illustration
- Leonard Freed/Magnum Photos – inside photo
- Coco Shinomiya – design
- VisualLanguage.com – front cover

== Charts ==
Chart (2009)	Peak
Austria Albums Chart	44
Belgian (Flanders) Albums Chart	22
Belgian (Wallonia) Albums Chart	89
Canada Albums Chart	33
Denmark Albums Chart	14
Dutch Albums Chart	34
French Albums Chart	119
Germany Albums Chart	37
Norway Albums Chart	5
Irish Albums Chart	34
Italy Albums Chart	27
Spain Albums Chart	54
Sweden Albums Chart	6
Switzerland Albums Chart	80
UK Albums Chart	40
US Billboard 200 Albums Chart	23
US Billboard Holiday Albums Chart	1
US Billboard Folk Albums Chart	1
US Billboard Rock Albums Chart	9

== See also ==
- List of Billboard Top Holiday Albums number ones of the 2000s
