= Chickens in Love =

Compilation album by Various artists
- Released: April 20, 2010

Chickens in Love: An Album to Benefit 826LA is a compilation album by various artists, released in April 2010.

== Background ==
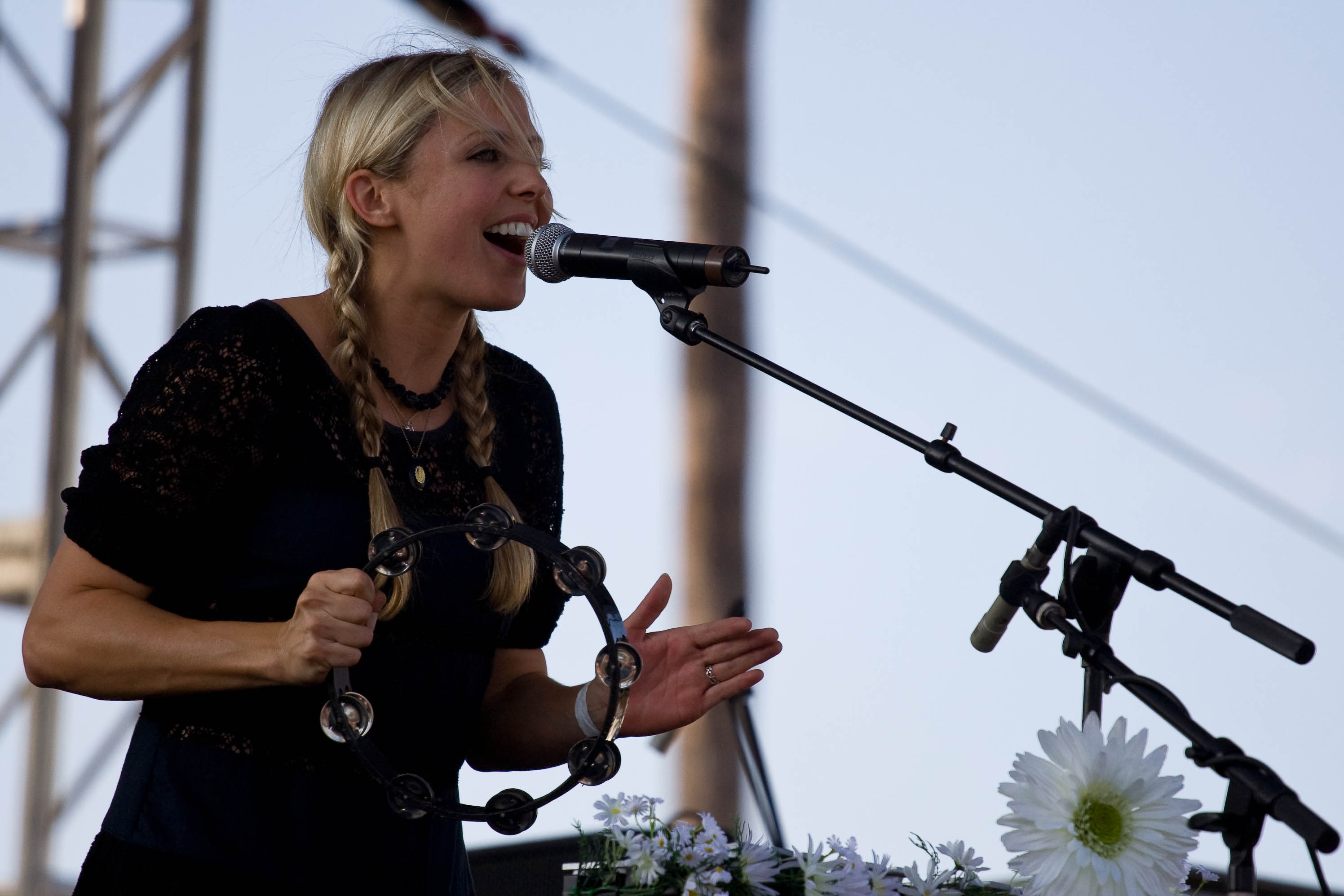
Blake Hazard of The Submarines performing in Los Angeles in 2009

The album was part of a collaborative project with 826LA, the Los Angeles-based nonprofit organization dedicated to supporting students with their creative writing skills. The album features songs by local artists, written by 826LA students ages seven to thirteen during a workshop led by The Submarines called "Songwriting with The Submarines". Band members John Dragonetti and Blake Hazard, with support from other "musically-inclined" tutors, helped students create their own bands, write original songs and record performances to showcase their work. Band names included The Gummy Bears, Hot Fudge, and Jennifer Lopez. Videos of the students' performances were made available to view online. Viewers could pledge money to benefit 826LA; participants associated with the highest-earning video won the 826LA Gold Record and an ice cream party. The concept originated from 826LA's prior "Battle of the Bands" fundraiser, in which local bands competed against one another and raised money for the organization. For the songwriting workshop and recording, 826LA partnered with Origami and its owner Neil Schield.

Related to the album, 826LA hosted a "MINI Music Festival" at The Echoplex in March 2010 featuring live performances by students, The Growlers, The Happy Hollows, The Submarines, and Summer Darling. Chickens in Love was released on April 20.

== Composition and reception ==
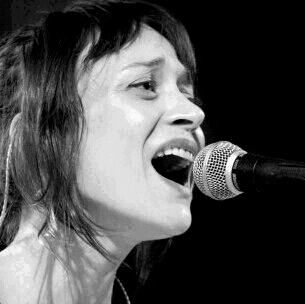
Fiona Apple in 2012

Chickens in Love consists of twelve cover songs written by 826LA students who participated in the "Songwriting with The Submarines" workshop. The album was named after the "particularly memorable tune" "Chickens in Love", performed by Edward Sharpe and the Magnetic Zeros. "Mamacita" is performed by Cold War Kids. "So Sleepy", written by The Gummy Bears, is performed by Fiona Apple featuring Jon Brion and the Punch Brothers. Stereogum described the song as having "Arcade Fire-like" lyrics ("I'm so sleepy, but it's not my bedtime / We got bells / The bells, the bells keep me awake"), with a clanging rhythm. "So Sleepy" marked Apple's first new material in five years, following her third studio album Extraordinary Machine (2005). Apple served on 826LA's advisory board at the time of the compilation's release. The following tracks are "Am I Going Crazy?" by Tim & Eric, "100 Pigs" by Crystal Antlers, and "New Beginning" by Dum Dum Girls.

The album was released as a limited edition vinyl LP.

In 2012, Baeble Music highlighted Chickens in Love as one of "[their] favorite albums to create positive social impacts in supporting the children of a community". Joe Paglisi of Baeble wrote that the compilation serves as a "charming reminder of the importance of arts in our schools". Paste magazine's Kasia Pilat complimented Apple's vocals ("smoldering pipes") on "So Sleepy". Stereogum suggested that the track was among the album's best, describing it as a "jumpy, sweet anti-lullaby".

== Track listing ==
1. "Chickens in Love", performed by Edward Sharpe and the Magnetic Zeros – 3:28
2. "Mamacita", performed by Cold War Kids – 2:13
3. "So Sleepy" (The Gummy Bears), performed by Fiona Apple featuring Jon Brion and the Punch Brothers – 4:14
4. "Am I Going Crazy?", performed by Tim & Eric – 2:17
5. "100 Pigs", performed by Crystal Antlers – 2:25
6. "New Beginning", performed by Dum Dum Girls – 2:05
7. "Mexican Food", performed by Summer Darling – 3:37
8. "Earth", performed by She & Him – 3:04
9. "Weird Group of Bandits", performed by The Happy Hollows – 3:47
10. "Boring", performed by The Pity Party – 4:17
11. "Jerk Anthem", performed by The Growlers – 1:45
12. "The Fun Party", performed by The Submarines – 2:24
