= Verge music festival =

The Verge Music Festival was an alternative and modern rock festival. It was run by the promoters of Summerfest and took place in Milwaukee, Wisconsin on the Summerfest Grounds. 2010, its inaugural year, was the only year that the event took place.

== 2010 (Inaugural Year) ==
The initial lineup was announced March 11, 2010 in the Milwaukee Area. The two-day festival is expected to be held annually during the first weekend of June. The 2010 Verge Music Festival was Friday, June 4, and Saturday, June 5. Weezer, Three Days Grace, and AFI headlined the 2010 festival.

=== Friday June 4 ===
- Three Days Grace
- Eagles of Death Metal, Crash Kings, She & Him, Nico Vega, Reni Lane

=== Saturday June 5 ===
- Weezer, AFI
- Cold War Kids, The Raveonettes, Rogue Wave, among others.

More bands are to be announced in the coming years.

== See also ==
- List of festivals in the United States
