= Thieves (She & Him song) =

Single by She & Him

from the album Volume Two
- B-side: "I Knew It Would Happen This Way"
- Released: 14 June 2010
- Genre: Indie pop, Indie folk
- Length: 4:08
- Label: Merge
- Songwriter(s): Zooey Deschanel
- Producer(s): M. Ward

She & Him singles chronology
"In the Sun" (2010)	"Thieves" (2010)

"Thieves" is a song by American duo She & Him. Written by Zooey Deschanel, the song was released as the second single from the duo's second album, Volume Two. On 9 February 2010, She & Him were interviewed on BBC 6 Music and performed "Thieves" and "Gonna Get Along without You Now" from the not-yet-released album. Two versions of the song "Thieves" were made available online. One was that played for the BBC interview and two weeks later Stereogum premiered the studio version from the album.

On 9 July 2010, a video of "Thieves" directed by Norwood Cheek was released on Pitchfork Media.

"Thieves" was released by Merge Records on 31 August 2010, with "I Knew It Would Happen This Way" on the B-side of the vinyl single.
