= In the Sun (She & Him song) =

Single by She & Him featuring Tilly and the Wall

from the album Volume Two
- B-side: "I Can Hear Music"
- Released: February 23, 2010
- Genre: Indie pop, Indie folk
- Length: 2:50
- Label: Merge
- Songwriter: Zooey Deschanel
- Producer: M. Ward

She & Him singles chronology
"Why Do You Let Me Stay Here?" (2008)	"In the Sun" (2010)	"Thieves" (2010)

"In the Sun" is a song by American duo She & Him, written by Zooey Deschanel for their second album, Volume Two. The song was released as the first single from the album on February 23, 2010, a full month ahead of the album. It was published on-line by Pitchfork on January 22, 2010. The duo performed the song on the Late Show with David Letterman on April 2, 2010 in promotion of their new album.

Interviewed by Pitchfork, songwriter Deschanel stated "I originally composed it with a classic jazz chord progression—with a little chromatic step—and it was slower. But we got in the studio and Matt [Ward asked], 'Why don't we put a Bee Gees beat on it?' And it totally came to life in a way I didn't expect." The song features backing vocals by Tilly and the Wall.

Although the single is released on vinyl, it is available to purchase on digital stores and available as high quality 320 kbit/s mp3 or FLAC through their record label.

== Music video ==
A video of "In the Sun" premiered on Pitchfork's web site on March 9, 2010. The video, set in a high school, was directed by Peyton Reed and features performances by Deschanel and Ward. The filming took place at Verdugo Hills High School.

=== Critical reception ===
James Montgomery of MTV writes about the video, "Deschanel plays the clear-eyed heroine, a sweet girl hopelessly in love with the bad boy (M. Ward, who actually looks like he's enjoying the role) and trying in vain to win his affections. She does this, of course, with a dreamy dance routine full of shoulder shakes and sly winks ... plus hula-hooping and the occasional lift. The fact that both band members are dressed in outfits lifted from the 1950s strangely works here. Teenagers' hearts are still the same after all these years. There's a bright, joyous feel to the clip, thanks to the direction of Peyton Reed, ... and the genuine look of thrill Deschanel sports throughout. She delights in each dance step, as if she can't believe she's pulling it off. "

== Charts ==
Chart (2010)	Peak position
France (SNEP)	89
