= Why Do You Let Me Stay Here? =

Single by She & Him

from the album Volume One
- B-side: "Lotta Love"
- Released: November 17, 2008
- Length: 2:30
- Label: Double Six
- Songwriter: Zooey Deschanel
- Producer: M. Ward

She & Him singles chronology
"Why Do You Let Me Stay Here?" (2008)	"In the Sun" (2010)

"Why Do You Let Me Stay Here?" is the debut single by American duo She & Him, released on November 17, 2008 by Double Six Recordings from their first album, Volume One. The song was written by Zooey Deschanel and produced by M. Ward.

== Critical reception ==
Rolling Stone magazine ranked this song 64th in its list "The 100 Best Singles of 2008", considering it "a retro-pop duet with sweetly plaintive vocals". For MTV News, James Montgomery ranked the song the 18th best song of 2008 out of 33 and commented "it's Deschanel's big, bell-clear vocals (and that "uh-huh!") that make this one truly special." In his review of Volume One, Grayson Currin of Pitchfork Media considered the song to be "built around black-and-white, simplistic emotions and dotted with vintage sexual innuendo."

== Music videos ==
Two different music videos of this song were produced. The first video, directed by Ace Norton, featured Zooey Deschanel and M. Ward in a semi-animated enactment that premiered on MTV's program FNMTV on July 11, 2008.

The second video, released in 2009, was a collaboration of talent from the film (500) Days of Summer, including co-stars Zooey Deschanel and Joseph Gordon-Levitt with director Marc Webb, choreographer Michael Rooney, and producer Mason Novick. It begins with Gordon-Levitt walking into a bank with dark sunglasses on. He silently demands money from Deschanel, who removes his glasses, and they begin to dance. At the end, she is shown putting the glasses back on his face, and he takes the money and leaves.

== Track listings and formats ==
- US vinyl / 7" single
1. "Why Do You Let Me Stay Here?" – 2:34
2. "Lotta Love" - 3:52 (Neil Young)

== Credits and personnel ==
- Zooey Deschanel – songwriter, vocals, piano
- M. Ward – guitars, producer
- Mike Coykendall – engineering, mixing, bass, percussion
- Mike Mogis – mixing, engineering
- Adam Selzer – engineering
- Doug Van Sloun – mastering

Published by Domino Publishing Co. Ltd (PRS) (ASCAP).
