= Baby, It's Cold Outside =

1944 song by Frank Loesser

Single by Margaret Whiting and Johnny Mercer
- B-side: "I Never Heard You Say"
- Written: 1944
- Published: 1949 by Susan Publications / Edwin H Morris and Co.
- Released: May 1949
- Recorded: March 18, 1949
- Genre: Traditional pop
- Length: 2:49
- Label: Capitol
- Songwriter: Frank Loesser
- Producer: Johnny Mercer

"Baby, It's Cold Outside" is a popular song written by Frank Loesser in 1944 and popularized in the 1949 film Neptune's Daughter. While the lyrics make no mention of a holiday, it is commonly regarded as a Christmas song owing to its winter theme. The song was released in eight recordings in 1949—including well-known versions by Ella Fitzgerald and Louis Jordan, Hot Lips Page and Pearl Bailey, and Dean Martin and Marilyn Maxwell—and has been covered hundreds of times since.

== History ==
In 1944, Loesser wrote "Baby, It's Cold Outside" to sing with his wife, Lynn Garland, at their housewarming party in New York City at the Navarro Hotel. They sang the song to indicate to guests that it was time to leave. Garland has written that after the first performance, "We became instant parlor room stars. We got invited to all the best parties for years on the basis of 'Baby.' It was our ticket to caviar and truffles. Parties were built around our being the closing act." In 1948, after performing the song for years, Loesser sold it to MGM for the 1949 romantic comedy Neptune's Daughter. Garland was furious: "I felt as betrayed as if I'd caught him in bed with another woman."

According to Esther Williams, the producers of Neptune's Daughter had planned to use a different Loesser song, "On a Slow Boat to China", but studio censors thought it was too suggestive and replaced it with "Baby."

The song won the 1950 Academy Award for Best Original Song.

== Lyrics ==
The song is a call and response duet between two people: a host and a guest, usually performed by male and female singers respectively. Every line in the song features a statement from the guest followed by a response from the host. The lyrics consist of the host trying to convince the guest that she should stay for a romantic evening because he fears her getting too cold outside, despite the fact that she feels she should return home to her concerned family and neighbors.

In the original edition from Loesser's publishing company "Susan Publications, Inc." from 1948, the host's character name is "The Wolf" and the guest "The Mouse." It's unclear of the origin or meaning of these character names; they don't occur in the film version. This edition's tempo is given as "Loesserando", a humorous reference to the composer's name.

=== Criticism ===
While studying in the United States in 1949, the future leader of the Muslim Brotherhood, Sayyid Qutb, reportedly expressed outrage with the song and its perceived decadent use at dance in a church.

Since 2009, the song has also faced criticism among some listeners for the alleged implications of its lyrics, with elements such as the line, "Say, what's in this drink?" and the "wolf's" unrelenting pressure for the "mouse" to remain in spite of her repeated suggestions that she should go home being described as suggestive of sexual harassment or even date rape.

However, others have noted that cultural expectations at the time of the song's writing were such that ladies were not socially permitted to spend the night with gentlemen to whom they were not married and that the woman states that she wants to stay, while "What's in this drink?" was a common idiom of the period used to sidestep social expectations by blaming one's loss of inhibition on the influence of alcohol. Susan Loesser, Frank Loesser's daughter, attributed the controversy to the song being associated with Bill Cosby after television programs such as Saturday Night Live and South Park satirically depicted it being performed by the comedian, who had been accused of sexually assaulting numerous women.

In 2018, the airing of the song was canceled by a number of radio stations including Canada's CBC streaming service, after social media criticism and public pressure regarding the song's lyrics. This was referred to by some media outlets as part of a wider cancel culture at the time of works liable to offend people. On November 30, 2018, Cleveland, Ohio, radio station WDOK Star 102 announced that it had removed the song from its playlist due to its lyric content, based on listener input, amid the MeToo movement. On December 4, 2018, the Canadian radio broadcasters Bell Media, CBC Radio, and Rogers Media followed suit. The decision was divisive among critics and the general public, with supporters arguing that the song's possible implications of date rape did not align with current societal norms, and others arguing that the decision was an appeal to political correctness. Station KOIT in San Francisco, having placed the song "on hold" pending listener feedback, returned it to the playlist after 77% of respondents opposed its removal. CBC Radio subsequently reinstated the song as well. Following the controversy, the song rose to the top 10 of Billboard's digital sales list for the week of December 22, 2018, with a 70% increase in downloads.

In 2019, vocalists John Legend and Kelly Clarkson also recorded the song with modified lyrics, written by Legend and Natasha Rothwell for an expanded edition of Legend's A Legendary Christmas album. The lyrical changes, which included lines from the "Wolf" emphasizing sexual consent, became a new source of controversy in their own right. Deana Martin, whose father Dean Martin had recorded a popular version of the song in 1959, criticized the new interpretation as "absurd," saying her father would not have approved of altering the lyrics (which she maintained to be more sexually explicit in the new version than in Loesser's original) in order to appease contemporary sensibilities.

== 1949 recordings ==
- Don Cornell and Laura Leslie with Sammy Kaye and his orchestra; recorded on April 12 and released by RCA Victor (peaked at No. 12 on Billboard's Records Most Played By Disk Jockeys chart, at No. 13 on Billboard's Best-Selling Popular Retail Records chart [lasting ten weeks on the chart], and at No. 17 on Billboard's Most-Played Juke Box Records chart in mid-1949)
- Hot Lips Page and Pearl Bailey; popular version recorded as well as performed live on The Ed Sullivan Show on October 9, 1949
- Bing Crosby and James Stewart, abbreviated radio performance with Stewart taking the "mouse" part, from The Bing Crosby – Chesterfield Show; released on The Bing Crosby Christmas Gift Collection
- Doris Day and Bob Hope; radio performance from The Bob Hope Show
- Ella Fitzgerald and Louis Jordan with the Tympany Five; recorded on April 28 and released by Decca Records (peaked at No. 9 on Billboard's Most-Played Juke Box Records chart and at No. 17 on Billboard's Best-Selling Popular Retail Records chart [lasting seven weeks on the latter chart] in mid-1949)
- Lynn Garland and Frank Loesser (credited as Lynn & Frank Loesser); released by Mercury Records
- Homer and Jethro and June Carter; released by RCA Victor (peaked at No. 22 on Billboard's Records Most Played By Disk Jockeys chart on the week ending August 20, 1949)
- Dean Martin and Marilyn Maxwell; radio performance from The Martin and Lewis Show; released on several compilations, including The Very Best of Dean Martin and Relax, It's Dean Martin, Vol 2
- Dinah Shore and Buddy Clark with Ted Dale and his orchestra; recorded on March 17 and released by Columbia Records (peaked at No. 3 on Billboard's Records Most Played By Disk Jockeys chart, at No. 4 on Billboard's Best-Selling Popular Retail Records chart, and at No. 6 on Billboard's Most-Played Juke Box Records chart in mid-1949)
- Margaret Whiting and Johnny Mercer with Paul Weston and his orchestra; recorded on March 18 and released by Capitol Records (peaked at No. 3 on Billboard's Records Most Played By Disk Jockeys chart, at No. 4 on Billboard's Best-Selling Popular Retail Records chart [lasting 19 weeks on the chart], and at No. 8 on Billboard's Most-Played Juke Box Records chart in mid-1949)

== Other notable recordings ==
Year	Performer	Work	Source
1959	Dean Martin and female chorus	A Winter Romance	
1961	Ray Charles and Betty Carter	Ray Charles and Betty Carter	
1966	Jimmy Smith and Wes Montgomery (instrumental)	Jimmy & Wes: The Dynamic Duo	
1994	Nancy LaMott and Michael Feinstein	Just in Time for Christmas	
1995	Lou Rawls and Dianne Reeves	Jazz to the World	
1996	Vanessa Williams and Bobby Caldwell	Star Bright	
1999	Tom Jones and Cerys Matthews	Reload	
2002	Brian Setzer and Ann-Margret	Boogie Woogie Christmas	
2002	Lee Ann Womack and Harry Connick Jr.	The Season for Romance	
2003	Zooey Deschanel and Leon Redbone	Elf: Music From The Major Motion Picture	
2006	Dean Martin and Martina McBride	Christmas with Dino	
2010	Chris Colfer and Darren Criss	Glee: The Music, The Christmas Album	
2011	She & Him	A Very She & Him Christmas	
2012	Rita Coolidge with drummer Lynn Coulter	A Rita Coolidge Christmas	
2013	Jimmy Fallon and Cecily Strong	Saturday Night Live	
2013	Lady Gaga and Joseph Gordon-Levitt	Lady Gaga and the Muppets Holiday Spectacular	
2014	Connie Britton and Will Chase	Christmas with Nashville	
2016	Jimmy Buffett and Nadirah Shakoor (Note: As in the She & Him version, Buffett and Shakoor reverse the gender-specific lyrics, with he the "Mouse" and she the "Wolf".)	'Tis the SeaSon	
2017	Willie Nelson and Lee Ann Womack		

== Charts ==
=== Dean Martin version ===
Chart (2007–2026)	Peak position
Austria (Ö3 Austria Top 40)	56
Canada (Canadian Hot 100)	46
Canada AC (Billboard) with Martina McBride	7
Euro Digital Tracks (Billboard) with Frank Sinatra & Sammy Davis Jr.	13
Germany (GfK)	58
Global 200 (Billboard)	49
Ireland (IRMA)	64
Portugal (AFP)	132
Switzerland (Schweizer Hitparade)	81
UK Singles (Official Charts)	96
US Billboard Hot 100	35
US Hot 100 Recurrents (Billboard)	2
US Adult Contemporary (Billboard) with Martina McBride	7
US Country Airplay (Billboard) with Martina McBride	36
US Holiday 100 (Billboard)	65
US Holiday 100 (Billboard) with Martina McBride	63
US Rolling Stone Top 100	21

=== Ray Charles and Betty Carter version ===
Chart (1962)	Peak position
US Billboard Hot 100	91

=== Tom Jones and Cerys Matthews version ===
Chart (1999)	Peak position
UK Singles (Official Charts)	17

=== Ella Fitzgerald and Louis Jordan version ===
Chart (2010–2012)	Peak position
US Jazz Digital Songs (Billboard)	2
US Holiday Digital Songs (Billboard)	11

=== Glee Cast version ===
Chart (2010–2012)	Peak position
Canada Hot 100 (Billboard)	53
Canada AC (Billboard)	33
US Billboard Hot 100	57
US Holiday Digital Songs (Billboard)	1

=== Willie Nelson and Norah Jones version ===
Chart (2010)	Peak position
US Hot Country Songs (Billboard)	55

=== She & Him version ===
Chart (2012)	Peak position
US Adult Contemporary (Billboard)	16
US Holiday Digital Songs (Billboard)	15

=== Lady Antebellum / Lady A version ===
Chart (2011–2012)	Peak position
US Bubbling Under Hot 100 (Billboard)	3
US Digital Song Sales (Billboard)	69
US Holiday 100 (Billboard)	26

=== Kelly Clarkson and Ronnie Dunn version ===
Chart (2013)	Peak position
South Korea International Singles (Gaon)	127
US Holiday Digital Songs (Billboard)	6

=== Idina Menzel and Michael Bublé version ===
Chart (2014–2025)	Peak position
Australia (ARIA)	51
Canada Hot 100 (Billboard)	58
Canada AC (Billboard)	1
Ireland (IRMA)	62
Netherlands (Single Tip)	7
UK Singles (Official Charts)	39
US Billboard Hot 100	78
US Adult Contemporary (Billboard)	1
US Holiday 100 (Billboard)	14

=== Seth Macfarlane feat. Sara Bareilles version ===
Chart (2015)	Peak position
Hungary (Stream Top 40)	27

=== Brett Eldredge and Meghan Trainor version ===
Chart (2016–2023)	Peak position
Belgium (Ultratip Bubbling Under Flanders)	46
Belgium (Ultratip Bubbling Under Wallonia)	46
Canada AC (Billboard)	15
Global 200 (Billboard)	138
Greece International (IFPI)	97
Hungary (Single Top 40)	40
Ireland (IRMA)	48
Latvia (LAIPA)	24
Lithuania (AGATA)	55
Netherlands (Single Top 100)	55
Poland (Polish Streaming Top 100)	90
Portugal (AFP)	54
Sweden (Sverigetopplistan)	93
Switzerland (Schweizer Hitparade)	53
UK Singles (Official Charts)	51
US Adult Contemporary (Billboard)	1
US Hot Country Songs (Billboard)	26
US Holiday 100 (Billboard)	67

=== John Legend and Kelly Clarkson version ===
Chart (2019–2020)	Peak position
Canada AC (Billboard)	25
New Zealand Hot Singles (RMNZ)	22
US Holiday Digital Songs (Billboard)	5
US R&B Digital Songs (Billboard)	6

=== Year-end charts ===
==== Idina Menzel and Michael Bublé version ====
Chart (2015)	Position
US Adult Contemporary (Billboard)	45

==== Brett Eldredge and Meghan Trainor version ====
Chart (2017)	Position
US Adult Contemporary (Billboard)	50

== Certifications ==
=== Dean Martin version ===
Region	Certification	Certified units/sales
United Kingdom (BPI)	Silver	200,000^{‡}
United States (RIAA)	2× Platinum	2,000,000^{‡}
^{‡} Sales+streaming figures based on certification alone.

=== Idina Menzel and Michael Bublé version ===
Region	Certification	Certified units/sales
New Zealand (RMNZ)	Gold	15,000^{‡}
United Kingdom (BPI)	Platinum	600,000^{‡}
^{‡} Sales+streaming figures based on certification alone.

=== Brett Eldredge and Meghan Trainor version ===
Region	Certification	Certified units/sales
United Kingdom (BPI)	Silver	200,000^{‡}
^{‡} Sales+streaming figures based on certification alone.

== See also ==
- List of Billboard Adult Contemporary number ones of 2014, 2015, and 2017 (U.S.)
