= Mort Dixon =

American lyricist (1892–1956)

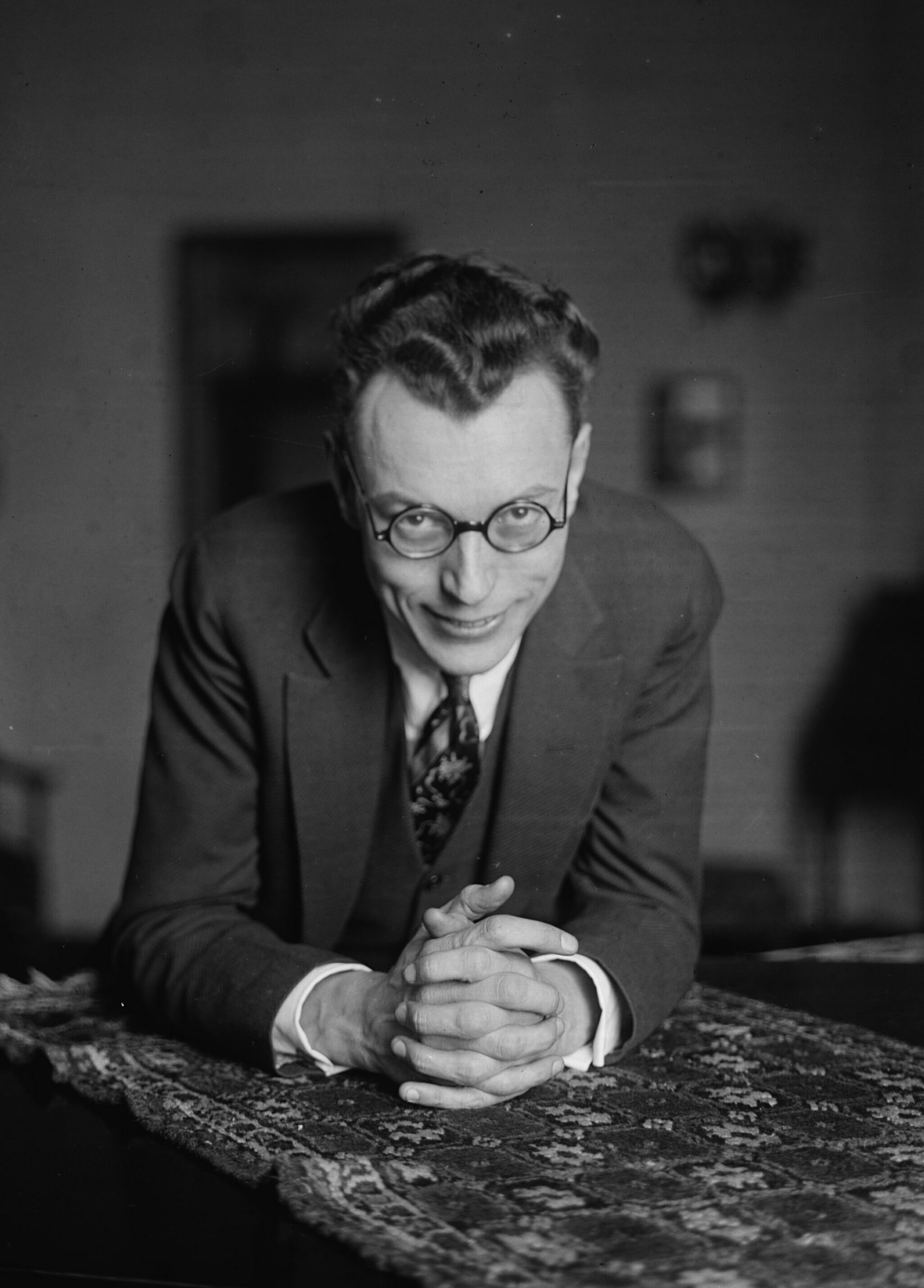
- Dixon in 1923

Background information
- Born: March 20, 1892; New York City, U.S.
- Died: March 23, 1956 (aged 64) Bronxville, New York, U.S.
- Occupation: Lyricist
- Years active: 1920s–1930s

Mort Dixon (March 20, 1892 – March 23, 1956) was an American lyricist.

== Biography ==
Born in New York City, United States, Dixon began writing songs in the early 1920s and was active into the 1930s. He achieved success with his first published effort, 1923's "That Old Gang of Mine". His chief composer collaborators were Ray Henderson, Harry Warren, Harry M. Woods, and Allie Wrubel.

His composing output declined in the late 1930s, and he retired early in life to reside in Westchester County, New York.

Among his lyrics are "That Old Gang of Mine" (1923), "Bye Bye Blackbird" (1926), "I'm Looking over a Four Leaf Clover" (1927), "Nagasaki" (1928), "Would You Like to Take a Walk?" (1930), "I Found a Million Dollar Baby (in a Five and Ten Cent Store)", "You're My Everything", "River, Stay 'Way from My Door" (1931), "Flirtation Walk", "Mr. and Mrs. is the Name" (1934), and "The Lady in Red" (1935).

Dixon is a member of the Songwriters Hall of Fame. He died in Bronxville, New York.
