= Classics (She & Him album) =

Studio album by She & Him
- Released: December 2, 2014
- Genres: Indie pop, jazz
- Length: 38:46
- Label: Columbia
- Producer: M. Ward

She & Him chronology
Volume 3 (2013)	Classics (2014)	Christmas Party (2016)

Classics is the fifth studio album by She & Him, a collaboration between M. Ward and actress Zooey Deschanel. It was released by Columbia Records on December 2, 2014. The album features 13 covers of classic songs, recorded live and accompanied by a 20-piece orchestra. Classics was released for a First Listen on NPR on November 23, 2014.

== Critical reception ==
Professional ratings
Aggregate scores
Source	Rating
Metacritic	67/100
Review scores
Source	Rating
The A.V. Club	C+
AllMusic	4/5 stars
American Songwriter	3/5 stars
Drowned in Sound	7/10
Exclaim!	6/10
NME	2.5/5 stars
Paste	7.0/10
Pitchfork	6.6/10
Rolling Stone	3/5 stars
Slant Magazine	3.5/5 stars

At Metacritic, which assigns a "weighted average" rating out of 100 to selected independent ratings and reviews from mainstream critics, the album has received a Metascore of 67, based on 16 reviews, indicating "generally favorable reviews".

Two publications, Alternative Press and Slant Magazine, awarded the album three and a half stars. Robert Ham for the former refers to "Deschanel is a delight, at times coy and romantic, and in other moments, moody and pensive", which Jeremy Winograd for the latter calls "Deschanel and Ward's versions are surprisingly engaging." In doling out a seven out of ten reviews on behalf of Paste and Drowned in Sound, Hilary Saunders for the former tells "Classics presents these songs faithfully and inoffensively, and She & Him cover them with the best of intentions", and Marc Burrows for the latter finds "it's a hard heart that dismisses a solid record of wonderful songs done well." Rating the album a 6.6 out of ten at Pitchfork, Hazel Cills tells "If Classics proves anything, it’s that these songs stick around for a reason." In rating the music four stars for AllMusic, Timothy Monger replies "Classics is meant to be pure entertainment and even though most of these songs have been sung before by a variety of other artists, in the hands of She & Him, it comes off less like a novelty and instead sits very comfortably in their growing catalog of fine releases."

Two publications conferred three star ratings upon the album, which were Rolling Stone and American Songwriter, for the former publication Jonathan Bernstein believes "The surprisingly loungy results are unusually daring for these two", which for the latter Hal Horowitz ascertains "Ultimately despite, or perhaps because of, its minor ambitions, Classics succeeds on its own terms." Annie Zaleski writing for The A.V. Club rated the album a C+, suggests "Yet for all of its impeccable arrangements, Classics almost feels too perfect, an album so stylized that it inadvertently suppresses the emotion inherent in these songs... Losing something in translation is the potential downside of interpreting beloved standards, and while She & Him are lovingly faithful performers, Classics ends up as just pleasant background music." In correspondingly granting the music here a six out of ten for Exclaim! and PopMatters, Alison Lang for the former says "As a result (maybe inevitably) any vestigial threads of quirkiness have fallen away; while Classics is a pleasant enough album, it will forever mark the moment when She & Him went full Starbucks... This is an album that's holiday-ready: safe, inoffensive, pretty grandma music", while for the latter Charles Pitter writes "All in all, Classics is charming enough to merit a release, and it would be unfair to claim that by putting out a covers album, She & Him are treading water. The album is classy and appealing, and although it’s not particularly challenging, it’s still a lot more than just background music... In a world where we’re constantly bombarded with dissonance and discord, Classics is a soothing remedy for agitated minds." Andy Welsh, reviewing for NME and awarding to the album a five out of ten, explains "But a whole album of Deschanel's wholesome, entertaining-the-troops voice and M Ward's tasteful instrumentation is cloying."

== Track listing ==
No.	Title	Writer(s)	Length
1.	"Stars Fell on Alabama"	Mitchell Parish, Frank Perkins	2:22
2.	"Oh No, Not My Baby"	Gerry Goffin, Carole King	3:21
3.	"It's Not for Me to Say"	Robert Allen, Al Stillman	3:15
4.	"Stay Awhile"	Mike Hawker, Ivor Raymonde	2:38
5.	"This Girl's in Love with You"	Burt Bacharach, Hal David	3:19
6.	"Time After Time"	Sammy Cahn, Jule Styne	3:22
7.	"She"	Charles Aznavour, Herbert Kretzmer	3:24
8.	"Teach Me Tonight"	Sammy Cahn, Gene de Paul	2:29
9.	"It's Always You"	Johnny Burke, Jimmy Van Heusen	3:06
10.	"Unchained Melody"	Alex North, Hy Zaret	3:51
11.	"I'll Never Be Free"	Bennie Benjamin, George David Weiss	3:23
12.	"Would You Like to Take a Walk?"	Mort Dixon, Billy Rose, Harry Warren	2:05
13.	"We'll Meet Again"	Hugh Charles, Ross Parker	2:32

== Personnel ==
- Zooey Deschanel – vocals, backing vocals, piano, Wurlitzer
- M. Ward – vocals, guitar
- Charlie Pillow – flute, oboe, sax (alto), backing vocals
- Doug Wieselman – clarinet, flute, sax (tenor), backing vocals
- Trombone Shorty – trombone
- Curtis Hasselbring – trombone
- Art Baron – trombone, backing vocals
- Steven Bernstein – trumpet, backing vocals
- Tyler Tornfelt – bass
- Tim Luntzel – bass
- Pierre de Reeder – bass, drums, engineer, percussion
- Jim Keltner – drums, percussion
- Boo Reiners – banjo
- Amanda Lawrence – viola
- Tom Hagerman – violin
- Nate Walcott – piano
- Chapin Sisters – vocals
- Bob Ludwig – mastering
- Larry Crane – mixing
- Tom Schick – engineer, mixing

== Charts ==
Chart performance for Classics
Chart (2014)	Peak position
Australian Albums (ARIA)	77
US Billboard 200	41
US Top Alternative Albums (Billboard)	4
US Americana/Folk Albums (Billboard)	1
US Top Rock Albums (Billboard)	7
US Indie Store Album Sales (Billboard)	4
