= I Thought I Saw Your Face Today =

2008 song by She & Him

Song by She & Him

from the album Volume One
- Released: March 18, 2008
- Recorded: December 2006–March 2007
- Genre: Indie pop
- Length: 2:50
- Label: Merge; Double Six
- Songwriter: Zooey Deschanel
- Producer: M. Ward

"I Thought I Saw Your Face Today" is a song by American musical duo She & Him from their debut studio album Volume One (2008). It is a wistful piano ballad that conveys lament following a breakup. The song experienced a resurgence in popularity after going viral on the video-sharing app TikTok in late 2025 and as a result became the duo's first song to enter the Billboard Hot 100, debuting at number 99. The lyric video for the song, which was directed by Clare Macdonald, was released on December 27, 2025.

== TikTok virality ==
In November–December 2025, the song (specifically the lines "I somehow see what's beautiful in things that are ephemeral") became widely used in video edits on TikTok, where users set it to clips of movies and TV shows, as well as nature, food and sports highlight montages. The trend led to the song gaining newfound success; according to Luminate, the song earned over 2.5 million official on-demand U.S. streams in the week ending on November 27, which increased to five million streams by the next two weeks.

== Charts ==
Chart performance for "I Thought I Saw Your Face Today"
Chart (2025–2026)	Peak position
Australia On Replay Singles (ARIA)	50
Canada (Canadian Hot 100)	37
Global 200 (Billboard)	35
India International (IMI)	10
Ireland (IRMA)	97
Lithuania (AGATA)	45
Netherlands (Single Tip)	3
Norway (IFPI Norge)	53
Philippines Hot 100 (Billboard Philippines)	24
Portugal (AFP)	164
Singapore (RIAS)	30
South Korea (Circle)	199
Sweden (Sverigetopplistan)	62
UK Singles (Official Charts)	97
UK Indie (Official Charts)	9
US Billboard Hot 100	40
US Hot Rock & Alternative Songs (Billboard)	5

== Certifications ==
Certifications for "I Thought I Saw Your Face Today"
Region	Certification	Certified units/sales
Canada (Music Canada)	Platinum	80,000^{‡}
New Zealand (RMNZ)	Gold	15,000^{‡}
United Kingdom (BPI)	Silver	200,000^{‡}
United States (RIAA)	Gold	500,000^{‡}
^{‡} Sales+streaming figures based on certification alone.
