= Volume One (She & Him album) =

Studio album by She & Him
- Released: March 18, 2008
- Recorded: December 2006, February–March 2007
- Genres: Indie pop, alternative country
- Length: 36:27
- Labels: Merge, Double Six
- Producer: M. Ward

She & Him chronology
Volume One (2008)	Volume Two (2010)

Singles from Volume One
- 1. "Why Do You Let Me Stay Here?" Released: November 17, 2008

Volume One is the first album by She & Him, a collaboration between M. Ward and singer/songwriter and actress Zooey Deschanel. It was released by Merge Records on March 18, 2008.

The album debuted at No. 81 on the Billboard charts in its first week, and climbed to No. 71 in its second week. It has received a strong response from critics, receiving a score of 76/100 on Metacritic, indicating overall positive reviews. It was also voted the No. 1 Album of 2008 by Paste. It came 30th in the 2008 Pazz and Jop poll. Volume One has sold over 300,000 copies to date in the US, according to Nielsen SoundScan.

The song "Why Do You Let Me Stay Here?" was No. 64 on Rolling Stone's list of the 100 Best Songs of 2008 and two different music videos of it were produced. The first video featured Zooey Deschanel and M. Ward in a semi-animated enactment released in 2008. The second video, released in 2009, was a collaboration of talent from the film (500) Days of Summer, including co-stars Zooey Deschanel and Joseph Gordon-Levitt with director Marc Webb, choreographer Michael Rooney, and producer Mason Novick.

== Critical reception ==
Professional ratings
Aggregate scores
Source	Rating
Metacritic	76/100
Review scores
Source	Rating
AllMusic	4/5 stars
The A.V. Club	A−
Drowned in Sound	8/10
NME	7/10
Pitchfork	7.4/10
Rolling Stone	3.5/5 stars
Silent Sound Waves	5/6 stars
Slant Magazine	3.5/5 stars
Spin	3.5/5 stars

Volume One received positive reviews, and landed on the Village Voice's 'Pazz and Jop' poll as one of the year's best albums and was named the best record of 2008 by Paste magazine. Patrick Caldwell of the Austin American Statesman wrote "The album gently rambled through 13 tracks of sun-dappled pop, with a gentle Orbisonian charm and sweet, wistful vocals from Deschanel."

=== Accolades ===
Accolades for Volume One
Publication	Country	Accolade	Year	Rank
Paste	US	Signs of Life 2008: Best Music	2008	1
WERS Boston	US	50 Best Albums of the Year	2008	5

== Track listing ==
All tracks are written by Zooey Deschanel, except where noted.

No.	Title	Length
1.	"Sentimental Heart"	2:36
2.	"Why Do You Let Me Stay Here?"	2:31
3.	"This Is Not a Test"	3:31
4.	"Change Is Hard"	3:03
5.	"I Thought I Saw Your Face Today"	2:50
6.	"Take It Back"	2:37
7.	"I Was Made for You"	2:31
8.	"You Really Got a Hold on Me" (William Robinson, Jr.)	3:59
9.	"Black Hole"	2:12
10.	"Got Me"	2:46
11.	"I Should Have Known Better" (Lennon–McCartney)	3:39
12.	"Sweet Darlin'" (Z. Deschanel/J. Schwartzman)	2:41
13.	"Swing Low, Sweet Chariot" (Traditional)	1:37

=== Singles ===
- "Why Do You Let Me Stay Here?" (January 2008)

== Personnel ==
=== Performance ===
She and Him

- Zooey Deschanel – songwriter, vocals, piano, keyboards (5, 6, 7, 10), percussion (1), xylophone (4)
- M. Ward – producer, guitar, vocals (4, 8, 11), keyboards (1, 10, 12), slide guitar (4, 9), bass (9)

Additional musicians

- Tom Hagerman – strings (1, 6)
- Mike Coykendall – engineering, mixing, bass, percussion (1, 2, 3, 4, 10, 11), guitar (3, 9), mouth bass (11)
- Mike Mogis – engineering, mixing, percussion (1, 12), steel guitar (4)
- Rachel Blumberg – percussion (5, 7, 9, 12)
- Peter Broderick – strings (5, 12)
- Adam Selzer – percussion (12)
- Paul Brainard – steel guitar (6, 11)

=== Production ===
- M. Ward – producer
- Adam Selzer – mixing, engineering
- Doug Van Sloun – mastering
- Maggie Fost – design

== Charts ==
Weekly chart performance for Volume One
Chart (2008)	Peak position
US Billboard 200	71
US Top Alternative Albums (Billboard)	18
US Independent Albums (Billboard)	8
US Indie Store Album Sales (Billboard)	4
