= Melt Away: A Tribute to Brian Wilson =

Studio album by She & Him
- Released: July 22, 2022
- Genre: Rock
- Length: 40:23
- Label: Fantasy

She & Him chronology
Christmas Party (2016)	Melt Away: A Tribute to Brian Wilson (2022)

Melt Away: A Tribute to Brian Wilson is the seventh studio album by American musical duo She & Him, a collaboration between Zooey Deschanel and M. Ward. The album was released by Fantasy Records on July 22, 2022. It is a tribute to Brian Wilson, co-founder of the Beach Boys, featuring covers of Beach Boys songs written by Wilson, in addition to featuring Brian Wilson on the track "Do It Again".

== Critical reception ==
Riff felt that the "album's 14 tracks find a sweet spot between the sunny, fun-fun-fun façade of Wilson's music and the anxieties and melancholy that anchor it", while American Songwriter reviewed that "it's an unorthodox tack for a tribute, but it's one that still resonates well."

== Track listing ==
No.	Title	Writer(s)	Length
1.	"Darlin'"	Brian Wilson, Mike Love	2:59
2.	"Wouldn't It Be Nice"	Wilson, Tony Asher, Love	2:58
3.	"'Til I Die"	Wilson	3:22
4.	"Deirdre"	Bruce Johnston, Wilson	3:21
5.	"Melt Away"	Wilson, ~~Eugene Landy~~	3:52
6.	"Good to My Baby"	Wilson, Love	1:52
7.	"Don't Talk (Put Your Head on My Shoulder)"	Wilson, Asher	3:32
8.	"Don't Worry Baby"	Wilson, Roger Christian	3:24
9.	"This Whole World"	Wilson	3:07
10.	"Kiss Me Baby"	Wilson, Love	2:50
11.	"Do It Again" (featuring Brian Wilson)	Wilson, Love	2:37
12.	"Heads You Win-Tails I Lose"	Wilson, Gary Usher	1:53
13.	"Please Let Me Wonder"	Wilson, Love	3:05
14.	"Meant for You"	Wilson, Love	1:31
Total length:			40:23

Eugene Landy's co-writing credit for "Melt Away", which has been disputed, was removed around 2000. For historical purposes, the songwriting credits for "Melt Away" are as they were originally credited, albeit with a strikethrough for credits that are no longer officially recognized (Landy's).

== Personnel ==
- Zooey Deschanel – Vocals and Vocal Arrangements
- M. Ward – Vocals, Guitars, Keys, Vocoder and Musical Arrangements
- Brian Wilson – Vocals on "Do It Again"
- Jose Medeles – Drums (except "Wouldn't It Be Nice") and Percussion
- Danny Frankel – Drums on "Wouldn't It Be Nice"
- John Perrin – Drums on "Do It Again"
- Joey Spampinato – Bass
- Paul Brainard – Pedal Steel and Trumpet
- Mark Powers – Percussion

== Charts ==
Chart performance for Melt Away: A Tribute to Brian Wilson
Chart (2022)	Peak position
Scottish Albums (OCC)	33
