= Christmas Party (She & Him album) =

Studio album by She & Him
- Released: October 28, 2016
- Genre: Indie pop, Christmas
- Length: 32:04
- Label: Columbia
- Producer: M. Ward

She & Him chronology
Classics (2014)	Christmas Party (2016)	Melt Away: A Tribute to Brian Wilson (2022)

Professional ratings
Aggregate scores
Source	Rating
Metacritic	68/100
Review scores
Source	Rating
Los Angeles Times	3/5 stars
The Independent	3/5 stars
PopMatters	6/10

Christmas Party is the second Christmas album and the sixth studio album by the folk/indie rock band She & Him, consisting of actress and musician Zooey Deschanel and musician M. Ward. The album was released on October 28, 2016, and features several covers of classic holiday songs.

At Metacritic, which assigns a normalized rating out of 100 to reviews from mainstream critics, the album received a score of 68, based on 16 critics, indicating "generally favorable" reviews.

The song "Must Be Santa" includes a lyrical interpolated list of Santa's reindeer and American presidents including, anachronistically, Hillary Clinton, who was not elected president eleven days after the album's release.

== Track listing ==
No.	Title	Writer(s)	Length
1.	"All I Want for Christmas Is You"	Mariah Carey, Walter Afanasieff	4:18
2.	"Let It Snow"	Jule Styne, Sammy Cahn	2:12
3.	"Must Be Santa"	Hal Moore, Bill Fredericks	2:16
4.	"Happy Holiday"	Irving Berlin	2:12
5.	"Mele Kalikimaka"	Robert Alexander Anderson	2:43
6.	"Christmas Memories"	Alan Bergman, Marilyn Bergman, Domenick Costa	2:50
7.	"Run Run Rudolph"	Johnny Marks, Marvin Brodie	2:52
8.	"Winter Wonderland"	Richard B. Smith, Felix Bernard	2:37
9.	"The Coldest Night of the Year"	Barry Mann, Cynthia Weil	3:34
10.	"A Marshmallow World"	Carl Sigman, Peter DeRose	1:56
11.	"The Man with the Bag"	Dudley Brooks, Hal Stanley, Irving Taylor	2:06
12.	"Christmas Don't Be Late"	Ross Bagdasarian	2:26
Total length:			32:04

== Charts ==
Chart performance for Christmas Party
Chart (2016)	Peak position
US Americana/Folk Albums (Billboard)	5
US Top Alternative Albums (Billboard)	14
US Top Holiday Albums (Billboard)	15
US Top Rock Albums (Billboard)	23
US Indie Store Album Sales (Billboard)	12
