= Volume Two (She & Him album) =

Studio album by She & Him
- Released: March 17, 2010
- Recorded: 2008–2009
- Genres: Indie pop; alternative country
- Length: 43:16
- Labels: P-Vine; Merge; Double Six
- Producer: M. Ward

She & Him chronology
Volume One (2008)	Volume Two (2010)	A Very She & Him Christmas (2011)

Volume Two is the second studio album by She & Him, a collaboration between M. Ward and singer/songwriter and actress Zooey Deschanel. It was released on March 17, 2010 through P-Vine Records in Japan, in the United States on March 23, 2010 through Merge Records, and on April 5, 2010 on Double Six Records in the UK.

The album's track listing was announced on December 8, 2009. "In the Sun" was published online by Pitchfork on January 22, 2010 and was released as a single with "I Can Hear Music" on February 23, 2010. A video of "In the Sun" was released on March 9, 2010.

On February 9, 2010, She & Him were interviewed on BBC 6 Music and performed "Thieves" and "Gonna Get Along without You Now" from the not-yet-released album. Two versions of the song "Thieves" were made available on-line. One was that played for the BBC interview and two weeks later Stereogum premiered the studio version from the album. A video of "Thieves" was released on July 9, 2010.

On March 14, 2010, the entire album became available for streaming on NPR's website. The album debuted at number six on the Billboard 200 chart.

== Critical reception ==
Professional ratings
Aggregate scores
Source	Rating
Metacritic	73/100
Review scores
Source	Rating
AllMusic	4/5 stars
American Music Channel	4/5 stars
The A.V. Club	B+
Entertainment Weekly	B+
Filter	86%
MusicOMH	4.5/5 stars
Pitchfork	7.6/10
Rolling Stone	3.5/5 stars
Spin	2.5/5 stars

The album received positive reviews. Reviewing the album for NPR First Listen, Stephen Thompson wrote, "[Volume Two] isn't exactly dragging listeners through a complex emotional hellride. It's more confection than confessional, but it's a kind-natured one; the audio equivalent of a spring breeze that wafts in at a perfect time."

Rob Dixon commented on inthenews.co.uk, "For a partnership which many may not see as the most obvious, it works brilliantly well. Over the course of the 13 tracks there are a number of gems, while all of the songs are expertly crafted by Deschanel and effortlessly captured by Ward...The covers are also dealt with expertly and fit the overall mood of the album, which has a glistening summery – and occasionally jaunty – feel to it. The sweetness might not be to everyone's taste though, particularly as on initial listens some tracks can appear somewhat samey."

Melissa Maerz wrote in Spin, "fans of '70s AM Gold will sip this stuff down like so much well-aged chardonnay. Buffeted by Ward's pillowy acoustic strums, Deschanel is a convincing soft-rock goddess, conjuring Linda Ronstadt on the country shuffle 'Thieves' and Skeeter Davis on a cover of 'Gonna Get Along Without Ya Now'. She lays down the lullaby 'If You Can't Sleep' with a voice as clear and rosy as stained glass."

== Singles ==
- "In The Sun" (February 23, 2010)
- "Thieves" (June 14, 2010)
- "I Put a Spell on You" (Screamin' Jay Hawkins) / "Lingering Still" (December 7, 2010)

== Track listing ==
All songs written by Zooey Deschanel, except where noted.

1. "Thieves" – 4:08
2. "In the Sun" – 2:51
3. "Don't Look Back" – 3:23
4. "Ridin' in My Car" (Alan G. Anderson) – 3:15
5. "Lingering Still" – 3:02
6. "Me and You" – 3:20
7. "Gonna Get Along Without You Now" (Milton Kellem) – 2:32
8. "Home" – 4:41
9. "I'm Gonna Make It Better" – 3:32
10. "Sing" – 3:14
11. "Over It Over Again" – 3:30
12. "Brand New Shoes" – 3:05
13. "If You Can't Sleep" – 2:49

=== Bonus tracks ===
- "I Knew It Would Happen This Way" – iTunes pre-order
- "I Can Hear Music" (Jeff Barry, Ellie Greenwich, Phil Spector) – Brazilian release

== Personnel ==
=== Performance ===
She and Him

- Zooey Deschanel – lead vocals, piano, lyrics
- M. Ward – guitar, vocals, mandolin, vibes, synthesizer, producer, piano on "I'm Gonna Make It Better"

Additional musicians

- Mike Coykendall – bass guitar, backing vocals on "Sing", acoustic guitar on "Lingering Still"
- Scott McPherson – drums, percussion
- Mike Mogis – percussion, synthesizer, mandolin on "Lingering Still"
- Paul Brainard – pedal steel guitar on "You and Me"
- Tom Hagerman – strings
- Peter Broderick – strings
- Amanda Lawrence – strings
- Tilly and the Wall – backing vocals on "In the Sun"
- Jason Schwartzman – bass line ideas on "Lingering Still"

=== Production ===
- Mike Coykendall – engineering, mixing
- Mike Mogis – engineering, mixing
- Kendra Lynn – additional engineering
- Bob Ludwig – mastering
- Kate Quinby – artwork

== Charts ==
Chart performance for Volume Two
Chart (2010)	Peak position
Australian Albums (ARIA)	49
Belgian Albums (Ultratop Flanders)	67
French Albums (SNEP)	104
Irish Independent Albums Chart	1
Spanish Albums (Promusicae)	87
Swedish Albums (Sverigetopplistan)	28
UK Albums (OCC)	62
US Billboard 200	6
US Top Alternative Albums (Billboard)	1
US Americana/Folk Albums (Billboard)	1
US Independent Albums (Billboard)	1
US Top Rock Albums (Billboard)	1
US Indie Store Album Sales (Billboard)	1

== Release history ==
Release history for Volume Two
Region	Date	Label	Format	Catalogue #	Ref.
Japan	March 17, 2010	P-Vine	CD digipak	PCD-93325	
United States	March 23, 2010	Merge	CD, digital download, vinyl LP	50354	
United Kingdom	April 5, 2010	Double Six	CD, digital download	DS024CD	
