= A Very She & Him Christmas =

Studio album by She & Him
- Released: October 24, 2011
- Recorded: 2011
- Studio: Kingsize Soundlabs, Los Angeles, California; Magic Shop, New York City, New York
- Genre: Indie pop, Christmas
- Length: 32:05
- Label: Merge
- Producer: M. Ward

She & Him chronology
Volume Two (2010)	A Very She & Him Christmas (2011)	Volume 3 (2013)

Professional ratings
Aggregate scores
Source	Rating
Metacritic	63/100
Review scores
Source	Rating
Entertainment Weekly	B
NME	1/5 stars
Pitchfork	5.3/10
PopMatters	7/10 stars
Under the Radar	5/10 stars

A Very She & Him Christmas is the first Christmas album and the third studio album by the folk/indie rock band She & Him, consisting of actress and musician Zooey Deschanel and musician M. Ward. The album was released on October 24, 2011, and features several covers of classic holiday songs. The twelve-track album is distributed by Merge Records and proceeds from every album sold are being donated to 826 National, a nonprofit network of writing and tutoring centers.

Their cover of "I'll Be Home for Christmas" was featured in the Christmas episode "The 23rd" of the TV-show New Girl, which stars Zooey Deschanel.

In 2012 it was awarded a silver certification from the Independent Music Companies Association which indicated sales of at least 20,000 copies throughout Europe and over 391,000 in the U.S.

== Reception ==
At Metacritic, which assigns a normalized rating out of 100 to reviews from mainstream critics, the album received a score of 63, based on 16 critics, indicating "generally favorable" reviews.

PopMatters gave the album a score of 7/10, writing that it was "plain beautiful" and that it was "a calm, simple and easy to listen to recording to sit with and relax." A more mixed review from Pitchfork said that the songs were "just fine" but that She & Him "played this one too safe."

== Track listing ==
A Very She & Him Christmas track listing
No.	Title	Writer(s)	Length
1.	"The Christmas Waltz"	Sammy Cahn, Jule Styne	2:37
2.	"Christmas Day"	Brian Wilson	3:24
3.	"Have Yourself a Merry Little Christmas"	Ralph Blane, Hugh Martin	3:42
4.	"I'll Be Home for Christmas"	Walter Kent, Kim Gannon, Buck Ram	2:26
5.	"Christmas Wish"	Joey Spampinato	2:58
6.	"Sleigh Ride"	Leroy Anderson, Mitchell Parish	2:44
7.	"Rockin' Around the Christmas Tree"	Johnny Marks	2:00
8.	"Silver Bells"	Jay Livingston, Ray Evans	1:57
9.	"Baby, It's Cold Outside"	Frank Loesser	2:17
10.	"Blue Christmas"	Billy Hayes, Jay W. Johnson	3:24
11.	"Little Saint Nick"	Wilson, Mike Love	2:10
12.	"The Christmas Song"	Bob Wells, Mel Tormé	2:26

A Very She & Him Christmas – Limited 10th anniversary deluxe edition (bonus 7-inch vinyl)
No.	Title	Writer(s)	Length
1.	"Holiday"	Curtis Hudson; Lisa Stevens	3:58
2.	"Last Christmas"	George Michael	4:08

A Very She & Him Christmas – Limited 10th anniversary deluxe edition (digital bonus track)
No.	Title	Writer(s)	Length
1.	"It's Beginning to Look a Lot Like Christmas"	Meredith Willson	2:29

== Personnel ==
She & Him

- Zooey Deschanel – vocals, piano, ukulele
- M. Ward – vocals, guitar, organ

Additional personnel

- Jim Keltner – percussion
- Pierre de Reeder – engineer, percussion on "I'll Be Home for Christmas" and "Rockin' Around the Christmas Tree"
- Mike Post – assistant engineer

== Charts ==
=== Weekly charts ===
Weekly chart performance for A Very She & Him Christmas
Chart (2011)	Peak position
Australian Albums (ARIA)	91
US Billboard 200	12
US Top Alternative Albums (Billboard)	2
US Folk Albums (Billboard)	1
US Top Holiday Albums (Billboard)	2
US Independent Albums (Billboard)	1
US Top Rock Albums (Billboard)	3
US Top Tastemaker Albums (Billboard)	4

=== Year-end charts ===
Year-end chart performance for A Very She & Him Christmas
Chart (2012)	Position
US Billboard 200	119
US Top Rock Albums (Billboard)	32
