= Volume 3 (She & Him album) =

Studio album by She & Him
- Released: May 7, 2013
- Length: 42:34
- Labels: Merge (US); Double Six (UK)
- Producer: M. Ward

She & Him chronology
A Very She & Him Christmas (2011)	Volume 3 (2013)	Classics (2014)

Volume 3 is the fourth studio album by She & Him, a collaboration between M. Ward and actress Zooey Deschanel. It was released by Merge Records on May 7, 2013, in the United States and on May 13, 2013, by Double Six Records in the United Kingdom. On the album, there are eleven songs written by Deschanel and three cover songs.

On March 7, 2013, the song "Never Wanted Your Love" was released as a single. On April 10, 2013, the song "I Could've Been Your Girl" was released for streaming via SoundCloud.

Professional ratings
Aggregate scores
Source	Rating
Metacritic	67/100
Review scores
Source	Rating
AllMusic	4/5 stars
Consequence of Sound	3.5/5 stars
Pitchfork	7.5/10
Sputnikmusic	2.4/5
Under the Gun Review	6/10

== Critical reception ==
Upon release, Volume 3 received positive reviews from music critics. At Metacritic, which assigned a normalized rating out of 100 based on reviews from mainstream publications, the album has a score of 67 out of 100, indicating generally favorable reviews (based on 29 reviews). Gregory Heaney of Allmusic praised She and Him's "sunny, lovestruck sounds." Magnet stated that the album is "instantly likeable," and Dale Eisinger of Consequence of Sound commented that the album contains many "effortless and fully realized songs." However, while Rudy K. of Sputnikmusic praised, "the simplicity of the songs and the everyday romance they conjure," he also noted that at times the album "feels rote, a meticulous tastefulness that is pretty and nostalgic, yet largely uninteresting."

== Commercial performance ==
Volume 3 debuted at number 15 on the Billboard 200, with first-week sales of 26,000 copies in the United States.

== Track listing ==
All tracks are written by Zooey Deschanel, except where noted.

Volume 3 track listing
No.	Title	Length
1.	"I've Got Your Number, Son"	3:07
2.	"Never Wanted Your Love"	3:13
3.	"Baby" (George Morton, Jeff Barry, Ellie Greenwich)	3:15
4.	"I Could've Been Your Girl"	3:11
5.	"Turn to White"	4:22
6.	"Somebody Sweet to Talk To"	3:02
7.	"Something's Haunting You"	2:52
8.	"Together"	4:06
9.	"Hold Me, Thrill Me, Kiss Me" (Harry Noble)	2:44
10.	"Snow Queen"	2:32
11.	"Sunday Girl" (Chris Stein)	3:04
12.	"London"	2:28
13.	"Shadow of Love"	2:42
14.	"Reprise (I Could've Been Your Girl)"	1:49

== Personnel ==
She & Him

- Zooey Deschanel – lead and harmony vocals, percussion (1, 2, 6, 8), keyboards (1, 4, 8), piano (6, 12, 13), tambourine (3), vibraphone (7), taropatch ukulele (5)
- M. Ward – guitars, backing vocals (2, 5, 7, 13), lead vocals (3), piano (1, 3), organ (4, 11), percussion (2), horn arrangement

Additional musicians

- Scott McPherson – drums
- Joey Spampinato, Tyler Tornfelt, Mike Watt, Pierre de Reeder – bass
- Tom Hagerman – violin
- Amanda Lawrence – viola
- Tilly and the Wall – gang vocals

Horn section on "Together" and "Snow Queen"

- Art Baron – trombone
- C. J. Camerieri – trumpet
- Doug Wieselman – saxophone

== Charts ==
Chart performance for Volume 3
Chart (2013)	Peak position
Australian Albums (ARIA)	53
Belgian Albums (Ultratop Flanders)	101
Canadian Albums (Billboard)	18
Spanish Albums (Promusicae)	94
Swedish Albums (Sverigetopplistan)	37
UK Albums (OCC)	63
US Billboard 200	15
US Top Alternative Albums (Billboard)	3
US Americana/Folk Albums (Billboard)	1
US Independent Albums (Billboard)	2
US Top Rock Albums (Billboard)	3
US Indie Store Album Sales (Billboard)	1
