= She & Him =

American musical duo

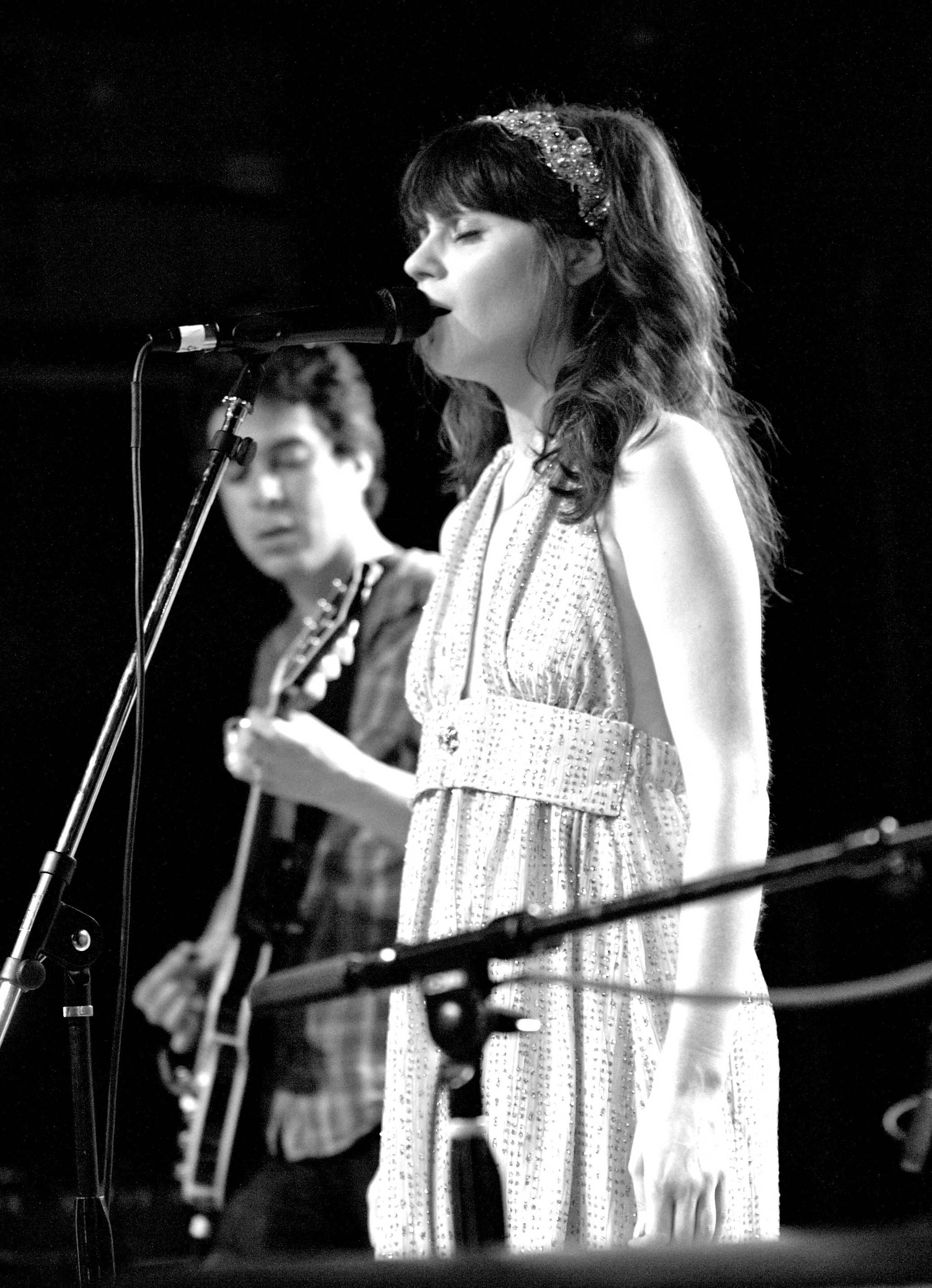
- She & Him at The Mercy Lounge in Nashville, 31 July 2008

Background information
- Origin: Portland, Oregon, U.S.
- Genres: Indie pop; alternative country; indie folk
- Years active: 2008–present
- Labels: Merge; Double Six; Columbia; Fantasy
- Members: Zooey Deschanel; M. Ward
- Website: www.sheandhim.com

She & Him is an American musical duo consisting of Zooey Deschanel (vocals, piano, ukulele) and M. Ward (guitar, production). It was formed in 2008 in Portland, Oregon. Their first album, Volume One, was released on the independent label Merge Records on March 18, 2008. They are commonly associated with the indie-folk resurgence of the mid-2000s, which music critic and professor Eric Harvey described in Stereogum as "childlike, whimsical, earnest, acoustic Starbucks-friendly music like Feist, the Decemberists, Regina Spektor, and Jose Gonzalez."

== History ==
=== Formation ===
Deschanel and Ward met on the set of the film The Go-Getter, in which Deschanel had a starring role. Martin Hynes, the director, introduced them to each other and asked them to sing a duet for the film's end credits. They performed the song "When I Get to the Border" by Richard and Linda Thompson. The two bonded over a shared interest in albums produced by George Martin and Phil Spector, as well as certain Ralph Peer groups such as the Carter Family.

Ward heard Deschanel sing in the film Elf. He was surprised to learn that, although she wrote songs, she had not pursued a career in music. Deschanel commented in an interview with Venus Zine: "I always thought I would be able to sing and act; but, at a certain point, it became difficult for me to share the music part. So I was writing a ton of music, but not really doing anything with it. I didn't really know exactly who to collaborate with until I met Matt, and everything seemed to fall into place.” Deschanel had done years' worth of home demos, but she was shy about becoming a big-name celebrity. On a whim, she sent them to Ward. Ward called her a short time later telling her that he would like to record her songs properly. Deschanel said in an interview: "I always have loved music, ever since I was really little. I just loved to sing."

=== 2006–2008: Collaboration and Volume One ===
For Volume One, the pair collaborated via e-mail, with Ward working in his studio in Portland, Oregon, and Deschanel in her home in Los Angeles, California. Los Angeles influenced Deschanel's songwriting, evoking long drives along the coast while listening to Brian Wilson, golden oldies, and jam music on 1970s AM radio. The California music scene influenced Ward's production of the album and inspired his guitar work with alt-country singers like Jenny Lewis.

Ward and Deschanel recorded in Portland, Oregon, in December 2006 and February to March 2007. Volume One was completed in three sessions. They also recorded in Mike Coykendall's and Adam Selzer's studios and had a mixing session with Mike Mogis in his Omaha, Nebraska studio in either April or May 2007. Deschanel wrote all the original songs on the album except "Sweet Darlin'", which she co-wrote with Jason Schwartzman (an actor known for his frequent collaborations with Wes Anderson). In addition to the ten original songs, the album features two cover songs: "You Really Got a Hold on Me" (composed by Smokey Robinson) and "I Should Have Known Better" (composed by John Lennon and Paul McCartney).

They took a break after that, as Ward was on tour and Deschanel was filming a movie. Volume One was released on March 18, 2008. Their first public appearance as a band was a year and two months earlier at the Sundance screening of The Go-Getter. They performed at other events and began their first tour in summer 2008. Paste named She & Him's debut the No. 1 album of the year.

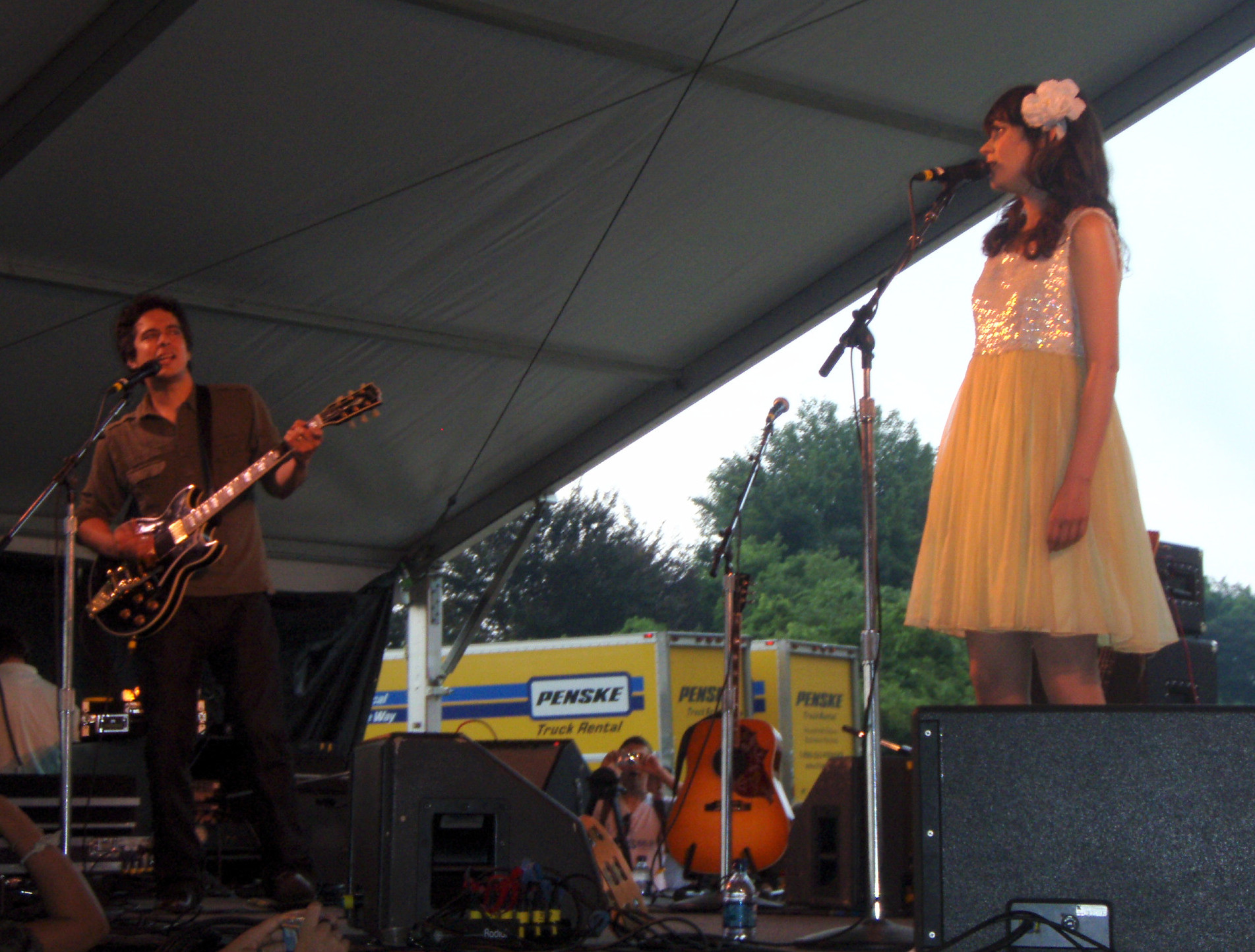
She & Him performing at the Newport Folk Festival (2 August 2008)

She & Him performed at the South by Southwest festival in March 2008 and went on tour during July and August 2008. Becky Stark of the band Lavender Diamond provided backup vocals.

=== 2010: Volume Two ===
On March 17, 2010, She & Him released their second album, Volume Two. The album features eleven original songs written by Deschanel and covers of NRBQ's 1977 single "Ridin' in My Car" and Patience and Prudence's "Gonna Get Along Without You Now", as well as a guest appearance from the indie pop group Tilly and the Wall on the track "In the Sun".

They performed concerts throughout the United States including the music festivals South by Southwest, Coachella, Bonnaroo, Savannah, Sasquatch, Nateva, Verge and the inaugural LouFest in St. Louis, Missouri, headlining with the likes of Broken Social Scene, Jeff Tweedy and Built to Spill. They also toured Europe, visiting London, Madrid, Barcelona, Paris, Berlin, Copenhagen, Stockholm, Oslo, and Amsterdam. They were chosen by Matt Groening to perform at All Tomorrow's Parties music festival in England.

=== 2011–2013: A Very She & Him Christmas and Volume 3 ===
A Very She & Him Christmas was announced on Pitchfork.com in September 2011. The twelve track Christmas album was released October 24, 2011, under Merge Records. Amazon.com said on December 29, 2011, that the album was one of its top three best-selling MP3-albums over the Christmas period.

Deschanel confirmed on Twitter that a new album would be released in early 2013. Volume 3 was subsequently announced, with a release date of May 7, 2013 (May 13, 2013 , for Europe). She & Him toured the US and Canada in support of Volume 3 in the summer of 2013. Supporting acts along the tour included Tilly and the Wall, Camera Obscura, Emmylou Harris, Rodney Crowell and The Chapin Sisters.

=== 2014–present: Record label change and Classics ===
On June 27, 2014, it was announced that She & Him had left independent label Merge Records and had joined major label Columbia Records, with their fifth studio album, Classics, scheduled to be released later in the year. The next month, Deschanel and Ward were photographed with Brian Wilson in the studio recording his forthcoming album No Pier Pressure which features Deschanel as a guest vocalist on the cha-cha-esque track "On the Island". On September 15, 2016, She & Him announced the forthcoming release of their second holiday album, Christmas Party, in October of that year. On July 22, 2022, She & Him released Melt Away: A Tribute to Brian Wilson.

The group's song "I Thought I Saw Your Face Today" experienced a resurgence in popularity after going viral on the video-sharing app TikTok in late 2025 and as a result became the duo's first song to enter the Billboard Hot 100, debuting at number 99.

In May 2026, the duo announced the "Pump Up The Volumes Tour" which they play songs from their albums Volume 1, 2 and 3 across the United States, including cities like New York and Los Angeles.

== Awards and honors ==
- Grammy Award nomination: Best Song Written for Visual Media for "So Long" in Winnie the Pooh (2012)

== Members ==
- Zooey Deschanel – lead vocals, tambourine, piano, ukulele
- M. Ward – guitar, backing vocals, piano, production

== Discography ==
- Volume One (2008)
- Volume Two (2010)
- A Very She & Him Christmas (2011)
- Volume 3 (2013)
- Classics (2014)
- Christmas Party (2016)
- Melt Away: A Tribute to Brian Wilson (2022)
