= List of abandoned and unfinished films =

Films may not be completed for several reasons, with some being shelved during different stages of the production. Some films have been shut down days into production. Other unfinished films have been shot in their entirety but have not completed post-production where the film is edited and sound and score added. Unfinished films are distinguished from unreleased films which are finished but have not yet been released and shown in theatres or released on DVD. In some instances these films cannot be shown for legal reasons. Withdrawn films are similar except they did have brief showings but cannot be shown again, also usually for legal reasons.

According to the Film Yearbook, "history has shown that the unfinished film is with few exceptions designed to remain that way." Exceptions do exist: these include Gulliver's Travels and The Jigsaw Man, both of which shut down when they ran out of funds but after a year or more found new financing and were able to finish shooting.

== Films abandoned during pre-production ==
Films that were abandoned during the pre-production stage before principal photography began, and significant preparations had been made such as a completed script, hiring of key cast and crew, scheduled start date for filming, and construction of sets and in the case of animated films at the animation production stage.

Year production was to begin	Film	Director	Screenwriter	Producer	Cast	Notes	References
1939	Iwonka	Konrad Tom	Konrad Tom	Albert Wywerka	Elżbieta Barszczewska, Igo Sym, Jerzy Kaliszewski, Wiktor Biegański, Stanisław Grolicki, Stefan Hnydziński	A drama film based on the novel by Juliusz German, production of which was planned to begin in 1940. Work on the film was interrupted by the German invasion of Poland, which began World War II.	
1939	Kwiaciarka	Konrad Tom	B. Jotkan		Barbara Kostrzewska, Jerzy Pichelski, Igo Sym	A feature film with elements of a musical, production of which was planned to begin in 1940. Work on the film was interrupted by the German invasion of Poland, which began World War II.	
1954	Finian's Rainbow	John Hubley			Frank Sinatra, Ella Fitzgerald, Oscar Peterson, Louis Armstrong, Barry Fitzgerald, Jim Backus, David Burns, David Wayne, Ella Logan	An animated film based on the Broadway play of the same title. The film ran into difficulty due to Hubley and Harburg's refusal to testify before the House Committee on Un-American Activities as a result of which work on the film was abandoned.	
1966–1975	The Freak	Charlie Chaplin			Victoria Chaplin	The Freak was a dramatic comedy from Charles Chaplin. The story revolved around a young South American girl who unexpectedly sprouts a pair of wings. She is kidnapped and taken to London, where her captors cash in by passing her off as an angel. Later she escapes, only to be arrested because of her appearance. She is further dehumanized by standing trial to determine if she is human at all. Chaplin began work in and around 1969 with his daughter Victoria in mind for the lead role. However, Victoria's abrupt marriage and his advanced age proved roadblocks, and the film was never made.	
1966–1968	Nasz Człowiek w Warszawie		Stanisław Bareja, Jacek Fedorowicz	Zespół Filmowy Rytm	Bohdan Łazuka	In 1966, Stanisław Bareja and Jacek Fedorowicz, inspired by James Bond films, began working on a script for a spy film about an atomic bomb dropped into the Zegrze Reservoir. Meanwhile, American agents arrived in Warsaw. The script was completed in 1967, and the film was to be produced by the Zespół Filmowy Rytm. Due to political reorganization and the dissolution of the Komisja Ocen Scenariuszy, the film lost support from the film community. The studio Zespół Filmowy Rytm was disbanded following the events of March 1968.	
1966–1999	Przedwiośnie	Andrzej Wajda	Andrzej Wajda			As early as 1956, director Andrzej Wajda planned to create a film adaptation of Stefan Żeromski's The Spring to Come, intended to stimulate discussion about the identity of the Polish nation. Several script versions were created in 1966, 1978, 1991, 1997, and 1999. However, the first version of the 1966 script was not released due to censorship, and in subsequent years, production was hampered by Wajda's work on Man of Iron in 1981 and Pierścionek z orłem w koronie in 1991. Ultimately, Wajda's project was not realized, and in 2000, production began on an adaptation (The Spring to Come (film)), directed by Filip Bajon without Andrzej Wajda's participation, which premiered on March 2, 2001.	
c. 1967	Frenzy (a.k.a. Kaleidoscope)	Alfred Hitchcock	Benn Levy	Alfred Hitchcock		Considerable test footage was shot. Not to be confused with Hitchcock's 1972 film Frenzy.	
1968–1970	Napoleon	Stanley Kubrick	Stanley Kubrick		Jack Nicholson	Kubrick's film about Napoleon was well into preproduction and ready to begin filming in 1970 when MGM cancelled the project. Numerous reasons have been cited for the abandonment of the project, including its projected cost and a change of ownership at MGM.	
1970	The Dancer	Tony Richardson	Edward Albee	Harry Saltzman	Rudolf Nureyev as Nijinsky, Claude Jade as Romola and Paul Scofield as Diaghilev	Producer Harry Saltzman canceled the project during pre-production several weeks before shooting was to begin. Saltzman claimed Albee's script was amateurish. Tony Richardson believes Saltzman used this as a pretext to avoid making the film. According to Richardson, Saltzman had overextended himself and did not have the funds to make the film. Saltzman eventually made the film in 1980 as Nijinsky, directed by Herbert Ross.	
1972	The Streets of Laredo	Peter Bogdanovich	Larry McMurtry, Peter Bogdanovich	Peter Bogdanovich	John Wayne, James Stewart, Henry Fonda, Ryan O'Neal, Cybill Shepherd, Ben Johnson, Cloris Leachman, Ellen Burstyn, The Clancy Brothers	After directing What's Up, Doc?, Peter Bogdanovich landed a three-picture deal at Warner Bros., the first of which was to be Western called The Streets of Laredo, set just after the American Civil War. Bogdanovich envisioned the film as a "summation of the Western", assembling an all-star cast of iconic Western stars which included primarily John Wayne, James Stewart and Henry Fonda. Fonda accepted the role, as did Stewart, though reluctantly. Wayne, however, declined (under the urgence of director John Ford who was on his death bed at the time), believing the film to be too much of a coda to Westerns. Since the film was keyed off those three actors, Bogdanovich decided not to move forward with it. McMurtry later bought the rights back and adapted their script into a Pulitzer Prize-winning novel which he called Lonesome Dove.	
1973–1978	The Many Faces of Jesus	Jens Jørgen Thorsen	Jens Jørgen Thorsen	Various, including David Grant		A pornographic film depicting Jesus engaged in sex acts with men and women. The premise caused controversy in every country where production was attempted. The effort was condemned by both Pope Paul VI and Queen Elizabeth II. After failing to secure funding in multiple countries, bans on production in at least two, and a personal ban from entering the United Kingdom, Thorsen abandoned the effort. The saga led to the gay Jesus film hoax (not to be confused with Him, a 1974 gay porn film involving Jesus sometimes claimed to be a hoax). Thorsen later produced The Return, a non-pornographic film about Jesus.	
1973–1997	The Prometheus Crisis/Meltdown	John Dahl (1994)	John Carpenter from the novel by Frank M. Robinson and Thomas N. Scortia	Peter Bart and Max Palevsky (1970s)	Dolph Lundgren (1994); Casper Van Dien (1997)	Originally planned as a disaster film about a meltdown at a newly built nuclear power station based on a novel by two of the authors responsible for The Towering Inferno for release by Paramount. John Carpenter's script, retitled Meltdown, was a straight horror film he described as "kind of Halloween in a nuclear power plant." Carpenter's script came close to production in 1994 with Dolph Lundgren starring, and again in 1997 with Casper Van Dien, but fell through both times.	
1973–1986	The Yellow Jersey	Michael Cimino (1975–1984); Jerry Schatzberg (1986)	Colin Welland, Carl Foreman, Lawrence Konner	Gary Mehlman, Carl Foreman	Dustin Hoffman (1983–1986); Christopher Lambert (1986)	The rights to Ralph Hurne's novel The Yellow Jersey were optioned in 1973 by producer Gary Mehlman, who then made a development deal with Columbia Pictures. The novel, set during the Tour de France, followed an aging professional cyclist who nearly wins the race. By 1975, Mehlman broad aboard Michael Cimino to direct the film. Over the next several years, the film generated expenses of nearly $2 million, and was in development with four studios and several independent production companies. Shooting during the Tour was initially scheduled for 1980, even though the film had no star. In 1983, when Dustin Hoffman indicated an interest in starring in it, production was imminent for 1984. However, Hoffman fired Cimino due to his uncompromising way of working. Hoffman too left the project, unsatisfied with the other replacements. Jerry Schatzberg was then brought aboard to direct, but no other actors accepted the lead role.	
1974–1976	Dune	Alejandro Jodorowsky	Alejandro Jodorowsky	Michel Seydoux	David Carradine, Geraldine Chaplin, Orson Welles, Salvador Dalí, Amanda Lear, Gloria Swanson, Mick Jagger, Brontis Jodorowsky	Jodorowsky spent two years developing a film version of Frank Herbert's novel Dune. Actors approached or cast in the film include David Carradine as Leto Atreides, Geraldine Chaplin as Lady Jessica, Orson Welles as Vladimir Harkonnen, Salvador Dalí as Emperor Shaddam IV, Amanda Lear as Princess Irulan, Gloria Swanson as Gaius Helen Mohiam, Mick Jagger as Feyd-Rautha, and Jodorowsky's son Brontis as Paul Atreides. The project was abandoned in 1976. The attempt was the basis of the 2013 documentary Jodorowsky's Dune.	
1974–2004	Houdini	James Bridges (1974); Robert Zemeckis (1992); Paul Verhoeven (1997–1998)	Anthony Burgess, Carol Sobieski, William Goodhart, William Hjortsberg, Jeffrey Price and Peter S. Seaman, Stephen J. Rivele and Christopher Wilkinson	Ray Stark	James Caan (1974); Tom Cruise (1992–1998)	Ray Stark desired to produce a biopic film centered on Harry Houdini's life and career, with Columbia Pictures being attached to distribute, but the project was stalled in development limbo for thirty years. Initially, Stark planned to co-produce with John Houseman, with James Bridges hired to direct, Anthony Burgess hired to write the screenplay, and James Caan cast for the titular role. Stark was unsatisfied with the initial vision, and he subsequently asked several other writers to submit their own takes on the story. In the early 1990s, Tom Cruise began to be considered for the role as Houdini. Robert Zemeckis became attached to direct, but upon struggling to figure out which direction the film required, he backed out to work on Forrest Gump. In 1997, a new script was decided upon, and Paul Verhoeven was hired to direct. The following year, Verhoeven also backed out to work on Hollow Man, and then Columbia tried and failed to have Ang Lee signed on. In 2004, Ray Stark died, and a Houdini biopic was never produced with his involvement.	
1975	Perfect Strangers	Michael Cimino	Michael Cimino	David V. Picker	Roy Scheider, Romy Schneider, Oskar Werner	In 1975, Perfect Strangers entered the early stages of pre-production at Paramount Pictures with a cast composed of Roy Scheider, Romy Schneider and Oskar Werner, and Michael Cimino aboard to helm the film based on his original screenplay. The project was described as a political love story that bore "some resemblance to Casablanca, involving the romantic relationship of three people." Due to various political and internal difficulties at the studio, the film was not made.	
1975–1978	The Micronauts	Don Sharp, Richard Loncraine and others	John Gay, Gordon Williams and others	Harry Saltzman	Gregory Peck, Lee Remick, James Mason, Honor Blackman, Stacy Keach	Adaptation of novel Cold War in a Country Garden. Some test and special effects footage was shot. Principal photography did not begin. No scenes with the leads were shot.	
1975–1996	Osioł grający na lirze	Wojciech Has	Jadwiga Kukułczanka			Based on a script by Jadwiga Kukułczana written in 1975, Wojciech Has planned to direct a Polish-French co-production. On December 12, 1981, he was scheduled to fly to Paris, but the director missed his flight, and because martial law in Poland imposed travel restrictions the following day, filming was impossible. Wojciech Has continued to return, attempting to produce the film. In 1996, Jadwiga Kukułczanka attempted to produce the film in a French-Spanish co-production, but due to illness and work commitments, Wojciech Has was unable to work on the film.	
1976–1979	Warhead (a.k.a. James Bond of the Secret Service)		Len Deighton, Sean Connery, Kevin McClory	Kevin McClory for Paramount Pictures	Sean Connery (reportedly being paid US$5M)	Financing and legal troubles doomed the project. McClory eventually licensed his rights to Jack Schwartzman who made Never Say Never Again, which has an entirely different screenplay. McClory continued his attempts to produce versions of Warhead into the 2000s.	
1977–1987	Ronnie Rocket	David Lynch	David Lynch	Stuart Cornfeld	Dexter Fletcher (1980); Michael J. Anderson (1987)	After releasing 1977's Eraserhead, David Lynch began work on the screenplay for Ronnie Rocket, also subtitled The Absurd Mystery of the Strange Forces of Existence. Lynch described the film as being "about electricity and a three-foot guy with red hair". He and his agent Marty Michaelson initially attempted to find financial backing for the project, but the studio they met with never got back in touch. Later, Lynch met film producer Stuart Cornfeld who was interested in producing Ronnie Rocket, but when the two realized the project was unlikely to find sufficient financing, Lynch asked to see some other scripts to work from for his next film instead. Lynch would return again to Ronnie Rocket after each of his films, intending it, at different stages, as the follow-up not only to Eraserhead or The Elephant Man but also Dune and Blue Velvet. Brad Dourif, Dennis Hopper, Jack Nance, Isabella Rossellini, Harry Dean Stanton, and Dean Stockwell have also been considered for roles in the film at various times. Lynch visited Northern England to scout a filming location, but found that the industrial cities he had hoped to use had become too modernized to fit his intended vision. The project suffered setbacks because of the bankruptcy of several potential backers.	
1979	The First Day (Russian: Первый День Pervyj Dyen)	Andrei Tarkovsky	Based on a script by Andrei Konchalovsky	Goskino USSR	Natalya Bondarchuk and Anatoli Papanov	The film was set in 18th-century Russia during the reign of Tsar Peter the Great. As the film was critical of the USSR's state atheism, Tarkovsky submitted a different script to Goskino USSR than the one he actually filmed, with several extra scenes criticizing state atheism. After shooting about half of the film, this was discovered by censors and the project was halted by Goskino. Infuriated, Tarkovsky reportedly destroyed most of the footage he had shot.	
1979 or 1980	The Lawbreakers	David Lean	Robert Bolt (based on Richard Hough's novel Captain Bligh and Mr. Christian)	Phil Kellogg, Bernard Williams	Christopher Reeve, Anthony Hopkins, Hugh Grant	David Lean and Robert Bolt began working on a script in October 1977, planning to adapt the source novel into two films; The Lawbreakers and The Long Arm. In November 1977, Dino De Laurentiis announced he would finance the project, and in December Paramount Pictures signed on to distribute. The intention was to shoot the film in Tahiti, where De Laurentiis had a large facility built. Producer Bernard Williams budgeted The Lawbreakers alone at $40 million, and De Laurentiis decided he could not afford to proceed. The first film's script was finished in November 1978, but Bolt later suffered from a heart attack followed by a stroke, leaving the second incomplete. Lean was ultimately forced to abandon the project after overseeing casting and the construction of the Bounty replica which cost $4 million. De Laurentiis did not want to lose the millions he had already invested, so he looked for a new director. Christopher Reeve stayed on as Fletcher Christian through the change in director, but he later dropped out at the last minute and was replaced by Mel Gibson. The film was released as one film, The Bounty, in 1984.	
1979 or 1980	The Long Arm	David Lean	Robert Bolt (based on Richard Hough's novel Captain Bligh and Mr. Christian)	Phil Kellogg, Bernard Williams	Christopher Reeve, Anthony Hopkins, Hugh Grant		
1979 or 1980	The Short Night	Alfred Hitchcock	David Freeman from Ronald Kirkbride's novel	Alfred Hitchcock for Universal Studios		Project cancelled due to Hitchcock's advanced years and ill-health.	
1979–1995	On the Road	Francis Ford Coppola	Francis Ford Coppola, Roman Coppola (based on the Jack Kerouac novel of the same name		Ethan Hawke, Brad Pitt	Francis Ford Coppola bought the screen rights to On the Road in 1979. Over the years, he hired several screenwriters to adapt the book into a film, including Michael Herr and Barry Gifford, only for Coppola to write his own draft with his son, Roman. In 1995, Coppola planned to shoot on black-and-white 16 mm film and held auditions with poet Allen Ginsberg in attendance but the project fell through. It was finally made by Walter Salles, and released in 2012.	
1979–1986	The Works	Lance Williams	Lance Williams	Alexander Schure		An animated feature about robots, it would have been the world's first computer animated movie had it been made. But because of technical limitations in computer power and tools back in the 70s and early 80s, the movie never went into actual production.	
Mid-to-late 1980s	Flamingos Forever	John Waters	John Waters	John Waters for New Line Cinema	Divine, Mary Vivian Pearce, Edith Massey, Mink Stole, Jean Hill	The unfilmed sequel to Pink Flamingos would have taken place 15 years after the events of the first movie. Troma Entertainment offered to finance the film at $600,000. However, the film was cancelled because Divine wanted to focus on more serious, male roles and Edith Massey died in 1984. Waters did not feel comfortable with Troma's post-editing facilities. The original screenplay can be found in his 1988 book Trash Trio.	
1980–1981	Night Skies	Tobe Hooper	John Sayles	Steven Spielberg		In the late 1970s, Columbia Pictures was interested in making a sequel to Close Encounters of the Third Kind. Spielberg wasn't interested in a sequel, but he didn't want the film made without him. He decided to write a science fiction horror film based on an with Kelly–Hopkinsville encounter, which told the story of extraterrestrial scientists studying animals on Earth, which are sentient until they attract human attention. The opening scene, showing Earth from space, was planned to be filmed during a shuttle flight, and the film was to feature an alien character forming a relationship with a child. The production was ultimately abandoned, but individual storylines and elements influenced E.T., Poltergeist, and Gremlins, to which Spielberg adapted them.	
1980–1985	The Spirit	Brad Bird	Brad Bird, Jerry Rees	Gary Kurtz		In the 1980s, animator Brad Bird and other CalArts alums working at Walt Disney Animation Studios produced a pitch trailer for an animated feature based on Will Eisner's The Spirit. Bird sent letters and copies of the trailer to several high profile figures until producer Gary Kurtz decided to back the project. Kurtz secured the option and took Bird and Leiva to pitch the project to Will Eisner in New York, and while Eisner was initially hesitant as he never considered having his character adapted to animation Leiva and Bird won him over with their pitch trailer and finalized the deal with Kurtz not longtherafter. Eisner himself was heavily involved with development attending story conferences with Bird and Rees (as the screenplay was inspired by some of Eisner's original The Spirit stories), provided model sheets, and even had veto power over the artwork prior to principal photography. Eisner even stated that the majority of pre-production on the film had been completed. Many executives who read the script praised it but couldn't understand why they wanted to make it an animated film as it wasn't a fairy tale and didn't have any talking animals. Ultimately the project was abandoned after failing to find financial backing.	
1981–1983	Sea Trial	William Friedkin	Based on Frank De Felitta's novel	William Friedkin, Peter Guber, Jon Peters	Michael Nouri, Laura Branigan	Principal photography was announced to begin in the summer of 1983, though Fox ultimately cancelled the production.	
1984–1991	Gale Force	Renny Harlin	David Chappe	Daniel Melnick	Sylvester Stallone	The story is set in a small coastal community in South Carolina, where an ex-Navy SEAL returns from prison, but is unwelcome. He then has to fight a group of modern pirates who invade the community while it is being struck by a major hurricane. David Chappe first wrote a spec script for Gale Force in 1984, but after serving as a reader and editor in the industry, revised the story six times from 1987 to 1989. Chappe's final draft was so praised that it became subject to a bidding war between multiple studios, which Carolco Pictures won at $500,000, and it led to multiple bidding wars for spec scripts within the ensuing years. Sylvester Stallone was cast to star in Gale Force, and Renny Harlin was signed on to direct, but since the latter was promised creative control, requested multiple re-writes by other writers to increase the amount of action. In October 1991—two weeks before filming was scheduled to begin—Carolco cancelled the project after its projected budget reached $40 million, and since the studio struggled to figure out how to make the visual effects work. Harlin, Stallone, and the rest of the then-production team moved on to work on Cliffhanger, instead.	
1986	Paradise Road	Peter Bogdanovich	David Scott Milton, Peter Bogdanovich (from the novel of the same name)	Peter Bogdanovich	Frank Sinatra, James Stewart, Lee Marvin, Charles Aznavour, Dean Martin, Jerry Lewis, Sophia Loren, John Ritter	In the late 1980s, Peter Bogdanovich almost led an all-star cast for a comedy-drama set in Las Vegas called Paradise Road about degenerate gamblers who lose their casino in a poker game. However, the film was not made, due to the meddling of Sinatra's lawyers, as claimed by Bogdanovich.	
1987	Blest Souls	Michael Cimino	Eoghan Harris, Robert Bolt, Michael Cimino	Barry Spikings, Michael Cimino, Joann Carelli	Sean Bean, Tilda Swinton	Michael Cimino planned to make a film about 1920s Irish leader Michael Collins, going as far as going to County Kerry, Ireland to scout locations. The script was written by Eoghan Harris, but it was really a complete revision and rewriting of the script by Robert Bolt that Cimino worked from. Columbia Pictures was eager to do it, but then-parent Coca-Cola refused to give Cimino funding. It was canceled by 1987, and a rival script at Warner Bros. eventually was made by Neil Jordan.	
1987–1995	Isobar/The Train	Roland Emmerich, Ridley Scott	Dean Devlin, Steven E. de Souza, Jim Uhls	H. R. Giger, Joel Silver, Norris Spencer	Kim Basinger, Michael Jeter, Sylvester Stallone	The original concept for The Train envisioned a sci-fi horror film set in the near future, where the streets of Los Angeles are paralyzed by massive traffic jams. The alternative was a high-speed subway train that accidentally unleashes a genetically modified creature with a brain in the form of a hard drive, intended to be used for an artificial intelligence project. Written by Jim Uhls, the script was acquired by Carolco Pictures in 1987, and the following year, Ridley Scott decided to work on the project, enlisting the help of Norris Spencer. Ridley Scott left the project due to Joel Silver interfering with his vision. Silver then decided to rewrite the script, titling it "Isobar" after another unproduced sci-fi film script. After the rewrite, the story was to take place in a distant future where the Earth's surface is dangerous, and the creature was to be an evolution of life, adapted to exist in conditions hostile to humans, traveling by train to a research laboratory, where it was released and killing humans as it adapted to the prevailing conditions. Roland Emmerich was hired to direct the film, but he was dissatisfied with Isobar's script, which contained a large number of copied scenes from the first two Alien films and contained a plethora of illogical errors, prompting him to commission rewrites from Devlin. However, Joel hired Steven De Souza to work on the script, dissatisfied with the description of the monster. As a result, De Souza improved the description, improving the world depicted, justifying the existence of an intercontinental train by introducing the theme of global warming, which has contaminated most of the Earth and made air travel impossible, requiring people to wear masks. The main protagonists are participants in the inaugural train ride between New York City to London. A week before the planned start of set construction, Carolco Pictures canceled production due to financial problems, and after the premiere of Cutthroat Island, Carolco Pictures went bankrupt, preventing the film from being produced. In the following years, attempts were made to return to production of the Isobar, but due to lack of funds, production was not carried out.	
1987 or 1988	Winchell	Bob Fosse	Michael Herr	Robert Benton	Robert De Niro	Fosse started to work on the biographical film based on the American newspaper gossip columnist Walter Winchell with Robert De Niro starring as Winchell. Before he could even start the picture, Fosse died.	
1988–1995	Spider-Man	James Cameron	James Cameron	James Cameron, Menahem Golan	Leonardo DiCaprio	In 1988, Carolco Pictures acquired the film rights to the Marvel comics superhero for $5 million, and they were mandated to credit Menahem Golan as an executive producer. A few years later, James Cameron was attached to direct the film, and he wrote his own scriptment that deconstructed Spider-Man's origin story in a gritty and realistic environment. Cameron, who was given the rights to control the credits, decided against including Golan's producer name. Golan, in turn, sued Carolco for the ordeal in 1993, and it escalated to multiple legal battles between Carolco, Marvel, Columbia Pictures, Viacom, and MGM, since Marvel's licensing agreements with each company overlapped each other with dubious and poor documents. By 1996, Carolco and Marvel both filed for bankruptcy, but the latter emerged in 1998, legally retook the film rights, and quickly sold them to Columbia. Columbia, in turn, produced the 2002 Spider-Man film with a different production team and cast, but some scarce elements from Cameron's scriptment were carried over.	
Late 1980s	Leningrad: The 900 Days	Sergio Leone	Based on Harrison Salisbury's non-fiction The 900 Days: The Siege Of Leningrad	Sergio Leone	Robert De Niro	After Once Upon a Time in America, Sergio Leone spent the remainder of his life preparing to produce and direct an epic war film set during the Siege of Leningrad with Robert De Niro playing an American journalist inside the city. Having raised $100 million in funding and discussed location filming with the Soviet government, Leone died of a heart attack before production could begin in earnest.	
Late 1980s	Oil and Vinegar	Howard Deutch	John Hughes		Molly Ringwald, Matthew Broderick	After he finished writing the script for Pretty in Pink, Hughes wrote the script of a film titled Oil and Vinegar, which was to star Matthew Broderick and Molly Ringwald as a couple who "spend a day in a motel room, swapping stories on life and love". According to Broderick, "It was very intimate: it was just the two of them, basically, is my memory, often in a car. It was a very typical romantic comedy about two very different people who fell in love, but it was very inventive in its smallness." The film was to have been released by Universal Pictures, but Hughes objected when the studio asked for rewrites. Therefore, the creative differences between Hughes and Universal, along with Broderick and Ringwald's scheduling conflicts, are credited for why the film was never made.	
1989–2000	Ocean of Storms	Martin Scorsese	Ben Young Mason, Tony Bill, Wesley Strick, Robert Towne, Lawrence Wright, Stephen Harrigan, Aaron Sorkin	Warren Beatty	Warren Beatty	The film's story, originally written by Ben Young Mason and Tony Bill, was to focus on an aging astronaut who emerges from retirement and rejoins the space program to relive his past life, and he falls in love with a female astronaut along the way. Warren Beatty acquired the Ocean of Storms screenplay with the desire to produce and star in the project, with 20th Century Fox attached to distribute. Beatty only desired to retain one scene, and he subsequently approached multiple writers to revise the rest of the story. In 1993, Beatty approached Martin Scorsese to direct the film, with Wesley Strick approached to rewrite on Scorsese's behalf, but the deal was never finalized. In 1996, Aaron Sorkin was hired to rewrite the script, but he was later underpaid and fired for not submitting his draft on time, while Sorkin was tasked to write a different screenplay for Fox and Beatty. He subsequently sued them both for the wrongdoing. By 2000, with the successful release of Clint Eastwood's Space Cowboys, which follows a similar premise, development on Ocean of Storms was quietly abandoned.	
1990–1997	Beetlejuice Goes Hawaiian		Jonathan Gems			The film was in development in 1990, with a script by Jonathan Gems. It was supposed to tell the story of the Deetz family moving to Hawaii to build a resort, which turned out to be built on the site of a former cemetery. Beetlejuice was supposed to get involved, accidentally awakening a ghost and causing chaos. Due to an unsatisfactory story idea and Warner Bros.'s insistence on a Batman sequel, the film was ultimately abandoned.	
1990–2005	The Magic 7	Roger Holzberg	Roger Holzberg	Roger Holzberg; John Kilkenny; Ron Layton	John Candy, Michael J. Fox, Jeremy Irons, James Earl Jones, Ice-T, Dirk Benedict, Madeline Kahn	A fantastic animated film with an all-star cast, it was originally scheduled to premiere on Earth Day, April 22, 1997, before being pushed back to 2005. The deaths of several key actors and financial difficulties led to the film being shelved.	
1991	Night Ride Down	Harold Becker	Willard Huyck and Gloria Katz		Harrison Ford	Set during a Brotherhood of Sleeping Car Porters strike in the 1930s, Harrison Ford was cast to portray a Pullman Sleeping Car Company executive and lawyer whose daughter is kidnapped to discredit the union. Ford described the project as "a running, jumping and falling down movie, on trains", an action-adventure trope he had similarly experienced in the Indiana Jones franchise. Filming was scheduled to take place in Chicago from September 25 to November 5, 1991. Some mainline steam locomotives and several pieces of rolling stock were to be leased and filmed on the Elgin, Joliet and Eastern Railway. By August, Harold Becker had the script reworked to help remedy the effects of the early 1990s recession, but the changes dissatisfied Ford, and he backed out. With a projected budget of over $46 million, production on Night Ride Down was quickly cancelled by Paramount Pictures. Due to a debt Paramount owed Ford for the cancellation, he went on to replace Alec Baldwin as Jack Ryan in Patriot Games.	
1991	Nostromo	David Lean	David Lean, Maggie Unsworth (from the Joseph Conrad novel of the same name)	Serge Silberman	Georges Corraface, Marlon Brando, Paul Scofield, Peter O'Toole, Isabella Rossellini, Christopher Lambert, Dennis Quaid	During the last years of his life, David Lean was in pre-production of a film version of Joseph Conrad's Nostromo. Steven Spielberg was initially attached to produce the project, with the backing of Warner Bros., but after several rewrites and disagreements on the script, he left the project and was replaced by Serge Silberman. Several writers circled the project, including Christopher Hampton and Robert Bolt, but their work was abandoned. In the end, Lean decided to write the film himself with the assistance of Maggie Unsworth (wife of cinematographer Geoffrey Unsworth). Originally Lean considered filming in Mexico but later decided to film in London and Madrid. Nostromo had a total budget of $46 million and was six weeks away from filming at the time of Lean's death. It has been rumored that fellow film director John Boorman would take over, but the production collapsed.	
1993–1994	Crusade	Paul Verhoeven	Walon Green		Arnold Schwarzenegger, John Turturro, Robert Duvall, Gary Sinise, Charlton Heston, Jennifer Connelly	Set during the Crusades in the late 11th century, the historical epic film was to focus on a thief named Hagen, who after faking a miracle, became a high-profile figure during the battles. Arnold Schwarzenegger first expressed interest in starring in a Crusades-based film during production of Total Recall. Paul Verhoeven, in turn, hired Walon Green to write a script, and then pre-production began in 1993. By May 1994, shortly before filming was scheduled to begin in Spain, the film's projected budget reached $100 million, and when Verhoeven refused to reassure that it could have been maintained or lowered, the financially-frail Carolco Pictures cancelled Crusade. Schwarzenegger obtained the rights to revive the project under another studio.	
1995–1998	The Incredible Hulk	Joe Johnston (1997); Jonathan Hensleigh (1997–1998)	Jonathan Hensleigh, John Turman, Zak Penn, J. J. Abrams, Scott Alexander and Larry Karaszewski	Jonathan Hensleigh, Gale Anne Hurd, Avi Arad		A film based on the Marvel Comics character had been in development at Universal Pictures since 1990, and in 1995, Jonathan Hensleigh became attached to co-produce via his wife Gale Anne Hurd. In April 1997, Hensleigh was tasked to rewrite the script, as Joe Johnston was hired to direct. In July 1997, Johnston backed out to direct October Sky, and Hensleigh quickly convinced Universal to make the Hulk film his feature directorial debut. By March 1998, when principal photography was scheduled to begin, the film's projected budget reached $100 million, with $20 million already spent on pre-production. An uneasy Universal quickly cancelled production and asked for a lower-budget script to be written. Feeling the rewrite was too complicated to fulfill, Hensleigh backed out.	
1995–1998	I Am Legend	Ridley Scott	Mark Protosevich, John Logan, Neal Jimenez, Ridley Scott (based on the novel of the same name by Richard Matheson)	Neal H. Moritz	Arnold Schwarzenegger	In 1995, Warner Bros. began development on a film adaptation of Richard Matheson's post-apocalyptic novel, and Mark Protosevich was hired to write the screenplay. By June 1997, Ridley Scott was hired to direct, but since the latter was promised creative liberties, John Logan was tasked to rewrite the script. Scott and Logan's psychological-thriller version lacked dialogue in the first half and came with a sombre conclusion, which Warner Bros. was concerned with and wound up having Protosevich rehired to rewrite. By December 1997, the film's projected budget reached $108 million, and as the studio experienced a streak of box office failures at the time, Scott reduced the budget by $20 million. In March 1998, the studio cancelled the project, following further box office failures.	
1996	The Double	Roman Polanski	Jeremy Leven (from the Fyodor Dostoevsky novel of the same name)	Lili Fini Zanuck, Todd Black	John Travolta or Steve Martin, Isabelle Adjani, John Goodman, Jean Reno	Travolta reportedly stormed out of rehearsals thereby shutting down pre-production. Shooting to have begun in May 1996. Travolta was being paid US$17M. Robert Richardon was signed to photograph the film and Pierre Guffroy designed the sets. Martin replaced Travolta, but Travolta became involved with a legal battle with the production company, which ended up cancelling The Double before filming began.	
1996	Seksmisja 3, czyli graniasta cytryna	Juliusz Machulski	Juliusz Machulski, Ryszard Zatorski			The script for the film was written in 1996, but production was abandoned due to high costs and the ongoing production of the films Kiler and Kiler-ów 2-óch. Ultimately, the script was turned into a book.	
1996–1998	Superman Lives	Tim Burton	Kevin Smith, Wesley Strick, Dan Gilroy	Jon Peters	Nicolas Cage	A film based on DC Comics superhero Superman was developed by Warner Bros. for two years, with Burton directing. Smith, Strick and Gilroy wrote scripts; Cage was hired to play Superman. Filming was scheduled to begin in early 1998 but was repeatedly pushed back. The studio had spent $30 million on the film by the time it was cancelled in 1998. The attempt was the basis of the documentary The Death of "Superman Lives": What Happened?	
1997–1998	The Age of Aquarius	Phil Alden Robinson	Phil Alden Robinson		Harrison Ford, Kristin Scott Thomas	Set throughout the Middle East in 1984, the war-romance film would have focused on a mercenary who delivers food and weapons to war-devastated countries for profit. Along the way, he falls in love with an estranged Bosnian woman and later rescues her from the war-ravaged Sarajevo. Harrison Ford agreed to take on the leading role for $20 million, and Kristin Scott Thomas was to take on the female lead. Universal Pictures financed the project and was reportedly planned to distribute it internationally, while DreamWorks Pictures was to distribute domestically. Principal photography was scheduled to begin in February 1998, but by that time, the film's projected budget reached $100 million, and unwilling to spend that amount of money for the film, Universal cancelled production. Ford and Thomas both went on to star in Random Hearts, instead.	
1997–1999	Brasil 1500 (American title: Gonçalo)	Michael Cimino	Fábio Fonseca, David Newman	Ilya Salkind, Jane Chaplin, Cláudio Kahns	Antonio Banderas, Paul Scofield	This Brazilian-American co-production, budgeted at $35 million, intended to portray the events of April 21, 1500 in Santa Cruz de Cabrália, the landing of Pedro Álvares Cabral's flagship in Brazil. Written by Fábio Fonseca, with revisions by David Newman, filming was initially set for early 1998, and then again in early 1999, for a planned release in 2000 coinciding with the 500th anniversary of the discovery of Brazil. The film was to be told through the eyes of a fictional character, (similarly to Titanic), Gonçalo, a Portuguese sailor from Cabral's fleet. Antonio Banderas considered to star, with a supporting cast composed largely of Brazilian natives. Locations included Porto Seguro, Portugal, and studios in Los Angeles. Director Michael Cimino claimed that an exact replica of Cabral's flagship had been constructed for the production.	
1998–2012	1906	Brad Bird	Brad Bird	Pixar; Warner Bros. Pictures		A live-action crime film about the 1906 San Francisco earthquake, written by Brad Bird in 1998, was later auctioned off to Warner Bros. Pictures. Following the box office success of The Incredibles, Brad Bird was tapped to direct 1906. The film's budget was estimated at $200 million. Due to costs and financial risks, production was suspended.	
1998–2000	Fallout		Brent V. Friedman				
1999–2005	Flora Plum	Jodie Foster	Steven Rogers	Jodie Foster, Barry Mendel	Claire Danes, Russell Crowe (left project), Ewan McGregor	Foster planned to direct the romance film set among 1930s circus performers, and the start of filming was delayed after Crowe sustained a shoulder injury and left the project. McGregor replaced Crowe, but the project was abandoned in 2005.	
1999–2001	Nosebleed	Renny Harlin	Jackie Chan, Raven Metzner, Stu Zicherman		Jackie Chan	This action film was supposed to tell the story of a New York skyscraper window washer who learns that terrorists are planning to blow up the World Trade Center towers and the Statue of Liberty, forcing him to take action to thwart the terrorists plans. Production was abandoned after the attacks on the World Trade Center on September 11, 2001.	
2002–2006	Monsters, Inc. 2: Lost in Scaradise			Circle Seven Animation		A sequel to Monsters, Inc. that would have taken place a year after the events of the previous film. Due to Disney's acquisition of Pixar and the closure of Circle Seven Animation, work on the sequel was abandoned.	
2004	A Cold Case	Mark Romanek	John Sayles, Eric Roth (from the Philip Gourevitch novel of the same name)	Tom Hanks, Gary Goetzman	Tom Hanks, Robert De Niro	Mark Romanek's dream project was an adaptation of the procedural novel A Cold Case starring Tom Hanks as chief investigator Andy Rosenzweig. Robert De Niro also signed on for a role. The film was in the late stages of pre-production when it was suddenly pulled due to life rights issues with the novel. Subsequent revivals of the film would too be halted due to Hanks' commitment with other roles at the time. "I hope to make it someday and in a way," said Romanek. "It's a part for Tom Hanks that might be a lot more affecting when he's older."	
2004–2011	At The Mountain of Madness	Guillermo Del Toro	Del Toro and Matthew Robbins	Susan Montford, Don Murphy, James Cameron	Tom Cruise	Del Toro had been developing the film since 2004 and was set up at Dreamworks Pictures; In 2010, Universal Pictures bought the project and James Cameron attached to producer. By 2011, Tom Cruise was attached to star and test footage and concept art was crafted but Universal Pictures believed a horror skewing, R-rated film was unprofitable with a $150 million budget and cancelled it. In 2022, Del Toro shared test footage produced for the film.	
2004	Time Between Trains	Todd Field	Scott Smith, Todd Field (based on Gene Smith's non-fiction American Gothic)	Todd Field, William Horberg, Sydney Pollack, Anthony Minghella		Time Between Trains was an American Civil War-era biopic of the famed stage actor Edwin Booth, brother of Lincoln assassin John Wilkes Booth. The project had found its roots in American Gothic, a book by Gene Smith about the Booth family, optioned by DreamWorks Pictures for Field, with Scott Smith tapped to write the script. Field claimed he spent months doing his own research in the Theater Collection at Harvard's Pusey Library and was ultimately unwilling to compromise on the historical detail required to depict five major cities over a 50-year span, which would have put the budget in the $50 million to $80 million range. DreamWorks halted the project after executive Michael De Luca left the company.	
2007–2008	Justice League: Mortal	George Miller	Kieran Mulroney, Michele Mulroney	Dan Lin, Doug Mitchell, Barrie M. Osborne	Armie Hammer, D. J. Cotrona, Megan Gale, Adam Brody, Common, Santiago Cabrera, Jay Baruchel	Miller began preproduction on the live-action adaptation of the animated series Justice League Unlimited in 2007. The cast included Armie Hammer (Batman), D.J. Cotrona (Superman), Megan Gale (Wonder Woman), Adam Brody (The Flash), Common (Green Lantern), Santiago Cabrera (Aquaman), and Jay Baruchel (Maxwell Lord) who had begun training for the film. Filming was scheduled to begin in February 2008 but was postponed due to script and budget issues, the 2007–08 WGA strike, and Warner Bros. deciding against having another film version of Batman with The Dark Knight in post-production.	
2007–2010	Pinkville	Oliver Stone	Mikko Alanne		Bruce Willis, Channing Tatum, Woody Harrelson, Michael Peña, Cam Gigandet, Xzibit	In August 2007, it was announced that Oliver Stone was going to make Pinkville, a dramatization about the My Lai massacre. The film was to have starred Bruce Willis, Channing Tatum and Woody Harrelson in the lead roles. However, on November that same year, the project was postponed by its distributor, United Artists, in the wake of the 2007–08 Writers Guild of America strike. In January 2008, it was announced that the project was officially cancelled. It was later reported in December 2010 that Stone had spoken with Shia LaBeouf about considering to revive Pinkville with the latter starring.	
2007–2009	X-Men Origins: Magneto	David S. Goyer	Sheldon Turner		Ian McKellen	In December 2004, 20th Century Fox hired screenwriter Sheldon Turner to draft a spin-off X-Men film, and he chose to write Magneto, pitching it as "The Pianist meets X-Men". It would be this superhero film intended to be part of the Origins series, which was to tell a biographical story of Magneto set between 1939–1955, who after the war hunts Nazis for the torture he suffered at Auschwitz. Due to the age of actor Ian McKellen, they had to change the script and the decision was made to set the film in 1962. Following the negative reception of X-Men Origins: Wolverine upon its release, 20th Century Fox decided not to pursue production. Ultimately, some of the storylines that were supposed to appear ended up in the film X-Men: First Class.	
2008–2010	Newt	Gary Rydstrom	Gary Rydstrom; Leslie Caveny	Pixar		Pixar's animated film, which was to tell the story of a newt whose species is in danger of extinction, involved a group of scientists attempting to mate two newts through love, thus exposing them to a complicated love story. The film was initially scheduled for release in 2011, but was later postponed to 2012. Due to script problems and the development of Blue Sky Studios' film Rio, which had a similar plot, the beginning of 2010 the decision was made to cancel production.	
2008–2010	Spider-Man 4	Sam Raimi	David Lindsay-Abaire, Gary Ross		Tobey Maguire, Kirsten Dunst	Sam Raimi's Spider-Man film, which was to be set five years after the events of the part three. Work on the script lasted from 2008 to 2009. Due to the poor reception of the third installment, Raimi's conflicts with Sony regarding the overall series and pressure to premiere the film in May 2011 from the studio's side, works on the sequel was canceled in January 2010.	
2009–2013	1905	Kiyoshi Kurosawa			Atsuko Maeda, Shota Matsuda, Tony Leung Chiu Wai	A Sino-Japanese cooperative production, set in 1905 at the end of the Qing dynasty, about a loan shark who comes to Japan to collect a debt from five men. Due to problems with Tony Leung's involvement, who was supposed to play the loan shark, a dispute over the Senkaku Islands, and the bankruptcy of the Prenom H studio, work on the film was abandoned.	
2009–2012	The Adventures of Thomas	Shane Acker	Josh Klausner, Will McRobb, Chris Viscardi	Julia Pistor		In March 2009, HIT Entertainment launched a studio division, HIT Movies, to begin producing theatrical films based on their children's IPs, and Julia Pistor was hired to produce them. HiT quickly decided on a live-action Thomas & Friends film as their first project, and Shane Acker was later attached to direct. Weta Digital was to be contracted to design the visual effects. The film's story, first written by Josh Klausner, was to be set during World War II, focusing on a boy and his father who had drifted apart before the former visits the Island of Sodor, which Acker described as "a world of trains without people".	
2010–2012	Eastern Promises 2	David Cronenberg	Steven Knight	Paul Webster	Vincent Cassel, Viggo Mortensen	In 2010, work was planned on a sequel to Eastern Promises, the action of which was to take place in Russia, where the film was to be shot. The film was scheduled to begin shooting in early 2013, but in August 2012, the film was abandoned due to costs incurred by Focus Features and Steve Knight's loss of interest in the project, who withdrew from the sequel.	
2010–2017	Me and My Shadow	Edgar Wright					
2010–2012	Paradise Lost	Alex Proyas			Casey Affleck, Camilla Belle, Diego Boneta, Bradley Cooper, Djimon Hounsou, Callan McAuliffe, Dominic Purcell, Sam Reid, Rufus Sewell, Benjamin Walker		
2011–2012	Arthur & Lancelot	David Dobkin	David Dobkin		Joel Kinnamon, Kit Harington, Gary Oldman, Colin Farrell, James McAvoy	In the summer of 2011, Warner Bros. Pictures bought the project with David Dobkin writing and directing; an initial budget of $90 million was set. By January 2012, Warner Bros. had removed the film from the release schedule and was considering cancelling it after being unsatisfied by the attached stars, Joel Kinnamon and Kit Harington (who were unknown actors at that time), and with the fact that the budget had escalated to $130 million. Later, the studio fired Kinnamon and Harrington and attempted to cast Colin Farrell, James McAvoy, and Gary Oldman but were unsuccessful and ultimately cancelled the film.	
2012–2020	Sesame Street	Jonathan Krisel	Jonathan Krisel, Chris Galletta	Shawn Levy, Jesse Ehrman, Guymon Casady, Michael Aguilar	Anne Hathaway, Chance the Rapper, Bo Burnham		
2014–2019	Gambit	Various	Josh Zetumer	Lauren Shuler Donner	Channing Tatum	Preproduction on a film based on the Marvel Comics character Gambit began in 2014 with Tatum in the lead. Numerous directors were announced for the project including Rupert Wyatt, Doug Liman and Gore Verbinski. Production was scheduled to begin numerous times in New Orleans, until Disney cancelled the project in 2019.	
2014–2017	The Trap	Harmony Korine	Harmony Korine	Charles-Marie Anthonioz	Idris Elba, Benicio del Toro, Robert Pattinson, Al Pacino, James Franco, Gucci Mane	Jamie Foxx was initially cast to star, but was replaced by Idris Elba. Benicio del Toro landed a role in Star Wars: The Last Jedi, which also delayed the production. Four weeks before shooting began, the financiers pulled out.	
2015–2017	Five Nights at Freddy's	Gil Kenan	Gil Kenan, Tyler Burton Smith	Roy Lee, David Katzenberg, Seth Grahame-Smith		In April 2015, Warner Bros. Pictures announced the production of a film adaptation based on the franchise of the same title. Due to conflicts between Warner Bros. and series creator Scott Cawthon, production moved to Blumhouse Productions in March 2017.	
2015–2017	Gigantic	Nathan Greno; Meg LeFauve		Dorothy McKim		Animation musical fantasy set in Spain during age of exploration based on novel Jack and the Beanstalk produced by Walt Disney Studios Motion Pictures. The premiere was initially planned for March 2018, and then postponed premiere for November 25, 2020, but work on the production was interrupted in October 2017 due to problems with writing the story for the film's script.	
2016–2018	Metro 2033		F. Scott Frasier	Dmitry Glukhovsky		In 2012, MGM acquired the rights to adapt Dmitry Glukhovsky book under the same title. Pre-production work on the film began in March 2016, and the studio hired F. Scott Frasier to write the script which was to be placed in post-apocalyptic Washington, D.C. instead of in Moscow Metro changing the meaning from the original fractions and removing the thread of xenophobia and Dark Ones. Glukhovsky did not like the idea, criticizing him for the Americanization of his book, and blocked work on the production in December 2018, regaining the copyright to the book.	
2017–2018	Beyond The Sky/Planes 3			Disneytoon Studios		A sequel to the Planes franchise, this film was supposed to be about space exploration. The film's premiere was scheduled for April 12, 2019. The film was canceled due to the closure of Disneytoon Studios.	
2017–2018	Silver & Black	Gina Prince-Bythewood	Lindsey Beer, Geneva Robertson-Dworet	Amy Pascal, Matt Tolmach		Based on the Marvel characters Silver Sable and Black Cat. Filming was delayed indefinitely before the planned start of production in March 2018 because Prince-Bythewood was not happy with the script. The film was cancelled in August 2018.	
2019–2024	Hulkamania	Todd Phillips	Scott Silver		Chris Hemsworth	A Hulk Hogan biopic was supposed to be produced by Netflix. A contractual error regarding payment prevented the film from entering production.	
2021–2022	Zatanna		Emerald Fennell	Bad Robot, Warner Bros. Discovery		It was supposed to be a live-action superhero production about the titular DC Comics character Zatanna, announced is intended for the streaming platform HBO Max, with work beginning in March 2021. Production was canceled in autumn 2022 due to changes in Warner Bros.' studio strategy due to the departure of high-budget films for streaming platforms.	
2022–2025	Blade			Kevin Feige, Marvel Studios	Mahershala Ali	In 2019, it was announced that Mahershala Ali would star in a Marvel Cinematic Universe film about the character Blade. In 2021, Bassam Tariq was hired as the director. Pre-production began in 2022, with an expected release date of 2023. In September 2022, Tariq left the project. Ali handpicked Yann Demange as a replacement director, and the film was rewritten. The film experienced further delays due to the 2023 Writer's Guild of America and SAG-AFTRA strikes. In early 2024, Demange left the project, and Disney announced plans to scale back Marvel content. In 2025, it was reported that the film's production was on pause, and in 2026 Ali announced that he had moved on from playing Blade.	
2022	Driftwood	Victor Courtright	Victor Courtright			In May 2022, a animated film created by Victor Courtright was announced as a space opera with an ecological message about a rabbit-like creature named Clover who teams up with Marigold and Caspia to defeat the evil ruler Thorn in order to save his home from a toxic fuel source. The film was originally intended for the streaming platform HBO Max. After three months, production was canceled in August due to changes in HBO Max's financial strategy.	
2022	Wonder Twins	Adam Sztykiel	Adam Sztykiel	Marty Bowen, Wyck Godfrey	KJ Apa, Isabel May	A superhero DC movie about the titular Wonder Twins, intended for the streaming platform HBO Max. The film was budgeted at $35 million USD, but due to production costs rising to $75 million, the project was canceled before filming began.	
2023–2025	Killing Gawker	Gus Van Sant	Charles Randolph		Ben Affleck, Matt Damon	Work began in 2024 on this film about the Bollea v. Gawker court case, based on Ryan Holiday's book Conspiracy: Peter Thiel, Hulk Hogan, Gawker and the Anatomy of Intrigue. Production was halted several months before Hulk Hogan's death.	

== Films abandoned during filming or animation ==
Films that were abandoned after principal photography had commenced, or in the case of animated films, after animation had begun.

Year of production	Film	Director	Screenwriter	Producer	Cast	Notes	Ref
1913	Obrona Częstochowy	Edward Puchalski		Wytwórnia filmowa Sokół		The film is based on the novel Deluge by Henryk Sienkiewicz about the Swedish Deluge. Work was halted when the creators did not receive permission from the Russian authorities for the army to participate in outdoor filming. The scenes recorded for the film were later used to produce ''The Deluge'', which premiered in 1915.	
1919	The Professor	Charlie Chaplin	Charlie Chaplin	Charles D. Hall	Albert Austin, Henry Bergman, Charlie Chaplin, Loyal Underwood, Tom Wilson		
1920–1925	The Throwback	Arthur Shirley	Pat O'Cotter	Ernest Higgins, Arthur Shirley			
1922	Number 13 (a.k.a. Mrs. Peabody)	Alfred Hitchcock	Anita Ross	Alfred Hitchcock for Gainsborough Pictures	Clare Greet, Ernest Thesiger	Production stopped when funding ran out.	
1930–1934	Great Day	Harry Beaumont, Harry A. Pollard			Joan Crawford, Johnny Mack Brown, John Miljan, Anita Page, Marjorie Rambeau, John Charles Thomas		
1931	Creation	Willis H. O'Brien	Story by Edgar Rice Burroughs	Merian C. Cooper, David O. Selznick	Ralf Harolde		
1935–1937	Bezhin Meadow	Sergei Eisenstein	Isaak Babel, Sergei M. Eisenstein, Aleksandr Rzheshevsky, based on a story by Ivan Turgenev	V. Ya. Babitsky	Vitya Kartashov, Nikolai Khmelyov, Pavel Ardzhanov, Yekaterina Teleshova, Erast Garin, Nikolai Maslov, Boris Zakhava	A Soviet propaganda film based on the story of the Pavlik Morozov.	
1935–1936	Le avventure di Pinocchio	Raoul Verdini, Umberto Spano		Carlo Bachini; Mario Pompei; Amerigo Tot; CAIR		An animated film based on the novel The Adventures of Pinocchio, commissioned by Alfredo Rocco to create the first Italian animated film. The film was never completed due to technical and financial problems, which led to the closure of the CAIR (Cartoni Animati Italiani Roma) studio.	
1936	I Loved a Soldier / Invitation to Happiness	Henry Hathaway	Lajos Bíró, John van Druten, Grover Jones, Melchior Lengyel, Alice De Soos	Benjamin Glazer, Ernst Lubitsch	Charles Boyer, Walter Catlett, Marlene Dietrich, Margaret Sullavan, Lionel Stander		
1937	I, Claudius	Josef von Sternberg		Alexander Korda	Charles Laughton, Emlyn Williams and Merle Oberon	Production was dogged by ill-luck. A car accident involving Oberon caused filming to be abandoned.	
1939	Hania	Józef Lejtes	Bogdan Pepłowski; Stanisław Urbanowicz		Jadwiga Kuryluk	After completing filming on Inżynier Szeruda, director Józef Lejtes began work on an adaptation of Henryk Sienkiewicz's novella Hania, whose story was to be set during the January Uprising, based on other stories by Henryk Sienkiewicz. Initially, the film faced a serious problem due to the lack of actors, but after the selection of actors, the shooting was started in August 1939, but was interrupted shortly before German invasion of Poland due to the announcement of military mobilization. Józef Lejtes left Poland, spending the rest of his life in exile.	
1939	Legion Condor	Karl Ritter	Felix Lützkendorf, Karl Ritter	UFA	Paul Hartmann, Albert Hehn, Fritz Kampers	Anti-communist war film about the Condor Legion fighting in the Spanish Civil War. Production was halted in late August 1939 for political reasons following the Molotov–Ribbentrop Pact so as not to offend the Soviets.	
1939	Przybyli do wsi żołnierze	Romuald Gantkowski	Wiktor Budzyński, kpt. Jerzy Ciepielowski	Kohort	Józef Kondrat, Tadeusz Fijewski, Nina Świerczewska	A comedy film whose production was interrupted by the German invasion of Poland starting World War II.	
1939	Przygody pana Piorunkiewicza	Eugeniusz Cękalski	Stanisław Dygat, Eugeniusz Cękalski		Jan Kurnakowicz, Władysław Grabowski	A feature comedy intended for Polish Telegraphic Agency to promote achievements Second Polish Republic. Unfinished due to the German invasion of Poland starting World War II.	
1939	Straszny Dziadunio	Michał Wyszyński	Romana Czaplicka			Based on Maria Rodziewiczówna's novel of the same name, filming began at the turn of May and June 1939, but work on the film was suspended in August for unknown reasons and never resumed.	
1939	Szczęście przychodzi, kiedy chce	Mieczysław Krawicz	Anatol Stern	Libkow-Film	Lidia Wysocka; Kazimierz Junosza-Stępowski; Zofia Lindorf	A film of unknown content, scheduled for release in October 1939. The film was not completed due to by the German invasion of Poland starting World War II.	
1939	Uwaga! Szpieg	Eugeniusz Bodo	Napoleon Sądek, Stanisław Belski	Rex-Film	Eugeniusz Bodo, Helena Grossówna	The production was interrupted by the German invasion of Poland starting World War II.	
1942	It's All True	Orson Welles	Orson Welles, John Fante, Norman Foster, Robert Meltzer	Orson Welles	Ensemble	RKO cancelled the project after Welles had filmed for over five months. The project was the basis of the documentary It's All True: Based on an Unfinished Film by Orson Welles.	
1943	Sogno d'amore	Ferdinando Maria Poggioli	Sergio Amidei, Ferdinando Maria Poggioli	Vitalba	Miriam di San Servolo	A romantic film, the work on which was interrupted due to Mussolini's removal from power and the war situation related to the ongoing Italian campaign.	
1952	Un guapo del 900	Lucas Demare, Manuel Romero	Ulyses Petit de Murat	Lumiton	Pedro Maratea, Guillermo Battaglia, Nélida Bilbao, Milagros de la Vega and Santiago Gómez Cou	Shooting was halted after three weeks under Demare and one under Romero, when the studio went bankrupt; 120 shots were filmed between May and July 1952. It was remade twice: in 1960 by Leopoldo Torre Nilsson and in 1971 by Lautaro Murúa.	
1962	Something's Got to Give	George Cukor	Nunnally Johnson, Walter Bernstein	Henry T. Weinstein	Marilyn Monroe, Dean Martin	This was a remake of My Favorite Wife (1940). The film had shot for over a month when Monroe was fired. She was later rehired, but died before filming could resume. After her death, a different version of the film was made as Move Over, Darling (1963).	
1966	The Bells of Hell Go Ting-a-ling-a-ling (aka Oh Death, Where is Thy Sting-a-ling-a-ling?)	David Miller	Walter Mirisch	Roald Dahl	Gregory Peck, Ian McKellen, Maria Grazia Buccella	A film about fighter pilots in World War I. Filming started in Switzerland in 1966 but was held up through poor weather. Eventually, head of UA David V. Picker abandoned the project. Robert Altman spent several years trying to make the film before moving on.	
1967	Monsieur LeCoq	Seth Holt	Ian McLellan Hunter, Zero Mostel	Adrian Scott	Zero Mostel, Julie Newmar, Akim Tamiroff, Ronnie Corbett	Officially abandoned due to "poor weather conditions"	
1971	A Glimpse of Tiger	Anthony Harvey		Jack Brodsky, Elliott Gould	Elliott Gould, Kim Darby	Based on Herman Raucher's novel of the same title. Warner Bros. shut down the film being shot in New York City on Friday 6 March 1971. A germ of the idea was ultimately reworked into What's Up, Doc? (1972).	
1972	Game of Death	Bruce Lee			Bruce Lee	Bruce Lee died during filming. Several years later, a new story was crafted around the existing footage with other actors standing in for Lee.	
1974–1975	Jackpot	Terence Young	Millard Kaufman	William D. Alexander for Paramount Pictures	Richard Burton, James Coburn, Charlotte Rampling	Robert Mitchum was originally signed to co-star. Audrey Hepburn declined an offer to co-star. Burton played Reid Lawerence, an actor "paralysed by a falling lift." A media report claims that Burton would play an academy award-winning actor down on his luck who suddenly wins another academy award. The film was to be shot in Rome and Nice. Another media report claims that the story was about "a famous actor" who "fakes a grave illness" to collect insurance money. An article claims that "insurance swindle thriller" stalled due to a lack of funds. Terence Young claimed that he could have finished the film if he could have gotten the three stars together for one more week.	
1975	Bogart Slept Here	Mike Nichols	Neil Simon	Howard W. Koch	Robert De Niro, Marsha Mason	Production shut down after a week of filming, when Nichols realized that De Niro was unable to adjust his intense Method style of acting to Neil Simon's precise dialogue. Simon reconceived the story, which was filmed two years later as The Goodbye Girl.	
1975	The New Spartans	Jack Starrett			Oliver Reed (as a Colonel), Susan George	Production shut down after nine days of filming.	
1975	Closed-Up Tight (a.k.a. Fermeture Annuelle)	Cliff Owen	Probably Peter Welbeck (a.k.a. Harry Alan Towers)	Harry Alan Towers for Barongreen and Canafox Films (Montreal).	Marty Feldman (cat burglar), Annie Belle (his daughter), Ron Moody, Robin Askwith, Terry-Thomas, Yvon Dufour, Jacques Dufilho.	Production began in August 1975. Filmed for two weeks. A British-French-Canadian co-production. Rémy Julienne was stunt co-ordinator.	
1975	Trick or Treat	Michael Apted	based on Ray Connolly's novel	David Puttnam and Sandy Lieberson for Goodtimes Enterprises; also EMI Films and Playboy Productions	Bianca Jagger, Jan Smithers	Shot in Rome and about forty minutes of usable footage was shot before the shoot was cancelled.	
1976	Yockowald	Russell Rouse	Russell Rouse & Clarence Greene	Clarence Greene & Edmund McMullan	Tom Jones	Thriller about a CIA assassin, which would have been Tom Jones' dramatic debut. The film ran into financial trouble, and filming was halted after three weeks.	
1972–1976	Vileness Fats	Graeme Whifler & The Residents	The Residents	The Residents	Jay Clem, George Ewart, Marge Howard, Sally Lewis, Hugo Olson, Margaret Smyk & Danny Williams	From 1972 to 1976 multi-media group The Residents worked on a film called Vileness Fats. It was to be 'The Ultimate Underground film' and was teased in a number of their musical releases from that period, however in 1976 the project was unexpectedly abandoned by the group. In 1984 a short cut of scenes from the film was released on VHS as "Whatever Happened to Vileness Fats?"	
1977	Who Killed Bambi?	Russ Meyer, then Jonathan Kaplan	Roger Ebert and Malcolm McLaren		The Sex Pistols Marianne Faithfull	Intended partly as a vehicle to bring the Sex Pistols to American attention, Russ Meyer was three days into principal photography in October 1977 when production studio 20th Century Fox withdrew, dooming the project.	
1985	The Two Jakes	Robert Towne	Robert Towne	Robert Evans for Paramount Pictures	Jack Nicholson, Robert Evans, Kelly McGillis	Shut down during production because of disputes between writer-director Towne and producer/co-star Evans. The film was eventually shot and released in 1990 with Nicholson directing; this version co-starred Harvey Keitel and Meg Tilly.	
1987	Apt Pupil	Alan Bridges	Ken Wheat, Jim Wheat	Richard Kobritz	Nicol Williamson, Rick Schroder	An adaptation of Stephen King's novella Apt Pupil began filming in 1987 with Williamson cast as Kurt Dussander and Schroder cast as Todd Bowden. After ten weeks of filming, the production suffered from a lack of funds from its production company, Granat Releasing, and the film had to be placed on hold. An opportunity came to complete the film a year later, but by then Schroder had aged too considerably to shoot additional scenes. Forty minutes of usable footage was abandoned. A second attempt at the adaptation was released in 1998.	
1988	Atuk	Alan Metter	Tod Carroll	Elliot Abbott, Charles Roven, Don Carmody for United Artists	Sam Kinison, Christopher Walken, Ben Affleck	Based on Mordecai Richler's 1963 novel The Incomparable Atuk. Apparently one scene was shot before Kinison demanded re-writes and the production was shut down.	
1989	Gone in 60 Seconds 2	H. B. Halicki	H. B. Halicki	H. B. Halicki	H. B. Halicki, Denice Shakarian	Halicki began filming the sequel to his 1974 film Gone in 60 Seconds during the summer of 1989 but was killed while filming a stunt on August 20, 1989, and the film was never completed.	
1990	Arrive Alive	Jeremiah S. Chechik	Michael O'Donoghue, Mitch Glazer	Art Linson for Paramount Pictures	Willem Dafoe, Joan Cusack	Cancelled by Paramount executives after they watched the first few days of dailies.	
1991	Dylan	David Drury	Jonathan Brett	Patrick Dromgoole	Gary Oldman, Uma Thurman	A biography of Welsh poet Dylan Thomas, the film was shut down after nine days of shooting when Oldman "collapsed on the set," suffering from "nervous exhaustion."	
1991	Sokrovishcha pod Goroy (Сокровища под Горой)	Roman Mitrofanov			Nikolai Karachentsov	An animated fantasy film adaptation of The Hobbit. The project failed due to the dissolution of the Soviet Union and lack of financing.	
1991–1997	Dimension	Lars von Trier	Lars von Trier and Niels Vørsel	Peter Aalbæk Jensen	Jean-Marc Barr, Udo Kier and Stellan Skarsgård	In 1990, it was originally intended to produce only in three and four-minute segments every year for a period of 33 years for a final release in 2024, but Trier lost his enthusiasm for the project due to his struggle in recent works, notably the "Golden Heart" trilogy (consisting of Breaking the Waves, Idioterne, and Dancer in the Dark). In 2010, the filmmaker decided to complete all of the unfinished footage into a short film at the time as the rest of the film's development was abandoned. The short film was released on August 25, 2010.	
1992	Mouche	Marcel Carné	based on Guy de Maupassant's short story	Jacques Quintard	Virginie Ledoyen, Wadeck Stanczak, Roland Lesaffre	Provisionally entitled L'Amour de vivre, financing was withdrawn after only ten days of shooting when the director fell ill. Carné's attempt to "bring [Impressionist painting] to life" failed twice, in the '80s and '90s.	
1992	Sleepaway Camp IV: The Survivor	Jim Markovic	Tom Clohessy	Krishna Shah	Carrie Chambers, Victor Campos, John Lodico	Principal photography commenced in 1992 in upstate New York before being abandoned when the film's production company, Double Helix Films went bankrupt. The film was intended to go into production again in 2004. However, the surviving footage, which runs at a mere 34 minutes, was made available for the first time when released via the original Region 1 DVD trilogy boxset, now out-of-print. Production was never officially completed, but select clips from the first three Sleepaway Camp films were edited together with the footage of The Survivor as "flashback" sequences, and it was released in 2012 as a stand-alone set.	
1993	Dark Blood	George Sluizer	Jim Barton	Daniel Lupi, JoAnne Sellar	River Phoenix, Judy Davis, Jonathan Pryce	Phoenix died during production, after approximately 80% of the film had been shot. In 2012, a cut of the film was screened at several film festivals with director Sluizer providing narration for the scenes that were not shot.	
1997	Broadway Brawler	Lee Grant	unknown	Joseph Feury	Bruce Willis, Maura Tierney, Daniel Baldwin	A sport-themed romantic comedy about a washed up ice-hockey player. Production was halted after 20 days of principal photography due to an acrimonious relationship between Bruce Willis and director Lee Grant and other crew. The financial loss incurred by the production's implosion obliged Willis to take on three roles at reduced salary for the production company: Armageddon, The Sixth Sense, and Disney's The Kid.	
1999	Fight Harm	Harmony Korine	Harmony Korine		Harmony Korine	The premise of the film was to verbally provoke passers-by into a fight. The rules were that Korine couldn't throw the first punch and the person confronted had to be bigger than Korine. To him, Fight Harm was high-comedy reminiscent of Buster Keaton. "I wanted to push humor to extreme limits to demonstrate that there's a tragic component in everything." Filmed in New York, the project was abandoned following the injuries and arrests Korine faced while shooting.	
1999–2000	The Man Who Killed Don Quixote	Terry Gilliam			Jean Rochefort, Johnny Depp	During the first week of shooting, the actor playing Don Quixote (Jean Rochefort) suffered a herniated disc, and a flood severely damaged the set. The film was cancelled, resulting in an insurance claim of US$15 million. The production of the film was the basis of the 2002 documentary Lost in La Mancha, and Gilliam ultimately completed the film nearly two decades later, as 2018's The Man Who Killed Don Quixote.	
2001	Lily and the Secret Planting	Hettie Macdonald	Lucinda Coxon	Sarah Radclyffe	Winona Ryder, Gael Garcia Bernal	Shut down after four days when Winona Ryder was taken to the hospital with "a gastric infection." Kate Winslet was announced as her replacement, but the film was never restarted.	
2002	Svyaznoy (Связной)	Sergei Bodrov Jr.	Sergei Bodrov Jr.	Sergei Bodrov Jr., Siergiej Seljanow	Sergei Bodrov Jr., Anna Dubrovskaya, Alexander Mezentsev	An action film with supernatural elements whose production was interrupted by a glacier Kolka–Karmadon collapse in Karmadon Gorge and the death of the film crew, including director Sergei Bodrov Jr.	
2006	Revenge of the Nerds	Kyle Newman	Gabe Sachs and Jeff Judah, Adam Jay Epstein and Andrew Jacobson, and Adam F. Goldberg		Adam Brody, Dan Byrd, Katie Cassidy, Kristin Cavallari, Jenna Dewan, Chris Marquette, Ryan Pinkston, Efren Ramirez, and Nick Zano	A remake of the first film in the 1980s comedy series was canceled after two weeks of shooting, when Emory University officials read the script and revoked the permission they had given to film; studio executives were disappointed in the dailies.	
2009–2011	Yellow Submarine	Robert Zemeckis			Dean Lennox Kelly, Peter Serafinowicz, Cary Elwes, Adam Campbell, and David Tennant	The CGI remake of the 1968 animated Beatles classic film was cancelled following the closure of ImageMovers Digital and the poor box-office results of that studio's last film Mars Needs Moms. Zemeckis considered shopping the remake around to other studios, before he himself gave up on the project.	
2010–2018	Yume Miru Kikai	Satoshi Kon	Satoshi Kon	Masao Maruyama, Satochi Kon		A fantasy-adventure anime film was produced by Madhouse, Inc. and MAPPA. The production was suspended due to the death of Satoshi Kon. Furthermore, the film was unable to be produced due to a lack of funding and a director. In August 2018, Masao Maruyama decided to abandon work on the film.	
2012–2014	10 Things I Hate About Life	Gil Junger	Jeannette Issa, Gil Junger and Tim McGrath	Andrew Lazar, Tim McGrath and Gary Smith	Evan Rachel Wood, Thomas McDonell, Billy Campbell and Élodie Yung	Production began on the romantic comedy film in 2012. Despite a similar title to popular teen comedy 10 Things I Hate About You, also directed by Junger, the films share no continuity. A third of the film had been shot when it was shut down after Gary Smith abruptly resigned as head of the production company and Wood became pregnant. She returned briefly for an attempt to resume in late 2013, but left soon afterwards, claiming the producers had not raised enough money to pay her for the work she'd already done. A lawsuit against her by the studio remains unresolved and the film as begun will never be finished.	
2013–2014	Midnight Rider	Randall Miller	Randall Miller, Jody Savin	Randall Miller, Jody Savin	William Hurt	Based on the life of musician Gregg Allman, the film was cancelled after camera assistant Sarah Jones was killed and seven others injured by a train while the production was filming a camera test on an active railroad trestle bridge.	
2014–2017	Emperor	Lee Tamahori	Michael Thomas, Jeffrey Hatcher	Paul Breuls	Adrien Brody	An international Belgian-Czech-Dutch production, the action of which was to be transferred to 16th-century Europe engulfed by religious conflicts, and the protagonist was to be a young woman who wants to take revenge on Charles V for the death of her father. The Corsan studio, owned by Adrien Brody, was responsible for the production, and filming took place in the Czech Republic among others in Barrandov Studios and Ghent. The production was canceled after producer Paul Breuls was arrested in Belgium for financial fraud and failure to pay staff and lack of declaration of tax benefits to investors. Studio Corsan was declared bankrupt.	
2015	Wake	John Pogue	Christopher Borrelli		Bruce Willis, Ben Kingsley, Piper Perabo, Cameron Monaghan, Ellen Burstyn	Production on the film shut down after a week of filming due to financial problems. Willis and Pogue left the project due to financial and schedule issues.	
2017–2024	Yuri on Ice the Movie: Ice Adolescence	Sayo Yamamoto	Sayo Yamamoto			A film follow-up for the 2016 anime TV series Yuri on Ice, it was announced in 2017. In 2019, it was announced that the film was delayed. In 2020, a trailer for the film was released. The film was officially cancelled in April 2024.	
2018–2022	Escape from Hat	Mark Osborne	Mark Osborne, Adam Kline	Mark Osborne, Jinko Gotoh, Melissa Cobb		Animated fantasy film based on the children's book of the same name by Adam Kline produced for the Netflix platform. The film was cancelled by Netflix in 2022.	
2018	Nicole & O.J.	Joshua Newton	Joshua Newton		Boris Kodjoe, Charlotte Kirk	Based on the relationship of O. J. Simpson and Nicole Brown Simpson, filming began in 2018 but was never completed.	
2020	Geechee	DuBois Ashong	DuBois Ashong	Jamie Foxx, Stuart Ford, Glendon Palmer, Datari Turner	Amin Joseph, Ebon Moss-Bachrach, Andrea Riseborough, Gavin Warren		
2022	Being Mortal	Aziz Ansari	Aziz Ansari	Aziz Ansari, Youree Henley	Aziz Ansari, Bill Murray, Seth Rogen, Keke Palmer	Filming began in March 2022 on the adaptation of Being Mortal by Atul Gawande. The following month, production was suspended due to a complaint against Murray for allegedly sexually harassing a young female crew member.	
2022	Jana Gana Mana	Puri Jagannadh		Puri Jagannadh, Charmme Kaur, Vamshi Paidipally	Pooja Hegde	A military action film to be released in Telugu and produced by Puri Connects. Filming began in June 2022 in Mumbai but was halted in September of the same year following the financial failure of Liger.	
2022–2024	Vedat Marathe Veer Daudle Saat	Mahesh Manjrekar	Parag Kulkarni	Mahesh Manjrekar, Vaseem Qureshi	Jay Dudhane, Hardeek Joshi, Akshay Kumar, Satya Manjrekar, Vishal Nikam, Utkarsha Shinde, Pravin Tarde	A historical drama in Marathi that told the story of seven legendary warriors of the Maratha Empire who tried to regain independence in 1674. Filming began in December 2022, but during filming, a crew member fell from the fortifications at Panhala Fort and died. Furthermore, the film faced resistance from Suresh Gujara and residents of Satara district, who objected to the creation of fictional characters for the film. After completing half of the film's shooting, the film was halted in June 2024 due to financial problems related to the high budget.	

== Films abandoned during post-production or completed and never released ==
Films that completed principal photography, or in the case of animated films, after most animation had been completed, but were abandoned during the post-production phase or were completed and never released.

Year of production	Film	Director	Screenwriter	Producer	Cast	Notes	Ref
1926	A Woman of the Sea	Josef von Sternberg	Josef von Sternberg	Charlie Chaplin	Charlie Chaplin	The film was completed, and given a preview screening, but Chaplin was unsatisfied with it and destroyed all known copies in front of witnesses as a tax write-off in 1933.	
1927	The American	J. Stuart Blackton	Marian Constance Blackton	George K. Spoor	Bessie Love, Charles Ray	Upon viewing the film, which had been made using the experimental Natural Vision process, producer Spoor decided the production was so bad that he would not release it.	
1939	Bogurodzica	Jan Fethke, Henryk Korewicki	Edward Puchalski, Ferdynand Goetel		Maria Bogda, Tekla Trapszo, Adam Brodzisz	A sequel to the Pod Twoją obronęmovie about story the Józio, who steals his father's plane to fly to London on an important mission, which crashes into the North Sea. Due to the German invasion of Poland, the film's premiere was canceled.	
1939	Inżynier Szeruda	Józef Lejtes				A film about miners living in the Polish part of Silesia. Filming was completed in the summer of 1939, and the premiere was scheduled for the fall of the same year. The premiere never took place due to the German invasion of Poland.	
1939	Nad Niemnem	Wanda Jakubowska, Jerzy Zarzycki	Jarosław Iwaszkiewicz	Spółdzielnia Autorów Filmowych	Elżbieta Barszczewska, Jerzy Pichelski, Bogusław Samborski, Mieczysława Ćwiklińska, Ludwik Sempoliński	Completed drama film based on novel Eliza Orzeszkowa of the same name, scheduled for premiere on September 5, 1939, which did not take place due to the German invasion of Poland. However, the German occupiers planned to release the film on the condition that it be remade into anti-Polish propaganda about German settlers oppressed by Poles, set in East Prussia. The remake never took place, and the film's alter ego, Stefan Dękierewski, intercepted the tapes and, in the winter of 1939, in consultation with Wanda Jakubowska, decided to hide the film, which was bricked up in the basement of the WSM buildings in Żoliborz. The film was split into two or more negatives.	
1939	Serce Batiara	Michał Waszyński	Emanuel Szlechter, Ludwik Starski	K.S Popławski	Henryk Vogelfänger, Kazimierz Wajda, Ina Benita	A musical comedy about the Lviv batiars. The production was interrupted by the German invasion of Poland starting World War II. The finished film material was burned during the bombing of Warsaw in 1939.	
1939	Szatan z siódmej klasy	Konrad Tom	Eugeniusz Bunda, Kornel Makuszyński, Konrad Tom	As-Film	Wanda Bartówna, Mieczysława Ćwiklińska, Jerzy Kaliszewski	A comedy-adventure film based on the novella of the same title. The production could not be completed due to German invasion of Poland starting world war II.	
1944–1945	Kamerad Hedwig	Gerhard Lamprecht	Toni Huppertz, Ulrich Erfurth, Luise Ullrich	Karl Ritter	Luise Ullrich, Wolfgang Lukschy, Emil Heß, Otto Wernicke, Ilse Fürstenberg, Ullrich Haupt, Franz Weber	A film about a widow that explores the issue of working women. The film was not completed until Germany capitulated.	
1966–1969	The Deep	Orson Welles	Orson Welles		Jeanne Moreau, Laurence Harvey, Orson Welles	Welles filmed The Deep, an adaptation of the novel Dead Calm, but abandoned the film. A rough edit was assembled by the Munich Film Archive and screened in 2015.	
1972	The Day the Clown Cried	Jerry Lewis	Jerry Lewis	Nat Wachsberger	Jerry Lewis	Filming completed in 1972 and a rough cut was made, but the film was never released due to various disputes. The film was met with controversy regarding its premise and content, which features a circus clown who is imprisoned in a Nazi concentration camp. Lewis submitted an incomplete print to the Library of Congress under an agreement it not be screened until 2024.	
1979–1980s	Street of Dreams	Martin Sharp	N/A	Martin Sharp	Tiny Tim	Documentary about the life of Tiny Tim and the 1979 Sydney Ghost Train fire at Luna Park Sydney. Haunted by the subject matter and all the perceived theological connections and synchronicities, Sharp worked obsessively on the film but never finished it during his lifetime. A rough cut was released in 1988 for the purpose of film festival screenings only.	
1991–1992	Genghis Khan	Ken Annakin	James Carrington	Enzo Rispoli	Richard Tyson, Charlton Heston, Pat Morita, Julia Nickson-Soul	Ran out of funds, Dissolution of the Soviet Union	
1992–1993	The Fantastic Four	Oley Sassone	Craig J. Nevius, Kevin Rock	Steven Rabiner	Alex Hyde-White, Jay Underwood, Rebecca Staab, Michael Bailey Smith, Carl Ciarfalio, Ian Trigger, Joseph Culp, Kat Green, George Gaynes	Filming completed in 1993 and a Labor Day weekend release was planned before being pushed to January 19, 1994, only to be cancelled at the last minute. The film's reels were confiscated and cease and desist letters were sent to the cast to halt marketing. Franchise creator Stan Lee claimed that the film was an ashcan production that was never meant to be released in the first place.	
1996	Scenes for the Soul	George Tillman Jr.	George Tillman Jr.	George Jackson, Doug McHenry	Johnny 'Koolout' Starks, George Brashear, Felipe Camacho, Jaqueline Fleming, Mel Jackson, Marcia Wright	In 1994, George Tillman Jr. was slated to make his directorial debut with Scenes for the Soul for Savoy Pictures and Jackson McHenry Entertainment, with a cast of unknown talent, and after test screenings, the film never got released.	
1997–2002	Daybreak	Randal Atamaniuk	Randal Atamaniuk	Randal Atamaniuk	Collin Doyle, Aaron Talbot, Cameron McLay, José DeSousa, Darcy Shaw	Principal photography was completed in 1997 and a final cut assembled in 2002, but was never finished or screened due to insufficient funds for post production, and has never been released.	
2002	The Cruelest Winter	Carroll Ballard	David Assael			The film, about a group of sled dog drivers who set out to save Nome, Alaska from a diphtheria epidemic, completed principal photography in 2002 but never released due to failure to find distribution.	
2002	In God's Hands	Lodge Kerrigan	Lodge Kerrigan	Steven Soderbergh	Maggie Gyllenhaal, Peter Sarsgaard	The film completed principal photography, but the entire project had to be abandoned due to irreparable damage to the negative.	
2004	Big Bug Man	Bob Bendetson, Peter Shin	Bob Bendetson		Brendan Fraser, Marlon Brando, Michael Madsen	The animated film was planned for release between 2006 and 2008. It was Brando's final performance before his death in July 2004.	
2007–2016	Empires of the Deep	Michael French, Jonathan Lawrence, Scott Miller	Jon Jiang, Randall Frakes	Jon Jiang, Harrison Liang	Olga Kurylenko		
2007	Hippie Hippie Shake	Beeban Kidron	Lee Hall	Tim Bevan	Cillian Murphy, Sienna Miller	Based on the memoir of the same name by Richard Neville, the film was shot in 2007 and a rough cut was test screened, but director Kidron left the project during post-production and the film was never released.	
2008	Queen of Media	Furqaan Clover	Kimba Henriques, Furqaan Clover	Richard Miller	Robin Givens, Oliver "Power" Grant	Based on Wendy Williams' biography Wendy's Got the Heat, the film was shot in 2008 with a $3 million budget, but was never released.	
2008–2009	Black Water Transit	Tony Kaye	Matthew Chapman		Laurence Fishburne, Karl Urban	Budgeted at $23 million, the film was shot in 2008 and a rough cut was screened, but it was never completed due to financial and legal disputes.	
2009	Banda Yeh Bindaas Hai	Ravi Chopra	Ravi Chopra	Ravi Chopra	Lara Dutta, Govinda, Boman Irani, Tabu	An unauthorized remake of My Cousin Vinny in Hindi, which was scheduled for release in 2009, was blocked by 20th Century Fox while in post-production due to copyright infringement on My Cousin Vinny, for which the studio sought compensation. Ultimately 20th Century Fox obtained compensation from BR Films, and the film never saw an official release.	
2010	Prankstar	Tom Green	Tom Green	Katy Wallin	Tom Green	The mockumentary written by, directed by, and starring Tom Green was completed in 2010 and announced for release later than year, but never materialized.	
2011–2012	The Power of Zhu/The Secret of Zhu/Journey to GloE					Cepia LLC created The Dream Garden Company for 4 films with distribution by Universal Pictures. On September 27, 2011, the ZhuZhu Pets franchise first full-length feature film Quest for Zhu was released straight-to-DVD. A second full-length feature film, The Power of Zhu, probably in the works and has a trailer, potentially being released on DVD sometime in 2012 as well as a third film The Secret of Zhu that featured the voices of Brad Garrett and Ken Jeong and fourth film Journey to GloE. However, as of February 2014, no other films or even plans for films have been released for The Power of Zhu, although it was completed and was "secretly distributed" to TV stations in France and Brazil under the title Amazing Adventures of Zhu.	
2010s	Poe	Michael Sporn				Animator Michael Sporn was producing and directing an animated feature based the life of Edgar Allan Poe when he died in January 2014.	
2012–2015	B.O.O.: Bureau of Otherworldly Operations	Tony Leondis			Matt Bomer, Jennifer Coolidge, Rashida Jones, Bill Murray, Seth Rogen, Octavia Spencer	The film was announced by DreamWorks in early 2009 and was intended to be an animated film about the titular agency, whose mission was to protect the Earth from a ghost invasion, whose members, the B.O.O. organization, are themselves ghosts. Production began in 2012, with a planned June 2015 release, which was previously postponed several times. Due to financial difficulties stemming from Mr. Peabody & Sherman release losses and unsuccessful deals related to the studio's share price reduction, production was canceled in January 2015.	
2012	Killing Winston Jones	Joel David Moore	Justin Trevor Winters	Albert Sandoval, Daemon Hillin, Tom Somerset, Peter Winther	Danny Glover, Richard Dreyfuss, Jon Heder, Danny Masterson	The dark comedy was shot in late 2012 and was originally scheduled to be released in theaters in 2014. However, no release was announced and the studio has not made any statements about the film since 2014. The release was reportedly cancelled due to the rape allegations and criminal trial against Danny Masterson, who plays a prominent role.	
2015	The Long Home	James Franco	Vince Jolivett, Steve Janas	James Franco, Vince Jolivett, Jay Davis	James Franco, Josh Hutcherson, Tim Blake Nelson, Courtney Love, Timothy Hutton, Giancarlo Esposito, Ashton Kutcher, Josh Hartnett	Filmed in 2015 and planned for release in 2017, it has yet to be released in any format as of 2026.	
2015	The Three-Body Problem	Zhang Fanfan			Feng Shaofeng, Zhang Jingchu	Filmed in 2015. Not released as of 2026, allegedly due to problems with the film's visual effects.	
2016	El Señor de la Sierra	Alejandro Irias		Alejandro Irias	Jefferson Sierra	Based on the historical novel of the same name, written by Ramon Amaya. The film was set during the conquest of Honduras, focusing on the life of the indigenous leader Lempira. The film was completed, however, there were delays in its release in national theaters of its country of origin. Currently there is not much information due to its delayed release, although the lack of a release date could be attributed to a lack of budget.	
2016	Second Blood	Fawzi Al-Khatib	Shehab Al-Fadhli, Fayez Hussein Ali	Mohammed AlSayed, Mehdi Boushahri, Mohamed Al Mubarak	Abdulhadi Al-Khayat, Ranaa Ghandour, Khaled Al-Buraiki, Mojeb Al-Qabandi	A Kuwaiti action film described as a Rambo: First Blood Part II rip-off. It stars bodybuilding champion Abdulhadi Al-Khayat as Yousef Rambu. Reports about the availability of Second Blood vary depending on the sources. The movie was supposed to be released in several Asian countries on VOD and in a few theaters, given a very limited distribution (in late 2016). At the same time, on the IMDb website, the film currently has no dedicated votes.	
2016–2017	Elizabeth, Michael & Marlon	Ben Palmer	Neil Forsyth		Joseph Fiennes, Brian Cox, Stockard Channing	The film, based on an urban legend of Michael Jackson, Marlon Brando and Elizabeth Taylor embarking on a road trip to Ohio following the September 11 attacks, was shot in 2016. It was an episode of the British TV series Urban Myths, but never aired due to controversy surrounding white actor Fiennes playing Jackson.	
2017	Gore	Michael Hoffman	Andy Paterson	Michael Hoffman, Jay Parini	Kevin Spacey, Michael Stuhlbarg, Douglas Booth	Based on Jay Parini's biography of Gore Vidal, Empire of Self: A Life of Gore Vidal, the film was in post-production when Netflix decided to cancel it following the sexual assault allegations against Kevin Spacey.	
2019	Klecha	Jacek Gwizdała	Wojciech Pestka, Janusz Petelski, Jacek Gwizdała	Andrzej Stachecki, Jacek Gwizdała	Mirosław Baka, Marcin Bosak	A biographical and historical film about the activities of priest Roman Kotlarz, including the June 1976 protests. The movie was supposed to be a promotion for the region and the city of Radom. Due to the bankruptcy of the producer and lack of funds, the film was not completed.	
2020	Kukuriraige: Sanxingdui Fantasy	Fumikazu Satou	Huang Jun		Marie Miyake	A Japanese/Chinese animated co-production, the film was originally intended to be released on February 27, 2020, alongside the short film Jewelpet Attack Travel!, but was postponed indefinitely due to production issues. As of 2022, there are no plans to release the film at any point in the foreseeable future.	
2021–2024	The Mothership	Matt Charman	Matt Charman	Fred Berger	Halle Berry, Molly Parker, Omari Hardwick	Netflix cancelled the release of the film due to post-production difficulties.	
2021–2022	Batgirl	Adil El Arbi, Bilall Fallah	Christina Hodson	Kristin Burr	Leslie Grace, J. K. Simmons, Jacob Scipio, Brendan Fraser, Michael Keaton	The film was originally intended to be released on streaming platform HBO Max, with discussions internally about potentially giving the film a theatrical release, especially with the film's estimated $90 million budget. The film was in post-production and had been test screened when Warner Bros. Discovery decided to shelve the film, stating that it would not be released in theaters nor on streaming platforms and saying that the film "simply did not work" and went against the new desire and mandate from CEO David Zaslav to make DC films "big theatrical event films".	
2022	Scoob! Holiday Haunt	Bill Haller, Michael Kurinsky	Tony Cervone, Paul Dini	Tony Cervone, Mitchell Ferm	Frank Welker, Andre Braugher	A prequel to 2020's Scoob!, the film was in late stages of post-production and scheduled for a December 2022 release on HBO Max when Warner Bros. Discovery cancelled its release.	
2024	Jodie				Tracee Ellis Ross (voice)	MTV Entertainment Studios shelved the completed television film in March 2024 instead of airing it on Comedy Central. The company has let the creators attempt to shop it to other studios.	
2025	Golden	Michel Gondry	Martin Hynes	Pharrell Williams	Kelvin Harrison Jr., Halle Bailey, Da'Vine Joy Randolph, Brian Tyree Henry, Quinta Brunson, Janelle Monáe, Jaboukie Young-White, Tim Meadows, Anderson .Paak, Missy Elliott, André 3000, Jamilah Rosemond, Jayson Lee	Initially scheduled to be released on May 9, 2025, the film was canceled during post-production by Universal Pictures after $20 million had been spent shooting it, as well as disagreements with the producers. Variety reported in February 2025 that the film was permanently shelved and will not be released. It will also not be offered to other studios for completion or distribution.	

== List of rescued films ==
Year of release	Film	Production Phase	Director	Notes	Ref
1946	Czarne diamenty	Released	Jerzy Gabryelski	The premiere of the film was planned on March 15, 1939, which did not take place after the film was blocked by Józef Lejtes, as he was working on a film with a similar plot Inżynier Szeruda based on novel Gustaw Morcinek on same title. The premiere was planned for September 1939, but it was postponed due to the outbreak of World War II. After the war ended film premiered on August 12, 1946.	
1963	Passenger	Released	Andrzej Munk, Witold Lesiewicz	Director Andrzej Munk died in a car accident while the film was being edited. The finished film was edited by Witold Lasiewicz, whose premiere took place on September 20, 1963, on the second anniversary of Munk's death.	
1988	On the Silver Globe	Limited release	Andrzej Żuławski	In 1977, production was halted by Deputy Minister of Culture and Art Janusz Wilhelmi, who failed to personally inform Żuławski, and the sets and costumes were ordered to be burned. Due to difficulties finding producers in Europe who could complete the film, the American studio Orion Pictures was approached. However, Ministerstwo Kultury i Sztuki postponed the decision to sell the rights to avoid embarrassment if the film were completed. Żuławski shot additional scenes in Warsaw and Kraków, adding commentary about the missing scenes. Ultimately, the unfinished version of the film premiered at the 1988 on Cannes Film Festival.	
2012	Dark Blood	Limited release	George Sluizer	River Phoenix died during production in 1993, after approximately 80% of the film had been shot. In 2012, a cut of the film was screened at several film festivals with director Sluizer providing narration for the scenes that were not shot.	
2016	Chief Zabu	Limited release	Zack Norman, Neil Kohen		
2018	The Other Side of the Wind	Released	Orson Welles	Orson Welles had directed the film between 1970 and 1976 and was intended to be his American directional comeback. Welles kept working on the project periodically into the 1980s, but it was never finished due to political, legal, and financial issues. Welles died in 1985, but there have been multiple attempts to recreate the incomplete movie. In 2014, Royal Road completed the film after acquisition and it was released in 2018.	
2020	Grizzly II: Revenge	Released	André Szöts	A sequel to 1976's Grizzly starring Louise Fletcher and John Rhys-Davies in major roles with early career appearances by Charlie Sheen, George Clooney, and Laura Dern. Production began in 1983 but halted when producer Joseph Ford Proctor fled location filming in Hungary after the first day of shooting, which left the film without funding. Enough money was obtained by co-producers to complete filming, but no completion funds were available until 2020.	
2021	Mad God	Released	Phil Tippett	In 1990, visual effects artist Phil Tippett wrote and began filming the stop-motion film Mad God. While working on Jurassic Park, he became convinced that CGI would render stop-motion animation obsolete, and shelved the project. Beginning in 2012, he resumed work on the film, with the help of crews of volunteers. It was released in 2021.	
2023	Nimona	Released	Nick Bruno and Troy Quane	The film was initially meant to release in 2022, but was cancelled after The Walt Disney Company shut down Blue Sky Studios, which they acquired through their purchase of 20th Century Fox, even though 75% of the movie was complete. However, Netflix saved the movie - purchasing, finishing, and releasing it in 2023. It went on to be nominated for Best Animated Feature at the Critics' Choice, Annie Awards and Academy Awards.	
2026	Coyote vs. Acme	Released	Dave Green	The film was originally set to be released theatrically by Warner Bros. Pictures and scheduled for July 21, 2023. It was later delayed, with Barbie taking its original release date. On November 9, 2023, Warner Bros. Discovery announced that the film had been shelved in order to obtain a tax write-off. However, following public backlash, the company allowed the film to be shopped to other distributors. On March 31, 2025, it was announced that Ketchup Entertainment had acquired the rights to distribute the film, which released theatrically on August 28, 2026.	
2026	Mariette in Ecstasy	Released	John Bailey	Filming was completed in 1995, and a release in 1996, but it was cancelled due to Savoy Pictures' financial troubles. The director saved the lone 35mm copy of the film and eventually released in the 2019 Camerimage International Film Festival. The film was finally released on October 30, 2026 digitally.	

== Most expensive abandoned films ==
The most expensive films with information available from reliable sources regarding how much money had been spent on the film when it was abandoned.

Year of production	Film	Loss	Inflation Adjusted Loss (2025 US dollars)	State when abandoned	Studio	Ref
2022	Batgirl	$90 million	$105 million	Post-production	Warner Bros.	
2024	The Mothership	$40 million	$46.8 million	Post-production	Netflix	
2022	Scoob! Holiday Haunt	$40 million	$46.8 million	Completed	Warner Bros.	
2017	Gore	$39 million	$50.3 million	Post-production	Netflix	
1999–2000	The Man Who Killed Don Quixote	$32 million	$56.8 million	Filming	Various	
1996–1998	Superman Lives	$30 million	$55.2 million	Pre-production	Warner Bros.	
1991–1992	Genghis Khan	$30 million	$61.7 million	Post-production	International Cinema Co	

== See also ==
- Development hell
- List of lost films
- List of incomplete or partially lost films
- List of rediscovered films

== Bibliography ==
- Clark, Al (1983). The Film Year Book. Grove Press, an Evergreen book.
- Richardson, Tony (1993). The Long-Distance Runner: An Autobiography. William Morrow and Company. ISBN 9780688121013.
