= Lucy Barzun Donnelly =

American film producer

- Education: Georgetown University (BA)
- Occupation: Film Producer
- Notable work: Grey Gardens
- Relatives: Matthew Barzun (brother) Jacques Barzun (grandfather)

Lucy Barzun Donnelly is an American executive producer, including Grey Gardens.

She is the sister of Matthew Barzun and the granddaughter of Jacques Barzun. She graduated from Georgetown University in 1995.

Donnelly is a film and television producer based in London. She began her career by developing and co-producing Peter Hedges' Academy Award nominated Pieces of April with John Lyons and InDigEnt which premiered at Sundance starring Katie Holmes, Oliver Platt, Patricia Clarkson and Alison Pill. Under her films banner, she produced the critically acclaimed Sundance darling, The Go-Getter by writer-director Martin Hynes, starring Zooey Deschanel, Jena Malone and Lou Taylor Pucci, which was released theatrically in June 2008, garnering acclaim from top critics at The New York Times, New York Magazine, Rolling Stone, and Variety.

She formed Locomotive with veteran producer Joshua Astrachan in 2007, where she developed and produced Grey Gardens with Rachael Horovitz and Michael Sucsy for HBO Films. Grey Gardens is a drama based on the real lives of Edith Bouvier Beale, made famous by Albert and David Maysles documentary of the same name. The film stars Jessica Lange, who won an Emmy for her performance and Drew Barrymore, who won both a Screen Actors Guild award and a Golden Globe for her portrayal of the troubled Little Edie. Donnelly was awarded an Emmy.

Under the Locomotive Banner, Lucy produced A Bag of Hammers, starring Jason Ritter, Jake Sandvig and Rebecca Hall. The film premiered at the 2011 South by Southwest Film Festival and is set to be released theatrically by MPI Media Group in August 2011. A Bag of Hammers was directed by Brian Crano from a screenplay he wrote with actor Jake Sandvig. In it, Sandvig and Jason Ritter play slacker buddies who run a valet-parking scam to steal cars. Their operation is threatened when a stressed-out single mom Carrie Preston moves in next door with her street-smart young son Chandler Canterbury.
