= Golden (unfinished film) =

Unreleased film by Michel Gondry

- Directed by: Michel Gondry
- Written by: Martin Hynes
- Produced by: Pharrell Williams; Mimi Valdés; Gil Netter
- Cinematography: Lachlan Milne
- Edited by: Christopher Tellefsen
- Music by: Heitor Pereira
- Production companies: I Am Other; Partizan Films; Netter Films
- Distributed by: Universal Pictures
- Country: United States
- Language: English
- Budget: ≈$20 million

Golden is an unreleased American coming-of-age musical comedy-drama film directed by Michel Gondry, written by Martin Hynes, and co-produced by Pharrell Williams. Set in 1977, the film drew inspiration from Virginia Beach's Atlantis Apartments. The cast included Kelvin Harrison Jr., Halle Bailey, Da'Vine Joy Randolph, Brian Tyree Henry, Quinta Brunson, Janelle Monáe, Jaboukie Young-White, Tim Meadows, Anderson .Paak, Missy Elliott, Andre 3000, Brian Elliott, Jamilah Rosemond, and Jayson Lee.

Golden was scheduled to be released in the United States by Universal Pictures on May 9, 2025. However, in February 2025, Variety reported that the film was permanently shelved after $20 million was spent by the studio and would not be released, citing disagreements with the producers during post-production, with the film not being offered to other studios for completion and distribution.

== Cast ==
- Kelvin Harrison Jr.
- Halle Bailey
- Da'Vine Joy Randolph
- Brian Tyree Henry
- Quinta Brunson
- Janelle Monáe
- Jaboukie Young-White
- Tim Meadows
- Anderson .Paak
- Missy Elliott
- André 3000
- Brian Elliott
- Jamilah Rosemond
- Jayson Lee

== Production ==
On March 27, 2017, it was announced that 20th Century Fox was developing a musical film titled Atlantis, which is inspired by Virginia Beach's Atlantis Apartments. Michael Mayer, who would later move to an executive producer position, was set to direct, Martin Hynes was set to write the screenplay, and Williams, Mimi Valdés and Gil Netter were set to produce.

No further updates on the project were announced until March 21, 2024, when Michel Gondry replaced Mayer as the director of the then-untitled film, which moved to Universal Pictures. Steven Levenson was revealed to have written the screenplay with Hynes, and Kelvin Harrison Jr. and Da'Vine Joy Randolph were cast to lead the film. In the following months, Halle Bailey, Brian Tyree Henry, and Missy Elliott were cast in April, Janelle Monáe, Tim Meadows, Jaboukie Young-White, Jamilah Rosemond, and Jayson Lee were cast in May, and Quinta Brunson and Anderson .Paak were cast in June.

Filming began in June 2024 in Virginia Beach, Virginia, where the pier was closed to the public for the shoot, and the cast was seen in 1970s attire. On August 29, 2024, the original title of Atlantis was confirmed for the film. In November 2024, the film had been retitled to Golden. In December 2024, Hynes received sole credit for the screenplay from the Writers Guild of America, with Levenson receiving an offscreen "Additional Literary Material" credit.

=== Music ===
On August 29, 2024, it was announced that Pharrell Williams would be writing songs for the film alongside Benj Pasek and Justin Paul.

== Cancellation ==
On August 29, 2024, Universal Pictures set Golden to be released in the United States on May 9, 2025. However, in February 2025, its release was officially cancelled after $20 million was spent on it with the studio having no plans to sell it to other studios for completion and distribution. The reported cause for the cancellation was a "unanimous agreement" between Gondry and producers Williams, Mimi Valdés and Gil Netter, stating that the film "did not live up" to their expectations.

== See also ==
- List of abandoned and unfinished films
