= The Go-Getter (2007 film) =

- Theatrical release poster
- Directed by: Martin Hynes
- Written by: Martin Hynes
- Produced by: Lucy Barzun Donnelly; Lori Christopher; Larry Furlong
- Starring: Lou Taylor Pucci; Zooey Deschanel; Jena Malone; Maura Tierney
- Cinematography: Byron Shah
- Edited by: David Birdsell
- Music by: M. Ward
- Distributed by: Peace Arch Entertainment
- Release dates: January 22, 2007 (Sundance Film Festival); June 6, 2008 (United States)
- Running time: 93 minutes
- Country: United States
- Language: English
- Box office: $11,931

The Go-Getter is a 2007 American independent road film directed and written by Martin Hynes. The film stars Lou Taylor Pucci, Zooey Deschanel, and Jena Malone. In the film, 19-year-old Mercer (Pucci) steals a stranger's car to embark on a road trip to find his estranged brother and tell him that their mother has died. He communicates with the car's owner, Kate (Deschanel), via her cell phone while he travels.

The story was based partially on Hynes's own experiences. After his mother died, and his marriage ended, he took a road trip of his own and wrote "different things," some of which came together in the script for The Go-Getter. Before production began, Hynes and three other crew members traveled to almost every location visited in the film to perform a test shoot, trying various filming styles and techniques. Filming took place between October and November 2005 in Oregon, Nevada, California, and Mexico. Singer and guitarist M. Ward provided most of the music for the film, complemented by songs from The Black Keys, Elliott Smith, The Replacements, and Animal Collective.

The Go-Getter debuted on January 22, 2007, at the Sundance Film Festival and was given a limited theatrical release on June 6, 2008, by Peace Arch Entertainment. Its run lasted just three days, and it grossed only US$11,931. Critics were divided in reaction to the film; some praised the performances, the dialogue and the cinematography, while others thought it was unoriginal, forgettable, and poorly acted.

== Plot ==
One ordinary day, 19-year-old Mercer White steals a Volvo station wagon from a car wash, and leaves Eugene, Oregon to find his estranged half-brother Arlen, who is unaware that their mother has recently died. Soon after leaving, a cell phone in the car rings, and Mercer finds himself talking to the owner of the car, Kate, who lends him her car on the condition that he calls regularly to describe his trip to her.

Mercer travels to a bohemian pottery-making commune in Shelter Cove, California where Arlen once lived, but learns that he moved to Reno, Nevada. He passes through Fallon, Nevada to meet up with the seductive Joely, his middle school crush. In Reno, they take ecstasy and almost have sex before Mercer resumes his search for Arlen. Later he finds himself on the set of a pornographic film, where the director tells him that Arlen left to work at a pet store in Sacramento, California. Joely asks Mercer if he can drive her cousin Buddy and his friend Rid to Mojave, California, where they are building their own car. While driving, Mercer finds Kate's YMCA card in the trunk of her car and, now knowing what she looks like, describes a dream to her in which he, Joely, and Kate are dancing in a re-enactment of Bande à part's dance sequence. Not wanting to get sidetracked, he tries to leave the others behind in a motel room, but when Buddy threatens to steal the car, Mercer tells him that the car belongs to his girlfriend, and Buddy, Rid, and Joely leave without Mercer in Kate's car. He hitchhikes to Mojave and finds the salvage yard where Buddy and Rid are working, and retrieves the car.

Mercer talks to Kate while driving, imagining her sitting in the back seat of the car, but she hangs up in jealousy when he mentions Joely for the first time. He arrives in Sacramento and finds the pet store where Arlen worked. The owner asks Mercer to sing in her children's band, for which she plays as part of her probation. When he returns to the car, he finds somebody trying to break into it, only to discover that it is Kate. They spend the night at a hotel, but he leaves without her the next morning and catches a train to Los Angeles, California. With the help of a translator, he phones Arlen's last residence and learns from a Hispanic woman that Arlen is working at a hotel in Ensenada, Mexico. Mercer finally meets Arlen at the hotel in Ensenada, but Arlen assumes Mercer is just there for money. Enraged, Mercer tackles his brother to the ground and gets kicked off the premises. Kate later finds a bloody Mercer sitting on the side of a road and takes him to a hotel. She tells him that she let him take her car because she was attracted to him, and they have sex. The next day Mercer meets with Arlen again, more amicably, and tells him that he and Kate are driving to Louisiana to spread his mother's ashes.

== Cast ==
- Lou Taylor Pucci as Mercer
- Zooey Deschanel as Kate
- Jena Malone as Joely
- Judy Greer as Better Than Toast
- Julio Oscar Mechoso as Leone
- Colin Fickes as Buddy
- William Lee Scott as Rid
- Bill Duke as Liquor Supply
- Maura Tierney as Pets
- Jsu Garcia as Arlen
- M. Ward as J
- Nick Offerman as Nick the Potter/Dutch the Trumpeter/Joaquin

== Production ==
=== Development ===
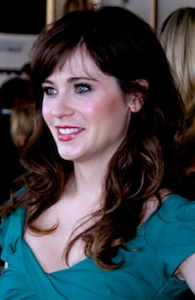
Zooey Deschanel was cast against her previous types as a "glamour girl"

Writer-director Martin Hynes referred to the film as "very uncomfortably autobiographical". He had learned that his mother was diagnosed with cancer when making his 1999 film The Big Split. His marriage ended soon after his mother died, which Hynes saw as "a huge amount of loss". After deciding that "I have to do less," he took a road trip, spending much of his time writing as he traveled. He wrote "really different things", some of which were pieced together and led to his script for The Go-Getter, which he wrote in 2004. Within six months of the script's completion, producer Lucy Barzun Donnelly had raised the entire budget of the film without any actors attached at the time.

Barzun Donnelly recommended to Hynes that he consider Lou Taylor Pucci for the lead role of Mercer, believing that he was "perfect". Hynes watched Pucci's 2005 film Thumbsucker and thought that "We'd be so lucky to have him." He contacted Pucci about the role but was leaving for Norway in less than a week to attend a friend's wedding and wanted to meet with him before leaving. Pucci was in San Francisco on a press tour and Hynes flew from Los Angeles to have lunch with him. Hynes said of the meeting, "I think we really [got] each other," and Pucci accepted the role a week later. Jena Malone signed on to portray Joely because she "loved the script" and was keen to play "a woman on the cusp of learning to toy with her [...] sexual manipulation"; she only later learned that Hynes had written the role with her in mind, having previously worked with her on the short film Al as in Al. Hynes said that Zooey Deschanel, Maura Tierney, and Bill Duke each joined the cast because they "read [the script] and really liked it". He made a deliberate attempt to cast Deschanel and Malone against their previous types. He described Deschanel as a "glamour girl" and Malone as a sexually mature woman.

=== Filming ===
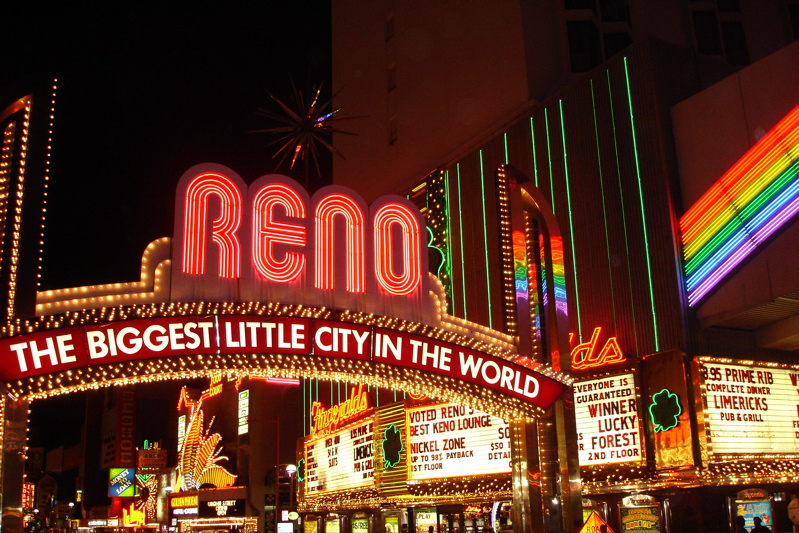
A scene with Pucci and Malone was filmed at the Reno Arch.

Four months before filming began, Hynes asked Barzun Donnelly to set US$20,000–25,000 aside from the film's budget so that he could perform a test shoot. Hynes, cinematographer Byron Shah, a camera assistant, and a stand-in for Mercer—as Pucci had not yet been cast—traveled to every location in the film except for Mexico. Over 2,000 miles (3,200 km), they shot 8,000 feet (2,400 m) of film, testing different filters, lenses, film stocks, and shooting styles. Hynes wrote an 85-page shot list, "scop[ing] out" the entire film. He called the test shoot an "incredible boon" and remarked that "Not one frame of it ended up on the movie, but it paid for itself time and time again." After returning to Los Angeles, he visited each of the locations (including Mexico) again with the principal and technical crews.

Principal photography began in mid-October 2005 and continued through November over a total period of 25 days. The film was shot in sequence, with production starting in Eugene, Oregon and then moving to Reno, Nevada and subsequently Ensenada, Mexico. Hynes called the filming "a high-wire act the whole way", and said that one of the biggest challenges was transporting the crew of 40 from Oregon to Mexico, sometimes changing locations twice a day with few hours of daylight. A crew member lost the project's Filming Permit on the last day of shooting in Mexico, and filming at rush hour was halted by the police. Hynes took a smaller camera to film several blocks away from the original set, but the second assistant director soon arrived warning that the police were coming and that they would be taken to prison because they did not have the paperwork for filming. Hynes and the crew "scatter[ed]", leaving Pucci alone further down the street, which Hynes claims is his strangest experience in the film industry. The crew later returned to Los Angeles to shoot final scenes and to commence post-production.

=== Music ===
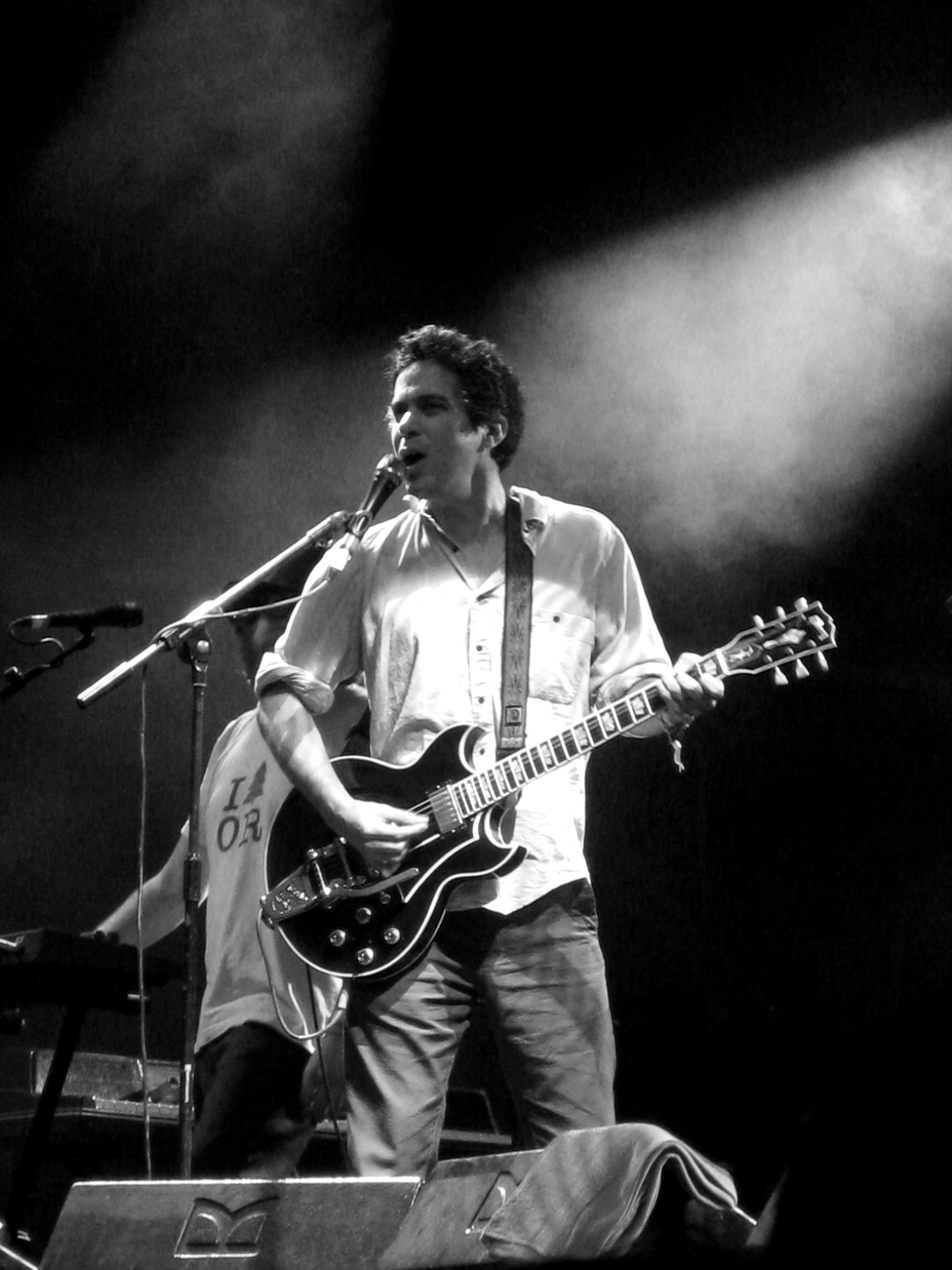
Hynes described M. Ward's music as "Mercer's sound".

When searching for the film's music, one of the producers suggested to Hynes that he go to a Bright Eyes concert. Singer and guitarist M. Ward opened the show as a supporting act, and Hynes recalled thinking, "Holy shit! That's the guy. That's it. He's perfect!" Hynes sent an unsolicited script of the film to Ward, who read it and signed on to the project when there was no financing behind the film nor any actors attached. He told Hynes that any of his songs could be used in the film; Hynes said that, in post-production, he tested every one of Ward's songs, including instrumental versions, in the final cut. In the beginning of the film, Mercer comes across a band; Hynes had always intended for whichever song they were playing to become the overture of the film. Ward's song "Vincent O'Brien" became that overture, and described the continuous presence of Ward's music as "a reminder of home". He decided that when Joely entered "it was right to step away from Mercer's sound—M. Ward—and [convey] that this movie has been overtaken by forces outside his control," using The Black Keys' "10 A.M. Automatic" and "Keep Me" in addition to The Replacements' "Color Me Impressed". Hynes was able to obtain, at a low cost, "Banshee Beat" by Animal Collective and the late Elliott Smith's song "Coast to Coast", after writing a "heartfelt letter" to Smith's mother and sister, his main estate holders.

He also used "A Mighty Fortress Is Our God" by novelty singer Corn Mo at the insistence of Nick Offerman, who plays three minor roles in the film. The Portland Youth Jazz Orchestra All Stars plays Ward's "One Life Away" as an "old-timey instrumental" for one of Mercer's dreams, an homage to a dancing sequence seen in Jean-Luc Godard's 1964 film Bande à part. For the closing credits, Ward and Zooey Deschanel recorded a duet cover of "When I Get to the Border" from Richard and Linda Thompson's 1974 album I Want to See the Bright Lights Tonight. The pair found themselves "mutually charmed", according to The New York Times' Melena Ryzik, and bonded over similar musical interests. After Ward listened to Deschanel's demos, they paired up and formed the band She & Him. Pitchfork Media reported in April 2007 of a future The Go-Getter soundtrack to be released by Merge Records, including a 12-song tracklist, but Merge later claimed that it was never planning to release a soundtrack.

== Distribution ==
=== Theatrical release ===
The world premiere of The Go-Getter was held on January 22, 2007, at the Sundance Film Festival. The film was subsequently screened at the AFI Dallas International Film Festival, Waterfront Film Festival, Nantucket Film Festival, Hamburg Film Festival, Austin Film Festival, Stockholm International Film Festival, and the Prague Febiofest. Peace Arch Entertainment bought the film's distribution rights and it was given a limited release on June 6, 2008, in selective theatres in New York City, Santa Monica and Irvine, California, and Portland, Oregon. The film's release was withdrawn on June 8, its theatrical run lasting only three days. On its only open weekend, the film earned US$11,931 across six locations with a per-screen average of $2,386. The Go-Getter placed 512th for the highest-grossing films of 2008 and 375th for the year's highest-grossing opening weekends.

=== Home media ===
The Go-Getter was released on DVD on October 21, 2008, in Region 1 and in August 2008 in Region 4. The region 1 disc includes an audio commentary with Martin Hynes, a "20 Questions" featurette with the cast and crew, a voucher for the download of a She & Him song, and a digital copy of the film for use with portable video players.

== Reception ==
On the review aggregator website Rotten Tomatoes, 44% of 25 critics' reviews are positive, with an average rating of 5.6/10. The website's consensus reads: "The Go-Getter features nice performances, but ultimately fails to carve its own path." At Metacritic, which assigns a normalized rating out of 100 to reviews from mainstream critics, the film received an average score of 69, based on 12 reviews.

Rolling Stone's Peter Travers awarded the film 3.5 out of 4 stars, commending the film for being "emotionally truthful, painfully funny and vibrantly alive" and labeling it "a near-perfect road movie". Stephen Holden of The New York Times believed that "Much of the dialogue is so quirky it sounds overheard instead of scripted" and called the cast "correspondingly spontaneous". New York magazine's chief film critic David Edelstein praised Hynes' "talent for deadpan jaw-droppers that aren't self-consciously quirky", and thought that "In The Go-Getter, filmmaking itself feels like Manifest Destiny." Todd McCarthy, writing for Variety, was impressed by Pucci's performance and Shah's cinematography, calling the film "an unusually fresh-feeling indie with a nice sense of style". The New York Press's Mark Peikert thought that Deschanel made the film's flaws "almost forgivable", and that the film was "a feature-length audition reel for Deschanel to finally get the roles she deserves". New York Daily News critic Elizabeth Weitzman called Pucci "one of the best, and most overlooked, young actors around" and giving the film 4 out of 5 stars.

Other reviews were less positive. The Los Angeles Times' Carina Chocano felt that "despite flashes of genuine emotion [The Go-Getter] eventually succumbs to its own tweeness" and that the "moments of beauty" were outweighed by "the mannered dialogue and hamstrung performances". Owen Gleiberman of Entertainment Weekly graded the film as a C, saying that it "travels, but it doesn't go anywhere" and likening Pucci to "a wan, passive Johnny Depp". The Hollywood Reporter critic Frank Scheck praised the film's "appealing performances, sun-dappled cinematography and occasional witty dialogue", but thought that it was "contrived and derivative" and "a little too pleased with itself". The Globe and Mail's Rick Groen called The Go-Getter "a fairly well-made picture that's just been fairly well-made too many times before, a knock-off of a thousand other knock-offs". Gabriel Wilder of The Sydney Morning Herald felt that it was "hard to maintain interest in [Mercer's] plight" because of Pucci's underacting and thought that "the script isn't so much quirky as incomplete", referring to the film's ending. With a rating of 2.5 out of 4, Maitland McDonagh of TV Guide wrote the film is "too familiar to make any great impression".
