= Dimension (film) =

- Directed by: Lars von Trier
- Written by: Lars von Trier and Niels Vørsel
- Produced by: Peter Aalbæk Jensen
- Production company: Zentropa
- Distributed by: Filmmagasinet Ekko
- Release date: 25 August 2010
- Running time: 27 minutes
- Country: Denmark
- Language: English

Dimension is a 2010 Danish unfinished gangster film written and directed by Lars von Trier. Production began in 1990, and the film was shot over eight years from 1990 until production ended in 1997. The original intention was to continue production in four-minute segments every year for a period of 33 years, with a final release in 2024. The unfinished film, released on DVD in 2010, consists of the completed footage as a short film.

== Cast ==
Trier was known in the same regular group of European actors including French-American Jean-Marc Barr, German Udo Kier, and Swedish Stellan Skarsgård, who were cast in several later Trier films: Breaking the Waves, Dancer in the Dark, Dogville, and Nymphomaniac. Also some actors appeared in the film from his previous works including Katrin Cartlidge (Breaking the Waves), Baard Owe (Medea, Europa, and Riget), Ernst-Hugo Järegård (Europa and Riget), Eddie Constantine (Europa), Jens Okking (Riget).

== See also ==
- List of films shot over three or more years
- List of abandoned and unfinished films
