= The Mothership =

Unreleased film by Netflix

- Directed by: Matthew Charman
- Written by: Matthew Charman
- Produced by: Fred Berger; Brian Kavanaugh-Jones
- Starring: Halle Berry; Molly Parker; Omari Hardwick
- Cinematography: Tod Campbell
- Edited by: Úna Ní Dhonghaíle
- Production companies: MRC; Range Media Partners
- Country: United States
- Language: English
- Budget: $40 million

The Mothership is an unreleased American science fiction film written and directed by Matthew Charman. The film stars Halle Berry, Molly Parker, and Omari Hardwick.

== Premise ==
One year after her husband mysteriously vanishes from their rural farm, single mother Sara Morse and her children discover a strange, extraterrestrial object underneath their home, which leads them to embark on a race to find their husband, father, and most importantly – the truth.

== Cast ==
- Halle Berry as Sara Morse
- Molly Parker
- Omari Hardwick
- Sydney Lemmon as Johanna
- Rafael Silva as Alex
- John Ortiz
- Paul Guilfoyle as Dr. Francis Singer

== Production ==
=== Development ===
The Mothership was announced in February 2021, with Halle Berry set to star and executive produce, and screenwriter Matthew Charman debuting as director.

=== Filming ===
Principal photography began on June 14, 2021, and concluded on August 9, 2021, in Boston, Massachusetts.

=== Cancellation ===
In January 2024, Netflix announced that it no longer planned to release the film. Reasons given included its lengthy post-production process and that "it was never completed". A newsletter written by reporter Jeff Sneider offered as an additional explanation that the production involved numerous child actors, actors who had grown out of their roles between the start of filming and now.

On February 2, Netflix chief content officer Bela Bajaria, said "everybody just felt like it was the right thing to not do it."

== See also ==
- List of abandoned and unfinished films
