= Alex Proyas' unrealized projects =

During his career, Australian film director Alex Proyas has worked on a number of projects which never progressed beyond the pre-production stage under his direction. Some of these projects, are officially cancelled and scrapped or fell in development hell.

== 1990s ==
=== Casper ===
Proyas was initially attached to direct a film adaptation of Casper the Friendly Ghost, but on November 28, 1993, Proyas left the film due to creative differences. In an interview with Comic Book Resources, Proyas admitted that the screenplay was rewritten not to his liking. He claimed that he was intrigued with doing a children's fantasy, and wanted to do a more dark film, akin to The Wizard of Oz. The film was ultimately directed by Brad Silberling.

=== Quatermass and the Pit remake ===
In 1998, Proyas was reportedly developing an updated version of Quatermass and the Pit, however, he indicated that undisclosed legal issues needed to be cleared by Warner Bros. before it could move forward.

=== The Masque of the Red Death ===
On May 7, 1999, it was announced that Proyas would direct a medieval fantasy film adaptation of Edgar Allan Poe's story The Masque of the Red Death, with Proyas and Stuart Hazeldine writing a "Dirty Dozen-esque" screenplay and producing with Julie Corman and Andrew Mason for Fox 2000.

=== Rizen ===
On May 7, 1999, it was announced that Proyas would direct Rizen, a horror-thriller written by Proyas and Stuart Hazeldine for Universal Pictures.

=== Untitled time-travel film ===
On August 24, 1999, it was announced that Proyas would produce and direct a time-travel film based on a pitch he and Jerrold E. Brown came up with for 20th Century Fox, with Brown writing the screenplay after Proyas was impressed by Brown's draft for a comedic Lobo movie.

== 2000s ==
=== Enoch's Portal ===
On June 2, 2000, it was announced that Proyas would write and direct the film adaptation of Andy Hill's suspense novel Enoch's Portal for Sean Daniel’s Alphaville Productions.

=== Berserker ===
On December 11, 2000, it was announced that Proyas would direct a film based on Fred Saberhagen's Berserker series with Jesse Alexander writing the script and New Line Cinema producing the film.

=== Drive ===
On October 18, 2001, it was announced that Proyas would direct and produce a film based on Harlan Ellison's short story Along the Scenic Route entitled Drive with Cyrus Vorris and Ethan Reiff writing the script and Paramount Pictures producing the film.

=== The Killer's Game ===
On August 8, 2004, Proyas was one of many directors offered to direct a film adaptation of Jay Bonansinga's novel The Killer's Game, but J. J. Perry ended up directing the feature film adaptation instead.

=== Dracula Untold ===
On July 10, 2007, it was announced that Proyas would direct Dracula Year Zero for Universal Pictures, with Matt Sazama and Burk Sharpless writing the screenplay. On February 10, 2012, it was reported that Gary Shore would be taking over the film, as Proyas and prospective star Sam Worthington had been let go from the project due to its high budget. The film was eventually retitled Dracula Untold and released in theatres October 10, 2014.

=== The Unpleasant Profession of Jonathan Hoag ===
On August 22, 2008, Proyas was set to write and direct the film adaptation of Robert A. Heinlein’s novella The Unpleasant Profession of Jonathan Hoag and produce along with Phoenix Pictures. On April 10, 2012, Red Granite Pictures and James Vanderbilt’s Mythology Entertainment were set to produce Proyas' feature film adaptation with Phoenix Pictures.

=== Foundation ===
On January 16, 2009, Proyas was offered to direct a film adaptation of Isaac Asimov's Foundation book series in a rights auction for Warner Bros. Pictures, but Roland Emmerich and Columbia Pictures acquired the rights instead, which lapsed and eventually became a television series on Apple TV+.

=== The Tripods ===
On January 29, 2009, it was announced that Proyas would direct and co-write with Stuart Hazeldine the film adaptation of John Christopher’s The Tripods starting with The White Mountain.

== 2010s ==
=== Paradise Lost ===
On September 16, 2010, Proyas was set to direct a 3-D film adaptation of John Milton’s poem Paradise Lost for Legendary Entertainment, with Bradley Cooper cast as Lucifer, Benjamin Walker as Michael, Djimon Hounsou as Abdiel, Casey Affleck as Gabriel, Dominic Purcell as Satan, Diego Boneta as Adam, Rufus Sewell as Sammael, Camilla Belle as Eve, Sam Reid as Raphael, and Callan McAuliffe as Uriel. On December 7, 2011, production was halted, and on February 9, 2012, Legendary officially scrapped the film.

=== Amped ===
On December 1, 2010, Proyas was set to produce and possibly direct the film adaptation of Daniel H. Wilson’s sci-fi thriller novel Amped for Summit Entertainment, and on March 18, 2011, Proyas was confirmed to direct the film adaptation.

=== Joe Golem and the Drowning City ===
On July 11, 2012, Proyas was set to write and direct the film adaptation of Mike Mignola and Christopher Golden’s comic book Joe Golem and the Drowning City for Constantin Film.

=== Evolve TV series ===
On November 1, 2012, Proyas was set to direct and executive produce Evolve, a crime drama series about a biotoxin threat written by Jamie Paglia and produce for ABC, but the series was ultimately never picked up.

== 2020s ==
=== A New Country ===
On February 17, 2020, Proyas revealed that he was making A New Country, a sci-fi movie starring Guy Pearce, but it likely fell through during the first wave of the COVID-19 pandemic.

=== Dark City TV series ===
On August 12, 2021, Proyas revealed that he was making a television series of his movie Dark City.

=== Sister Darkness ===
On May 20, 2022, it was announced that Proyas was preparing to direct the new horror thriller film Sister Darkness, budgeted at $35 million, for 108 Media.

=== Heaven ===
On February 18, 2023,

== Offers ==
=== A Nightmare on Elm Street sequel ===
Proyas was offered a sequel to A Nightmare on Elm Street (possibly The Dream Child) as his directorial debut, but he turned it down as he was more interested in original material rather than sequels.

=== X-Men: The Last Stand ===
Proyas had been on the shortlist to replace Bryan Singer as the director of X-Men: The Last Stand, but he turned it down due to his poor experience with filming I, Robot for Fox.

=== Quantum of Solace ===
Proyas had been on the shortlist to direct Quantum of Solace; Marc Forster would eventually be chosen.
