= Martin Hynes =

American screenwriter, director, and actor

- Born: Eugene, Oregon, U.S.
- Education: Columbia University (B.A.); University of Southern California (M.A.)
- Occupations: Screenwriter, director, actor
- Years active: 1995–present
- Notable work: The Go-Getter; George Lucas in Love; The Magician's Elephant; Toy Story 4 Golden

Martin Hynes is an American screenwriter, film director, actor, and film producer.

== Life and career ==
Hynes was born and raised in Eugene, Oregon, and has a bachelor's degree in history from Columbia University.

Hynes wrote and directed The Go-Getter, starring Lou Taylor Pucci, Zooey Deschanel, Jena Malone, and Nick Offerman, which premiered to critical acclaim at the Sundance Film Festival. He co-wrote the story for the Academy Award-winning Toy Story 4.

Hynes collaborated with Pharrell Williams on a musical feature film originally titled Atlantis, which was originally in development at 20th Century Studios, before the project moved to Universal Pictures, and was retitled Golden, which was now permanently cancelled. He had written the film adaptation of Kate DiCamillo's novel, The Magician's Elephant, released by Netflix in 2022.

As an actor, Hynes starred as a young George Lucas in the short film George Lucas in Love, for which he received a Best Actor award in San Sebastián.

Prior to this, he wrote the script Stealing Stanford, which served as the inspiration for the film Stealing Harvard, although many changes were made to the script that were contrary to Hynes's wishes.

His first film, Al as in Al was written and filmed while Hynes was a student at the USC graduate film school, which he attended on the Paramount Pictures Fellowship. Al as in Al premiered at HBO's U.S. Comedy Arts Festival, and was chosen by USC as one of the best films in the film school's history.
