= M. Ward discography =

This is the discography for American singer-songwriter M. Ward.

== Solo work ==
=== Albums ===
==== Studio albums ====
Solo albums, with selected details, chart positions and sales
Title	Details	Peak chart positions										Sales
Title	Details	US	US Indie	AUS Hit.	BEL (FL)	BEL (WA)	SCO	SPA	SWE	UK	UK Indie	Sales
Duet for Guitars #2	Released: 1999; Label: Co-Dependent	— (Note: Duet for Guitars #2 did not enter the US Billboard 200, but peaked at number 39 on the US Heatseekers Albums Chart.)	—	—	—	—	—	—	—	—	—	
End of Amnesia	Released: July 17, 2001; (reissued 2013): Label: Self-released	—	—	—	—	—	—	—	—	—	—	
Transfiguration of Vincent	Released: March 18, 2003; Label: Merge	—	—	—	—	—	—	—	—	—	—	
Transistor Radio	Released: February 22, 2005; Label: Merge	— (Note: Transistor Radio did not enter the US Billboard 200, but peaked at number 27 on the US Heatseekers Albums Chart.)	36	—	—	—	—	—	—	—	33	
Post-War	Released: August 22, 2006; Label: Merge	146	7	—	—	—	—	—	28	—	22	
Hold Time	Released: February 17, 2009; Label: Merge	31	1	5	33	—	100	—	31	—	10	
A Wasteland Companion	Released: April 10, 2012; Label: Merge	21	5	12	33	—	92	51	35	106	15	US: 46,000
More Rain	Released: March 4, 2016; Label: Merge	128	7	14	59	174	—	—	—	— (Note: More Rain did not enter the UK Albums Chart, but peaked at number 12 on the UK Record Store Chart.)	34	
What a Wonderful Industry	Released: June 8, 2018; Label: M. Ward	—	—	—	—	—	—	—	—	— (Note: What a Wonderful Industry did not enter the UK Albums Chart, but peaked at number 24 on the UK Record Store Chart.)	—	
Migration Stories	Released: April 3, 2020; Label: Anti- / M. Ward	— (Note: Migration Stories did not enter the US Billboard 200, but peaked at number 77 on the US Top Current Albums Chart.)	—	—	—	—	—	—	—	—	—	
Think of Spring	Released: December 11, 2020; Label: Anti- / M. Ward	—	—	—	—	—	—	—	—	—	—	
Supernatural Thing	Released: June 23, 2023; Label: Anti- / M. Ward	—	—	—	—	—	—	—	—	—	—	
"—" denotes releases that did not chart, or was not released in that country.

==== Live albums ====
Title	Details
Live Music & The Voice of Strangers	Released: 2001; Label: Self-released

=== EPs ===
- Scene from No. 12 (I Ain't Sleeping) (2000)
- To Go Home (2007)

=== Singles ===
Title	Year	Peak chart positions						Album
Title	Year	US Sales	US AAA	BEL (FL)	MEX Eng.	UK Phys.	UK Indie	Album
"To Go Home"	2007	5	—	—	—	—	25	Post-War
"Hold Time"	2009	—	—	—	—	—	—	Hold Time
"Never Had Nobody Like You" (featuring Zooey Deschanel)	2009	—	—	—	—	—	—	Hold Time
"Rave On" (featuring Zooey Deschanel)	2009	—	—	—	—	—	—	Hold Time
"The First Time I Ran Away"	2012	—	—	—	—	—	—	A Wasteland Companion
"Primitive Girl"	2012	—	—	—	47	78	—	A Wasteland Companion
"Me and My Shadow"	2012	—	—	—	—	—	—	A Wasteland Companion
"Here Comes the Sun Again" (Four-Track Demo)	2014	—	—	—	—	—	—	Transistor Radio (reissue)
"Girl from Conejo Valley"	2015	—	—	—	—	—	—	More Rain
"Confession"	2016	—	—	—	—	—	—	More Rain
"Temptation"	2016	—	—	— (Note: "Temptation" did not enter the Flanders Ultratop Top 50, but charted as an "extra tip" on the Flanders Ultratop Bubbling Under chart.)	—	—	—	More Rain
"Slow Driving Man"	2016	—	—	—	—	—	—	More Rain
"Migration of Souls"	2019	—	—	—	—	—	—	Migration Stories
"Unreal City"	2020	—	35	—	—	—	—	Migration Stories
"Birthday"	2021	—	—	—	—	—	—	Non-album single
"Supernatural Thing"	2023	—	—	—	—	—	—	Supernatural Thing
"New Kerrang"	2023	—	—	—	—	—	—	Supernatural Thing
"Too Young to Die" (featuring First Aid Kit)	2023	—	—	—	—	—	—	Supernatural Thing
"—" denotes releases that did not chart, or was not released in that country.

== With other artists ==
=== Arizona Amp and Alternator ===
- Arizona Amp and Alternator (2005)

=== She & Him ===
Albums as She & Him, with selected details and chart positions
Title	Details	Peak chart positions								
Title	Details	US	US Folk	US Rock	AUS	BEL (Fla)	FRA	SPA	SWE	UK
Volume One	Released: 2008; Label: Merge	71	—	—	—	—	—	—	—	—
Volume Two	Released: 2010; Label: Merge	6	1	1	49	67	104	87	28	62
A Very She & Him Christmas	Released: October 25, 2011; Label: Merge	12	1	3	—	—	—	—	—	—
Volume Three	Released: May 7, 2013; Label: Merge	15	1	3	—	67	—	94	37	63
Classics	Released: December 2, 2014; Label: Merge	41	1	7	—	—	—	—	—	—
"—" denotes releases that did not chart, or was not released in that country.

=== Monsters of Folk ===
- Monsters of Folk (2009) (#15 U.S.)

=== Tired Pony ===
- The Place We Ran From (2010)

=== Compilation tracks ===
- "John King's Watercolor Bicycle" on Acuarela Songs 1 (2001, Acuarela)
- "Fearless" on Merge Records Presents: Survive and Advance Vol. 3 (2003, Merge)
- "Story of an Artist" (Daniel Johnston) on The Late Great Daniel Johnston: Discovered Covered (2004, Gammon)
- "One More Goodbye" on Old Enough 2 Know Better: 15 Years of Merge Records (2004, Merge)
- "Let My Love Open the Door" (Pete Townshend) on Sweetheart 2005: Love Songs (2005, Hear)
- "Green River" (Creedence Clearwater Revival) on Green River: Benefit For Mercy Corps (2005, Merge)
- "Bean Vine Blues #2" (John Fahey) on I Am the Resurrection: A Tribute to John Fahey (2006, Vanguard)
- "What Is a Soul?" on Big Change: Songs for FINCA (2007, IODA)
- "Let's Dance" on Sounds Eclectic: The Covers Project (2007, Hear)
- "Crooked Lines" on The Hottest State (Original Motion Picture Soundtrack) (2007, Sony/ATV)

=== Other appearances ===
- The Band of Blacky Ranchette – Still Lookin' Good to Me (2003, Thrill Jockey)
- My Morning Jacket – Z – Into The Woods (2005, ATO)
- Jenny Lewis & The Watson Twins – Rabbit Fur Coat (2006, Team Love)
- Bright Eyes – Four Winds (2007, Saddle Creek)
- Bright Eyes – Cassadaga (2007, Saddle Creek)
- Jenny Lewis – Acid Tongue (2008, Reprise)
- Jolie Holland – The Living and the Dead (2008, Anti Records)
- Alain Bashung – Bleu pétrole (2008, Barclay Records)
- Eli Stone – season one, episode two
- The Go-Getter
- Por Vida: A Tribute to the Songs of Alejandro Escovedo
- The Late Great Daniel Johnston: Discovered Covered (2004, Gammon Records)
- Eyes on the Prize – with Janne Schra on Janne Schra (2013, Universal Music)
