= Lady in Satin =

Studio album by Billie Holiday
- Released: June 1958
- Recorded: February 19–21, 1958
- Studios: Columbia 30th Street, New York City
- Genre: Vocal jazz
- Length: 44:36
- Label: Columbia
- Producer: Irving Townsend

Billie Holiday chronology
All or Nothing at All (1957)	Lady in Satin (1958)	Last Recording (1959)

Lady in Satin is the eleventh studio album by jazz singer Billie Holiday, released in 1958 on Columbia Records, catalogue CL 1157 in mono and CS 8048 in stereo. It is the penultimate album completed by the singer. Her final album, "Billie Holiday" was released just before her death; the album was retitled Last Recording, and re-released just after her death. Lady in Satin was produced by Irving Townsend and engineered by Fred Plaut.

== Background ==
For the majority of the 1950s, Billie Holiday was signed to jazz producer Norman Granz's Clef Records, which was later absorbed into the newly founded Verve Records by 1956. All of her work for Norman Granz consisted of small jazz combos, reuniting her with musicians she recorded with back in the 1930s when she made her first recordings with Teddy Wilson. There were talks in the early 1950s of Holiday making albums, or songbooks, dedicated to composers such as George and Ira Gershwin and Jerome Kern, but they fell through and ended up going to Ella Fitzgerald when she signed to Verve. By 1957, Holiday had recorded twelve albums for Granz and was unhappy. Therefore, she decided not to renew her contract.

By October 1957, Holiday contacted Columbia producer Irving Townsend and expressed interest in recording with bandleader Ray Ellis. Originally, she wanted to do an album with bandleader Nelson Riddle after hearing his arrangements for Frank Sinatra's albums, particularly In the Wee Small Hours, but after hearing Ellis's version of "For All We Know", she wanted to record with him. When Holiday came to Townsend about the album, he was surprised:

It would be like Ella Fitzgerald saying that she wanted to record with Ray Conniff. But she said she wanted a pretty album, something delicate. She said this over and over. She thought it would be beautiful. She wasn't interested in some wild swinging jam session ... She wanted that cushion under her voice. She wanted to be flattered by that kind of sound.

Townsend got in touch with Ellis about the album. Ellis, having heard Holiday's work throughout the 1930s and 1940s, was excited for the project, saying, "I couldn't believe it ... I didn't know she was aware of me." Townsend arranged a meeting for both Holiday and Ellis to sign a contract with Columbia. Columbia provided an unlimited budget for the album. The musicians in the orchestra were paid $60 for the three sessions and Holiday was paid $150 per side in advance. Townsend went on to set up the recording dates for late February 1958.

== Content ==
When Holiday signed her contract for Columbia, the label looked at it as a new beginning as this was her return to the label after sixteen years. During Holiday's time with Norman Granz's label, she revisited old material she had previously recorded and songs that were well known in her repertoire, such as "My Man", "Lover, Come Back to Me", "I Cover the Waterfront", "Them There Eyes", and "I Only Have Eyes for You". Columbia wanted Holiday to do an album of songs she had never recorded before, so the material for Lady in Satin derived from the usual sources for Holiday in her three-decade career, that of the Great American Songbook of classic pop. Also, unlike the bulk of Holiday's recordings with Norman Granz and her early years at Columbia in the 1930s and early 1940s, rather than in the setting of a jazz combo Holiday returns to the backdrop of full orchestral arrangements as done during her Decca years eight years earlier. She wanted the album to be in the same contemporary vein of Frank Sinatra or Ella Fitzgerald on her Song Books series.

Ray Ellis made his arrangements of the songs to match Holiday's voice. By the mid- to late-1950s, Holiday's voice had changed drastically due to years of alcohol and drug abuse, altering its texture and giving it a fragile, raspy sound. Despite her voice's condition, its distinctive edge had not been lost, and the style of phrasing that had made her a popular jazz singer remained at her command. Ray Ellis said of Holiday's voice:

I heard her voice [and] I dug it. I was in love with that voice and I was picturing a very evil, sensuous, sultry, very evil ... probably one of the most evil voices I've heard in my life ... Evil is earthy to me. When you say someone is evil, it means very, very bad. I don't mean bad.

Ellis used a 40-piece orchestra, complete with horns, strings, reeds, and even a three-piece choir. It would turn out to be Holiday's most expensive music production. Soloists on the album included Mel Davis, Urbie Green, and the bebop trombone pioneer J. J. Johnson.

== Reception ==
Professional ratings
Review scores
Source	Rating
AllMusic	4.5/5 stars
The Encyclopedia of Popular Music	5/5 stars
The Penguin Guide to Jazz	3/4 stars
The Rolling Stone Jazz Record Guide	2/5 stars

Reaction to the album has been mixed. Holiday's voice had lost much of its upper range in her 40s, although she still retained her rhythmic phrasing. The Penguin Guide to Jazz gave the album a three-star rating out of a possible four stars, but expressed a basic reservation about the album, describing it as "a voyeuristic look at a beaten woman." The Rolling Stone Jazz Record Guide said, "Lady in Satin presents the Lady overdressed. It's an album from the late Fifties, when much of Billie's punch was gone."

However, the trumpeter Buck Clayton preferred the work of the later Holiday to that of the younger woman that he had often worked with in the 1930s. Ray Ellis said of the album in 1997:

I would say that the most emotional moment was her listening to the playback of "I'm a Fool to Want You". There were tears in her eyes ... After we finished the album I went into the control room and listened to all the takes. I must admit I was unhappy with her performance, but I was just listening musically instead of emotionally. It wasn't until I heard the final mix a few weeks later that I realized how great her performance really was.

Lady in Satin was reissued by Legacy Records on September 23, 1997, remastering using 20-bit technology with four bonus tracks. Reissue producer Phil Schaap located the unused master tape for the stereo version of "The End of a Love Affair", and included a stereo mix of the "I'm a Fool to Want You" take which had been used on the mono LP. Lady in Satin was inducted into the Grammy Hall of Fame in 2000.

In 2020, Rolling Stone magazine rated the album at number 317 in the Top 500 Greatest Albums of All-Time.

== Track listing ==
The album was released in stereo (CS 8048) and mono (CL 1157) versions; the mono release contained an extra track, "The End of a Love Affair".

LP side one
No.	Title	Writer(s)	Length
1.	"I'm a Fool to Want You"	Frank Sinatra; Joel Herron; Jack Wolf	3:23
2.	"For Heaven's Sake"	Elise Bretton; Sherman Edwards; Donald Meyer	3:26
3.	"You Don't Know What Love Is"	Gene de Paul; Don Raye	3:48
4.	"I Get Along Without You Very Well"	Hoagy Carmichael	2:59
5.	"For All We Know"	J. Fred Coots; Sam M. Lewis	2:53
6.	"Violets for Your Furs"	Tom Adair; Matt Dennis	3:24

LP side two
No.	Title	Writer(s)	Length
1.	"You've Changed"	Bill Carey; Carl T. Fischer	3:17
2.	"It's Easy to Remember"	Richard Rodgers; Lorenz Hart	4:01
3.	"But Beautiful"	Jimmy Van Heusen; Johnny Burke	4:29
4.	"Glad to Be Unhappy"	Rodgers; Hart	4:07
5.	"I'll Be Around"	Alec Wilder	3:23
6.	"The End of a Love Affair" (mono only)	Edward Redding	4:46

1997 Legacy Records CD release
1. "I'm a Fool to Want You" (Frank Sinatra, Joel Herron, Jack Wolf) – 3:23
2. "For Heaven's Sake" (Elise Bretton, Sherman Edwards, Donald Meyer) – 3:26
3. "You Don't Know What Love Is" (Gene DePaul, Don Raye) – 3:48
4. "I Get Along Without You Very Well" (Hoagy Carmichael) – 2:59
5. "For All We Know" (J. Fred Coots, Sam M. Lewis) – 2:53
6. "Violets for Your Furs" (Tom Adair, Matt Dennis) – 3:24
7. "You've Changed" (Bill Carey, Carl T. Fischer) – 3:17
8. "It's Easy to Remember" (Richard Rodgers, Lorenz Hart) – 4:01
9. "But Beautiful" (Jimmy Van Heusen, Johnny Burke) – 4:29
10. "Glad to Be Unhappy" (Richard Rodgers, Lorenz Hart) – 4:07
11. "I'll Be Around" (Alec Wilder) – 3:23
12. "The End of a Love Affair" (Edward Redding) – 4:46 [mono]
13. "I'm a Fool to Want You" [take 3 stereo] – 3:24
14. "I'm a Fool to Want You" [take 2] – 3:23
15. "The End of a Love Affair" The Audio Story – 9:49
16. "The End of a Love Affair" [stereo] – 4:46
17. [Pause Track] – 0:06

=== The Centennial Edition ===
On April 14, 2015, Columbia Records released a three-CD set album, Lady in Satin: The Centennial Edition, a week after the 100th anniversary of Billie Holiday's birth. Roughly 70 minutes' worth of material—including 13 complete tracks, incomplete tracks, studio chatter, breakdowns, false starts, and warm-ups, are present on the album. Previously, all of it (except for those fragments without Billie Holiday) had been released by Michael Fontannes on his Kangourou/Masters of Jazz Label, Volume 27.

Track listing of The Centennial Edition

CD One
(tracks 1–12 are the songs that appeared on the original 1958 Lady in Satin release)

1. "I'm a Fool to Want You" (Frank Sinatra, Joel Herron, Jack Wolf) – 3:23 [uses takes 2 & 3]
2. "For Heaven's Sake" (Elise Bretton, Sherman Edwards, Donald Meyer) – 3:26 [uses take 2]
3. "You Don't Know What Love Is" (Gene DePaul, Don Raye) – 3:48 [uses take 4]
4. "I Get Along Without You Very Well" (Hoagy Carmichael) – 2:59 [uses take 6]
5. "For All We Know" (J. Fred Coots, Sam M. Lewis) – 2:53 [uses take 5]
6. "Violets for Your Furs" (Tom Adair, Matt Dennis) – 3:24 [uses take 7]
7. "You've Changed" (Bill Carey, Carl T. Fischer) – 3:17 [uses take 4]
8. "It's Easy to Remember" (Richard Rodgers, Lorenz Hart) – 4:01 [uses take 8]
9. "But Beautiful" (Jimmy Van Heusen, Johnny Burke) – 4:29 [uses take 2]
10. "Glad to Be Unhappy" (Richard Rodgers, Lorenz Hart) – 4:07 [uses take 8]
11. "I'll Be Around" (Alec Wilder) – 3:23 [uses take 5]
12. "The End of a Love Affair" (Edward Redding) – 4:46 [stereo master – take 4 with vocal overdub take 8]
13. "I'm a Fool to Want You" (mono master – take 3) – 3:25
14. "The End of a Love Affair" (mono master – take 4 with vocal overdub take 8) – 4:51
15. "Fine and Mellow" (Billie Holiday) – 6:19 [studio recording that appeared originally on Columbia's 1957 The Sound of Jazz album]

CD Two
(February 19, 1958, session reels are tracks 1–4, February 20, 1958, session reels are tracks 5–13)

1. You Don't Know What Love Is (takes 1–3) – 5:20
2. I'll Be Around (takes 1 & 2) – 3:55
3. I'll Be Around (takes 3 & 4 plus inserts) – 6:28
4. For Heaven's Sake (take 1) – 3:55
5. But Beautiful (take 1) – 1:01
6. For All We Know (take 1) – 3:18
7. For All We Know (take 2) – 3:09
8. For All We Know (takes 3 & 4) – 3:42
9. It's Easy to Remember (takes 1 & 2) – 7:37
10. It's Easy to Remember (takes 3–7) – 4:23
11. I'm a Fool to Want You (take 1) – 3:21
12. I'm a Fool to Want You (takes 2 & 3) – 3:27
13. The End of a Love Affair (takes 1–4) – 8:09

CD Three
(February 21, 1958, session reels)

1. The End of a Love Affair (vocal overdub takes 1–4) 5:14
2. The End of a Love Affair (vocal overdub takes 5–7) 12:11
3. Glad to Be Unhappy (takes 1 & 2) 2:06
4. Glad to Be Unhappy (take 3) 4:16
5. Glad to Be Unhappy (tales 4–7) 4:01
6. You've Changed (takes 1–3) 3:14
7. I Get Along Without You Very Well (takes 1 & 2) 0:54
8. I Get Along Without You Very Well (takes 3 & 4) 3:58
9. I Get Along Without You Very Well (take 5) 3:12
10. Violets for Your Furs (takes 1–3) 2:55
11. Violets for Your Furs (takes 4 & 5) 4:15
12. Violets for Your Furs (take 6) 3:26

== Personnel ==
- Billie Holiday – lead vocals
- Ray Ellis – conductor
- Claus Ogerman – arranger
- George Ockner – violin and concertmaster
- Emmanual Green – violin
- Harry Hoffman – violin
- Harry Katzmann – violin
- Leo Kruczek – violin
- Milton Lomask – violin
- Harry Meinikoff – violin
- David Newman – violin
- Samuel Rand – violin
- David Sarcer – violin
- Sid Brecher – viola
- Richard Dichler – viola
- David Soyer – cello
- Maurice Brown – cello
- Janet Putman – harp
- Danny Bank – flute
- Phil Bodner – flute
- Romeo Penque – flute
- Tom Parshley – flute
- Mel Davis – trumpet (solos on "You Don't Know What Love Is" and "But Beautiful")
- Billy Butterfield – trumpet
- Jimmy Ochner – trumpet
- Bernie Glow – trumpet
- J.J. Johnson – trombone (solo on "Glad to be Unhappy and "I Get Along Without you (Except Sometimes)")
- Urbie Green – trombone (solos on "I'm a Fool to Want You" and "It's Easy to Remember")
- Jack Green – trombone
- Tommy Mitchell – bass trombone
- Mal Waldron – piano
- Barry Galbraith – guitar
- Milt Hinton – double bass
- Osie Johnson – drums
- Elise Bretton – backing vocals
- Miriam Workman – backing vocals

== In popular culture ==
On December 11, 2020 singer-songwriter M. Ward released Think of Spring which is a tribute to Lady in Satin. The album features solo acoustic versions most of the songs from Lady in Satin (excluding Glad to Be Unhappy and The End of a Love Affair and including All The Way, which was recorded by Holiday and released on her 1959 album Last Recording.)
