= Duet for Guitars =

Duet for Guitars may refer to the following works by M. Ward:

- Duet for Guitars #2, a 1999 album
  - "Duet for Guitars #2", the first track on the album
  - "Duet for Guitars #1", a bonus track on the 2007 reissue of the album
- "Duet for Guitars #3," a track on the 2003 album Transfiguration of Vincent
