= Hold Time (album) =

Studio album by M. Ward
- Released: February 17, 2009
- Genre: Alternative, folk
- Length: 42:40
- Label: Merge, 4AD
- Producer: M. Ward

M. Ward chronology
To Go Home EP (2007)	Hold Time (2009)	A Wasteland Companion (2012)

Professional ratings
Aggregate scores
Source	Rating
Metacritic	79/100
Review scores
Source	Rating
AllMusic	4/5 stars
Robert Christgau	(3-star Honorable Mention)
Consequence of Sound	4/5 stars
Drowned in Sound	4.5/5 stars
KPSU	8/10 stars
Pitchfork	6.8/10
PopMatters	8/10 stars
Rolling Stone	3.5/5 stars
Slant Magazine	4/5 stars
Spin	3.5/5 stars
Tiny Mix Tapes	3.5/5 stars

Hold Time is the sixth studio album from M. Ward, released on February 17, 2009. Hold Time is the follow-up to his 2006 album Post-War and its companion EP To Go Home in 2007.

Hold Time includes guest performances by Jason Lytle of the band Grandaddy, Lucinda Williams, Tom Hagerman of DeVotchKa, and She & Him co-contributor Zooey Deschanel. The album includes a cover of the Buddy Holly song "Rave On". A streaming preview was made available through NPR before the album's release. M. Ward also made an appearance on the Late Show with David Letterman on February 17, 2009.

== Track listing ==
1. "For Beginners" – 2:47
2. "Never Had Nobody Like You" (Featuring Zooey Deschanel) – 2:26
3. "Jailbird" – 2:31
4. "Hold Time" – 3:05
5. "Rave On" (Featuring Zooey Deschanel) (Norman Petty, Bill Tilghman, Sonny West) – 3:35
6. "To Save Me" (Featuring Jason Lytle) – 3:01
7. "One Hundred Million Years" – 2:11
8. "Stars of Leo" – 3:18
9. "Fisher of Men" – 3:12
10. "Oh Lonesome Me" (Featuring Lucinda Williams) (Don Gibson) – 6:05
11. "Epistemology" – 3:49
12. "Blake's View" – 2:29
13. "Shangri-La" – 2:20
14. "Outro (AKA: I'm a Fool to Want You)" (Joel Herron, Frank Sinatra, Jack Wolf) – 3:47

== Personnel ==
- M. Ward – voice, guitar, keyboards, bass, string arrangements
- Mike Coykendall – bass, percussion
- Adam Selzer, Jordan Hudson, Rachel Blumberg, Than Luu – percussion
- Peter Broderick, Tom Hagerman – strings, violins
- Bill Ritchie – upright bass
- Mike Mogis – percussion, bells, mandolin, keyboards
- Dave Campbell – cello
- Allison Stewart – viola
- Elin Palmer – violin
- Zooey Deschanel – vocals on "Never Had Nobody Like You" and "Rave On"
- Jason Lytle – vocals, keyboards, and guitar on "To Save Me"
- Lucinda Williams – vocals on "Oh Lonesome Me"

== Charts ==
Chart (2009)	Peak position
Belgian Albums (Ultratop Flanders)	33
Swedish Albums (Sverigetopplistan)	31
US Billboard 200	31
US Top Alternative Albums (Billboard)	7
US Digital Albums (Billboard)	6
US Independent Albums (Billboard)	1
US Top Rock Albums (Billboard)	10
US Indie Store Album Sales (Billboard)	2
