= The Lost Brothers =

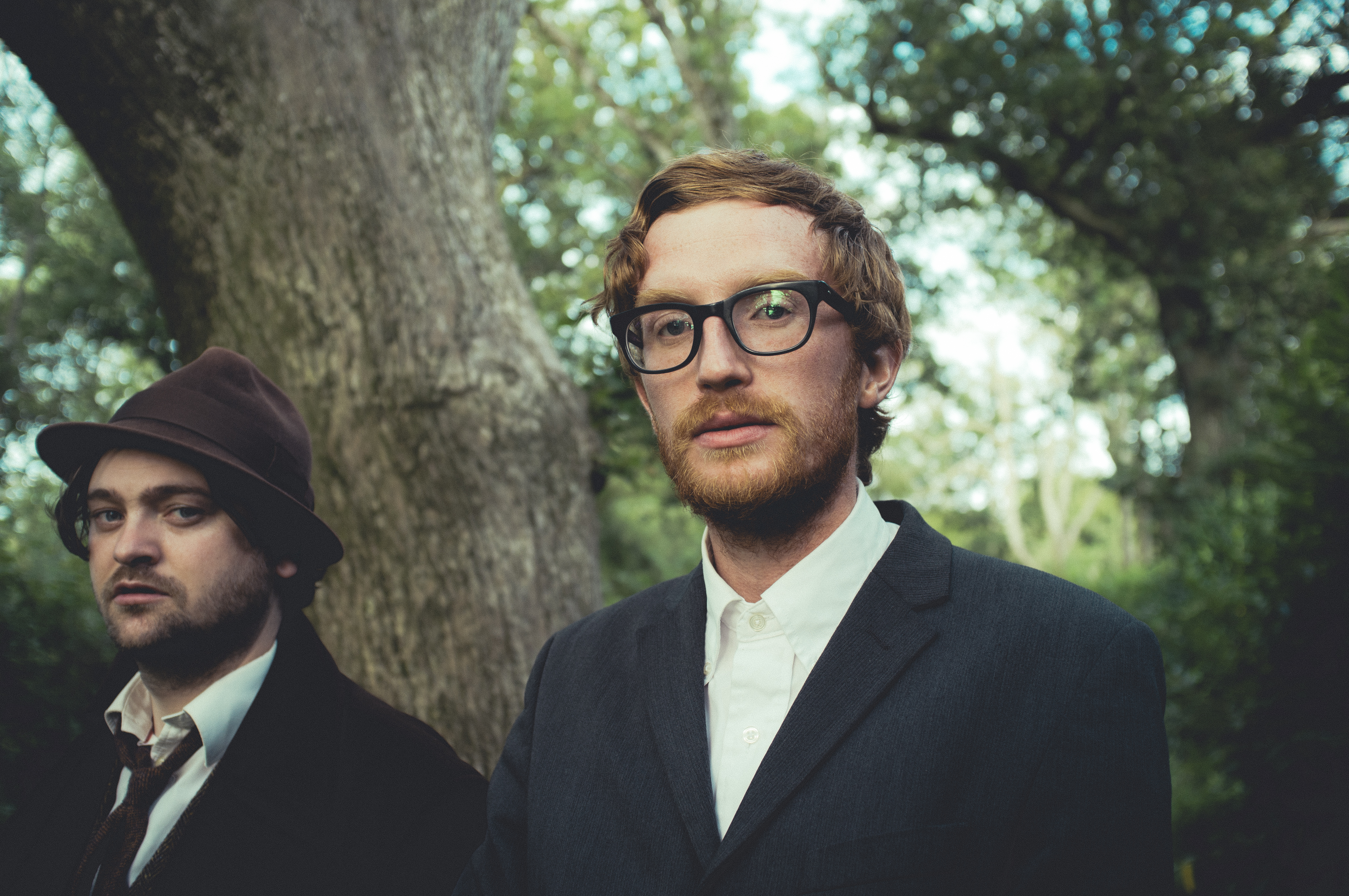
- At the End of the Road Festival, 2012

Background information
- Origin: Ireland
- Genres: Folk, country, blues
- Years active: 2008–present
- Labels: Bird Dog Records, Readymade Records, Lojinx
- Members: Oisín Leech, Mark McCausland
- Website: thelostbrothersband.com

The Lost Brothers are an Irish musical duo consisting of Mark McCausland and Oisín Leech, formerly of The Basement and The 747s.

== History ==
In 2006, Leech appeared on Arctic Monkeys' cover of Barbara Lewis's Baby I'm Yours, sharing lead vocals with Arctic Monkeys' Alex Turner. The song was released as a b-side on Arctic Monkeys' single Leave Before the Lights Come On.

McCausland was the lead guitarist in The Basement, who were signed to the Liverpool-based label Deltasonic Records. McCausland and Leech first met while The 747s and The Basement toured together, and The Lost Brothers formed in 2008 following the disintegration of both bands. The band have been recording and touring extensively ever since, releasing five albums in the years between 2008 and 2018.

Their first album, Trails of the Lonely, was released in 2008 and produced in Portland Oregon by Mike Coykendall (Bright Eyes, M Ward) and The Decemberists collaborator Adam Selzer.

In 2010 The Lost Brothers recorded their second album, So Long John Fante, in Sheffield with producer Colin Elliot with members of Richard Hawley's band backing them in the studio. The album received positive reviews in The Irish Times, Hot Press and the Irish Examiner and saw the band perform live on The Late Late Show and on the BBCs The Culture Show.

In 2011, the band travelled to Nashville where they recorded new material with Brendan Benson as producer. Members of Old Crow Medicine Show and The Cardinals performed as their band for the recordings which became their third album, The Passing of the Night. The album was released on Benson's Readymade Records in the U.S. and on Lojinx in Europe.

In 2011, Barbara Orbison invited the band to record a song for the 75th Roy Orbison anniversary album.

In 2014, The Lost Brothers recorded their fourth studio album, New Songs of Dawn and Dust, in Liverpool with producer Bill Ryder-Jones and features Nick Power of The Coral. These sessions also spawned a mini album, which features The Lost Brothers, along with Ryder-Jones and Power, performing each other’s songs, new material, and cover versions of some of their favourite artists. Titled Bird Dog Tapes Volume 1, it was recorded in a single day and released two years later in 2016.

In 2018, they recorded their fifth album, Halfway Towards a Healing in Tucson Arizona with producers Howe Gelb and Gabriel Sullivan. The album was released to wide critical acclaim from leading music publications, including Mojo, Uncut, Record Collector, and Q Magazine.

In October 2019, The Lost Brothers announced that their sixth album, After The Fire After The Rain would be released in February 2020. The album was recorded in New York and produced by Bob Dylan cohort Tony Garnier and Daniel Schlett. They released an initial song from the album in October 2019, "Fugitive Moon", featuring M. Ward on guitar.

== Discography ==
- Trails of the Lonely (2008)
- So Long John Fante (2011)
- The Passing of the Night (2012)
- New Songs of Dawn and Dust (2014)
- Bird Dog Tapes (mini album) (2016)
- Halfway Towards a Healing (2018)
- After The Fire After The Rain (2020)
