= Lena in Hollywood =

Studio album by Lena Horne
- Released: 1966
- Recorded: 1965
- Genre: Traditional pop Vocal jazz
- Length: 31:51
- Label: United Artists
- Producer: Ray Ellis

Lena Horne chronology
Feelin' Good (1965)	Lena in Hollywood (1966)	Merry from Lena (1966)

Professional ratings
Review scores
Source	Rating
Allmusic	3/5 stars

Lena in Hollywood is a 1966 studio album by Lena Horne, arranged by Ray Ellis.

== Track listing ==
1. "Singin' in the Rain" (Nacio Herb Brown, Arthur Freed) – 2:51
2. "In Love in Vain" (Jerome Kern, Leo Robin) – 2:30
3. "Never on Sunday" (Manos Hadjidakis, Billy Towne) – 4:07
4. "Somewhere" (Leonard Bernstein, Stephen Sondheim) – 2:25
5. "All the Way" (Sammy Cahn, Jimmy Van Heusen) – 3:01
6. "Wives and Lovers" (Burt Bacharach, Hal David) – 2:11
7. "It Had Better Be Tonight" (Henry Mancini, Johnny Mercer, Franco Migliacci) – 2:17
8. "Moon River" (Mancini, Mercer) – 3:27
9. "A Fine Romance" (Dorothy Fields, Kern) – 2:56
10. "I Love Paris" (Cole Porter) – 3:26
11. "It's a Mad, Mad, Mad, Mad World" (Mack David, Ernest Gold) – 1:55

== Personnel ==
- Lena Horne – vocals
- Ray Ellis – arranger
