= You've Changed (1941 song) =

Song
- Published: 1942
- Songwriters: Bill Carey; Carl Fischer

"You've Changed" is a popular song published in 1942 with music by Carl Fischer and words by Bill Carey. The melody features descending chromaticism. The song was first recorded on October 24, 1941 by Harry James & His Orchestra (vocal by Dick Haymes).

== Cover versions ==
The song has since been recorded by many artists, including Billie Holiday on her 1958 album Lady in Satin. A recording by Connie Russell briefly reached the Billboard charts in 1954.
