= Feelin' Good (Lena Horne album) =

Studio album by Lena Horne
- Released: 1965
- Recorded: 1965
- Genre: Traditional pop Vocal jazz
- Length: 31:51
- Label: United Artists
- Producer: Ray Ellis

Lena Horne chronology
Here's Lena Now! (1964)	Feelin' Good (1965)	Lena in Hollywood (1966)

Feelin' Good is a 1965 studio album by Lena Horne, arranged by Ray Ellis and released on United Artists Records.

== Reception ==
Professional ratings
Review scores
Source	Rating
Allmusic	3.5/5 stars
Record Mirror	3/5 stars

The Allmusic review by William Ruhlmann awarded the album three and a half stars and said that "Feelin' Good was a typical effort as she (Horne) and arranger/producer Ray Ellis surveyed the current state of pop and show music to find some new items for her repertoire...To this material, Ellis applied neo-swing big-band arrangements, and Horne applied her characteristic vocal attitude and punch. It wasn't enough to make listeners forget the sometimes definitive recordings of these songs done earlier by others, but Horne was, as usual, a powerful enough musical personality to stake her claim to them stylishly and confidently".

== Track listing ==
1. "A Wonderful Day Like Today" (Anthony Newley, Leslie Bricusse)
2. "Take the Moment" (Richard Rodgers, Stephen Sondheim)
3. "I Wanna Be Around" (Sadie Vimmerstedt, Johnny Mercer)
4. "Feeling Good" (Newley, Bricusse)
5. "Pleasures and Palaces" (Frank Loesser)
6. "Who Can I Turn To?" (Newley, Bricusse)
7. "Less Than a Second" (Ray Ellis, George David Weiss)
8. "Willow Weep for Me" (Ann Ronnell)
9. "The Boy from Ipanema" (Vinícius de Moraes, Norman Gimbel, Antônio Carlos Jobim)
10. "Softly as I Leave You" (Hal Shaper, Antonio De Vita, Giorgio Calabrese)
11. "And I Love Him" (John Lennon, Paul McCartney)
12. "Hello Young Lovers" (Rodgers, Oscar Hammerstein II)

== Personnel ==
- Lena Horne – vocals
- Ray Ellis – arranger
