= Merry from Lena =

Studio album by Lena Horne
- Released: November 1966
- Recorded: 1966
- Genre: Christmas music; traditional pop; vocal jazz
- Length: 31:51
- Label: United Artists
- Producer: Ray Ellis

Lena Horne chronology
Lena in Hollywood (1966)	Merry from Lena (1966)	Soul (1966)

Professional ratings
Review scores
Source	Rating
AllMusic	3/5 stars

Merry from Lena is a 1966 album by Lena Horne. Released in 1966, this Christmas album marked Horne's departure from United Artists Records and the recording industry until her return at Skye Records in 1970.

The album was reissued on CD by Capitol (1990), Razor & Tie (1995), and DRG (2007). All CD issues of the album include a bonus track, "Santa Claus Is Comin' to Town", which was not included on the original LP.

== Track listing ==
=== Original release ===
1. "Jingle All the Way" (Ray Ellis, Al Stillman) – 2:36
2. "The Christmas Song" (Mel Tormé, Bob Wells) – 3:19
3. "Winter Wonderland" (Felix Bernard, Richard B. Smith) – 2:11
4. "White Christmas" (Irving Berlin) – 2:42
5. "Let It Snow! Let It Snow! Let It Snow!" (Sammy Cahn, Jule Styne) – 2:23
6. "The Little Drummer Boy" (Katherine K. Davis) – 2:26
7. "Rudolph the Red-Nosed Reindeer" (Johnny Marks) – 3:15
8. "What Are You Doing New Year's Eve?" (Frank Loesser) – 2:40
9. "Have Yourself a Merry Little Christmas" (Ralph Blane, Hugh Martin) – 3:39
10. "Silent Night" (Franz Gruber, Josef Mohr) – 2:41

=== CD bonus track ===
11. "Santa Claus Is Comin' to Town" (J. Fred Coots, Haven Gillespie) – 2:59

== Personnel ==
- Lena Horne – vocals
- Jack Parnell – orchestration, conductor
