= Kyle Field (musician) =

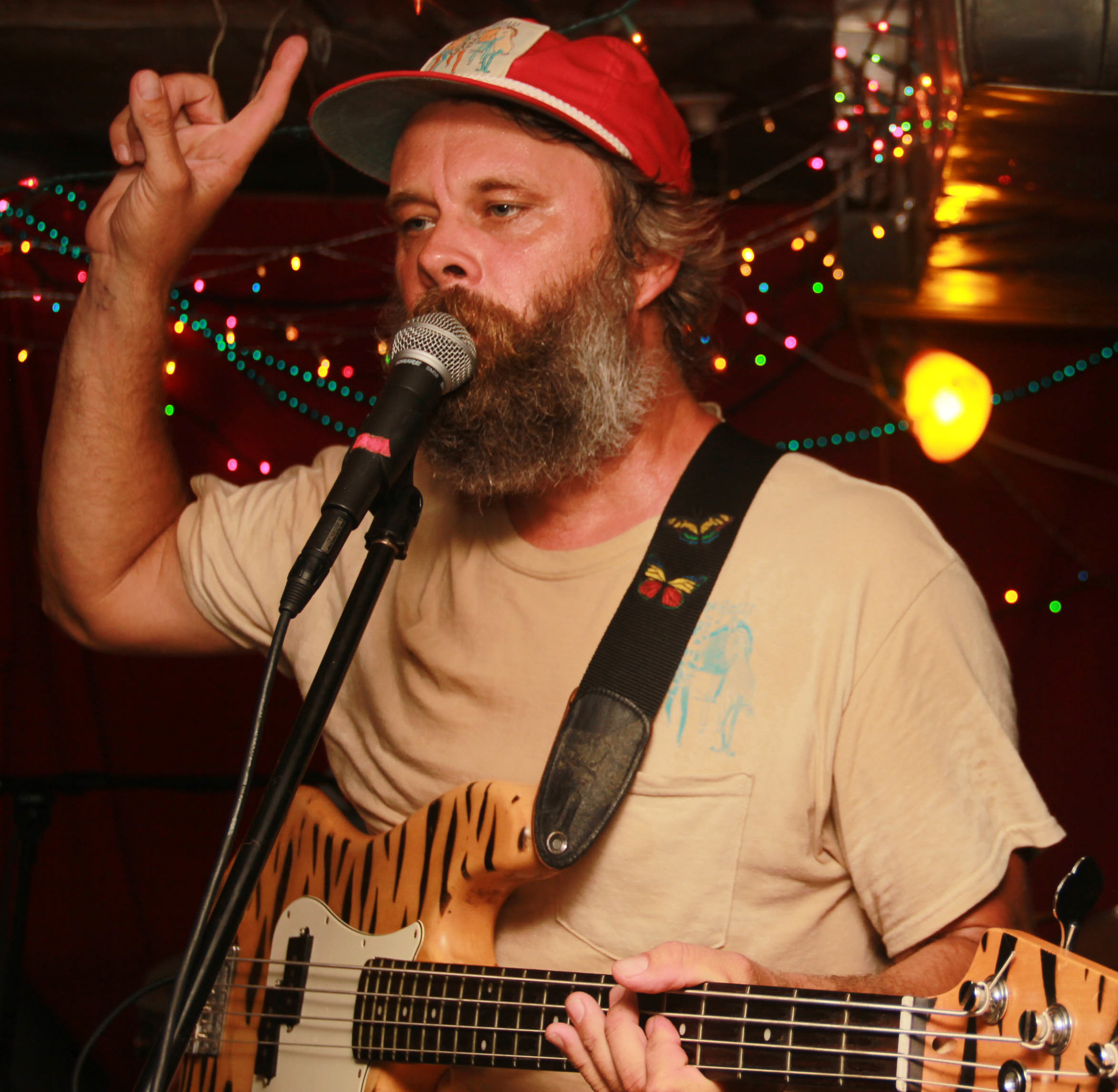
- Kyle Field performing as Little Wings in West Philadelphia, 2017.

Background information
- Born: Kyle Field; November 22, 1972 (age 53); Alabama, United States
- Genres: Indie rock, folk
- Occupations: Singer-songwriter, musician
- Instruments: Vocals, guitar, bass guitar
- Years active: Late 1990s–present
- Website: http://www.littlewingsnow.com/

Kyle Field is an American musician who releases material under the moniker Little Wings.

== Early life ==
Field was born in Alabama in 1972. As a child, his family relocated to Los Angeles, California, where his father worked as a coach for the UCLA Bruins.

== Career ==
=== Music ===
Field contributed bass and vocals in the band Rodriguez, along with M. Ward and Mike Funk.

In the late 1990s in San Luis Obispo, California, Field formed the band Little Wings, of which he is the only permanent member. In the past, the band has had members Adam Selzer on drums, Rob Kieswetter (a.k.a. Bobby Birdman) on keyboards, Mark Leece as bassist and various others. As Little Wings, Field has released over a dozen albums, under the Walking and independent K Records labels. Field also has played with Grandaddy, Lee Baggett, André Herman Dune, Peaches and Devendra Banhart throughout the 2000s.

Little Wings influenced the band Real Estate.

=== Visual art ===
Field is also an acclaimed visual artist, having earned his BFA in 1997 from the University of California, Los Angeles. His first book of drawings was released on the label Ahornfelder.

== Personal life ==
Kyle Field lives near San Francisco, California.

== Discography ==
As Little Wings:

- Discover Worlds Of Wonder [KLP154] (2000)
- The Wonder City [KYO46] (2002)
- Wonderue [KLP134] (2002)
- Light Green Leaves [KLP139] (2002)
- Harvest Joy [KLP152] (2003)
- Magic Wand [KLP161] (2004)
- Grow [KLP169] (2005)
- Soft Pow'r [RAD001] (2007)
- Black Grass [RAD005] (2011)
- Last [RAD007] (2013)
- Made it Rain [GNM-022] (2013)
- Light Green Leaves [GNM-034] (reissue 2015)
- Explains [WOODSIST077] (2015)
- People [Self Released] (2019)
- Ropes in Paradise [PIAPTK] (2019)
- Zephyr [SC05] (2022)
- High On The Glade [PD077] (2024)

Has appeared on:

- Calvin Johnson and The Sons of the Soil, Calvin Johnson and The Sons of the Soil [KLP180] (2007)
- The Microphones, Mount Eerie [KLP140] (2003)
- The Microphones, Song Islands [KLP125] (2002)
- Tapir!, The Pilgrim, Their God and The King of My Decrepit Mountain [HVNLP220] (2024)
