= A Wasteland Companion =

Studio album by M. Ward
- Released: April 6, 2012
- Genre: Pop, rock
- Length: 36:47
- Label: Merge, Bella Union, Spunk
- Producer: M. Ward

M. Ward chronology
| Hold Time (2009) | A Wasteland Companion (2012) | More Rain (2016) |

Professional ratings
Aggregate scores
| Source | Rating |
|---|---|
| Metacritic | 75/100 |
Review scores
| Source | Rating |
| Pitchfork | 6.3/10 |
| NME | 7/10 |
| Under the Gun Review | 8/10 |

A Wasteland Companion is the seventh studio album from M. Ward, released in Australia and New Zealand on April 6, 2012; in the United Kingdom on April 9, 2012; and in the United States on April 10, 2012. A Wasteland Companion is the follow-up to his 2009 album Hold Time.

A Wasteland Companion was recorded in eight studios in the United States and the United Kingdom. M. Ward promoted the new album on his 2012 European and American tour, March 20 to May 24.

The album garnered a rating of 75 out of 100 from critics as compiled by Metacritic.

== Track listing ==
1. "Clean Slate" - 2:51
2. "Primitive Girl" - 3:10
3. "Me and My Shadow" - 2:36
4. "Sweetheart" (Daniel Johnston) - 3:31
5. "I Get Ideas" - 2:39
6. "The First Time I Ran Away" - 3:17
7. "A Wasteland Companion" - 2:54
8. "Watch the Show" - 3:40
9. "There's a Key" - 2:57
10. "Crawl After You" - 3:41
11. "Wild Goose" - 2:35
12. "Pure Joy" - 2:57

== Personnel ==
- M. Ward – guitar, piano, vocals
- Zooey Deschanel – vocals
- Susan Sanchez – backing vocals
- Rachel Cox – backing vocals
- Toby Leaman – bass
- Tyler Tornfelt – bass
- Mike Coykendall – percussion, bass, acoustic guitar
- John Parish – percussion, marimba
- Jordan Hudson – percussion
- Steve Shelley – percussion
- Scott McPherson – percussion
- John Graboff – pedal steel
- Howe Gelb – piano
- Nathan Jr. Andersen – piano
- Mike Mogis – organ, orchestra bells
- Tom Hagerman – strings
- Amanda Lawrence – violin

== Charts ==
| Chart (2012) | Peak position |
|---|---|
| Belgian Albums (Ultratop Flanders) | 33 |
| Spanish Albums (Promusicae) | 51 |
| Swedish Albums (Sverigetopplistan) | 35 |
| US Billboard 200 | 21 |
| US Top Alternative Albums (Billboard) | 9 |
| US Digital Albums (Billboard) | 16 |
| US Independent Albums (Billboard) | 5 |
| US Top Rock Albums (Billboard) | 10 |
| US Indie Store Album Sales (Billboard) | 4 |
| US Vinyl Albums (Billboard) | 2 |
