= Tapir! =

English indie folk band (2019–2025)

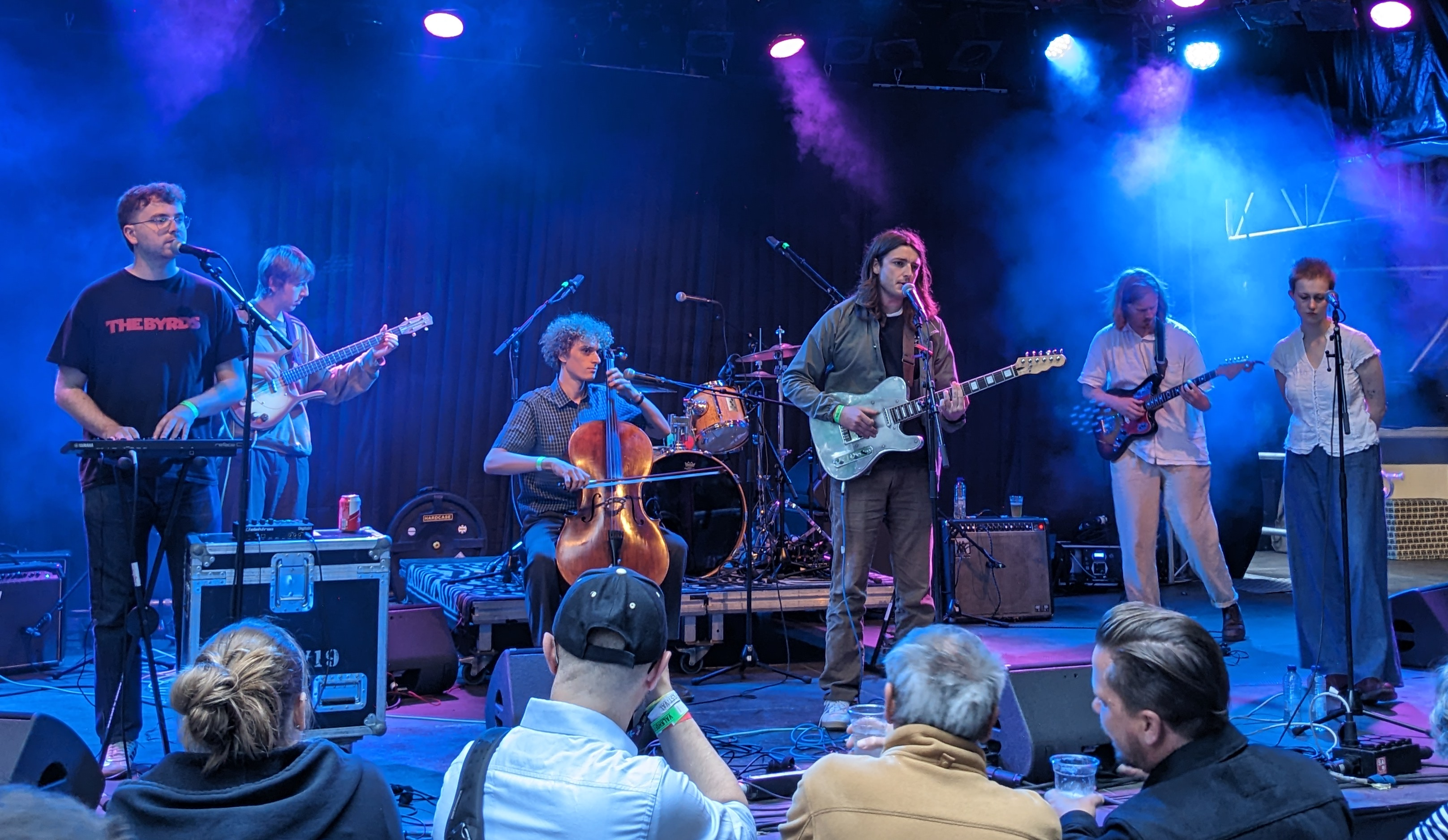
- Tapir! performing in July 2023

Background information
- Origin: London, England
- Genres: Folk; indie folk; art pop
- Years active: 2019–2025
- Label: Heavenly
- Members: Evelyn Gray; Ronnie Longfellow; Emily Hubbard; Tom Rogers-Coltman; Will McCrossan; Wilfred Cartwright
- Website: tapirband.co.uk

Tapir! were an English indie folk band, formed in London in 2019. They were known for their blending of folk music with genres such as post-punk and art pop, as well as the narratives told in their music. Their practice of wearing red papier-mâché heads during performances and interviews was often noted by reviewers as part of the band's eccentricity.

Tapir! formed in 2019, and released their first single, "My God", in 2022. They then released two EPs, Act 1 (The Pilgrim) and Act 2 (Their God). Both EPs were included in their only full-length album, The Pilgrim, Their God and the King of My Decrepit Mountain, released on 26 January 2024; the album received generally positive reviews. They released two more singles - "Hallelujah Bruv" and "Nail in a Wooden Trunk" - in 2024, before announcing on 27 May 2025 that they would be disbanding.

Tapir! have been praised for their eccentricity and overall aesthetic, as well as the narratives included in their music. The Pilgrim tells the story of the titular Pilgrim travelling through a world of green hills and red beasts, and was described by DIY as "an escapist dream, and immersive story". Their music has been compared to folk art and pagan ceremonies; many aspects of their lyrics were inspired by biblical, mythical, and literary sources.

== Career ==
Tapir! consisted of six musicians based in South London, many of whom were a part of other projects. The band formed in 2019 and began releasing music three years later; they released "My God", written during the COVID-19 pandemic, as their first single, and the EP Act 1 (The Pilgrim) in 2022. These were both later re-released, with "My God" becoming a single for their first album and Act 1 (The Pilgrim) being remastered and re-released to coincide with the signing of the band to Heavenly Recordings in May 2023.

Tapir! began playing live shows in 2022, opening for Ian Sweet in May. In August, they performed at Green Man Festival. In March 2023, they were announced as part of the October Left of the Dial festival. On 8 November, Tapir! opened a concert for post-rock band Explosions in the Sky at Troxy.

Tapir!'s only album, The Pilgrim, Their God and the King of My Decrepit Mountain, was released on 26 January 2024. It is composed of three acts: their two previous EPs – Act 1 (The Pilgrim) and Act 2 (Their God) – plus four songs in a third act exclusive to the full album. The first song of each act contains narration by Kyle Field. The album tells the story of "The Pilgrim", a creature travelling through a fictional world of green hills and red beasts. The album was described by DIY as "immersed in the cinematic, the mythological and the art of experimenting... an escapist dream, and immersive story".

On 15 August 2024, Tapir! released a new track, "Hallelujah Bruv". It was recorded with Yuri Shibuichi and Hywel Pryer, who had previously worked with the band. On 17 September, they released the single "Nail in a Wooden Trunk".

On 27 May 2025, Tapir! announced that they would be disbanding, stating that they had "completed the project that [they] set out to achieve and then some". They stated that part of the reason for disbanding was so that the band's vocalist, Evelyn Gray, could focus on their gender transition, and that many of the band members were "at different stages of [their] lives from when [they] first began the band".

== Musical style and reception ==
Clash describes Tapir! as "blend[ing] post-punk with folk, indie with skittering electronics" and as art pop. Describing the track "Gymnopédie", Circuit Sweet called its climax "a glorious lo-fi symphony that sounds like it's performed teetering on the edge of a cliff". Writing for Hideous Magazine, Angelika May wrote of the song "My God" that it "exudes an abundance of esotericism and eccentricity, offering intricate and thorough conceptions that make you want to crack open their crimson, mammalian heads in an attempt to understand their process". In a review of the 2022 version of Act 1 for Hard of Hearing Magazine, Lloyd Bolton compared the music's aesthetic to folk art, saying "amid the crackle, artless singalongs create the impression of a fictional pagan ceremony, celebrating the folklore of this imaginary region".

Many of the drums in Tapir!'s music are electronic, although they did have a drummer when playing live. Much of the lyrical inspiration on Act 2 is from biblical, mythical, and literary sources, such as the track "Eidolon" being inspired by a Walt Whitman poem. The band often wore red papier-mâché heads online and for live performances, representing the character of the Pilgrim.

== Members ==
All info per PIAS and Wax Music.

- Evelyn Gray – vocals, guitar
- Ronnie Longfellow – bass guitar
- Emily Hubbard – cornet, synths
- Tom Rogers-Coltman – guitar
- Will McCrossan – keyboard
- Wilfred Cartwright – drums, cello

== Discography ==
=== Albums ===
- The Pilgrim, Their God and the King of My Decrepit Mountain (2024)

=== EPs ===
- Act 1 (The Pilgrim) (2022, re-released 2023)
- Act 2 (Their God) (2023)

=== Singles ===
- "My God" (2022, re-released 2023)
- "On a Grassy Knoll (We'll Bow Together)" (2023)
- "Gymnopédie" (2023)
- "Hallelujah Bruv" (2024)
- "Nail in a Wooden Trunk" (2024)
