= A Fine Romance (song) =

1936 song by Jerome Kern

Song by Fred Astaire
- B-side: "The Waltz in Swing Time"
- Published: 1936 by Chappell & Co.
- Released: August 1936
- Recorded: July 28, 1936
- Studio: Los Angeles, California
- Genre: Jazz, Pop Vocal
- Label: Brunswick 7716
- Composer: Jerome Kern
- Lyricist: Dorothy Fields

Fred Astaire singles chronology
"I'm Putting All My Eggs in One Basket" (1936)	"A Fine Romance" (1936)	"The Way You Look Tonight" (1936)

"A Fine Romance"

Single by Billie Holiday and her Orchestra
- B-side: "I Can't Pretend"
- Released: 1936
- Recorded: September 29, 1936
- Genre: Jazz blues
- Length: 2.53
- Label: Vocalion 3333

Billie Holiday and her Orchestra singles chronology
"These Foolish Things (Remind Me of You)" (1936)	"A Fine Romance" (1936)	"The Way You Look Tonight" (1936)

A Fine Romance performed on tenor sax by Jules Grandgagnage

"A Fine Romance" is a popular song composed by Jerome Kern with lyrics by Dorothy Fields, published in 1936.

The song was written for the musical film, Swing Time, where it was co-introduced by Fred Astaire and Ginger Rogers. Astaire recorded a solo version of the song on July 28, 1936 for Brunswick records (catalog 7716) and it topped the charts of the day for five weeks. Billie Holiday recorded the song for Vocalion Records on September 29, 1936 and this too reached the charts of the day as did versions by Henry King and Guy Lombardo.

== Items referenced in the song ==
- SS Île de France -- ocean liner
- The March of Time -- news film series
- Seidlitz powders -- medication

== Other notable recordings ==
- Henry King and his Orchestra with vocals by Joe Sudy (1936)
- Bing Crosby and Dixie Lee Crosby with Victor Young & His Orchestra (recorded August 19, 1936)
- Marian McPartland – Lullaby of Birdland (1952)
- Fred Astaire – The Astaire Story (1953)
- Count Basie and Joe Williams – The Greatest!! Count Basie Plays, Joe Williams Sings Standards (1956)
- Mel Tormé – Mel Tormé Sings Fred Astaire (1956)
- Louis Armstrong and Ella Fitzgerald – Ella and Louis Again (1957)
- Sammy Davis Jr. and Carmen McRae – Boy Meets Girl (1957)
- Margaret Whiting – Margaret Whiting Sings the Jerome Kern Songbook (1960)
- Frank Sinatra – Ring-a-Ding-Ding! (1961)
- Lena Horne – Lena in Hollywood (1966)
- Susannah McCorkle – How Do You Keep the Music Playing (1985)
- Kiri Te Kanawa – Kiri Sings Kern (1993)
- Ann Hampton Callaway – To Ella with Love (1996)
- Skinnerbox - Demonstration (1998)
- Stacey Kent – Let Yourself Go: Celebrating Fred Astaire (2000)
- Marilyn Monroe– Diamonds Are a Girl's Best Friend (2006)

== Popular culture ==
- In the film Till the Clouds Roll By (1946), the song is performed by Virginia O'Brien.
- In a version sung by Judi Dench it also became the theme song of A Fine Romance, a British television series starring Dench and her husband Michael Williams.
- A recording by Lena Horne features in the film The Adventures of Priscilla, Queen of the Desert (1994). The song also features in the stage musical Priscilla Queen of the Desert – the Musical.
