= Rodriguez (band) =

- Origin: San Luis Obispo, California U.S.
- Genres: folk rock, neo-psychedelia, experimental rock, indie rock, lo-fi
- Years active: 1992–2000
- Label: Devil In The Woods
- Past members: Matt Ward, Kyle Field, Mike Funk, Jake Hockel, Sanjeev Srinivas

Rodriguez was a rock band active in the mid to late 1990s based in San Luis Obispo, California.

The band is notable as an early collaboration between Matt Ward (who later came to prominence as M. Ward) and Kyle Field (aka Little Wings), along with a series of drummers: Jake Hockel, Sanjeev Srinivas, and Mike Funk. The band was described by Field as "the band in which I learned how to play music".

They completed one full-length album, 2000's Swing Like A Metronome, which was produced by Jason Lytle of Grandaddy and released by independent label Devil in the Woods. The band also released a couple of songs recorded by Adam Selzer from the M. Ward band and Norfolk & Western. Co-dependent Records released the "Weren't a Problem" EP as a 7" in 1996 and a cassette entitled "Cash Crops and Box Plots" in 1995.

== Discography ==
=== Albums ===
- 2000: Swing Like A Metronome
