= Carl T. Fischer =

American jazz musician

- Born: Carl Theodore Fischer; April 9, 1912; Los Angeles, California, U.S.
- Died: March 27, 1954 (aged 41) Sherman Oaks, California, U.S.
- Genres: Jazz
- Occupations: Singer; songwriter
- Instrument: Vocals

Carl Theodore Fischer (April 9, 1912 – March 27, 1954) was a Cherokee jazz pianist and composer. He worked with Frankie Laine, and composed Laine's 1945 hit song "We'll Be Together Again", and "You've Changed" with lyrics by Bill Carey.

== Background ==
Fischer was born on April 9, 1912, in Los Angeles, California. Fischer's parents, of Cherokee descent, overcame poverty to provide him with music lessons.

== Musical career ==
At the age of 32, Fischer joined a touring band and wrote some minor hits, which led to his work as an accompanist for Laine. With Laine's encouragement, Fischer wrote the musical Tecumseh!, although it was never performed before Fischer's death.

== Family ==
Fischer's daughters, Carol and Terry, formed the Murmaids, the group that had a hit recording with "Popsicles and Icicles" in 1964.

== Death ==
Fischer died on March 27, 1954, in Sherman Oaks, California.
