= More Rain =

Studio album by M. Ward
- Released: March 4, 2016
- Genre: Americana, indie folk
- Length: 37:14
- Label: Merge

M. Ward chronology
A Wasteland Companion (2012)	More Rain (2016)	What a Wonderful Industry (2018)

More Rain is the eighth studio album by American singer-songwriter M. Ward. The album was released on March 4, 2016, on Merge Records and Bella Union. More Rain is Ward's first solo album since 2012's A Wasteland Companion, having released Volume Three and Classics with Zooey Deschanel as She & Him in the interim as well as recording and producing other artists.

== Background ==
Ward began working on More Rain in 2012, initially experimenting with layering his own vocals to create a doo-wop record. After collaborating with other artists on the record like Peter Buck, k.d. lang, and Neko Case, the sound of the album went in a different direction, described as "true gotta-stay-indoors, rainy-season record that looks upwards through the weather while reflecting on his past."

== Critical reception ==
Professional ratings
Review scores
Source	Rating
Exclaim!	7/10
Pitchfork	5.9/10

More Rain received a weighted average score of 72 out of 100, based on eleven critical reviews, by review aggregator Metacritic, indicating "generally favorable reviews". A review in the April 2016 issue of Uncut said, "The lack of ironic twists is both slightly unsettling and hugely refreshing," and David Harvey of Record Collector called the album "a dreamy deluge". Andrew Gordon of The Skinny said the album is "decisively easygoing", after saying, "If you're scanning these pages for a record your granny might be into, this is the one." Dean Van Nguyen of Consequence of Sound gave the album a D+, or a 33 out of 100 according to Metacritic, stating that, "All the expected points have been hit on More Rain, but the record comes off as slack and slapdash."

== Track listing ==
All songs written by M. Ward except "You're So Good to Me" written by Brian Wilson

No.	Title	Length
1.	"More Rain"	1:01
2.	"Pirate Dial"	2:46
3.	"Time Won't Wait"	2:49
4.	"Confession"	3:14
5.	"I'm Listening (Child's Theme)"	3:11
6.	"Girl from Conejo Valley"	3:35
7.	"Slow Driving Man"	4:24
8.	"You're So Good to Me"	3:04
9.	"Temptation"	2:50
10.	"Phenomenon"	3:10
11.	"Little Baby"	3:32
12.	"I'm Going Higher"	3:38
Total length:		37:14

== Personnel ==
- M. Ward – vocals, guitar, mandolin, keyboards
- Mike Coykendall – bass, guitar, percussion
- Joey Spampinato – bass
- Mark Powers – drums, percussion
- Scott McPherson – drums, percussion
- Mike Mogis – mandolin, pedal steel, Moog synthesizer
- Nathaniel Walcott – flugelhorn
- Paul Brainard – pedal steel, trumpet
- Peter Buck – guitar, mandolin
- Scott McCaughey – bass, guitar, organ
- Susan Sanchez – backing vocals
- The Secret Sisters – backing vocals
- k.d. lang – backing vocals
- Neko Case – backing vocals

== Charts ==
Chart (2016)	Peak position
Belgian Albums (Ultratop Flanders)	59
Belgian Albums (Ultratop Wallonia)	174
US Billboard 200	128
US Top Alternative Albums (Billboard)	13
US Americana/Folk Albums (Billboard)	4
US Independent Albums (Billboard)	7
US Top Rock Albums (Billboard)	16
US Indie Store Album Sales (Billboard)	7
US Vinyl Albums (Billboard)	14
