= The Pilgrim, Their God and the King of My Decrepit Mountain =

Studio album by Tapir!
- Released: 26 January 2024
- Genre: Indie folk
- Length: 44:24
- Label: Heavenly
- Producer: Joseph Futak; Yuri Shibuichi

Tapir! chronology
Act 2 (Their God) (2023)	The Pilgrim, Their God and the King of My Decrepit Mountain (2024)

The Pilgrim, Their God and the King of My Decrepit Mountain is the only studio album by British indie folk band Tapir!, released on 26 January 2024 through Heavenly Recordings. The album is divided into three acts: The Pilgrim, Their God, and The King of My Decrepit Mountain, of which the first two were released separately in May and August 2023, respectively. It received positive reviews from critics.

== Critical reception ==
Professional ratings
Aggregate scores
Source	Rating
Metacritic	72/100
Review scores
Source	Rating
AllMusic	4/5 stars
DIY	4/5 stars
Mojo	3/5 stars
MusicOMH	3/5 stars

The Pilgrim, Their God and the King of My Decrepit Mountain received a score of 72 out of 100 on review aggregator Metacritic based on four critics' reviews, indicating "generally favorable" reception. Mojo felt that "Tapir!'s considerable world-building skills impress, even if seven-minute closer 'Mountain Song' seems a little directionless". AllMusic's Marcy Donelson described the album as "a character-driven musical adventure involving mythical landscapes, a quest, and a growing ensemble to accommodate its offbeat art-folk", writing that "with each act consisting of a similar intro and three songs, it works well as an indie folk album, if a fanciful concept one with jittery drum machine patterns".

Reviewing the album for DIY, Neive McCarthy wrote that "immersed in the cinematic, the mythological and the art of experimenting, Tapir's debut an ode to the power music has to transport. Here they've created a captivating universe." David Murphy of MusicOMH found the album to be "a collection of three EPs of bucolic, understated indie folk which tell a somewhat inscrutable epic story, and the first of these, Act 1 (The Pilgrim), sets the tone, but lowers the expectations", concluding that "people often say that the first episode of a sit-com is disappointing, and you should skip to the second, which is exactly the approach we propose for this album".

== Track listing ==
The Pilgrim, Their God and the King of My Decrepit Mountain disc 1 track listing
No.	Title	Length
1.	"Act 1 (The Pilgrim)" (with Little Wings)	1:39
2.	"On a Grassy Knoll (We'll Bow Together)"	4:19
3.	"Swallow"	4:12
4.	"The Nether (Face to Face)"	3:56

Disc 2 track listing
No.	Title	Length
1.	"Act 2 (Their God)" (with Little Wings)	2:07
2.	"Broken Ark"	4:34
3.	"Gymnopédie"	3:50
4.	"Eidolon"	3:30

Disc 3 track listing
No.	Title	Length
1.	"Act 3 (The King of My Decrepit Mountain)" (with Little Wings)	2:04
2.	"Untitled"	3:33
3.	"My God"	3:21
4.	"Mountain Song"	7:19
Total length:		44:24

== Charts ==
Chart performance for The Pilgrim, Their God and the King of My Decrepit Mountain
Chart (2024)	Peak position
UK Independent Albums (OCC)	29
