= Think of Spring =

Studio album by M. Ward
- Released: December 11, 2020
- Genre: Folk
- Length: 37:36
- Label: Anti-

M. Ward chronology
Migration Stories (2020)	Think of Spring (2020)	Supernatural Thing (2023)

Professional ratings
Aggregate scores
Source	Rating
Metacritic	70/100.
Review scores
Source	Rating
AllMusic	3/5 stars
The Guardian	3/5 stars
Pitchfork	7.0/10
Mojo	80/100

Think of Spring, released in 2020, is the eleventh studio album by singer-songwriter M. Ward. The album is a tribute to Billie Holiday’s 1958 album Lady in Satin.

Think of Spring includes all the tracks from Lady In Satin except for Glad to Be Unhappy and The End of a Love Affair and includes All The Way, which was recorded by Holiday and released on her 1959 album Last Recording.

== Background ==
Ward began listening to Holiday's music at an early age but first heard Lady in Satin at the age of 15 playing in a shopping mall. Her voice sounded to him like "a beautiful perfectly distorted electric guitar—some other-world thing floating there on this strange mournful ocean of strings". He later described the experience to be dream-like.

Ward had been working on a tribute to Lady in Satin for quite some time but was able to finish it in 2020 from home after his planned world tour was canceled due to the COVID-19 pandemic. All the songs were recorded on a Tascam Portastudio four-track cassette recorder that he had purchased at the age of 15. The analog recording technique was intended to give the album a personal sound.

Many of the songs were recording using alternate guitar tunings.

== Track listing ==
No.	Title	Length
1.	"I Get Along Without You Very Well"	04:02
2.	"For Heaven's Sake"	03:32
3.	"It's Easy to Remember"	03:21
4.	"You've Changed"	03:23
5.	"Violets for Your Furs"	04:39
6.	"For All We Know"	02:57
7.	"But Beautiful"	03:11
8.	"All the Way"	02:47
9.	"I'm a Fool to Want You"	04:16
10.	"I'll Be Around"	02:25
11.	"You Don't Know What Love Is"	03:03
