= The Essential Billie Holiday: Carnegie Hall Concert Recorded Live =

Live album by Billie Holiday
- Released: 1961 (expanded CD 1989)
- Recorded: November 10, 1956
- Venue: Carnegie Hall, New York City
- Genre: Vocal jazz
- Length: 44:40
- Label: Verve
- Producer: Norman Granz

Billie Holiday chronology
Last Recording (1959)	The Essential Billie Holiday: Carnegie Hall Concert Recorded Live (1961)

The Essential Billie Holiday: Carnegie Hall Concert Recorded Live is a live album by jazz singer Billie Holiday, recorded on November 10, 1956, at Carnegie Hall in New York City. The two sets promoted Billie Holiday's autobiography, Lady Sings the Blues.

== Content ==
Between songs, Gilbert Millstein of The New York Times read aloud four lengthy passages from her autobiography, Lady Sings the Blues. The narrated parts of the concerts were not included until the re-release on CD in 1989.

The autobiography was ghostwritten. Norman Granz, her manager, suspected she had never read it.

In the liner notes of the album Millstein wrote:

The narration began with the ironic account of her birth in Baltimore – 'Mom and Pop were just a couple of kids when they got married. He was eighteen, she was sixteen, and I was three' – and ended, very nearly shyly, with her hope for love and a long life with 'my man' at her side...It was evident, even then, that Miss Holiday was ill. I had known her casually over the years and I was shocked at her physical weakness. Her rehearsal had been desultory; her voice sounded tinny and trailed off; her body sagged tiredly. But I will not forget the metamorphosis that night. The lights went down, the musicians began to play and the narration began. Miss Holiday stepped from between the curtains, into the white spotlight awaiting her, wearing a white evening gown and white gardenias in her black hair. She was erect and beautiful; poised and smiling. And when the first section of narration was ended, she sang – with strength undiminished – with all of the art that was hers. I was very much moved. In the darkness, my face burned and my eyes. I recall only one thing. I smiled.

The critic Nat Hentoff of DownBeat, who attended the Carnegie Hall concert, wrote the remainder of the sleeve notes on the 1961 album. He wrote of Holiday's performance:

Throughout the night, Billie was in superior form to what had sometimes been the case in the last years of her life. Not only was there assurance of phrasing and intonation; but there was also an outgoing warmth, a palpable eagerness to reach and touch the audience. And there was mocking wit. A smile was often lightly evident on her lips and her eyes as if, for once, she could accept the fact that there were people who did dig her...The beat flowed in her uniquely sinuous, supple way of moving the story along; the words became her own experiences; and coursing through it all was Lady's sound – a texture simultaneously steel-edged and yet soft inside; a voice that was almost unbearably wise in disillusion and yet still childlike, again at the centre. The audience was hers from before she sang, greeting her and saying good-bye with heavy, loving applause. And at one time, the musicians too applauded. It was a night when Billie was on top, undeniably the best and most honest jazz singer alive.

== Track listing ==
LP (Verve)

Side A

1. "Lady Sings the Blues" (Holiday, Herbie Nichols) – 2:38
2. "Ain't Nobody's Business If I Do" (Porter Grainger, Everett Robbins) – 2:30
3. "Please Don't Talk About Me When I'm Gone" (Sam H. Stept, Sidney Clare, Bee Palmer) – 1:43
4. "I'll Be Seeing You" (Sammy Fain, Irving Kahal) – 2:18
5. "I Love My Man" (Holiday) – 3:18
6. "Body and Soul" (Edward Heyman, Robert Sour, Frank Eyton, Johnny Green) – 2:40

Side B

1. "Don't Explain" (Holiday, Arthur Herzog Jr.) – 2:26
2. "Yesterdays" (Jerome Kern, Otto Harbach) – 1:01
3. "My Man" (Jacques Charles, Channing Pollock, Albert Willemetz, Maurice Yvain) – 3:13
4. "I Cried for You" (Gus Arnheim, Arthur Freed, Abe Lyman) – 3:09
5. "Fine and Mellow" (Holiday) – 3:15
6. "I Cover the Waterfront" (Green, Heyman) – 3:46
7. "What a Little Moonlight Can Do" (Harry M. Woods) – 2:43

CD (Verve, 1989)

1. "Reading from Lady Sings the Blues" – 2:52
2. "Lady Sings the Blues" (Holiday, Nichols) – 2:38
3. "Ain't Nobody's Business If I Do" (Grainger, Robbins) – 2:33
4. "Reading from Lady Sings the Blues/Trav'lin' Light" (Trummy Young, Jimmy Mundy, Johnny Mercer) – 0:44
5. "Reading from Lady Sings the Blues" – 2:06
6. "Billie's Blues" (Holiday) – 3:20
7. "Body and Soul" (Heyman, Sour, Eyton, Green) – 2:41
8. "Reading from Lady Sings the Blues" – 0:55
9. "Don't Explain" (Holiday, Herzog) – 2:30
10. "Yesterdays" (Kern, Harbach) – 1:16
11. "Please Don't Talk About Me When I'm Gone" (Stept, Clare, Palmer) – 1:43
12. "I'll Be Seeing You" (Fain, Kahal) – 2:28
13. "Reading from Lady Sings the Blues" – 2:50
14. "My Man" (Charles, Pollock, Willemetz, Yvain) – 3:13
15. "I Cried for You" (Arnheim, Freed, Lyman) – 3:09
16. "Fine and Mellow" (Holiday) – 3:15
17. "I Cover the Waterfront" (Green, Heyman) – 3:46
18. "What a Little Moonlight Can Do" (Woods) – 2:49

== Personnel ==
Billie Holiday with the Chico Hamilton Quintet

- Billie Holiday, vocals
- Carl Drinkard, piano
- Kenny Burrell, guitar
- Carson Smith, bass
- Chico Hamilton, drums
- Narration by Gilbert Millstein

on tracks 1–9 (CD) with

- Roy Eldridge, trumpet
- Coleman Hawkins, tenor sax
- Tony Scott, piano

on tracks 10–18 with

- Buck Clayton, trumpet
- Al Cohn, tenor sax
- Tony Scott, clarinet
