= Soul (Lena Horne album) =

Studio album by Lena Horne
- Released: November 1966
- Recorded: 1966
- Genre: Pop, soul
- Length: 31:51
- Label: United Artists
- Producer: Ray Ellis

Lena Horne chronology
Merry from Lena (1966)	Soul (1966)	Lena & Gabor (1970)

Professional ratings
Review scores
Source	Rating
Allmusic	2/5 stars

Soul is a 1966 studio album by Lena Horne, arranged by Ray Ellis. Soul was the third of four albums Lena Horne recorded for United Artists Records. Recorded between September 9, 1965, and March 11, 1966, and released in June 1966. The album was re-issued on CD in 1996 by EMI and re-released by DRG in 2007 with six bonus tracks.

== Track listing ==
1. "I Got a Worried Man" (Ray Ellis, Al Stillman) – 3:06
2. "Wonder What I'm Gonna Do" (Jimmy Briggs, Larry Harrison) – 2:54
3. "I'd Like to Hear It Sometime" (Freddy Johnson, Leroy Kirkland, Pearl Woods) – 2:25
4. "What the World Needs Now Is Love" (Burt Bacharach, Hal David) – 2:25
5. "Unchained Melody" (Alex North, Hy Zaret) – 2:59
6. "Let the Little People Talk" (Buddy Kaye, Philip Springer) – 2:53
7. "Love Bug" (Don Covay) – 2:14
8. "A Taste of Honey" (Bobby Scott, Ric Marlow) – 3:13
9. "The Old Mill Stream" (Marc Lee Ellis, Rebert H. Harris) – 2:50
10. "Like a Child" (Jimmy Briggs, Larry Harrison) – 2:44
11. "The Music of the World a Turnin'" (Estelle Levitt, Don Thomas) – 2:44
12. "You Know What to Do" (Herbie Hancock, B. Townes) – 2:48

=== CD bonus tracks ===
13. "The Sand and the Sea" (Charles Blackwell) – 2:34 Previously only available on United Artists Records 45rpm single UA 911
14. "I Get Along Without You Very Well" (Hoagy Carmichael) – 3:29 Previously only available on the United Artist Records album UAD 60091/2, "The Lena Horne Collection"
15. "On Green Dolphin Street" (Bronislaw Kaper, Ned Washington) – 2:40 Previously only available on the United Artist Records album UAD 60091/2, "The Lena Horne Collection"
16. "I Keep Forgetting You" (Matt Dubey, Dean Fuller) – 2:32 Previously unreleased
17. "Unforeseen Hands" (Feagen) Previously unreleased
18. "Dream Child" (Peter Rafelson, David Williams) Previously unreleased

== Personnel ==
- Lena Horne – vocals
- Howell Conant – cover photography
