= M. Ward =

American musician

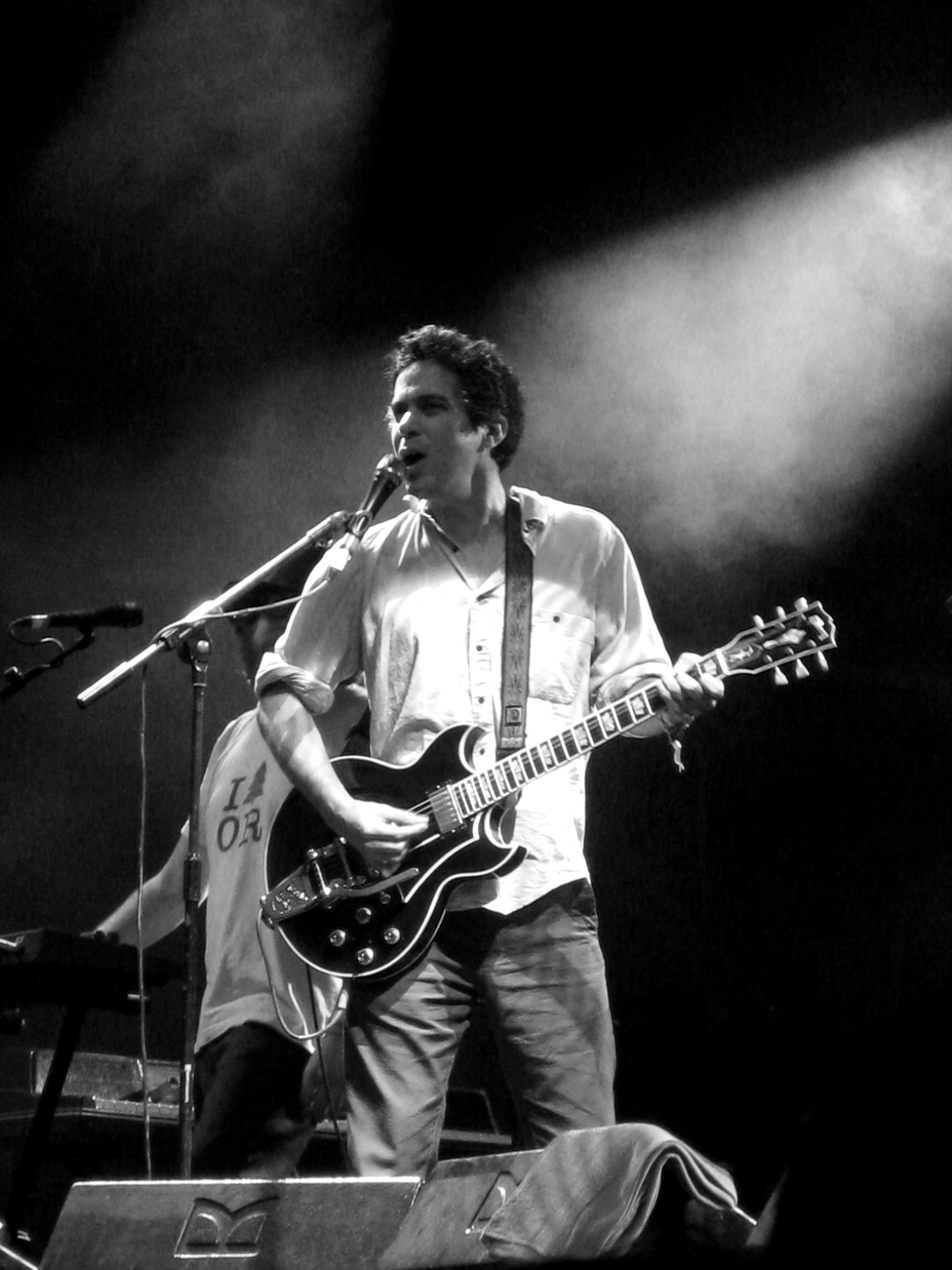
- Ward performing at the Glastonbury Festival, June 27, 2009

Background information
- Born: Matthew Stephen Ward; October 4, 1973 (age 53); Glendale, California, U.S.
- Genres: Indie folk; alternative country; American primitive guitar
- Occupations: Singer-songwriter; guitarist
- Instruments: Vocals; guitar; bass; harmonica; piano; keyboards; mandolin; xylophone; percussion
- Years active: 1999–present
- Labels: Merge; 4AD; Matador; Arts & Crafts México; Bella Union; Anti-
- Member of: She & Him
- Formerly of: Monsters of Folk
- Website: mwardmusic.com

Matthew Stephen Ward (born October 4, 1973) is an American singer-songwriter, Grammy nominated producer and guitarist from Glendale, California. Ward's solo work is a mixture of folk and blues-inspired Americana analog recordings. He has released 12 studio albums since 1999, primarily through the independent label Merge Records. In addition to his solo work, he is a member of indie pop duo She & Him and folk-rock supergroup Monsters of Folk, and also participates in recording, producing, and playing with multiple other artists.

== Early life ==
Ward was born on October 4, 1973, in Glendale, California, a suburb of Los Angeles. He later moved to Ventura County, and attended Newbury Park High School. He went to college at Cal Poly San Luis Obispo, and later moved to Portland, Oregon, to pursue his music career. Growing up, Ward taught himself songs by the Beatles on his brother's guitar, and began recording demos on a four-track analog tape recorder when he was about fifteen. Ward continues to record only analog, and starts all of his songs as demos on the same recorder he has had since his teens. In a 2007 interview with Exclaim magazine, Noel Gallagher of Oasis called M. Ward’s “Post War” album “One of the best albums I’ve ever heard actually.” link

== Solo recordings ==
=== Duets for Guitars #2 and End of Amnesia (1999–2001) ===
Ward's solo debut, Duet for Guitars #2, was released by Co-Dependent Records in 1999, then reissued by Howe Gelb's Ow Om record label in 2000. Described by Joshua Klein of Pitchfork as "ragged and lo-fi ... recorded on a shoestring and not necessarily worse for it", Duet for Guitars #2 soon went out of print for a second time, before being reissued by Merge in 2007.

Ward's second album, End of Amnesia, was put out by Future Farmer Records and Loose Music (Europe) in 2001. In a retrospective review, Ryan Kearney of Pitchfork compared the album to a contemporary band, Sparklehorse, saying that "both Linkous and Ward are country-and folk-influenced artists who scratch unavoidable, but nominally disruptive marks on the traditional blueprint". Sparklehorse had released It's a Wonderful Life to critical acclaim earlier in the year.

A collection of live recordings, Live Music & The Voice of Strangers, was a self-released disc that was sold at his shows in 2001.

=== Transfiguration of Vincent and Transistor Radio (2003–05) ===
Ward released his third album, Transfiguration of Vincent, on Merge Records in 2003 to critical success. Transfiguration of Vincent received a weighted average score of 82 out of 100 by review aggregator website Metacritic, based on 13 critical reviews, indicating "universal acclaim". The title alludes to the 1965 album The Transfiguration of Blind Joe Death by John Fahey, and refers to the life and death of Vincent O'Brien, a close friend to Ward. Fahey's pre-war style of folk music and production techniques, using basic equipment and simple arrangements, greatly influenced Ward's own sound and recording practices.

Transistor Radio, Ward's fourth album, was released on Merge in 2005, and he served as the opening act for The White Stripes that fall. The album consists of Ward's own compositions as well as three covers, The Beach Boys' "You Still Believe in Me", Carmen Lombardo's pop standard "Sweethearts on Parade", and Bach's "Well-Tempered Clavier". Transistor Radio received a score of 78 out of 100 on Metacritic, indicating "generally favorable reviews". Josh Terry of Consequence of Sound, writing of Transistor Radio in 2014, described the album as "one of the finer examples of ramshackle and intimate mid-aughts folk." A writer for Alternative Press, however, said that "Most of Ward's quiet, contemporary folk songs are mere sketches, mediocre if not unmemorable." Transistor Radio was reissued by Merge in December 2014 with four previously unreleased tracks.

=== Post-War and Hold Time (2006–09) ===
In August 2006, Ward released Post-War on Merge Records. Post-War was Ward's first album with a full backing band, with players including Howe Gelb, Jim James, and Neko Case. Post-War was described by Vanity Fair in its August 2006 issue as thematic on the question "How will America heal once this craziness in Iraq is over?" Ward said in that article that he looked to the post-war music of the late 1940s and 1950s. "I had the naive, simplistic idea that producers and writers and artists of the time helped in a minuscule way to change the mind-set of America." In addition to this inspired material, the album also contains a cover of Daniel Johnston's "To Go Home", which was subsequently re-released on the To Go Home EP in 2007. A critical success, Post-War received "universal acclaim" of 81 out of 100, aggregated by Metacritic and reached No. 146 on Billboard's Top 200. Ward spent most of 2007 touring with Norah Jones in support of the album, as well as occasionally playing in Norah's touring band, "The Handsome Band". Ward played on Jones's 2007 release Not Too Late.

Hold Time, the followup to Post-War, was released on Merge in February 2009. Hold Time includes guest performances by Jason Lytle of the band Grandaddy, Lucinda Williams, Tom Hagerman of DeVotchKa, and She & Him co-contributor Zooey Deschanel. The album includes a cover of the Buddy Holly song "Rave On!" Described by Autumn De Wilde Entertainment Weekly as "[feeling] timeless, a musical wanderer's dusty, train-hopping tour through folk, blues, and country," Hold Time received an aggregated 79 out of 100 on Metacritic, for "generally favorable reviews" and reached No. 31 on Billboard's Top 200.

=== A Wasteland Companion and More Rain (2012–16) ===
After several years of touring and releasing albums with pop project She & Him and folk supergroup Monsters of Folk, Ward released his seventh studio album, A Wasteland Companion, in 2012 on Merge and Bella Union. Reaching number 21 in the US charts, A Wasteland Companion received an aggregated score of 75 out of 100 on Metacritic, indicating "generally favorable reviews". Will Hermes of Rolling Stone gave the album 3.5 of 5 stars, reflective of the aggregated score, and commented that "[A Wasteland Companion] is his most vivid and varied yet, full of exquisite guitar work,...gem-like songcraft...and inspired covers." Matthew McFarland of Prefix offered the criticism, "What's missing, though, is the familiar sense of deft control over the album's arc, the lyrical intrigues, and the instrumental detail that make his other work so indispensable [sic] to the indie folk canon of last decade."

After another multi-year break from solo recording, M. Ward released his eighth album, More Rain, on March 4, 2016, via Merge and Bella Union. Ward began working on More Rain in 2012, initially experimenting with layering his own vocals to create a doo-wop record. After collaborating with other artists on the record such as R.E.M.'s Peter Buck, k.d. lang, Neko Case, and others, the sound of the album went in a different direction, described as a "true gotta-stay-indoors, rainy-season record that looks upwards through the weather while reflecting on his past."

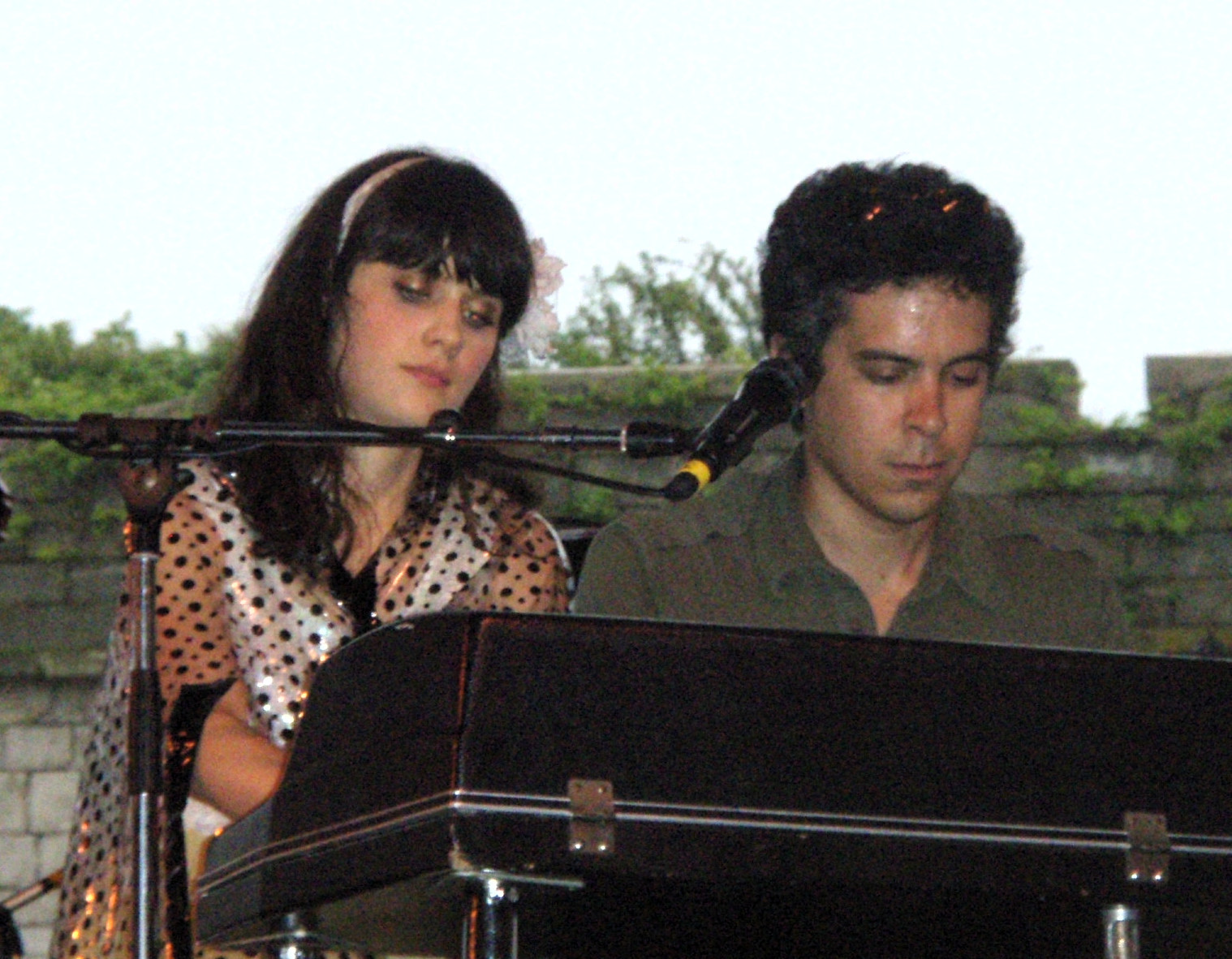
Ward (right) and Zooey Deschanel performing as She & Him at the Newport Folk Festival (August 2, 2008)

=== What a Wonderful Industry, Migration Stories, Think of Spring and Supernatural Thing (2017–present) ===
On June 8, 2018, Ward self-released What a Wonderful Industry, his ninth studio album. Using a variety of anecdotes and metaphors, the album examines the complex challenges of working within the cutthroat music industry. As Ward stated in an interview with NPR, "You quickly learn there's a perfectly imperfect balance of cold-blooded and warm-blooded animals in the zoo....This record visits the most memorable characters. There's a lot of very inspirational people I've had the pleasure to work with but there are also a few I wish I'd never met."

Ward's tenth studio album, Migration Stories, was released on April 3, 2020, on Anti Records.

On December 11, 2020 Ward also released Think of Spring which is a tribute to the live album Lady in Satin by Billie Holiday. The album features solo acoustic versions most of the songs from Lady in Satin (excluding Glad to Be Unhappy and The End of a Love Affair and including All The Way, which was recorded by Holiday and released on her 1959 album Last Recording). Ward recorded the album from home during the COVID-19 pandemic on a Tascam Portastudio four-track cassette recorder.

In June 2023, Anti Records released Ward's twelfth solo album Supernatural Thing.

== With other musicians ==
=== She and Him ===
In 2006, Ward was working on the soundtrack for the film The Go-Getter, co-starring actress Zooey Deschanel, when Director Martin Hynes suggested Ward and Deschanel record a duet for the movie. Ward later referred to the collaboration as "a fruitful, creative experience." Deschanel soon sent Ward demos of songs she had written, and the two formed the pop duo She & Him to record together, with Deschanel writing the songs. The duo's first album Volume One — which Ward produced – was released on Merge Records on March 18, 2008. Volume One found critical and commercial success for Deschanel and Ward's pop music. The album reached No. 31 on Billboard's Top 200, and Metacritic has the critical album reviews aggregated to 76 out of 100, or "generally favorable reviews".

She & Him's second album, Volume Two, was released on Merge in 2010. Volume Two peaked at No. 6 on Billboard's Top 200, outperforming their first release. A Very She & Him Christmas was released October 25, 2011, on Merge Records, peaking at No. 12. After a break, She & Him released their third album of original songs, Volume 3 in 2013 followed by a collection of standards, Classics, in 2014. Both albums also charted and were released on Merge. In 2016 they released their second christmas album, Christmas Party.

=== Monsters of Folk ===
Monsters of Folk is a project formed by Ward, Jim James of My Morning Jacket, and Conor Oberst and Mike Mogis of Bright Eyes. The four had been touring and playing together at various points throughout the 2000s and regularly talked of making an album together. The result, the eponymous Monsters of Folk, was released in September 2009. Monsters of Folk received "generally favorable reviews" with an aggregate score of 80 out of 100 on Metacritic. Prefix's Dave Clark said of the supergroup that "The players on Monsters of Folk complement each other extremely well. There is definitely something to be said for group chemistry. These songs don't always shine the way they could, but the album is a great effort." Monsters of Folk was a commercial success, peaking at No. 15 on Billboard's Top 200.

=== Geckøs ===
An impromptu performance at the wedding of a mutual friend lead to a long-distance collaboration under the name Geckøs with Howe Gelb of Giant Sand and McKowski of The Lost Brothers. The group released its first eponymous album in September 2025.

=== Other artists ===
M. Ward has produced all his solo work and every album by She & Him. In addition he has produced albums for Jenny Lewis, Mavis Staples and most recently Valerie June.

He has performed on recordings by Brian Wilson, Kim Deal, Giant Sand, Cat Power, Neko Case, Beth Orton (with whom he co-wrote the title track to her album Comfort of Strangers), The Court & Spark, Bright Eyes (with whom he toured on the 2004 Vote for Change tour with R.E.M. and Bruce Springsteen), Jenny Lewis (whose debut solo album Rabbit Fur Coat he co-produced), and My Morning Jacket.

In 2005, Ward was – along with Aaron Burtch, Jason Lytle and Jim Fairchild from Grandaddy, Scout Niblett, Marie Frank or Jeremy Gara – involved in Howe Gelb's project called Arizona Amp and Alternator, which had officially no band members but a lot of guest musicians (M. Ward's voice can be recognized on the track "Aaaa(3)").

In 2006, he helped produce and contributed a song to the John Fahey tribute album I Am the Resurrection. He also appears on Norah Jones' album Not Too Late, performing backing vocals and guitar on "Sinkin' Soon", and toured as the opener and a member of her "Handsome Band" for the album in the spring of 2007. Also his cover of David Bowie's song "Let's Dance" is featured on the soundtrack of the 2007 New Zealand film Eagle vs Shark. Ward was previously a member of the band Rodriguez with Kyle Field of Little Wings and Mike Funk of Echodrone. Their album Swing Like a Metronome was released in 2000 and produced by Jason Lytle of Grandaddy.

Songs or compositions written by M. Ward have been recorded or performed by: Bright Eyes ("Seashell Tale"), Feist ("Post War"), Cat Power ("Sad Sad Song"), Carrie Rodriguez ("Eyes on the Prize"), Grandaddy ("Fishing Boat Song"), Lloyd Cole ("Chinese Translation"), Gillian Welch and Dave Rawlings ("One Life Away" "Fuel for Fire"), Norah Jones ("Lullaby + Exile"), and She and Him ("Magic Trick").

In 2013, Ward contributed guitar work to the Neko Case album The Worse Things Get, The Harder I Fight, The Harder I Fight, The More I Love You.

== Selected discography ==
=== Solo albums ===
- Duet for Guitars #2 (1999)
- End of Amnesia (2001) (reissued 2013)
- Transfiguration of Vincent (2003)
- Transistor Radio (2005)
- Post-War (2006) (No. 146 U.S.)
- Hold Time (2009) (No. 31 U.S.)
- A Wasteland Companion (2012) (No. 21 U.S., No. 106 U.K.)
- More Rain (2016)
- What a Wonderful Industry (2018)
- Migration Stories (April 2020)
- Think of Spring (December 2020)
- Supernatural Thing (June 2023)
- For Beginners: The Best of M. Ward (September 2024)

=== EPs ===
- Scene from No. 12 (I Ain't Sleeping) (2000)
- To Go Home (2007)

=== She and Him ===
- Volume One (2008) (No. 71 U.S.)
- Volume Two (2010) (No. 6 U.S.)
- A Very She & Him Christmas (October 25, 2011)
- Volume Three (May 7, 2013) (No. 15 U.S.)
- Classics (December 2, 2014)
- Christmas Party (October 28, 2016)
- Melt Away: A Tribute to Brian Wilson (July 22, 2022)
