= Transistor Radio (album) =

Studio album by M. Ward
- Released: February 22, 2005
- Genre: Folk
- Length: 43:18
- Labels: Merge Records (US); Matador Records (Europe)
- Producer: M. Ward

M. Ward chronology
Transfiguration of Vincent (2003)	Transistor Radio (2005)	Post-War (2006)

Professional ratings
Aggregate scores
Source	Rating
Metacritic	78/100
Review scores
Source	Rating
AllMusic	4/5 stars
Drowned in Sound	4.5/5 stars
The Guardian	4/5 stars
Pitchfork	8.2/10
Rolling Stone	3/5 stars
Sputnikmusic	4.5/5 stars

Transistor Radio is the fourth studio album by M. Ward. It was released on February 22, 2005.

The first track is an instrumental cover of a track from The Beach Boys album Pet Sounds.

== Track listing ==
All songs by Matt Ward except where noted.

1. "You Still Believe in Me" (Brian Wilson, Tony Asher) – 2:24
2. "One Life Away" – 1:57
3. "Sweethearts on Parade" (Carmen Lombardo, Charles Newman) – 2:12
4. "Hi-Fi" – 4:14
5. "Fuel for Fire" – 4:12
6. "Four Hours in Washington" – 3:01
7. "Regeneration No.1" – 1:18
8. "Big Boat" – 2:45
9. "Paul's Song" – 3:10
10. "Radio Campaign" – 2:36
11. "Here Comes the Sun Again" – 2:21
12. "Deep Dark Well" – 2:25
13. "Oh Take Me Back" – 2:07
14. "I'll Be Yr Bird" – 2:54
15. "Lullaby + Exile" – 2:44
16. "Well-Tempered Clavier" (Johann Sebastian Bach) – 2:58

== Charts ==
Chart (2006)	Peak position
UK Independent Albums (Official Charts)	33
US Billboard 200	27
US Heatseekers Albums (Billboard)	27
US Independent Albums (Billboard)	36
