= End of Amnesia =

Studio album by M. Ward
- Released: July 17, 2001
- Genre: Folk
- Length: 53:22
- Label: M. Ward Records, Future Farmer Records, Loose Music
- Producer: M. Ward

M. Ward chronology
Duet for Guitars#2 (1999)	End of Amnesia (2001)	Live Music & The Voice of Strangers (2003)

Professional ratings
Review scores
Source	Rating
AllMusic	4.5/5 stars
Pitchfork Media	(7.6/10)

End of Amnesia is the second studio album by M. Ward. Originally released by Future Farmer Records, it has been reissued on M. Ward Records.

== Track listing ==
No.	Title	Length
1.	"End of Amnesia"	2:11
2.	"Color of Water"	3:23
3.	"Half Moon"	2:49
4.	"So Much Water"	4:02
5.	"Bad Dreams"	4:16
6.	"Archangel Tale"	3:48
7.	"Silverline"	2:20
8.	"Flaming Heart"	3:54
9.	"Carolina"	4:19
10.	"From a Pirate Radio Sermon, 1989"	3:20
11.	"Psalm"	3:50
12.	"Ella"	3:41
13.	"Seashell Tale"	3:49
14.	"O'Brien/O'Brien's Nocturne"	7:40
Total length:		53:22
