= To Go Home =

EP by M. Ward
- Released: February 20, 2007
- Genre: Folk
- Length: 14:38
- Label: Merge (US); 4AD (Europe)
- Producer: M. Ward

M. Ward chronology
| Post-War (2006) | To Go Home (2007) | Hold Time (2009) |

Professional ratings
Review scores
| Source | Rating |
|---|---|
| Pitchfork | 5.7/10 link |

To Go Home is an EP released by M. Ward in 2007 for Merge Records. The title track, originally by Daniel Johnston, is also found on M. Ward's 2006 album Post-War.

== Track listing ==
All songs by Matt Ward except where noted.

1. "To Go Home" (Daniel Johnston) – 4:04
2. "Cosmopolitan Pap" – 1:58
3. "Human Punching Bag" – 3:04
4. "Headed for a Fall" (Jimmie Dale Gilmore) – 5:32
