= Post-War =

Studio album by M. Ward
- Released: August 22, 2006
- Studio: Blue Rooms, Portland; Type Foundry, Portland; Wavelab, Tucson, Arizona; Presto!, Lincoln, Nebraska
- Genre: Folk rock
- Length: 37:35
- Label: Merge (US); 4AD (Europe)

M. Ward chronology
Transistor Radio (2005)	Post-War (2006)	To Go Home (2007)

Professional ratings
Aggregate scores
Source	Rating
Metacritic	81/100
Review scores
Source	Rating
AllMusic	4.5/5 stars
The A.V. Club	A−
Entertainment Weekly	A
The Guardian	4/5 stars
The Independent	4/5 stars
Mojo	4/5 stars
Pitchfork	8.2/10
Rolling Stone	3.5/5 stars
Spin	3.5/5 stars
Uncut	4/5 stars

Post-War is the fifth studio album by M. Ward. It was released on August 22, 2006, by Merge Records. It features the single "To Go Home", a cover of a song written by Daniel Johnston. Guest appearances were made by Jim James of My Morning Jacket (who sang on "Magic Trick"), Rachel Blumberg, drummer for the indie rock band The Decemberists, Neko Case, and Mike Mogis. Ward has said that the song "Today's Undertaking" was heavily inspired by Roy Orbison's 1963 single "In Dreams".

== Track listing ==
All songs by Matt Ward except where noted.

1. "Poison Cup" – 2:40
2. "To Go Home" – 3:51 (Daniel Johnston)
3. "Right in the Head" – 4:12
4. "Post-War" – 4:55
5. "Requiem" – 2:48
6. "Chinese Translation" – 3:58
7. "Eyes on the Prize" – 2:37
8. "Magic Trick" – 1:43
9. "Neptune's Net" – 2:06
10. "Rollercoaster" – 2:48
11. "Today's Undertaking" – 2:26
12. "Afterword/Rag" – 3:32
13. "Chinese Translation" (enhanced video)

== Personnel ==
- M. Ward – guitars, voice, keys, chimes on 4
- Mike Coykendall – bass, percussion on 4, 10, voice on 6, 7, 10, drums on 1, 8, harp on 8
- Jordan Hudson– drums on 2, 3, 4, 5, 6, 9, percussion on 7
- Rachel Blumberg – drums on 2, 5, 6, 8, 9, 11, 12, voice on 12
- Mike Mogis – timpani on 1, 11, mandolin on 3, chimes on 9, 11, cymbal on 9, 11, 12, triangle on 9, Omnichord on 11, Chamberlin on 12
- Amanda Lawrence – violin, viola on 1, 11
- Jim James – voice on 6, 8, guitar on 8
- Skip Von Kuske – cello, bass on 1
- Neko Case – voice on 2

== Charts ==
Chart (2006)	Peak position
Swedish Albums (Sverigetopplistan)	28
US Billboard 200	146
US Independent Albums (Billboard)	7
US Heatseekers Albums (Billboard)	3
