= Last Recording =

Studio album by Billie Holiday
- Released: July 1959
- Recorded: March 3, 4, & 11, 1959
- Genre: Vocal jazz
- Length: 34:58
- Label: MGM
- Producer: Ray Ellis

Billie Holiday chronology
Lady in Satin (1958)	Last Recording (1959)	The Essential Billie Holiday: Carnegie Hall Concert Recorded Live (1961)

Alternative cover
- Original cover before album retitled Last Recording after Holiday's death in July 1959

Billie Holiday is the twelfth and final studio album by jazz singer Billie Holiday, released on MGM Records in 1959. It was retitled after her death as Last Recording.

== Content ==
After the success of her album, Lady in Satin (1958), Billie Holiday wanted to record another album with arranger Ray Ellis. Ellis had switched from Columbia to MGM, so Billie switched labels also to avoid breaching her contract with Columbia. When she returned to the studio in March 1959, jazz critic and friend of Holiday's Leonard Feather, said Holiday "walked into the studio statuesque and sharp as ever."

When Holiday recorded her previous album Lady in Satin with Ellis, she conveyed to him her desire to “sound like Sinatra”, but at the time was in such poor health from years of difficulty and substance abuse that a nurse sometimes had to help keep her propped up on a high stool as she sang. Billie Holiday was a departure from the stylings of her more string laden previous album, making use of a lighter string orchestra, minus the choir, and more horns, including a saxophone and a more jazz like feeling. It also demanded less fanfare. Songs like "All of You", "'Deed I Do", and "Baby Won't You Please Come Home" have a lighter and happier tempo and do not include strings.

During the time of recording Billie Holiday, Holiday's health was taking its toll. Some say that she did not look like herself at all, and looked like a ghost of what she once was.

In the song "There'll Be Some Changes Made", Holiday replaces the name Jack Benny in the lyric "Even Jack Benny has been changin' his jokes" to Frank Sinatra, her jazz friend.

The album was completed on March 11, 1959. Four days later, Billie Holiday's lifelong friend and music partner Lester Young died on March 15, 1959. She would die four months later on July 17, 1959, at the age of 44.

AllMusic music critic Ron Wynn stated, "In many ways, a sad event... It's poignant in a tragic way." The Penguin Guide to Jazz Recordings awarded the album three stars, but placed the entire rating in brackets, indicating that the authors had reservations about the album as a whole.

Professional ratings
Review scores
Source	Rating
AllMusic	1.5/5 stars
The Penguin Guide to Jazz Recordings	3/4 stars

== Voice ==
By 1959, use of hard drugs and alcohol had taken their toll on Holiday's voice. It is evident that her voice had deteriorated since her previous album Lady in Satin. Producer and arranger Ray Ellis said that the producers "accidentally" adjusted the speed at 1/4 pitch faster in the studio making Holiday's voice high pitched in some songs like "You Took Advantage of Me".

== Track listing ==
1. "All of You" from Silk Stockings - (Cole Porter) -2:30
2. "Sometimes I'm Happy" from Hit the Deck - (Irving Caesar, Clifford Gray, Vincent Youmans) -2:46
3. "You Took Advantage of Me" from Present Arms - (Richard Rodgers, Lorenz Hart) - 2:46
4. "When It's Sleepy Time Down South" from Safe in Hell - (Leon René, Otis René, Clarence Muse) - 4:04
5. "There'll Be Some Changes Made" - (W. Benton Overstreet, Billy Higgins) - 2:52
6. "'Deed I Do" - (Walter Hirsch, Fred Rose) - 2:14
7. "Don't Worry 'bout Me" - (Ted Koehler, Rube Bloom) - 3:08
8. "All the Way" from The Joker Is Wild - (Sammy Cahn, Jimmy Van Heusen) - 3:22
9. "Just One More Chance" - (Sam Coslow, Arthur Johnston) - 3:43
10. "It's Not for Me to Say" - (Al Stillman, Robert Allen) - 2:25
11. "I'll Never Smile Again" - (Ruth Lowe) - 3:23
12. "Baby Won't You Please Come Home" - (Charles Warfield, Clarence Williams) - 3:03

== Personnel ==
- Billie Holiday - vocals
- Ray Ellis - arranger & conductor
- Harry Edison - trumpet
- Joe Wilder - trumpet
- Billy Byers - trombone
- Tommy Mitchell - bass trombone
- Gene Quill - alto saxophone
- Al Cohn - tenor saxophone
- Danny Bank - baritone saxophone
- Hank Jones - piano
- Barry Galbraith - guitar
- Milt Hinton - bass
- Osie Johnson - drums
