= Transfiguration of Vincent =

Studio album by M. Ward
- Released: March 18, 2003
- Genre: Folk
- Length: 44:09
- Label: Merge (US); Matador (Europe)

M. Ward chronology
Live Music & The Voice of Strangers (2001)	Transfiguration of Vincent (2003)	Transistor Radio (2005)

Transfiguration of Vincent, released in 2003, is the third studio album by singer-songwriter M. Ward. The title alludes to the 1965 album The Transfiguration of Blind Joe Death by John Fahey, and refers to the life and death of Vincent O'Brien, a close friend to Ward.

== Reception ==
Professional ratings
Aggregate scores
Source	Rating
Metacritic	82/100
Review scores
Source	Rating
AllMusic	4/5 stars
Blender	4/5 stars
The Guardian	4/5 stars
Mojo	4/5 stars
Pitchfork	8.3/10
Q	4/5 stars
Stylus Magazine	A−
Uncut	4/5 stars

Transfiguration of Vincent placed on Slant Magazine's list of best albums of the 2000s at number 88.

== Track listing ==
1. "Transfiguration #1" – 2:41
2. "Vincent O'Brien" – 2:38
3. "Sad, Sad Song" – 3:10
4. "Undertaker" – 3:33
5. "Duet for Guitars #3" – 1:52
6. "Outta My Head" – 2:52
7. "Involuntary" – 4:03
8. "Helicopter" – 3:51
9. "Poor Boy, Minor Key" – 3:28
10. "Fool Says" – 1:49
11. "Get to the Table on Time" – 1:30
12. "A Voice at the End of the Line" – 2:14
13. "Dead Man" – 3:23
14. "Let's Dance" (David Bowie) – 5:00
15. "Transfiguration #2" – 2:05
