= Duet for Guitars No. 2 =

Duet for Guitars #2

Studio album by M. Ward
- Released: 1999
- Recorded: 1998 at Type Foundry Studios, Portland
- Genre: Folk
- Length: 37:18
- Labels: Co-Dependent Records (1999), Ow Om Records (2000), Merge Records (2007)
- Producer: M. Ward

M. Ward chronology
Duet for Guitars #2 (1999)	End of Amnesia (2001)

Professional ratings
Review scores
Source	Rating
Allmusic	3.5/5 stars

Duet for Guitars #2 was the first album recorded by M. Ward, originally released in 1999. The album has been re-issued in 2000 and on July 10, 2007. Ward states in the liner notes that "Most of these songs were written in Chicago but the others were figured out en route to or in Seattle, but they were all recorded in Portland by Adam Selzer."

== Track listing (2007 Merge release) ==
1. "Duet for Guitars #2" – 2:05
2. "Beautiful Car" – 2:37
3. "Fishing Boat Song" – 1:42
4. "Scene from #12" – 2:51
5. "Good News" – 3:13
6. "The Crooked Spine" – 1:38
7. "Look Me Over" – 4:08
8. "Who May Be Lazy" – 3:06
9. "It Won't Happen Twice" – 2:46
10. "He Asked Me to Be a Snake & Live Underground" – 1:19
11. "Song from Debby's Stairs" – 3:20
12. "It Was a Beautiful Car" – 1:06
13. "Were You There?" (bonus track) – 2:37
14. "I'll be yr Bird" (bonus track) – 2:50
15. "Not a Gang" (bonus track) – 2:33
16. "Duet for Guitars #1" (bonus track) – 2:17
