= Ray Ellis =

American record producer, arranger and conductor (1923–2008)

Ray Ellis discography
- Studio albums: Billie Holiday's Lady in Satin (1958)

Ray Ellis (July 28, 1923 – October 27, 2008) was an American record producer, arranger, conductor, and saxophonist. He was responsible for the orchestration in Billie Holiday's Lady in Satin (1958).

== Biography ==
Raymond Spencer Ellis was born in Philadelphia. He composed, and performed much of the underscore music for the animated Spider-Man (1967 TV series). He composed two extended themes for The Today Show, the first in 1971. It was used as the Friday closing theme (and eventually the show's full-time theme) until the end of the decade. However, in Herald Square Music v. Living Music, the District Court of the Southern District of New York "found the instrumental arrangement and harmonization of defendant's melody to be substantially similar to that of 'Day by Day,'" a Stephen Schwartz song from the musical Godspell. As a result, Ellis composed a second Today Show theme based on the trademark NBC chimes. That theme was the NBC show's signature from 1978 to 1985 and has appeared irregularly on the morning program ever since.

=== Work with Filmation ===
Using the name of his wife "Yvette Blais" as a pseudonym, Ellis and Norm Prescott, who used the pseudonym "Jeff Michael" after his sons Jeff and Michael) composed nearly all of the background music for cartoon studio Filmation from 1968 to 1982, according to DVD booklets for Ark II, Space Academy, and Jason of Star Command. This also included much of the music used in Star Trek: The Animated Series, which was re-released on November 29, 2016 as part of that franchise's 50th anniversary.

=== Death ===
Ellis died of complications from melanoma on October 27, 2008, at an assisted-living facility in Encino, California. He was survived by sons Marc and Jeffrey.

== Selected discography ==
=== As arranger or conductor ===
- Mood Jazz, Joe Castro (Atlantic, 1956)
- Lady in Satin, Billie Holiday (Columbia, 1958)
- Last Recording, Billie Holiday (MGM, 1959)
- Chris Connor Sings the George Gershwin Almanac of Song, Chris Connor (Atlantic, 1961)
- Let's Sit This One Out, Paul Anka (RCA, 1962)
- Here's Lena, Lena Horne (20th Century Fox, 1966)
- The Third Album, Barbra Streisand (Columbia, 1963)
- And I Love Him!, Esther Phillips (Atlantic, 1965)
- Seven Letters, Ben E. King (1965)
- Herbie Mann Plays The Roar of the Greasepaint – The Smell of the Crowd, Herbie Mann (1965)
- Soul, Lena Horne (United Artists, 1966)
- A Taste of the Fantastic Michele Lee, Michele Lee (Columbia, 1966)
- There Is a Time, Liza Minnelli (Columbia, 1966)
- Christmas Eve with Johnny Mathis, Johnny Mathis (Columbia, 1986)
- A Lazy Afternoon, Harold Land (Postcards, 1995)
- The Christmas Album, Johnny Mathis (Columbia, 2002)
