= Bill Carey (songwriter) =

American songwriter

William D. Carey (May 20, 1916 – January 27, 2004) was an American songwriter, actor, and author.

== Early life ==
Carey was born on May 20, 1916, in Hollister, California.

== Career ==
Carey acted in Roberta, Old Man Rhythm, Freshman Love, A Yank at Oxford, Something to Sing About, and Campus Confessions.

Carey was a lyricist for Eva Cassidy, Ella Fitzgerald, Billie Holiday, Nat King Cole, George Michael, Joni Mitchell, Frank Sinatra, and Sarah Vaughan. He wrote the words to "Who Wouldn't Love You?".

== Personal life and death ==
Carey had two sons with his first wife, Leona Olsen. His second wife was Ruth Hill Gibian. They resided in Laguna Beach, California.

Carey died on January 27, 2004, at age 87.
