= Mike Coykendall =

American musician, audio engineer, and record producer

- Born: 1963 (age 62–63); Norwich, Kansas, U.S.
- Genres: Indie rock, indie folk
- Occupation: Musician
- Years active: 1984–present
- Labels: Fluff & Gravy, Field Hymns, Stereotype
- Website: www.mikecoykendall.com

Mike Coykendall is a musician, audio engineer, and record producer.

Born in Norwich, Kansas in 1963, Coykendall was a member of the Wichita-based Klyde Konnor, which performed and recorded frequently throughout the 1980s and early 1990s. He moved to San Francisco in 1991 and released three critically acclaimed albums with the Old Joe Clarks. After moving to Portland, Oregon in 1999, he set up a home studio, where he recorded albums for a myriad of bands, including She & Him, M. Ward, Beth Orton, Richmond Fontaine, Tin Hat Trio, Blitzen Trapper, and Bright Eyes.

As a solo artist, he has released the albums Hello Hello Hello (Stereotype, 2005), The Unbearable Being of Likeness (Field Hymns, 2010), Chasing Away the Dots (Fluff and Gravy, 2012), and Half Past, Present Pending (Fluff and Gravy, 2015).

== Discography ==
- Half Past, Present Pending (Fluff & Gravy, 2015)
- Chasing Away the Dots (Fluff & Gravy, 2012)
- The Unbearable Being of Likeness (Field Hymns, 2010)
- Hello Hello Hello (Stereotype, 2005)

As guest

- Four Winds, Bright Eyes (Saddle Creek, 2007)
- Volume One, She & Him (Merge, 2008)
- Volume Two, She & Him (Merge, 2010)
