= Bright Eyes discography =

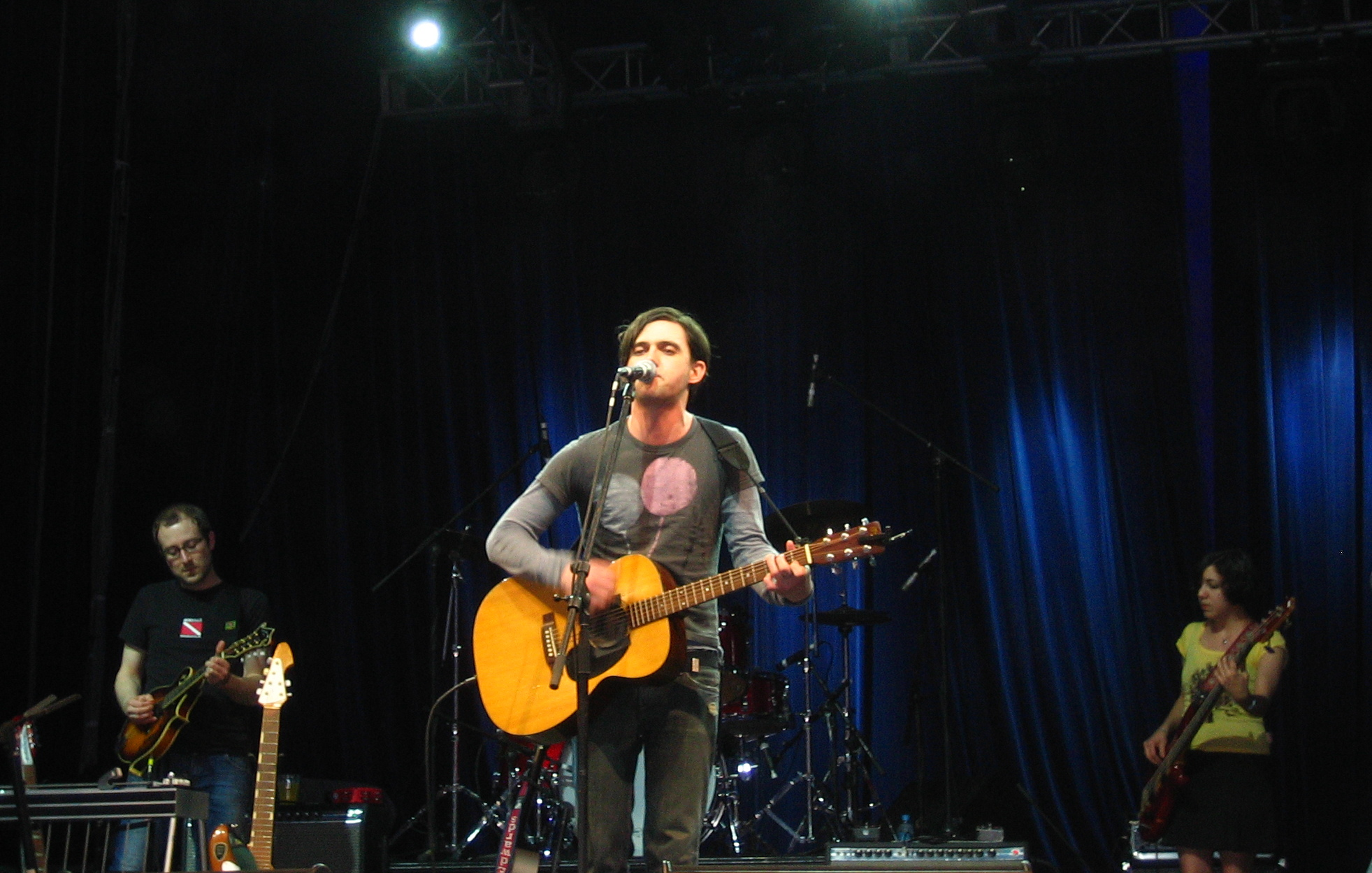
- Conor Oberst of Bright Eyes performing in 2005
- Studio albums: 11
- Extended plays: 15
- Live albums: 1
- Compilation albums: 1
- Singles: 36
- Video albums: 2
- Music videos: 15
- Splits and collaborations: 12
- Box set: 2

The discography of American indie rock band Bright Eyes consists of twelve studio albums, one compilation album, one live album, two box sets, fifteen extended plays, 36 singles, two video albums and fifteen music videos.

== Albums ==
=== Studio albums ===
| Year | Details | Chart positions | | | | | | | | | | Sales | Certifications |
| Year | Details | US | AUS | AUT | BEL (FL) | GER | IRE | NLD | SWE | SWI | UK | Sales | Certifications |
|---|---|---|---|---|---|---|---|---|---|---|---|---|---|
| 1998 | A Collection of Songs Written and Recorded 1995–1997: Released: January 20, 1998; Label: Saddle Creek (LBJ-19); Formats: CD, LP | — (Note: A Collection of Songs Written and Recorded 1995–1997 did not enter the US Billboard 200, but peaked at number 15 on the Vinyl Albums Chart.) | — | — | — | — | — | — | — | — | — | US: 53,000 | |
| 1998 | Letting Off the Happiness: Released: November 2, 1998; Label: Saddle Creek (LBJ-23); Formats: CD, LP, digital download | — (Note: Letting Off the Happiness did not enter the US Billboard 200, but peaked at number 4 on the Vinyl Albums Chart.) | — | — | — | — | — | — | — | — | — | US: 56,000 | |
| 2000 | Fevers and Mirrors: Released: May 29, 2000; Label: Saddle Creek (LBJ-32); Formats: CD, LP, digital download | — (Note: Fevers and Mirrors did not enter the US Billboard 200, but peaked at number 7 on the Vinyl Albums Chart.) | — | — | — | — | — | — | — | — | — | US: 147,000 | |
| 2002 | Lifted or The Story Is in the Soil, Keep Your Ear to the Ground: Released: August 13, 2002; Label: Saddle Creek (LBJ-46); Formats: CD, LP, digital download | 161 | — | — | — | — | — | — | 31 | — | 138 | US: 340,000 | |
| 2002 | A Christmas Album: Released: December 1, 2002; Label: Saddle Creek (LBJ-48); Formats: CD, LP, digital download | — | — | — | — | — | — | — | — | — | — | | |
| 2005 | I'm Wide Awake, It's Morning: Released: January 25, 2005; Label: Saddle Creek (LBJ-72); Formats: CD, LP, digital download | 10 | 81 | 46 | 41 | 21 | 24 | 53 | 12 | — | 23 | US: 522,000 | RIAA: Gold; BPI: Gold |
| 2005 | Digital Ash in a Digital Urn: Released: January 25, 2005; Label: Saddle Creek (LBJ-73); Formats: CD, LP, digital download | 15 | 130 | 49 | 64 | 30 | 50 | 95 | 18 | — | 43 | US: 268,000 | |
| 2007 | Cassadaga: Released: April 10, 2007; Label: Saddle Creek (LBJ-103); Formats: CD, LP, digital download | 4 | 40 | 47 | 25 | 19 | 35 | 36 | 33 | 59 | 13 | US: 231,000 | |
| 2011 | The People's Key: Released: February 15, 2011; Label: Saddle Creek (LBJ-158); Formats: CD, LP, digital download | 13 | 55 | 36 | 60 | 42 | 49 | 67 | 39 | 50 | 46 | US: 63,000 | |
| 2020 | Down in the Weeds, Where the World Once Was: Released: August 21, 2020; Label: Dead Oceans (DOC210); Formats: CD, LP, cassette, digital download | 36 | 67 | 21 | 34 | 8 | 87 | 62 | — | 32 | 22 | | |
| 2024 | Five Dice, All Threes: Released: September 20, 2024; Label: Dead Oceans; Formats: CD, LP, digital download | — | — | — | — | 38 | — | — | — | 85 | — | | |
"—" denotes releases that did not chart or were not released in that territory

=== Live albums ===
| Year | Details |
|---|---|
| 2005 | Motion Sickness: Live Recordings: Released: November 15, 2005; Label: Team Love Records (TL-06); Formats: CD, LP, digital download |

=== Compilation albums ===
| Year | Details | Chart positions | | |
| Year | Details | US | US Indie | UK |
|---|---|---|---|---|
| 2006 | Noise Floor (Rarities: 1998–2005): Released: October 24, 2006; Label: Saddle Creek (LBJ-99); Formats: CD, LP, digital download | 107 | 6 | 155 |

=== Box sets ===
| Year | Details | Chart positions | |
| Year | Details | US Indie | US Folk |
|---|---|---|---|
| 2003 | Vinyl Box Set: Released: September 9, 2003; Label: Saddle Creek (LBJ-53); Formats: 7×LP box set | — | — |
| 2016 | The Studio Albums: 2000–2011: Released: 2016; Label: Saddle Creek (LBJ-240); Formats: LP, CD, Digital | 46 | 23 |

== Extended plays ==
| Year | Details | Chart positions | | | | |
| Year | Details | US | US Indie | US Rock | UK | UK Indie |
|---|---|---|---|---|---|---|
| 1999 | Every Day and Every Night: Released: November 1, 1999; Label: Saddle Creek (LBJ-30); Formats: 12-inch, CD, digital download | — (Note: Every Day and Every Night did not enter the US Billboard 200, but peaked at number 8 on the Vinyl Albums Chart.) | — | — | — (Note: "Every Day and Every Night" did not enter the UK Albums Chart, but peaked at number 12 on the UK Physical Singles Chart Top 100.) | — |
| 2000 | Don't Be Frightened of Turning the Page: Released: September 21, 2000; Labels: Bad News (BNCP-43) 62TV (62 TV 29448)/Les Disques Mange-Tout (LDMTCD009); Format: CD issued only in Japan and Europe | — | — | — | — | — |
| 2001 | 3 Hit New Songs: Released: May 7, 2001; Labels: Wichita Recordings (WEBB012S); Format: 7-inch, CD | — | — | — | — | — |
| 2002 | There Is No Beginning to the Story: Released: May 6, 2002; Label: Saddle Creek (LBJ-45); Formats: 12-inch, CD, digital download | — (Note: There Is No Beginning to the Story did not enter the US Billboard 200, but peaked at number 14 on the Vinyl Albums Chart.) | — | — | — | — |
| 2007 | Four Winds: Released: March 6, 2007; Label: Saddle Creek (JBL-101); Formats: 12-inch, CD, digital download | 57 | 5 | 20 | — | — |
| 2011 | Live Recordings: Released: July 4, 2011; Label: Polydor (2777039); Format: CD issued only in Europe | — | — | — | — | — |
| 2022 | A Collection of Songs Written and Recorded 1995-1997: A Companion: Released: May 27, 2022; Label: Dead Oceans; Format: vinyl, digital download | — (Note: A Collection of Songs Written and Recorded 1995-1997: A Companion did not enter the US Billboard 200, but peaked at number 96 on the Top Album Sales Chart.) | — | — | — | — |
| 2022 | Letting Off the Happiness: A Companion: Released: May 27, 2022; Label: Dead Oceans; Format: vinyl, digital download | — (Note: Letting Off the Happiness: A Companion did not enter the US Billboard 200, but peaked at number 92 on the Top Album Sales Chart.) | — | — | — | — |
| 2022 | Fevers and Mirrors: A Companion: Released: May 27, 2022; Label: Dead Oceans; Format: Vinyl, digital download | — (Note: Fevers and Mirrors: A Companion did not enter the US Billboard 200, but peaked at number 54 on the Top Album Sales Chart.) | — | — | — | 43 |
| 2022 | Lifted or the Story is in the Soil, Keep Your Ear to the Ground: A Companion: Released: November 11, 2022; Label: Dead Oceans; Format: Vinyl, digital download | — | — | — | — | — |
| 2022 | I'm Wide Awake, It's Morning: A Companion: Released: November 11, 2022; Label: Dead Oceans; Format: Vinyl, digital download | — | — | — | — | — |
| 2022 | Digital Ash in a Digital Urn: A Companion: Released: November 11, 2022; Label: Dead Oceans; Format: Vinyl, digital download | — | — | — | — | — |
| 2023 | Noise Floor: A Companion: Released: June 16, 2023; Label: Dead Oceans; Format: Vinyl, digital download | — | — | — | — | — |
| 2023 | Cassadaga: A Companion: Released: June 16, 2023; Label: Dead Oceans; Format: Vinyl, digital download | — | — | — | — | — |
| 2023 | The People's Key: A Companion: Released: June 16, 2023; Label: Dead Oceans; Format: Vinyl, digital download | — | — | — | — | — |
| 2025 | Kids Table: Released: September 26, 2025; Label: Dead Oceans; Format: Vinyl, digital download | | | | | |

== Splits and collaborations ==
| Year | Release | Other artist(s) | Label | Format(s) |
|---|---|---|---|---|
| 1997 | Bright Eyes / Squad Car 96 | Squad Car 96 | H. (RAV011/AMV007) | 7-inch |
| 1999 | Too Much of a Good Thing is a Good Thing | Books | Vanishing Act (VA-002) | 7-inch |
| 2000 | Bright Eyes vs Her Space Holiday | Her Space Holiday | Wichita (WEBB005S) | 7-inch, CD |
| 2000 | Insound Tour Support Series No. 12 | Son, Ambulance | Insound (INS12) | CD |
| 2001 | Oh Holy Fools: The Music of Son, Ambulance & Bright Eyes | Son, Ambulance | Saddle Creek (LBJ-34) | 12-inch, CD |
| 2001 | Mote/Dust | The Faint | Gold Standard Labs (GSL-47) | 12-inch |
| 2002 | Collaboration Series No. 1 | The Album Leaf | Better Looking (BLR005) | 7-inch |
| 2002 | Home Volume IV: Bright Eyes & Britt Daniel | Britt Daniel (of Spoon) | Post-Parlo Records (PPR1004) | CD |
| 2002 | Bright Eyes with Rilo Kiley & Sorry About Dresden | Rilo Kiley, Sorry About Dresden | Devil in the Woods (DIW #55) | 7-inch |
| 2004 | One Jug of Wine, Two Vessels | Neva Dinova | Crank! (CRC40) | 10-inch, CD |
| 2006 | Super Furry Animals / Bright Eyes | Super Furry Animals, Danger Mouse | Saddle Creek (DM-01) | 7-inch promo |
| 2010 | One Jug of Wine, Two Vessels (reissue) | Neva Dinova | Saddle Creek (LBJ-145) | 12-inch, CD |

== Singles ==
| Title | Year | Peak chart positions | | | | | | | | | | Certifications | Album |
| Title | Year | US Sales | US AAA | US Alt. Dig. | US Rock Dig. | CAN | MEX Air. | SCO | SWE | UK | UK Indie | Certifications | Album |
|---|---|---|---|---|---|---|---|---|---|---|---|---|---|
| "Motion Sickness" | 2000 | — | — | — | — | — | — | — | — | — | — | | Non-album singles |
| "I Will Be Grateful for This Day, I Will Be Grateful for Each Day to Come" | 2001 | — | — | — | — | — | — | — | — | — | — | | Non-album singles |
| "Drunk Kid Catholic" | 2001 | — | — | — | — | — | — | — | — | 109 | 37 | | Non-album singles |
| "Lover I Don't Have to Love" | 2002 | — | — | — | — | — | — | — | — | 95 | 16 | | Lifted or The Story Is in the Soil, Keep Your Ear to the Ground |
| "Lua" | 2004 | 1 | — | — | — | 25 | — | — | — | 80 | 16 | | I'm Wide Awake, It's Morning |
| "Take It Easy (Love Nothing)" | 2004 | 2 | — | — | — | 25 | — | 99 | 59 | 78 | 14 | | Digital Ash in a Digital Urn |
| "When the President Talks to God" | 2005 | — | — | — | — | — | — | — | — | — | — | | Non-album single |
| "First Day of My Life" | 2005 | — | — | — | — | — | — | 35 | — | 37 | 4 | RIAA: Gold; BPI: Silver | I'm Wide Awake, It's Morning |
| "Easy/Lucky/Free" | 2005 | — | — | — | — | — | — | 37 | — | 42 | 6 | | Digital Ash in a Digital Urn |
| "Susan Miller Rag" | 2007 | — | — | — | — | — | — | — | — | — | — | | Non-album single |
| "Four Winds" | 2007 | — | 22 | — | — | — | — | 19 | — | 57 | — | | Cassadaga |
| "Hot Knives" | 2007 | — | — | — | — | — | — | 56 | — | — (Note: "Hot Knives" did not enter the UK Singles Chart, but peaked at number 64 on the UK Physical Singles Chart Top 100.) | — | | Cassadaga |
| "Shell Games" | 2010 | — | — | — | — | — | 28 | — | — | — | — | | The People's Key |
| "Coyote Song" | 2010 | — | — | — | — | — | — | — | — | — | — | | Non-album singles |
| "Singularity" | 2011 | 2 | — | — | — | — | — | — | — | — | — | | Non-album singles |
| "We Are Going to Be Friends" (featuring First Aid Kit; The White Stripes cover) | 2011 | — | — | — | — | — | — | — | — | — | — | | Non-album singles |
| "Jejune Stars" | 2011 | — | — | — | — | — | — | — | — | — | — | | The People's Key |
| "Persona Non Grata" | 2020 | — | — | — | — | — | — | — | — | — (Note: "Persona Non Grata" did not enter the UK Singles Chart, but peaked at number 11 on the UK Physical Singles Chart Top 100.) | — | | Down in the Weeds, Where the World Once Was |
| "Forced Convalescence" | 2020 | — | — | — | — | — | — | — | — | — | — | | Down in the Weeds, Where the World Once Was |
| "One and Done" | 2020 | — | — | — | — | — | — | — | — | — | — | | Down in the Weeds, Where the World Once Was |
| "Mariana Trench" | 2020 | — | 24 | — | — | — | — | — | — | — | — | | Down in the Weeds, Where the World Once Was |
| "Miracle of Life" (featuring Phoebe Bridgers) | 2020 | — | — | 8 | 6 | — | — | — | — | — | — | | Non-album singles |
| "Flirted with You All My Life" (Vic Chesnutt cover) | 2021 | — | — | — | — | — | — | — | — | — | — | | Non-album singles |
| "Running Back" (live for SiriusXM; Thin Lizzy cover) | 2022 | — | — | — | — | — | — | — | — | — | — | | Non-album singles |
| "Falling Out of Love at This Volume" (Companion version; featuring Miwi La Lupa) | 2022 | — | — | — | — | — | — | — | — | — | — | | A Collection of Songs Written and Recorded 1995–1997: A Companion |
| "Contrast and Compare" (Companion version; featuring Waxahatchee) | 2022 | — | — | — | — | — | — | — | — | — | — | | Letting Off the Happiness: A Companion |
| "Haligh, Haligh, a Lie, Haligh" (Companion version; featuring Phoebe Bridgers) | 2022 | — | — | — | — | — | — | — | — | — | — | | Fevers and Mirrors: A Companion |
| "St. Ides Heaven" (Companion version; featuring Phoebe Bridgers; Elliott Smith cover) | 2022 | — | — | — | — | — | — | — | — | — | — | | Letting Off the Happiness: A Companion |
| "You Will. You? Will. You? Will. You? Will." (Companion version; featuring Becky Stark) | 2022 | — | — | — | — | — | — | — | — | — | — | | Lifted or The Story Is in the Soil, Keep Your Ear to the Ground: A Companion |
| "Old Soul Song (for the New World Order)" (Companion version; featuring Becky Stark) | 2022 | — | — | — | — | — | — | — | — | — | — | | I'm Wide Awake, It's Morning: A Companion |
| "Gold Mind Gutted" (Companion version; featuring Michaela Favara) | 2022 | — | — | — | — | — | — | — | — | — | — | | Digital Ash in a Digital Urn: A Companion |
| "Blue Angels Air Show" (Companion version) | 2023 | — | — | — | — | — | — | — | — | — | — | | Noise Floor: A Companion |
| "Middleman" (Companion version) | 2023 | — | — | — | — | — | — | — | — | — | — | | Cassadaga: A Companion |
| "When You Were Mine" (Companion version) | 2023 | — | — | — | — | — | — | — | — | — | — | | The People's Key: A Companion |
| "Bells and Whistles" | 2024 | — | — | — | — | — | — | — | — | — | — | | Five Dice, All Threes |
| "Rainbow Overpass" | 2024 | — | — | — | — | — | — | — | — | — | — | | Five Dice, All Threes |
"—" denotes releases that did not chart or were not released in that territory.

== Videography ==
=== Video albums ===
| Year | Video details |
|---|---|
| 2005 | Live at Paradiso Amsterdam: Distributor: Fabchannel.com; Format: Broadcast/streaming/download |
| 2026 | An Evening with Bright Eyes and Cursive: Distributor:Veeps.com; Format: Broadcast/streaming/download |

=== Music videos ===
| Year | Song | Director |
|---|---|---|
| 2002 | "Bowl of Oranges" | Cat Solen |
| 2002 | "Lover I Don't Have to Love" | James Frost |
| 2005 | "Lua" | Jason Kulbel |
| 2005 | "First Day of My Life" | John Cameron Mitchell |
| 2005 | "Easy/Lucky/Free" | Lily Thorne and Lauri Faggioni |
| 2005 | "At the Bottom of Everything" | Cat Solen |
| 2007 | "Four Winds" | Patrick Daughters |
| 2007 | "Hot Knives" | Patrick Daughters |
| 2007 | "I Must Belong Somewhere" | Asako Masunouchi |
| 2011 | "Shell Games" | Nik Fackler |
| 2011 | "Jejune Stars" | Lance Acord |
| 2020 | "Mariana Trench" | Art Camp |
| 2024 | "Bells and Whistles" | Josh Boone |
| 2024 | "Rainbow Overpass" | Nick Scott |
| 2024 | "All Threes" (featuring Cat Power) | Nick Scott and Rena Johnson |

== Compilation appearances ==
| Year | Song(s) | Album | Label |
|---|---|---|---|
| 1998 | "Falling Out of Love at This Volume" "A Celebration Upon Completion" | Saddle Creek Records, A Sampler | Saddle Creek |
| 1999 | "Pioneer's Park (August 17th, 1997)" | Commercial Food (Processor) | Unread |
| 2000 | "Arienette" | Clooney Tunes | Fierce Panda |
| 2000 | "The City Has Sex" | U.S. Pop Life Vol. 2 / Fanfare of 2000!! | Contact |
| 2000 | "The Calendar Hung Itself" | Holiday Matinee CD Compilation Vol. 2 | Better Looking |
| 2000 | "Have You Ever Heard of Jandek Before?" | Naked in the Afternoon: A Tribute to Jandek | Summersteps |
| 2000 | "Act of Contrition" | Second Thoughts | Silent Film Soundtracks |
| 2000 | "If Winter Ends" | Songs for a Crimson Eggtree | Earworm |
| 2000 | "It's Cool, We Can Still Be Friends" | Transmission One: Tea at the Palaz of Hoon | Hozomeen Press |
| 2002 | "Entry Way Song" | The Amos House Collection Volume II | Wishing Tree |
| 2002 | "Bowl of Oranges" | Gone Fishin'... 3 Years Later | Wichita |
| 2002 | "Metal Firecracker" (Lucinda Williams) | As Yet No Title | Unread |
| 2002 | "Lover I Don't Have to Love" | Rough Trade Shops Counter Culture 2002 | Rough Trade |
| 2003 | "Something Vague" "One Foot in Front of the Other" | Saddle Creek 50 | Saddle Creek |
| 2003 | "Trees Get Wheeled Away" | Lost & Found Volume 1 | Lost Highway |
| 2004 | "Arienette" | Decade: Ten Years of Fierce Panda | Fierce Panda |
| 2004 | "Devil Town" (Daniel Johnston) | The Late Great Daniel Johnston: Discovered Covered | Gammon |
| 2005 | "Napoleon's Hat" | Lagniappe: A Saddle Creek Benefit for Hurricane Katrina Relief | Saddle Creek |
| 2009 | "Papa Was a Rodeo" (The Magnetic Fields) | Score! 20 Years of Merge Records: The Covers! | Merge |
| 2011 | "We're Going to Be Friends" (The White Stripes) | Lunch Box Fund | |

== See also ==
- List of songs by Bright Eyes
- List of songs with Conor Oberst
