= List of songs recorded by Bright Eyes =

Complete alphabetical listing of every song performed by the band Bright Eyes. The list totals 212 songs.

== A ==
- "Act of Contrition" (Noise Floor (Rarities: 1998–2005), 2006)
- "All of the Truth" (A Collection of Songs Written and Recorded 1995–1997, 1998)
- "Amy in the White Coat" (3 More Hit Songs From Bright Eyes, 2002, There Is No Beginning to the Story, 2002, and Noise Floor (Rarities: 1998–2005), 2006)
- "Another Travelin' Song" (I'm Wide Awake, It's Morning, 2005)
- "Approximate Sunlight" (The People's Key, 2011)
- "Arc of Time (Time Code)" (Digital Ash in a Digital Urn, 2005)
- "Arienette" (Fevers and Mirrors, 2000)
- "At the Bottom of Everything" (I'm Wide Awake, It's Morning, 2005, and Motion Sickness, 2005)
- "An Attempt to Tip the Scales" (Fevers and Mirrors, 2000)
- "Away in a Manger" (A Christmas Album, 2002)
- "Awful Sweetness of Escaping Sweat" (A Collection of Songs Written and Recorded 1995–1997, 1998)

== B ==
- "Bad Blood" (Collaboration Series no. 1 7", 2002, and Noise Floor (Rarities: 1998–2005), 2006)
- "Beginner's Mind" (The People's Key, 2011)
- "The Big Picture" (Lifted or The Story Is in the Soil, Keep Your Ear to the Ground, 2002)
- "Black Comedy" (One Jug of Wine, Two Vessels, 2004)
- "Blue Angels Air Show" (Noise Floor (Rarities: 1998–2005), 2006)
- "Blue Christmas" (A Christmas Album, 2002)
- "Bowl of Oranges" (Lifted or The Story Is in the Soil, Keep Your Ear to the Ground, 2002)
- "Burn Rubber" (Take It Easy (Love Nothing) single, 2004)

== C ==
- "Calais to Dover" (Down in the Weeds, Where the World Once Was, 2020)
- "The Calendar Hung Itself..." (Fevers and Mirrors, 2000)
- "Cartoon Blues" (Four Winds, 2007)
- "A Celebration Upon Completion" (A Collection of Songs Written and Recorded 1995–1997, 1998)
- "The Center of the World" (Fevers and Mirrors, 2000)
- "The City Has Sex" (Letting Off the Happiness, 1998)
- "Clairaudients (Kill or Be Killed)" (Cassadaga, 2007)
- "Classic Cars" (Cassadaga, 2007)
- "Cleanse Song" (Cassadaga, 2007)
- "Coat Check Dream Song" (Cassadaga, 2007)
- "Contrast and Compare" (Letting Off the Happiness, 1998)
- "Comet Song" (Down in the Weeds, Where the World Once Was, 2020)
- "Coyote Song" (free Download, 2010)
- "Cremation" (Take It Easy (Love Nothing) single, 2004)

== D ==
- "Dance and Sing" (Down in the Weeds, Where the World Once Was, 2020)
- "Devil in the Details" (Digital Ash in a Digital Urn, 2005)
- "Devil Town" (The Late Great Daniel Johnston: Discovered Covered, 2004, and Noise Floor (Rarities: 1998–2005), 2006)
- "The Difference in the Shades" (Letting Off the Happiness, 1998)
- "Don't Know When But a Day's Gonna Come" (Lifted or The Story Is in the Soil, Keep Your Ear to the Ground, 2002)
- "Down in a Rabbit Hole" (Digital Ash in a Digital Urn, 2005)
- "Driving Fast Through a Big City at Night" (A Collection of Songs Written and Recorded 1995–1997, 1998)
- "Drunk Kid Catholic" (3 New Hit Songs From Bright Eyes, 2001, and Noise Floor (Rarities: 1998–2005), 2006)

== E ==
- "Easy/Lucky/Free" (Digital Ash in a Digital Urn, 2005, and Easy/Lucky/Free single, 2005)
- "Emily, Sing Something Sweet" (A Collection of Songs Written and Recorded 1995–1997, 1998)
- "Empty Canyon, Empty Canteen" (Letting Off the Happiness, 1998, Japanese bonus track)
- "Endless Entertainment" (available when signing up for mailing list)
- "Entry Way Song" (Amos House Collection, Vol. 2, 2002, and Noise Floor (Rarities: 1998–2005), 2006)
- "Exaltation on a Cool Kitchen Floor" (A Collection of Songs Written and Recorded 1995–1997, 1998)

== F ==
- "Falling Out of Love at this Volume" (A Collection of Songs Written and Recorded 1995–1997, 1998)
- "False Advertising" (Lifted or The Story Is in the Soil, Keep Your Ear to the Ground, 2002)
- "Feb. 15th" (A Collection of Songs Written and Recorded 1995–1997, 1998)
- "The 'Feel Good' Revolution" (A Collection of Songs Written and Recorded 1995–1997, 1998)
- "Feeling It (For Ian)" (Too Much of a Good Thing is a Good Thing 7", 1999)
- "Few Minutes on Friday" (A Collection of Songs Written and Recorded 1995–1997, 1998)
- "Firewall" (The People's Key, 2011)
- "First Day of My Life" (First Day of My Life single, 2005 and I'm Wide Awake, It's Morning, 2005)
- "The First Noël" (A Christmas Album, 2002)
- "Forced Convalescence" (Down in the Weeds, Where the World Once Was, 2020)
- "Four Winds" (Four Winds, 2007 and Cassadaga, 2007)
- "From a Balance Beam" (There Is No Beginning to the Story, 2002, and Lifted or The Story Is in the Soil, Keep Your Ear to the Ground, 2002)

== G ==
- "Go Find Yourself a Dry Place" (Bright Eyes / Squadcar 96)
- "God Rest Ye Merry Gentlemen" (A Christmas Album, 2002)
- "Going for the Gold" (Oh Holy Fools: The Music of Son, Ambulance & Bright Eyes, 2001, and Don't Be Frightened of Turning the Page, 2001)
- "Gold Mine Gutted" (Digital Ash in a Digital Urn, 2005)

== H ==
- "Haile Selassie" (The People's Key, 2011)
- "Haligh, Haligh, a Lie, Haligh" (Fevers and Mirrors, 2000)
- "Happy Accident" (One Jug of Wine, Two Vessels, 2010 re-release)
- "Happy Birthday to Me" (February 15)" (3 New Hit Songs From Bright Eyes, 2001, and Noise Floor (Rarities: 1998–2005), 2006)
- "Have You Ever Heard Of Jandek Before?" (Naked in the Afternoon: A Tribute to Jandek, 2000)
- "Have Yourself a Merry Little Christmas" (A Christmas Album, 2002)
- "Hit the Switch" (Digital Ash in a Digital Urn, 2005)
- "Hot Car in the Sun" (Down in the Weeds, Where the World Once Was, 2020)
- "Hot Knives" (Cassadaga, 2007)
- "How Many Lights Do You See?" (A Collection of Songs Written and Recorded 1995–1997, 1998)
- "Hungry for a Holiday" (Collaboration Series no. 1 7", 2002, and Noise Floor (Rarities: 1998–2005), 2006)

== I ==
- "I'll Be Your Friend" (One Jug of Wine, Two Vessels, 2004)
- "I've Been Eating (For You)" (3 New Hit Songs From Bright Eyes, 2001, and Noise Floor (Rarities: 1998–2005), 2006)
- "I Believe in Symmetry" (Digital Ash in a Digital Urn, 2005)
- "I Know You" (One Jug of Wine, Two Vessels, 2010 re-release)
- "I Must Belong Somewhere" (Cassadaga, 2007)
- "I Watched You Taking Off" (A Collection of Songs Written and Recorded 1995–1997, 1998)
- "I Will Be Grateful for This Day, I Will Be Grateful for Each Day to Come" (I Will Be Grateful for This Day, I Will Be Grateful for Each Day to Come, 2001, and Noise Floor (Rarities: 1998–2005), 2006)
- "I Woke Up with this Song in My Head this Morning" (Lua single, 2004)
- "I Won't Ever Be Happy Again" (Insound Tour Support Series No. 12, 2000, and Don't Be Frightened of Turning the Page, 2001)
- "If the Brakeman Turns My Way" (Cassadaga, 2007)
- "If Winter Ends" (Letting Off the Happiness, 1998)
- "In the Real World" (Singularity, 2011)
- "The Invisible Gardener" (A Collection of Songs Written and Recorded 1995–1997, 1998)
- "It's Cool, We Can Still Be Friends" (Transmission One: Tea at the Palaz of Hoon, 2000, and Noise Floor (Rarities: 1998–2005), 2006)

== J ==
- "Jejune Stars" (The People's Key, 2011)
- "Jetsabel Removes the Undesirables" (Fevers and Mirrors, 2000, Japanese bonus track)
- "The Joy in Discovery" (Insound Tour Support Series No. 12, 2000, and Fevers and Mirrors, 2000, Japanese bonus track)
- "The Joy in Forgetting/The Joy in Acceptance" (Insound Tour Support Series No. 12, 2000)
- "June on the West Coast" (Letting Off the Happiness, 1998)
- "Just Once in the World" (Down in the Weeds, Where the World Once Was, 2020)

== K ==
- "Kathy with a K's Song" (Oh Holy Fools: The Music of Son, Ambulance & Bright Eyes, 2001, and Don't Be Frightened of Turning the Page, 2001)

== L ==
- "Ladder Song" (The People's Key, 2011)
- "Lake Havasu (In Florida)" (Kill The Monster Before It Eats the Baby, 1996)
- "Landlocked Blues" (I'm Wide Awake, It's Morning, 2005)
- "Laura Laurent" (Lifted or The Story Is in the Soil, Keep Your Ear to the Ground, 2002)
- "Let's Not Shit Ourselves (To Love and Be Loved)" (Lifted or The Story Is in the Soil, Keep Your Ear to the Ground, 2002)
- "Let the Distance Bring Us Together" (Home Volume IV: Bright Eyes & Britt Daniel, 2002)
- "Light Pollution" (Digital Ash in a Digital Urn, 2005)
- "Lila" (A Collection of Songs Written and Recorded 1995–1997, 1998)
- "Lime Tree" (Cassadaga, 2007)
- "A Line Allows Progress, a Circle Does Not" (Every Day and Every Night, 1999)
- "Little Drummer Boy" (A Christmas Album, 2002)
- "Loose Leaves" (There Is No Beginning to the Story, 2002)
- "Lover I Don't Have to Love" (3 More Hit Songs From Bright Eyes, 2002, and Lifted or The Story Is in the Soil, Keep Your Ear to the Ground, 2002)
- "Lovers Turn Into Monsters" (Insound Tour Support Series No. 12, 2000)
- "Lua" (Lua single, 2004, and I'm Wide Awake, It's Morning, 2005)

== M ==
- "A Machine Spiritual (In The People's Key)" (The People's Key, 2011)
- "Make a Plan to Love Me" (Cassadaga, 2007)
- "Make War" (Lifted or The Story Is in the Soil, Keep Your Ear to the Ground, 2002, and Motion Sickness, 2005)
- "Man Named Truth" (Live, released on Monsters of Folk, 2009, with Monsters of Folk)
- "Mariana Trench" (Down in the Weeds, Where the World Once Was, 2020)
- "Messenger Bird's Song" (There Is No Beginning to the Story, 2002)
- "Method Acting" (Lifted or The Story Is in the Soil, Keep Your Ear to the Ground, 2002, and Motion Sickness, 2005)
- "Middleman" (Cassadaga, 2007)
- "Mirrors and Fevers" (Don't Be Frightened of Turning the Page EP, 2001, and Noise Floor (Rarities: 1998–2005), 2006)
- "Motion Sickness" (Motion Sickness 7", 2000)
- "The Movement of a Hand" (Fevers and Mirrors, 2000)

== N ==
- "Napoleon's Hat" (Lagniappe, 2005)
- "Neely O'Hara" (Every Day and Every Night, 1999)
- "A New Arrangement" (Every Day and Every Night, 1999)
- "The Night Before Christmas" (A Christmas Album, 2002)
- "No Lies, Just Love" (Oh Holy Fools: The Music of Son, Ambulance & Bright Eyes, 2001, and Don't Be Frightened of Turning the Page, 2001)
- "No One Would Riot For Less" (Cassadaga, 2007)
- "No Prayer" (Live)
- "North of the City" (Kill The Monster Before It Eats the Baby, 1996)
- "Nothing Gets Crossed Out" (Lifted or The Story Is in the Soil, Keep Your Ear to the Ground, 2002)

== O ==
- "Oh Little Town of Bethlehem" (A Christmas Album, 2002)
- "Oh, You Are the Roots That Sleep Beneath My Feet and Hold the Earth in Place" (Oh Holy Fools: The Music of Son, Ambulance & Bright Eyes, 2001, and Don't Be Frightened of Turning the Page, 2001)
- "Old Soul Song (For the New World Order)" (I'm Wide Awake, It's Morning, 2005, and Motion Sickness, 2005)
- "On My Way to Work" (Every Day and Every Night, 1999)
- "One and Done" (Down in the Weeds, Where the World Once Was, 2020)
- "One for You, One for Me" (The People's Key, 2011)
- "One Foot in Front of the Other" (Saddle Creek 50, 2002)
- "One Straw (Please)" (A Collection of Songs Written and Recorded 1995–1997, 1998)

== P ==
- "Padraic My Prince" (Letting Off the Happiness, 1998)
- "Pageturner's Rag" (Down in the Weeds, Where the World Once Was, 2020)
- "Pan and Broom" (Down in the Weeds, Where the World Once Was, 2020)
- "Patient Hope in New Snow" (A Collection of Songs Written and Recorded 1995–1997, 1998)
- "A Perfect Sonnet" (Every Day and Every Night, 1999)
- "Persona Non Grata" (Down in the Weeds, Where the World Once Was, 2020)
- "Pioneer's Park (August 17, 1997)" ("Commercial Food Processor", 1999)
- "A Poetic Retelling of an Unfortunate Seduction" (Letting Off the Happiness, 1998)
- "Poison Oak" (I'm Wide Awake, It's Morning, 2005)
- "Puella Quam Amo Est Pulchra" (A Collection of Songs Written and Recorded 1995–1997, 1998)
- "Pull My Hair" (Letting Off the Happiness, 1998)

== R ==
- "Racing Towards The New" (Bright Eyes / Squadcar 96))
- "Reinvent the Wheel" (Four Winds, 2007)
- "Road to Joy" (I'm Wide Awake, It's Morning, 2005)

== S ==
- "Saturday As Usual" (A Collection of Songs Written and Recorded 1995–1997, 1998)
- "A Scale, a Mirror and Those Indifferent Clocks" (Fevers and Mirrors, 2000, and Motion Sickness, 2005)
- "Seashell Tale" (Noise Floor (Rarities: 1998–2005), 2006)
- "Shell Games" (The People's Key, 2011)
- "Ship in a Bottle" (Digital Ash in a Digital Urn, 2005)
- "Silent Night" (A Christmas Album, 2002)
- "Singularity" ("Singularity" single, 2011)
- "Silver Bells" (A Christmas Album, 2002)
- "Smoke Without Fire" (Four Winds, 2007)
- "Solid Jackson" (A Collection of Songs Written and Recorded 1995–1997, 1998)
- "Something Vague" (Fevers and Mirrors, 2000, and Saddle Creek 50, 2002)
- "A Song to Pass the Time" (Fevers and Mirrors, 2000)
- "Soon You Will Be Leaving Your Man" (Motion Sickness 7", 2000)
- "Soul Singer in a Session Band" (Cassadaga, 2007)
- "Southern State" (Home Volume IV: Bright Eyes & Britt Daniel, 2002, and Motion Sickness, 2005)
- "Spent on Rainy Days" (Home Volume IV: Bright Eyes & Britt Daniel, 2002, and Noise Floor (Rarities: 1998–2005), 2006)
- "A Spindle, a Darkness, a Fever, and a Necklace" (Fevers and Mirrors, 2000)
- "Spring Cleaning" (One Jug of Wine, Two Vessels, 2004)
- "Stairwell Song" (Down in the Weeds, Where the World Once Was, 2020)
- "Stray Dog Freedom" (Four Winds, 2007)
- "Sunrise, Sunset" (Fevers and Mirrors, 2000)
- "Supriya" (A Collection of Songs Written and Recorded 1995–1997, 1998)
- "Susan Miller Rag" (Susan Miller Rag 3-inch, shipped with pre-orders of Cassadaga)

== T ==
- "Take It Easy (Love Nothing)" (Take It Easy (Love Nothing) single, 2004, and Digital Ash in a Digital Urn, 2005)
- "Tereza and Tomas" (Letting Off the Happiness, 1998)
- "Theme From Pinata" (Digital Ash in a Digital Urn, 2005)
- "Tilt-A-Whirl" (Down in the Weeds, Where the World Once Was, 2020)
- "Time Code" (Digital Ash in a Digital Urn, 2005)
- "To Death's Heart (In Three Parts)" (Down in the Weeds, Where the World Once Was, 2020)
- "Touch" (Letting Off the Happiness, 1998)
- "Tourist Trap" (Four Winds, 2007)
- "Train Under Water" (I'm Wide Awake, It's Morning, 2005, and Motion Sickness, 2005)
- "Trees Get Wheeled Away" (Lost & Found, Vol. 1 compilation, 2003, and Noise Floor (Rarities: 1998–2005), 2006)
- "Triple Spiral" (The People's Key, 2011)
- "True Blue" (Lua single, 2004, First Day of My Life single, 2005, and Motion Sickness, 2005)

== V ==
- "The Vanishing Act" (Too Much of a Good Thing is a Good Thing 7", 1999, and Noise Floor (Rarities: 1998–2005), 2006)

== W ==
- "Waste of Paint" (Lifted or The Story Is in the Soil, Keep Your Ear to the Ground, 2002)
- "We Are Free Men" (There Is No Beginning to the Story, 2002)
- "We Are Nowhere and It's Now" (I'm Wide Awake, It's Morning, 2005, and Motion Sickness, 2005)
- "Weather Reports" (Noise Floor (Rarities: 1998–2005), 2006)
- "Well Whiskey" (Lua single, 2004)
- "When the Curious Girl Realizes She Is Under Glass" (Fevers and Mirrors, 2000)
- "When the Curious Girl Realizes She Is Under Glass Again" (I Will Be Grateful for This Day, I Will Be Grateful for Each Day to Come, 2001, and Noise Floor (Rarities: 1998–2005), 2006)
- "When the President Talks to God" (When the President Talks to God single, 2005, and First Day of My Life single, 2005)
- "White Christmas" (A Christmas Album, 2002)

== Y ==
- "You Get Yours" (Home Volume IV: Bright Eyes & Britt Daniel, 2002)
- "You Will. You? Will. You? Will. You? Will." (Lifted or The Story Is in the Soil, Keep Your Ear to the Ground, 2002)

== Notable covers ==
- "Big Old House" – originally by Jesse Harris (The Hottest State soundtrack, 2007)
- "The Biggest Lie" – originally by Elliott Smith (Motion Sickness, 2005)
- "Burn Rubber" – originally by Simon Joyner (Take It Easy (Love Nothing) single, 2004)
- "Crazy As a Loon" – originally by John Prine
- "Devil Town" – originally by Daniel Johnston (The Late Great Daniel Johnston: Discovered Covered, 2004, and Noise Floor (Rarities: 1998–2005), 2006)
- "I Woke Up With This Song in My Head This Morning" – originally by The Bruces (Lua single, 2004)
- "Joy Division" – originally by Simon Joyner
- "Metal Firecracker" – originally by Lucinda Williams
- "Mushaboom" – originally by Feist (Motion Sickness, 2005)
- "Out on the Weekend" – originally by Neil Young (3 More Hit Songs From Bright Eyes, 2002, and There Is No Beginning to the Story, 2002)
- "Papa Was a Rodeo" – originally by The Magnetic Fields (SCORE! 20 Years of Merge Records: THE COVERS!, 2009)
- "Sharp Cutting Wings (Song to a Poet)" – originally by Lucinda Williams
- "Walls" – originally by Tom Petty and the Heartbreakers

== See also ==
- Bright Eyes discography
- List of songs with Conor Oberst
