= Make War =

Make War may refer to:

- "Make War", a 2002 song by Bright Eyes from Lifted or The Story Is in the Soil, Keep Your Ear to the Ground
- "Make War", a 2017 song by From First to Last
