= Motion Sickness =

Motion Sickness may refer to:

- Motion sickness, nausea caused by motion or perceived motion
- Motion Sickness (album), a 2005 live album by Bright Eyes
- "Motion Sickness" (Bright Eyes song), 2000
- "Motion Sickness" (Phoebe Bridgers song), 2017
