= Zack Nipper =

American album cover artist

Zack Nipper is an American artist from Omaha, Nebraska. He has designed several album covers by bands such as Bright Eyes, Criteria, Georgie James and Desaparecidos. Zack won "Best Recording Package" for his work on Bright Eyes' Cassadaga at the 2008 Grammy Awards, giving him, as well as Saddle Creek Records their first Grammy. In 2008, after his Grammy Award, several of Nipper's drawings for the album were displayed at the Joslyn Art Museum in "Zack Nipper: The Cassadaga Drawings" organized by then-senior curator of collections, John Wilson.

In January 2011, it was announced that Nipper's work on The People's Key had won the Best Art Vinyl award.

He is a great-grandson of efficiency experts Frank Bunker Gilbreth, Sr. and Lillian Moller Gilbreth, whose life story was told in the book and film "Cheaper By The Dozen".

== Selected works ==
- artwork - Criteria - Prevent the World single (2005 · Saddle Creek Records)
- artwork - Criteria - When We Break (2005 · Saddle Creek Records)
- artwork - Desaparecidos - Read Music/Speak Spanish (2002 · Saddle Creek Records)
- artwork - Bright Eyes - There Is No Beginning to the Story, "Four Winds EP", "Lua EP", "I'm Wide Awake, It's Morning", "Every Day and Every Night", "The People's Key"
