= Todd Fink =

American singer

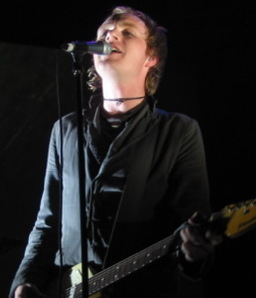
Fink in 2004

Todd Fink (né Baechle; born March 3, 1974 in Omaha, Nebraska) is the lead singer of the band The Faint. He attended Omaha's Westside High School.

== Career ==
Fink was also one of four members of the band Commander Venus, which was started by Conor Oberst in Omaha in 1994, and also included Tim Kasher and Robb Nansel. The band released two albums before it broke up: 1995's Do You Feel at Home? and 1997's Uneventful Vacation. The band released music on Lumberjack Records (later known as Saddle Creek Records) and New York's Wind-up Records.

As lead singer of The Faint, (formerly Norman Bailer), Fink has expanded his musical repertoire from the Commander Venus/Park Ave.-reminiscent Media to the more mature, acid-freak-out records Blank-Wave Arcade and Danse Macabre to the slightly mellowed Wet from Birth. With Fink in The Faint is his brother Clark Baechle on drums; Jacob Thiele on synth; Joel Peterson on bass; and the mysterious "Dapose" on guitar (Dapose joined the band during the recording of Danse Macabre).

In March 2005, he married Orenda Fink (of Azure Ray), subsequently taking her surname as his married name. His original surname "Baechle" is pronounced "Beck-lee".

In 2007, Fink, Jacob Thiele, and Derek Pressnall (of Tilly and the Wall) started the dance party GOO, but tour schedules and Omaha venue changes shut the party down.

== Album appearances ==
- Bright Eyes - A Collection of Songs Written and Recorded 1995–1997 (1998 - Saddle Creek)
- Bright Eyes - Fevers and Mirrors (2000, Saddle Creek Records)
- Bright Eyes - There Is No Beginning to the Story (2002, Saddle Creek)
- Bright Eyes - Lifted or The Story is in the Soil, Keep Your Ear to the Ground (2002, Saddle Creek)
- Cursive - The Ugly Organ (2003, Saddle Creek)
- Steve Aoki - Pillowface and His Airplane Chronicles (2007, Thrive)
- Felix Cartal - Popular Music (2010, Dim Mak Records)
