= Down in the Weeds, Where the World Once Was =

Studio album by Bright Eyes
- Released: August 21, 2020
- Recorded: 2019
- Studios: ARC (Omaha); Electro-Vox (Los Angeles); Capitol (Hollywood); Pageturners Lounge (Omaha)
- Genres: Indie rock; indie folk; alternative country; indietronica
- Length: 54:45
- Label: Dead Oceans
- Producer: Bright Eyes

Bright Eyes chronology
The People's Key (2011)	Down in the Weeds, Where the World Once Was (2020)	Five Dice, All Threes (2024)

Singles from Down in the Weeds, Where the World Once Was
- 1. "Persona Non Grata" Released: March 24, 2020; 2. "Forced Convalescence" Released: April 21, 2020; 3. "One and Done" Released: May 27, 2020; 4. "Mariana Trench" Released: June 22, 2020

Down in the Weeds, Where the World Once Was is the tenth studio album by American band Bright Eyes. The album marked the band's first release in nearly a decade, following The People's Key in 2011. It was released by Dead Oceans on August 21, 2020, and it was their first album not released by Saddle Creek Records. The album was recorded at Electro-Vox and Capitol Studios in Los Angeles and ARC Studios in Omaha, Nebraska.

The album features musical contributions from drummer Jon Theodore and Red Hot Chili Peppers bassist Flea, who had previously recorded The Mars Volta's 2003 debut studio record De-Loused in the Comatorium together.

Down in the Weeds was preceded by four singles: "Persona Non Grata", "Forced Convalescence", "One and Done", and "Mariana Trench". The album received favorable reviews from critics and peaked at number 36 on the Billboard 200.

== Background and recording ==
In 2009, Conor Oberst suggested that the next Bright Eyes album would be the band's last, after which he would retire the project. In February 2011, the band released their ninth studio album The People's Key. However, shortly thereafter Oberst told Rolling Stone that he was "definitely not making it official" as to whether the album would be the band's last. The band performed their last show in Honolulu, Hawaii on November 21, 2011. Bright Eyes went on an unofficial hiatus as members Conor Oberst, Mike Mogis, and Nate Walcott each pursued different projects. However, all three members remained in close contact with each other. Oberst, who lives in Omaha, Nebraska and Los Angeles, California, lives next door to Mogis in Omaha and minutes away from Walcott in Los Angeles. During the hiatus, Oberst released three solo albums: Upside Down Mountain (2014), Ruminations (2016), and Salutations (2017). Oberst also released a second Desaparecidos album, Payola (2015), and formed the indie rock project Better Oblivion Community Center with Phoebe Bridgers, releasing an eponymous album in 2019. In 2014, Mogis and Walcott composed the soundtrack for The Fault in Our Stars, based on the novel of the same name by John Green. During the hiatus, Mogis also provided musical and technical contributions to music by other artists, while Walcott provided musical and songwriting contributions to other artists' music and scored other films. Walcott also worked as a touring member of other musical groups, including Broken Bells and Red Hot Chili Peppers.

In the November 2016 issue of Uncut, Oberst expressed doubt as to whether or not The People's Key would be the band's final album and revealed that Bright Eyes "still talk about doing another record." Bright Eyes' return began at a Christmas party in 2017 at Walcott's house. Oberst pitched the idea of regrouping Bright Eyes to Walcott, and he and Walcott huddled in a bathroom and called Mogis over FaceTime, who was Christmas shopping at a mall in Omaha. Mogis agreed to regroup, and the band began working again. It was a collaborative effort, with the band writing material for the album in Omaha and California. The album was recorded in 2019 at Mogis' ARC Studios in Omaha, and at Electro-Vox Recording Studios and Capitol Studios, both located in Los Angeles. The album also features contributions from drummer Jon Theodore (The Mars Volta, Queens of the Stone Age, One Day as a Lion) and Red Hot Chili Peppers bassist Flea.

The album is dedicated to Oberst's brother Matt, who died in November 2016. The album also comes in the aftermath of Oberst's divorce in 2017 from Corina Figueroa Escamilla, whom he was married to for seven years. However, she is featured speaking in Spanish on the album's opening track, "Pageturners Rag".

== Release ==
On January 9, 2020, Bright Eyes teased a comeback on their social media accounts with a cryptic animation alongside the hashtag "#BrightEyes2020". On January 21, 2020, the band announced their return with a series of 2020 tour dates, their first live performances in nine years. The band scheduled performances in Tokyo in March, Los Angeles in May, New York City in June, and at England's End of the Road Festival in September. They band also announced plans to release new music and revealed Bright Eyes had signed to Dead Oceans. Before signing to Dead Oceans, Bright Eyes had released all of their studio albums on Saddle Creek Records.

On February 18, 2020, Bright Eyes announced a North American tour for May–June 2020, supported by Lucy Dacus, Lavender Diamond, and Japanese Breakfast. They also announced a UK and European tour for August–September 2020. On April 24, 2020, Bright Eyes cancelled most of the scheduled North American tour dates and postponed the remaining dates due to the COVID-19 pandemic. On May 23, 2020, the band cancelled dates on the scheduled UK and European tour and postponed the remaining dates to 2021. The band performed the first show of their tour on July 27, 2021, at Artpark Amphitheatre in Lewiston, New York.

"Persona Non Grata" was released as the album's lead single on March 24, 2020. "Forced Convalescence" was released as the second single on April 21, 2020. "One and Done" was released as the third single on May 27, 2020. "Mariana Trench" was released as the fourth single on June 22, 2020, and was performed the same day by Bright Eyes on The Late Show with Stephen Colbert. The album's title, artwork, tracklisting, and release date were also announced the same day. Down in the Weeds, Where the World Once Was was released by Dead Oceans on August 21, 2020. The band gave a track-by-track breakdown of the album for Apple Music.

== Artwork ==
The album's artwork was created by Zack Nipper, a former Saddle Creek Records graphic designer, who designed the cover artwork for most of Bright Eyes' previous albums and won the Grammy Award for Best Recording Package for his work on their album Cassadaga (2007).

== Critical reception ==
Professional ratings
Aggregate scores
Source	Rating
AnyDecentMusic?	7.7/10
Metacritic	81/100
Review scores
Source	Rating
AllMusic	4/5 stars
The A.V. Club	A−
Exclaim!	6/10
The Independent	4/5 stars
NME	4/5 stars
Paste	8.2/10
Pitchfork	7.4/10
Q	4/5 stars
Rolling Stone	3.5/5 stars
Uncut	9/10

Down in the Weeds received favorable reviews from music critics. The album has a score of 81 out of 100 on Metacritic, indicating "universal acclaim", based on 24 reviews.

Fred Thomas of AllMusic wrote that "it continues Bright Eyes' evolution without skipping a beat, and manages to be one of their stronger records in the process." Bud Scoppa of Uncut gave the album a 9/10, praising the "opulent orchestrations and chorales rendering Oberst's tremulous outpourings that much more existentially fraught." Tom Doyle of Q praised the album's "smart audio trickery and intriguing atmosphere" as well as Oberst's vocals for being "less nervy and whiny and more restrained and affecting".

Tom Hull was less impressed, giving the album a B-plus and finding its extensive musical accomplishment ostensibly significant but not entirely worth exploring.

=== Year-end lists ===
Year-end list accolades for Down in the Weeds, Where the World Once Was
Publication	List	Rank	Ref.
Double J	The 50 best albums of 2020	21	
NBHAP	50 Best Albums of 2020	9	
Slant Magazine	The 50 Best Albums of 2020	40	
The Sunday Times	The best albums of 2020	5	
Uncut	The Top 75 Albums of the Year	45	
Under the Radar	Top 100 Albums of 2020	50	

== Track listing ==
All lyrics are written by Conor Oberst, except bridge lyrics on "Just Once in the World" by Miwi La Lupa; all music is composed by Bright Eyes.

Down in the Weeds, Where the World Once Was track listing
No.	Title	Length
1.	"Pageturners Rag"	3:57
2.	"Dance and Sing"	4:30
3.	"Just Once in the World"	3:28
4.	"Mariana Trench"	3:41
5.	"One and Done"	4:53
6.	"Pan and Broom"	2:52
7.	"Stairwell Song"	3:40
8.	"Persona Non Grata"	3:32
9.	"Tilt-A-Whirl"	2:20
10.	"Hot Car in the Sun"	2:27
11.	"Forced Convalescence"	4:08
12.	"To Death's Heart (In Three Parts)"	5:25
13.	"Calais to Dover"	4:17
14.	"Comet Song"	5:35
Total length:		54:45

== Personnel ==
Credits adapted from the album's liner notes.

=== Musicians ===
Bright Eyes

- Conor Oberst – vocals, acoustic guitar, piano
- Mike Mogis – electric guitar, pedal steel, banjo, Marxophone, synth bass, percussion, programming, hammer dulcimer, bajo sexto
- Nathaniel Walcott – piano, trumpet, flugelhorn, orchestral and choir arrangements, Hammond organ, electric pianos, synthesizers, vibraphone, Omnichord, Mellotron, harpsichord

Additional musicians

- Corina Figueroa Escamilla – vocals (track 1)
- Nancy Oberst – vocals (track 1)
- Miwi La Lupa – vocals (tracks 3, 4, 5, 14)
- Andy LeMaster – vocals (tracks 9, 13)
- Susan Sanchez – vocals (tracks 6, 8)
- Jesca Hoop – vocals (tracks 4, 12)
- Dan McCarthy – piano (track 1)
- Flea – bass (tracks 2, 4, 5, 7, 11, 12, 14)
- Macey Taylor – bass (tracks 3, 8, 9, 10, 13)
- Jenny Lee Lindberg – bass (track 6)
- Jon Theodore – drums (tracks 2–14), percussion (tracks 2–14), timpani (tracks 2–14)
- Kip Skitter – percussion (tracks 2, 4, 11)
- Joe Fuchs – bagpipes (track 8)
- Joe Todero – bagpipes (track 8)
- Malcolm Wilbur – bagpipes (track 8)
- Suzie Katayama – orchestra conductor (tracks 2, 5, 7, 14)
- Jason McGee – choir conductor (tracks 2, 11)
- James Connor – choir vocals (tracks 2, 11)
- Quishima Dixon – choir vocals (tracks 2, 11)
- Natalie Ganther – choir vocals (tracks 2, 11)
- Anthony Johnston – choir vocals (tracks 2, 11)
- Edward Lawson – choir vocals (tracks 2, 11)
- Jennifer Lee – choir vocals (tracks 2, 11)
- Sharetta Morgan-Harmon – choir vocals (tracks 2, 11)
- Marquee Perkins – choir vocals (tracks 2, 11)
- Jessica Guideri – violin (tracks 2, 5, 7, 14)
- Tammy Hatwan – violin (tracks 2, 5, 7, 14)
- Jackie Brand – violin (tracks 2, 5, 7, 14)
- Roberto Cani – violin (tracks 2, 5, 7, 14)
- Paul Cartwright – violin (tracks 2, 5, 7, 14)
- Nina Evtuhov – violin (tracks 2, 5, 7, 14)
- Gerry Hilera – violin (tracks 2, 5, 7, 14)
- Ana Landauer – violin (tracks 2, 5, 7, 14)
- Natalie Leggett – violin (tracks 2, 5, 7, 14)
- Michele Richards – violin (tracks 2, 5, 7, 14)
- Jenny Takamatsu – violin (tracks 2, 5, 7, 14)
- John Wittenberg – violin (tracks 2, 5, 7, 14)
- Rob Brophy – viola (tracks 2, 5, 7, 14)
- Tom Lea – viola (tracks 2, 5, 7, 14)
- Luke Maurer – viola (tracks 2, 5, 7, 14)
- Rodney Wirtz – viola (tracks 2, 5, 7, 14)
- Vanessa Freebairn-Smith – cello (tracks 2, 5, 7, 14)
- Erika Duka – cello (tracks 2, 5, 7, 14)
- Dane Little – cello (tracks 2, 5, 7, 14)
- Charlie Tyler – cello (tracks 2, 5, 7, 14)
- Johanna Borenstein – flute (tracks 2, 7, 14)
- Lara Wickes – oboe (tracks 2, 7, 14), English horn (tracks 2, 7, 14)
- Don Foster – clarinet (tracks 2, 7, 14)
- John Mitchell – baritone saxophone (tracks 4, 5)
- Jon Lewis – trumpet (tracks 2, 4, 5, 7, 14)
- Daniel Rosenboom – trumpet (tracks 2, 4, 5, 7, 14)
- Alex Iles – trombone (tracks 2, 4, 5, 7, 14)
- Steve Holtman – trombone (tracks 2, 4, 5, 7, 14)

=== Technical ===
- Bright Eyes – production (all tracks)
- Mike Mogis – mixing (all tracks), engineering (tracks 1, 3, 8, 9, 10, 13)
- Michael Harris – engineering (tracks 2, 4, 5, 6, 7, 11, 12, 14)
- Steve Churchyard – engineering (tracks 2, 4, 5, 7, 11, 14)
- Adam Roberts – assistant engineer (tracks 1, 3, 8, 9, 10, 13)
- Nik Fackler – assistant engineer (track 1)
- Aaron Gum – assistant engineer (track 1)
- Chris Cerullo – assistant engineer (tracks 2, 4, 5, 6, 7, 11, 12, 14)
- Chandler Harrod – assistant engineer (tracks 2, 4, 5, 7, 11, 14)
- Andy LeMaster – assistant engineer (tracks 9, 13)
- Tim Thomas – assistant engineer (tracks 4, 12)
- Bob Ludwig – mastering (all tracks)

=== Artwork ===
- Zack Nipper – artwork, layout
- Rob Walters – diorama photography

== Charts ==
Chart performance for Down in the Weeds, Where the World Once Was
Chart (2020)	Peak position
Australian Albums (ARIA)	67
Austrian Albums (Ö3 Austria)	21
Belgian Albums (Ultratop Flanders)	34
Dutch Albums (Album Top 100)	62
German Albums (Offizielle Top 100)	8
Scottish Albums (Official Charts)	6
Swiss Albums (Schweizer Hitparade)	32
UK Albums (Official Charts)	22
US Billboard 200	36
US Top Alternative Albums (Billboard)	4
US Americana/Folk Albums (Billboard)	4
US Independent Albums (Billboard)	9
US Top Rock Albums (Billboard)	3
