= Jiha Lee =

American musician

Jiha Lee is the former keyboardist of the Good Life and has performed with Bright Eyes. Having left the Good Life after their second album, Black Out, she returned to record the track "Inmates" for Album of the Year. Her recordings with Bright Eyes include vocals and flute on tracks from Fevers and Mirrors, Lifted, and Digital Ash in a Digital Urn. She also played the flute on the track "Hail To Whatever You Found in the Sunlight That Surrounds You" on the Rilo Kiley album The Execution of All Things.

== Album appearances ==
- Bright Eyes - Fevers and Mirrors (2000 · Saddle Creek)
- Sorry About Dresden - The Convenience of Indecision (2001 · Saddle Creek)
- The Good Life - Black Out (2002 · Saddle Creek)
- Bright Eyes - There Is No Beginning to the Story (2002 · Saddle Creek)
- Bright Eyes - Lifted or The Story Is in the Soil, Keep Your Ear to the Ground (2002 · Saddle Creek)
- Rilo Kiley - The Execution of All Things (2002 · Saddle Creek)
- Tilly and the Wall - Wild Like Children (2004 · Team Love)
- The Good Life - Album of the Year (2004 · Saddle Creek)
- Bright Eyes - Digital Ash in a Digital Urn (2005 · Saddle Creek)
