= A Christmas Album (Bright Eyes album) =

Studio album by Bright Eyes
- Released: December 1, 2002
- Genre: Christmas; lo-fi; indie folk; slowcore
- Length: 32:03
- Label: Saddle Creek

Bright Eyes chronology
Lifted or The Story is in the Soil, Keep Your Ear to the Ground (2002)	A Christmas Album (2002)	One Jug of Wine, Two Vessels (2004)

Alternative cover
- 2013 reissue cover

A Christmas Album is the fifth studio album and first Christmas album by Bright Eyes released in 2002. The proceeds of the album go to the Nebraska AIDS Project.

"Have Yourself a Merry Little Christmas" appeared in the films Imaginary Heroes and Krampus, and "Blue Christmas" was featured in an episode of The O.C., entitled "The Best Chrismukkah Ever". Initially released only online as a CD through the Saddle Creek website, it was released on 180-gram white vinyl in 2009. In 2013, Pitchfork described the album generally positively, stating that it sounded "like a field recording from chilly church basements [in Omaha]." It subsequently has been widely celebrated and re-released numerous times, including in 2023 by the indie label Dead Oceans.

This album is the 48th release of Saddle Creek Records.

== Track listing ==
A Christmas Album track listing
No.	Title	Length
1.	"Away in a Manger"	2:48
2.	"Blue Christmas"	2:20
3.	"Oh Little Town of Bethlehem"	2:58
4.	"God Rest Ye Merry Gentlemen"	1:53
5.	"The First Noël"	2:30
6.	"Little Drummer Boy"	2:35
7.	"White Christmas"	1:36
8.	"Silent Night"	3:14
9.	"Silver Bells"	3:54
10.	"Have Yourself a Merry Little Christmas"	4:08
11.	"The Night Before Christmas"	4:08
Total length:		32:03

== Personnel ==
The album was arranged by Conor Oberst and Maria Taylor. The performers also include Jake Bellows, Gretta Cohn, Armand Costanzo, Denver Dalley, Stefanie Drootin, Orenda Fink, Neely Jenkins, Jiha Lee, Andy LeMaster, Mike Mogis, Matt Oberst, Stephen Pedersen, Blake Sennett, Macey Taylor, and Nick White.
