= Bright Eyes / Squad Car 96 =

Bright Eyes / Squadcar 96

EP by Bright Eyes / Squadcar 96
- Released: 1997
- Genre: Lo-Fi; indie rock
- Label: H.; Aquamudvuv

Bright Eyes chronology
Bright Eyes / Squadcar 96 (1997)	A Collection of Songs Written and Recorded 1995–1997 (1998)

Bright Eyes / Squad Car 96 is a 1997 split EP with Bright Eyes and Squadcar 96.

== Track listing ==
1. "Racing Towards The New" – Bright Eyes
2. "Go Find Yourself A Dry Place" – Bright Eyes
3. "Dusk Soccer" – Squadcar 96
4. "Verandahli Dotslap" – Squadcar 96

== Credits ==
1. Bass – Dave O'Halloran (tracks: B1, B2)
2. Clarinet – Christina Paskulich (tracks: B1, B2)
3. Drums – Carl Guy (tracks: B1, B2), Tim Kasher (tracks: A1, A2)
4. Flute – Pugsley B. Wateringcan (tracks: B1, B2)
5. Guitar – Matthew Sullivan (2) (tracks: B1, B2)
6. Guitar, Vocals – Andrew Sousa (tracks: B1, B2), Conor Oberst (tracks: A1, A2)
7. Mixed By – Benton Silla (tracks: B1, B2), Squadcar 96 (tracks: B1, B2)
8. Recorded By – Benton Silla (tracks: B1, B2), Conor Oberst (tracks: A1, A2)

== Notes ==
1. The 7-inch vinyl has been seen to sell for over US$2000.
2. Only 150 copies were pressed
