= Insound Tour Support No.12 =

Insound Tour Support No. 12

EP by Bright Eyes and Son, Ambulance
- Released: 2000
- Genre: Lo-fi
- Labels: Saddle Creek; Insound

Bright Eyes and Son, Ambulance chronology
Fevers and Mirrors (2000)	Insound Tour Support No. 12 (2000)	Don't Be Frightened of Turning the Page (2000)

Insound Tour Support No. 12 is a 2000 split EP by Bright Eyes and Son, Ambulance, released through Saddle Creek Records.

The version of "I Won't Ever Be Happy Again" is an older recording than the one found on "Don't Be Frightened of Turning the Page".

== Track listing ==
1. "I Won't Ever Be Happy Again" - Bright Eyes
2. "The Joy in Discovery" - Bright Eyes
3. "The Joy in Forgetting/The Joy in Acceptance" - Bright Eyes
4. "Like Billy Budd or Cyrano de Begerac" - Son, Ambulance
5. "The Woman in the Underpass" - Son, Ambulance
6. "Astrud, Astrud" - Son, Ambulance
7. "Lovers Turn Into Monsters" - Bright Eyes
