= The People's Key =

Studio album by Bright Eyes
- Released: February 15, 2011
- Studio: ARC (Omaha)
- Genres: Indie rock; indie pop; indie folk; indietronica
- Length: 46:58
- Label: Saddle Creek
- Producer: Mike Mogis

Bright Eyes chronology
| Cassadaga (2007) | The People's Key (2011) | Down in the Weeds, Where the World Once Was (2020) |

Singles from The People's Key
- 1. "Shell Games" Released: 2011

Singles from The People's Key: A Companion
- 1. "When You Were Mine (Companion version)" Released: May 9, 2023

The People's Key is the ninth studio album by American band Bright Eyes. The album was recorded in Omaha, Nebraska at ARC Studios, produced by Mike Mogis, and engineered by Mogis and Andy LeMaster. The album was released on February 15, 2011, lead singer Conor Oberst's 31st birthday, by Saddle Creek Records. Prior to its official release, the album was available to stream online in its entirety, as part of NPR's "First Listen" series.

The album features guest artists Andy LeMaster of Now It's Overhead, Matt Maginn of Cursive, Carla Azar of Autolux, Clark Baechle of The Faint, Shane Aspegren of The Berg Sans Nipple, Laura Burhenn of The Mynabirds, and Denny Brewer of Refried Ice Cream. The lyrics make mention of Haile Selassie, the Lion of Judah and I and I; all things associated with Rastafari.

The album was reissued by Dead Oceans alongside a six-track companion EP on June 16, 2023.

== Packaging ==
According to designer Zack Nipper, the basic idea for the "wall of fire" design came from Conor Oberst, who wanted it to be "visually striking". The design was created using cut paper, similar to the cover for Every Day and Every Night, the first Bright Eyes release Nipper had worked on. Nipper stated that he "designed for vinyl first, then CD, and MP3 last, because that's the order in which viewing it matters."

The first 50,000 copies of this album came with a limited-edition packaging similar to that of all copies of the LP record, in a 6-panel tri-fold die-cut digipak printed on iridescent foil, and including an O-card, full-color CD inner sleeve and a 20-page booklet.

In January 2011, it was announced that The People's Key had won the Best Art Vinyl award.

== Critical reception ==
Professional ratings
Aggregate scores
| Source | Rating |
|---|---|
| AnyDecentMusic? | 6.7/10 |
| Metacritic | 70/100 |
Review scores
| Source | Rating |
| AllMusic | 3.5/5 stars |
| American Songwriter | 4/5 stars |
| Consequence of Sound | 3.5/5 stars |
| Los Angeles Times | 3/4 stars |
| NME | 8/10 |
| Pitchfork | 5.0/10 |
| PopMatters | 6/10 |
| Rolling Stone | 3.5/5 stars |
| Slant Magazine | 2/5 stars |
| Spin | 7/10 |

The People's Key has received mixed to positive critical reception. At Metacritic, which assigns a normalized rating out of 100 to reviews from mainstream critics, the album received an average score of 70, based on 35 reviews, which indicates "generally favorable reviews".

AllMusic praised its smaller scale and gave the album 3 and a 1/2 out of 5 stars. Pitchfork gave the album 5 out of 10 and criticized the "impersonal" feel of the songs, yet praised "Ladder Song". Slant Magazine gave the album 2 out of a possible 5 stars. No Ripcord gave the album a 6 out of 10 and commented, "There's not a lot fundamentally wrong with The People's Key; it's just that we know Bright Eyes can do better." However, Drowned in Sound and NME gave the album 9 out of 10 and 8 out of 10 respectively, with NME calling it a "sleek electro-tinged classic" and praising Oberst's more electric musical direction, saying it brought a "fresh strain of Bright Eyes record".

== Commercial performance ==
The album debuted at number 13 on the Billboard 200, and made it to number 7 on the Alternative Albums chart. The People's Key also reached number 46 on the UK Albums Chart.

== Track listing ==
All tracks are written by Conor Oberst, except where noted.

| No. | Title | Length |
|---|---|---|
| 1. | "Firewall" | 7:16 |
| 2. | "Shell Games" | 3:55 |
| 3. | "Jejune Stars" | 4:10 |
| 4. | "Approximate Sunlight" | 4:24 |
| 5. | "Haile Selassie" | 4:33 |
| 6. | "A Machine Spiritual (in the People's Key)" | 4:19 |
| 7. | "Triple Spiral" | 3:50 |
| 8. | "Beginner's Mind" | 3:55 |
| 9. | "Ladder Song" | 3:58 |
| 10. | "One for You, One for Me" | 6:38 |
| Total length: | | 46:58 |

iTunes pre-order edition bonus track
| No. | Title | Length |
|---|---|---|
| 11. | "Singularity" | 4:30 |

Deluxe pre-order edition bonus tracks
| No. | Title | Length |
|---|---|---|
| 11. | "Singularity" | 4:30 |
| 12. | "In the Real World" | 3:36 |

The People's Key: A Companion
| No. | Title | Length |
|---|---|---|
| 1. | "Jejune Stars" (companion version) | 4:28 |
| 2. | "Firewall" (companion version) | 4:54 |
| 3. | "When You Were Mine" (Prince Rogers Nelson) | 4:55 |
| 4. | "Approximate Sunlight" (companion version) | 3:55 |
| 5. | "A Machine Spiritual (The People's Key)" (companion version) | 4:22 |
| 6. | "Beginner's Mind" (companion version) | 3:36 |

A limited edition deluxe edition contains MP3 file samples of various Saddle Creek artists.

== Personnel ==
- Conor Oberst – vocals, guitars, pianos and keyboards
- Mike Mogis – guitars, pedal steel, effects, programming and percussion
- Nate Walcott – synthesizers, pianos, organs and Mellotron
- Andy LeMaster – vocals on tracks 1, 2, 3, 4, 6, 8, guitar on tracks 4, 10, bass guitar on track 10
- Matt Maginn – bass guitar on tracks 1, 2, 3, 4, 5, 6, 7, 8
- Carla Azar – drums, percussion on tracks 2, 6, 8
- Clark Baechle – drums on tracks 1, 3, 4, 5, 7
- Shane Agsperen – drums on track 10, additional drums on track 3, additional percussion on track 2
- Laura Burhenn – vocals on tracks 4, 7, 8
- Denny Brewer – shamanic vocals

== Charts ==
Chart performance for The People's Key
| Chart (2011) | Peak position |
|---|---|
| Australian Albums (ARIA) | 55 |
| Austrian Albums (Ö3 Austria) | 36 |
| Belgian Albums (Ultratop Flanders) | 60 |
| Canadian Albums (Nielsen SoundScan) | 38 |
| Dutch Albums (Album Top 100) | 67 |
| Dutch Alternative Albums (Alternative Top 30) | 8 |
| German Albums (Offizielle Top 100) | 42 |
| Irish Albums (IRMA) | 49 |
| Norwegian Albums (VG-lista) | 21 |
| Scottish Albums (Official Charts) | 50 |
| Swedish Albums (Sverigetopplistan) | 39 |
| Swiss Albums (Schweizer Hitparade) | 50 |
| UK Albums (Official Charts) | 46 |
| US Billboard 200 | 13 |
| US Independent Albums (Billboard) | 3 |
| US Indie Store Album Sales (Billboard) | 1 |
| US Top Alternative Albums (Billboard) | 3 |
| US Top Rock Albums (Billboard) | 3 |
