= Noise Floor (Rarities: 1998–2005) =

Compilation album by Bright Eyes
- Released: October 9, 2006
- Recorded: 1998–2005
- Genre: Indie rock; indie folk; lo-fi
- Length: 60:58
- Label: Saddle Creek (US); Village Again (Japan)

Bright Eyes chronology
Motion Sickness (2005)	Noise Floor (Rarities: 1998–2005) (2006)	Four Winds (2007)

Vinyl cover

Singles from Noise Floor: A Companion
- 1. "Blue Angels Air Show (Companion version)" Released: May 9, 2023

Noise Floor (Rarities: 1998–2005) is a compilation of previously recorded but unreleased or hard-to-find songs by Bright Eyes. The compilation album collects selected Bright Eyes singles, one-offs, unreleased tracks, collaborations and covers recorded between 1998 and 2005.

The album was reissued by Dead Oceans alongside a seven-track companion EP on June 16, 2023.

== Background ==
"Motion Sickness" was originally released as a standalone single in 2000.

== Release ==
The compilation was released on CD and vinyl in Europe on October 9, 2006, and in the US on October 24, 2006 on Saddle Creek Records. The vinyl version of the album includes five extra tracks not found on the CD. Unlike the cover pictured, sometimes the artwork consists of a case completely decorated in flowers, there is no text on the case, and the cover pictured is sometimes included over the other cover. The inlay includes lyrics and a personal comment from Conor Oberst for most songs.

== Critical reception ==
Professional ratings
Aggregate scores
Source	Rating
Metacritic	67/100
Review scores
Source	Rating
AllMusic	link
Pitchfork Media	6.4/10 link
Robert Christgau	link

Noise Floor (Rarities: 1998–2005) received mostly positive reviews from contemporary music critics. At Metacritic, which assigns a normalized rating out of 100 to reviews from mainstream critics, the album received an average score of 67, based on 19 reviews, which indicates "generally favorable reviews".

== Track listing ==
All tracks are written by Conor Oberst, except where noted.

No.	Title	Original album	Length
1.	"Mirrors and Fevers"	Don't Be Frightened of Turning the Page (EP) - 2000	3:01
2.	"I Will Be Grateful for This Day"	Sub Pop Singles Club (7") - 2001	4:19
3.	"Trees Get Wheeled Away"	Lost & Found, Volume 1 compilation - 2003	4:09
4.	"Drunk Kid Catholic"	Drunk Kid Catholic (EP) - 2001	3:10
5.	"Spent on Rainy Days"	Home Volume IV split (EP) on Post Parlo Records - 2002	2:06
6.	"The Vanishing Act"	Too Much of a Good Thing (7") - 1999	3:08
7.	"Soon You Will Be Leaving Your Man"	Motion Sickness (7") - 2000	5:12
8.	"Blue Angels Air Show"	DIW Magazine (7") - 2002	3:11
9.	"Weather Reports"	Unreleased (7") with M. Ward	3:02
10.	"Seashell Tale"	Unreleased (7") with M. Ward	3:27
11.	"Bad Blood"	The Album Leaf split (7") - 2001	4:40
12.	"Amy in the White Coat"	3 More Hit Songs from Bright Eyes (UK single) - 2002	5:25
13.	"Devil Town" (Daniel Johnston)	The Late Great Daniel Johnston compilation - 2004	3:03
14.	"I've Been Eating (For You)"	Drunk Kid Catholic (EP) - 2001	2:55
15.	"Happy Birthday to Me (February 15)"	Drunk Kid Catholic (EP) - 2001	3:50
16.	"Motion Sickness"	Motion Sickness (7") - 2000	6:20
Total length:			60:58

Vinyl edition bonus tracks
No.	Title	Original album	Length
17.	"Act of Contrition"	Second Thoughts compilation - 2000
18.	"Hungry for a Holiday"	Album Leaf split (7") - 2001
19.	"When the Curious Girl Realizes She Is Under Glass Again"	Sub Pop Singles Club (7") - 2001
20.	"Entry Way Song"	Amos House Vol. 2 compilation - 2002
21.	"It's Cool, We Can Still Be Friends"	Transmission One: Tea at the Palaz of Hoon compilation - 2000

Japanese edition CD bonus tracks
No.	Title	Original album	Length
17.	"Act of Contrition"	Second Thoughts compilation - 2000	3:32
18.	"It's Cool, We Can Still Be Friends"	Transmission One: Tea at the Palaz of Hoon compilation - 2000	5:34
Total length:			70:04

Noise Floor: A Companion
No.	Title	Length
1.	"Nunca Seré Feliz Otra Vez" (companion version (Note: A Spanish-language version of I Won't Ever Be Happy Again."))	3:39
2.	"The Vanishing Act" (companion version)	3:00
3.	"Soon You Will Be Leaving Your Man" (companion version)	6:04
4.	"Blue Angels Air Show" (companion version)	3:13
5.	"I Will Be Grateful for This Day" (companion version)	4:32
6.	"Motion Sickness" (companion version)	6:28
7.	"I Won't Ever Be Happy Again" (companion version)	3:39
Total length:		30:35

== Charts ==
Chart (2006)	Peak position
US Billboard 200	107
US Independent Albums (Billboard)	6
UK Albums (Official Charts)	155
