= Oh Holy Fools: The Music of Son, Ambulance & Bright Eyes =

EP by Son, Ambulance and Bright Eyes
- Released: January 22, 2001
- Genre: Indie rock; indie pop; emo
- Length: 40:32
- Label: Saddle Creek Records

Son, Ambulance chronology
Oh Holy Fools: The Music of Son, Ambulance & Bright Eyes (2001)	Euphemystic (2001)

Bright Eyes chronology
Don't Be Frightened of Turning the Page (2000)	Oh Holy Fools: The Music of Son, Ambulance & Bright Eyes (2001)	There Is No Beginning to the Story (2002)

Oh Holy Fools: The Music of Son, Ambulance & Bright Eyes is a split EP by Son, Ambulance and Bright Eyes, released in 2001 by Saddle Creek Records. All of the songs by Bright Eyes on the EP can also be found on their EP Don't Be Frightened of Turning the Page.

This album is the 34th release of Saddle Creek Records.

== Track listing ==
Side one
No.	Title	Writer(s)	Artist(s)	Length
1.	"Brown Park"	Joe Knapp	Son, Ambulance	5:47
2.	"Going for the Gold"	Conor Oberst	Bright Eyes	5:07
3.	"The Invention of Beauty"	Joe Knapp	Son, Ambulance	3:32
4.	"Oh, You Are the Roots That Sleep Beneath My Feet and Hold the Earth in Place"	Conor Oberst	Bright Eyes	3:10
5.	"On the Concourse"	Joe Knapp	Son, Ambulance	5:33
6.	"No Lies, Just Love"	Conor Oberst	Bright Eyes	5:58
7.	"Kaite Come True"	Joe Knapp	Son, Ambulance	6:46
8.	"Kathy with a K's Song"	Conor Oberst	Bright Eyes	4:39
Total length:				40:32

== Reception ==
In a review of the EP, Will Hermes of Spin wrote that Son, Amulance's Joe Knapp and Bright Eyes' Conor Oberst combine "their indiepop sensitivity with a passive-aggressiveness even rap-rockers might appreciate", adding: "Oberst shines brightest [...] But the two yin-yang nicely".
