= Don't Be Frightened of Turning the Page =

EP by Bright Eyes
- Released: September 21, 2000
- Genres: Indie folk; folk rock; alternative country
- Length: 24:22
- Labels: Bad News (Japan); 62TV (UK); Les Disques Mange-Tout (UK)

Bright Eyes chronology
Insound Tour Support No.12 (2000)	Don't Be Frightened of Turning the Page (2000)	Oh Holy Fools: The Music of Son, Ambulance & Bright Eyes (2001)

Don't Be Frightened of Turning the Page is an extended play by American indie rock band Bright Eyes released in 2000, exclusively in Japan and the United Kingdom. The tracklist contains the four Bright Eyes songs that appear on their 2001 split EP with Son, Ambulance, Oh Holy Fools: The Music of Son, Ambulance & Bright Eyes, as well as two additional songs.

While the CD is unavailable in most countries, the vinyl record of this album was included in the Bright Eyes Vinyl Box Set.

The track "Mirrors and Fevers" was used as the intro to 2006's rarities compilation, Noise Floor (Rarities: 1998-2005). The track "I Won't Ever Be Happy Again" can also be found on the split EP with Son, Ambulance, Insound Tour Support Series No. 12. However, on this release it is a different, cleaner recording with drums and a full band, whereas the other was a more lo-fi recording with just acoustic guitar and other acoustic instruments, as well as some lyrical changes.

== Track listing ==
No.	Title	Length
1.	"Going for the Gold"	5:06
2.	"Oh, You Are the Roots That Sleep Beneath My Feet and Hold the Earth in Place"	3:10
3.	"I Won't Ever Be Happy Again"	2:37
4.	"No Lies, Just Love"	5:58
5.	"Kathy With a K's Song"	5:28
6.	"Mirrors and Fevers"	2:03
Total length:		24:22
