= Every Day and Every Night =

EP by Bright Eyes
- Released: November 1, 1999
- Genre: Emo; indie rock; lo-fi; folk
- Length: 22:51
- Label: Saddle Creek
- Producer: Mike Mogis

Bright Eyes chronology
Letting Off the Happiness (1998)	Every Day and Every Night (1999)	Fevers and Mirrors (2000)

Professional ratings
Review scores
Source	Rating
AllMusic	4/5 stars
Pitchfork Media	7.2/10
PopMatters	6/10
Spin	(mixed)

Every Day and Every Night is an EP by American indie rock band Bright Eyes. It became the 30th release by Saddle Creek Records on November 1, 1999.

Conor Oberst references this album art in another of his songs, "Waste of Paint", from the album Lifted or The Story Is in the Soil, Keep Your Ear to the Ground. In the first verse he sings (that a friend, most likely Zack Nipper) "Once cut one of my nightmares out of paper; oh I thought it was beautiful, I put it on a record cover...".

== Track listing ==
1. "A Line Allows Progress, a Circle Does Not" – 3:25
2. "A Perfect Sonnet" – 3:41
3. "On My Way to Work" – 4:10
4. "A New Arrangement" – 5:13
5. "Neely O'Hara" – 6:22

== Track information ==
- Neely O'Hara is a character from Valley of the Dolls, written by Jacqueline Susann.

== Personnel ==
- Conor Oberst – guitar, vocals, sampling, keyboards, bass, lyrics
- Eric Bemberger – electric guitar
- Tim Kasher – backing vocals
- Joe Knapp – drums, percussion, vocals
- Matt Maginn – bass
- AJ Mogis – piano, loops, production
- Mike Mogis – organ, pedal steel, vibraphone, keyboards, percussion, production
- Angelina Mullikin – violin

== Charts ==
Chart (2012)	Peak position
US Vinyl Albums (Billboard)	8
