= Lover I Don't Have to Love =

Single by Bright Eyes

from the album Lifted or The Story Is in the Soil, Keep Your Ear to the Ground
- Released: 2002
- Recorded: 2002
- Genre: Emo
- Length: 4:00
- Label: Saddle Creek
- Songwriter(s): Conor Oberst

Bright Eyes singles chronology
"I Will Be Grateful for This Day, I Will Be Grateful for Each Day to Come" (2001)	"Lover I Don't Have to Love" (2002)	"Lua" (2004)

"Lover I Don't Have to Love" is a song by Bright Eyes released as a single in 2002 and released on the album Lifted or The Story Is in the Soil, Keep Your Ear to the Ground.

The music video is karaoke with sing-along lyrics and different ambiences in the background.

It was covered by Bettie Serveert on their 2004 album Attagirl, and this cover was played extensively during the episode "The Undertow" of The O.C.

The line "I asked your name, you asked the time" is a reference to the novel The Catcher in the Rye by J.D. Salinger. The single's cover photograph by Casey Scott.

== Track listing ==
1. "Lover I Don't Have to Love"
2. "Amy in the White Coat"
3. "Out on the Weekend" (Live) (Neil Young cover)

The CD single has the title "3 More Hit Songs from Bright Eyes."
