= Home Volume IV =

Home Volume IV: Bright Eyes & Britt Daniel

EP by Bright Eyes & Britt Daniel
- Released: September 17, 2002
- Recorded: April 12–15, 2002
- Genre: Indie rock
- Length: 13:31
- Label: Post-Parlo
- Producer: "All those involved"

Original Cover
- Two thousand limited copies were released with the white cover before the '04 re-issue with the burgundy cover.

Professional ratings
Review scores
Source	Rating
Pitchfork Media	(7.9/10)

Home Volume IV: Bright Eyes & Britt Daniel is a collaborative split EP by Bright Eyes and Britt Daniel (of the band Spoon) and is volume four of Post-Parlo Records' Home Series. It was originally limited to 2000 copies in a white, home-made, hand-numbered cardboard package, but was re-issued in 2004 (in a standard plastic case with a burgundy inlay) due to the sudden rise in popularity of the musicians involved.

== Track listing ==
1. "Spent on Rainy Days" (Conor Oberst) (2:07)
2. "You Get Yours" (Britt Daniel) (3:11)
3. "Southern State" (Oberst) (4:49)
4. "Let the Distance Bring Us Together" (Daniel) (3:24)

== Personnel ==
- Britt Daniel - guitar, tambourine, bass, vocals
- Conor Oberst - alarm clock, bass, guitar, vocals
- Stephen Pedersen - "Atari" guitar
- Mike Sweeney - drums
