= Letting Off the Happiness =

Studio album by Bright Eyes
- Released: November 2, 1998
- Recorded: March 1997 – March 1998
- Studio: Conor Oberst's basement, Omaha, Nebraska; Chase Park Transduction, Athens, Georgia
- Genre: Lo-fi; alternative country; rock; emo; electroacoustic
- Length: 57:02
- Label: Saddle Creek
- Producer: Mike Mogis

Bright Eyes chronology
A Collection of Songs Written and Recorded 1995–1997 (1998)	Letting Off the Happiness (1998)	Every Day and Every Night (1999)

Singles from Letting Off the Happiness: A Companion
- 1. "Contrast and Compare (Companion version)" Released: February 1, 2022; 2. "St. Ides Heaven (Companion version)" Released: March 22, 2022

Professional ratings
Review scores
Source	Rating
AllMusic	4.5/5 stars
NME	8/10
Pitchfork	6.8/10
The Rolling Stone Album Guide	3.5/5 stars

Letting Off the Happiness is the second studio album released by the indie rock band Bright Eyes. The album was released on November 2, 1998. It was the first release by Bright Eyes to feature and be produced by Mike Mogis, now a permanent member of the band. A vinyl re-release of the album was included in the Bright Eyes Vinyl Box Set in 2012. Guest musicians include members of Cursive, Tilly and the Wall, and Elephant 6 collective's Neutral Milk Hotel and of Montreal.

This album is the 23rd release of Saddle Creek Records. The album was reissued alongside a six-track companion EP by Dead Oceans on May 27, 2022.

== Track listing ==
All tracks are written by Conor Oberst.

Letting Off the Happiness track listing
No.	Title	Length
1.	"If Winter Ends"	3:25
2.	"Padraic My Prince"	3:48
3.	"Contrast and Compare"	3:57
4.	"The City Has Sex"	2:11
5.	"The Difference in the Shades"	4:23
6.	"Touch"	3:42
7.	"June on the West Coast"	3:34
8.	"Pull My Hair"	4:10
9.	"A Poetic Retelling of an Unfortunate Seduction"	4:24
10.	"Tereza and Tomas" (ends at 5:42, followed by guitar drone. "Contrast and Compare (Version)" (4:48) begins at 20:58.)	25:46

Japanese edition
No.	Title	Length
1.	"If Winter Ends"	3:25
2.	"Padraic My Prince"	3:48
3.	"Contrast and Compare"	3:57
4.	"The City Has Sex"	2:11
5.	"The Difference in the Shades"	4:23
6.	"Touch"	3:42
7.	"June on the West Coast"	3:34
8.	"Pull My Hair"	4:10
9.	"Empty Canyon, Empty Canteen"	2:46
10.	"A Poetic Retelling of an Unfortunate Seduction"	4:24
11.	"Tereza and Tomas"	25:46

Letting Off the Happiness: A Companion track listing
No.	Title	Length
1.	"The Difference in the Shades" (companion version; featuring Miwi La Lupa)	4:25
2.	"The City Has Sex" (companion version; featuring Waxahatchee)	2:27
3.	"Contrast and Compare" (companion version; featuring Waxahatchee)	3:16
4.	"Kathy With a K's Song" (companion version; with M. Ward)	4:54
5.	"St. Ides Heaven" (featuring Phoebe Bridgers; written by Elliott Smith)	2:40
6.	"June on the West Coast" (companion version; featuring Becky Stark)	3:38
Total length:		22:00

== Personnel ==
- Conor Oberst – vocals; guitar (1–5, 7–10); acoustic drums, electric drums (3); keyboards (6); piano (10)
- Mike Mogis – atmospheric noises (2); pedal steel (3, 5, 8, 9); melodica, air organ (3); country guitar (4); keyboards (4, 6, 9); electric drums (8); organs (9); piano, bowed chimes (10); recording (2, 3, 10); mixing, mastering
- Matt Maginn – bass (2)
- Matt Focht – drums (2); percussion (10)
- Matt Oberst – guitar (3)
- Neely Jenkins – vocals (3, 8)
- Andy LeMaster – vocals (4, 8); percussion (4); bass (5); lead guitar (8); recording, engineering (4, 5, 6, 9)
- Jeremy Barnes – drums (4, 5, 6, 9); percussion (4); broken keyboards (6); accordion (9)
- Kevin Barnes – Rhodes keyboard (5); angelic background vocals (9)
- Ted Stevens – sloppy drums (8)
- Aaron Druery – ebow bass (10)
- Robb Nansel – finger cymbals (10)

== Charts ==
Chart performance for Letting Off the Happiness
Chart (2012)	Peak position
US Vinyl Albums (Billboard)	4

Chart performance for Letting Off the Happiness: A Companion
Chart (2022)	Peak position
US Top Album Sales (Billboard)	92
