= A Collection of Songs Written and Recorded 1995–1997 =

Studio album by Bright Eyes
- Released: January 20, 1998 (US)
- Recorded: 1995–1997
- Genre: Indie rock; lo-fi; emo
- Length: 67:13
- Label: Saddle Creek

Bright Eyes chronology
Bright Eyes / Squad Car 96 (1997)	A Collection of Songs Written and Recorded 1995–1997 (1998)	Letting Off the Happiness (1998)

Singles from A Collection of Songs Written and Recorded 1995–1997: A Companion
- 1. "Falling Out of Love at This Volume (Companion version)" Released: February 1, 2022

Professional ratings
Review scores
Source	Rating
AllMusic	2.5/5 stars

A Collection of Songs Written and Recorded 1995–1997 is the debut studio album by Bright Eyes. The album is the first commercial release by Conor Oberst and features his vocals and guitar. This album is the 19th release of Saddle Creek Records. The album was reissued alongside a six-track companion EP by Dead Oceans on May 27, 2022.

== Track listing ==
A Collection of Songs Written and Recorded 1995–1997 track listing
No.	Title	Length
1.	"The Invisible Gardener"	2:24
2.	"Patient Hope in New Snow"	4:07
3.	"Saturday as Usual"	3:38
4.	"Falling Out of Love at This Volume"	2:17
5.	"Exaltation on a Cool Kitchen Floor"	2:26
6.	"The Awful Sweetness of Escaping Sweat"	4:05
7.	"Puella Quam Amo Est Pulchra"	3:11
8.	"Driving Fast Through a Big City at Night"	2:11
9.	"How Many Lights Do You See?"	3:31
10.	"I Watched You Taking Off"	3:57
11.	"A Celebration Upon Completion"	4:15
12.	"Emily, Sing Something Sweet"	3:01
13.	"All of the Truth"	3:44
14.	"One Straw (Please)"	2:49
15.	"Lila"	2:51
16.	"A Few Minutes on Friday"	4:08
17.	"Supriya"	2:29
18.	"Solid Jackson"	4:31
19.	"Feb. 15th"	4:06
20.	"The 'Feel Good' Revolution"	3:31

A Collection of Songs Written and Recorded 1995–1997: A Companion
No.	Title	Length
1.	"Driving Fast Through a Big City at Night" (companion version)	3:19
2.	"Solid Jackson" (companion version)	4:01
3.	"A Celebration Upon Completion" (companion version)	3:53
4.	"Falling Out of Love at This Volume" (companion version) (featuring Miwi La Lupa)	2:22
5.	"Exaltation on a Cool Kitchen Floor" (companion version)	1:59
6.	"Double Joe" (Simon Joyner)	3:13
Total length:		18:47

== Personnel ==
- Conor Oberst – writing, singing, strumming, keyboards, low rhythm, drumming, sounds
- Ted Stevens – drumming on "The Awful Sweetness of Escaping Sweat"
- Todd Fink – sounds and drumming on "I Watched You Taking Off"
- Matt Bowen – left-handed drumming on "One Straw (Please)"
- Neely Jenkins – backup singing on "Feb. 15th"
- Matthew Oberst, Sr. – lead strumming on "The 'Feel Good' Revolution"

== Charts ==
2012 chart positions for A Collection of Songs Written and Recorded 1995–1997
Chart (2012)	Peak position
US Vinyl Albums (Billboard)	15

2022 chart positions for A Collection of Songs Written and Recorded 1995–1997
Chart (2022)	Peak position
UK Independent Albums (OCC)	48
US Top Album Sales (Billboard)	96
