= Fevers and Mirrors =

Studio album by Bright Eyes
- Released: May 29, 2000
- Recorded: 1999
- Studio: Presto!, Lincoln, Nebraska
- Genre: Lo-fi; alternative country; Britpop; chamber pop; indie folk
- Length: 55:10
- Label: Saddle Creek
- Producer: Mike Mogis

Bright Eyes chronology
Every Day and Every Night (1999)	Fevers and Mirrors (2000)	Insound Tour Support No.12 (2000)

Singles from Fevers and Mirrors: A Companion
- 1. "Haligh, Haligh, A Lie, Haligh (Companion version)" Released: February 1, 2022

Fevers and Mirrors is the third studio album by American indie band Bright Eyes, recorded in 1999 and released on May 29, 2000. It was the 32nd release of the Omaha, Nebraska-based record label Saddle Creek Records. The album was released later in 2000 in the United Kingdom as the inaugural release from Wichita Recordings.

The album begins with a recording of a little boy reading Mitchell Is Moving, a book by Marjorie Weinman Sharmat. "An Attempt to Tip the Scales" includes what is ostensibly an interview with the band's frontman, Conor Oberst. However, Oberst has admitted that the interview was something of a joke, intended to poke fun at the dark tone of the album. Conor's voice is impersonated in the interview by Todd Fink of the Faint and Commander Venus. The man interviewing is Matt Silcock, a former member of Lullaby for the Working Class.

The album was reissued alongside a six-track companion EP by Dead Oceans on May 27, 2022.

== Critical reception ==
Professional ratings
Review scores
Source	Rating
AllMusic	4.5/5 stars
Melody Maker	3.5/5 stars
NME	7/10
Pitchfork	5.4/10 (2000); 9.0/10 (2012)
The Rolling Stone Album Guide	3.5/5 stars
Under the Radar	9/10

The music online magazine Pitchfork placed Fevers and Mirrors at number 170 on its list of top 200 albums of the 2000s, despite a low initial score of 5.4/10. In 2012, Pitchfork's Ian Cohen gave the reissued version of the album a 9.0 out of 10.

== Track listing ==
No.	Title	Length
1.	"A Spindle, a Darkness, a Fever, and a Necklace"	6:28
2.	"A Scale, a Mirror and Those Indifferent Clocks"	2:44
3.	"The Calendar Hung Itself..."	3:55
4.	"Something Vague"	3:33
5.	"The Movement of a Hand"	4:02
6.	"Arienette"	3:45
7.	"When the Curious Girl Realizes She Is Under Glass"	2:40
8.	"Haligh, Haligh, a Lie, Haligh"	4:43
9.	"The Center of the World"	4:43
10.	"Sunrise, Sunset"	4:32
11.	"An Attempt to Tip the Scales"	8:29
12.	"A Song to Pass the Time"	5:30
Total length:		55:10

Japanese edition track listing
No.	Title	Length
1.	"A Spindle, a Darkness, a Fever, and a Necklace"	6:28
2.	"A Scale, a Mirror, and Those Indifferent Clocks"	2:44
3.	"The Calendar Hung Itself..."	3:55
4.	"Something Vague"	3:33
5.	"The Joy in Discovery"	1:06
6.	"The Movement of a Hand"	4:02
7.	"When the Curious Girl Realizes She Is Under Glass"	2:40
8.	"Arienette"	3:45
9.	"Jetsabel Removes the Undesirables"	6:09
10.	"Haligh, Haligh, a Lie, Haligh"	4:43
11.	"The Center of the World"	4:43
12.	"Sunrise, Sunset"	4:32
13.	"An Attempt to Tip the Scales"	8:29
14.	"A Song to Pass the Time"	5:30
Total length:		62:51

Vinyl box set track listing
No.	Title	Length
1.	"A Spindle, a Darkness, a Fever, and a Necklace"	6:28
2.	"A Scale, a Mirror, and Those Indifferent Clocks"	2:44
3.	"The Calendar Hung Itself..."	3:55
4.	"Something Vague"	3:33
5.	"The Joy in Discovery"	1:06
6.	"The Movement of a Hand"	4:02
7.	"Arienette"	3:45
8.	"When the Curious Girl Realizes She Is Under Glass"	2:40
9.	"Haligh, Haligh, a Lie, Haligh"	4:43
10.	"The Center of the World"	4:43
11.	"Jetsabel Removes the Undesirables"	6:09
12.	"Sunrise, Sunset"	4:32
13.	"An Attempt to Tip the Scales"	8:29
14.	"A Song to Pass the Time"	5:30
Total length:		62:51

Fevers and Mirrors: A companion
No.	Title	Length
1.	"Haligh, Haligh, a Lie, Haligh" (companion version) (featuring Phoebe Bridgers)	4:38
2.	"A Scale, a Mirror, and Those Indifferent Clocks" (companion version) (featuring Phoebe Bridgers)	3:01
3.	"Arienette" (companion version)	3:47
4.	"Hypnotist (Song for Daniel H)" (Lullaby for the Working Class)	3:21
5.	"When the Curious Girl Realizes She Is Under Glass" (companion version) (featuring Phoebe Bridgers)	2:49
6.	"A Spindle, a Darkness, a Fever, and a Necklace" (companion version) (featuring Phoebe Bridgers)	4:46
Total length:		22:22

== Personnel ==
- Conor Oberst – vocals, guitar (1, 4, 6, 8, 10–12), sample (1), organs (2), Rhodes (5), keyboards (5, 12), piano (6, 7), tremolo guitar (9), percussion (11), toy piano (12)
- Mike Mogis – electric guitar (4, 9), pedal steel (6, 8), vibraphone (1, 8), tambourine (6, 8), glockenspiel (1), piano (1), Ebow pedal steel (2), electronics (2, 9), tongue drum (3), guiro (3), lap dulcimer (4), hammered dulcimer (5), atmosphere (7), acoustic guitar intro (9), organ (9), mandolin (10), keyboards (10), samples (11), percussion (11)
- Todd Baechle – keyboards (3)
- Tim Kasher – accordion (1, 4, 6)
- Joe Knapp – drums (3, 4, 6, 8, 9), percussion (3), vocals (8)
- Jiha Lee – flute (2, 4, 10), vocals (5)
- Andy LeMaster – guitar (3), percussion (3, 6, 11), Mellotron (5, 6), bass (2, 5, 10), electric guitar (9), vocals (9–11), keyboards (11)
- Matt Maginn – bass (3, 4, 6, 8, 9)
- A.J. Mogis – piano (2), Rhodes (9)
- Clint Schnase – drums (2, 5, 10)

== Charts ==
Chart positions for Fevers and Mirrors
Chart (2012)	Peak position
US Vinyl Albums (Billboard)	7

Chart positions for Fevers and Mirrors: A Companion
Chart (2022)	Peak position
UK Independent Albums (OCC)	43
US Top Album Sales (Billboard)	54
