= Four Winds (EP) =

EP by Bright Eyes
- Released: March 6, 2007
- Recorded: 2006
- Genre: Indie rock; indie folk; alternative country
- Length: 27:38
- Label: Saddle Creek
- Producer: Mike Mogis

Bright Eyes chronology
Noise Floor (Rarities: 1998–2005) (2006)	Four Winds (2007)	Cassadaga (2007)

Four Winds is an EP by the indie rock band Bright Eyes, that was released on March 6, 2007. The title track is the first single from their album Cassadaga. The other 5 tracks are exclusive b-sides from the 2006 recording sessions. It is marketed as being "quietly enchanting" and including "a wandering country charm and all of the story-telling seductiveness of earlier work. The song "Four Winds" was ranked #5 on Rolling Stone's list of the 100 Best Songs of 2007.

The title song makes several references to "The Second Coming" by William Butler Yeats, particularly in the refrain, which references "slouching towards Bethlehem."

== Music video ==
The music video for "Four Winds" shows the band playing at a state fair for a rowdy crowd. It includes Oberst on vocals and lead guitar, Mike Mogis on second guitar, Nate Walcott on organ, Anton Patzner on fiddle, Daniel J. McCarthy on bass, and Maria Taylor on drums. Although audibly present on the recordings, there is no mandolinist on stage. As the song progresses, the band is increasingly booed off the stage, and objects are thrown at the stage.

Directed by Patrick Daughters, the video was filmed in a large tent in Los Angeles' Elysian Park in early February. Several days before filming, a notice was sent to Bright Eyes fans in the area inviting them to participate in the video as extras. Several extras were chosen to shout obscenities at the band, many of which are heard directly in the video. The audience was given a variety of objects to throw at the band, such as popcorn, hot dogs, glowsticks, fuzzy dice, cups, and licorice. Many of the objects hit the band members during filming, but no one was harmed during the course of the afternoon.

Upon the filming's conclusion, Oberst noted that one particular heckler had frightened him "all evening." To make amends, Oberst invited the heckler onstage for a hug.

== Artwork ==
The cover of the Four Winds EP seems to be full of religious and mythical references. The words IEOVA, EHEIIE, ELIION, and ELOA are Hebrew names "of supreme importance in the list of the Sephiroth and their sovereign equivalents." They are used in conjuring spells in "The Key of Solomon", the "most famous and important of all Grimoires, or handbooks of Magic." The Key of Solomon seems to focus a lot on planetary invocation and alignment.

From Book 1, Chapter 1 of The Key of Solomon:

Solomon, the son of David, King of Israel, hath said that the beginning of our Key is to fear God, to adore him, to honour him with contrition of heart, to invoke him in all matters which we wish to undertake, and to operate with very great devotion, for thus God will lead us in the right way. When, therefore, thou shalt wish to acquire the knowledge of magical arts and sciences, it is necessary to have prepared the order of hours and of days, and of the position of the Moon, without the operation of which thou canst effect nothing; but if thou observest them with diligence thou mayest easily and thoroughly arrive at the effect and end which thou desirest to attain.

The square in the background with seemingly random letters, is one of a series of squares that represent "the shining ones", 7 Gods of Olympus that each rule their own day of the week and planet. This particular square is called "The Square of Blumaza" and it represents "Monday" and "The Moon". Each God has power over certain desires. In this case, the Olympic for Monday and the Moon is Artemis and the desires that she rules are "virginity/fertility, and the hunt" as well as anything related to air.

The words on the inside front and rear cover are Hebrew names used as inscriptions on "The Brazen Vessel" which is "a brass vessel with an inscription around it to raise it from a mundane object into a Magikal tool."

== Critical reception ==
Professional ratings
Review scores
Source	Rating
AllMusic	3/5 stars
Pitchfork	5.9/10

The EP received mixed reviews in various publications. Stephen Deusner of Pitchfork liked the title track, commenting that the formula used that made the previous double album I'm Wide Awake, It's Morning/Digital Ash in a Digital Urn so popular worked even better. He continued by saying that "not many other singers today - maybe Win Butler, could get away with so many mentions of both the Whore of Babylon and the Great Satan in one song", and that ""Four Winds" is the rare protest song that actually tries to present an epic vision of America and succeeds". However, Deusner lamented the remaining tracks "pulling it in different directions, but nothing else hits the mark so squarely-- or really at all.", and the progressive "shaky" songwriting and general scope. Overall, he rated the release 5.9/10.

== Track listing ==
All songs written by Conor Oberst, except where noted.

All songs were produced by Mike Mogis.

No.	Title	Writer(s)	Length
1.	"Four Winds"		4:16
2.	"Reinvent the Wheel"		3:32
3.	"Smoke Without Fire"	Oberst; M. Ward	5:00
4.	"Stray Dog Freedom" (featuring Ben Kweller)		5:14
5.	"Cartoon Blues"		3:54
6.	"Tourist Trap"		5:44

== The Killers cover ==
In 2009, Las Vegas rock band the Killers recorded a cover version of "Four Winds," which was released as a B-side to "Spaceman", the second single from their third studio album, Day & Age.

== Personnel ==
Bright Eyes

- Conor Oberst – vocals, guitar
- Mike Mogis – guitar, mandolin, banjo, bass, half guitar, lap steel, castanets, dobro
- Nate Walcott – organ, wurlitzer, piano, flugelhorn

Additional personnel

- M. Ward – guitar, harmonica, baritone, vocals
- Dan McCarthy – bass
- Jason Boesel – drums
- Anton Patzner – violin
- Maria Taylor – vocals, drums
- Andy LeMaster – vocals
- Janet Weiss – drums, vocals
- Stacy DuPree – vocals
- Sherri DuPree – vocals
- Z Berg – vocals
- Rachael Yamagata – vocals
- Mike Coykendall – autoharp, percussive guitar
- Ben Kweller – piano, vocals
- David Rawlings – guitar
- Tim Luntzel – bass
- Rob Hawkins – vocals
- Barney Crawford – vocals

== Charts ==
Chart (2007)	Peak position
US Billboard 200	57
US Independent Albums (Billboard)	5
US Top Rock Albums (Billboard)	20
