= Motion Sickness (album) =

Live album by Bright Eyes
- Released: November 15, 2005
- Recorded: 2005
- Genres: Lo-fi; country rock
- Length: 61:32
- Labels: Team Love (US); Saddle Creek (Europe)

Bright Eyes chronology
Digital Ash in a Digital Urn (2005)	Motion Sickness (2005)	Noise Floor (Rarities: 1998–2005) (2006)

Professional ratings
Aggregate scores
Source	Rating
Metacritic	74/100
Review scores
Source	Rating
Blender	4/5 stars
Pitchfork	7.0/10

Motion Sickness: Live Recordings is a live album by Bright Eyes. Documenting the I'm Wide Awake, It's Morning tours from the first half of 2005, Motion Sickness is a compilation of live tracks, including covers of Feist and Elliott Smith. It comes with a 24-page booklet featuring an extensive tour diary written by Jason Boesel (Bright Eyes live band/Rilo Kiley).

This album is the sixth release of Team Love Records.

== Track listing ==
All songs written by Conor Oberst unless otherwise noted.

1. "At the Bottom of Everything" – 3:44
2. "We Are Nowhere and It's Now" – 4:01
3. "Old Soul Song (For the New World Order)" – 4:07
4. "Make War (Short Version)" – 0:43
5. "Make War" – 5:41
6. "A Scale, a Mirror and Those Indifferent Clocks" – 2:22
7. "Landlocked Blues" – 5:51
8. "Method Acting" – 3:41
9. "Train Under Water" – 5:59
10. "When the President Talks to God" – 3:27
11. "Road to Joy" – 5:56
12. "Mushaboom" (Leslie Feist) – 2:44
13. "True Blue" – 5:41
14. "Southern State" – 4:40
15. "The Biggest Lie" (Elliott Smith) – 2:48

== Personnel ==
- Stefanie Drootin – bass
- Nate Walcott – trumpet, Wurlitzer, organ
- Mike Mogis – mandolin, pedal steel, electric guitar, resophonic guitar, tambourine
- Alex McManus – guitar, back-up singer
- Conor Oberst – lead singer, guitar, wurlitzer, organ
- Jason Boesel – drums
- Nick White – Wurlitzer, organ
- Jesse Harris - guitar (track 15)
- Jacob Feinberg - Recording and Mix engineer
