= Cassadaga (album) =

Studio album by Bright Eyes
- Released: April 9, 2007
- Recorded: 2006
- Studios: New York City; Portland, Oregon; and Lincoln, Nebraska
- Genres: Indie rock; indie folk; alternative country
- Length: 62:05
- Label: Saddle Creek
- Producer: Mike Mogis

Bright Eyes chronology
Four Winds (2007)	Cassadaga (2007)	The People's Key (2011)

Singles from Cassadaga
- 1. "Four Winds" Released: March 6, 2007; 2. "Hot Knives" / "If the Brakeman Turns My Way" Released: July 9, 2007

Singles from Cassadaga: A Companion
- 1. "Middleman (Companion version)" Released: May 9, 2023

Professional ratings
Aggregate scores
Source	Rating
Metacritic	78/100
Review scores
Source	Rating
AllMusic	4/5 stars
The A.V. Club	B−
Entertainment Weekly	B+
The Guardian	4/5 stars
Los Angeles Times	4/4 stars
MSN Music (Consumer Guide)	A−
NME	8/10
Pitchfork	6.0/10
Rolling Stone	4/5 stars
Spin	4/5 stars

Cassadaga is the eighth studio album by Bright Eyes, released in the UK on April 9, 2007, and in the US on April 10. Around 25 to 30 songs were recorded in 2006, with 13 of these appearing on the final track list. The album is named after the town of Cassadaga, Florida. Z Berg of the Like, Sherri DuPree and Stacy King of Eisley, and singer-songwriter Rachael Yamagata all appear on this album. The first single, "Four Winds", was released on March 6, 2007, taken from the Four Winds EP, which contains five B-sides not on Cassadaga.

Cassadaga debuted at number four on the Billboard 200, becoming the band's highest-charting album in the US, and sold about 58,000 copies in its first week. It went on to sell over 231,000 units in US. The album is the 103rd release of Saddle Creek Records. This album was number 12 on Rolling Stone's list of the Top 50 Albums of 2007. Cassadaga reached number 13 on the UK Albums Chart in April 2007.

The first single from the album, "Four Winds", can be heard in the background briefly during the party scene in the 2008 film Cloverfield.

The album was reissued by Dead Oceans alongside a six-track companion EP on June 16, 2023.

== Cover ==
The CD and LP versions of the album come with a "spectral decoder" which allows users to see the true cover art on the album. One particular segment of text located on the back of the case includes a phrase in Russian: "тяните другую кровавую ванну", "draw another bloody bath", a reference to the first track's lyrics. Another hidden phrase is in (incorrect) Greek: "παρελθόν παρουσιάζω μέλλον", "the past presents the future", which is also the title of an album by Her Space Holiday, with whom Bright Eyes released a split single.

Hidden phrases in English:

- "Dog-faced apologists pleasing themselves on the burning sand"
- "These myths are sacred and profane!"
- "Rocks beneath the water" (the meaning of "Cassadaga" in the Seneca language)
- "Citrus slaves throwing dice in the dirt, amusement"
- "We love you, Breezy, and we miss you!!!" (Breezy was the nickname of Sabrina Duim)
- "Swollen saints bathing in a backwards river under a sliver of a moon"
- "Mighty Saturn enters your eighth house"

Hidden phrases in French:

- "Est-ce minuit ou midi?" ("Is it midnight or noon?")

Hidden phrases in Portuguese:

- "Virgens doentes de sol ficando frescas no túmulo do faraó" ("Virgins sick from the sun staying fresh in the grave of the Pharaoh")
- "Plantas de pirâmedes cheio de cores tatuado na barriga de uma puta" ("Pyramid blueprints, full of colours, tattooed on the belly of a whore")

"For Sabrina" is written on the inside of the CD case, and a separate insert on the LP, in memory of Sabrina Duim, a harpist and Stanford University undergraduate who toured with Bright Eyes and died in January 2007.

On the back of the UK standard edition, "If the Brakeman Turns My Way" is converted to the British spelling of "If the Breakman Turns My Way". This UK standard edition was modified by designers at Polydor/Universal from the U.S. release (digipak, equivalent to the UK deluxe version).

On February 10, 2008, Cassadaga won a Grammy award for Best Recording Package.

== Track listing ==
All songs written by Conor Oberst, except where noted.

No.	Title	Writer(s)	Length
1.	"Clairaudients (Kill or Be Killed)"		6:05
2.	"Four Winds"		4:16
3.	"If the Brakeman Turns My Way"	Conor Oberst and Jason Boesel	4:53
4.	"Hot Knives"		4:13
5.	"Make a Plan to Love Me"		4:14
6.	"Soul Singer in a Session Band"		4:14
7.	"Classic Cars"		4:19
8.	"Middleman"		4:49
9.	"Cleanse Song"		3:28
10.	"No One Would Riot for Less"		5:12
11.	"Coat Check Dream Song"	Conor Oberst and Nate Walcott	4:10
12.	"I Must Belong Somewhere"		6:19
13.	"Lime Tree"		5:53

Cassadaga: A Companion

1. "Clairaudients (Kill or Be Killed)" (companion version) – 2:48
2. "Middleman" (companion version) – 4:39
3. "Coat Check Dream Song" (companion version) – 4:42
4. "I Must Belong Somewhere" (companion version) – 4:45
5. "Napoleon's Hat" (companion version) – 5:42
6. "Wrecking Ball" (David Rawlings and Gillian Welch) – 5:19

=== B-sides ===
B-side	Availability
"Tourist Trap"	Four Winds
"Reinvent the Wheel"	Four Winds
"Cartoon Blues"	Four Winds
"Smoke Without Fire"	Four Winds
"Stray Dog Freedom"	Four Winds
"Endless Entertainment"	Download here
"Susan Miller Rag"	3" (8 cm) with Cassadaga pre-order

"Susan Miller Rag" is a B-side to the album. The song was released on CD and vinyl formats, and was only available to customers who pre-ordered Cassadaga.

== Personnel ==
- Conor Oberst – voice (1–13), guitar (tracks 1, 2, 4–10, 12, 13), piano (track 3), synthesizer (track 13)
- Mike Mogis – guitar (tracks 2, 4, 5, 7, 9, 11), bass (tracks 1, 3–6, 9), pedal steel (tracks 1, 3, 10, 11), voice (tracks 3, 9, 11), lap steel (tracks 6, 8, 9), mandolin (tracks 2, 12), dobro (tracks 4, 12), percussion (tracks 8, 9), vibraphone (tracks 1, 11), 12-string (track 2), baritone (track 8), ukulele (track 9), glockenspiel (track 1)
- Nate Walcott – organ (1–3, 6, 7, 10, 12), piano (tracks 4, 6, 7), string arrangement (tracks 4, 10, 13), electric piano (tracks 2, 11), orchestral arrangement (tracks 1, 5), woodwind arrangement (tracks 8, 9)
- M. Ward – guitar (tracks 1, 4, 6), voice (track 6)
- Janet Weiss – drums (tracks 1, 4, 6)
- Clark Baechle – percussion (track 1)
- Stacy DuPree – voice (tracks 4, 5, 10, 11, 13)
- Sherri DuPree – voice (tracks 4, 5, 10, 11, 13)
- Z Berg – voice (tracks 1, 4, 5, 10, 11, 13)
- Rachael Yamagata – voice (tracks 1, 4, 5, 10, 11, 13)
- Hassan Lemtouni – voice (tracks 1, 11)
- Chris MacDonald – voice (track 5, 8)
- Suzie Katayama – conductor (tracks 1, 5)
- Bill Meyers – conductor (tracks 4, 10, 13)
- Dan McCarthy – bass (track 2)
- Jason Boesel – drums (tracks 2, 3, 7, 10–12), voice (tracks 3, 8)
- Anton Patzner – violin (tracks 2, 6)
- Maria Taylor – voice (track 2), drums (track 5)
- Andy LeMaster – voice (track 2)
- David Rawlings – guitar (tracks 5, 7, 12)
- Tim Luntzel – bass (tracks 7, 10)
- Gillian Welch – voice (track 7)
- Ted Stevens – voice (track 8)
- Sean Foley – voice (track 8)
- John McEntire – percussion (tracks 8, 9, 11), electronics (track 11)
- Michael Zerang – percussion (tracks 8, 9)
- Jonathan Crawford – percussion (tracks 8, 9, 11)
- Dan Bitney – percussion (tracks 8, 9)
- Dan Fliegel – percussion (tracks 8, 9)
- David Moyer – bass clarinet (track 8)
- Brian Walsh – clarinet (track 9), bass clarinet (track 8)
- Shane Aspegren – drums (track 11), percussion (track 9)
- Sarah Wass – flute (track 9)
- Myka Miller – oboe (track 9)
- Stefanie Drootin – bass (tracks 11, 12)
- Jake Bellows – voice (track 12)

== Charts ==
Chart performance for Cassadaga
Chart (2007)	Peak position
Australian Albums (ARIA)	40
Austrian Albums (Ö3 Austria)	47
Belgian Albums (Ultratop Flanders)	25
Belgian Alternative Albums (Ultratop Flanders)	18
Canadian Albums (Nielsen SoundScan)	19
Danish Albums (Hitlisten)	39
Dutch Albums (Album Top 100)	36
Dutch Alternative Albums (Alternative Top 30)	1
European Albums (Billboard)	18
German Albums (Offizielle Top 100)	19
Irish Albums (IRMA)	35
New Zealand Heatseekers Albums (RIANZ)	2
Norwegian Albums (VG-lista)	9
Scottish Albums (Official Charts)	11
Swedish Albums (Sverigetopplistan)	33
Swiss Albums (Schweizer Hitparade)	59
UK Albums (Official Charts)	13
US Billboard 200	4
US Independent Albums (Billboard)	1
US Indie Store Album Sales (Billboard)	1
US Top Rock Albums (Billboard)	1
