= Lifted or The Story Is in the Soil, Keep Your Ear to the Ground =

Studio album by Bright Eyes
- Released: August 13, 2002
- Recorded: December 2001 – January 2002
- Studios: Presto!, Lincoln, Nebraska
- Genres: Indie folk; country rock; alternative country; emo; chamber pop
- Length: 73:08
- Label: Saddle Creek
- Producer: Mike Mogis

Bright Eyes chronology
There Is No Beginning to the Story (2002)	Lifted or The Story Is in the Soil, Keep Your Ear to the Ground (2002)	A Christmas Album (2002)

Singles from Lifted or The Story Is in the Soil, Keep Your Ear to the Ground
- 1. "Lover I Don't Have to Love" Released: 2002

Singles from Lifted or The Story Is in the Soil, Keep Your Ear to the Ground: A Companion
- 1. "You Will. You? Will. You? Will. You? Will. (Companion version)" Released: August 10, 2022

Lifted or The Story Is in the Soil, Keep Your Ear to the Ground is the fourth studio album by Bright Eyes and the 46th release of Saddle Creek Records. The band made its national television debut in support of the album, performing "The Trees Get Wheeled Away" (a track that was not on the album) on the Late Show with David Letterman.

The album was reissued by Dead Oceans alongside a six-track companion EP on November 11, 2022.

== Critical reception ==
Professional ratings
Aggregate scores
Source	Rating
Metacritic	77/100
Review scores
Source	Rating
AllMusic	4.5/5 stars
Blender	4/5 stars
The Guardian	4/5 stars
Los Angeles Times	4/4 stars
NME	7/10
Pitchfork	7.7/10
Q	4/5 stars
The Rolling Stone Album Guide	4.5/5 stars
Spin	8/10
The Village Voice	B+

Lifted received positive reviews, ranking fourth on Rolling Stone's list of the best albums in 2002, and was lauded as a breakthrough album for Bright Eyes and Conor Oberst. Kludge included it on their list of best albums of 2002. Blender ranked the album at 52 on their list of "100 Greatest Indie-Rock Albums Ever", which appeared in the December 2007 issue.

Lifted was the band's first to reach The Billboard 200, spending one week at No. 161. The set has sold 184,000 copies in the United States, according to Nielsen SoundScan. As of 2009 it has sold over 340,000 copies in the US.

== Track listing ==
No.	Title	Length
1.	"The Big Picture"	8:42
2.	"Method Acting"	3:42
3.	"False Advertising"	5:52
4.	"You Will. You? Will. You? Will. You? Will."	3:25
5.	"Lover I Don't Have to Love"	4:00
6.	"Bowl of Oranges"	4:48
7.	"Don't Know When But a Day Is Gonna Come"	6:31
8.	"Nothing Gets Crossed Out"	4:34
9.	"Make War"	6:16
10.	"Waste of Paint"	6:29
11.	"From a Balance Beam"	3:40
12.	"Laura Laurent"	4:56
13.	"Let's Not Shit Ourselves (To Love and to Be Loved)"	10:07
Total length:		73:08

Lifted or the Story Is in the Soil, Keep Your Ear to the Ground: A Companion
No.	Title	Length
1.	"The Big Picture" (Companion version)	5:26
2.	"You Will. You? Will. You? Will. You? Will." (Companion version) (featuring Becky Stark)	3:51
3.	"Laura Laurent" (Companion version) (featuring Becky Stark)	5:02
4.	"Nothing Gets Crossed Out" (Companion version) (featuring Gillian Welch)	4:10
5.	"November" (featuring Becky Stark) (Azure Ray)	4:09
6.	"Waste of Paint" (Companion version)	7:56

== Personnel ==
- Conor Oberst – guitar, piano, rhodes, organ, voice (tracks 1–13)
- Mike Mogis – banjos, bells, hammered dulcimer, vibraphone, glockenspiel, mandolin, guitar, dobro, pedal steel (tracks 2–9, 11–13)
- Matt Focht, Clint Schnase, Mike Sweeney – drums
- Todd Baechle, Jenny Lewis, Blake Sennett, Choir – vocal harmonies
- Andy LeMaster – electric guitar, keyboards, vocal harmonies (tracks 2–4, 6–8, 11)
- Clark Baechle – drums, clarinet
- Clay Leverett – drums, vocal harmonies
- Jiha Lee – flute, vocal harmonies (tracks 3, 6, 8, 9)
- Chris Brooks – piano (track 9)
- Gretta Cohn – cello (tracks 3, 5, 7, 12)
- Sean Cole – harmonica (tracks 9, 13)
- Julee Dunekacke – French horn (track 3)
- Margaret Fish – bassoon (tracks 3, 13)
- Orenda Fink – trumpet, vocal harmonies (tracks 2, 3, 7, 11, 13)
- Jason Flatowicz – trombone (tracks 3, 13)
- Tiffany Kowalski – violin (tracks 3, 5, 7, 12)
- Matt Maginn – bass (tracks 2, 4, 7, 9)
- Casey Scott – bass (tracks 3, 8, 9, 12, 13)
- Katie Muth – oboe (tracks 3, 6, 8, 12)
- Ted Stevens – electric guitar (track 9)
- Maria Taylor – piano, organ, vocal harmonies (tracks 2–4, 8, 12, 13)

== Charts ==
Chart performance
Chart (2002)	Peak position
Swedish Albums (Sverigetopplistan)	31
UK Albums (Official Charts)	138
UK Independent Albums (Official Charts)	18
US Billboard 200	161
US Heatseekers Albums (Billboard)	2
US Independent Albums (Billboard)	11
