= Bright Eyes (band) =

American indie rock band

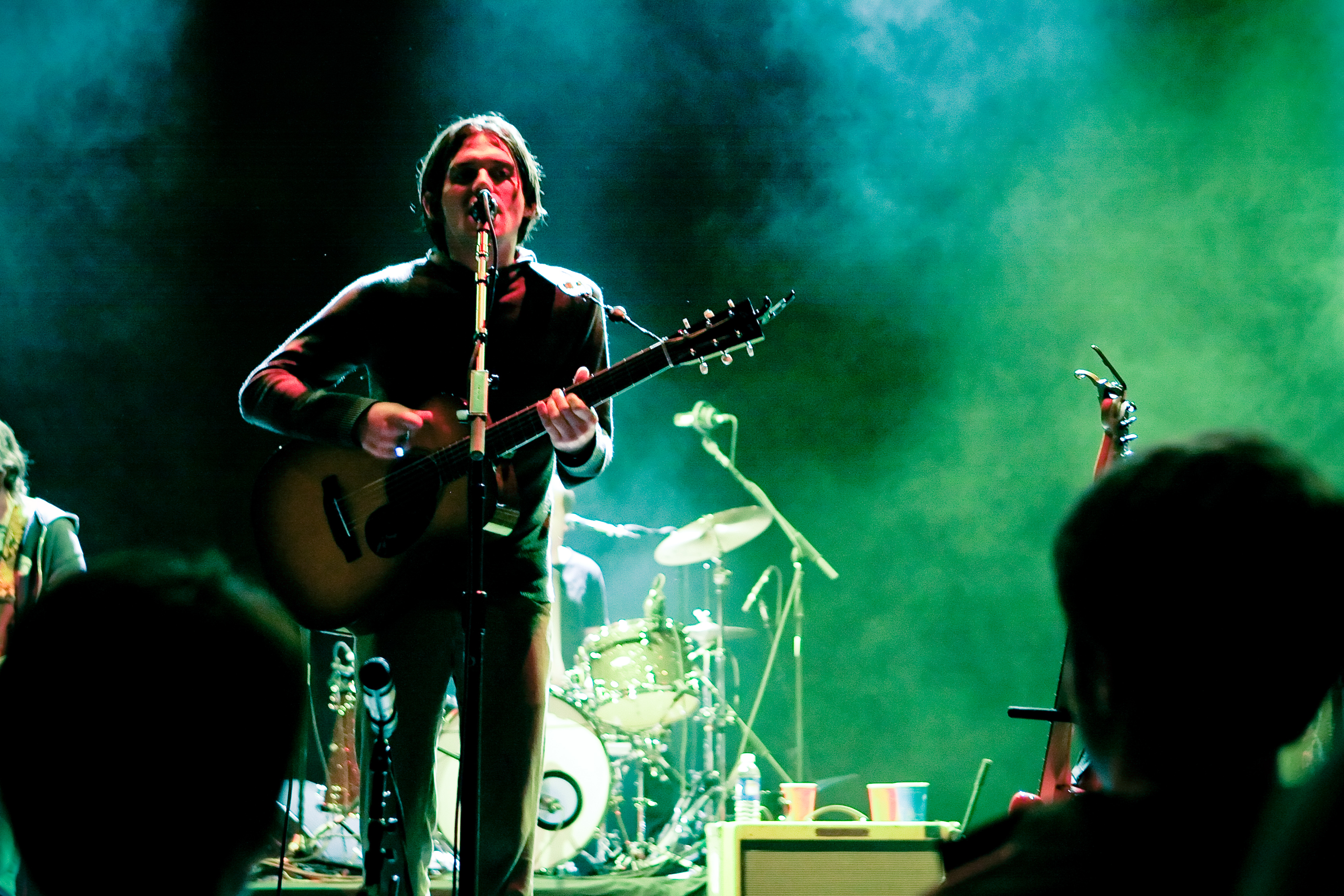
- Bright Eyes frontman Conor Oberst performing at the Lied Center in Lawrence, Kansas, on October 23, 2007

Background information
- Origin: Omaha, Nebraska, United States
- Genres: Indie folk; indie rock; folk rock; emo; emo-folk; alternative country
- Years active: 1995–2011, 2020–present
- Labels: Saddle Creek; Wichita; Polydor (outside North America); Dead Oceans
- Spinoffs: Desaparecidos; Conor Oberst and the Mystic Valley Band; Better Oblivion Community Center; Monsters of Folk
- Spinoff of: Commander Venus
- Members: Mike Mogis; Conor Oberst; Nate Walcott
- Website: thisisbrighteyes.com

Bright Eyes is an American indie rock band founded in Omaha, Nebraska, by singer-songwriter and guitarist Conor Oberst. It consists of Oberst; multi-instrumentalist and producer Mike Mogis; arranger, composer, trumpet and piano player Nate Walcott; and a rotating line-up of collaborators drawn primarily from Omaha's indie music scene.

Between 1998 and 2011, the band's albums were released through Saddle Creek Records, a Nebraska-based label founded by Justin Oberst (Conor's brother) and Mogis. In January 2020, the band announced their return, having signed with Dead Oceans. Their most recent album—Five Dice, All Threes—was released in September 2024.

== History ==
=== 1995–1998: A Collection of Songs Written and Recorded 1995–1997 ===
After being a founding member of Commander Venus—which disbanded in 1997—guitarist/vocalist Conor Oberst turned to focus on his new project, Bright Eyes. In 1998, he released 20 of the songs he had been stockpiling as the first official Bright Eyes album, A Collection of Songs Written and Recorded 1995–1997. The album saw Conor Oberst beginning to experiment with drum machines, keyboards and other instruments. The sound of the album ranges from bleating vocals to acoustic guitar songs and techno-style synthesizer instrumentals. Critical reaction was negative, with AllMusic saying that many of "the songs disintegrate as his vocals are reduced to the unintelligible babbling of a child. Any balance the music maintained up to that point, however fragile, is lost and so, more than likely, is the listener."

=== 1998–1999: Letting Off the Happiness ===
On November 2, 1998, Saddle Creek released Letting Off the Happiness, a ten-track album that displayed a more focused and clearer sound than the previous album. According to the Saddle Creek press release, it features members of Lullaby for the Working Class, Neutral Milk Hotel, and of Montreal. Park Ave. bandmate Neely Jenkins also contributed vocals. It was predominantly recorded in the Oberst family basement in Omaha on an analog eight track reel to reel; with some work also done at keyboardist Andy Lemaster's Athens, Georgia studio. Although almost all of the tracks feature a full band, "June on the West Coast" is performed with only acoustic guitar and vocals. "Padraic My Prince" gives a dramatic fictional account of the death of his baby brother, a story with a multitude of symbolic meanings. Oberst has referenced the song "Padraic My Prince" more than once in his music.
The song "An Attempt To Tip the Scales" on the album Fevers and Mirrors has a faux-interview near the end of the track. (Oberst is voiced by Todd Fink, who was a label-mate and had played in other bands with Oberst.) The interviewer is Matt Silcock, another labelmate on Saddle Creek Records. The interview was meant to be somewhat sarcastic and most of what the Oberst impersonator said was not true. At one point the interviewer asks the question: "So some of these references like babies in bathtubs are not biographical?" The Oberst impersonator replies: "Well I did have a brother who died in a bathtub... he drowned. Well actually I had five brothers that drowned." "No, I'm serious. My mother drowned one every year for five consecutive years. They were all named Padraic, and that's why they only got one song. It's kind of like walking out a door and discovering that it's a window." Oberst also references the song in "Cartoon Blues" on the Four Winds EP.

In November 1999, Bright Eyes released the five-song Every Day and Every Night EP, which included "Neely O'Hara" and "A Perfect Sonnet."

=== 2000–2003: Fevers and Mirrors, Lifted, and A Christmas Album ===
In 2000, Bright Eyes released Fevers and Mirrors, with new instruments such as the flute, piano, and accordion introduced into the song arrangements. After "An Attempt to Tip the Scales", there is a mock radio interview that features Todd Fink of The Faint doing an impression of Oberst while reading a script that Oberst wrote. In this interview, the fake Oberst presents a strange, contradictory explanation of his attitude towards his music. It acknowledges criticisms of his lyrics as overblown and insincere, which had begun to appear as the popularity of the band increased, but responds by stating that the lyrics are meant for personal interpretation. Oberst later commented that "It was a way to make fun of ourselves because the record is such a downer. I mean, that's one part of who I am but I also like laughing." The album placed 170 on Pitchfork Media's best 200 albums of the decade.

With Lifted or The Story Is in the Soil, Keep Your Ear to the Ground in 2002, Bright Eyes became one of the year's most celebrated "new" artists, despite having been recording under that moniker for a few years. They received national attention, including in several notable pieces in The New York Times, the Los Angeles Times, Time magazine, Rolling Stone, Blender, and Spin, many of which proclaimed Conor Oberst to be a significant new artist. The album was a commercial success and has sold over 250,000 copies, a breakthrough for the label and for all of the band's peers at that time. Oberst stated that, before making this record, both he and Mike Mogis had an idea for a "sort of grandiose sound" that neither could really put into words. This was also the first album made after Oberst's break to play with Desaparecidos. On December 1, 2002, Bright Eyes released their fifth studio album, A Christmas Album.

=== 2004–2006: I'm Wide Awake, It's Morning; Digital Ash in a Digital Urn; and Noise Floor ===
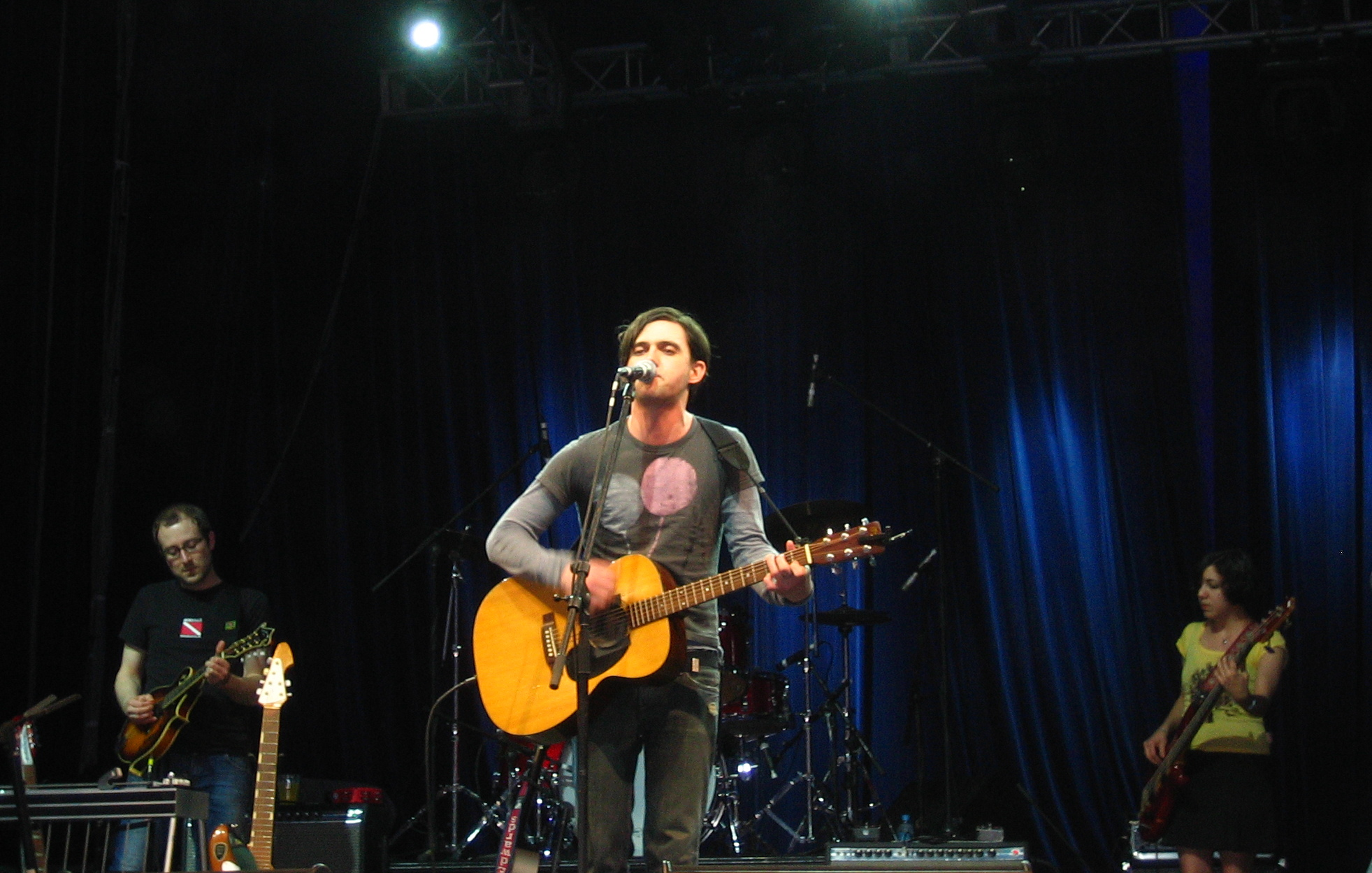
Bright Eyes in 2005

During the 2004 election season, Bright Eyes toured with Bruce Springsteen and R.E.M. on the Vote for Change tour, further pushing Bright Eyes into the public eye. Oberst sang numerous duets with the likes of Springsteen and Neil Young.

January 25, 2005 saw the release of two distinctly different Bright Eyes albums: the folk-influenced I'm Wide Awake, It's Morning and the electronic-pop inflected Digital Ash in a Digital Urn. An extensive world tour followed the release of those albums. Part one of the tour was in support of I'm Wide Awake and the second part was in support of Digital Ash. The first part was more similar to past tours with an intimate band setting. The decision to split the tour this way was practical as it would have been a "logistical nightmare" in terms of equipment and staff to perform songs from both albums simultaneously. By the end of January 2005, I'm Wide Awake was No. 10 on the Billboard charts while Digital Ash was No. 15.

In early 2005, Bright Eyes supported R.E.M. in their tour of Australia and New Zealand, as well as headlined shows themselves. On May 2, 2005 Bright Eyes appeared on The Tonight Show with Jay Leno and performed the protest song "When the President Talks to God" directed at President George W. Bush. A 7" vinyl single of the song was sold at concerts soon after and was also released as a free track on iTunes. In November 2005, Bright Eyes performed "True Blue" on the children's television show Pancake Mountain.

Bright Eyes has actively protested against the Clear Channel media company. Oberst has vocally advocated the boycotting of all Clear Channel events, venues, and radio stations, perhaps most publicly at the Shortlist Awards show at the Wiltern Theatre in Los Angeles on October 5, 2003. On November 9, 2005, Bright Eyes canceled their November 12 show in St. Louis, Missouri, upon discovering that the venue was associated with Clear Channel.

Bright Eyes won Artist of the Year and Song of the Year for "When the President Talks to God" at the 2006 PLUG Independent Music Awards and a special recognition award for the video for "First Day of My Life" at the 17th GLAAD Media Awards. Additionally, Time listed I'm Wide Awake, It's Morning as one of the top ten albums of 2005. Later in the year, the live album Motion Sickness was released, documenting the I'm Wide Awake, It's Morning tour.

In a skit on the May 20, 2006 episode of Saturday Night Live, Neil Young (played by Kevin Spacey) was joined by Dixie Chicks and "indie sensation Bright Eyes" (played by Andy Samberg), all of whom have been public in their criticism of George W. Bush.

After releasing three albums in 2005, Oberst stated that he did not plan to release an album in 2006.

On October 24, 2006, a compilation of rare tracks entitled Noise Floor (Rarities: 1998–2005) was released.

=== 2007–2008: Cassadaga ===
On March 8, 2007, Oberst appeared on National Public Radio's All Songs Considered, playing a selection of tracks in his collection, as well as several from Four Winds.

Bright Eyes released the Four Winds EP in March 2007, featuring the first single from their seventh studio album Cassadaga, released in April 2007. The track "Endless Entertainment" circulated over the internet from the new official site, ThisIsBrightEyes.com. In a 2007 issue, Rolling Stone labeled "Four Winds" as a top 100 song of the year.

Cassadaga reached number four in the United States, making it the band's biggest commercial success. In support of this album, Bright Eyes toured North America from February to May, and Europe and Japan from June to July. The twelve musicians included two drummers, and they donned white uniforms in front of a video backdrop.

During an encore on May 19, 2007 at the Ryman Auditorium in Nashville, Tennessee, Oberst performed a new song with Gillian Welch and David Rawlings entitled "Man Named Truth". The song was officially released on Monsters of Folk's 2009 self-titled album, on which Oberst teams up with Jim James (of My Morning Jacket), M. Ward (of She & Him), and Mike Mogis (of Bright Eyes).

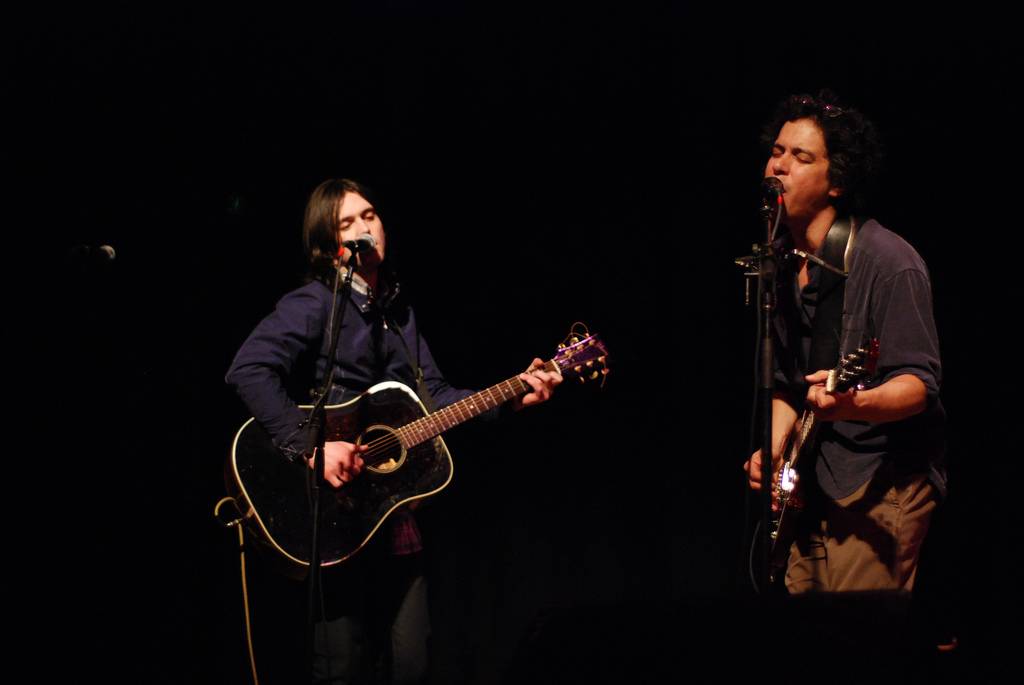
Conor Oberst and M. Ward at The Town Hall.

During a 7-night stint at The Town Hall in New York City, Bright Eyes welcomed the following guests on stage for special performances: Lou Reed on May 25; Ben Kweller on May 26; Jenny Lewis and Johnathan Rice on May 28; Norah Jones, Little Willie and Derrick E on May 29; Nick Zinner, Maria Taylor and Ben Gibbard on May 30, Steve Earle on May 31, and finally Ron Sexsmith and Britt Daniel on June 1.

On June 4, 2007, they performed "Hot Knives" on the Late Show with David Letterman.

A double-single for "Hot Knives" and "If the Brakeman Turns My Way" was released on July 9, 2007.

In August 2007, Bright Eyes postponed 3 UK shows due to illness. A U.S. tour was announced, and in September, the UK dates were canceled and not rescheduled.

On September 29, 2007, they performed with the Los Angeles Philharmonic at the historic Hollywood Bowl.

Bright Eyes performed at a Barack Obama rally in Omaha, Nebraska on February 7, 2008.

Zachary Nipper, the album's art director, was awarded the 2008 Grammy Award for Best Recording Package.

=== 2008–2011: The People's Key ===
Bright Eyes went on an unofficial hiatus after the release of Cassadaga in 2007. During 2008 and 2009, Oberst recorded music and toured in support of his other music projects, Conor Oberst and the Mystic Valley Band and supergroup Monsters of Folk. In a June 2009 issue of Rolling Stone, Oberst announced that he wanted to "retire" the Bright Eyes moniker, and would be making one final album with the band: "It does feel like it needs to stop at some point. I'd like to clean it up, lock the door, say goodbye." Saddle Creek Records reissued their Neva Dinova split One Jug of Wine, Two Vessels on March 23, 2010 with four brand-new songs recorded in late 2009.

On July 31, 2010, Bright Eyes teamed up with the American Civil Liberties Union (ACLU) of Nebraska to put on a concert for equality in Omaha, Nebraska. The concert raised money for a federal lawsuit the ACLU filed against the city of Fremont, Nebraska for an ordinance the city passed on June 21, 2010 banning the hiring of or the rental of properties to illegal immigrants. At this show, Bright Eyes debuted a new song entitled "Coyote Song" about two lovers separated by the Mexico–United States border.

The People's Key was released on February 15, 2011, Conor Oberst's birthday. Conor Oberst has stated that the sound of The People's Key moves away from the folk sound that the band had accomplished on previous records. "We're over the Americana, rootsy, whatever that sound is. People say country but I never thought we were very country at all. But whatever that element is or that aesthetic is, I guess it's worn a little thin for me these days. So we very much wanted it to be rocking and, for lack of a better term, contemporary, or modern."

The video for the song "Shell Games" was released via Saddle Creek Records on both the band's YouTube channel and that of Saddle Creek, and features the band playing against various projections. On February 24, the band performed "Jejune Stars" on the Late Show with David Letterman. They performed "Beginner's Mind" on The Tonight Show on April 14, 2011. On June 10, Bright Eyes released the music video for "Jejune Stars". The video features the band playing in a desert with a firework rig behind them, spelling out selected lyrics as Oberst sings them. In June, July, and August 2011, the band performed shows on tour with The Mountain Goats. The band finished the year with a tour of Australia, performing at Harvest Festival as well as select headlining shows.

Bright Eyes performed a final show in Honolulu, Hawaii, on November 21, 2011. Bright Eyes went on an unofficial hiatus as members Oberst, Mogis, and Walcott each pursued different projects.

=== 2012–2019: Hiatus and reissues ===
In July 2016, it was announced that the band's six last studio albums (excluding the Christmas release) were to be reissued in a box set titled The Studio Albums 2000–2011. Fevers and Mirrors, Lifted or The Story Is in the Soil, Keep Your Ear to the Ground, I'm Wide Awake, It's Morning, Digital Ash in a Digital Urn, and Cassadaga were remastered by Bob Ludwig. The box set was released on September 16, 2016. Individual releases were also issued later in the year.

=== 2020–2023: Down in the Weeds, Where the World Once Was and Companion series ===
In January 2020, Bright Eyes launched an Instagram page and teased a 2020 return. On March 24 they released "Persona Non Grata", their first new song in 9 years. NME's Luke Morgan Britton wrote of the track: "[A] dual sense of societal dystopia and inner turmoil collide and intertwine on the quietly poignant 'Persona Non Grata'... [It] sees the band maintain the sage-like, cryptic feel of their latter-day records. Yet it also returns to the intimacy and immediacy of their early material."

Bright Eyes released the single "Forced Convalescence" on April 21, 2020. The song features Flea from Red Hot Chili Peppers on bass along with a gospel choir. On May 27, 2020, the single "One & Done" was released along with a lyric video.

The band announced their tenth album, Down in the Weeds, Where the World Once Was, on June 22, 2020. On the same day, they released a new single, "Mariana Trench". The album was released on August 21, 2020.

Bright Eyes released the song "Miracle of Life" featuring Phoebe Bridgers on October 28, 2020. The song was made to benefit Planned Parenthood.

On February 1, 2022 the band announced plans to reissue their first nine studio albums under Dead Oceans. Each reissue would be accompanied by a six-track companion EP featuring re-recorded songs from their respective albums and covers. The first three companion EPs released on May 27, 2022. The same day, "Falling Out of Love at This Volume", "Contrast and Compare" (featuring Waxahatchee), and "Haligh, Haligh, A Lie, Haligh (featuring Phoebe Bridgers)" were released as singles from the A Collection of Songs Written and Recorded 1995–1997, Letting Off the Happiness, and Fevers and Mirrors companion EPs, respectively. A cover of Elliott Smith's "St. Ides Heaven" with vocals from Bridgers was released as the second single from Letting Off the Happiness: A Companion on March 22, 2022.

=== 2024–present: Five Dice, All Threes and Kids Table ===
On September 20, 2024, the band released its eleventh studio album, Five Dice, All Threes. The album is the second of a two-album deal that the band signed with Dead Oceans back in 2018. Regarding the album's dice-themed framing device, Oberst stated: "Life is a game of chance and a metaphorical street brawl, so that is what we are putting out there." The day before the album's release, the band cancelled its supporting tour dates stating: "We’re heartbroken to announce that our upcoming record release shows have been cancelled. The warm-up shows we played earlier this week resulted in Conor losing his voice and, on the advice of doctors, we’ve made the difficult but sensible decision to prioritise rest and recuperation for the remainder of the month." The band later toured extensively across 2025, following Oberst's recovery.

In September 2025, the band released Kids Table, an eight-track EP consisting of additional songs recorded during the sessions for Five Dice, All Threes. On the day of the EP's release, the band stated: "During the simpler times when we were putting out records on our own label, Saddle Creek, we’d release EPs as precursors to albums. They’d usually feature one song from the upcoming record, with up to five additional b-sides that didn’t make the album. Kids Table is essentially the same concept, but a year after Five Dice, All Threes came out, instead of beforehand like we used to do. [...] The songs are pieces that we all loved, but didn’t fit into the puzzle of Five Dice. So come eat off an ironing board with us."

== Musical style ==
According to Leonie Cooper of NME, Bright Eyes "was a noughties update on Bob Dylan and Gram Parsons’ 1960s sound."

== Members ==
- Conor Oberst – lead vocals, guitar, piano, organ, keyboards, bass, percussion, drums (1995–2011, 2020–present)
- Mike Mogis – guitar, banjo, mandolin, pedal steel, dulcimer, dobro, organ, bass, percussion, keyboards, programming, sampler (1998–2011, 2020–present)
- Nate Walcott – piano, organ, keyboards, synthesizer, trumpet (touring, 2002-2005; member, 2006–2011, 2020–present)

Current touring musicians

- MiWi La Lupa – keyboards, flugelhorn, acoustic and electric guitar, percussion, drums, bass, backing vocals (2023–present)
- Alex "Orange Drink" Levine – bass, backing vocals (2024–present)
- Conor Elmes - drums

Former touring musicians

- Nick Zinner – guitar, keyboards (2005)
- Jason Boesel – drums (2005–2007)
- Clay Leverett - drums (2007-?)
- Jon Theodore – drums (2021–2023)
- Orenda Fink – bass, backing vocals (2023)
- Maria Taylor – drums, backing vocals (2000, 2001, 2023)
- Simon Joyner – keyboards (2003)
- Jiha Lee - flute, electric bass, electric guitar, backing vocals (2000-2001)
- Laura Burhenn - sampler, keyboards, piano, backing vocals (2011)
- Andy Lemaster - guitar, keyboards (2000); bass (2011); studio contributions (guitar, bass, keyboards, vocals) (1998-2011, 2021)
- K. Muth - oboe (2003; European tour)
- Clark Baechele - drums (2004, 2005, 2011); studio contributions (2002-2011)
- Stefanie Drootin - bass (2000)

== Discography ==
Studio albums

- A Collection of Songs Written and Recorded 1995–1997 (1998)
- Letting Off the Happiness (1998)
- Fevers and Mirrors (2000)
- Lifted or The Story Is in the Soil, Keep Your Ear to the Ground (2002)
- A Christmas Album (2002)
- I'm Wide Awake, It's Morning (2005)
- Digital Ash in a Digital Urn (2005)
- Cassadaga (2007)
- The People's Key (2011)
- Down in the Weeds, Where the World Once Was (2020)
- Five Dice, All Threes (2024)
