= Orenda Fink =

American musician (born 1975)

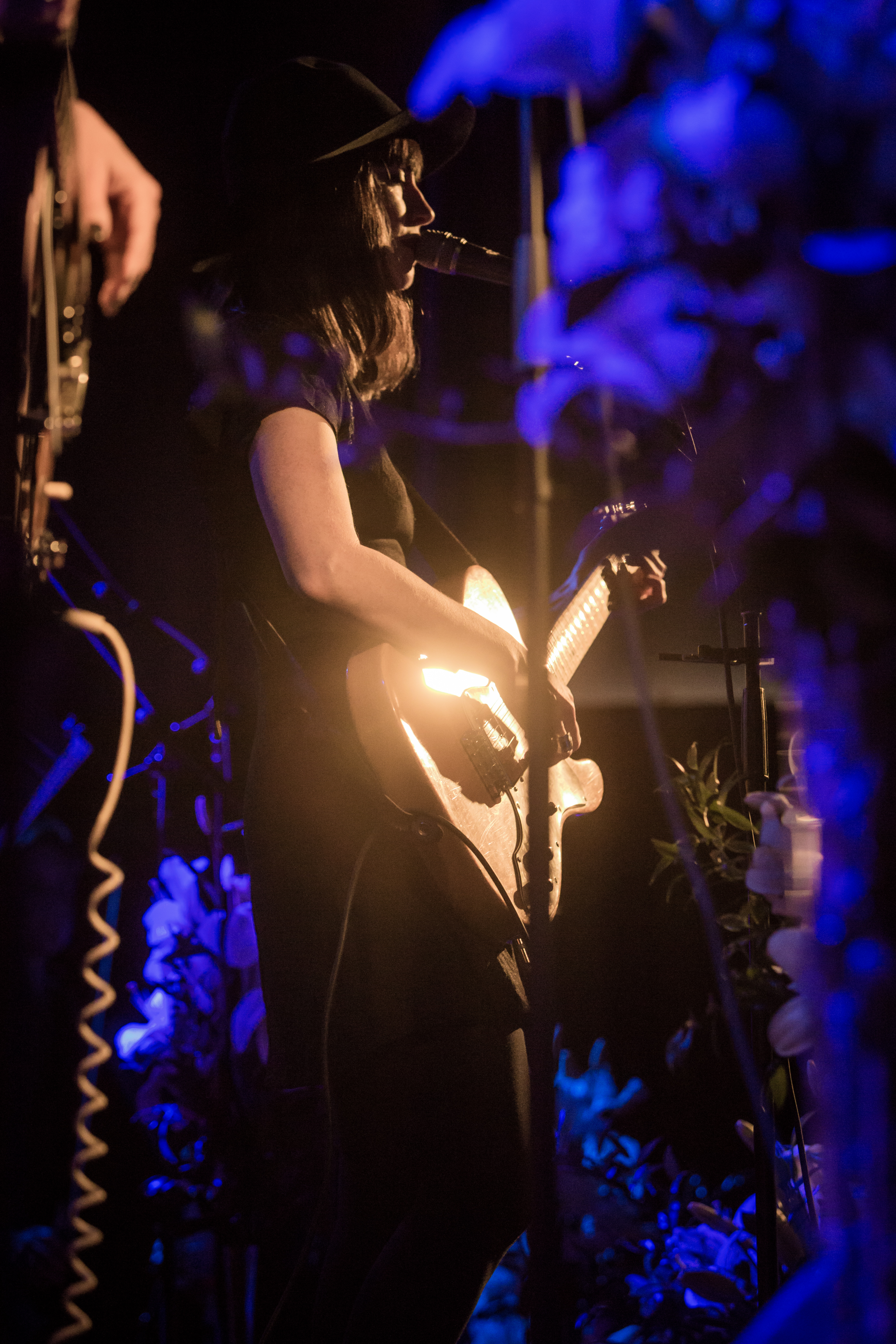
- Fink performing with Azure Ray in Los Angeles, 2018. Photo by Veronika Reinert.

Background information
- Born: September 18, 1975 (age 51); Birmingham, Alabama, U.S.
- Genres: Indie rock, dream pop
- Instruments: Vocals, guitar, bass guitar, trumpet
- Labels: Flower Moon Records; Saddle Creek Records; Warm Records
- Website: www.orendafink.com

Orenda Fink is an American singer, musician, and writer. Perhaps best known as half of the duo Azure Ray, Fink is also a member of Art in Manila, O+S, Closeness, and High Up, and has played with or appeared as a guest on records by Bright Eyes, Conor Oberst, Moby, The Faint, Pete Yorn, and others. She is married to Todd Fink (formerly Todd Baechle) of The Faint.

== Biography ==
Born in Birmingham, Alabama, in 1975, Fink started her musical career at the age of fifteen in the band Little Red Rocket. The band released two CDs, Who Did You Pay (1997, Tim/Kerr) and It's in the Sound (2000, Monolyth Record Group). After the group disbanded, Fink and her bandmate Maria Taylor moved to Athens, Georgia, where they formed Azure Ray. (Drummer Louis Schefano would go on to be a founding member of Remy Zero). The pair signed to Warm Records and released two albums, their self-titled debut in 2001, and Burn and Shiver in 2002, both produced by Eric Bachmann (Archers of Loaf, Crooked Fingers). After meeting Bright Eyes front man Conor Oberst in Athens, he invited the duo on tour and introduced them to Saddle Creek Records. Also in 2002, Fink and Taylor co-wrote and recorded two songs with Moby - "The Great Escape" (which appeared on his album 18) and “Landing” (which appeared on the XXX soundtrack) - and afterwards joined him on tour. Saddle Creek released Azure Ray's November EP later in 2002, as well as their third album, Hold On Love, and its single, "The Drinks We Drank Last Night", in 2003, after which the band went on a six-year hiatus.

Fink released her first solo album, Invisible Ones, on August 23, 2005. She said she had a spiritual awakening while in Haiti and her solo music is inspired, in part, by Haitian folk music. In 2006, she formed a new band, Art in Manila (originally called Art Bell), with members of The Good Life, The Anniversary, and others. Saddle Creek released the band's album, Set the Woods On Fire, on August 7, 2007.

On November 30, 2008, Azure Ray reformed for a one-off show at Los Angeles's iconic Troubadour. The duo was accompanied by Andy LeMaster of Now It's Overhead and Nick White of Tilly and the Wall.

Earlier in 2008, Fink began collaborating with a long-time friend, Remy Zero bassist Cedric LeMoyne, on a project called O+S. Their songs were initially inspired by sounds she had recorded in Haiti, among other places, and loops crafted by LeMoyne out of those recordings. O+S' self-titled debut album was released on March 24, 2009 by Saddle Creek. The following October, Fink released her second solo album, Ask the Night, which Pitchfork called more "austere and rustic" with "intricate soundscapes". The single "High Ground" features guest vocals by Isaac Brock of Modest Mouse; another single, "Why Is the Night Sad", had been previously played by Azure Ray at their 2008 reunion show.

In 2009, Taylor announced on KCRW's Morning Becomes Eclectic that Azure Ray was reforming on a semi-permanent basis to play "five or six" shows, then beginning work on a new album. Their fourth album, Drawing Down the Moon, was released in September 2010. An outtake from those sessions, "Silverlake", featuring Mark Linkous of Sparklehorse, was released as a standalone digital single in 2011.

Later in 2011, Fink began another collaborative project, this time with occasional Of Montreal member Nina Barnes; "after hanging out together in Athens, Georgia", they "decided to form a DJing and performance art duo." As part of their performance exploring the "dark and the light of the female condition", Barnes and Fink incorporated zombies, sword battles, strawberries and whipped cream, paint and glitter, and Asian aesthetic influences into their earlier shows as part of a "hedonistic celebration of all life's earthly delights". Rolling Stone premiered their track "The Swamp Theme" on October 28, 2011, and their debut release, a double 7-inch vinyl single, was released in November 2012.

Also in 2012, Fink and a pregnant Taylor entered the studio to record new Azure Ray material in collaboration with Andy LeMaster and Todd Fink. A six-song EP, As Above So Below, was released on September 5, 2012, on Saddle Creek. "The band wanted to break from the folksy, indie acoustic sound they’d established... It’s trance-inducing and minimalist... and their haunting voices are still just as lovely as ever" said Paste magazine.

Fink began recording her third solo album in December 2013, working with her "dream team" of Ben Brodin, Todd Fink, and Bill Rieflin. She was "inspired to write the songs...after her beloved dog of 16 years, Wilson, passed away" and she later began "writing in a dream journal every day, [when] the ideas of the album came forth". The resulting album, Blue Dream, was released by Saddle Creek on August 19, 2014. NPR praised it as a "collection of distinctly futuristic love songs".

In November 2015, Fink underwent emergency heart surgery for an issue she'd been aware of since childhood, but had never dealt with. After months spent recovering, she eventually began working again, first with painting and writing in journals. Although she and her husband Todd had talked about starting a band together numerous times since getting married in 2005, they finally began working on a new project in early 2016, eventually taking the name Closeness. Personality Therapy, the debut EP by Closeness, was released on February 24, 2017, via Graveface Records. That same year, O+S released their second record, You Were Once the Sun, Now You're the Moon, on Saddle Creek. Fink had also spent 2017 working on a new band with her sister, Christine Fink, called High Up. Their debut album, called You Are Here, was released on Conor Oberst's label, Team Love Records. Atwood Magazine reviewed the album positively, calling it "passionate, heartfelt and energetic", "soulful", and "a raw, intimate portrait of turmoil and inner strength".

The previous November, Azure Ray announced that they would once again reunite for a one-off show in Los Angeles on January 20, 2018. On September 26, Stereogum premiered a new Azure Ray single called "Palindrome", heralding the release of their first new record in six years, the Waves (Azure Ray EP)|Waves EP, on October 26, 2018, this time on Maria Taylor's own label, Flower Moon Records. Billboard premiered a new recording of the title track of their 2003 album, "Hold On Love", reflecting the ways the song had changed after years of playing it live. KCRW premiered the "hauntingly beautiful" video for EP's second single, "Last Summer in Omaha" (directed by Nik Fackler), on October 25.

Closeness spent May 2019 opening for The Faint on the American leg of their tour for Egowerk. In addition to performing tracks from their 2017 EP, they premiered new songs and a cover of Sebadoh's "Brand New Love". In October 2020, Fink announced that her solo discography had moved to long-time collaborator Maria Taylor's label, Flower Moon Records. 2020 also celebrated the 20th Anniversary of Azure Ray' self-titled album, which was released on vinyl for the first time. Azure Ray announced their first album in 10 years, "Remedy," in March 2021. Recording during COVID-19 pandemic, the album's title track was released on March 25, 2021.

== Writing ==
In 2018, the first excerpts of Fink's memoir were published in the anthology Rockhaven: A History of Interiors, published by Which Witch LA. Hyperallergic.com said "the narrative strength of the anthology is carried by Adriana Widdoes, Orenda Fink, Johanna Hedva, and Suzanne Scanlon, whose generational accounts of their grandmother, mother, and selves, respectively, are as vivid as they are heartbreaking... Stoic, evocative, and heartbreaking, Fink brings us into the room and leaves us there. Stories of psychosis rarely resolve themselves and this literary choice rings true even if it isn't traditionally cathartic".

== Discography ==
- Bloodline EP (iTunes Exclusive, 2005; now Flower Moon Records)
- Invisible Ones (Saddle Creek Records, 2005; now Flower Moon Records)
- Ask the Night (Saddle Creek, 2009; now Flower Moon Records)
- Blue Dream (Saddle Creek, 2014; now Flower Moon Records)

=== with Little Red Rocket ===
- Who Did You Pay (1997, Tim/Kerr)
- It's in the Sound (2000, Monolyth Record Group)

=== with Azure Ray ===
- Azure Ray (Warm Electronic Recordings, 2001; now Flower Moon Records)
- Burn and Shiver (Warm, 2002; now Flower Moon Records)
- "Sleep" single (Rubber Records, 2002)
- November EP (Saddle Creek, 2002; now Flower Moon Records)
- Hold On Love (Saddle Creek, 2003)
- "The Drinks We Drank Last Night" single (Saddle Creek, 2003; now Flower Moon Records)
- "New Resolution" single (Saddle Creek, 2004; now Flower Moon Records)
- Drawing Down the Moon (Saddle Creek, 2010; now Flower Moon Records)
- "Don't Leave My Mind" single (Saddle Creek, 2010); now Flower Moon Records)
- "Silverlake" single (Saddle Creek, 2011; now Flower Moon Records)
- As Above So Below EP (Saddle Creek, 2012; now Flower Moon Records)
- Waves EP (Flower Moon Records, 2018)
- Remedy LP (Flower Moon Records, 2021)

=== with Art in Manila ===
- Set the Woods On Fire (Saddle Creek, 2007; now Flower Moon Records)

=== O+S ===
- O+S (Saddle Creek, 2009; now Flower Moon Records)
- You Were Once the Sun, Now You're the Moon (Saddle Creek, 2017; now Flower Moon Records)

=== Closeness ===
- Personality Therapy (Graveface Records, 2017)

=== High Up ===
- You Are Here (Team Love Records, 2018)

=== Compilations ===
- Saddle Creek 50 (Saddle Creek, 2003)
- Lagniappe: A Saddle Creek Benefit for Hurricane Katrina Relief (Saddle Creek, 2005)
- Flower Moon Records Friends and Family Volume 1 (Flower Moon, 2018)

=== Other appearances ===
- Crooked Fingers - Crooked Fingers (Warm, 2000)
- Crooked Fingers - Bring On the Snakes (Warm, 2001)
- Moby - 18 (Mute Records/V2 Records, 2002)
- Bright Eyes - There Is No Beginning to the Story (Saddle Creek, 2002)
- Bright Eyes - Lifted or The Story is in the Soil, Keep Your Ear to the Ground (Saddle Creek, 2002)
- Bright Eyes/Neva Dinova - One Jug of Wine, Two Vessels (Crank! A Record Company, 2004)
- The Elected - Me First (Saddle Creek, 2004)
- The Faint - Wet from Birth (Saddle Creek, 2004)
- McCarthy Trenching - McCarthy Trenching (Team Love, 2007).
- Pete Yorn - Back and Fourth (Columbia Records, 2009)
- Conor Oberst - Upside Down Mountain (Nonesuch Records, 2014)

== Videography ==
- "Bloodline" (2005, directed by Nik Fackler)
- "Leave It All" (2006, directed by Rudolf Buitendach)
- "That Certain-Something Spring" (2009, directed by Chris Lawson)
- "Permanent Scar" (2009, directed by Aaron Gum)
- "We Do What We Want To" (2009, directed by Chris Lawson and Antonio Scarlata)
- "Why Is the Night Sad" (2010, directed by Ryan Berg)
- "High Ground" (2010, directed by Chris Lawson)
- "This Is a Part of Something Greater" (2014, directed by Aaron Gum)
- "You Can Be Loved" (2014, directed by Amelie Raoul)
- "Ace of Cups" (2014, directed by Nik Fackler)
- "Holy, Holy" (2015, directed by Mike Tully)

Fink has also appeared in the music videos for "Lovers Need Lawyers" by The Good Life and "Yellow Datsun" by Neva Dinova.
