= Azure Ray (album) =

Studio album by Azure Ray
- Released: January 16, 2001
- Studio: WARM Recording Studio, Athens, GA,
- Genre: Dream pop
- Length: 39:30
- Label: Flower Moon Records; Warm Electronic
- Producer: Eric Bachmann; Brian Causey

Azure Ray chronology
Azure Ray (2001)	Burn and Shiver (2002)

Singles from Azure Ray
- 1. "Sleep" Released: 2002

Professional ratings
Review scores
Source	Rating
Pitchfork	7/10 stars
Allmusic	3/5 stars

Azure Ray is the debut studio album by American duo Azure Ray, consisting of Maria Taylor and Orenda Fink. It was originally released on January 16, 2001 by Warm Electronic Recordings.

== Background ==
After their previous band disbanded, Taylor and Fink moved to Athens, Georgia where they formed Azure Ray. They signed to WARM and recorded the self-titled record with Eric Bachmann (Crooked Fingers and Archers of Loaf). Pitchfork praised the duo's debut, giving it a 7 out of 10, calling their debut "maudlin but beautiful, expertly crafted pop songs." The song "Sleep" was later featured in the 2006 Academy Award-nominated movie, The Devil Wears Prada featuring Anne Hathaway. DJ Paul Kalkbrenner sampled "Rise" in his 2008 hit song "Azure." In 2015, Taylor Swift included "Sleep" in a 6-song "breakup playlist" made for a fan via her official Tumblr. In 2018, it was re-released on Taylor's label, Flower Moon Records.

== In popular culture ==
- "Sleep" is featured in both the film The Devil Wears Prada (2006) and in the Cold Case episode "Fly away" from season 1.
- "Displaced" is featured in the Buffy the Vampire Slayer episode "Seeing Red" from Season 6, and Felicity Season 2, episode 12 "The Slump."
- "Rise" is featured in the film Winter Passing (2005).

== Track listing ==
All songs produced by Eric Bachmann and Brian Causey.

Azure Ray
No.	Title	Length
1.	"Sleep"	5:03
2.	"Displaced"	3:41
3.	"Don't Make a Sound"	3:06
4.	"Untitled"	0:38
5.	"Another Week"	3:13
6.	"Rise"	5:20
7.	"4th of July"	4:13
8.	"Safe and Sound"	3:03
9.	"Fever"	4:40
10.	"For No One"	3:16
11.	"How Will You Survive"	3:17
Total length:		39:30
