= Man o' war =

Man o' War was a thoroughbred racehorse considered an all-time great.

Man o' War (or capitalization variations thereof) may also refer to:

== Animals ==
- Portuguese man o' war, a floating marine animal found in the Atlantic that resembles a jellyfish
- Man o' war, alternate name for the magnificent frigatebird
- Man-of-war fish, a driftfish known for living in the tentacles of the Portuguese man o' war.

== Media ==
- Man O' War (game), a naval wargame by Games Workshop
- Gigabolt Man-O-War, a boss character in the video game Mega Man X8

== Military ==
- Man-of-war (aka Man o' war), a heavily armed warship from the 16th to the 19th centuries
- Man O' War (paramilitary), voluntary paramilitary organization in Nigeria.

== Places ==
- Man O' War Bay (disambiguation)
- Man-O-War Cay, an island in the Bahamas
- Man of War, County Dublin, rural townland in North County Dublin, Ireland

== Other uses ==
- Man-O-War GFC, a Gaelic Football club based in Ireland
- Manowar, a heavy metal band
- Man o' War Boulevard, Lexington, Kentucky, U.S.
- Man O' War, the first song on the album To the Races by Eric Bachmann
- Man o' War, a former Central of Georgia passenger train operating from Atlanta to Columbus, Georgia
- Man O' War, a brand of cigar manufactured by A. J. Fernandez Cigars

== See also ==
- Justin Credible, former WWF wrestler who went by the name "Aldo Montoya, the Portuguese Man O' War"
- Man of war (disambiguation)
- Men of war (disambiguation)
