= Red Devil Dawn =

Studio album by Crooked Fingers
- Released: January 21, 2003
- Genre: Indie rock
- Length: 41:11
- Label: Merge
- Producer: Eric Bachmann; Brian Causey

Crooked Fingers chronology
Reservoir Songs (2002)	Red Devil Dawn (2003)	Dignity and Shame (2005)

Professional ratings
Review scores
Source	Rating
AllMusic	4.5/5 stars
Pitchfork	7.9/10

Red Devil Dawn (2003) is the third studio album recorded by the indie rock band Crooked Fingers. Released by Merge Records in January 2003, Red Devil Dawn is the follow-up to 2001's Bring On the Snakes and is the first album released by Crooked Fingers on Merge.

== Track listing ==
1. "Big Darkness" - 4:40
2. "Don't Say a Word" - 5:11
3. "You Can Never Leave" - 3:49
4. "Bad Man Coming" - 3:24
5. "You Threw a Spark" - 3:16
6. "A Boy with (100) Hands" - 4:11
7. "Sweet Marie" - 4:55
8. "Angelina" - 3:31
9. "Disappear" - 4:16
10. "Carrion Doves" - 3:58
