= Vitus Tinnitus =

EP by Archers of Loaf
- Released: 1997
- Genre: Indie rock
- Label: Alias

Archers of Loaf chronology
The Speed of Cattle (1996)	Vitus Tinnitus (1997)	White Trash Heroes (1998)

Professional ratings
Review scores
Source	Rating
AllMusic	3/5 stars
Robert Christgau	(1-star Honorable Mention)

Vitus Tinnitus is a live EP by Archers of Loaf, their first officially released live recording. It was released in 1997. The first six tracks were recorded live at The Middle East in Cambridge, MA, on October 26, 1996. The last two tracks are remixes from All the Nations Airports.

== Track listing ==
1. "Harnessed in Slums"
2. "Underdogs of Nipomo"
3. "Greatest of All Time"
4. "Form and File"
5. "Audiowhore"
6. "Nostalgia"
7. "Vocal Shrapnel (Remix)"
8. "Scenic Pastures (Remix)"
