= Breaks in the Armor =

Studio album by Crooked Fingers
- Released: 2011
- Genre: Indie rock
- Label: Merge

Crooked Fingers chronology
Forfeit/Fortune (2008)	Breaks in the Armor (2011)

Breaks in the Armor is an album by the American alternative rock band Crooked Fingers, released in 2011. It was released the same year as the reunion of Archers of Loaf, Eric Bachmann's previous band.

The album peaked at No. 23 on Billboard's Top Heatseekers chart.

== Production ==
Most of the album was written in Taipei, where Bachmann was working as an ESL teacher. It was recorded in Athens, Georgia, with the engineer Matt Yelton. Liz Durrett provided backing vocals.

== Critical reception ==
Professional ratings
Review scores
Source	Rating
AllMusic	4/5 stars
Pitchfork	6.7/10
Spin	8/10 stars
Tiny Mix Tapes	4/5 stars

The A.V. Club wrote that "these are some of the most melodious songs Bachmann has recorded, verging on the poppy with the bouncy 'The Counterfeiter' and angling toward the aspirational with the pounding, rising 'Went To The City'." Exclaim! thought that "with its richly layered arrangements and intimate framework, Breaks in the Armor is generally pleasing, and one of the finest Crooked Fingers releases yet." Spin called Bachmann "indie rock's most refreshingly unpretentious auteur."

The New York Times concluded that "previous Crooked Fingers albums have been more elaborately orchestrated, fortifying themselves; this one, even when cushioned by Liz Durrett’s backup vocals, makes a wary peace with its own sense of isolation." The Cleveland Scene deemed the album "a rousing and occasionally accessible record that ranks as one of Bachmann's all-time best." Indy Week concluded that "the sparse folk palette is livened by moments of distortion that echo Bachmann's dark themes of uncertainty and mistrust."

== Track listing ==
No.	Title	Length
1.	"Typhoon"
2.	"Bad Blood"
3.	"The Hatchet"
4.	"The Counterfeiter"
5.	"Heavy Hours"
6.	"Black Candles"
7.	"Went to the City"
8.	"Your Apocalypse"
9.	"War Horses"
10.	"She Tows the Line"
11.	"Our New Favorite"
