= Waves (Azure Ray EP) =

2018 EP by Azure Ray

EP by Azure Ray
- Released: October 26, 2018
- Genre: Dream pop
- Length: 16:00
- Label: Flower Moon Records
- Producer: Azure Ray; Louis Schefano

Azure Ray chronology
As Above So Below (2010)	Waves (2018)

Waves is the eighth studio release by American duo Azure Ray, consisting of Maria Taylor and Orenda Fink. It was released on October 26, 2018, on Flower Moon Records.

== Background ==
After a five-year hiatus following the release of As Above So Below, the band announced in October 2017 that their self-titled debut and Burn and Shiver were now on Taylor's label. A few weeks later, a cryptic message teasing an "important announcement" was posted to the band's social media accounts and on November 17, 2017, Taylor and Fink announced they would once again reunite for a one-off show in Los Angeles at the Lodge Room on January 20, 2018. In August 2018, a second reunion show, this time in their hometown of Omaha, was announced for October 26, 2018.

On September 26, 2018 Stereogum announced their new EP and first new record in 6 years, Waves and premiered a new single, "Palindrome," calling it a "mournful string-driven ballad which offers the best of the band's spectral harmonies, woodsy storytelling and aching wisdom." Billboard premiered the Alan Tanner directed video for "Palindrome" on October 19, 2018. Billboard also premiered a new recording of "Hold on Love" from their 2003 record of the same name, which the band said "reflects the live version that we came to love playing through the years." KCRW premiered the video for the "hauntingly beautiful" "Last Summer In Omaha" on October 25, 2018.

== Track listing ==
All songs written by Azure Ray, except where otherwise listed.

1. "Palindrome"
2. "Last Summer In Omaha"
3. "Nightswimming" (R.E.M. cover)
4. "Hold On Love (2018 Version)"
5. "Palindrome (Reprise)"

== Personnel ==
- Additional appearances by Louis Schefano, Andy LeMaster, Tiffany Osborn
- Azure Ray and Louis Schefano – co-production
- Louis Schefano – engineer
- Andy LeMaster - mixing
- Doug Van Sloun - mastering
- Jess Ewald – cover photograph
- Ryan Dwyer – creative direction
