= Vs the Greatest of All Time =

Greatest of All Time

EP by Archers of Loaf
- Released: September 19, 1994
- Recorded: 1994
- Genre: Indie rock
- Length: 17:00
- Label: Alias

Archers of Loaf chronology
Icky Mettle (1993)	Greatest of All Time (1994)	Vee Vee (1995)

Archers of Loaf vs. the Greatest of All Time (often shortened to either Greatest of all Time or simply GOAT) is the first EP by North Carolina indie rock band Archers of Loaf. It was recorded shortly after their first album Icky Mettle, and the styles are very similar.

The cover art for the EP includes a photograph of former Toronto Maple Leafs star King Clancy.

== Reception ==
Robert Christgau gave the EP an A− grade, writing that the Archers of Loaf "...sound like a live band ready to service a living audience, their gleeful anger felt rather than assumed." When asked if this remark meant that the Archers of Loaf had fooled Christgau through their performance on the EP, the band's frontman Eric Bachmann told CMJ New Music Monthly, "Yeah...it probably just means we're good at it." In 2012, Pitchfork Media's Paul Thompson wrote that the EP ranked "among indie rock's finest short-players", describing it as "17 utterly riveting minutes of bloodletting."

Professional ratings
Review scores
Source	Rating
AllMusic	4/5 stars
Robert Christgau	A-

== Track list ==
All songs written by Eric Bachmann, Eric Johnson, Matt Gentling and Mark Price.

1. "Audiowhore"
2. "Lowest Part Is Free!"
3. "Freezing Point"
4. "Revenge"
5. "All Hail the Black Market"

"Freezing Point" and "Revenge" are also features on The Speed of Cattle LP.

The song "Greatest of all Time" was not featured on this release but rather their second full length, Vee Vee.
