= Canito =

Canito may refer to:

- Canito (footballer, born 1931) (1931–1998), full name Nicanor Sagarduy Gonzalo, Spanish footballer
- Canito (footballer, born 1956) (1956–2000), full name José Cano López, Spanish footballer
- Paco Cano (1912–2016), Spanish photojournalist
