= The Speed of Cattle =

Compilation album by Archers of Loaf
- Released: February 27, 1996
- Recorded: 1992–1995
- Studio: various
- Genre: Indie rock
- Length: 61:18
- Label: Alias

Archers of Loaf chronology
All the Nations Airports (1996)	The Speed of Cattle (1996)	Vitus Tinnitus (1997)

Professional ratings
Review scores
Source	Rating
AllMusic	2.5/5 stars
Christgau's Consumer Guide	A−
The New Rolling Stone Album Guide	3.5/5 stars

The Speed of Cattle is a compilation album recorded by the indie rock band Archers of Loaf. It is a collection of singles, rarities and radio sessions recorded in various locations between 1992 and 1995.

== Track listing ==
1. "Wrong" - 3:50
2. "South Carolina" - 3:33
3. "Web in Front" - 2:08
4. "Bathroom" - 1:45
5. "Tatyana" - 4:43
6. "What Did You Expect?" - 3:12
7. "Ethel Merman" - 2:42
8. "Funnelhead" - 2:51
9. "Quinn Beast" - 3:42
10. "Telepathic Traffic" - 3:04
11. "Don't Believe The Good News" - 4:49
12. "Smokin' Pot In The Hot City" - 3:17
13. "Mutes In The Steeple" - 2:06
14. "Revenge" - 2:47
15. "Bacteria" - 6:30
16. "Freezing Point" - 2:47
17. "Powerwalker" - 3:36
18. "Backwash" - 2:56
