= Web in Front =

Single by Archers of Loaf

from the album Icky Mettle
- Recorded: February 1993
- Genre: Indie rock; noise pop
- Label: Alias
- Songwriter(s): Eric Bachmann; Matt Gentling; Eric Johnson; Mark Price

Icky Mettle track listing
- 1. Web in Front; 2. Last Word; 3. Wrong; 4. You and Me; 5. Might; 6. Hate Paste; 7. Fat; 8. Plumb Line; 9. Learo, You're a Hole; 10. Sick File; 11. Toast; 12. Backwash; 13. Slow Worm

Web in Front is a song by American indie rock band Archers of Loaf, originally released as a 7" single on Alias Records in 1993. It was their first release on the Alias label, and their first single from their debut album Icky Mettle. The original single also included the tracks "Bathroom" and "Tatayana".

== Impact ==
"Web in Front" launched Icky Mettle to high-ranking positions on the college charts, including #18 on the CMJ New Music Report Top 150. The single was played regularly on both college radio and MTV, and its music video was featured in an episode of Beavis and Butthead. Additionally, the track was featured in the 1995 Kevin Smith film Mallrats.

== Critical reception ==
When "Web in Front" was originally released, music critics often compared it to Pavement and Superchunk. For example, Charles Aaron wrote in Spin that the song was "...a less fettered and more frolicsome rewrite of Pavement's "From Now On" (from Perfect Sound Forever). The New York Times' Neil Strauss described the song as frontman Eric Bachmann's "...own tongue-in-cheek version of a love song, and a perfect combination of weirdness with pop intuition."

=== Retrospective ===
In a review of Seconds Before the Accident, a 2000 Archers of Loaf live album, Pete Nicholson described "Web in Front" as a "pop classic". In 2012, Pitchfork Media's Matt LeMay wrote that "..."Web in Front" is quite simply among the finest indie rock songs ever written. That a song whose lyrics are all but impossible to parse literally comes off as so immediate and relatable speaks both to Bachmann's skill with words-as-sounds, and to his bandmates' ability to put force and nuance behind his voice." Also in 2012, Pitchfork's Paul Thompson wrote that the song "...isn't just their finest song, it's their defining moment, their rocket-shot into the canon."

Pitchfork ranked the song as the 77th best track of the 1990s in a 2010 list.

== Covers and samples ==
Punk rock band Alkaline Trio covered the song in 2010 for The A.V. Club's A.V. Undercover web series.

Chris Carrabba of the rock band Dashboard Confessional covered the song in 2011 for a Daytrotter session.
