= Crooked Fingers (album) =

Studio album by Crooked Fingers
- Released: 2000
- Genre: Indie rock
- Length: 44:27
- Label: Warm
- Producer: Eric Bachmann

Crooked Fingers chronology
Crooked Fingers (2000)	Bring On the Snakes (2001)

Crooked Fingers is the first studio album by the indie rock band Crooked Fingers. It was released in 2000 via Warm Records. The album was recorded by Eric Bachmann in Seattle, Washington, at Ft. Lawton and Denise Maupin's.

== Critical reception ==
Professional ratings
Review scores
Source	Rating
AllMusic	3/5 stars
Robert Christgau	(1-star Honorable Mention)
Pitchfork Media	8.4/10

The Edmonton Journal wrote that "Bachmann mixes a tint of twang with gruff vocals and dark lyrics... He's slightly more upbeat and articulate than Tom Waits, but not as nihilistic as Nick Cave."

== Track listing ==
1. "Crowned in Chrome" - 3:43
2. "New Drink for the Old Drunk" - 3:52
3. "Pigeon Kicker" - 3:18
4. "Man Who Died of Nothing at All" - 2:54
5. "Broken Man" - 6:31
6. "Black Black Ocean" - 4:29
7. "Juliette" - 4:39
8. "She Spread Her Legs and Flew Away" - 3:13
9. "Under Sad Stars" - 5:42
10. "Little Bleeding" - 6:06
