= Invisible Ones =

Studio album by Orenda Fink
- Released: August 23, 2005
- Genre: Indie rock, indie pop
- Label: Saddle Creek Records

Orenda Fink chronology
Invisible Ones (2005)	Ask the Night (2009)

Professional ratings
Review scores
Source	Rating
AllMusic	4/5 stars
Pitchfork	6.8/10
Paste	Favorable
Musical Discoveries	4/5 stars

Invisible Ones is the debut solo album by Orenda Fink of Azure Ray. It was released August 23, 2005, by Saddle Creek Records.

== Track listing ==
1. "Leave It All"
2. "Invisible Ones Guard the Gate"
3. "Bloodline"
4. "Blind Asylum"
5. "Les Invisibles"
6. "Miracle Worker"
7. "No Evolution"
8. "Dirty South"
9. "Easter Island"
10. "Animal"
11. "Invisible Ones" (short film)
12. "Bloodline" (multimedia track)
