= Paco Cano =

Spanish photojournalist (1912–2016)

Paco Cano Lorenza (18 December 1912 – 27 July 2016), also known as Canito, was a Spanish photojournalist from Valencia, who specialized in torero photography.

== Biography ==
Cano was born in Alicante, Spain, in the neighborhood of Goteta, on 18 December 1912. He was the son of Vicente Cano, who served as bullfighter with the nickname "Rejillas". His father set up a small business renting out chairs and awnings. Paco first caped a cow that had escaped from the slaughterhouse there. At 17 Cano tried his fortune as a boxer in the flyweight category. He then tried his hand in a bullfight in Alicante, as an espontáneo, or spontaneous bullfighter, and got sent to jail, but eventually had a debut alongside the novilleras, the Palmeño sisters. At a bullfight in Orihuela, Alicante, he suffered a goring.

During the war, Cano lived in Madrid, entering the world of photography as a laboratory assistant at a cosmetics factory while still working as a bullfighter. Being a "bullfighter-photographer" he had the advantage of knowing two techniques: how to capture the right moment, and how to use the camera. Cano decided to leave bullfighting and dedicate himself to photography. Among those matadors photographed are Domingo Ortega, Pepe Luis Vazquez, and Luis Miguel Dominguin. Later Cano worked with publications like ABC, Hierro, La Plaza, and Aplausos. He turned 100 in December 2012. He died on 27 July 2016 at the age of 103.

== Manolete ==
Cano was in Linares (Jaén), where he was the only photojournalist in Linares on the afternoon of matador Manolete's death in the ring. The images Cano took that afternoon and the next night went around the world. He earned little money for them, but Cano was forever known as the photographer of the death of Manolete. He photographed the shrouded corpse of the matador with the crucifix in his hands, and his girlfriend, Lupe Sino heartbroken. These images had great impact in the press, as most of the public only knew the Spanish bullfighter by his voice from the radio before these were published. Their story was later made into a film with Adrien Brody and Penélope Cruz, called Manolete.

Cano traveled from bullring to bullring to continue capturing snapshots of the bullfighting art that fascinated him so much. His career began at the age of 30, accumulating 69 years of profession.
