= Reason in Decline =

Studio album by Archers of Loaf
- Released: October 21, 2022
- Studios: Drop of Sun (Asheville, North Carolina)
- Genre: Indie rock
- Length: 35:17
- Label: Merge
- Producers: Archers of Loaf; Adam McDaniel

Archers of Loaf chronology
Curse of the Loaf (2015)	Reason in Decline (2022)

Reason in Decline is an album by the American band Archers of Loaf, released in 2022. It was their first album in 24 years. The band supported the album with a North American tour. The first single was "In the Surface Noise".

== Production ==
Eric Bachmann wrote many of the songs during the COVID lockdown. "Screaming Undercover" criticizes capitalism. "Aimee" is a tribute to a longtime relationship.

== Critical reception ==
Professional ratings
Review scores
Source	Rating
AllMusic	4/5 stars
Pitchfork	7.7/10
Record Collector	3/5 stars
Uncut	8/10

Pitchfork noted that "longtime fans may balk at how clean this record sounds, how guitars that once seemed to shed sparks as they ground against one another now lock into recognizable harmonies." The Tallahassee Democrat wrote that "Human" "stomps like the Loaf of old, with Bachmann's weathered baritone lifting if out of the mosh pit." The Chicago Reader opined that Reason in Decline feels "like the perfect progression from (and a de facto companion piece to) the matured songwriting on White Trash Heroes." AllMusic deemed the album "a brave, compelling, and surprisingly moving set of songs." Record Collector called it "twin-guitar-squealing, drum-thumping rock."

== Track listing ==
All tracks are written by Archers of Loaf.

Reason in Decline track listing
No.	Title	Length
1.	"Human"	2:58
2.	"Saturation and Light"	3:03
3.	"Screaming Undercover"	2:55
4.	"Mama Was a War Profiteer"	3:55
5.	"Aimee"	3:16
6.	"In the Surface Noise"	4:22
7.	"Breaking Even"	4:13
8.	"Misinformation Age"	2:27
9.	"The Moment You End"	2:55
10.	"War Is Wide Open"	5:13
Total length:		35:17

== Personnel ==
Archers of Loaf

- Eric Bachmann
- Matt Gentling
- Eric Johnson
- Mark Price

Additional musicians

- Alan Weatherhead – pedal steel (5), Mellotron (5)

Technical

- Archers of Loaf – production
- Adam McDaniel – production
- Alex Farrar – engineering, mixing, co-production
- Bob Weston – mastering

Art and design

- Daniel Murphy – design
- Kate Fix – band photo
