= White Trash Heroes =

Studio album by Archers of Loaf
- Released: September 22, 1998; August 7, 2012 (reissue)
- Recorded: 1998
- Genre: Indie rock
- Length: 41:27
- Label: Alias (original US release); Bandai (original Japanese Release); Merge (2012 US reissue); Fire (2012 UK reissue)

Archers of Loaf chronology
Vitus Tinnitus (1997)	White Trash Heroes (1998)	Seconds Before the Accident (2000)

Professional ratings
Review scores
Source	Rating
AllMusic	3/5 stars
The A.V. Club	A−
Christgau's Consumer Guide	A−
Drowned in Sound	8/10
The New Rolling Stone Album Guide	3/5 stars
NME	7/10
Pitchfork	7.3/10 / 8.0/10

White Trash Heroes is the fourth studio album from the indie rock band Archers of Loaf, released in 1998 by Alias Records. In 2012 the album was reissued by Merge Records on two CDs with new, re-imagined art by Casey Burns.

== Track listing ==
All songs written by Eric Bachmann, Eric Johnson, Matt Gentling and Mark Price.

1. "Fashion Bleeds" – 3:59
2. "Dead Red Eyes" – 4:03
3. "I.N.S." – 2:56
4. "Perfect Time" – 4:35
5. "Slick Tricks and Bright Lights" – 5:28
6. "One Slight Wrong Move" – 3:20
7. "Banging on a Dead Drum" – 3:12
8. "Smokers in Love" – 2:40
9. "After the Last Laugh" – 3:45
10. "White Trash Heroes" – 7:47

The Japanese release of this album includes the Vitus Tinnitus EP as bonus tracks.

== 2012 Reissue Bonus CD/downloads ==
1. "Jive Kata" - 3:38
2. "Fashion Bleeds (4-Track Demo)" – 4:10
3. "Dead Red Eyes (4-Track Demo)" – 3:51
4. "Slick Tricks and Bright Lights (4-Track Demo)" – 5:12
5. "One Slight Wrong Move (4-Track Demo)" – 3:35
6. "Banging on a Dead Drum (4-Track Demo)" – 2:49
7. "Smokers in Love (4-Track Demo)" – 2:35
8. "After the Last Laugh (4-Track Demo)" – 3:46
9. "White Trash Heroes (4-Track Demo)" – 5:03
10. "Untitled and Forgotten (4-Track Demo)" - 3:22
11. "Walk of Shame" - 2:58
12. "Untitled" - 1:40
13. "Whooh!" - 3:03

1 is from the band's 1997 fan club 7" single; 11-13 are unreleased B-sides.

== Personnel ==
- Eric Bachmann - vocals, guitar
- Matt Gentling - bass
- Eric Johnson - guitar
- Mark Price - drums
