= To the Races =

Studio album by Eric Bachmann
- Released: August 22, 2006
- Label: Saddle Creek

Professional ratings
Review scores
Source	Rating
AllMusic	3.5/5 stars
Pitchfork	6.9/10
Slant Magazine	4/5 stars

To the Races is an album by Eric Bachmann from the bands Crooked Fingers and Archers of Loaf. It was released on August 22, 2006.

It was recorded in a hotel room in North Carolina.

The album is the 95th release of Saddle Creek Records.

== Track listing ==
1. "Man O' War"
2. "Home"
3. "Carrboro Woman"
4. "Genivieve"
5. "Genie, Genie"
6. "Lonesome Warrior"
7. "To the Races"
8. "Liars and Thieves"
9. "Little Bird"
10. "So Long, Savannah"
