= Vee Vee =

Studio album by Archers of Loaf
- Released: March 6, 1995
- Recorded: Chicago, Illinois in August 1994
- Genre: Indie rock
- Length: 40:04
- Label: Alias
- Producer: Archers of Loaf, Bob Weston

Archers of Loaf chronology
Vs the Greatest of All Time (1994)	Vee Vee (1995)	All the Nations Airports (1996)

Vee Vee is the second studio album by the American indie rock band Archers of Loaf, released in March 1995 by Alias Records. The album received very positive reviews from critics.

== Recording and release ==
Vee Vee was recorded in Chicago, Illinois, in August 1994 and produced by the band and Bob Weston. It was released in March 1995 by the independent record label Alias Records. "Harnessed in Slums" was released as the album's single, and it got considerable airplay on college and alternative rock radio stations. A 2-disc reissue of the album, containing several rarities, demos, and B-sides, was released on February 21, 2012, by Merge Records.

== Critical reception ==
Professional ratings
Review scores
Source	Rating
AllMusic	4.5/5 stars
The Boston Phoenix	4/4 stars
Chicago Tribune	3/4 stars
Christgau's Consumer Guide	A
Consequence of Sound	4.5/5 stars
Pitchfork	8.4/10
Q	3/5 stars
Record Collector	4/5 stars
Rolling Stone	4/5 stars
Spin	8/10

Vee Vee received very positive reviews from critics. Writing for Spin, Natasha Stovall praised Eric Bachmann's honest singing, stating that his "hoary, nasal desperation embodies Vee Vee's subtle mix of motivations." In a retrospective review, Gregory Heaney of AllMusic said that the album "found Archers of Loaf proving time and time again that what really matters in music is heart, sweat, and grit, and that if you have those on your side, everything else just kind of falls into place."

== Track listing ==
All songs written by Archers of Loaf, except where noted.

1. "Step into the Light" (Mark Griffiths) – 4:22
2. "Harnessed in Slums" – 3:16
3. "Nevermind the Enemy" – 2:31
4. "Greatest of All Time" – 3:51
5. "Underdogs of Nipomo" – 3:31
6. "Floating Friends" – 3:48
7. "1985" – 0:52
8. "Fabricoh" – 3:05
9. "Nostalgia" – 1:18
10. "Let the Loser Melt" – 3:32
11. "Death in the Park" – 3:30
12. "The Worst Has Yet to Come" – 2:50
13. "Underachievers March and Fight Song" – 3:03
14. "Freezing Point" — 2:36 (Japanese bonus track)

== Personnel ==
- Eric Bachmann – vocals, guitar
- Matt Gentling – bass
- Eric Johnson – guitar
- Mark Price – drums
- Bob Weston – engineer
