= Icky Mettle =

Studio album by Archers of Loaf
- Released: 1993
- Recorded: 1993
- Genre: Indie rock
- Length: 38:02
- Label: Alias
- Producer: Caleb Southern

Archers of Loaf chronology
Icky Mettle (1993)	Vs the Greatest of All Time (1994)

Icky Mettle is the debut studio album recorded by the indie rock band Archers of Loaf. It was produced and engineered by Caleb Southern at Kraptone Studios in Chapel Hill, North Carolina, and released by Alias Records in 1993. A deluxe reissue of the album was released by Merge Records in 2011.

The album was recorded and mixed in seven days. According to Eric Bachmann, "We spent like $5,000 to make it."

== Reception ==
Professional ratings
Review scores
Source	Rating
AllMusic	4.5/5 stars
The A.V. Club	A−
Christgau's Consumer Guide	A
Entertainment Weekly	A
The Guardian	5/5 stars
NME	7/10
Pitchfork	9.0/10
Record Collector	5/5 stars
Rolling Stone	4.5/5 stars
Spin	8/10

Icky Mettle received generally positive reviews. Interview declared it the "Best Indie Rock Album of the Year". The Gazette listed it among the top 10 albums of 1993.

== Legacy ==
Icky Mettle ranked number 32 in Pitchfork's original Top 100 Albums of the 1990s list, and Blender ranked it at number 56 in their 100 Greatest Indie-Rock Albums Ever list. In a retrospective review, Spin's Mike Powell describes it as "an album of boyish fits and noisy guitar flurries. It's indie rock as hearty and art-free as oatmeal, before the line separating it from the mainstream dissolved, before it became so... eclectic."

In a 2005 interview with The Triangle, Eric Bachmann reflected on the album: "When we first came out we had that energy. It's a weird thing that you can't put your finger on... I listened to Icky Mettle, and I almost cringe when I hear it. But what the people probably liked when they heard that record was the energy we were putting out."

In 2011, Chris Carrabba of Dashboard Confessional covered "Web in Front" on his album Covered in the Flood.

== Track listing ==
All songs written by Eric Bachmann, Eric Johnson, Matt Gentling and Mark Price.

1. "Web in Front" – 2:09
2. "Last Word" – 3:35
3. "Wrong" – 3:40
4. "You and Me" – 3:10
5. "Might" – 2:04
6. "Hate Paste" – 2:46
7. "Fat" – 1:19
8. "Plumb Line" – 2:09
9. "Learo, You're a Hole" – 3:51
10. "Sick File" – 1:42
11. "Toast" – 4:38
12. "Backwash" – 3:27
13. "Slow Worm" – 3:32
14. "Audiowhore" — Japanese bonus track
15. "Lowest Part Is Free" — Japanese bonus track

== Personnel ==
- Eric Bachmann – vocals, guitar
- Matt Gentling – bass
- Eric Johnson – guitar
- Mark Price – drums

== Notes ==
1. Brown, Liz. "ROCK REVIEW: Archers Revolution". WWeek.com. Archived from the original on February 27, 2005.
