= Set the Woods on Fire =

Studio album by Art in Manila
- Released: August 7, 2007
- Genre: Indie rock
- Label: Saddle Creek

Professional ratings
Review scores
Source	Rating
AllMusic	3.5/5 stars
Pitchfork	5.4/10

Set the Woods on Fire is a studio album by indie rock band Art in Manila. It was released in 2007 via Saddle Creek Records.

== Critical reception ==
AllMusic wrote that "these are thoughtful tracks, carefully developed and arranged by [Orenda] Fink and her collaborators, and while the themes are generally weighty, the singer's voice -- good, but not extraordinary, with clean higher tones that can take on a rougher edge when she moves down the register -- alongside her distinct sense of melody, keep them from sinking into despair or longing or over-dramatics." PopMatters wrote that "the songwriting is rather good, juxtaposing achingly pretty melodies against abrasive, rock-centric beats." Spin praised the album bookends as "pieces of gorgeous sorrow."

== Track listing ==
1. "Time Gets Us All"
2. "Our Addictions"
3. "The Abomination"
4. "I Thought I Was Free"
5. "Set the Woods on Fire"
6. "Golden Dawn"
7. "Anything You Love"
8. "The Sweat Descends" (Les Savy Fav)
9. "Spirit, Run"
10. "Precious Pearl"
11. "The Game"

== Musicians ==
- Orenda Fink
- Adrianne Verhoeven
- Steve Bartolomei
- Dan McCarthy
- Ryan Fox
- Corey Broman
- Joel Peterson – Engineer, Mixing
- Andy LeMaster – Mixing
- Doug Van Sloun – Mastering
