= Azure Ray =

American dream pop duo

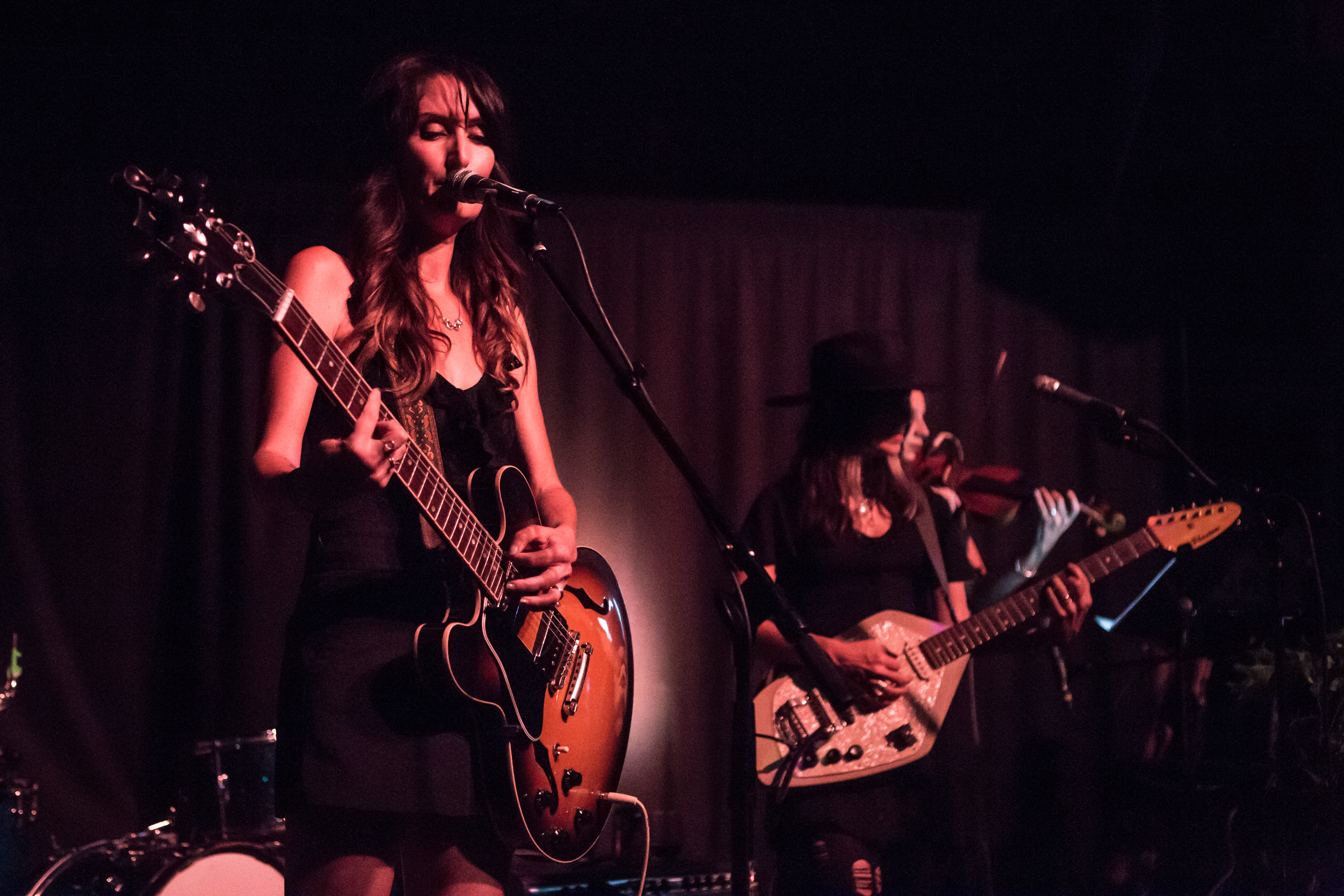
- Azure Ray live in Los Angeles, California in 2019. Photo by Veronika Reinert.

Background information
- Origin: Athens, Georgia, United States
- Genres: Dream pop, indie pop, indie rock
- Years active: 2001–2004; 2008–present
- Labels: Saddle Creek; Flower Moon Records; WARM Electronic Recordings
- Members: Maria Taylor; Orenda Fink
- Website: www.azureraymusic.com

Azure Ray is an American dream pop duo, consisting of musicians Orenda Fink and Maria Taylor. Formed in Athens, Georgia, in 2001, they later moved to Omaha, Nebraska, and became part of the Saddle Creek Records music scene, which also included Bright Eyes, The Faint, and Cursive. Azure Ray's music has often been featured in film and television, including Six Feet Under, Grey's Anatomy, and The Devil Wears Prada. They have released five albums and several EPs.

== Biography ==
=== Formation ===
The pair met while attending the Alabama School of Fine Arts in Birmingham. They fronted a band called Little Red Rocket, which released two albums, Who Did You Pay (1997, Tim/Kerr) and It's in the Sound (2000, Monolyth Record Group), which earned them frequent comparisons to Veruca Salt. For the first album, the duo co-wrote with the band's drummer Louis Schefano who would become a frequent collaborator.

After the band broke up, Fink and Taylor moved to Athens, Georgia, and eventually formed Azure Ray. "My boyfriend had just died and we had written all of these songs that were helping us cope with everything. We had a night where all of our friends and family got together. We played those songs, which later would turn into the songs on our first Azure Ray record..." said Taylor.

=== Azure Ray (2001) ===
The pair signed to the Warm Electronic Recordings label and released their self-titled debut in 2001, produced by Eric Bachmann (Crooked Fingers and Archers of Loaf). Pitchfork praised the album, giving it a 7 out of 10, describing it as a collection of "maudlin but beautiful, expertly crafted pop songs". The song "Sleep" was later featured in the 2006 Academy Award-nominated movie The Devil Wears Prada. In February 2015, Taylor Swift included "Sleep" on a six-song "breakup playlist" made for a fan via her official Tumblr. DJ Paul Kalkbrenner also sampled "Rise" in his 2008 song "Azure".

=== Burn and Shiver and November EP (2002) ===
Azure Ray's second album, Burn and Shiver, was released in 2002, again produced by Bachmann. With Burn and Shiver, Pitchfork said the duo had "come closer than ever to wielding an emotional potency like master Cohen's". After meeting Fink and Taylor in Athens, Bright Eyes frontman Conor Oberst invited the band on tour and introduced them to the people at Saddle Creek, the label to which he was signed. They relocated to Omaha, Nebraska, and joined the music scene there. The November EP was released on January 22, 2002, and was the band's first for Saddle Creek.

The duo collaborated with Moby and co-wrote the songs "Great Escape" (on his album 18) and "Landing" (which appeared on the XXX soundtrack), and afterwards joined him on tour.

=== Hold On Love (2003), New Resolution EP (2004) and hiatus ===
Hold On Love was the band's third full-length, released October 7, 2003, on Saddle Creek. Pitchfork called it a departure from their previous records, with "newly arresting manipulations of electronic elements interlock[ing] with the duo's traditional organic fare, as well as bolder and sharper production". The first single from this album, New Resolution, was released as an EP/Single by Saddle Creek on January 20, 2004. Azure Ray went on hiatus in 2004, leaving Fink and Taylor to work on solo albums and other collaborative projects, including a stint in Now It's Overhead.

=== Reunion and Drawing Down the Moon (2010) ===
Fink and Taylor reformed the band for a one-off show in Los Angeles at the iconic Troubadour on November 30, 2008, accompanied by Andy LeMaster of Now It's Overhead and Nick White of Tilly and the Wall. In 2009, Taylor announced on KCRW's Morning Becomes Eclectic that the duo had reformed on a semi-permanent basis, with the intention of playing "five or six" shows before working on a new Azure Ray album. Their fourth album, Drawing Down the Moon, was released in September 2010. On August 4, 2010, Stereogum premiered the first song from the album, "Don't Leave My Mind"; they later premiered the video, directed by Ryan Berg, on September 30. Pitchfork said the new album "sounds warmly familiar, a reminder of why we missed them in the first place", while a reviewer for the BBC called it "a warming blanket of an album, here for you to wrap up in". On January 25, 2011, Azure Ray released a new single from the recording sessions, titled "Silverlake", recorded with Mark Linkous of Sparklehorse.

=== As Above, So Below EP (2012) ===
Azure Ray's next release, a six-song EP entitled As Above So Below, came out on Saddle Creek on September 5, 2012. After a two-year hiatus following the release of Drawing Down the Moon, Fink and a pregnant Taylor entered the studio to record six news songs with a more "hypnotic" "electronica" influence in collaboration with Andy LeMaster and Todd Fink. On July 17, Stereogum premiered "Scattered Like Leaves", calling it a "starry, shivering cut", while NPR premiered "Red Balloon" on August 9, describing it as a "long, slow summer swoon" with "devastating melancholy". Rolling Stone premiered the full EP stream on August 28.

=== Reunion and Waves EP (2018) ===
In October 2017, after another hiatus, it was announced that Azure Ray's self-titled debut and Burn and Shiver were now newly available through Taylor's own label, Flower Moon Records. The next month, the duo announced they would once again reunite for a one-off show in Los Angeles at the Lodge Room on January 20, 2018.

On September 26, 2018, Stereogum announced the first new Azure Ray record in six years, an EP titled Waves, and premiered a new single, "Palindrome", praising it as a "mournful string-driven ballad which offers the best of the band's spectral harmonies, woodsy storytelling and aching wisdom". Billboard premiered the video for "Palindrome", directed by Alan Tanner, on October 19, along with a new recording of "Hold On Love" (from their 2003 record of the same name), which the band said "reflects the live version that we came to love playing through the years". KCRW premiered the video for the "hauntingly beautiful" "Last Summer in Omaha" on October 25, the day before the EP was released on Flower Moon.

2021 saw the release of Remedy, their first new album in 11 years. Recently, the band has begun to re-release their back catalogue via their own label Flower Moon.

== Other projects ==
Fink and Taylor have both recorded and released numerous solo albums, and have performed as part of Now It's Overhead. They have also appeared together on numerous Bright Eyes records, as well as others by Moby, Cursive, Two Gallants, and Georgie James. Fink is also a member of Art in Manila, O+S, Harouki Zombi, Closeness, and High Up, and has played with or appeared as a guest on records by The Faint, Pete Yorn, Old Canes, and others. Taylor has recorded or performed with Ben Lee, Joshua Radin, Nik Freitas, and others.

== Discography ==
=== Albums ===
- Azure Ray (Warm Electronic Recordings, 2001)
- Burn and Shiver (Warm, 2002)
- Hold On Love (Saddle Creek Records, 2003)
- Drawing Down the Moon (Saddle Creek, 2010)
- Remedy (Flower Moon, 2021)

=== Singles and EPs ===
- "Sleep" (Rubber Records, 2002)
- November (Saddle Creek, 2002)
- "The Drinks We Drank Last Night" (Saddle Creek, 2003)
- "New Resolution" (Saddle Creek, 2004)
- "Don't Leave My Mind" (Saddle Creek, 2010)
- "Silverlake" (Saddle Creek, 2011)
- As Above So Below (Saddle Creek, 2012)
- Waves (Flower Moon Records, 2018)
