= Dignity and Shame =

Studio album by Crooked Fingers
- Released: February 22, 2005
- Genre: Indie rock
- Length: 50:02
- Label: Merge
- Producers: Eric Bachmann; Martin Feveyear

Crooked Fingers chronology
Red Devil Dawn (2003)	Dignity and Shame (2005)	Forfeit/Fortune (2008)

Professional ratings
Review scores
Source	Rating
AllMusic	3/5 stars
No Ripcord	9/10
PopMatters	8/10
Stylus Magazine	B

Dignity and Shame is the fourth album recorded by the indie rock band Crooked Fingers. This album was chosen as one of Amazon.com's Top 100 Editor's Picks of 2005. It has been billed as a concept album based on the lives of bullfighter Manolete and Spanish actress Lupe Sino. Lara Meyerratken is featured on lead vocals on four songs.

American indie-rock band The National and St. Vincent covered "Sleep All Summer" for the album SCORE! 20 Years of Merge Records. Singer Eric Bachmann collaborated with singer/songwriter Neko Case on a cover of "Sleep All Summer" for her album Hell-On.

== Track listing ==
1. "Islero" - 3:29
2. "Weary Arms" - 2:29
3. "Call to Love" - 3:25
4. "Twilight Creeps" - 5:41
5. "Destroyer" - 5:18
6. "You Must Build a Fire" - 5:38
7. "Valerie" - 3:18
8. "Andalucia" - 2:51
9. "Sleep All Summer" - 4:42
10. "Coldways" - 3:39
11. "Wrecking Ball" - 4:20
12. "Dignity and Shame" - 5:12

The vinyl version of the album includes two bonus tracks:

1. "The Ballad of El Cuchillo"
2. "New Drink for the Old Drunk"
