= Burn and Shiver =

Studio album by Azure Ray
- Released: April 9, 2002
- Recorded: November 2001; Athens, Georgia
- Genre: Indie rock
- Length: 42:13
- Label: WARM
- Producer: Eric Bachmann

Azure Ray chronology
Azure Ray (2001)	Burn and Shiver (2002)	Hold on Love (2003)

Professional ratings
Aggregate scores
Source	Rating
Metacritic	(70/100)
Review scores
Source	Rating
Allmusic	4/5 stars
Pitchfork	(6.8/10)

Burn and Shiver is the third release by Azure Ray (and second full-length album), released by WARM in 2002.

== Track listing ==
All tracks by Azure Ray

1. "Favorite Cities" – 3:44
2. "The New Year" – 3:44
3. "Seven Days" – 3:35
4. "Home" – 3:13
5. "How You Remember" – 4:14
6. "Trees Keep Growing" – 3:16
7. "A Thousand Years" – 2:39
8. "Your Weak Hands" – 4:57
9. "While I'm Still Young" – 3:14
10. "We Exchanged Words" – 2:45
11. "Raining in Athens" – 4:10
12. "Rest Your Eyes" – 2:39

== Personnel ==
- Eric Bachmann – Arranger, Multi Instruments, Producer, Mixing, Audio Enhancement
- David Barbe – Mixing
- Chris Bilheimer – Art Direction
- Brian Causey – Art Direction
- Jacqueline Ferguson – Piano
- Orenda Fink – Guitar, Trumpet, Keyboards, Vocals, Melodica
- John Golden – Mastering
- Lou Kregel – Illustrations
- Alex McManus – Trombone, Euphonium
- Maria Taylor – Guitar, Piano, Keyboards, Vocals
