= Manolete =

Spanish bullfighter (1917–1947)

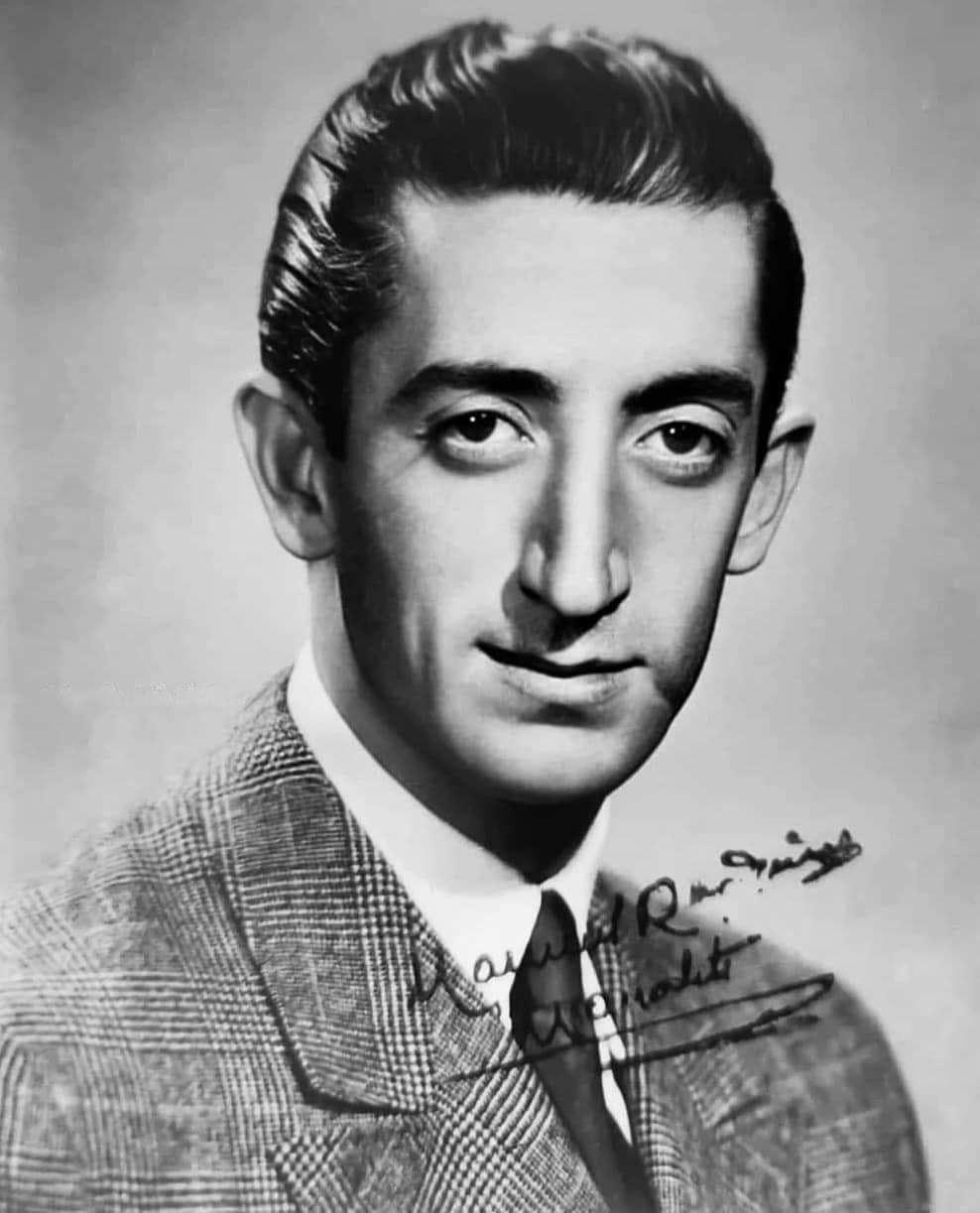

Personal information
- Nationality: Spanish
- Born: Manuel Laureano Rodríguez Sánchez; 4 July 1917 Córdoba, Andalucia, Kingdom of Spain
- Died: 29 August 1947 (aged 30) Linares, Andalucía, Kingdom of Spain

Sport
- Sport: Bullfighting
- Position: Matador
- Partner: Lupe Sino

Manuel Laureano Rodríguez Sánchez (4 July 1917 – 29 August 1947), known as Manolete, was a Spanish bullfighter.

== Career ==
Manuel Laureano Rodríguez Sánchez was the son of a bullfighter (who also went by the name Manolete) and his wife Angustias. His father died when Manolete was five years old. Rising to prominence shortly after the Spanish Civil War, Manolete went on to be considered one of the greatest bullfighters of all time. His style was sober and serious, with few concessions to the gallery, and he excelled at the suerte de la muerte; the kill. Manolete's contribution to bullfighting included being able to stand very still while the bull passed close to his body and, rather than giving the passes separately, remaining in one spot and linking four or five consecutive passes into a compact series. He popularized the "Manoletina": a pass with the muleta normally given just before entering to kill with the sword.

In addition to appearing in all of the major bullrings of Spain, Manolete had important triumphs in Plaza Mexico.

== Death ==
Manolete died on 29 August 1947, following a fatal goring that occurred in his appearance alongside the up-and-coming matador Luis Miguel Dominguín in the town of Linares. As he killed the fifth bull of the day, the Miura bull Islero, Manolete was gored in his right thigh, in an event that left Spain in a state of shock. The cause of his death has not been fully determined, and some believe that he died after receiving a transfusion with the wrong type of blood.

== In popular culture ==
- The George A. Romero film Land of the Dead featured a character named Manolete, who was named after the bullfighter.
- Crooked Fingers' 2005 album Dignity and Shame is loosely based in part on the life of Manolete.
- "Death of Manolete" is a 10,000 Maniacs song from the 1983 album Secrets of the I Ching.
- Manolete was cited as the greatest bullfighter in the Twilight Zone episode, "A Game of Pool."
- Salvador Dalí portrays Manolete in his double-image painting, The Hallucinogenic Toreador, 1969, Salvador Dalí Museum, St. Petersburg, FL
- A song called "The Great Manolete" (to the tune of "La Virgen De La Macarena") appears on the album Herb Alpert's Tijuana Brass, Volume 2 (A&M, 1962).
- Vanessa Paradis recorded the song Manolo Manolete about him.
- The Death of Manolete was an entry in the television series Playhouse 90 starring Jack Palance in the titular role and directed by John Frankenheimer in 1957.
- Adrien Brody played Manolete in Manolete (2008). Omar Muñoz played a young Manolete.
- In The Blacklist season 10 episode "The Sicilian Error of Color", Reddington returns from Mexico with the horns of the bull named Islero which "killed Manolete". In the series final episode he brings the skull back to Spain 'where it belongs' after which he faces death the same way as Manolete.
- He is mentioned in RKO 281.

== See also ==
- Torero (film)

== Gallery ==
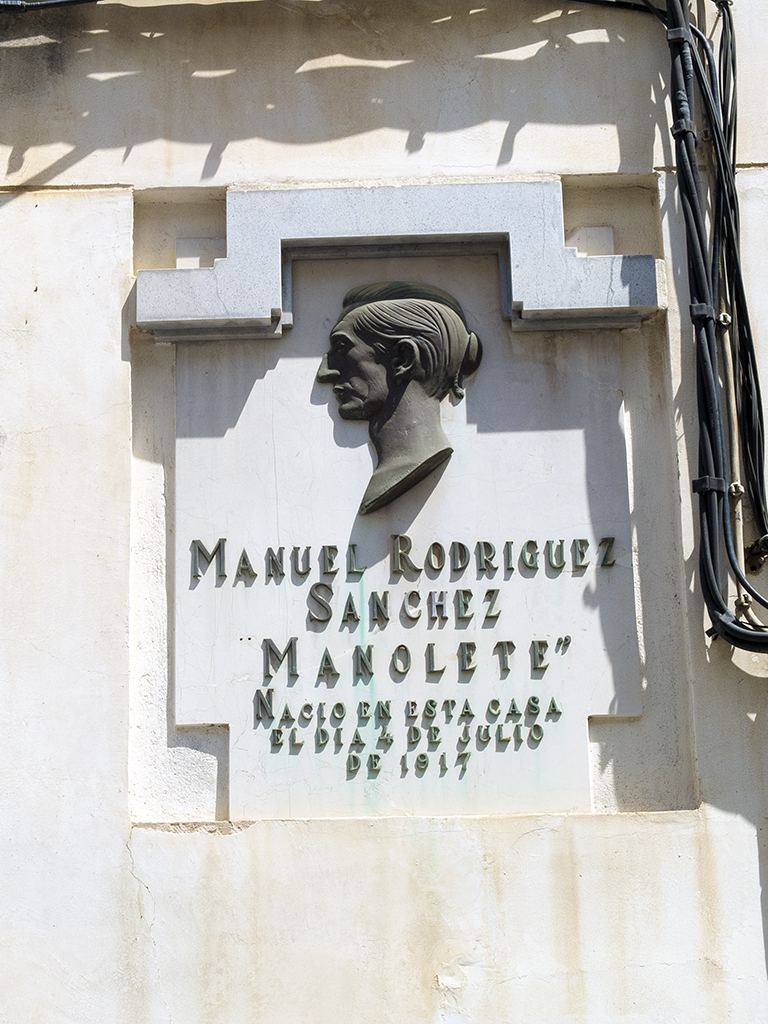
Plaque commemorating his birthplace

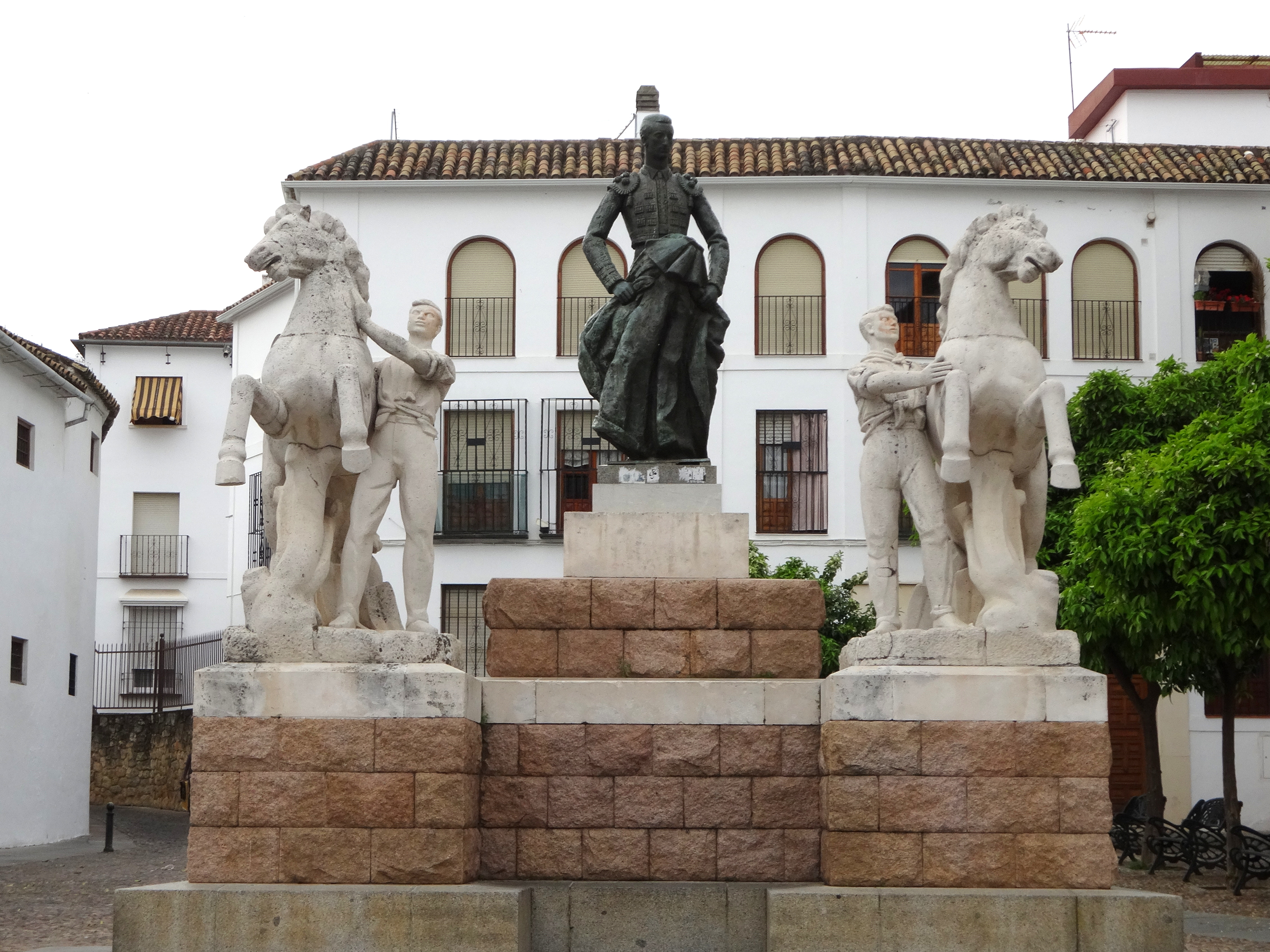
Manolete in his home town of Córdoba (Spain)

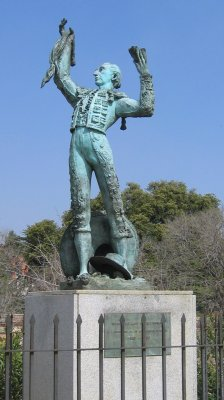
Manolete monument in Madrid (Luis Sanguino)

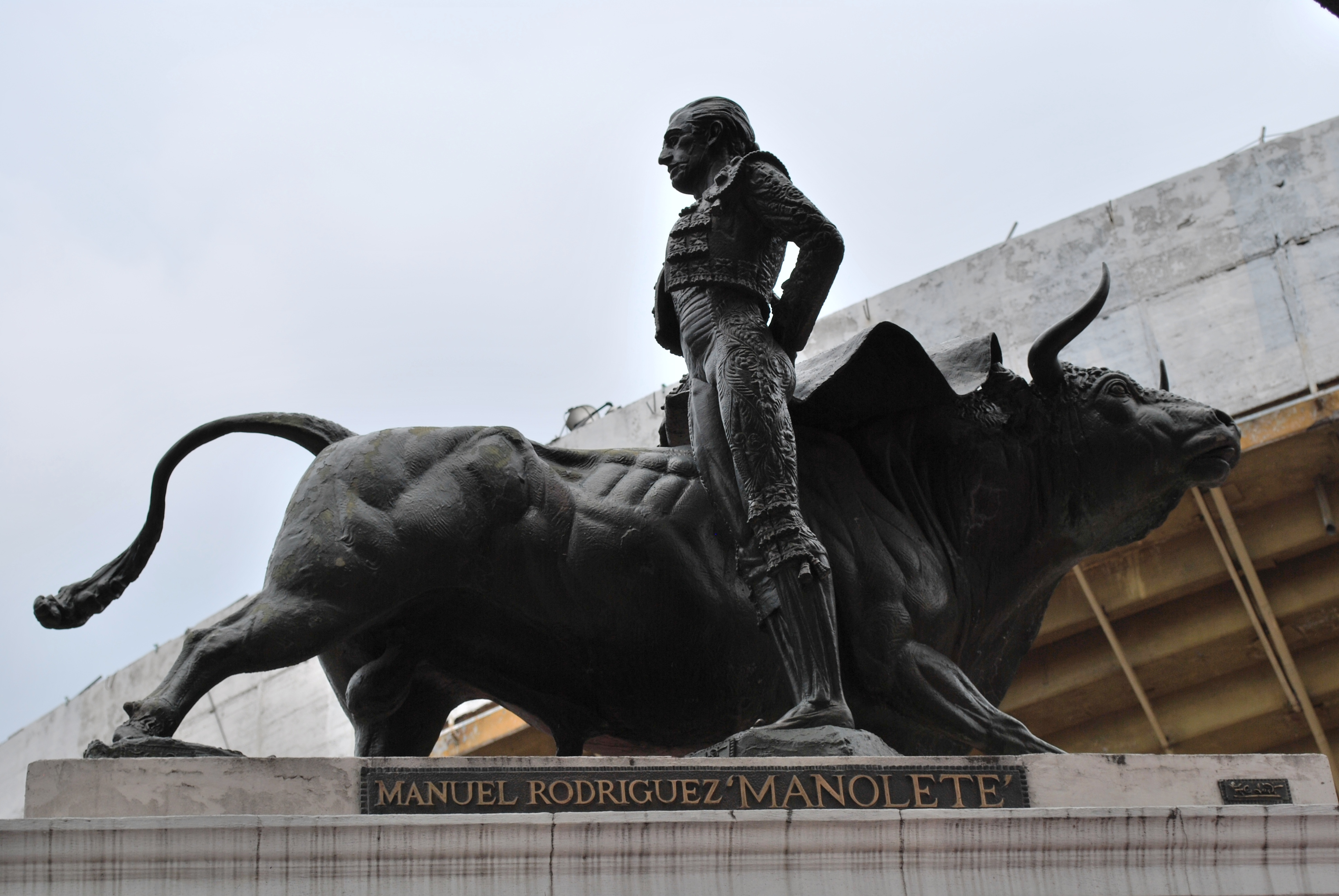
Statue of Manolete in outside the bullring in Mexico City

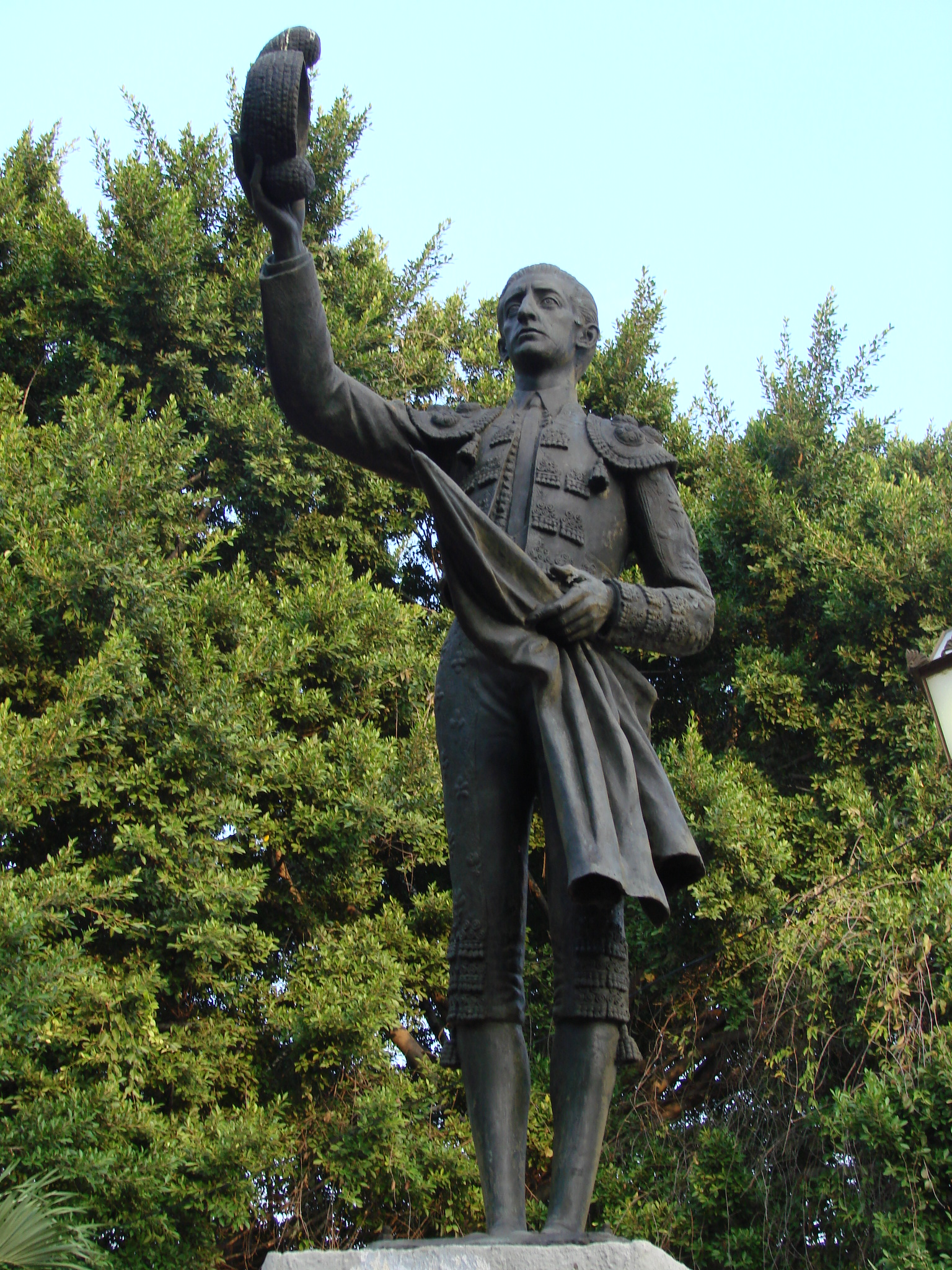
Manolete in Venezuela

== Publications ==
- Barnaby Conrad, The Death of Manolete, Phoenix Books, 2007. ISBN 1-59777-548-7

Barnaby Conrad also wrote, and narrated, an LP recording in 1957: "The Day Manolete Was Killed."
