= Seconds Before the Accident =

Seconds Before The Accident

Live album by Archers of Loaf
- Released: June 6, 2000
- Recorded: November, 1998
- Genre: Alternative rock, indie rock
- Label: Alias Records A-143
- Producer: Ian Schreier

Archers of Loaf chronology
White Trash Heroes (1998)	Seconds Before The Accident (2000)	Curse of the Loaf (2015)

Seconds Before The Accident is a live album by the alternative rock band Archers of Loaf released in 2000. It was the band's last release until Curse of the Loaf, another live album released in 2015.

== Album History ==
Seconds Before The Accident was recorded in November 1998 at the Cat's Cradle in Chapel Hill, North Carolina. In the liner notes it says, "...songs selected by band based on listenability." The album was recorded during the band's final tour which supported their last studio album White Trash Heroes, but was not released until two years later in 2000. It is not known if all the songs are from the same show, or in the original order played at the actual show, because the show date is not stated.

== Reception ==
Professional ratings
Review scores
Source	Rating
AllMusic	3/5 stars
The New Rolling Stone Album Guide	3/5 stars
Pitchfork	7.0/10

Pitchfork gave the album 7.0 (out of 10), stating "to fans, this will prove a fitting swansong, and excellent documentation for an experience lost to another time."

== Track listing ==
1. "Dead Red Eyes"
2. "Fabricoh"
3. "Vocal Shrapnel"
4. "Web in Front"
5. "Let The Loser Melt"
6. "Strangled by the Stereo Wire"
7. "Fashion Bleeds"
8. "You and Me"
9. "Might"
10. "Revenge"
11. "South Carolina"
12. "Lowest Part Is Free"
13. "Plumbline"
14. "Wrong"
15. "White Trash Heroes"
16. "Chumming the Oceans"
