= All the Nations Airports =

Studio album by Archers of Loaf
- Released: September 24, 1996; August 7, 2012 (reissue)
- Recorded: March – April 1996
- Studio: Ironwood, Seattle, WA,
- Genre: Indie rock
- Length: 47:51
- Label: Elektra (original US CD release); Alias (original US LP release); Merge (2012 US reissue); Fire (2012 UK reissue)
- Producer: Archers of Loaf, Brian Paulson

Archers of Loaf chronology
Vee Vee (1995)	All the Nations Airports (1996)	The Speed of Cattle (1996)

Professional ratings
Review scores
Source	Rating
AllMusic	3.5/5 stars
The A.V. Club	A−
Drowned in Sound	8/10
Pitchfork	7.5/10 / 7.6/10
The Record	3/5 stars
The Rolling Stone Album Guide	3.5/5 stars
Spin	7/10
The Village Voice	A−

All the Nations Airports is the third studio album recorded by the indie rock band Archers of Loaf. Although the band was still signed to Alias Records the album was released by Elektra Records in 1996, making it the first to be distributed by a major label.

== Track listing ==
All tracks are written by Archers of Loaf.

All the Nations Airports track listing
No.	Title	Length
1.	"Strangled by the Stereo Wire"	1:48
2.	"All the Nations Airports"	2:51
3.	"Scenic Pastures"	3:20
4.	"Worst Defense"	1:48
5.	"Attack of the Killer Bees"	2:58
6.	"Rental Sting"	2:39
7.	"Assassination on X-Mas Eve"	3:40
8.	"Chumming the Ocean"	5:05
9.	"Vocal Shrapnel"	2:43
10.	"Bones of Her Hands"	1:59
11.	"Bumpo"	3:04
12.	"Form and File"	3:01
13.	"Acromegaly"	3:52
14.	"Distance Comes in Droves"	5:29
15.	"Bombs Away"	2:26
16.	"Density" (Japanese bonus track)	2:06
Total length:		46:43

== Personnel ==
- Eric Bachmann – vocals, guitar
- Matt Gentling – bass
- Eric Johnson – guitar
- Mark Price – drums
