= Man O' War Bay =

Man O' War Bay or Man of War Bay may refer to:

- Man of War Bay, Abaco Islands, Bahamas, a bay on the Abaco Islands, Bahamas
- Man O' War Bay, Cameroon, a bay near Limbe, Cameroon
- Man O' War Bay, Great Tobago, a bay on Great Tobago, British Virgin Islands
- Man O' War Bay, New Zealand, a beach on Waiheke Island, New Zealand
- Man-o-War Bay, Tobago, a bay at the north-eastern tip of Tobago
- Man of War Bay, a bay on the Dorset coast in southern England

== See also ==
- Man O' War (disambiguation)
