= Eric Bachmann =

American musician/producer

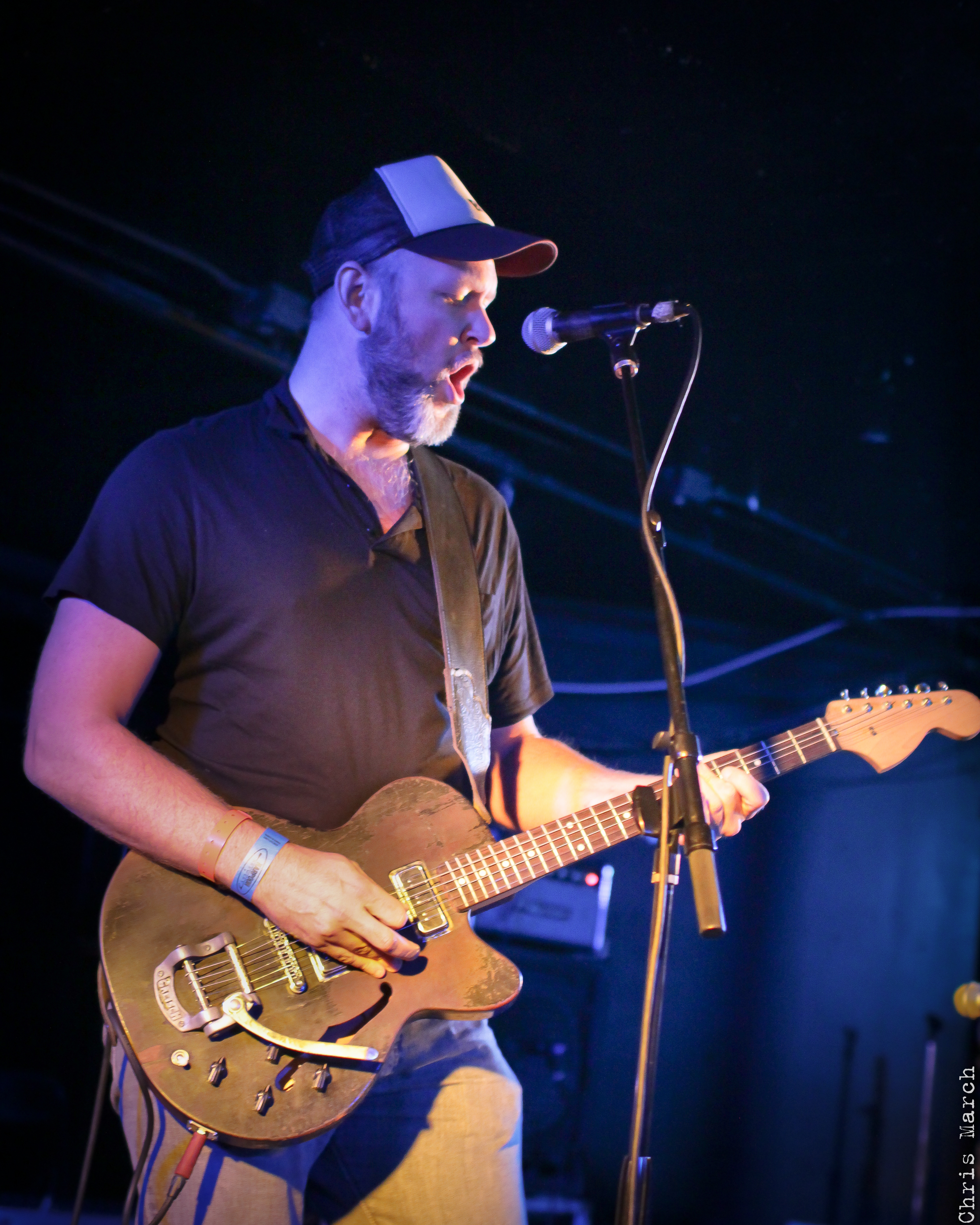
- Bachmann in 2012

Background information
- Also known as: Barry Black
- Born: April 28, 1970 (age 56); Greensboro, North Carolina, U.S.
- Occupation: Musician/producer
- Label: Merge Records
- Member of: Archers of Loaf; Crooked Fingers

Eric Emil Bachmann is an American multi-instrumentalist, songwriter, and producer. He rose to prominence as the frontman of Archers of Loaf and Crooked Fingers. Originally a saxophone major at Appalachian State University, Bachmann's music is distinctive for its creative and innovative arrangements. In addition to the guitar, he plays the piano and banjo regularly on tour. He was born in Greensboro, North Carolina, and grew up throughout the Southern United States. He currently lives in Athens, Georgia.

== Musical career ==
=== Archers of Loaf (1991–1998) ===
In 1991, Bachmann joined forces with guitarist Eric Johnson, bassist Matt Gentling, and drummer Mark Price to form Archers of Loaf. All originally from Asheville, North Carolina, the band is associated with the influential 1990s Chapel Hill independent rock scene alongside Superchunk and Polvo.

The band signed with Alias Records and released their debut full-length album, Icky Mettle (1993), the EP Vs the Greatest of All Time (1994), and the full-length Vee Vee (1995). Their third studio album, All the Nations Airports (1996), distributed by a major label, Elektra Records, was viewed as more accessible than their previous releases. Their final LP before the reunion, White Trash Heroes (1998), brought an intentionally different sound than the first three records to mixed reception. The years of extensive touring had taken their toll on the band, though, and in late 1998, the Archers disbanded.

=== Crooked Fingers (2000–2016) ===
Following the breakup of Archers of Loaf, Bachmann formed Crooked Fingers. Taking the name from his grandfather's CB radio handle, the band's sound varied between records as he further pushed his musical exploration. The lineup frequently rotated, with Bachmann the only consistent.

Crooked Fingers’ self-titled release, also referred to as the “swan record” based on the cover art, was released by WARM Records in 2000. A second album on WARM, Bring on the Snakes, came out in 2001. Crooked Fingers signed to Merge Records and released an EP of covers, Reservoir Songs (2002), and the full-length albums Red Devil Dawn (2003) and Dignity and Shame (2005). Forfeit/Fortune (2008) was self-released. Breaks in the Armor (2011) returned the band to Merge.

Merge re-released the first two Crooked Fingers records in January 2016, including numerous demos alongside the albums. This re-release, however, coincided with Bachmann's retiring of the moniker and was marked by two shows in NYC and Durham, NC, where he played the two albums in their entirety with string musicians.

=== Archers of Loaf reunion (2011–present) ===
In January 2011, Archers of Loaf reunited for an unannounced set at the Cat's Cradle in Carrboro, North Carolina, opening for local act the Love Language. They played numerous shows throughout the rest of 2011 and 2012, coinciding with Merge's rerelease of their back catalog. The band toured again in 2015. In February 2020, the band digitally released "Raleigh Days," their first new music since 1998. A 2020 tour was cut short due to the coronavirus pandemic.

The band's first full record in nearly 25 years, Reason in Decline, was released in October 2022. East Coast tour dates in support of the new record are scheduled for November and December 2022, with Midwest and West Coast tours happening in 2023.

=== Solo (1995–present) ===
In between Archers records, Bachmann pursued expansive instrumental experiments that defied the indie rock genre. He made two albums under the moniker Barry Black, 1995's self-titled and 1997's Tragic Animal Stories. Featuring collaborators such as Caleb Southern and Ben Folds, the Barry Black releases challenged any notion of pigeonholing him as solely a rock musician.

His first solo effort under his own name, the instrumental and atmospheric Short Careers, was recorded as a score for the film Ball of Wax and released in 2002.

Saddle Creek Records released his second, To the Races (2006). Self-recorded over five days while at the Outer Banks, the record is primarily Bachmann completely solo but features contributions from Miranda Brown (backing vocals) and DeVotchKa's Tom Hagerman (violin).

On March 25, 2016, shortly after retiring the band Crooked Fingers, Bachmann released his third solo album, the eponymous Eric Bachmann. On September 7, 2018, he released No Recover and embarked on a tour of both clubs and full-band living room shows produced by Undertow Music. Merge continues to be the musical home for Bachmann's work.

=== Other musical projects ===
Bachmann produced several Azure Ray records—their eponymous debut (WARM, 2001), Burn and Shiver (Saddle Creek, 2002), and Drawing Down the Moon (Saddle Creek, 2010). He also produced Liz Durrett's Outside Our Gates (WARM, 2008).

From 2013 to 2016, he was a member of Neko Case's touring band, playing guitar and piano. Case featured the Crooked Fingers song "Sleep All Summer" on the album Hell-On (ANTI-, 2018) as a duet with Bachmann. He also collaborated with fellow Case bandmate, pedal steel virtuoso Jon Rauhouse, to create the instrumental record Eric Bachmann and Jon Rauhouse (Telephant, 2016).

== Personal life ==
Bachmann is married to retired musician Liz Durrett, who is the niece of singer/songwriter Vic Chesnutt.

== Discography ==
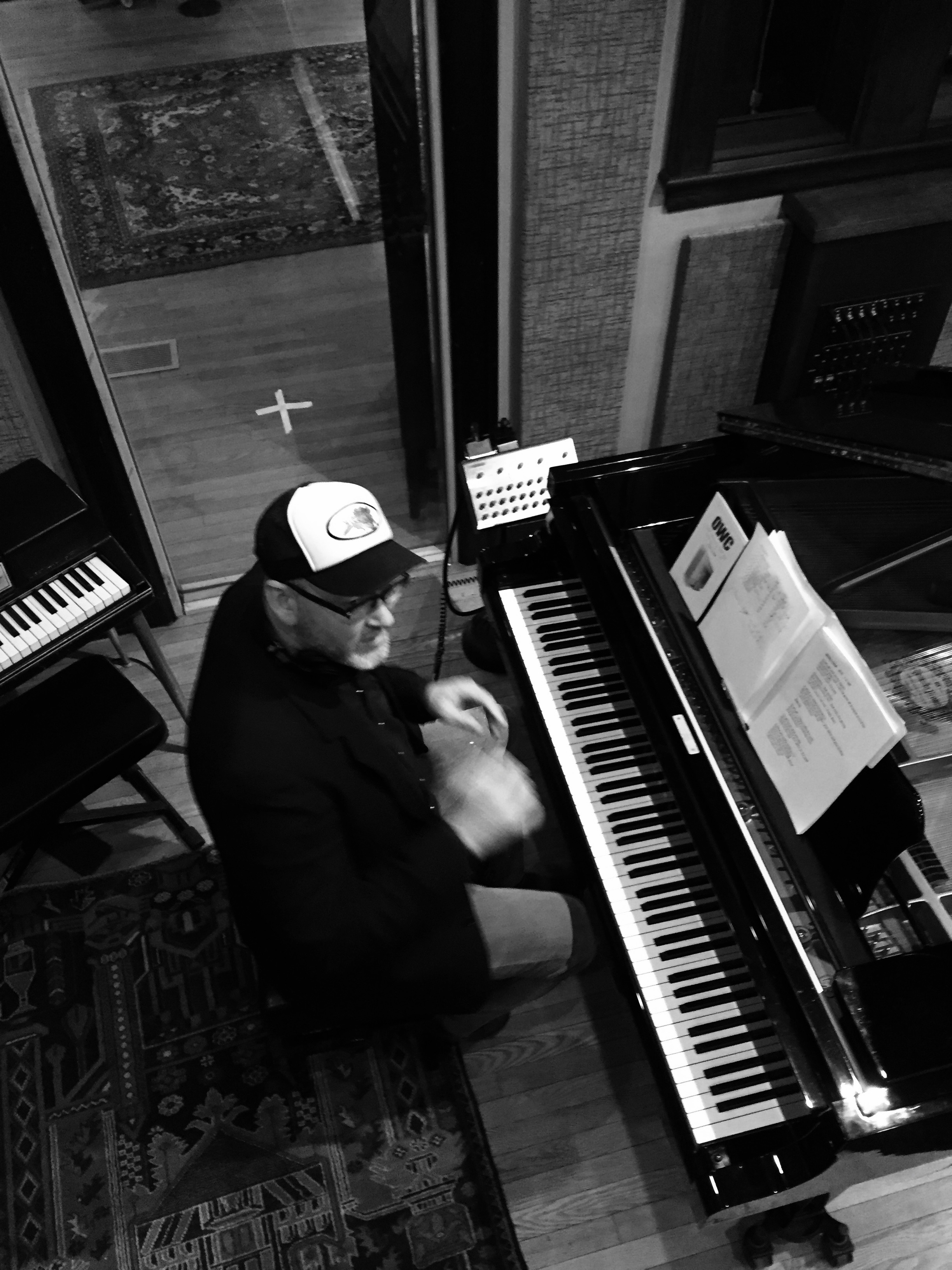
Bachmann in 2015

=== Albums ===
- Icky Mettle (1993) Archers of Loaf
- Vs the Greatest of All Time (1994) Archers of Loaf
- Vee Vee (1995) Archers of Loaf
- Barry Black (1995), Alias Records – Under the pseudonym Barry Black, featuring appearances from Ben Folds. Produced by Caleb Southern.
- Speed of Cattle (1996) Archers of Loaf
- All the Nations Airports (1996) Archers of Loaf
- Tragic Animal Stories (1997), Alias Records – As Barry Black.
- White Trash Heroes (1997) Archers of Loaf
- Crooked Fingers (1999) Crooked Fingers Warm Electronic Recordings
- Bring on the Snakes (2001) Crooked Fingers Warm Electronic Recordings
- Short Careers (2002), Merge Records
- Reservoir Songs Vol. 1 (2002) Crooked Fingers Merge Records
- Red Devil Dawn (2003) Crooked Fingers Merge Records
- Dignity and Shame (2005) Crooked Fingers Merge Records
- To the Races (2006), Saddle Creek Records
- Forfeit/Fortune (2008) Red Pig/Constant Artists Records
- Reservoir Songs Vol. 2 (2010) Crooked Fingers Foreign Leisure Records
- Breaks in the Armor (2011) Crooked Fingers, Merge Records
- Eric Bachmann (2016), Merge Records
- Eric Bachmann and Jon Rauhouse (2016), Telephant Records
- No Recover (2018), Merge Records

=== Album appearances ===
- Azure Ray – Azure Ray (2000), Warm Electronic Recordings
- Azure Ray – Burn and Shiver (2002), Warm Electronic Recordings
- Azure Ray – Hold On Love (2003), Saddle Creek
- Laura Minor – Let Evening Come (2004)
- Spoon – Gimme Fiction (2005), Merge
- David Dondero – South of the South (2005), Team Love
- Damien Jurado – On My Way to Absence (2005), Secretly Canadian
- Micah P. Hinson – Micah P. Hinson and the Opera Circuit (2007), Jade Tree
- Liz Durrett – Outside Our Gates (2008), Warm Electronic Recordings
- Azure Ray - Drawing Down The Moon (2010), Saddle Creek
- Neko Case – Hell-On (2018), Anti-
