= Forfeit/Fortune =

Studio album by Crooked Fingers
- Released: 2008
- Genre: Indie rock
- Length: 38:06
- Label: Constant Artists/Red Pig
- Producer: Eric Bachmann, Mark Nevers, Alex McManus

Crooked Fingers chronology
Dignity and Shame (2005)	Forfeit/Fortune (2008)	Breaks in the Armor (2011)

Professional ratings
Review scores
Source	Rating
AllMusic	4/5 stars
Pitchfork Media	5.2/10
PopMatters	5/10

Forfeit/Fortune (2008) is the fifth studio album recorded by the indie rock band Crooked Fingers. Eric Bachmann provides lead vocals, with Miranda Brown singing backing vocals, Elin Palmer providing backing vocals and violin, and Tim Husmann on drums. Guest appearances on the album include Brian Kotzur (Silver Jews), Tom Hagerman (DeVotchKa), and Neko Case (The New Pornographers).

== Track listing ==
1. "What Never Comes"
2. "Luisa's Bones"
3. "Phony Revolutions"
4. "Give and Be Taken"
5. "Let's Not Pretend (To Be New Men)"
6. "Cannibals"
7. "Sinisteria"
8. "No Me Los Des!"
9. "Run, Lieutenant, Run"
10. "Modern Dislocation"
11. "Your Control"
