= Men of war =

Men of war or Men o' war may refer to:

- Men of War, a video game series
  - Men of War (video game), a 2009 video game part of the series
- Men of War (1994 film), a film starring Dolph Lundgren
- Men of War (2024 film), a documentary film
- Men of War a 1993 novel by Jerry Pournelle
- Men of War (comics), a series of comic books published by DC Comics
- Lexington Men O' War, a defunct professional ice hockey team
- Men O' War, a 1929 short film

== See also ==
- Man O' War (disambiguation)
- Man of war (disambiguation)
