= Art in Manila =

American indie rock supergroup

- Years active: 2007
- Label: Saddle Creek Records
- Past members: Steve Bartolomei; Corey Broman; Stefanie Drootin; Orenda Fink; Ryan Fox; Dan McCarthy; Chris Senseney; Adrianne Verhoeven

Art in Manila was an American indie rock "supergroup" consisting primarily of musicians based in the Midwestern states of Nebraska and Kansas. After originally forming with the name Art Bell (after the American broadcaster and author), the band later changed its name. Their album Set the Woods On Fire (2007) was recorded by Joel Petersen (The Faint, Broken Spindles) and mixed by Andy LeMaster (Now It's Overhead).

At the time the album was recorded, the band consisted of Steve Bartolomei (Mal Madrigal), Corey Broman (Dance Me Pregnant), Orenda Fink (Azure Ray), Ryan Fox (The Good Life), Dan McCarthy (McCarthy Trenching), and Adrianne Verhoeven (The Anniversary); former members include Stefanie Drootin (The Good Life) and Chris Senseney (Big Harp).

== Band members ==
- Steve Bartolomei: guitar
- Corey Broman: drums, percussion
- Orenda Fink: vocals, guitar, trumpet
- Ryan Fox: bass guitar
- Dan McCarthy: keyboards, accordion, guitar
- Adrianne Verhoeven: vocals, keyboards, percussion

== Discography ==
- Set the Woods on Fire (2007, Saddle Creek Records)
