= As Above So Below (Azure Ray EP) =

As Above, So Below

EP by Azure Ray
- Released: September 4, 2012
- Genre: Dream pop
- Length: 21:32
- Label: Saddle Creek Records
- Producers: Andy LeMaster; Todd Fink

Azure Ray chronology
Drawing Down the Moon (2010)	As Above, So Below (2012)	Waves (2018)

Professional ratings
Review scores
Source	Rating
Paste	5.5/10 stars
Slant Magazine	4/5 stars

As Above, So Below is the seventh studio release by American duo Azure Ray, consisting of Maria Taylor and Orenda Fink. It was originally released on September 4, 2012, on Saddle Creek Records and features co-production by Andy LeMaster and Todd Fink (of The Faint). Following a 2-year hiatus after the release of Drawing Down the Moon, Fink and a pregnant Taylor entered the studio to record six news songs, with a more "hypnotic" "electronica" influence in collaboration with Andy LeMaster and Todd Fink. On July 17, 2012, Stereogum premiered the "starry, shivering cut" “Scattered Like Leaves.” NPR premiered "Red Balloon" on August 9, 2012, calling the "long, slow summer swoon," "devastating melancholy." Rolling Stone premiered the full EP stream on August 28, 2012.

== Track listing ==
1. "Scattered Like Leaves"
2. "Red Balloon"
3. "Unannounced"
4. "To This Life"
5. "The Heart Has Its Reasons"
6. "We Could Wake"

== Personnel ==
All songs written by Azure Ray.

- Andy LeMaster - production, engineer, mixing
- Todd Fink - production, artwork
- Jadon Ulrich - artwork
- Daniel Farris - mastering
- Ben Brodin - guitar sample on "Scattered Like Leaves"
