= Hold on Love =

Hold On Love

Studio album by Azure Ray
- Released: October 7, 2003
- Studio: Presto! Recording Studios
- Genre: Dream pop, folktronica
- Label: Saddle Creek
- Producer: Eric Bachmann

Azure Ray chronology
Burn and Shiver (2002)	Hold On Love (2003)	Drawing Down the Moon (2010)

Professional ratings
Aggregate scores
Source	Rating
Metacritic	67/100 link
Review scores
Source	Rating
AllMusic	3/5 stars
CMJ New Music Monthly	favorable

Hold On Love is an album released by the band Azure Ray. It was released October 7, 2003, on Saddle Creek Records.

It is the 54th release of Saddle Creek Records. The song "Across the Ocean" was featured in the Korean drama Coffee Prince.

== Track listing ==
1. "The Devil's Feet" - 2:30
2. "New Resolution" - 3:23
3. "We are Mice" - 3:49
4. "Look to Me" - 3:56
5. "The Drinks We Drank Last Night" - 4:01
6. "Across the Ocean" - 4:00
7. "If You Fall" - 3:03
8. "Sea of Doubts" - 3:36
9. "Dragonfly" - 2:13
10. "Nothing Like a Song" - 4:03
11. "These White Lights will Bend to Make Blue" - 4:08
12. "Hold On Love" - 3:17
13. "Across the Ocean (video)"
14. "We are Mice (live)"

== Musicians ==
- Orenda Fink
- Maria Taylor
- Clark Baechle – Drum Programming
- Ben Armstrong – Drums
- Andy LeMaster – Additional Instrumentation, Engineering, Mixing
- Eric Bachmann – Additional Instrumentation, Production, Arrangement, Mixing
- Mike Mogis – Pedal Steel, Engineering, Mixing
- Doug Van Sloun – Mastering
