= Lupe Sino =

Spanish actress (1917-1959)

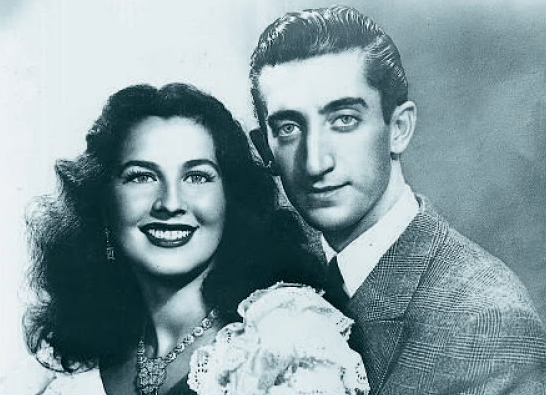
- Sino with Manolete
- Born: Antonia Bronchalo Lopesino; 6 March 1917; Spain
- Died: 13 September 1959 (aged 42)
- Partner: Manuel Rodríguez

Lupe Sino (March 6, 1917 – September 13, 1959, born Antonia Bronchalo Lopesino) was a Spanish actress.

== Biography ==
Antonia Bronchalo Lopesino was born on March 6, 1917, in Sayatón, a village in Guadalajara, Spain. She was the second of nine children (Benita, Basilia, Antonia, Claudia, Anunciación, Mari Pili, Emilio and Félix) born to Eugenia and Nicomedes, republican peasants. When she was fourteen, the family moved to Madrid and she began working as a servant, but ended up working in the world of Italian cinema with director Fernando Mignoni. She died in Madrid from a stroke on September 13, 1959.

== Career ==
Sino worked as a movie actress, and starred in several films, notably La dama torera (1950), El marqués de Salamanca (1948), El testamento del virrey (1944), and La famosa Luz María (1942).

== Personal life ==
She met Manolete, the matador, in the Chicote bar in Madrid, and was his girlfriend until his death by a fatal goring in the ring in 1947. She was not liked by his manager and family and was not allowed to see him before he bled to death on 29 August 1947. She was photographed by Paco Cano at his side afterwards, as he lay enshrouded.

When Manolete died, she moved to Mexico and she married the lawyer Manuel Rodríguez. She came back to Madrid after eight years, and died two years later.

== Popular culture ==
Sino was portrayed by Penélope Cruz in the 2007 movie, Manolete.
