= Drawing Down the Moon (Azure Ray album) =

Studio album by Azure Ray
- Released: September 14, 2010
- Recorded: 2009–2010
- Genre: Dream pop
- Length: 43:09
- Label: Saddle Creek
- Producer: Eric Bachmann

Azure Ray chronology
Hold on Love (2003)	Drawing Down the Moon (2010)	As Above So Below (2012)

Drawing Down the Moon is an album released by the band Azure Ray. It was released September 14, 2010 on Saddle Creek Records, seven years since their previous album Hold On Love.

== Background ==
On August 4, 2010, Stereogum announced Azure Ray had reunited and premiered the first song from Drawing Down the Moon, "Don't Leave My Mind.". They later premiered the video, directed by Ryan Berg, for "Don't Leave My Mind" on September 30, 2010, Pitchfork called said the new album, "sounds warmly familiar, a reminder of why we missed them in the first place." BBC called it "a warming blanket of an album, here for you to wrap up in." On January 25, 2011, Azure Ray released a new single from the recording sessions titled, "Silverlake", featuring Sparklehorse.

== Reception ==
Professional ratings
Aggregate scores
Source	Rating
Metacritic	66/100
Review scores
Source	Rating
AllMusic	4/5 stars
Drowned in Sound	6/10
Filter	83%
Pitchfork	6.5/10
PopMatters	7/10 stars

Drawing Down the Moon received mixed to positive reviews from critics. On Metacritic, the album holds a score of 66/100 based on 14 reviews, indicating "generally favorable reviews".

== Track listing ==
1. "Wake Up, Sleepyhead" - 1:44
2. "Don't Leave My Mind" - 3:43
3. "In the Fog" - 3:23
4. "Larraine" - 4:28
5. "On and On Again" - 4:22
6. "Make Your Heart" - 3:33
7. "Silver Sorrow" - 4:16
8. "Signs In the Leaves" - 3:00
9. "Love and Permanence" - 3:53
10. "Shouldn't Have Loved" - 4:10
11. "Dancing Ghosts" - 3:52
12. "Walking In Circles" - 2:46

== Personnel ==
- Orenda Fink
- Maria Taylor
