= November (EP) =

November EP

EP by Azure Ray
- Released: January 22, 2002
- Label: Saddle Creek Records

November EP is an EP by Azure Ray. It was released January 22, 2002, on Saddle Creek Records.

== Track listing ==
1. "November"
2. "For the Sake of the Song" (Townes Van Zandt)
3. "No Signs of Pain"
4. "Just a Faint Line"
5. "I Will Do These Things"
6. "Other Than This World"
