= Hallmark Guitars =

Hallmark Guitars is an American guitar manufacturer. The company was founded in 1966 by Joe Hall, formerly of Mosrite.

== First incarnation, 1966-68 ==
During its first short-lived existence, the company produced a series of guitars called the "Swept Wing," a rather "bizarre instrument," its only model. It first appeared as a semisolid-body guitar; later a solid-body model and a 12-string version were made, even a double neck. The company declared bankruptcy in 1968.

== Return of Hallmark ==
Hallmark Guitars was restarted by Bob Shade, a guitar builder and enthusiast from Maryland, who acquired the rights to the name from Joe Hall in the late 1990s. On an individual basis, he builds Hallmarks out of his shop in Maryland; mass-produced Hallmark SweptWings are also available.
