= Reservoir Songs =

EP by Crooked Fingers
- Released: May 7, 2002
- Genre: Indie rock
- Length: 24:21
- Label: Merge Records
- Producers: John Golden, Andy Baker

Crooked Fingers chronology
Bring on the Snakes (2001)	Reservoir Songs (2002)	Red Devil Dawn (2003)

Professional ratings
Review scores
Source	Rating
AllMusic	link
Robert Christgau	B+ link
Pitchfork Media	8/10 5/23/02

Reservoir Songs is an EP recorded by the indie rock band Crooked Fingers and released in 2002. A five-song EP which collects some of the band's favorite covers which they had been playing for the past couple of years on tour, it marked the first release for Crooked Fingers on the Merge label. It was recorded January 11–15, 2002 in Atlanta, GA and mastered by John Golden with additional production by Andy Baker.

== Track listing ==
1. "Sunday Morning Coming Down " (Kris Kristofferson)
2. "Solitary Man" (Neil Diamond)
3. "When You Were Mine" (Prince)
4. "The River" (Bruce Springsteen)
5. "Under Pressure" (Queen and Bowie)
