= Let Evening Come =

"Let Evening Come" is a poem by Jane Kenyon.

There are several different settings of "Let Evening Come" by various composers. Presented here is a compilation of the composers who have written and recorded settings of "Let Evening Come."

== William Bolcom ==
William Bolcom was asked to set this poem as a duet for Tatiana Troyanos and Benita Valente. William Bolcom’s setting of the text “Let Evening Come” was performed in honor of the memory of Tatiana Toryanos on April 17 in Tully Hall by soprano Benita Valente. This recital concluded the New York premier of "Let Evening Come." This three-song cantata is orchestrated for soprano, viola, and piano. William Bolcom composed "Let Evening Come" in memory of Troyanos. Originally, Bolcom had plans to compose the piece for a duet between Troyanos and Valente. Troyanos died unexpectedly before the piece was finished. Bolcom was going to include the piano in this duo, but when Troyanos died, he decided to use the viola instead of her voice. The instrument was not meant to necessarily play what Troyanos would have sung; it had a line of its own and was a support and counter-melody to Valente’s voice. “Let Evening Come” is the last song in the set. Bolcom uses some of his sweetest music with Kenyon’s short stanzas. The key statement in this song is the phrase, “God does not leave us comfortless.” Let Evening Come was recorded by Benita Valente as the sopranist, Cynthia Raim as the pianist, and Michael Tree as the violist for Centaur Records.

== Gwyneth Walker ==
Gwyneth Walker is an American composer. Walker has been composing since she was two years old. Growing up, she often had friends over to play her newest compositions. Gwyneth does not feel like her style was heavily influenced by anyone; she was able to find her own “voice” at an early age. She has degrees from Brown University, Hartt School of Music, and the University of Hartford. One of her teachers includes Arnold Franchetti. She specializes in writing music that is accessible to all people. Walker comes from a Quaker family; she is very practical and uses Quaker Philosophy in her life. She uses diatonic harmony that often has triads and quartal harmonies. “Let Evening Come” is listed as Women’s Chorus with Piano Accompaniment. It was written in 2001 and lasts 3:30 min. It is written for SSA (soprano, second soprano, and alto

Website: http://www.gwynethwalker.com/pdf/schndiss.pdf.

Recordings: https://www.youtube.com/watch?v=KN-5TyArTms.

== Joelle Wallach ==
Joelle Wallach is an American composer. She studied piano, singing, theory, and composition at the Juilliard Preparatory School. She has degrees from Sarah Lawrence College, Columbia University, and the Manhattan School of Music. “Wallach’s works are widely performed in the USA and Europe and several have been recorded. Her sacred works use a post-Wagnerian tonal idiom, while the more experimental orchestral works exhibit a wide range of influences—including Hebrew chant and North African dance traditions and effects.

Recordings:

Joelle Wallach: https://www.youtube.com/watch?v=Sy3QH4gZZTM

http://butler.naxosmusiclibrary.com/catalogue/item.asp?cid=4TAY-CD-4034

== Hayes Biggs ==
Hayes Biggs is an American composer. He has degrees from Southwestern College, Memphis, Southern Methodist University, and Columbia University. “His principal composition teachers included Mario Davidovsky, Jack Beeson, Donald Erb, Donald Freund, and Marvin Lamb. Biggs has a lot of experience as a choral singer and vocal accompanist; these things have influenced the way he sets texts. Gregorian chant and Renaissance motets have particularly influenced his writing.

Recordings: https://www.youtube.com/watch?v=ZYbxMyAm6pg

== Donald Grantham ==
Donald Grantham is an American Composer. He studied at the University of Oklahoma. He also studied at the American Conservatory with Boulanger. At the University of Southern California, he studied with Fontainebleau; his teachers at this school were Robert Linn and Halsey Stevens. Grantham has earned the Prix Lili Boulanger (1976), a Guggenheim Fellowship (1990), as well as other awards. Grantham is particularly drawn to large vocal works and music for wind ensemble. He also has orchestra music that has been performed often. Grantham is skillful at contrapuntal lines that are intricate but are not repetitive.

Recordings: https://www.youtube.com/watch?v=wuh9fmRl56U

== Other composers and recordings ==
Jennifer Bernard Merkowitz:

https://soundcloud.com/jennymerkowitz/sets/let-evening-come

Carson Cooman:

http://butler.naxosmusiclibrary.com/catalogue/item.asp?cid=8.559655

Ricky Ian Gordon:

http://butler.naxosmusiclibrary.com/catalogue/item.asp?cid=8.669028-29

Jennifer Steege:

https://www.youtube.com/watch?v=tV9SShp3tfU

M.L.P. Badarak:

https://www.youtube.com/watch?v=VuRHnVIHFMA

Graeme Morton:

https://www.youtube.com/watch?v=PV3ChpUOLQg

Robert Sheldon:

https://www.youtube.com/watch?v=NgBSaqdsymc

Brian Holmes:

https://www.youtube.com/watch?v=ce7R4B4igkg

http://butler.naxosmusiclibrary.com/catalogue/item.asp?cid=CLCD-922
