= Man of war =

Man of war may refer to:

== Military ==
- Man-of-war, refers to any type of heavily armed warship from the 16th to the 19th centuries

== Animals ==
- Man-of-war fish, a driftfish generally found in open sea or close to the Portuguese man o' war
- Portuguese man o' war, also referred to as Portuguese man of war, a floating marine colonial hydrozoa

== Media ==
- Men of War (1994 film), a 1994 American film
- Max Manus: Man of War, a 2008 Norwegian film
- "Man of War" (song), a song by Radiohead
- Man of War (video game), a 1997 naval combat strategy game
- Men of War (2024 film), a 2024 American and Canada film
- Man of War (2026 film), a 2026 American film

== Places ==
- Man of War gneisses, a sequence of metamorphosed igneous rocks found on the Lizard peninsular in Cornwall, UK
- Man of War, County Dublin, Ireland, a small populated place

== See also ==
- Man o' War (1917–1947), an American Thoroughbred racehorse
- Manowar, an American heavy metal band
- Men of war (disambiguation)
