= Manolete (film) =

- Directed by: Menno Meyjes
- Written by: Menno Meyjes
- Produced by: Andrés Vicente Gómez
- Starring: Adrien Brody; Penélope Cruz; Santiago Segura; Ann Mitchell; Juan Echanove
- Cinematography: Robert Yeoman
- Edited by: Sylvie Landra
- Music by: Dan Jones; Gabriel Yared
- Production companies: Iberoamericana Films Producción; Future Films; Manolete Productions; Quinta Communications; Pierce/Williams Entertainment
- Distributed by: Lolafilms Distribucción (Spain); G2 Pictures (United Kingdom); Gravitas Ventures (United States); 3L Filmverleih (Germany)
- Release dates: 6 September 2008 (TIFF); 23 August 2010 (United Kingdom); 7 June 2011 (United States); 24 August 2012 (Spain)
- Running time: 92 minutes
- Countries: Spain; United Kingdom; United States; Germany
- Languages: English; Spanish
- Budget: $28 million

Manolete, also known as The Passion Within in the United Kingdom, Blood and Passion in Canada, and A Matador's Mistress in the United States, is a 2008 biopic of bullfighter Manuel Laureano Rodríguez Sánchez, better known as "Manolete". The film was written and directed by Menno Meyjes. This is the first film from HandMade Films since Lock, Stock and Two Smoking Barrels (1998).

== Synopsis ==
The Menno Meyjes directed drama stars Adrien Brody as Spanish bullfighter Manolete, in a film that covers his late life love affair with actress Lupe Sino (Penélope Cruz) before he was gored to death in the bull ring. Sino's communist politics turned their affair into a scandal in the early 1940s, especially after discovering her previous marriage to a PCE member. The film begins with Manolete's last day in Linares.

== Cast ==
- Adrien Brody as Manuel Laureano Rodríguez Sánchez, a.k.a. "Manolete"
- Penélope Cruz as Antoñita "Lupe" Sino
- Santiago Segura as Guillermo
- Ann Mitchell as Doña Angustias
- Josep Linuesa as Enrique de Ahumada
- Juan Echanove as Pepe Cámara
- Pedro Casablanc as General
- Tomas Rozzi as the 'dealer'
- Nacho Aldeguer as Luis Miguel Dominguín
- Diego Martín
- Berta de la Dehesa
- Rubén Ochandiano
- Omar Muñoz as young Manolete
- Denise Moreno as girl
- Cayetano Rivera Ordóñez as Torero

== Release ==
The film premiered on 28 August 2008 in the Toronto International Film Festival.

Despite a planned release date of 2007, the film faced several production delays and a spiralling budget. Although it was scheduled for a theatrical release in France on 31 March 2010, Deadline's Mike Fleming reported that, "Even though the film stars two Oscar winners, it never found any takers for a theatrical run." The film has been shelved since 2007.

In April 2011 - Xenon Pictures CEO Leigh Savidge announced that on 7 June 2011 Xenon Pictures would release a newly edited version of A Matador's Mistress on DVD.

Gravitas Ventures announced on 14 March 2011 that it has acquired VOD and digital rights to Manolete. Gravitas, which is licensing the film from Viva Pictures, plans to release the film on demand via cable, satellite, telco and online in June 2011. "We are confident no one is better positioned to exploit this epic high-value production on a digital platform," said Viva president Victor Elizalde.

== Controversy ==
Although bullfighting scenes were shot expensively without bulls, animal rights activists encouraged a boycott of the film. Protestors rejected what they perceived to be a glamorous image of a matador on film. "It is inadmissible to release a film in which the hero is a matador," said the Alliance Anticorrida, a French anti-bullfighting group, in a message to its 20,000 members. "If they are properly informed, a great number of spectators will avoid this new film."

== Filming locations ==
The film was shot in 2005, four years before Cruz won her Oscar for Vicky Cristina Barcelona.

- Córdoba, Spain
- Alcoy, Alicante, Spain
- Alicante, Spain
- Madrid, Spain
- El Puerto de Santa María, Cádiz, Spain
- Sanlúcar de Barrameda, Cádiz, Spain
