= Liz Durrett =

American singer-songwriter

- Born: 1977 (age 48–49); Rome, Georgia, United States
- Origin: Athens, Georgia, United States
- Genre: Indie folk
- Occupations: Singer, songwriter
- Years active: 1993–present
- Label: Warm Records
- Website: www.lizdurrett.com

Liz Durrett (born 1977) is an American singer-songwriter born in Rome, Georgia and now based in Athens, Georgia.

== Career ==
Durrett began recording in the mid-1990s while at high school and later at the University of Georgia at Athens, initially with her uncle Vic Chesnutt producing.

She released three albums on Athens-based Warm Records. Her first, Husk, was a collection of recordings from her teenage years recorded with Chesnutt between 1993 and 1996. Pitchfork writer Ryan Dombal described it "Think Partridge Family but uglier, death-obsessed, and with a sunburnt, junkyard car in place of the fruity schoolbus".

The Mezzanine followed in January 2006, also produced by Chesnutt.

Her third album, Outside Our Gates, was produced by Eric Bachmann and released in September 2008. The album has received positive reviews, with Allmusic awarding it three and a half stars, reviewer Mark Deming describing it as "quite impressive", and Pitchfork scoring it at 7.2, with Stephen M. Deusner calling it "Durrett's liveliest and rangiest record to date, as purposeful as her previous efforts but somehow more surefooted and traipsing".

Durrett has toured throughout the United States and Europe and has made several guest appearances on other artist's records.

Throughout the 2010s, she joined Crooked Fingers, the musical project of Eric Bachmann, who would become her husband. She appeared on Crooked Fingers’ 2012 release “Breaks in the Armor.” Since the disbandment of Crooked Fingers in 2016, she has shifted away from her musical career, but contributed backing vocals to a few tracks on Bachmann’s solo records. Bachmann recorded her song “Carolina” on his 2016 eponymous solo release.

== Musical style ==
NPR described Durrett's music as "sparse and somber Southern folk music". The Riverfront Times described her music as "full of emotionally distraught tunes that take full advantage of her aching voice", calling her vocals "like Lucinda Williams on the worst Quaalude bender imaginable". No Depression described her voice as "willowy". Several comparisons have been made with Cat Power.

== Discography ==
=== Albums ===
- Husk (2005) Warm
- The Mezzanine (2006), Warm
- Outside Our Gates (2008), Warm

=== Singles and EPs ===
- "Cup On The Counter" (iTunes single) (2005), Warm

=== Compilation appearances ===
- Easy To Be Free: The Songs Of Rick Nelson (2006), Planting Seeds
- AthFest 2007 (2007), Ghostmeat
- Finest Worksongs (2007), Iron Horse
- Even Cowgirls Get the Blues (2007), Fargo
- Have A Good Night 3 (2008), blog up musique

=== Guest appearances ===
- Vic Chesnutt Ghetto Bells – backing vocals on "Virginia", "What Do You Mean?", "Vesuvius", and "Rambunctious Cloud".
- Vic Chesnutt Is The Actor Happy – appears on "Betty Lonely" as the angel chorus.
- Vic Chesnutt West of Rome – played violin wherever Michael Stipe "heard" violin.
- Phosphorescent Pride – backing vocals on "The Waves At Night"
- Phosphorescent Aw Come Aw Wry – part of the aw come aw wry choir on "Endless Pt. 2"
- Ham1 The Captain's Table – backing vocals on "White Rat" and "Hubcap Frisbees"
- Don Chambers Zebulon – backing vocals on "Friar's Lantern", "Send Me No Angels", and "Bind My Wounds"
- Hope for Agoldensummer Ariadne Thread – member of the Gutter Angel Soul Choir
- Pacific UV e.p. – backing vocals on "50s"
