= Brian Causey =

American musician, composer and singer

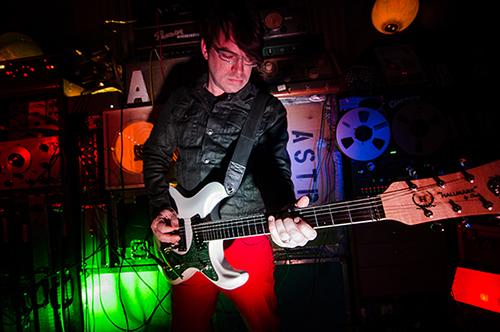
Brian Causey

Brian Causey (also known as Star Crunch) is an American musician, composer and singer. He is a founding member of surf rock band Man or Astro-man? and was the main songwriter and guitarist in the band from 1991 to 1998, and from 2006 to present. He currently runs the record label Warm Electronic Recordings. His stage name is a reference to the popular snack item made by Little Debbie, Star Crunch.

== Television work ==
In 1996, Man or Astro-man? recorded new music for the Cartoon Network show Space Ghost Coast to Coast, which was mostly used as an ending theme for the show in the late 1990s. During his departure from Man or Astro-man?, Causey composed and performed the theme song for Jimmy Neutron: Boy Genius and The Adventures of Jimmy Neutron, Boy Genius, for which he was awarded a BMI Cable Award in 2003 and 2004.

== Equipment ==
In the early 1990s, Brian Causey mostly used a Gretsch Tennessean, sometimes opting for a Mosrite Mark I. More recently, Brian has been using Hallmark Custom 60s exclusively and has his own Hallmark "Man or Astroman?" Star Crunch signature model.
