= Bring On the Snakes =

Bring on The Snakes

Studio album by Crooked Fingers
- Released: February 20, 2001
- Genre: Indie rock
- Length: 41:29
- Label: WARM
- Producer: Brian Paulson

Crooked Fingers chronology
Crooked Fingers (2000)	Bring on The Snakes (2001)	Reservoir Songs (2002)

Professional ratings
Review scores
Source	Rating
AllMusic	2.5/5 stars
Pitchfork	6.2/10

Bring on the Snakes is the second studio album by the indie rock band Crooked Fingers. It was released in February 2001. It was recorded and produced in Fall 2000, in Pittsboro, NC, by Brian Paulson.

== Critical reception ==
The Tallahassee Democrat wrote: "The arrangements are delicate, dissonant and whimsical, perfect settings for Bachmann's raw, weary growl. Like an off-kilter Springsteen, he sings dark anthems of life, love and loss in Jungleland."

== Track listing ==
1. "The Rotting Strip" - 5:10
2. "Devil's Train" - 4:57
3. "Surrender is Treason" - 3:24
4. "Sad Love" - 7:27
5. "Doctors of Deliverance" - 5:15
6. "Every Dull Moment" - 4:12
7. "Here Come the Snakes" - 5:59
8. "There's a Blue Light" - 5:05
