= Archers of Loaf =

American indie rock band

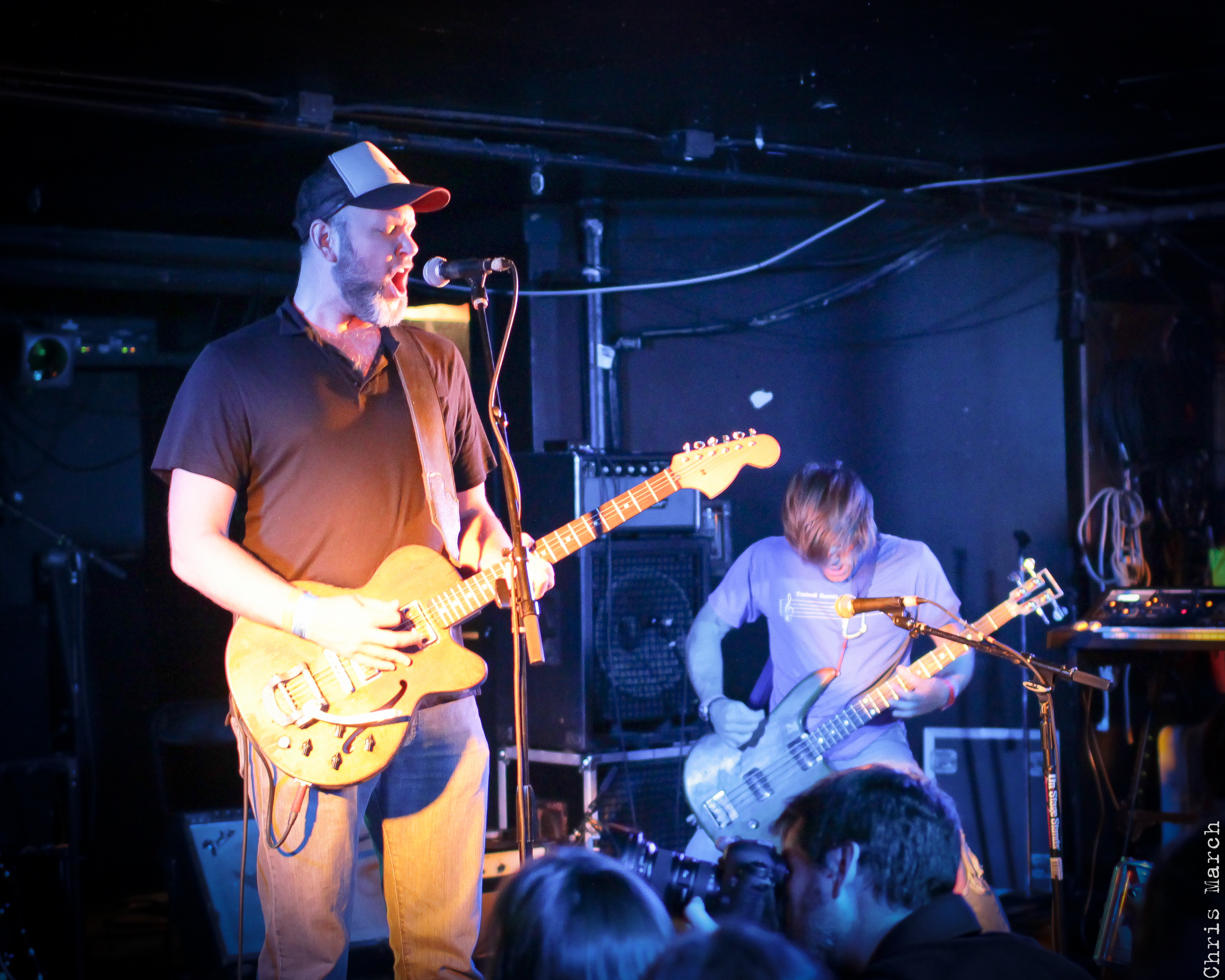
- Archers of Loaf in 2012

Background information
- Origin: Chapel Hill, North Carolina, U.S.
- Genres: Indie rock, noise rock
- Years active: 1991–1998, 2011–present
- Labels: Alias; Merge
- Members: Eric Bachmann; Matt Gentling; Eric Johnson; Mark Price

Archers of Loaf is an American indie rock band originally formed in Chapel Hill, North Carolina, in 1991. The group toured extensively and released four studio albums, one compilation, numerous singles and EPs, and a live album which was released after the band broke up in 1998. In 2011 the band began a reunion tour that coincided with the reissue of four of its albums by Merge Records. In July 2022, the band announced the release of their first album in nearly 25 years, Reason in Decline, released also via Merge Records in October of the same year.

== History ==
=== Early history (1991–1995) ===
Singer/guitarist Eric Bachmann, guitarist Eric Johnson, bassist Matt Gentling, and drummer Mark Price, all originally from Asheville, North Carolina, formed Archers of Loaf in the early 1990s. Eric Bachmann was a saxophone major at Appalachian State University before dropping out because he "didn't want to be a high school band director."

Their initial release in 1992 was a 45" single, "Wrong" b/w "South Carolina" given away free with issue 1 of Stay Free! magazine.

The band signed with Alias records, and released their second single "Web in Front" in February 1993; it received moderate college radio airplay. The song was featured in a season five episode of Beavis and Butt-Head, and was included on the soundtrack of the movie Mallrats in 1995.

Archers of Loaf released their debut album, Icky Mettle, in September 1993. It was critically well-received, with critic Robert Christgau awarding his second-highest rating of "A", and peaked at No. 18 on the CMJ New Music Monthly Top 150 Album charts, charting for 21 weeks. In the 2008 book The Pitchfork 500 named "Web in Front" one of the top 500 songs of recent decades.

In 1994, the Archers released the EP Vs the Greatest of All Time. However, the song "The Greatest of All Time" does not appear on this release but rather the second album, Vee Vee, released in 1995. Vee Vee followed a similar template as their previous recordings and featured the track "Harnessed in Slums", which became popular on college radio. The album also garnered significant attention outside the independent music scene, culminating in the band being courted by Maverick Records, a division of Warner Music Group, which the band rejected. Bachmann later stated that he and the band did not really consider the offer. The band was still under contract with Alias, and changing labels would put them into considerable debt to Maverick. According to Bachmann, "We already signed a deal [with Alias] and it costs lots of money to get out of these things. If we would have had Maverick buy out our contract, we'd be however many thousands of dollars in debt to them. It's really complex that way and it really didn't make sense to do that". The band had another reason for rejecting the Maverick offer: They did not want to be associated with the other high-profile bands on Maverick. "The other bands [on Maverick] were that bad," said Price at the time. "There are other bands on major labels that are associated with a lot of shit but it's big enough that there are a least a few bands that you like. For us on Maverick, it'd be us and Candlebox and Alanis..."

In 1995 the band had its highest-profile tour opening for Weezer. The band's sometimes brash sound did not go over all that well with the Weezer crowd, and Gentling later said of the tour, "It wasn't as much that we didn't like the Weezer guys, but the opening bands get treated like crap by the people who work (at the venues). And as far as our music is concerned, I don't really know if we're all that compatible, at least live." In 1996 the band released The Speed of Cattle, a collection of B-sides, singles, and John Peel session tracks.

=== Later years and breakup (1996–1998) ===
Their third studio album, 1996's All the Nation's Airports, was considered far more accessible than their previous releases, and was the first to be distributed by a major label, Elektra Records (the band was still signed to Alias Records, though). The album was recorded in Seattle and took three weeks to complete, which was the most time the band had been in the studio to complete an album up to that point.

Gentling said of the experience, "We knew we wanted to take a long time on this album. We specifically wanted not to do tracks over and over and over again, but more to work on tone and get all of our instruments down right. We took over a day (just) to get the drums sounding right."

The band toured extensively in support of the record, to limited mass commercial success. Of the tour, Bachmann said, "We got back and we were not real happy with the way that [the tour] went. Usually when you finish a tour you have a general idea of a song or two you can start working on, but we got back and were like 'geez, what are we going to do?'" The band almost broke up at this point, due to a general lack of enthusiasm for the continuation of the project. However, after some soul searching, they decided to continue on for the time being. "We thought we'd had too good a time with it, so let's make another record, do another tour, and if there's not another spark, we'll split up after that," said Bachmann of the episode.

Their final LP, White Trash Heroes, was released in 1998. The album's style deviated drastically from their first three albums, and received mixed reviews from critics. The album's creative break from the band's previous work may have stemmed from the different writing process used for White Trash Heroes. According to Bachmann, "Things were laid down one at a time, though we did play a lot of it live, too, but pieced together more perfectly so we could hear when one sound was beginning to get in the way of something else." The band went to great lengths in the studio in an attempt to keep the writing from turning stale. For example, on the song "Banging on a Dead Drum," the band members all switched instruments to try to liven up the feel of the song. Johnson plays drums, Gentling plays slide guitar, Price plays bass, and Bachmann still plays guitar, as he was the one who knew the song.

This approach made playing songs from the album on the last tour more difficult. "Certain songs we don't even play yet," Bachmann stated in an interview during the White Trash Heroes tour. "We haven't even learned them that well due to the way the record was pieced together. They're not impossible to play, we just haven't pulled them out yet...as time goes on we learn more of the new ones, and they've been coming across fine." During the tour supporting the album, Eric Johnson missed several dates due to his day job's work schedule. Brian Causey, guitarist for Man or Astro-man? and friend of the band, filled in for the missing Johnson. In late 1998, after Price was diagnosed with, and subsequently had surgery for, carpal tunnel syndrome, the band decided to call it quits for good.

=== Post-breakup projects ===
Bachmann moved on to multiple solo projects and the band Crooked Fingers. Gentling went on to provide extra instrumentation on tour with another North Carolina-bred band, Superchunk as well as a brief stint as live bassist for Band of Horses, the Poles, and Analog Moon. He has also continued to work with Bachmann as a contributor in Crooked Fingers. Johnson self-released one EP and one full-length under the moniker "Spookie" (originally Spookie J) and attended law school in North Carolina. He continues to play and record. In 2000, Alias released Seconds Before the Accident. This project was the band's first official live album and was recorded during their final show at the Cat's Cradle in Carrboro. It was the last album released by the band.

=== Reunion (2011–present) ===
On January 15, 2011, Archers of Loaf reunited to play an unannounced set at The Cat's Cradle in Carrboro, North Carolina. They opened for local act The Love Language. On May 29, 2011, they performed at the Sasquatch! Music Festival outside of Seattle, Washington which was recorded for broadcast and archive by NPR Music and KEXP-FM. The band were chosen by Les Savy Fav to perform at the ATP Nightmare Before Christmas festival that they co-curated in December 2011 in Minehead, England. On June 25, 2011, the band performed their song "Wrong" on NBC's Late Night with Jimmy Fallon. The band continued to tour throughout 2011 and 2012 while their back catalog was reissued by Merge Records.

Bachmann has stated in interviews that his thought processes around the band have changed over time and that his relationships with the older material are also different: "Essentially, before, when I was a 20-year-old kid playing that stuff, I got some sense of satisfaction or power. I felt confident playing in front of people. Now I don't feel that satisfaction or that power," he said. "The reward I get now is I'm going out and people are enjoying hearing it. My relationship had to change with the songs, and in that light I like all of them."

Asked about the band's future plans, Bachmann did not rule out a new album, but noted that it was not something that was on the immediate horizon following the reunion tour. "The worst thing [Archers of Loaf] could do is force something out and have it be a bad version of something we already did. It's going to have to be a forward step. I don't want to recreate the 25-year-old kid writing the songs that I would do now with those three other guys, so we'd have to think that through. They're very good to work with, in that way. It's not out of the question, because everyone thinks the same way. No one wants to do 'Icky Mettle 2.'"

A live concert documentary What Did You Expect?, capturing the band's August 2011 performances at The Cat's Cradle was released in 2012. The film was directed by Gorman Bechard. In 2015, the band released the double album Curse of the Loaf, which is the Brian Paulson produced concert audio from the documentary. The deluxe package also featured the original poster from the two nights at Cat's Cradle, as well as a copy of the film.

In a 2018 interview with Eric Bachmann, he said all of the members of Archers of Loaf are on board with the idea of reforming and making a new record, saying "Oh yeah, everybody wants to do it — I just have to write the songs." In November 2019, the band posted a video on their YouTube channel entitled "The Return Of The Loaf," teasing toward new music.

On February 20, 2020, the Archers of Loaf digitally released "Raleigh Days", their first new music since 1998.

On July 13, 2022, the Archers of Loaf announced their first LP in 24 years, Reason in Decline, which was released on October 21, 2022, via Merge Records. With the announcement, they also released a new single, "In the Surface Noise" and announced a week of East Coast tour dates for late November/early December 2022. The single "Screaming Undercover" followed in August 2022, with an animated video created by Paul Friedrich.

== Discography ==
=== Albums ===
- Icky Mettle (Alias, 1993; Merge, 2011)
- Vee Vee (Alias, 1995; Merge, 2012)
- All the Nations Airports (Alias, 1996; Merge, 2012)
- White Trash Heroes (Alias, 1998; Merge, 2012)
- Reason in Decline (Merge, 2022)

=== EPs and other collections ===
- Vs the Greatest of All Time (Alias, 1994)
- The Speed of Cattle (Alias, 1996)
- Vitus Tinnitus (Alias, 1997)
- Seconds Before the Accident (Alias, 2000)
- Curse of the Loaf (ARRA, 2015)

=== Singles ===
- "Wrong"/"South Carolina" (Stay Free, 1992)
- The Loaf's Revenge (contains "Web in Front"/"Bathroom"/"Tatyana") (Alias, 1993)
- Might (Alias, 1993)
- The Results After the Loaf's Revenge (contains "What Did You Expect?"/"Ethel Merman") (Merge, 1994)
- "Telepathic Traffic"/"Angel Scraper" split with Monsterland, (Radiopaque, 1994)
- "Funnelhead"/"Quinnbeast" split with Treepeople, (Sonic Bubblegum, 1994)
- "Harnessed in Slums"/"Telepathic Traffic" (Alias, 1995)
- "Mutes in the Steeple"/Smoking Pot in the Hot City" (Esther, 1995)
- "Vocal Shrapnel"/"Density" (Alias, 1996)
- "Jive Kata" (Alias, 1997)
- "Raleigh Days" (Merge, 2020)
- "Talking Over Talk"/"Cruel Reminder" (Merge, 2020)
- "Street Fighting Man" (Merge, 2020)
- "In the Surface Noise" (Merge, 2022)
- "Screaming Undercover" (Merge, 2022)

== In popular culture ==
- In the Archer three-part episode "Heart of Archness", main character Sterling Archer names his lacrosse team the "Archers of Loafcrosse". (The show’s creator Adam Reed is a UNC graduate)
- The song "South Carolina" was featured on the soundtrack of the TV show My So-Called Life.
- The song "Web in Front" was featured on the soundtrack of the movie Mallrats.
- The music video for "Web in Front" was featured on an episode of Beavis and Butt-head.
- Mentioned in the song "Jerks of Attention" by Australian indie rock group Jebediah.
- The song "Harnessed in Slums" was featured on the soundtrack of the film The Boys Club.
- Lyrics from the Archers of Loaf song "Chumming the Ocean" are featured in the song "I Will Play My Game Beneath the Spin Light" by Long Island alternative rock band Brand New.
- A poster of Archers of Loaf is seen in Josh's room in the 2000 film Road Trip.
- A poster of Archers of Loaf is seen on the door of the Cyberdelia club in the 1995 film Hackers.
- The song "White Trash Heroes" was featured in Zero's "Dying To Live (2002)" video.
- Former Hot Rod Circuit frontman Andy Jackson started a band in 2008 called Death In The Park which was named after the Archers of Loaf song by the same name.
