= Crooked Fingers =

American indie rock band

Crooked Fingers is an American indie rock band, led by the former Archers of Loaf frontman Eric Bachmann. A vehicle for Bachmann's songwriting, the band's lineup changed between each record. Crooked Fingers released albums on WARM Records and Merge Records, and also independently.

== History ==
Following the breakup of Archers of Loaf in 1998, Bachmann's next project was a solo venture he named Crooked Fingers. The first release, a self-titled record, was released by WARM in 2000. It was followed shortly after by a second album on WARM, Bring on the Snakes. He also contributed a track to Badlands: A Tribute to Bruce Springsteen's Nebraska.

Crooked Fingers signed to Merge, and released Reservoir Songs EP in 2002, composed of cover songs of artists such as Neil Diamond and Queen. In 2003, they released Red Devil Dawn, their first full-length for Merge.

They released Dignity and Shame in 2005. Bachmann brought a full band on the road with him in support of the album and delighted audiences by having all the musicians pull their instruments off stage and into the crowd for a few numbers.

In October 2008, the band released the album Forfeit/Fortune independently, declining to sign a deal with any label and instead pursuing a direct-to-retail approach supported by sales at shows, the band's website, iTunes, and eMusic.

2011's "Breaks in the Armor" returned the band to Merge Records, and featured the addition of Bachmann's wife Liz Durrett to the lineup for the final record.

Crooked Fingers toured the United States, Canada, Europe, Japan, Australia, and New Zealand, both as a solo act and with a full band. They were featured on KCRW's Morning Becomes Eclectic and on National Public Radio's World Cafe in May 2005. On the 2005 U.S./Canada Tour, Matt Gentling, former member of Archers of Loaf, played the bass. The rotation of members in the band included Lara Meyerratken, R.L. Martin, Jo Jameson, Neil Swank, Barton Carroll, Kyle Johnson, and Dov Friedman, Miranda Brown, Elin Palmer, and Tim Husmann.

Following a fifteen year hiatus, Bachmann announced album Swet Deth would release in February 2026, with lead single "Cold Waves".

== Discography ==
=== Studio albums ===
- Crooked Fingers (Warm Records, 2000)
- Bring On the Snakes (Warm Records, 2001)
- Red Devil Dawn (Merge Records, 2003)
- Dignity and Shame (Merge Records, 2005)
- Forfeit/Fortune (Constant Artists/Red Pig, 2008)
- Breaks in the Armor (Merge Records, 2011)
- Swet Deth (Merge, 2026)

=== Singles and EPs ===
- "Atchafalyan Death Waltz" (7") (1999), Sub Pop
- "Broken Man" (7") (1999), Red Pig
- Reservoir Songs EP (2002), Merge Records
- "Sleep All Summer" (live) (7") (2005), Eastern Fiction
- Reservoir Songs Volume II (vinyl EP/download only) (2010), Foreign Leisure
