= Warm Electronic Recordings =

Warm Electronic Recordings (sometimes abbreviated to Warm Records) is an independent record label based in Athens, Georgia run by Brian Causey. Azure Ray, Japancakes, and Crooked Fingers are some of the artists on their roster.

== Artists ==
- Azure Ray
- Crooked Fingers
- Don Chambers And Goat
- Elk City
- Liz Durrett
- Empire State (band)
- Japancakes
- Pacific UV
- Parker and Lily
- Phosphorescent
- The Low Lows

== See also ==
- List of record labels
