= Alias Records =

American indie-rock record label

- Founded: 1988
- Genre: Rock
- Country of origin: U.S.
- Location: Lexington, Kentucky
- Official website: www.aliasrecords.com

Alias Records is a small American indie-rock record label based in Lexington, Kentucky.

Alias has released albums by American Music Club, Archers of Loaf, Yo La Tengo, The Magnolias, The Loud Family, Too Much Joy and Knapsack, among others.

Alias Records was formed in 1988 in San Francisco, California, affiliated with Recording Studio SOMA Sync. The following year Alias Records opened a second office under the guidance of owner Delight Hanover-Jenkins in Burbank, California, and was affiliated with the recording studio Royaltone Studio. Hanover-Jenkins oversaw the development of both companies.

The roster included Archers of Loaf. Having several releases in the Alias catalog, a deal was made with Merge Records in 2011 to re-issue four of the LPs with various singles and outtakes. Another notable band, Yo La Tengo, had their first Alias release come out in 1992, May I Sing, followed by Upside Down, an extra-long EP that actually contained an LP's worth of material. The band signed to Matador Records and has released several full-length LPs and a compilation of previously released material containing some of the Alias tracks.

American Music Club, a San Francisco band whose frontman was Mark Eitzel, received many accolades from the music press, but found little commercial success. Having two releases in the Alias Records catalog, the full-length LP Everclear and the CD-EP Rise, they also went on to record albums for Reprise Records and, after reforming in 2004, for Merge Records.

Barry Black (Archers of Loaf frontman Eric Bachmann's side project) also had releases on Alias. Other notable artists who recorded with Alias include Blithe, Caustic Resin, Distortion Felix, Harm Farm, Lida Husik, Paul K, Matt Keating, Knapsack, Loud Family, Throneberry, Trunk Federation, The Scourge of the Sea, and Neva Geoffrey. Alias Records has continued to distribute its back catalog.

== See also ==
- List of record labels
