= Conor Oberst discography =

This is the discography for American musician Conor Oberst.

== As a solo artist ==
Conor Oberst discography
- Studio albums: 8
- EPs: 2
- Soundtrack albums: 1
- Singles: 9

=== Studio albums ===
List of albums, with selected chart positions
Title	Album details	Peak chart positions										Sales
Title	Album details	US	US Alt	US Rock	US Folk	AUS	AUT	GER	NLD	SWI	UK	Sales
Water	Released: 1993; Label: Lumberjack; Format: Cassette	—	—	—	—	—	—	—	—	—	—	
Here's to Special Treatment	Released: 1994; Label: Sing, Eunuchs!; Format: Cassette	—	—	—	—	—	—	—	—	—	—	
The Soundtrack to My Movie	Released: 1996; Label: Sing, Eunuchs!; Format: Cassette	—	—	—	—	—	—	—	—	—	—	
Conor Oberst	Released: August 4, 2008; Label: Merge; Format: CD, LP, digital download	15	3	3	—	63	52	37	73	—	37	US: 98,000
Outer South (as Conor Oberst and the Mystic Valley Band)	Released: May 5, 2009; Label: Merge; Format: CD, LP, digital download	40	9	12	—	96	—	75	—	—	—	US: 38,000
Upside Down Mountain	Released: May 19, 2014; Label: Nonesuch; Format: CD, LP, digital download	19	6	6	1	—	39	54	88	64	55	US: 39,000
Ruminations	Released: October 14, 2016; Label: Nonesuch; Format: CD, LP, digital download	72	6	9	4	—	54	82	—	77	—	
Salutations	Released: March 17, 2017; Label: Nonesuch; Format: CD, LP, digital download	137	16	27	7	—	58	82	—	89	91	
"—" denotes a recording that did not chart or was not released in that territory

=== Soundtrack albums ===
List of soundtrack albums, with selected chart positions
Title	Album details	Peak chart positions
Title	Album details	US Folk
One of My Kind (as Conor Oberst and the Mystic Valley Band)	Released: May 15, 2012; Label: Team Love; Format: CD+DVD, LP, digital download	12

=== Extended plays ===
List of EPs
Title	Album details
Kill the Monster Before It Eats Baby (With Bill Hoover)	Released: 1996; Label: Sing, Eunuchs!; Format: 7-inch vinyl
Gentleman's Pact	Released: 2008; Label: Merge; Format: CD, LP

=== Singles ===
List of singles
Title	Year	Album
"Souled Out"	2008	Conor Oberst
"Million Dollar Bill"	2014	Non-album singles
"Hundreds of Ways" / "Fast Friends"	2014	Upside Down Mountain
"Standing on the Outside Looking In" / "Sugar Street"	2014	Non-album singles
"Tachycardia"	2016	Ruminations
"The Pearl" (live) (with Shawn Colvin and Patty Griffin)	2016	Non-album single
"A Little Uncanny" / "Napalm"	2017	Salutations
"Till St. Dymphna Kicks Us Out"	2017	Ruminations
"No One Changes" / "The Rockaways"	2018	Non-album single

== In bands ==
- Bright Eyes discography
- Commander Venus discography
- Desaparecidos discography
- Park Ave. discography
- Monsters of Folk discography
- Better Oblivion Community Center discography

== Guest appearances ==
Albums

- Mayday – Old Blood (2002)
- Arab Strap – Monday at the Hug & Pint (2003)
- Criteria – En Garde (2003)
- Cursive – The Ugly Organ (2003)
- Son, Ambulance – Key (2004)
- Maria Taylor – 11:11 (2005) and Lynn Teeter Flower (2007) and In the Next Life (2016)
- Various Artists - "The Life and Songs of Emmylou Harris" (2016) The Pearl
- Kyle Crane – Crane Like the Bird (2019)

Songs

- The Album Leaf – "Hungry for a Holiday"
- Dntel – "Breakfast in Bed"
- Melon Galia – "N'en Parlons Plus"
- The Faint – "Dust"
- David Dondero – "Less Than The Air" (2007)
- Son, Ambulance - "Violet" (2001)
- Tilly and The Wall – "You and I Misbehaving" (2003)
- Jenny Lewis and The Watson Twins – "Handle With Care" (2005)
- Street to Nowhere – "Tipsy" (2006)
- First Aid Kit – "King of the World" (2012)
- alt-J – "Warm Foothills" (2014)
- Phoebe Bridgers - "Would You Rather?" (2017)
- Phoebe Bridgers - "Halloween" (2020)
- Hurray for the Riff Raff - "The World Is Dangerous" (2024)
