= Taylor Hollingsworth =

American musician (born 1980)

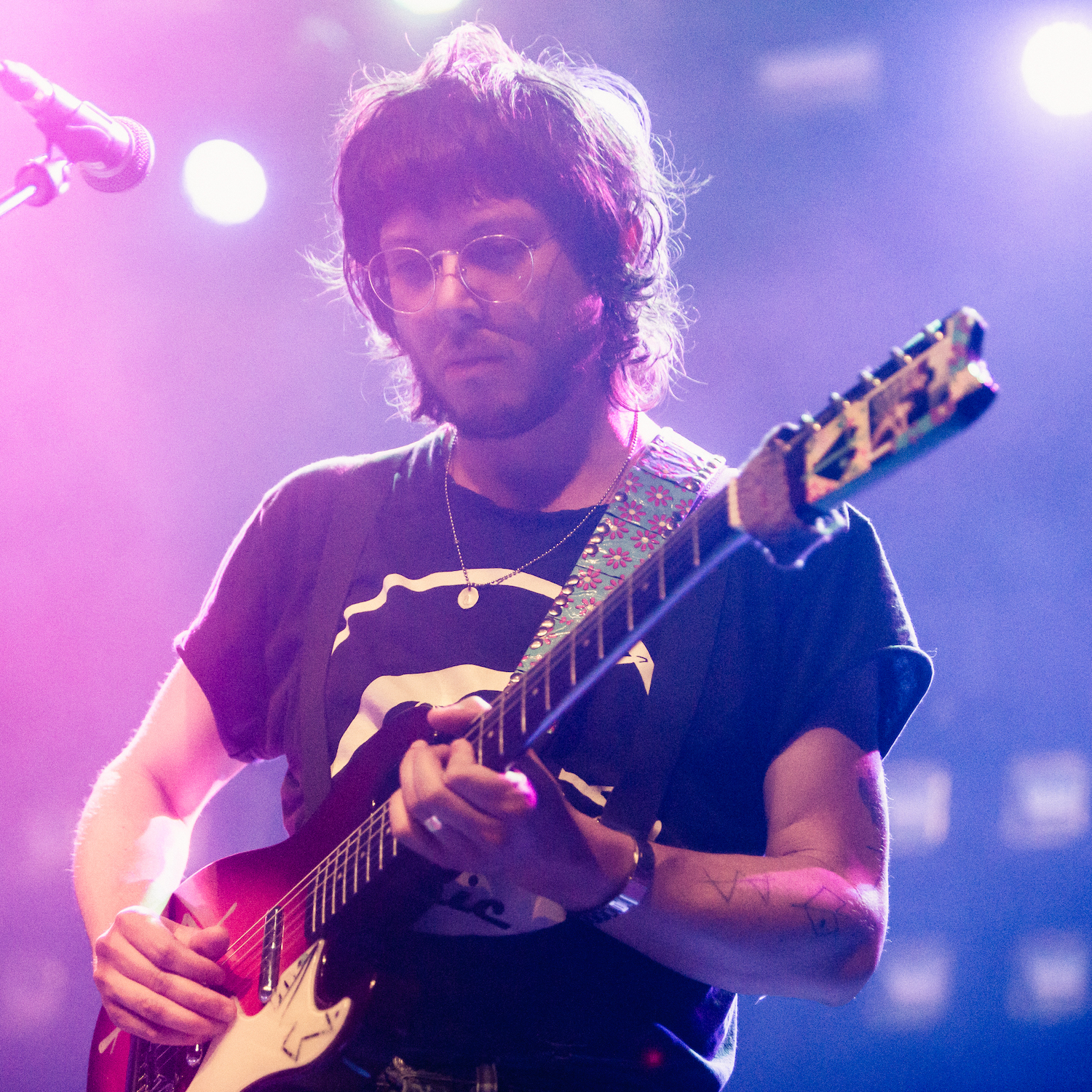
- Hollingsworth performing with Conor Oberst and the Mystic Valley Band in 2017

Background information
- Born: May 11, 1980 (age 46)
- Origin: Birmingham, Alabama, United States
- Genres: Rock, punk, psychobilly
- Occupations: Guitarist, singer-songwriter
- Instrument: Guitar
- Years active: 2002–present
- Labels: Team Love, Fat Possum, Skybucket, Mass, Brash
- Website: Taylor Hollingsworth

Taylor Hollingsworth (born May 11, 1980) is a guitarist, singer-songwriter and artist from Birmingham, Alabama. Hollingsworth is also a member of Conor Oberst and the Mystic Valley Band and Dead Fingers, and has toured with Conor Oberst, Maria Taylor, The Dexateens, Monsieur Jeffrey Evans and his Southern Ace's and Verbena.

== Biography ==
Hollingsworth purchased his first guitar at age 14, shortly after his father died. After starting and playing in a variety of bands including Verbena and The Dexateens, he began gaining notoriety in 2002 with the now-defunct Taylor and the Puffs. "Taylor and the Puffs" released Skybucket Records' first band recording You Know That Summer's Comin' in 2003.

In 2005, Hollingsworth released Tragic City, a "gritty sludge-fest of a record," "recalling everyone from Alice Cooper to Dinosaur Jr. ... to T. Rex and early Tom Petty and the Heartbreakers." His next album, Bad Little Kitty was released on July 29, 2008. The album was later nominated in the 8th Annual Independent Music Awards for "College Record Label Album of the year" in 2009.

Hollingsworth was among several musicians, including Nik Freitas, Jason Boesel, Macey Taylor, and Nate Walcott to travel to Tepoztlán, Mexico in 2007 to contribute to Bright Eyes' Conor Oberst's new solo recordings. Conor Oberst and the Mystic Valley Band released 3 records during their 2007–2010 run, with Hollingsworth contributing several original songs as well as cover of "Central City" from his album, Bad Little Kitty that was rerecorded for the band's 2012 release One of My Kind.

Life with a Slow Ear came out on Oberst's Team Love Records label in November 2009. Paste called the album, which was recorded with Andy LeMaster, "a scrappy, bare-bones production formed out of a love for honest, straightforward rock 'n roll."

Dead Fingers, a duo with wife Kate Taylor, released their first album in 2012 on Fat Possum Records, earning them praise as "the first couple of new Alabama music." As part of their best bands in all 50 states project, Paste Magazine named them one of 12 bands you should know from Alabama for tracks like "Ring Around Saturn" and "Hold on To" that "will bring to mind the collaboration between John Prine and Iris Dement."

SDX (or "Sweet Dog Experience") is a two-piece consisting of Hollingsworth and Craig "Sweetdog" Pickering. They released Pawn and Gun, recorded by Memphis Punk Rock n' Roll Legend, Jack Oblivion in 2013 on Team Love Records.

Dead Fingers released their second album Big Black Dog in 2014. The video for "Shoom Doom Babba Labba" premiered on USA Today September 3, 2014.

Hollingsworth rejoined The Dexateens in 2015 opening for the Drive-by Truckers and the Alabama Shakes.

Hollingsworth toured with Conor Oberst throughout the U.S. and Europe playing in his backing band with members of The Felice Brothers in support of Oberst's recent release, Salutations. On May 11, 2017, they played Oberst's "Too Late to Fixate" on The Late Late Show with James Corden featuring former Beatles collaborator and Traveling Wilburys drummer, Jim Keltner on drums. The Mystic Valley Band reunited for their first time since 2010 for a one-off New Year's Eve show at the Lodge Room in Highland Park, on December 31, 2017. In mid 2018, they announced a 7-date reunion tour through California and Arizona, with special guest Phoebe Bridgers.

In January 2019, Conor Oberst and Phoebe Bridgers released Better Oblivion Community Center's debut studio album featuring only one non-Bridgers-Oberst composition, a cover of Hollingsworth's song "Dominos" from his album "Where To Go, How To Get There, And What You Should Know In Advance." In June 2019, Paste Magazine premiered a new single from Hollingsworth entitled, "Devil N Me," from his new full-length record Tap Dancin' Daddy, out on Flower Moon Records called, calling it "the sound of the blues in 2019." PopMatters premiered the titled track in July, saying it "calls to mind a '70s solo record from former Rolling Stone Bill Wyman or the country colors of Ronnie Lane's Slim Chance." Hollingsworth supported Better Oblivion Community Center on tour in August 2019, as an opener and performing with the band on occasion during their final west coast tour.

He is married to Maria Taylor's sister, singer-songwriter Kate Taylor. They had their first child together, a daughter, in 2012. Hollingsworth's photo, shot by Robert M. Knight hangs on the front of a Guitar Center in Jackson, Mississippi, and Florida.

== Artistry ==
Hollingsworth is also a mixed media artist who has shown his work at Birmingham's "Magic City Art Connection," an annual juried outdoor art show and festival, Artwalk, Moss Rock Festival, and Rojo. At the 2017 "Magic City Art Connection," Hollingsworth was invited to teach an interactive children's "junk art sculpture" class.

== Discography ==
=== Solo ===
- Taylor and the Puffs – You Know That Summer's Comin (2003, Skybucket Records)
- Taylor and the Puffs – On White Out EP (2003, Skybucket Records)
- Taylor Hollingsworth – Shoot Me, Shoot Me Heaven EP (2005, Brash Music)
- Taylor Hollingsworth – Tragic City (2006, Brash Music)
- Taylor Hollingsworth – Bad Little Kitty (2008, Mass Music)
- Taylor Hollingsworth – Life with a Slow Ear (2008, Team Love Records)
- Taylor Hollingsworth – Where To Go, How To Get There, And What You Should Know in Advance (2011, Catapult)
- Taylor Hollingsworth – Knifer (2016, Lo-fi, Lo-life)
- V/A – Flower Moon Records Friends and Family Volume 1 (2018, Flower Moon Records)
- Taylor Hollingsworth – Tap Dancin' Daddy (2019, Flower Moon Records)
- Taylor Hollingsworth – Country Visions (2020)

=== Other projects ===
- Monsieur Jeffrey Evans and his Southern Ace's – Lord Keep Me Sanctified (2008, Big Legal Mess)
- Conor Oberst – Conor Oberst (2008, Merge Records)
- Conor Oberst – Gentleman's Pact (2008, Merge Records)
- Conor Oberst and the Mystic Valley Band – Outer South (2009, Merge Records)
- Conor Oberst and the Mystic Valley Band – One of My Kind (2012, Merge Records)
- Dead Fingers – Dead Fingers (2012, Fat Possum Records)
- Dead Fingers / Nik Freitas – Another Planet / A Million Ways Split 7" (2012, Affairs of the Heart)
- SDX – Pawn and Gun (2013, Team Love Records)
- Dead Fingers – Big Black Dog (2014, Communicating Vessels)

=== Appearances ===
- Preston Lovinggood – Sun Song (2013) – Producer
- \\GT// - Beats Misplaced (2015, Rough Trade Records) – Producer
- Better Oblivion Community Center (2019, Dead Oceans)

== Television and film appearances ==
- Dog the Bounty Hunter – Taylor Hollingsworth – "I'm A Runaway (New Orleans)"
- Electrick Children – Taylor Hollingsworth – "Damn Boy" and "Keep Comin' Back"

=== TV Performances ===
- The Tonight Show with Jay Leno – Conor Oberst and the Mystic Valley Band – "Get Well Cards" (2008)
- The Late Late Show with Craig Ferguson – Conor Oberst and the Mystic Valley Band – "Moab" (2008)
- Late Night with Conan O'Brien – Conor Oberst and the Mystic Valley Band – "Nikorette" (2008)
- The Late Late Show with Craig Ferguson – Conor Oberst and the Mystic Valley Band – "Cape Canaveral" (2008)
- Late Night with David Letterman – Conor Oberst and the Mystic Valley Band – "Spoiled" (2009)
- The Late Late Show with James Corden – Conor Oberst ft. The Felice Brothers and Jim Keltner – "Too Late to Fixate" (2017)
