= Nik Freitas =

American singer-songwriter

Nik Freitas is a singer-songwriter from Visalia, California and currently residing in Los Angeles. Freitas began his career as a staff photographer for Thrasher Magazine until turning his attention to music full-time in 2001. Since then, Freitas has released four records, almost all of which were produced entirely by him (he plays every instrument). Early in his career, he played with For Stars, a group signed to Future Farmer Records, the label which released his first two records. Stylistically similar to musicians like The Beatles, Paul Simon and Elliott Smith, his fourth album, Sun Down was released in 2008 by Conor Oberst's Team Love Records. He has also participated with Oberst's back-up band, the Mystic Valley Band, performing two of his own songs on their debut album Outer South. He has been part of the performing band for the Broken Bells on their tour and also tours as a solo act.

== Discography ==
- Here's Laughing At You, 2002, Future Farmer.
- Heavy Mellow, 2003, Future Farmer.
- Voicing the Hammers, 2006, self-released.
- Shoe Bee Do Bop, 2007, self-released.
- Sun Down, 2008, Team Love.
- Center of the World, 2010, Team Love.
- Saturday Night Underwater, 2011, Little Record Company (US), Affairs of the Heart (Europe).
- The Asterisk, 2013, self-released.
- New To Here, 2015, self-released.
- Day & Dark, 2018, self-released.
