= Ben Brodin =

American musician, engineer and producer

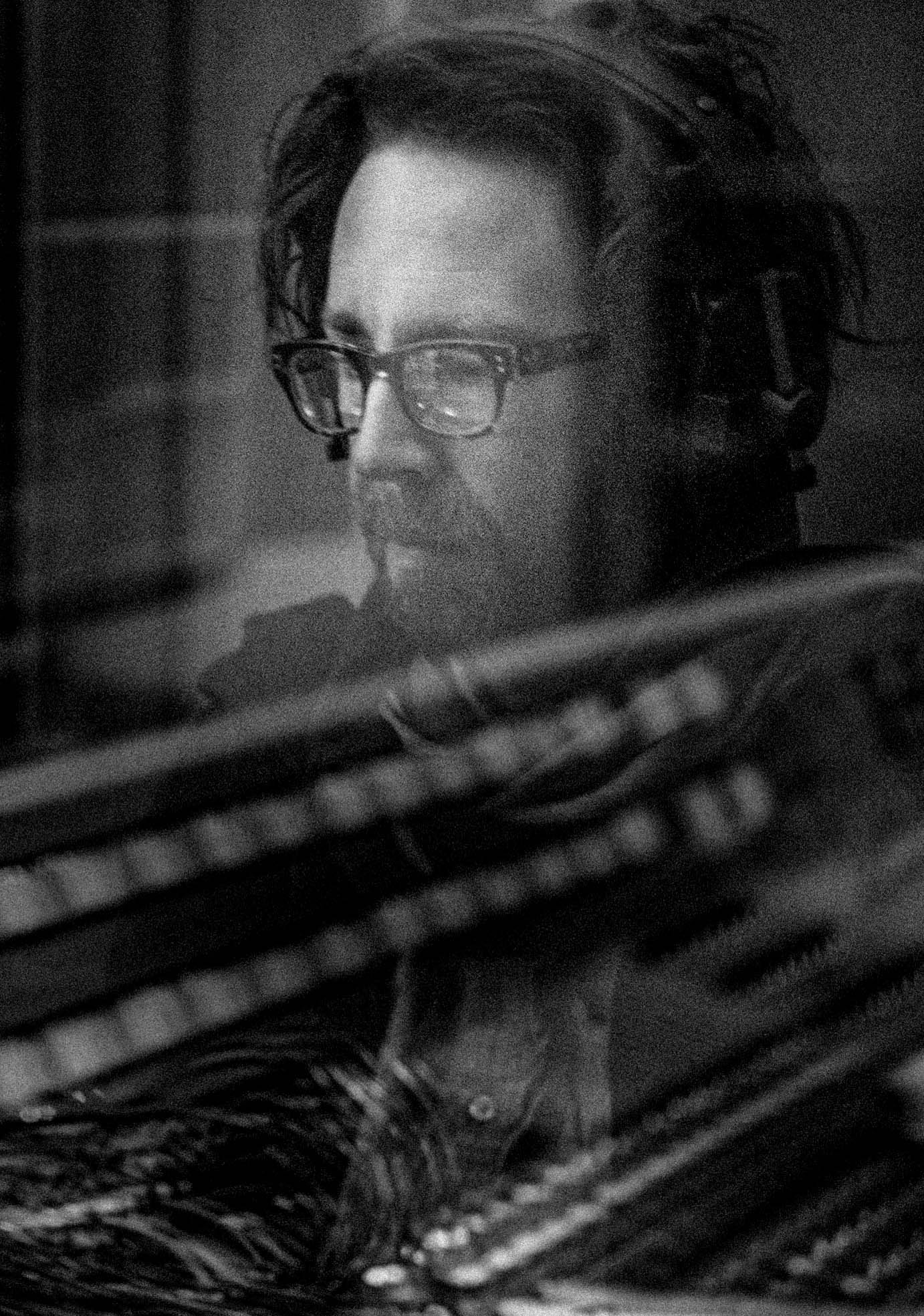

Background information
- Born: January 5, 1979 (age 46); Minneapolis, Minnesota, U.S.
- Genres: Indie rock, folk, pop
- Instruments: keyboards, vibraphone, guitar, bass, drums
- Website: www.benbrodin.com

Ben Brodin is a music producer, recording and mix engineer, composer, and multi-instrumentalist from Omaha, Nebraska. He is a member of several bands, including Mal Madrigal, McCarthy Trenching, Our Fox and The Mynabirds, and has performed both live and in the studio with artists such as Conor Oberst and First Aid Kit. Brodin is a recording engineer at ARC Studios, formerly Presto! Recording Studios, and his own Hand Branch Studio.

== Discography ==
- Cat Piss – Cat Piss Rides Again (2022, Mishap Records) -recording and mix engineer
- Simon Joyner – Songs From A Stolen Guitar (2022, Grapefruit Records, BB*ISLAND) -recording engineer, B3, Wurlitzer, vibraphone
- Little Brazil – Just Leave (2022, Max Trax) -production, recording and mix engineer, bassVI, B3
- Seahaven – Halo DLX (2022, Pure Noise Records) -recording and mix engineer
- Megan Siebe – Swaying Steady (2021, Grapefruit Records) -production, recording and mix engineer, drums, bass, B3, Wurlitzer, piano, electric guitar, percussion
- Dream Regime – Figures In The Clouds (2021, Self) -mix engineer
- Danni Lee – Truth Teller (2021, Self) -production, instrumentation, recording and mix engineer
- Noah James Gose – Monowi (2021, Self) -recording and mix engineer
- Justin Carter – Colossus Drift (2021, Self) -recording and mix engineer
- Tom Kutilek – Beginner's Luck (2020, Self) -recording and mix engineer, B3
- Seahaven – Halo of Hurt (2020, Pure Noise Records) -recording engineer
- Staffers – In The Pigeon Hole (2020, Ever/Never) -mix engineer
- Stavro – Akoma: Songs For Greek America (2020, Toyroom) -recording and mix engineer, production
- Owen Meany's Batting Stance – Featherweights (2020, LHM) -mix engineer
- Ben Eisenberger – Soloists (2020, Plastic Miracles) -mix engineer
- Jim Schroeder – Mesa Buoy (2020, Self) -recording and mix engineer
- John Laughlin – Ten Years, Linked In (2020, Self) -recording and mix engineer, B3
- The Wandering Hearts – Over Your Body (2020, Decca Records) -keyboards
- The Bruces – The Bruces (2020, Unread Records) -mix engineer
- The Lowest Pair – The Perfect Plan (2020, Team Love Records) -piano, B3, Wurlitzer, Mellotron
- Avi Kaplan – I'll Get By (2020, Fantasy Records) -piano, B3, Wurlitzer, Mellotron
- InDreama – Poison House (single) (2020, Self) -recording engineer
- Big Nope – Back To You (2020, Self) -recording and mix engineer
- Kyler Daron – A Room Of Painted Glass (2020, Self) -mix engineer
- Field Club – Saint June b/w Another Midnight (2020, Self) -recording and mix engineer
- Eddy Mink – Open Container Heart Surgery (2020, Self) -recording engineer
- Ben Sasso – Carousel (2020, Dolphin Camp) -recording and mix engineer, production
- Stavro – Chances (2019, Self) -recording and mix engineer, production
- Avi Kaplan – Aberdeen (single) (2019, Self) -piano, keyboards
- James VanDeuson – Dilation (2019, Self) -recording and mix engineer, production, drums, bass, keyboards, guitars
- Hussies – Fast (2019, Self) -recording and mix engineer
- Bazile Mills – Holiday (2019, Self) -recording and mix engineer
- Taylor Janzen – Shouting Matches (2019, 2mm) -B3, Mellotron, Wurlitzer
- Earnhardt – Earnhardt (2019, Self) -recording and mix engineer, production, B3, guitar
- Bad Self Portraits – Amsterdam (2019, Self) -mix engineer
- Jack McLaughlin – Covered In Black (2019, Self) -recording and mix engineer, bass
- Pro Magnum – Knight Speed (2019, Max Trax) -recording and mix engineer
- Blake Rave – Dreams and Fears (2019, Self) -recording and mix engineer, production, drums, bass, keyboards, guitar
- The Wildwoods – Across A Midwest Sky (2019, Self) -recording and mix engineer, production
- Wrong Pets – Fucked Up b/w We Have To (2018, Max Trax) -recording and mix engineer
- The Bruces – Thieves in the Wick (2018, Grapefruit Records) -mix engineer, piano, keyboards
- Citizen Electrical – Archive Spinoffs (2018, Gertrude Tapes) -mix engineer
- Wolfie's Just Fine – Perfection, Nevada (2018, Normal Guy) -piano, B3, Wurlitzer, pump organ
- Pile – Odds and Ends (2018, Exploding In Sound) -recording and mix engineer
- David Nance Group – Placed and Slightly Pulverized (2018, Trouble In Mind) -mix engineer
- Chy – Atlantica (2018, Capotista) -mix engineer
- Audrey Edris – All The Bad Things (2018, Self) -recording and mix engineer, drums, bass, keyboards, guitar
- Mr. E & The Stringless Kite – Seeds (2018, Self) -recording engineer
- The Ruralists – The Birth Of Birds (2018, Self) -mix engineer
- Little Brazil – Send The Wolves (2018, Max Trax Records) -recording and mix engineer
- Ben Eisenberger – Three Islands (2018, Self) -mix engineer
- Staffers – Torn Between Two Loves (2018, Unread Records) -mix engineer
- Anna McClellan – Yes and No (2018, Father/Daughter Records) -production, recording and mix engineer, bass, B3, guitar
- High Up – You Are Here (2017, Team Love Records) -B3, Clavinet, piano
- Refrigerator – High Desert Lows (2017, Shrimper Records) -mix engineer
- The Wildwoods – Birdie and Gose (2017, Self) -recording and mix engineer
- The Lupines – Mountain of Love (2017, Self) -recording and mix engineer
- The Wildwoods – Sweet Nostalgia (2017, Self) -recording and mix engineer, production, B3, guitar
- N.W. Engbers – The Inner World (2017, Self) -recording and mix engineer, production, B3, guitars
- Bell Mine – Bell Mine (2017, Self) -mix engineer
- Simon Joyner – Step Into The Earthquake (2017, Shrimper Records) -recording and mix engineer, Mellotron, vocal
- David Nance – Do The Negative Boogie (2017, Ba Da Bing Records) -recording and mix engineer, Rhodes
- Justin Townes Earle – Kids In The Street (2017, New West Records) -piano, B3, Wurlitzer, Clavinet, vibraphone, percussion
- See Through Dresses – Horse Of The Other World (2017, Tiny Engines) -recording engineer
- Pile – A Hairshirt of Purpose (2017, Exploding In Sound) -recording and mix engineer
- Tim Kasher – No Resolution (2017, 15 Passenger Records) -recording engineer, mix engineer
- High Up – High Up (2017, Team Love Records) -recording and mix engineer
- Rake Kash – Rake Kash (2016, Gertrude Tapes) -mix engineer
- Miwi La Lupa – Beginner's Guide (2016, Tiger Shrimp) -recording engineer, piano, Rhodes, vibraphone
- Conor Oberst – Tachycardia b/w Afterthought (2016, Nonesuch Records) -recording engineer
- Timecat – Through The Roof (2016, Self) -recording and mix engineer
- Bazile Mills – Where We Are (2016, Self) -recording and mix engineer
- Conor Oberst – Ruminations (2016, Nonesuch Records) -recording engineer
- Pro Magnum – Desinfactar (2016, Self) -recording and mix engineer, B3
- Oquoa – In Oneir (2016, Self) -recording and mix engineer
- Jump The Tiger – Nightlife (2016, Self) -recording and mix engineer
- Simon Joyner & The Ghosts – Why Don't You Come Back Around (2016, Ricordo) -recording and mix engineer
- Joseph – I'm Alone, No You're Not (2016, ATO Records) -piano, B3, Mellotron
- Ruston Kelly – Halloween (2016, Razor and Tie) -piano, B3
- David Nance – More Than Enough (2016, Ba Da Bing Records) -mix engineer
- Noah's Ark Was A Spaceship – Three (2016, Self) -recording and mix engineer
- Miwi La Lupa – Ended Up Making Love (2016, Team Love Records) -recording engineer, Wurlitzer, B3, piano, Mellotron
- Sam Martin – Get With The Programmed (2016, Self) -mix engineer
- Katie Burns – Weighted Balloon (2016, Self) -production, recording and mix engineer, drums, bass, keyboards, guitar
- Conor Oberst – Lean On Me, "Life on Normal Street" (2015, Amazon) -production, recording and mix engineer, drums, bass, electric guitar, B3, vocals
- McCarthy Trenching – More Like It (2015, Sower Records) -recording and mix engineer
- High Up – Two Weeks (single) (2015, Self) -recording and mix engineer
- Oh Lazarus – Good Times (2015, Off Label) -mix engineer
- See Through Dresses – End Of Days (2015, Tiny Engines) -mix engineer
- Anna McClellan – Fire Flames (2015, Majestic Litter) -recording and mix engineer, drums, bass, guitars, keyboards, vibraphone
- Pro Magnum – Pro Magnum (2015, Dom) -recording and mix engineer, B3
- Falls – Omaha (2015, Verve Records) -assistant engineer, piano
- The Good Life – Everybody's Coming Down (2015, Saddle Creek Records) -recording engineer
- Orenda Fink – 7” Mighty Mist (2015, Saddle Creek Records) — recording and mix engineer, drums, bass, piano, guitars, vibraphone, samples, vocals, arrangement
- Desaparecidos – Payola (2015, Epitaph Records) -recording engineer
- Orenda Fink – Ace of Cups (2015, Saddle Creek Records) -production, recording and mix engineer
- The Good Life – Novena On A Nocturn (Demo Tapes) (2015, Saddle Creek Records) -mix engineer
- Icky Blossoms – Mask (2015, Saddle Creek Records) -assistant engineer, drum editing
- Pile – You're Better Than This (2015, Exploding In Sound) -recording and mix engineer
- Simon Joyner – Grass, Branch and Bone (2015, Woodsist) -recording and mix engineer, piano, B3, percussion
- Josh Hoyer – Living By The Minute (2014, Silver Street) -recording and mix engineer
- Jason Mraz – Yes! (2014, Atlantic Records) — assistant engineer, drums, percussion, piano, organ
- Orenda Fink – Blue Dream (2014, Saddle Creek Records) — production, recording and mix engineer, guitars, bass, keyboards
- First Aid Kit – Stay Gold (2014, Columbia Records) — assistant engineer, piano, organ, vibraphone
- Conor Oberst – Upside Down Mountain (2014, Nonesuch Records) — vibraphone
- Katie Burns – Throw The Flowers Down (2014, Self) — production, recording and mix engineer, guitar, piano, vibraphone
- Seahaven (band) – Reverie Lagoon: Music For Escapism Only (2014, Run For Cover Records) — recording and mix engineer, guitar, trumpet, organ, vibraphone, bells
- Brad Hoshaw – Funeral Guns (2014, Self) — mix engineer
- John Davis – Spare Parts (2013, Shrimper Records/Riot Act) — recording engineer
- PRO-MAGNUM – 7" (2013, TBA) — recording and mix engineer
- Savages – TBA (2013, Matador Records) — recording engineer
- News For Lulu – Circles (2014, Urtovox) — recording and mix engineer, guitars, vibraphone
- Jake Bellows – New Ocean (2013, Saddle Creek Redcords) — recording and mix engineer, drums, guitars, mellotron, Hammond B-3, piano, vocals
- Jake Bellows – Help [EP] (2013, Majestic Litter) — recording and mix engineer, drums, guitars, keyboards, vocals
- Our Fox – Sea Glass (2013, Majestic Litter) — recording and mix engineer, drums, keyboards, guitar, vibraphone, vocals
- Noah’s Ark Was A Spaceship – You Need You (2013, Self) — recording engineer
- Mal Madrigal – All The Ghosts (2013, TBA) — drums, bass, vibraphone, Hammond B-3, vocals
- Ted Stevens Unknown Project – ‘Singles’ (2013, TBA) — mix engineer, guitars, keyboards
- Ladyfinger (ne) – Errant Forms (2013, Saddle Creek Records) — Hammond B-3, Wurlitzer
- Big Harp – Chain Letters (2013, Saddle Creek Records) — recording engineer
- UUVVWWZ – The Trusted Language (2013, Saddle Creek Records) — recording engineer
- Chromafrost – The End of Instinct (2013, Death Ray) — recording and mix engineer
- The Fucking Party – The Fucking Party (2013, Self) — recording and mix engineer
- Elizabeth Davis – Latitudes (2013, Self) — recording and mix engineer, production, drums, bass, guitars, vibraphone, keys
- Maria The Mexican – Moon Colored Jade (2013, Self) — mix engineer
- Katie Burns – You’ll Find Your Way (2013, Self) — recording and mix engineer, production, guitars, vibraphone, piano, percussion
- CatsMelvin – Houston (2013, Self) — mix engineer
- Tilly and the Wall – Heavy Mood (2012, Team Love Records) — recording engineer
- Azure Ray – As Above So Below (2012, Saddle Creek Records) — guitar samples
- Simon Joyner – Ghosts (2012, Sing, Eunuchs!, Ba Da Bing Records) — mix engineer
- McCarthy Trenching – Plays The Piano (2012, Slumber Party) — recording and mix engineer
- Con Dios – There’s a Beat in Your Cold Black Heart (2012, Self) — recording and mix engineer
- The So-So Sailors – Young Hearts (2012, No Dancing) — recording and mix engineer, Hammond B-3
- Conduits – Conduits (2012, Team Love Records) — recording engineer
- First Aid Kit – The Lion’s Roar (2012, Wichita) — piano
- One Eye White – For Better For Worse (2012, Self) — recording and mix engineer
- Dirty Fluorescents – Cut The Line (2012, Self) — recording and mix engineer, mastering
- Custom Catacombs – Self-Titled (2012, TBA) — recording engineer
- McCarthy Trenching – Fresh Blood (2011, Slumber Party) — recording and mix engineer
- Man Man – Life Fantastic (2011, Anti Records) — assistant engineer
- The Bruces – (TBA) — marimba
- Bright Eyes – The People’s Key (2011, Saddle Creek Records) — assistant engineer
- Kevin Pike/John Kotchian – Pulse/Flow (2011, Bocca Lupo) — mastering
- Film Streams – Silents in Concert Series (various) — composition and arrangement, piano, guitars, tape loops, sound reinforcement
- Before the Toast and Tea – Methods of the Mad (2010, Bocca Lupo) — composition and arrangement, recording/mixing, mastering, drums, guitars, keyboards, bass, vocals, vibraphone, percussion
- Orenda Fink – Ask The Night (2009, Saddle Creek Records) — upright bass, pump organ
- Mal Madrigal – From The Fingers of Trees (2009, Bocca Lupo) — drums, organ, vibraphone, feedback
- Pete Yorn – Back and Forth (2009, Columbia Records) — organs, piano, vibraphone
- Son Ambulance – Someone Else’s Déja Vu (2008, Saddle Creek Records) — vibraphone
- Mal Madrigal – The Road is Glue (2007, Bocca Lupo) — vibraphone, drums
- Mal Madrigal – Life Among The Animals (2007, Bocca Lupo) — vibraphone, drums, Rhodes
