= The Dexateens =

Five-piece rock and roll band from Tuscaloosa, Alabama

- Origin: Tuscaloosa, Alabama United States
- Genres: Southern rock, punk rock, punk blues
- Years active: 1998–present
- Labels: Cornelius Chapel; Skybucket; Estrus
- Members: Elliott McPherson; Matt Patton; Brian Gosdin; John Smith
- Past members: Craig "Sweet Dog" Pickering; Craig Gates; Lee Bains III; Nikolaus Mimikakis; Taylor Hollingsworth; Brad Armstrong; Ronnie Lee Gipson
- Website: Dexateens.org

The Dexateens are a five-piece rock and roll band out of Tuscaloosa, Alabama.

== History ==
=== 1998-2010 ===
The Dexateens began as a five-piece band in 1998 in Tuscaloosa, Alabama, with co-lead singer-songwriters and guitarists Elliott McPherson, John Smith, and Craig Gates, with drummer Craig "Sweet Dog" Pickering and bassist Matt Patton rounding out the group. Patton pulls double duty, as he is also a full-time member of the Drive-By Truckers, with whom The Dexateens have toured in the past. In its earliest form, the band was known for its punk shows at The Chukker and Egan's.

McPherson said The Dexateens' name originated from a guitar pick Smith's brother/roommate had signed by Dexter Romweber, "DEX," which subliminally stuck with him when thinking up names for the band. Once they had the name, they tried to change it to something else (The Highwatts, Red Dirt Five, Sweet Dog) but the name stuck.

Starting in 2004 with their debut self-titled record, The Dexateens have released two albums on Estrus Records and three albums Skybucket Records. Their 2004 self-titled debut and 2005 followup, Red Dust Rising, were both produced by Tim Kerr (Big Boys, Poison 13, Jack O'Fire, Lord High Fixers).

In 2006, The Dexateens released the EP, Teenager, on Dell'orso Records. The record is made up of material from 2000 and consists of the band's earlier punk rock sound.

2007's full-length record, Hardwire Healing, features the acoustic song "Nadine," a song notable for its portrayal of devastation. The record features artwork by Jimmi Hole and was mastered by JJ Golden. Patterson Hood (Drive-By Truckers) and David Barbe co-produced the record, which was recorded in Athens, Georgia, at Chase Park Transduction Studios. Also in 2007, original Dexateens drummer Craig "Sweet Dog" Pickering left the band and Brian Gosdin joined the band on drums.

In 2008, the band released the record, Lost and Found, on Skybucket Records. It was initially released as a free digital download with a purchase-able physical product released later. They recorded 2009's Singlewide with Tim Kerr producing over a three-day period in Birmingham. The artwork is by Mike Egan.

In 2008, Brad Armstrong (13ghosts) joined the band, also on guitar and backing vocals.

They appeared at the 2009 Austin City Limits Music Festival.

In 2010, singer-songwriter and guitarist John Smith left the band. In July 2010, The Dexateens announced the band was disbanding.

=== 2013-present ===
In 2013, the band returned from a two-year hiatus with the EP Sunsphere, which is named after the Knoxville, Tennessee, observation tower that was built for the 1982 World's Fair.

Teenage Hallelujah was released October 7, 2016. McPherson said the record is inspired by the C.S. Lewis novel The Screwtape Letters. The record was recorded in 2011 in McPherson's barn and was produced and engineered by Bronson Tew (Seratones, Jimbo Mathus, Water Liars), and features liner notes by WFMU's Kevin Nutt. Teenage Hallelujah was a shift for the band, as guitarist and vocalist Lee Bains moved on to work on his own band, Lee Bains III and the Glory Fires. The band welcomed the addition of Taylor Hollingsworth (Dead Fingers, Conor Oberst and the Mystic Valley Band) on lead guitar and backing vocals.

A new record called Struggler was reportedly tracked at Dial Back Sound Studios in Water Valley, MS in 2017. The band reunited as a four piece with original member, guitarist and songwriter John Smith at Heathens Homecoming 2020 in Athens, GA and recorded a live album. It was released in 2020. They have played a few intermittent shows as a four piece since the release of the live album.

== Cornelius Chapel Records ==
In 2013, the band started the record label, Cornelius Chapel Records, which McPherson and the extended band family run. Bands on the label, in addition to The Dexateens, include Beitthemeans, Brad Armstrong, Vulture Whale, AdamAdam, Chooglin, The Blips, The Bohannons, Will Stewart, Taylor Hollingsworth, Janet Simpson and Sarah Lee Langford.

== Other projects ==
In addition to the record label, McPherson works as a cabinet-maker and woodworker in Tuscaloosa. He is involved in various music projects including the band Rattler and has a solo project he is working on. The rest of the band members are also involved in various bands.

== Current band members ==
- Elliott McPherson, vocals and guitar
- Matt Patton, bass
- Brian Gosdin, drums
- John Smith, vocals and guitar

== Discography ==
Albums

- 2004: The Dexateens (Estrus Records)
- 2005: Red Dust Rising (Estrus Records)
- 2007: Hardwire Healing (Skybucket Records)
- 2008: Lost and Found (Skybucket Records)
- 2009: Singlewide (Skybucket Records)
- 2016: Teenage Hallelujah (Cornelius Chapel Records, CCR/009)
- 2020: "Live from Athens, GA - Heathens Homecoming 2020 (Cornelius Chapel Records)

EPs

- 2006: Teenager (Dell'orso Records)
- 2013: Sunsphere (Cornelius Chapel)

Compilations

- 1999: A Fistful of Rock N' Roll Vol. 2 (Tee Pee) − "Teenagers Piss Off" a.k.a. "Teenager"
- 2005: Boxcars on 1st, Vol. I − "Talladega Tornado"
- 2009: Lake Fever Sessions (Tugboat Productions (video) / Lake Fever Productions (audio)) − "Down Low," "Missionary Blues," "New Boy"
- 2010: The Country Way Digital Vol. 1 (American Songwriter) − "Granddaddy's Mouth"

Video

- "We Have Signal: Dexateens, Birmingham, AL". We Have Signal: Live from Birmingham, Alabama Public Television. The Bottletree Cafe, Birmingham, Alabama: PBS. January 2009.
- Hanninen, Paavo (director); McPherson, Elliott (producer); Lollar, Shane (sound) (October 28, 2009). "The Dexateens present Old Bryce".
  - Old Bryce: "part 1 of 3". YouTube. Archived from the original on December 21, 2021. "part 2 of 3". YouTube. Archived from the original on December 21, 2021. "part 3 of 3". YouTube. Archived from the original on December 21, 2021.
- Kacker, John (July 2010). "The Dexateens "Live at the Nick" Full Release". YouTube. The Nick (Birmingham, AL). Archived from the original on December 21, 2021.
