= Better Oblivion Community Center (album) =

2019 studio album by Better Oblivion Community Center

Studio album by Better Oblivion Community Center
- Released: January 24, 2019
- Recorded: June 2018
- Studio: Fivestar
- Genre: Folk rock; soft rock
- Length: 37:18
- Label: Dead Oceans
- Producer: Phoebe Bridgers; Conor Oberst; Andy LeMaster

Conor Oberst chronology
| Salutations (2017) | Better Oblivion Community Center (2019) |

Phoebe Bridgers chronology
| Boygenius (2018) | Better Oblivion Community Center (2019) | Punisher (2020) |

Better Oblivion Community Center is the only studio album by American indie rock duo Better Oblivion Community Center, composed of Conor Oberst and Phoebe Bridgers. The album was released on January 24, 2019, through Dead Oceans.

== Background and recording ==
Bridgers and Oberst wrote and recorded the album in secret in Los Angeles in mid- to late 2018.

== Music and themes ==
Writing for Rolling Stone, Will Hermes called its music "soft rock for hard times", while Pitchfork's Sam Sodomsky called it a "tight-knit folk-rock album".

The album is a loose concept album about the Better Oblivion Community Center, a fictional dystopian wellness facility.

== Release and promotion ==
The album had an elaborate rollout featuring cryptic brochures and a telephone hotline. They performed "Dylan Thomas" on The Late Show with Stephen Colbert on January 23, 2019. The album was released the next day.

On January 29, 2019, the band announced their initial concert tour of the United States and Europe along with releasing a music video for their initial single, "Dylan Thomas", directed by Michelle Zauner of the band Japanese Breakfast.

== Critical reception ==
Professional ratings
Aggregate scores
| Source | Rating |
|---|---|
| AnyDecentMusic? | 7.6/10 |
| Metacritic | 78/100 |
Review scores
| Source | Rating |
| AllMusic | 3.5/5 stars |
| Clash | 8/10 |
| Consequence of Sound | B |
| DIY | 4/5 stars |
| Exclaim! | 8/10 |
| The Guardian | 3/5 stars |
| The Line of Best Fit | 8/10 |
| NME | 4/5 stars |
| Pitchfork | 7.7/10 |
| Rolling Stone | 4/5 stars |

Better Oblivion Community Center has received generally positive reviews from critics. At Metacritic, which assigns a normalised rating out of 100 to reviews from mainstream publications, the album received an average score of 78, based on 24 reviews.

Writing for Rolling Stone, Will Hermes said, "The duo harmonize beautifully, Oberst's voice often just a brooding floorboard creak behind Bridgers' brightly bloodshot confidences". David Sackllah of Under the Radar said, "This is a cohesive, creative, and multi-faceted record that will over-joy fans of both artists while offering the spark of magic that so rarely comes with these kinds of collaborations." Sam Walker-Smart of Clash praised the album, stating "its depth, brave sonic choices and chemistry make for a near perfect record. Rather than sticking purely with the sad acoustic vibes, the album effortlessly blends country, electro elements and alt-rock with ease. It's as if the LP was simultaneously recorded in 2018, 2007, and 1993, a tonal greatest hits of hard-hitting emotion and fist-pumping fun." Sarah Murphy of Exclaim! gave the album 8/10, stating "The best parts of the album... are the moments where it doesn't sound exactly like anything either artist has released before."

== Accolades ==
| Publication | Accolade | Rank | Ref. |
|---|---|---|---|
| Exclaim! | Top 29 Albums of 2019 (Mid-Year) | 9 | |
| Stereogum | Top 50 Albums of 2019 (Mid-Year) | 14 | |

== Track listing ==
| No. | Title | Writer(s) | Length |
|---|---|---|---|
| 1. | "Didn't Know What I Was in For" | Phoebe Bridgers; Conor Oberst | 4:03 |
| 2. | "Sleepwalkin'" | Bridgers; Oberst | 3:12 |
| 3. | "Dylan Thomas" | Bridgers; Oberst | 3:36 |
| 4. | "Service Road" | Bridgers; Oberst | 3:44 |
| 5. | "Exception to the Rule" | Bridgers; Oberst | 2:51 |
| 6. | "Chesapeake" | Bridgers; Oberst; Christian Lee Hutson | 4:04 |
| 7. | "My City" | Bridgers; Oberst | 4:04 |
| 8. | "Forest Lawn" | Bridgers; Oberst; Hutson | 3:46 |
| 9. | "Big Black Heart" | Bridgers; Oberst; Adam McIlwee; Ben Walsh | 3:26 |
| 10. | "Dominos" | Taylor Hollingsworth | 4:32 |
| Total length: | | | 37:18 |

== Personnel ==
Credits adapted from the album's liner notes.

=== Better Oblivion Community Center ===
- Phoebe Bridgers – production (all tracks), vocals (1–10), guitar (1–4, 6–8), electric piano (2), baritone guitar (9, 10), photography
- Conor Oberst – production (all tracks), vocals (1–10), guitar (1, 2, 4, 7–9), baritone guitar (3), piano (4, 10), keyboards (5), Whirly tube (7), photography

=== Additional contributors ===
- Andy LeMaster – production, engineering (all tracks); synthesizer (1, 5, 6), bass guitar (1); programming, pocket piano, Mellotron (5); samples (10)
- John Congleton – mixing (all tracks), synthesizer (3)
- Bob Ludwig – mastering
- Christian Lee Hutson – EBow (1), tambourine (3), guitar (6, 8), pocket piano (6)
- Carla Azar – drums (1, 3, 5, 10), percussion (1, 10)
- Griffin Goldsmith – drums, percussion (2, 4, 7, 8, 9)
- Wylie Gelber – bass guitar (2, 4, 7, 8, 9)
- Nick White – keyboard (2)
- Nick Zinner – guitar (3, 10)
- Anna Butterss – bass guitar (3, 5), upright bass (10)
- Nathaniel Walcott – synthesizer (6)
- Marshall Vore – percussion (9)
- Taylor Hollingsworth – sampled voice (10)
- Nik Freitas – photography
- Nathaniel David Utesch – design, layout

== Charts ==
| Chart (2019) | Peak position |
|---|---|
| Belgian Albums (Ultratop Flanders) | 20 |
| Dutch Albums (Album Top 100) | 117 |
| Scottish Albums (OCC) | 35 |
| UK Albums (OCC) | 76 |
| UK Americana Albums (OCC) | 2 |
| UK Independent Albums (OCC) | 4 |
| US Top Album Sales (Billboard) | 23 |
| US Top Alternative Albums (Billboard) | 18 |
| US Americana/Folk Albums (Billboard) | 7 |
| US Heatseekers Albums (Billboard) | 2 |
| US Independent Albums (Billboard) | 4 |
| US Top Rock Albums (Billboard) | 41 |
| US Indie Store Album Sales (Billboard) | 5 |
| US Vinyl Albums (Billboard) | 3 |
