= Nate Walcott =

American musician (born 1978)

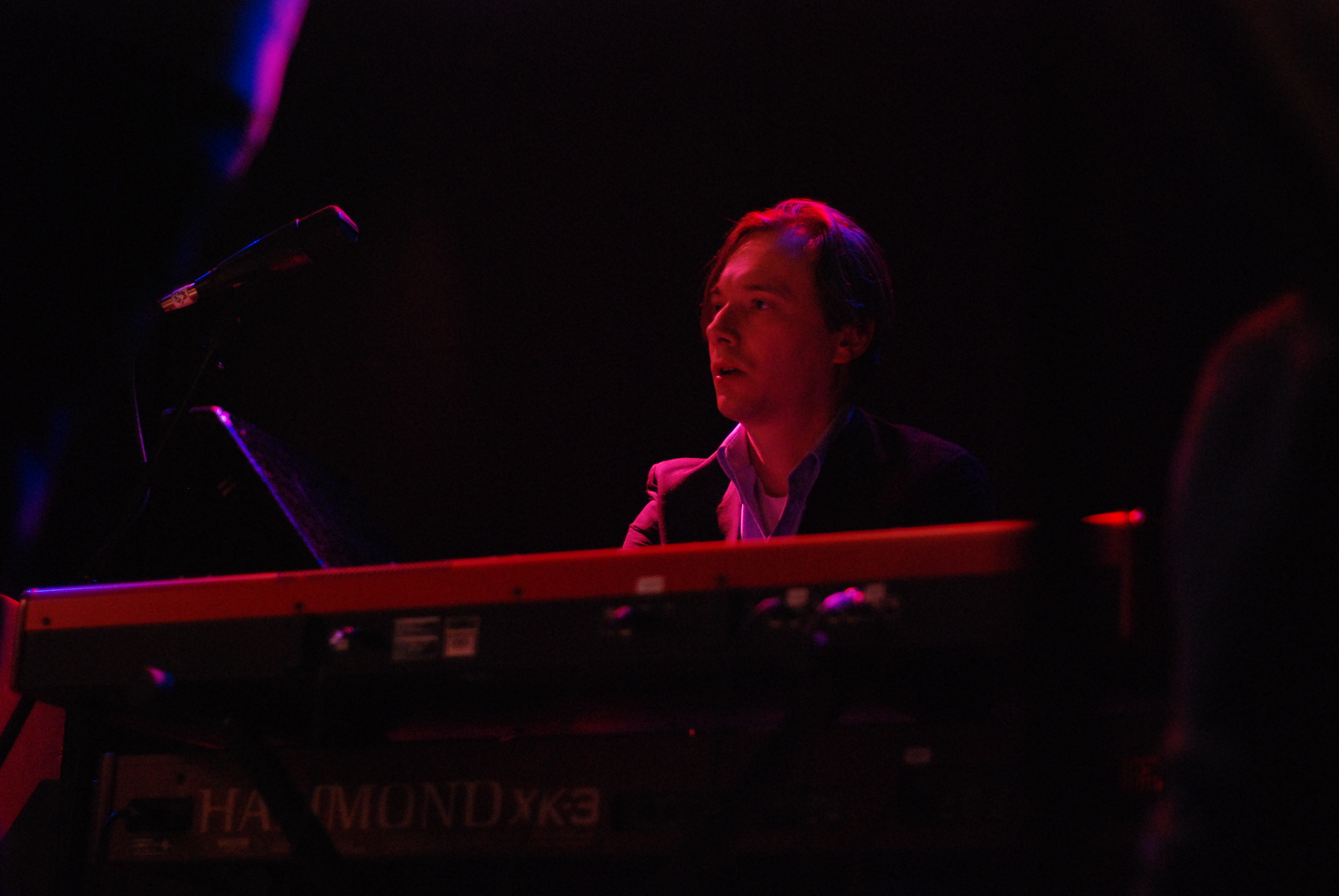
- Walcott with Bright Eyes in 2007

Background information
- Born: March 6, 1978 (age 48); Albany, New York, U.S.
- Genres: Rock, indie rock, experimental, new-age, film score
- Occupations: Musician, composer, arranger
- Instruments: Piano, keyboards, trumpet
- Member of: Bright Eyes
- Formerly of: Red Hot Chili Peppers, Broken Bells, The Glenn Miller Orchestra

Nathaniel Walcott (born March 6, 1978) is an American musician, composer and arranger. He is a member of the band Bright Eyes, and has played in Conor Oberst's Mystic Valley Band and with singer-songwriter M. Ward. Between 2016 and 2019, Walcott was the touring pianist and keyboard player for the Red Hot Chili Peppers, during their The Getaway World Tour.

Walcott has also toured with the likes of the James Mercer and Danger Mouse-led group Broken Bells, Rilo Kiley, and the Glenn Miller Orchestra. In the studio, he has performed on the albums of such artists as Phoebe Bridgers, She & Him, U2, Beck, Jason Mraz, Maroon 5, and the Shins and has contributed arrangements to artists such as Mavis Staples, Angel Olsen, First Aid Kit, Jenny Lewis, Rilo Kiley, Pete Yorn, Cursive, and The Faint. He has also composed the scores for films such as The Fault in Our Stars and Regretting You.

== Life and career ==
Walcott was born on March 6, 1978, in Albany, New York. While he was a young child, his family moved to the Central New York village of East Homer. When Walcott was eight, his family moved to Lincoln, Nebraska.

While a high school student in Lincoln, Walcott played in several Lincoln-based bands, including Kid Quarkstar, with longtime friend and future Maroon 5 guitarist James Valentine. He also met musicians Mike Mogis, A.J. Mogis, and Ted Stevens of Lincoln-based band Lullaby for the Working Class, with whom he recorded and toured.

After graduating from high school in 1996, Walcott went on to attend DePaul University in Chicago. He took time off from his studies to tour both with The Glenn Miller Orchestra and Lullaby for the Working Class.

After university, Walcott engaged in freelance recording, arranging, and performing work with a very wide variety of artists including the Chicago-based groups Las Guitarras de Espana, the Mighty Blue Kings, and Pinetop Seven. He was also active in the improvisational and "experimental" music scene, performing with the likes of David Boykin, Mike Reed, and Keefe Jackson at such places as Fred Anderson's Velvet Lounge, the Hungry Brain, and the Green Mill, and also led his own group, the Nate Walcott Octet. While living in Chicago, both in college and after, Walcott remained connected to Nebraska, working as an arranger and player on records being produced by Mike Mogis for artists such as The Faint, Rilo Kiley, and Johnathan Rice.

While still a student and collaborating with musicians in the vibrant Lincoln and Omaha music scenes, Walcott met singer-songwriter Conor Oberst of the bands Bright Eyes, Commander Venus, and Desaparecidos. Walcott joined Bright Eyes on its tour in support of 2002's album Lifted or The Story is in the Soil, Keep Your Ear to the Ground and also on most subsequent tours after the "Lifted" tour. Walcott played on 2005's studio recordings I'm Wide Awake, It's Morning and Digital Ash in a Digital Urn and the live album Motion Sickness.

In 2006, in preparation for writing and recording Bright Eyes' next album, Walcott, along with Mike Mogis, was named a permanent member of the group. Cassadaga was released on April 10, 2007. Walcott co-wrote "Coat Check Dream Song." Following a five-month tour of the United States, Walcott wrote the arrangements for the band's appearance at the Hollywood Bowl with the Los Angeles Philharmonic Orchestra.

Walcott followed up the Cassadaga tour by collaborating with Oberst (along with Nik Freitas, Taylor Hollingsworth, Macey Taylor, and Jason Boesel) on his solo efforts, 2008's Conor Oberst and 2009's Outer South. The group came to be known as the Mystic Valley Band as a nod to the location of the 2008 recording, a villa named Valle Mistico in Tepoztlán, Morelos, Mexico.

In 2010, Walcott toured as music director and multi-instrumentalist for Broken Bells, an innovative collaboration between James Mercer and Danger Mouse. Later that year, he returned to the studio with Oberst and Mogis to record the next Bright Eyes album. The People's Key was released on February 15, 2011. Walcott co-wrote the song "Approximate Sunlight." Highlights of his time with Bright Eyes over the years include numerous tours of North and South America, Europe, Asia, and Australia, and performances at such venues as New York City's Radio City Music Hall and London's Royal Albert Hall.

In recent years, Walcott has done extensive freelance recording and arranging work, including with She & Him, U2, Beck, Jenny Lewis, First Aid Kit, Rilo Kiley, the Shins, and Maroon 5. He has also maintained a busy freelance performing schedule with the likes of M. Ward, Eleni Mandell, The Living Sisters, Jonathan Wilson, Harper Simon, and Zavalaz, a new band led by Cedric Bixler-Zavala of The Mars Volta. Walcott has continued to occasionally join Conor Oberst during his recent solo performances, including his November 2013 performance at Carnegie Hall.

As of 2016, Walcott is touring with the Red Hot Chili Peppers on their The Getaway World Tour, playing piano, keyboards, and trumpet. He is featured on their 2016 Live In Paris EP.

Over the years, Walcott has lived in Chicago, Omaha, Brooklyn, and Los Angeles, where he now resides.

== Film scores ==
Year	Title	Director(s)	Studio(s)	Notes
2008	Lovely, Still	Nicholas Fackler	Monterey Media	Co-composed with Mike Mogis
2012	Stuck in Love	Josh Boone	Millennium Entertainment	Co-composed with Mike Mogis
2014	Song One	Kate Barker-Froyland	The Film Arcade; Cinedigm	Additional music; score by Jenny Lewis and Johnathan Rice
2014	The Fault in Our Stars	Josh Boone	20th Century Studios	Co-composed with Mike Mogis
2016	Neighbors 2: Sorority Rising	Nicholas Stoller	Universal Pictures	Additional music; score by Michael Andrews
2016	Come and Find Me	Zack Whedon	Saban Films	—N/a
2018	Midnight Sun	Scott Speer	Global Road Entertainment	—N/a
2020	The New Mutants	Josh Boone	20th Century Studios	Additional music; score by Mark Snow
2025	Regretting You	Josh Boone	Paramount Pictures; Constantin Film	—N/a

== Selected album appearances ==
- She & Him – Classics (2014 · Columbia Records)
- Beck – Song Reader (2014 · Capitol Records)
- U2 – Songs of Innocence (Deluxe) (2014 · Island Records)
- Jenny Lewis – The Voyager (2014 · Warner Bros. Records)
- Conor Oberst – Upside Down Mountain (2014 · Nonesuch Records)
- First Aid Kit – Stay Gold (2014 · Columbia Records)
- Broken Bells – After the Disco (2014 · Columbia Records)
- Stuck in Love Original Motion Picture Soundtrack (2013 · Varèse Sarabande)
- Rilo Kiley – Rkives (2013 · Little Record Company)
- First Aid Kit – The Lion's Roar (2012 · Wichita Recordings)
- Conor Oberst and the Mystic Valley Band – One of My Kind (2012· Team Love)
- Bright Eyes – The People's Key (2011 · Saddle Creek)
- Conor Oberst and the Mystic Valley Band – Outer South (2009· Merge Records)
- Conor Oberst – Conor Oberst (2008 · Merge Records)
- Bright Eyes – Cassadaga (2007 · Saddle Creek)
- Cursive – Happy Hollow (2006 · Saddle Creek)
- Tilly and the Wall – Bottoms of Barrels (2006 · Team Love)
- Bright Eyes – I'm Wide Awake, It's Morning (2005 · Saddle Creek)
- Bright Eyes – Digital Ash in a Digital Urn (2005 · Saddle Creek)
- The Faint – Wet From Birth (2004 · Saddle Creek)
- Rilo Kiley – More Adventurous (2004 · Brute/Beaute)
- Red Hot Chili Peppers – Live In Paris EP (2016 · Deezer)
- Pluralone – To Be One With You (2019 · ORG Music)
- Phoebe Bridgers – Punisher (2020 · Dead Oceans)
- Red Hot Chili Peppers – Unlimited Love (2022 · Warner Bros. Records)
- Flea – Honora (2026 · Nonesuch)
