= Park Ave. (band) =

American indie pop band

- Origin: Omaha, Nebraska
- Genres: Indie rock, indie pop, twee pop, bubblegum pop, lo-fi
- Years active: 1996-1999
- Label: Saddle Creek
- Past members: Conor Oberst; Clark Baechle; Jenn Bernard; Neely Jenkins; Jamie Williams

Park Ave. was an indie pop band that started in January 1996 in Omaha, Nebraska.

The band lasted only two and a half years, but still retains a substantial fanbase. During their short time together, Park Ave. (named after an actual street in their hometown of Omaha, Nebraska) received rave reviews for their brand of indie pop music. The band was born out of members' desire to write pop, almost bubblegum pop, music.

None of the members could play their respective musical instruments prior to forming the band. Conor Oberst had been playing guitar since a very young age, yet played drums in the band. Clark Baechle had played drums previously, but played guitar for Park Ave. Park Ave. performed about 10-15 times during its existence. When Jamie Pressnall, née Williams, moved to London to work in art, the band broke up, hence the name of their 1999 album—When Jaime Went to London...We Broke Up. Before Pressnall went to London, they recorded songs on a 4-track as a record for themselves. The recordings were later released to become their first and only album.

When Pressnall returned from London, she and Jenkins reunited in Tilly and the Wall, which also included Nick White, Kianna Alarid, and Derek Pressnall. Conor Oberst has a successful career as Bright Eyes as well as Desaparecidos, Mystic Valley Band, Better Oblivion Community Center and Monsters of Folk, while Clark Baechle is the drummer of The Faint.

== Band members ==
- Clark Baechle (guitar, vocals)
- Jenn Bernard (keyboards, vocals)
- Neely Jenkins (bass guitar, vocals)
- Conor Oberst (drums, vocals)
- Jamie Pressnall (guitar, vocals)

== Discography ==
When Jamie Went to London... We Broke Up (1999 - Urinine Records)

Although the original pressing of When Jamie Went To London...We Broke Up went out of print due to Urinine Records' closure, Team Love Records re-pressed it in late 2005.

The Wrens/Park Ave. Split 7" (1998 - Saddle Creek Records)

== See also ==
- Bright Eyes
- Desaparecidos
- The Faint
- Tilly and the Wall
- Commander Venus
