= Broken Hearts & Dirty Windows: Songs of John Prine =

Compilation album by Various artists
- Released: June 21, 2010
- Genre: Country music
- Length: 44:00
- Label: Oh Boy Records

Broken Hearts & Dirty Windows: Songs of John Prine is a 2010 tribute album consisting of covers of John Prine songs performed by various artists. The album was released on June 21, 2010, together with the Prine album In Person & On Stage, on the label Prine started in 1981, Oh Boy Records. The album's title is a reference to a lyric from the Prine song "Souvenirs". Justin Vernon, lead singer of Bon Iver, wrote some of the liner notes for the album, in which he describes his first time hearing Prine's music as a kid in his parents' car. A follow-up "Volume 2" was released in 2021, a year and a half after Prine's death from COVID-19.

== Reception ==
The album met with mostly positive reviews upon its release, though Allison Stewart criticized it for excluding some of Prine's best songs and the musicians on the album for being "overly reverent." Another lukewarm review came from PopMatters' Andrew Gilstrap, who wrote that "By and large, the various treatments on Broken Hearts don’t rock the boat too much. The vibe is far too amiable for anyone to strike out on a quest to provide their own definitive version of a Prine song." A similar criticism was offered by Ken Tucker, who wrote that most of the bands on the album perform Prine's songs with "flat-footed awe" and criticized the album as "dreary".

Professional ratings
Review scores
Source	Rating
Allmusic	3.5/5 stars
Alternative Press	3.5/5 stars
The A.V. Club	B+
MSN Music (Expert Witness)	(choice cut)
Paste	8/10
Pitchfork Media	6.8/10
Rolling Stone	3/5 stars
The Washington Post	(positive)
Uncut	4/5 stars

== Track listing ==
All tracks are written by John Prine.

No.	Title	Performing artist	Length
1.	"Bruised Orange (Chain of Sorrow)"	Justin Vernon
2.	"Wedding Day in Funeralville"	Conor Oberst and the Mystic Valley Band
3.	"All the Best"	My Morning Jacket
4.	"Mexican Home"	Josh Ritter
5.	"Six O'Clock News"	Lambchop
6.	"Far From Me"	Justin Townes Earle
7.	"Spanish Pipedream"	The Avett Brothers
8.	"Angel from Montgomery"	Old Crow Medicine Show
9.	"The Late John Garfield Blues"	Sara Watkins
10.	"Daddy's Little Pumpkin"	Drive-By Truckers
11.	"Unwed Fathers"	Liz Isenberg/Deer Tick
12.	"Let's Talk Dirty in Hawaiian"	Those Darlins
Total length:			44:00
