= Conor Oberst (album) =

Studio album by Conor Oberst
- Released: August 4, 2008
- Recorded: January – February 2008 at Valle Mistico
- Genres: Folk rock, indie folk, country rock
- Length: 42:00
- Label: Merge Records
- Producer: Conor Oberst

Conor Oberst chronology
The Soundtrack to My Movie (1996)	Conor Oberst (2008)	Gentleman's Pact (2008)

Conor Oberst is the fourth solo studio album by Conor Oberst, of the band Bright Eyes, which was released on August 4, 2008 by Merge Records. The album debuted on the UK Albums Chart at No. 37 and reached No. 15 on the Billboard Top 200. It sold 98,000 copies in the US as of August 2009.

== Production ==
The album was recorded in Tepoztlán, Morelos, Mexico between January and February 2008. A temporary studio was created in a mountain villa called Valle Místico at the outskirts of town. Conor Oberst was produced by Conor Oberst and engineered by long-time associate Andy LeMaster. A new band was assembled for the recording, which came to be known as The Mystic Valley Band. The result is Oberst's fourth solo album, and his first in twelve years, following Water (1993), Here's to Special Treatment (1994) and The Soundtrack to My Movie (1996). In that time he has recorded and performed in many bands and musical projects including Commander Venus, Park Ave., Desaparecidos, and most notably Bright Eyes. The song "Moab" was number 31 on Rolling Stone's list of the 100 Best Songs of 2008.

== Track listing ==
All songs by Conor Oberst, except where noted.

1. "Cape Canaveral" – 4:04
2. "Sausalito" – 3:10
3. "Get-Well-Cards" – 3:33
4. "Lenders in the Temple" – 4:35
5. "Danny Callahan" – 3:58
6. "I Don’t Want to Die (In the Hospital)" – 3:32
7. "Eagle on a Pole" – 4:42
8. "NYC - Gone, Gone" – 1:11
9. "Moab" – 3:36
10. "Valle Místico (Ruben’s Song)" (Ruben Mendez Hernandez) – 0:49
11. "Souled Out!!!" (Oberst, Jason Boesel) – 3:32
12. "Milk Thistle" – 5:21

== Critical reception ==
Professional ratings
Review scores
Source	Rating
AllMusic	3.5/5 stars
Billboard	(not rated)
Crawdaddy!	(favorable)
Drowned in Sound	8/10
Paste	80/100
Pitchfork Media	7.3/10
Rolling Stone	3.5/5 stars
Spin	3.5/5 stars
The Times	4/5 stars
Time	A−

Entertainment Weekly said that on the album, "Conor sounds like Bright Eyes, only heightened--brighter, if you will: He's emo balladeer, country rocker, and ferocious folkie rolled into one."

== Track information ==
- The seventh track, "Eagle on a Pole", was inspired by a comment made by Sean Foley who said, "I saw an eagle on a pole. I think it was an eagle." Simon Joyner, friend and mentor of Oberst, said that line would be great for a song, which planted the seed for others in the band to write a song from the line. Oberst's version is on this record. Jason Boesel's version is on the second album released by the Mystic Valley Band, Outer South.

== Personnel ==
- Conor Oberst – guitar, vocals, electric guitar (5), 12-string guitar (9), stomp (8)
- Nate Walcott – organ (3, 4), piano (5, 6), electric piano (7, 8, 9)
- Nik Freitas – electric guitar (2, 5, 7, 8, 9, 11), vocals (3, 4, 5, 8, 9)
- Macey Taylor – bass (2, 3, 5, 6, 7, 8, 9, 11), vocals (2), stomp (8)
- Taylor Hollingsworth – guitar (3), electric guitar (6), vocals (8), stomp (8)
- Jason Boesel – drums (2, 3, 5, 6, 7, 8, 9, 11), percussion (2, 9), vocals (3, 7, 8, 9, 11), stomp (8)
- Andy LeMaster – tape echo (11), vocals (3, 4, 8)
- Phil Schaffart – vocals (8), stomp (8)
- Janet Weiss – vocals (6)
- Corina Figueroa-Escamilla – vocals (11)
- Ruben Mendez Hernandez – conch (10)

== Charts ==
Chart (2008)	Peak position
Australian Albums (ARIA)	63
Austrian Albums (Ö3 Austria)	52
Belgian Albums (Ultratop Flanders)	35
Dutch Albums (Album Top 100)	73
German Albums (Offizielle Top 100)	37
Norwegian Albums (VG-lista)	26
Scottish Albums (Official Charts)	39
Swedish Albums (Sverigetopplistan)	40
UK Albums (Official Charts)	37
US Billboard 200	15
US Digital Albums (Billboard)	3
US Top Alternative Albums (Billboard)	3
US Top Rock Albums (Billboard)	3
US Indie Store Album Sales (Billboard)	1
