= Jason Boesel =

American musician (born 1977)

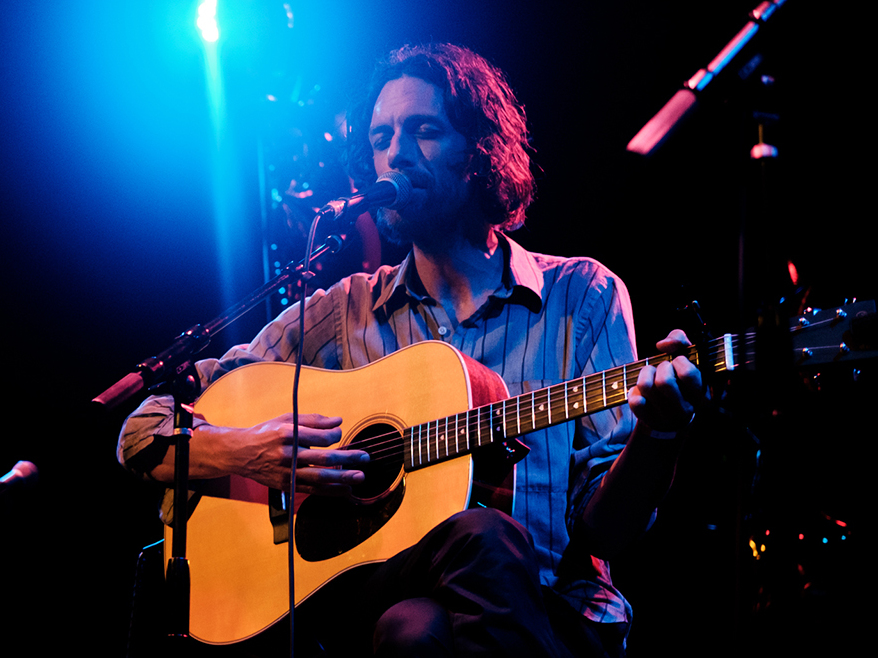
- Boesel performing in 2017

Background information
- Born: August 17, 1977 (age 48); Oahu, Hawaii, United States
- Origin: Anaheim, California, United States
- Occupations: Songwriter, drummer, producer
- Instrument: Drums
- Website: blakemillsonline.com

Jason Lyon Boesel (born August 17, 1977) is an American musician, songwriter and producer based in Los Angeles. He is the drummer for Rilo Kiley and has also played with The Elected and Conor Oberst and the Mystic Valley Band.

== Bands ==
He also drummed in the Bright Eyes touring band during their 2005 tour, and went on to write the liner notes for the consequent Bright Eyes live album, Motion Sickness and contributing to Bright Eyes' 2007 record, Cassadaga. From December 2007, he has played with Bright Eyes' Conor Oberst in Conor Oberst and the Mystic Valley Band, with whom Boesel wrote and sings lead for 2 tracks on their 2009 album Outer South.

On January 12, 2010, Boesel released his debut solo album 'Hustler's Son' via Team Love.

== See ==
- Evergreen
- Ben Lee
- Dawes
- Bright Eyes
- The Elected
- Jenny Lewis with the Watson Twins
- Johnathan Rice
- The Lassie Foundation
- Rilo Kiley
- Conor Oberst and the Mystic Valley Band
- Phases
- Our Lady Peace (appears on "Won't Turn Back" single)
- Allie Crow Buckley

== Album Appearances ==
- Bright Eyes - Lua (Single) (2004 · Saddle Creek)
- Bright Eyes - Take It Easy (Love Nothing) (2004 · Saddle Creek)
- Bright Eyes - I'm Wide Awake, It's Morning (2005 · Saddle Creek)
- Bright Eyes - Digital Ash in a Digital urn (2005 · Saddle Creek)
- Bright Eyes - Motion Sickness (2006 · Team Love)
- Bright Eyes - Four Winds (2007 · Saddle Creek)
- Bright Eyes - Cassadaga (2007 · Saddle Creek)
- Conor Oberst and the Mystic Valley Band - Conor Oberst (2008 · Merge Records)
- Jakob Dylan - Seeing Things (2008 · Capitol)
- Conor Oberst and the Mystic Valley Band - Outer South (2009 · Merge Records)
- The Young Veins - Take A Vacation! (2010 · One Haven Music)
- Jenny & Johnny - I'm Having Fun Now (2010 - Warner Bros.)
- The Elected - Bury Me in My Rings (2011 - Vagrant Records)
- Conor Oberst - Upside Down Mountain (2014 - Nonesuch)
- Springtime Carnivore - Midnight Room (2016 - Autumn Tone Records)
- Ryan Adams - Prisoner (2017 - PaxAm)
- Allie Crow Buckley - Moonlit and Devious (2021)
- Allie Crow Buckley - Moonlit and Devious Alternates EP (2021)
- Allie Crow Buckley - Utopian Fantasy (2023)
- Evergreen (San Diego emo band) Still Life/Evergreen split
- Evergreen (San Diego emo band) Evergreen 7"
- Evergreen (San Diego emo band) Evergreen LP (also named 7 songs)
- Evergreen (San Diego emo band) - These Last Days 7"
