= Allie Crow Buckley =

American musician

Allie Crow Buckley is an American indie folk musician from Los Angeles, California.

== History ==
Buckley released her first EP in 2019 titled So Romantic. In 2021, Buckley released her debut album titled Moonlit and Devious.

Buckley has both collaborated with and opened for Declan McKenna.

Buckley's second full-length album, Utopian Fantasy, was released in 2023.
