= Outer South =

Studio album by Conor Oberst and the Mystic Valley Band
- Released: May 5, 2009
- Recorded: December 2008
- Studio: Sonic Ranch (Tornillo, Texas)
- Genre: Folk rock, indie rock, Americana
- Length: 70:03
- Label: Merge

Conor Oberst and the Mystic Valley Band chronology
| Gentleman's Pact (2008) | Outer South (2009) | Upside Down Mountain (2014) |

Professional ratings
Review scores
| Source | Rating |
|---|---|
| AllMusic | 4/5 stars |
| Blare Magazine | 4/5 stars |
| Drowned in Sound | 8/10 |
| Pitchfork | 4.9/10 |
| Rolling Stone | 3.5/5 stars |
| Sputnikmusic | 2/5 stars |

Outer South is the fifth solo studio album by American musician Conor Oberst and the second to be credited to Conor Oberst and the Mystic Valley Band. It is Oberst's first solo album to include songs written and sung by his bandmates. Nik Freitas, Taylor Hollingsworth and Jason Boesel each contributed two songs apiece, and bassist Macey Taylor sings a song written for him by Oberst. The album was released through Merge Records on May 5, 2009.

The entire album was made available on April 7, 2009, to stream on the Merge Records website for a limited time. It has sold 38,000 units in US.

== Track listing ==
All songs written by Conor Oberst, except where noted.

1. "Slowly (Oh So Slowly)" (Oberst, Nate Walcott) – 3:34
2. "To All the Lights in the Windows" – 5:42
3. "Big Black Nothing" (Nik Freitas) – 3:39
4. "Air Mattress" (Taylor Hollingsworth) – 2:14
5. "Cabbage Town" – 3:50
6. "Ten Women" – 3:22
7. "Difference Is Time" (Jason Boesel) – 5:36
8. "Nikorette" (Oberst, Freitas) – 4:11
9. "White Shoes" – 5:50
10. "Bloodline" (Freitas) – 4:08
11. "Spoiled" – 3:16
12. "Worldwide" (sung by Macey Taylor) – 3:31
13. "Roosevelt Room" – 5:02
14. "Eagle on a Pole" (Boesel) – 4:38
15. "I Got the Reason #2" – 7:15
16. "Snake Hill" (Hollingsworth) – 4:15

=== Track information ===
- The third track, "Big Black Nothing", is blacked out on the CD label, the booklet and the track listing on the back of the physical packaging.
- The twelfth track, "Worldwide", was written by Oberst and given to Macey Taylor to sing.
- The fourteenth track, "Eagle on a Pole", was inspired by a comment made by Sean Foley who said, "I saw an eagle on a pole. I think it was an eagle." Simon Joyner, friend and mentor of Oberst, said that line would be great for a song, which planted the seed for others in the band to write a song from the line. Jason Boesel's version is on this record. Oberst's version is on Conor Oberst.

== Personnel ==
Mystic Valley Band

- Jason Boesel – drums, vocals, lead vocals (7, 14), percussion (11)
- Nik Freitas – electric guitar, vocals, lead vocals (3, 10), acoustic guitar (3, 6, 10), 12-string electric guitar (5), electric piano (15)
- Taylor Hollingsworth – electric guitar, vocals, lead vocals (4, 16), acoustic guitar (8, 16), 12-string acoustic guitar (11)
- Conor Oberst – vocals, acoustic guitar, electric piano (3), 12-string acoustic guitar (4), electric guitar (5, 10, 13, 15)
- Macey Taylor – bass, vocals, lead vocals (12)
- Nathaniel Walcott – organ, electric piano, upright piano, backup vocals (3, 10), synthesizer (4)

Additional personnel

- Andy LeMaster – backup vocals (3, 13, 14)
- Corina Figureoa-Esamilla and Phillip Schaffart – additional backup vocals (3)

== Charts ==
Chart performance for Outer South
| Chart (2009) | Peak position |
|---|---|
| Australian Albums (ARIA) | 96 |
| German Albums (Offizielle Top 100) | 75 |
| Irish Albums (IRMA) | 51 |
| Scottish Albums (OCC) | 63 |
| UK Albums (OCC) | 75 |
| US Billboard 200 | 40 |
| US Top Alternative Albums (Billboard) | 9 |
| US Digital Albums (Billboard) | 12 |
| US Independent Albums (Billboard) | 5 |
| US Top Rock Albums (Billboard) | 12 |
| US Indie Store Album Sales (Billboard) | 2 |
