= Ruminations (album) =

Studio album by Conor Oberst
- Released: October 14, 2016
- Recorded: February 2016
- Studios: ARC Studios, Omaha, Nebraska
- Length: 37:56
- Label: Nonesuch
- Producer: Conor Oberst

Conor Oberst chronology
Upside Down Mountain (2014)	Ruminations (2016)	Salutations (2017)

Professional ratings
Aggregate scores
Source	Rating
Metacritic	76/100
Review scores
Source	Rating
AllMusic	3/5 stars
Consequence of Sound	B−
Drowned In Sound	9/10
NME	4/5 stars
Paste	8.6/10
Pitchfork Media	7.5/10
Rolling Stone	3.5/5 stars
Slant Magazine	4/5 stars

Ruminations is the seventh solo studio album by American musician Conor Oberst, released on October 14, 2016 on Nonesuch Records. An expanded edition of the album featuring five bonus tracks was released on July 23, 2021.

== Background ==
On October 28, 2015, in the midst of Desaparecidos' tour for their second studio album Payola, it was announced that Conor Oberst had been hospitalized due to "laryngitis, anxiety, and exhaustion," according to a press release. The entirety of Desaparecidos' remaining tour dates were cancelled and Oberst returned to his hometown of Omaha to recuperate. Oberst spent the following months in Omaha, where he wrote and recorded the songs that makeup Ruminations.

== Recording ==
The album was recorded in February 2016 at ARC Studios in Oberst's native Omaha, Nebraska, with the recording process taking just two days. The album was engineered by Ben Brodin, mixed by Mike Mogis and mastered by Bob Ludwig.

Described as an acoustic album, the songs on the album solely feature Oberst and consist of vocals, acoustic guitar, piano, and harmonica. In a press release, Oberst described Ruminations' inception:

I wasn't expecting to write a record. I honestly wasn't expecting to do much of anything. Winter in Omaha can have a paralyzing effect on a person but in this case it worked in my favor. I was just staying up late every night playing piano and watching the snow pile up outside the window. Next thing I knew I had burned through all the firewood in the garage and had more than enough songs for a record. I recorded them quick to get them down but then it just felt right to leave them alone.

All ten main tracks and five bonus tracks were re-recorded with a full band for Oberst's following album Salutations.

== Artwork ==
The album artwork features a photograph captured by Julia Brokaw of Oberst playing piano and harmonica with a microphone and sheet music on display, marking the album's low-production and minimal instrumentation.

== Accolades ==
Publication	Accolade	Year	Rank
American Songwriter	Top 50 Albums of 2016	2016	42

== Track listing ==
All tracks are written by Conor Oberst.

Ruminations – Standard edition
No.	Title	Length
1.	"Tachycardia"	3:39
2.	"Barbary Coast (Later)"	4:12
3.	"Gossamer Thin"	3:35
4.	"Counting Sheep"	3:27
5.	"Mamah Borthwick (A Sketch)"	3:56
6.	"The Rain Follows the Plow"	3:28
7.	"A Little Uncanny"	4:12
8.	"Next of Kin"	3:26
9.	"You All Loved Him Once"	3:49
10.	"Till St. Dymphna Kicks Us Out"	4:12
Total length:		37:56

Ruminations – Expanded edition (bonus tracks)
No.	Title	Length
11.	"Overdue"	3:23
12.	"Too Late to Fixate"	4:06
13.	"Afterthought"	3:37
14.	"Empty Hotel by the Sea"	4:48
15.	"Napalm"	5:06
Total length:		59:02

== Charts ==
Chart (2016)	Peak position
Austrian Albums (Ö3 Austria)	54
Belgian Albums (Ultratop Flanders)	103
German Albums (Offizielle Top 100)	82
Irish Albums (IRMA)	31
Scottish Albums (Official Charts)	55
Swiss Albums (Schweizer Hitparade)	77
US Billboard 200	72
