= Conor Oberst and the Mystic Valley Band =

American band

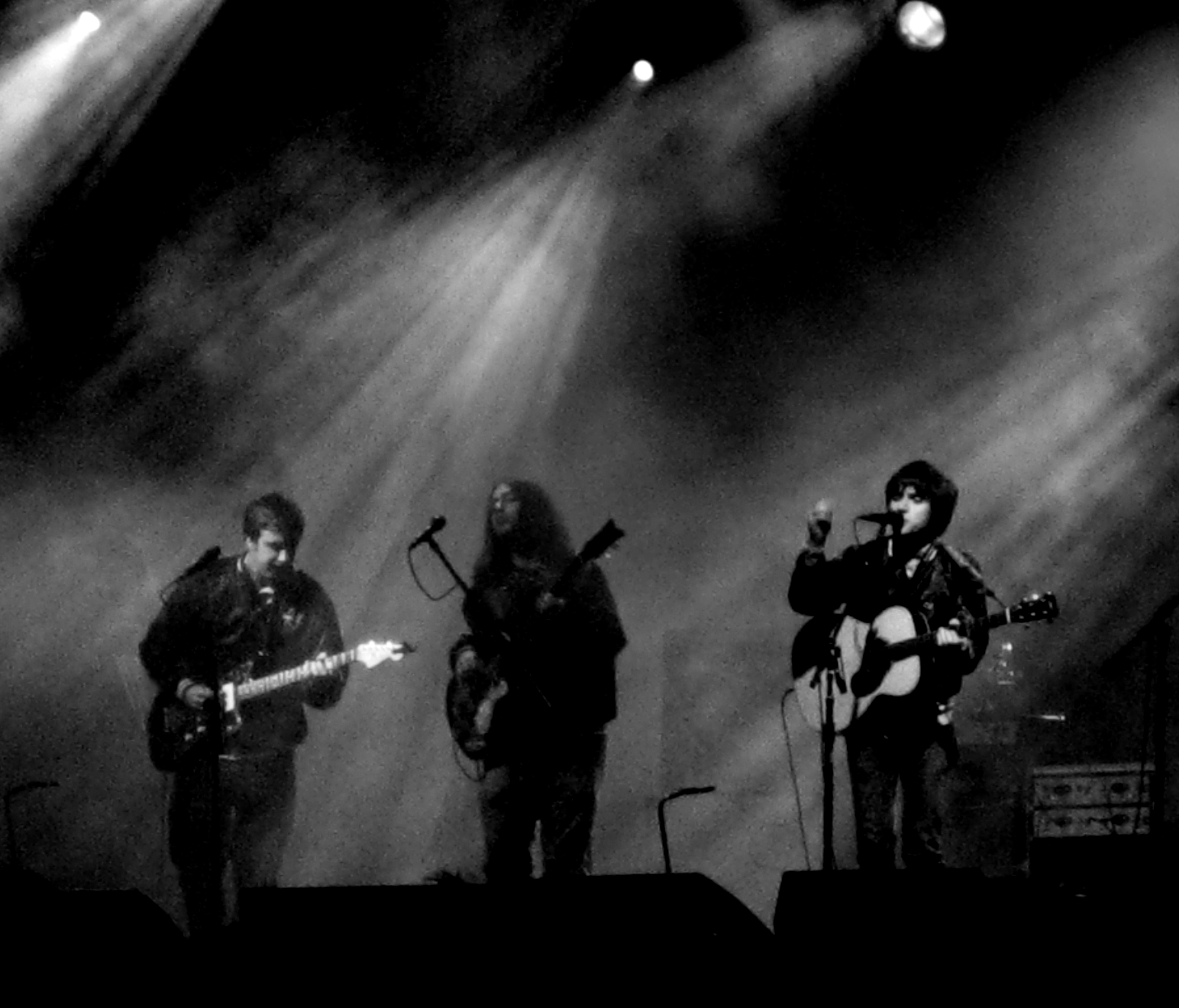
- Conor Oberst and the Mystic Valley Band at the Leeds Festival, 22 August 2008.

Background information
- Origin: Omaha, Nebraska, USA
- Genres: Americana; Alternative Country
- Years active: 2007-2010, 2013, 2017
- Members: Conor Oberst; Nate Walcott; Jason Boesel; Nik Freitas; Macey Taylor; Taylor Hollingsworth
- Website: conoroberst.com

Conor Oberst and the Mystic Valley Band is an American band consisting of Conor Oberst and his backing band. The band is composed of Nik Freitas (guitar), Taylor Hollingsworth (guitar), Macey Taylor (bass), Nate Walcott (keyboards/organ) and Jason Boesel (drums). The band was formed to back Oberst on his 2008 solo album but soon evolved into a band of its own with all members singing and providing songs for 2009's Outer South.

== History ==
In November 2007, it was reported that Oberst would work on a solo record with Jake Bellows, and that he would form a band with M. Ward and perform two shows in late December 2007 in Minneapolis, Minnesota. Contrary to this speculation, the shows were not played with M. Ward, but rather with Nik Freitas and Jason Boesel. (Oberst and M. Ward would, however, later form the group Monsters of Folk, which also includes Mike Mogis of Bright Eyes and Jim James of My Morning Jacket.) The band played 20 new songs and it was announced that these songs were not meant for Oberst's main project, Bright Eyes. In early 2008, Oberst and his band traveled to Tepoztlán, Morelos, Mexico and spent two months living and recording their debut album there. Before leaving the country, the band played a show in Mexico City.

Conor Oberst and the Mystic Valley Band played at the 2008 Reading and Leeds Festivals. In addition, they also performed at Connect Festival in Scotland and the Electric Picnic in Ireland in August 2008, the Austin City Limits festival in September and also at the Great Escape Festival in Sydney, Australia in early October 2008. The debut album, titled Conor Oberst, was released in the UK on Wichita on 5 August 2008 and 6 August 2008 on Merge Records in the U.S., billed as a solo album by Oberst. In October 2008 the band released the Gentlemen's Pact EP (again, billed as a solo effort from Oberst), which was available in limited quantities and sold only at shows.

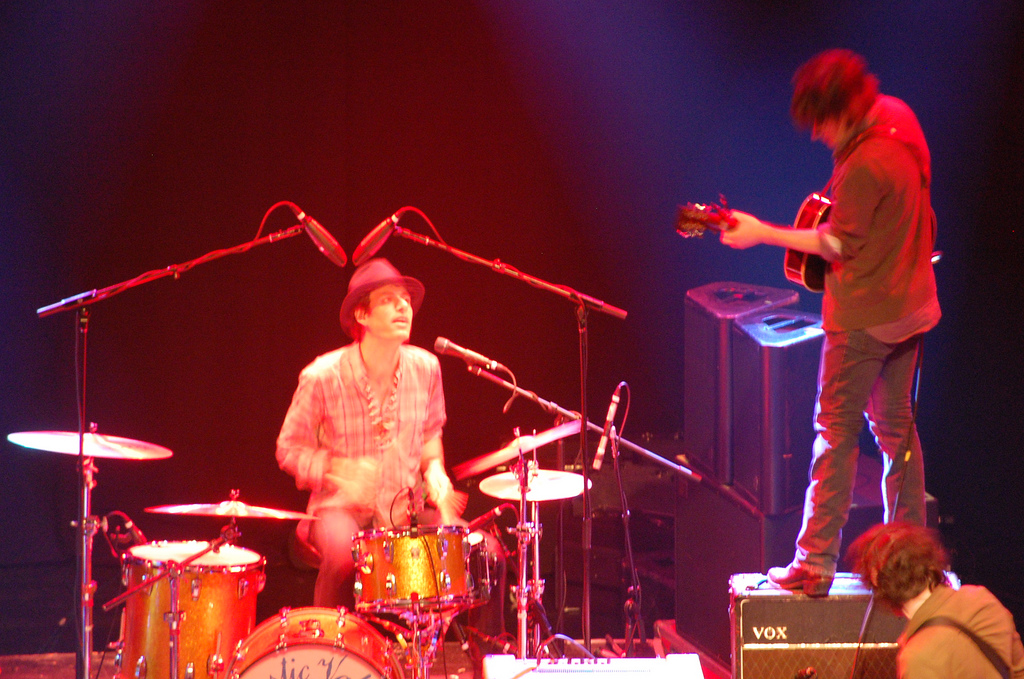
Conor Oberst & the Mystic Valley Band at Terminal 5 in New York City. November 8, 2008

On November 11, 2008, Conor Oberst & the Mystic Valley Band appeared on the Late Night Show with Conan O'Brien and performed a then-unreleased song, "Nikorette", which would later appear on their second album.

Upon completing their touring schedule in late November 2008, the Mystic Valley Band spent time at Sonic Ranch Studios in Tornillo, Texas. There they recorded more than a dozen new songs, many of which had become staples of their live set earlier in the year. On February 19, 2009, it was officially announced that the band's second album, entitled Outer South, would be released on May 5 on Merge Records. A number of the songs that appear on the album are written and sung by band members other than Conor Oberst.

The band began their 2009 tour in Omaha on April 9 and toured through July 2009, with scheduled performances including stops at Coachella Valley Music and Arts Festival and the Telluride Bluegrass Festival.

During their last several shows in southern California, Oberst was quoted to have called the tour "The Nail in the Coffin Tour".

The band played what was presumed to be their final show on August 29, 2009; however on July 23, 2010, the band played with Rage Against the Machine at the latter's first US show in two years at the Hollywood Palladium. The concert benefited Arizona organizations that are fighting the SB1070 immigration law. On the night of the show, a spokesperson projected that the concert had raised $300,000.

In April 2010 it was announced that the Mystic Valley Band would be featured on the John Prine tribute album, Broken Hearts And Dirty Windows: Songs Of John Prine, which was released June 22 on Oh Boy Records.

Conor Oberst and the Mystic Valley Band played shows at the Slowdown in Omaha, Nebraska, on July 31 and August 1 of 2013.

Conor Oberst and the Mystic Valley Band reunited for a single show on December 31, 2017.

== Members ==
- Jason Boesel - drums, percussion, vocals
- Nik Freitas - guitar, vocals
- Taylor Hollingsworth - guitar, vocals
- Conor Oberst - vocals, guitar
- Macey Taylor - bass, vocals
- Nate Walcott - organ, piano, keyboards, synthesizer

== Discography ==
=== Albums ===
- Conor Oberst (released as Conor Oberst) (2008 - Merge Records)
- Outer South (2009 - Merge Records)
- One of My Kind (2012 - Team Love Records)

=== Singles and EPs ===
- Gentleman's Pact EP (released as Conor Oberst) (2008 - self-released)
- "Souled Out!" (2008, Merge Records)
- "Sausalito" (2008, Merge Records)
- "NYC - Gone, Gone" (2008, Merge Records)
- "Nikorette" (2009, Merge Records)

== Film ==
- One of My Kind (2009)

== Music videos ==
- "Souled Out!!!" (2008, directed by Alan Tanner)

== See also ==
- Bright Eyes (band)
