= Salutations (album) =

Studio album by Conor Oberst
- Released: March 17, 2017
- Genre: Folk, folk rock, Americana
- Length: 67:20
- Label: Nonesuch
- Producer: Jim Keltner, Conor Oberst

Conor Oberst chronology
Ruminations (2016)	Salutations (2017)	Better Oblivion Community Center (2019)

Professional ratings
Aggregate scores
Source	Rating
AnyDecentMusic?	7.5/10
Metacritic	81/100
Review scores
Source	Rating
AllMusic	4/5 stars
The Independent	5/5 stars
The Irish Times	4/5 stars
Mojo	4/5 stars
The Observer	4/5 stars
Pitchfork	6.6/10
Q	4/5 stars
Record Collector	3/5 stars
Uncut	8/10
Vice	A−

Salutations is the eighth solo studio album by American musician Conor Oberst, released on March 17, 2017, on Nonesuch Records. Ten of the tracks originally appeared on Ruminations in acoustic form.

== Track listing ==
All tracks are written by Conor Oberst, except as indicated.

No.	Title	Writer(s)	Length
1.	"Too Late to Fixate"		4:01
2.	"Gossamer Thin"		3:33
3.	"Overdue"	Conor Oberst and James Felice	3:48
4.	"Afterthought"		3:35
5.	"Next of Kin"		3:40
6.	"Napalm"		4:57
7.	"Mamah Borthwick (A Sketch)"		4:14
8.	"Till St. Dymphna Kicks Us Out"		3:59
9.	"Barbary Coast (Later)"		4:27
10.	"Tachycardia"		3:25
11.	"Empty Hotel by the Sea"		4:23
12.	"Anytime Soon"	Oberst, Johnathan Rice, Taylor Goldsmith and Jonathan Wilson	2:51
13.	"Counting Sheep"		3:27
14.	"The Rain Follows the Plow"		3:41
15.	"You All Loved Him Once"		4:26
16.	"A Little Uncanny"		4:56
17.	"Salutations"		3:57
Total length:			1:07:20

== Personnel ==
- Pearl Charles – backing vocals (12)
- Daphne Chen – violin (8, 9, 14)
- Richard Dodd – cello (8, 9, 14)
- Greg Farley – violin (1–11, 13–16), backing vocals (1, 3, 4)
- Ian Felice – electric guitar (1–11, 13–16), backing vocals (3, 4, 14, 16)
- James Felice – piano (13–15), organ (6, 10, 11, 13), Wurlitzer (3, 7, 9, 15, 16), accordion (1, 2, 4, 5, 8, 10, 11, 13–15), backing vocals (1, 3, 4, 6, 8, 11, 14)
- Eric Gorfain – violin (8, 9, 14)
- Jim James – backing vocals (2, 3, 10, 14)
- Leah Katz – viola (8, 9, 14)
- Jim Keltner – drums (1–17), percussion (3, 6, 8, 12, 14, 16, 17)
- Andy LeMaster – backing vocals (1, 3, 4, 6, 11)
- Blake Mills – guitar (10), electric guitar (14), baritone guitar (7), guitarrón (7)
- Conor Oberst – vocals (1–17), guitar (4, 7, 9, 11, 13, 15, 16), electric guitar (3, 6, 12), piano (1, 2, 5, 8, 10, 17), Wurlitzer (14), harmonica (1, 2, 4, 5, 7–11, 14–16)
- Josh Rawson – bass (1–11, 13–16), backing vocals (3)
- Gus Seyffert – bass (12, 17)
- Maria Taylor – backing vocals (9, 13)
- M. Ward – guitar (15)
- Gillian Welch – backing vocals (7, 15)
- Jonathan Wilson – guitar (12, 17), piano (12, 17), synthesizer (12, 17)

== Charts ==
Chart (2017)	Peak position
Austrian Albums (Ö3 Austria)	58
Belgian Albums (Ultratop Flanders)	86
Belgian Albums (Ultratop Wallonia)	166
German Albums (Offizielle Top 100)	82
Scottish Albums (OCC)	46
Swiss Albums (Schweizer Hitparade)	89
UK Albums (OCC)	91
US Billboard 200	137
