= Gentleman's Pact =

EP by Conor Oberst
- Released: October 2008
- Genre: Indie rock
- Length: 16:53
- Label: Self-released

Conor Oberst chronology
Conor Oberst (2008)	Gentleman's Pact (2008)	Outer South (2009)

Gentleman's Pact is the first EP by Conor Oberst and the Mystic Valley Band, consisting of four unreleased tracks, two preceding the band's 2008 album Conor Oberst and two preceding it. The EP was exclusively available to purchase at concerts during the 2008 tour, and was limited to an edition of 1,000 physical copies. It was released under the name Conor Oberst.

The EP was included as a pre-order bonus to Oberst's second solo album, Outer South, by iTunes in May 2009.

All of the tracks from this EP were included in the compilation that is bundled with the film One of My Kind.

== Track listing ==
All songs written by Conor Oberst, except where noted.

1. "Gentleman's Pact" – 3:09
2. "Synesthete Song" – 4:39
3. "Corrina, Corrina" (Traditional) – 3:47
4. "Breezy" – 5:18

== Personnel ==
- Conor Oberst – voice and guitar on all tracks, electric guitar on track 1, piano on track 4
- Jason Boesel – drums on tracks 1, 2, 3, guitar on track 4
- Macey Taylor – bass on tracks 1, 2, 3, feedback bass on track 4
- Nate Walcott – organ on tracks 1, 2, porch piano on track 3
- Nik Freitas – electric guitar on track 2
- Andy LeMaster – EBow guitar on track 2, guitar on track 4
- Taylor Hollingsworth – electric guitar on track 3, guitar on track 4
- Philip Schaffart – guitar on track 4

== Track information ==
- The third track, "Corrina, Corrina", is a traditional folk song and has been covered by many musicians, including Bob Dylan.
- The fourth track, "Breezy", was written by Oberst in memory of Sabrina Duim, a harpist and Stanford University graduate who toured with Oberst's band Bright Eyes throughout 2005 and contributed to the Bright Eyes album Digital Ash in a Digital Urn; she died in January 2007.
