= Upside Down Mountain =

Studio album by Conor Oberst
- Released: May 19, 2014
- Genre: Americana, folk rock, indie rock
- Length: 54:17
- Label: Nonesuch
- Producer: Jonathan Wilson and Conor Oberst

Conor Oberst chronology
Outer South (2009)	Upside Down Mountain (2014)	Ruminations (2016)

Upside Down Mountain is the sixth solo studio album by American musician Conor Oberst, released on May 19, 2014, through Nonesuch Records.

The record, according to Oberst, is a return to an earlier style of his songwriting. He explains that the album is about language:

“It’s more intimate or personal, if you will. Even if all my songs come from the same place, you make different aesthetic decisions along the way. For me, language is a huge part of why I make music. I’m not the greatest guitar player or piano player—I’m not the greatest singer, either—but I feel if I can come up with melodies I like that are fused with poetry I’m proud of, then that’s what I bring to the table. That’s why I’m able to do this.”

== Recording ==
Oberst and Jonathan Wilson began recording exploratory demos at Wilson's Fivestar Studios in Echo Park, Los Angeles. Oberst continued recording in his native Omaha, Nebraska with Andy LeMaster at ARC Studios in late 2013. Oberst then rejoined with Wilson to continue recording at Blackbird Studio in Nashville, Tennessee.

== Promotion ==
In support of the album, Oberst toured with Dawes in the spring and summer of 2014. Dawes was also the band backing Oberst during his performances on the tour.

On May 19, 2014, Oberst performed "Zigzagging Toward the Light" with Dawes on The Tonight Show.

== Release ==
Upside Down Mountain was released on May 19, 2014, through Nonesuch Records and is available on CD, vinyl and as a digital download.

On May 11, 2014, the entire album was made available to stream online through NPR's First Listen website.

== Packaging ==
The cover art is a painting by Oberst's friend Ian Felice entitled The Creation of the Bulls.

== Reception ==
=== Critical ===
Professional ratings
Aggregate scores
Source	Rating
Metacritic	75/100
Review scores
Source	Rating
AbsolutePunk	95%
AllMusic	4/5 stars
Consequence of Sound	B
Rolling Stone	4/5 stars

Upside Down Mountain received largely positive reviews from music critics upon its release. At Metacritic, they assign a "weighted average" rating out of 100 to selected independent ratings and reviews from mainstream critics, and the album has received an Metascore of a 75, based on 31 reviews, indicating "generally favorable" reviews.

David Fricke of Rolling Stone rated the album four out of five stars, dubbing it "a sumptuous immersion in Seventies California folk pop...the most immediately charming album he has ever made." At The New York Times, Jon Pareles gave a positive review of the album, stating that Oberst's "new songs are focused and aphoristic, earnestly reflecting on life without getting too precious." In addition, Pareles writes that Oberst's "empathy, his unassumingly natural melodies, the quavery sincerity in his voice, the plain-spoken but telling lyrics that he’s now careful to deliver clearly." Stephen Thomas Erlewine of AllMusic rated the album four out of five stars, calling it "a conscious step toward maturation, both in its studio sculpture - Oberst has never spent so much time laboring over arrangements as he does here - and compositional construction."

=== Commercial performance ===
Upside Down Mountain debuted at No. 19 on the Billboard 200 chart, selling 11,000 copies in its first week. It also debuted at No. 6 on the Top Rock Albums chart and No. 1 on the Folk Albums chart. It marks Oberst's first No. 1 on the Folk Albums chart. The album has sold 39,000 copies in the United States as of September 2016.

== Track listing ==
All songs written by Conor Oberst

No.	Title	Length
1.	"Time Forgot"	4:34
2.	"Zigzagging Toward the Light"	4:03
3.	"Hundreds of Ways"	4:28
4.	"Artifact #1"	4:23
5.	"Lonely at the Top"	3:45
6.	"Enola Gay"	2:22
7.	"Double Life"	3:56
8.	"Kick"	3:39
9.	"Night at Lake Unknown"	4:15
10.	"You Are Your Mother's Child"	3:49
11.	"Governor's Ball"	4:18
12.	"Desert Island Questionnaire"	5:41
13.	"Common Knowledge"	4:59
Total length:		54:17

== Charts ==
Chart	Peak position
Austrian Albums (Ö3 Austria)	39
Belgian Albums (Ultratop Flanders)	54
Belgian Albums (Ultratop Wallonia)	154
Dutch Albums (Album Top 100)	88
German Albums (Offizielle Top 100)	54
Scottish Albums (OCC)	51
Swiss Albums (Schweizer Hitparade)	64
UK Albums (OCC)	55
US Billboard 200	19
US Top Alternative Albums (Billboard)	6
US Digital Albums (Billboard)	13
US Top Rock Albums (Billboard)	6
US Americana/Folk Albums (Billboard)	1

== Personnel ==
Credits adapted from Nonesuch Records:

- Conor Oberst - voice (1–13), guitar (1–13)
- Jonathan Wilson - guitars (1–3, 5–9, 11, 12), percussion (1–3, 7, 8, 11), keyboards (1–3, 7, 8, 12, 13), bass (2, 3, 7, 12), drums (2, 3, 7, 11, 12), voice (2, 3, 11), piano (7), organ (7), glockenspiel (12)
- Andy LeMaster - bass (1), guitar (1, 7), voice (6, 7), percussion (7), drums (7), keyboards (12), backing vocals (3, 13, 14)
- Cully Symington - drums (1, 5–8), percussion (1, 5–8)
- Klara Söderberg, Johanna Söderberg - voice (1, 3, 8, 9, 11)
- Joshua Grange - pedal steel (3, 5, 9)
- Nate Walcott - trumpet (3, 11), piano (6, 11), organ (11), keyboard (11, 12)
- Scott Vicroy - saxophone (3, 11)
- Pete Madsen - trombone (3, 11)
- Blake Mills - guitars (4), keyboards (4), percussion (4), voice (4)
- Macey Taylor - bass (5, 6, 8, 9, 11)
- Orenda Fink - voice (6)
- Ben Brodin - vibraphone (9)
- Leslie Fagan - flute (9)
- John Klinghammer - clarinet (9)
- Mike Mogis - pedal steel (11)
- Corina Figueroa Escamilla - voice (11, 12)
- Jason Boesel - drums (12)
- Omar Velasco - guitar (12)
- Corina Figureoa-Esamilla and Phillip Schaffart - additional backing vocals (3)
