= Better Oblivion Community Center =

American indie rock duo

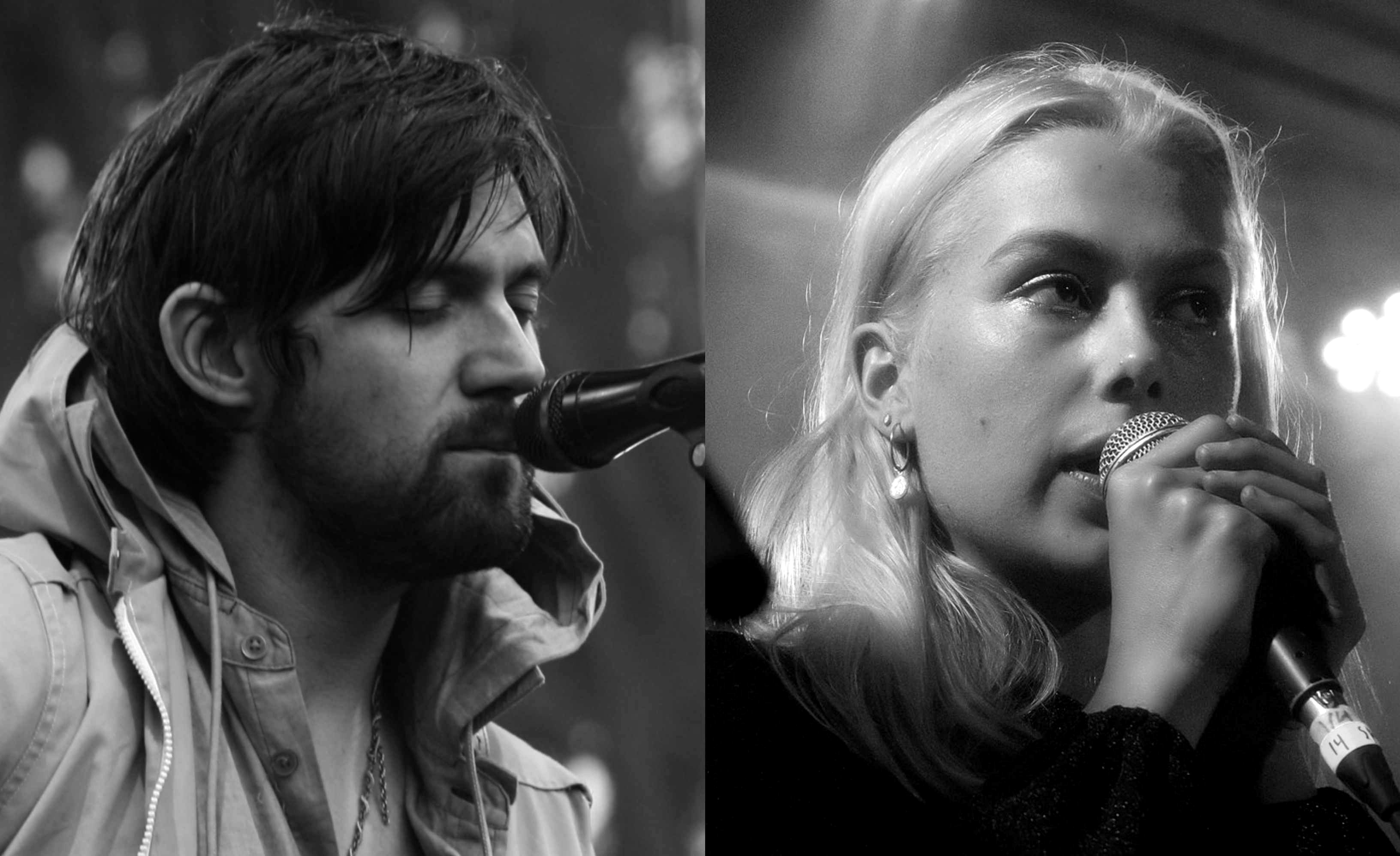
- Conor Oberst (left) and Phoebe Bridgers (right), the two members of Better Oblivion Community Center

Background information
- Origin: Los Angeles, California, U.S.
- Genres: Indie rock; indie folk
- Years active: 2018–2020
- Labels: Dead Oceans
- Past members: Conor Oberst; Phoebe Bridgers

Better Oblivion Community Center was an American indie rock superduo consisting of musicians Conor Oberst and Phoebe Bridgers. They released their self-titled debut album on January 24, 2019, through Dead Oceans.

== Background ==
Oberst and Bridgers first met in July 2016, when she performed at a secret showcase he was hosting at the Bootleg Theater in Los Angeles. A mutual friend of theirs was helping organize the event and told Oberst that he was Bridgers' favorite songwriter in LA at the time, so he invited her to play and was so impressed that he immediately asked her to send him the record she was working on. She then opened for him on his European Ruminations tour in January 2017, and they continued to collaborate consistently over the following two years. He brought her onstage to sing the Bright Eyes song "Lua" at WXPN's Xponential Music Festival that July, he sang on the duet "Would You Rather" from her debut Stranger in the Alps in September, they covered Sheryl Crow with Soccer Mommy at the Music Hall of Williamsburg in February 2018, and they worked together on a new version of his song "LAX" for Amazon Music in October, among numerous other joint appearances at each other's shows across the U.S.

The initial idea of forming the band apparently stemmed from Bridgers complimenting a cover Oberst had done of a Replacements song one night, and him replying that they should start a band and sound like the Replacements. When they first started writing together, they hadn't planned on putting out a record, and they thought they might be writing for one of each other's solo efforts or for a third party. Bridgers has said that it's common for Oberst to dream up "fake bands", so she didn't know that he was being serious until they had written "like, five songs". They mentioned that they wanted to create a separate project with its own name so that they could feel free to create a sound different than their individual solo acts.

== Career ==
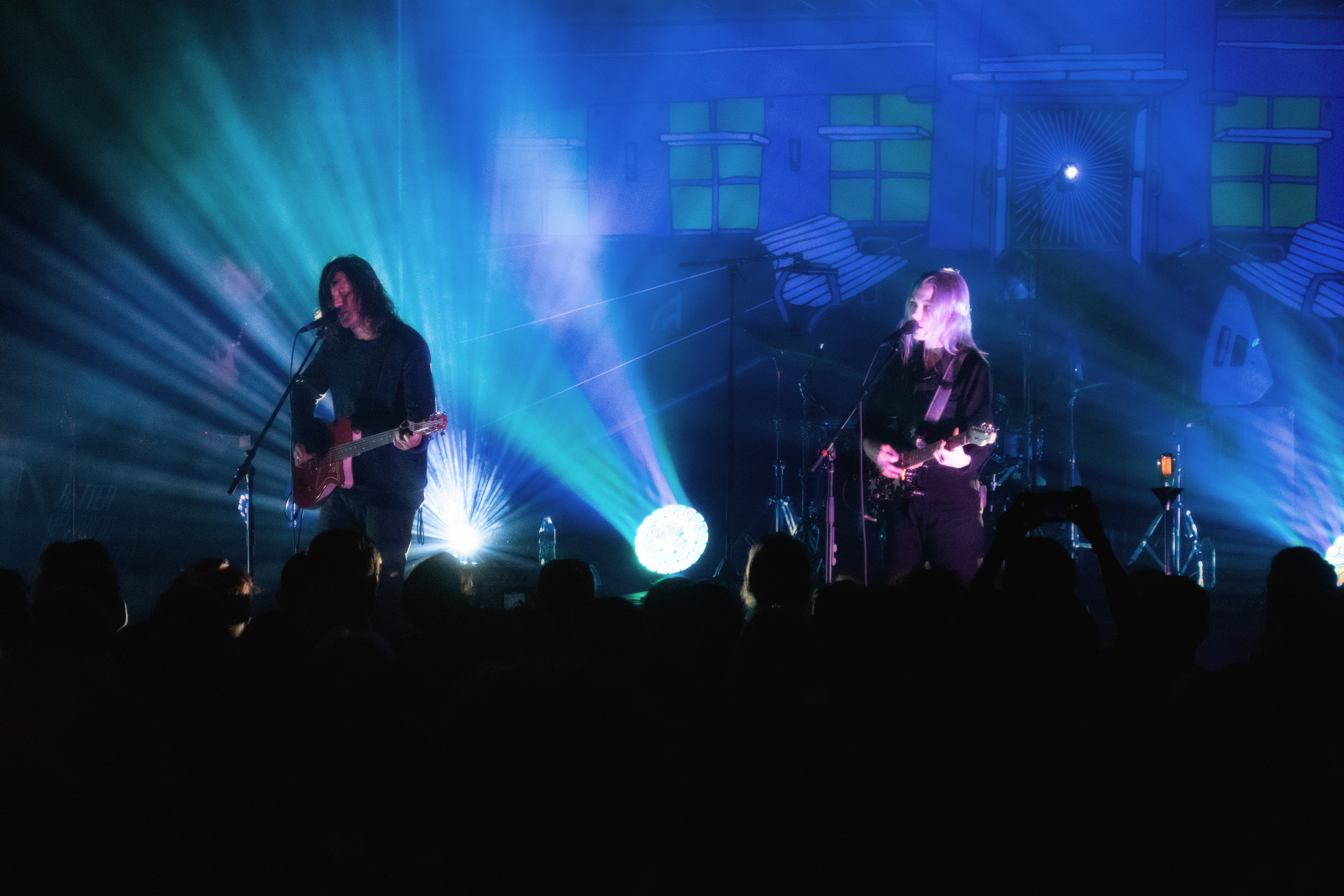
Better Oblivion Community Center at the Showbox Theater in Seattle in 2019

The duo released Better Oblivion Community Center on January 24, 2019, through Dead Oceans to generally positive reviews. The album was teased with "cryptic brochures" and a phone hotline, but was released with only a day of official notice and featured no promotional singles beforehand, which Bridgers explains was an effort to avoid people "[making] assumptions about what the entire record sounds like", since the songs are each so different.

They performed "Dylan Thomas" on The Late Show with Stephen Colbert the day before the album's release, and on January 26 appeared on CBS This Morning, where they performed "Dylan Thomas," "Didn't Know What I Was in For" and "My City." They also filmed a segment at the NPR Tiny Desk.

On January 29, 2019, the band announced their expansive concert tour of the U.S. and Europe, along with releasing a music video for their single, "Dylan Thomas," directed by Michelle Zauner.

Toward the end of their U.S. tour in April 2019, they released the single "Little Trouble," a song not featured on the album that had previously only been available as a 7-inch vinyl they had been selling at their shows. They also released a synth-pop version of their song "Sleepwalkin'" alongside it. The band played their final show to date on August 11, 2019, at The Independent in San Francisco, California.

Both Bridgers and Oberst resumed their careers independent of one another in 2020, with the former releasing her second album Punisher and the latter reuniting with Bright Eyes to release their tenth album Down in the Weeds, Where the World Once Was. The pair briefly reunited during Bridgers' virtual concert in October 2020 for the Save Our Stages initiative, wherein they duetted on Bridgers' "Halloween" and sang "Dylan Thomas" together. In August 2023, Bridgers performed a Better Oblivion song live for the first time since their 2019 tour when she sang "Chesapeake" with Christian Lee Hutson at a concert in connection with Øyafestivalen.

== Discography ==
=== Studio albums ===
Title	Album details	Peak chart positions									
Title	Album details	US Sales	US Alt.	US Folk	US Heat	US Indie	US Rock	BEL (FL)	NLD	UK	UK Indie
Better Oblivion Community Center	Released: January 23, 2019; Label: Dead Oceans; Format: LP, CD, digital download, streaming	23	18	7	2	4	41	20	117	76	4

=== Singles ===
Title	Year	Peak chart positions	Album
Title	Year	US AAA	Album
"Symposium Message"	2019	—	Non-album single
"Dylan Thomas"	2019	21	Better Oblivion Community Center
"Little Trouble"	2019	—	Non-album single

== Accolades ==
Year	Association	Category	Nominated work	Result	Ref
2019	AIM Awards	Best Independent Album	Better Oblivion Community Center	Nominated	
2020	Libera Awards	Marketing Genius	Better Oblivion Community Center	Nominated	
