= Conor Oberst =

American musician (born 1980)

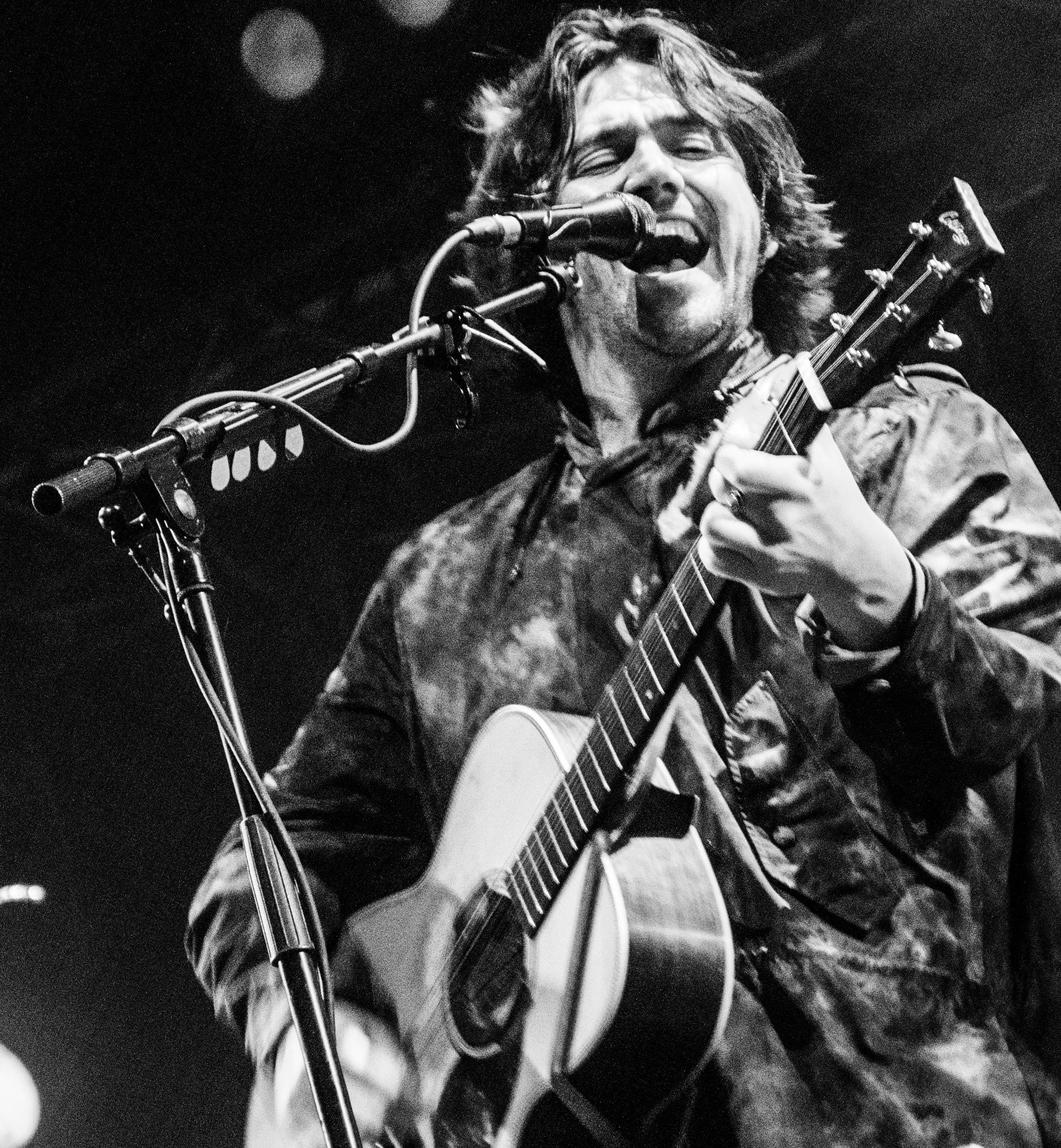
- Oberst at Haldern Pop Festival 2017

Background information
- Born: Conor Mullen Oberst; February 15, 1980 (age 46); Omaha, Nebraska, United States
- Genres: Indie rock; folk; alternative country; emo; indie folk; Americana
- Occupations: Singer-songwriter, musician, multi-instrumentalist
- Instruments: Vocals, guitar, bass, piano, keyboards, drums, harmonica, percussion
- Years active: 1993–present
- Labels: Saddle Creek; Wichita; Sing, Eunuchs!; Merge; Team Love; Nonesuch; Dead Oceans
- Member of: Bright Eyes
- Formerly of: The Faint; Commander Venus; Park Ave.; Monsters of Folk; Conor Oberst and the Mystic Valley Band; Desaparecidos; Better Oblivion Community Center
- Website: www.conoroberst.com

Conor Mullen Oberst (born February 15, 1980) is an American singer-songwriter best known for his work in Bright Eyes. He has also played in several other bands, including Desaparecidos, the Faint (previously named Norman Bailer), Commander Venus, Park Ave., Conor Oberst and the Mystic Valley Band, Monsters of Folk, and Better Oblivion Community Center. Oberst was named the Best Songwriter of 2008 by Rolling Stone magazine.

== Early life and education ==
Conor Mullen Oberst was born on February 15, 1980, the youngest of three boys, and raised in Omaha, Nebraska, to Matthew Ryan Oberst Sr., an information manager for Mutual of Omaha, and Nancy Oberst, an elementary education director for Omaha Public Schools. Oberst had two older brothers, Matthew Ryan Oberst Jr. and Justin H. Oberst. Matthew was a teacher and part-time musician until his death in 2016, and helped finance one of Oberst's self-released independent albums. Matt was also in the indie band Sorry About Dresden, which Conor played in from time to time. Conor has been writing and releasing music from a very young age, releasing his first solo album when he was 13.

Oberst was educated at St. Pius X/St. Leo School in Omaha, Nebraska, where he was in the school choir and other musical groups, and Creighton Preparatory School, also in Omaha, Nebraska. He briefly was enrolled at the University of Nebraska–Lincoln and dropped out after three semesters to tour.

== Career ==
=== Early career ===
One night in 1992, Ted Stevens (of Mayday and Cursive) invited Oberst onstage to play. Bill Hoover, who was in attendance, invited Oberst to come back to play with him a couple of weeks later. In that short amount of time, Oberst wrote enough songs to fill out the set, establishing himself as an artist. Shortly thereafter, Oberst began committing his new repertoire to tape in his parents' basement with his father's four track cassette recorder and an acoustic guitar.

In mid-1993, Oberst self-released his debut album, Water, on cassette tape. The release of the album was financed by his brother Justin on what they called Lumberjack Records, the indie label that would become Saddle Creek Records, making them founders and present day executives of the label.

Shortly after his two solo recordings, Oberst began playing with four friends; they formed Commander Venus in mid-1995.

Here's to Special Treatment was followed by 1996's The Soundtrack to My Movie, a cassette only released on Sing Eunuchs!. Kill the Monster Before It Eats Baby, a split 7-inch vinyl with Bill Hoover, was also released around this time.

=== The Faint (1994–1995) ===
In 1994, following a Slowdown Virginia show, Oberst, along with Joel Petersen and brothers Todd Fink and Clark Baechle, formed a band called Norman Bailer, later known as The Faint.

A few days later, Oberst told the other members of the band that they had a show in two weeks at Kilgore's. Despite having never performed together, they produced nine songs to perform. An album, Sine Sierra, was released (on cassette only) in 1995.

=== Commander Venus (1994–1998) ===
Oberst formed the rock band Commander Venus in 1994 with Tim Kasher, Ben Armstrong, and Robb Nansel. They recorded two albums: Do You Feel at Home? (1995) and The Uneventful Vacation (1997). Kasher later went on to form Cursive and Nansel was the co-founder of Saddle Creek Records. Kasher left the group to focus on Cursive as they were about to go into the studio to record their second album, and was replaced by Todd Baechle. Commander Venus disbanded in 1998.

=== The Magnetas (1996) ===
The Magnetas were only active for a very brief period of time in 1996 in Omaha. Along with Oberst, band members included Todd Fink (the Faint) and Chris Hughes (Beep Beep). They recorded three songs, only one of which ("Annex Anex") was released on Ghostmeat Records Parts compilation album. Two other confirmed recordings exist: "Clatter" and "Science Fiction in Schools".

=== Park Ave. (1996) ===
In January 1996, Oberst began playing drums in a group named Park Ave., alongside Clark Baechle, Jenn Bernard, Neely Jenkins (now in the band Tilly and the Wall), and Jamie Williams (also in Tilly and the Wall). The group only played between 10 and 15 shows and made a handful of recordings (several of them with Mike Mogis as producer). The group disbanded in 1998 when Williams, the singer and primary songwriter, moved to London, England. In 1999, Urinine Records released their only album, When Jamie Went to London ... We Broke Up, which has also now been re-released under Team Love.

=== Bright Eyes (1995–2011, 2020–present) ===
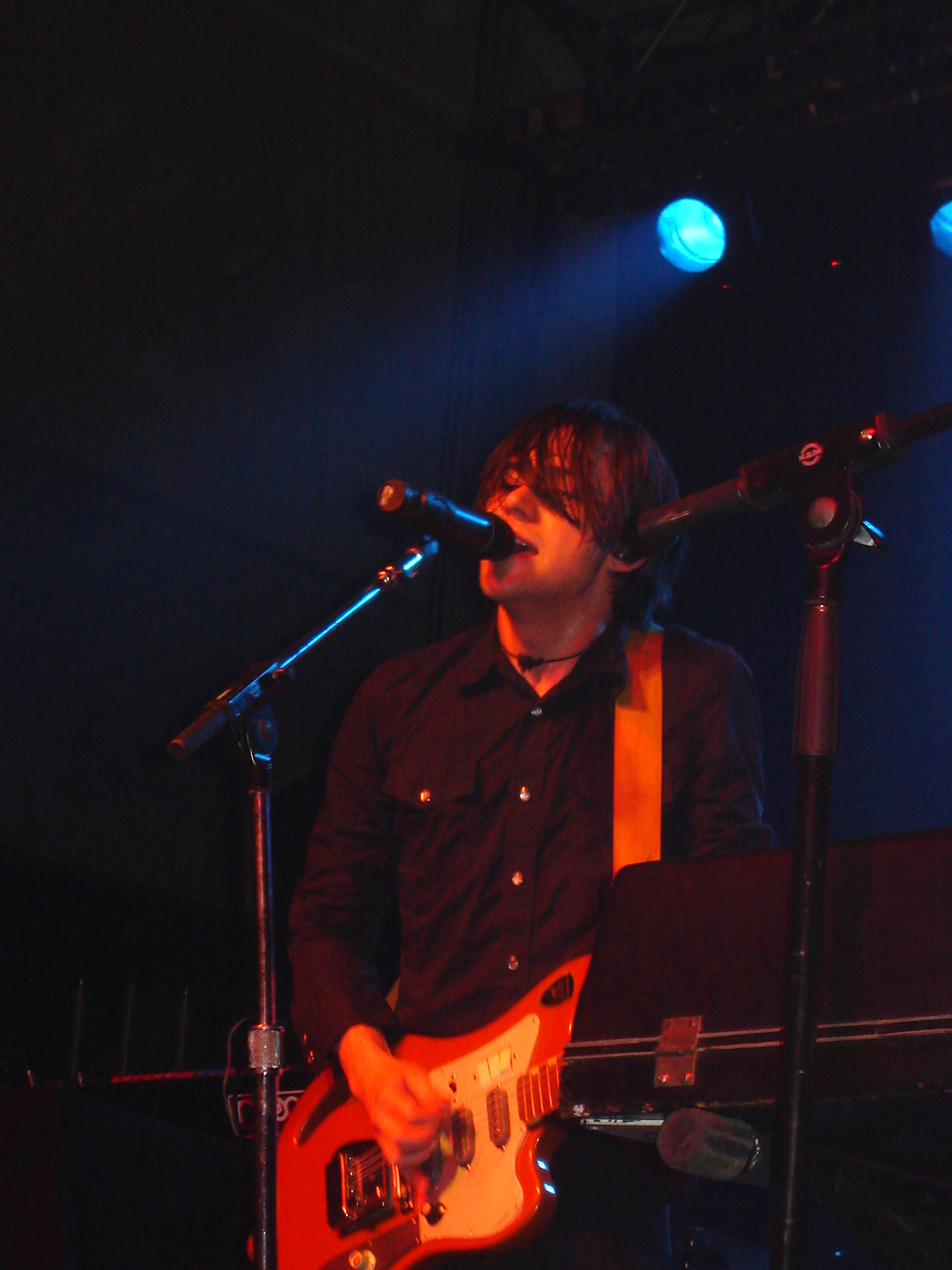
Conor Oberst performing in 2005 with Bright Eyes at Schlachthof, in Wiesbaden, Germany

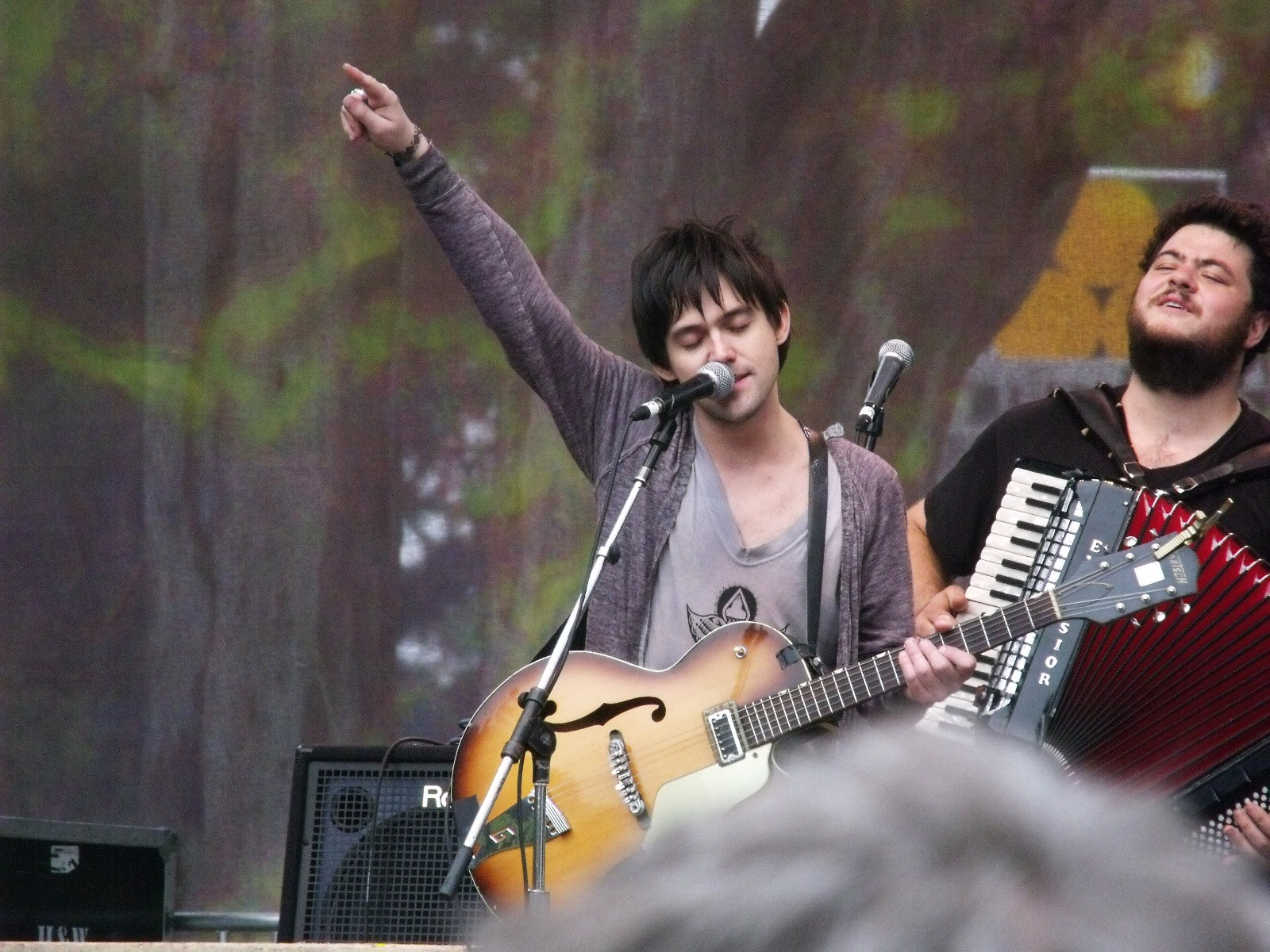
Oberst in 2010 performing at the Hardly Strictly Bluegrass music festival in San Francisco

Oberst founded Bright Eyes as a solo project in 1995, and after the disbanding of Commander Venus, released A Collection of Songs Written and Recorded 1995–1997 in January 1998. This was followed quickly by Letting Off the Happiness, released in November of the same year. It featured members of numerous bands and was recorded in the Oberst family basement. One year later, Bright Eyes released its first EP, Every Day and Every Night. Bright Eyes' third album, Fevers and Mirrors was released in May 2000; it was ranked 170 on Pitchfork's list of the top 200 albums of the 2000s.

With the release of 2002's Lifted or The Story Is in the Soil, Keep Your Ear to the Ground, Bright Eyes received national attention and Oberst was proclaimed a breakthrough artist by several notable magazines. On January 25, 2005, Bright Eyes simultaneously released two new albums: the folk I'm Wide Awake, It's Morning and more electronic-pop Digital Ash in a Digital Urn. Time listed I'm Wide Awake, It's Morning as one of the top ten albums of 2005.

The Four Winds EP was released in March 2007, followed by their seventh album, Cassadaga in April. The song "Four Winds" was named a top 100 song of 2007 by Rolling Stone. Oberst spent the next two years focusing on other music projects, and in June 2009 told Rolling Stone he wanted to make one final album with Bright Eyes before retiring the group. The band subsequently released The People's Key on Conor's 31st birthday, February 15, 2011.

In January 2020 the band announced their return to both touring and recording after a nine-year hiatus, and released their tenth album Down in the Weeds, Where the World Once Was on August 21, 2020.

In September of 2024, Bright Eyes released 'Five Dice, All Threes', as their 11th studio album via the record label Dead Oceans - of which they moved to in 2020 - before going on a worldwide tour of the album throughout late 2024 and 2025.

=== Desaparecidos (2001–2002, 2010, 2012–2015) ===
Oberst is a guitarist and singer for Desaparecidos. The music and lyrics of Desaparecidos differ greatly from Bright Eyes, having more in common with punk rock than Oberst's usual folk rock. The lyrics are generally social commentary on the state of affairs in America and the pitfalls of the suburban lifestyle, as opposed to the more introspective lyrics of Bright Eyes. Desaparecidos was active as a band between 2001–2002, they re-grouped for several one off shows in the Omaha area during the early 2010's before reuniting fully between 2012–2015. Their debut album, Read Music / Speak Spanish, was released on February 12, 2002. A second full-length album, Payola, was released on June 23, 2015.

=== Conor Oberst and the Mystic Valley Band (2007–2012) ===
In November 2007, it was reported that Oberst would work on a solo record with Jake Bellows, and that he and M. Ward would start a band and perform two late December shows in Minneapolis, Minnesota. Contrary to what was believed, the shows were not played with M. Ward, but rather with Nik Freitas and Jason Boesel. They also played a show in February in Mexico City, Mexico.

On March 31, 2008, it was announced that Conor Oberst would play at the 2008 Reading and Leeds Festivals. He also performed at the Electric Picnic, in County Laois, Ireland, on August 31, 2008, the Cains Ballroom in Tulsa, Oklahoma, and Austin City Limits in late September 2008, shows across Australia in early October 2008, and the Warfield Theater in San Francisco October 24. Oberst also headlined the Friday night slot of the End of the Road Festival at the Larmer Tree Gardens in Wiltshire, held over the weekend of September 12–14, 2008.

Conor Oberst released the self-titled album Conor Oberst, which was recorded in Tepoztlán, Morelos, Mexico, with Taylor Hollingsworth on guitar and Macey Taylor on bass, on August 5, 2008, on Merge Records.

In about mid-October, the band sold a new EP, Gentleman's Pact. It was limited to 1000 copies and was only available on tour. The band placed limitations on how many were sold at shows. It has four unreleased tracks. Three of them are pre-album songs while "Corina, Corina" is a cover of a traditional folk song.

Oberst and the band released their second album, Outer South, on May 5, 2009, on Merge Records. They have also released a documentary, One of My Kind, following the band from Conor's solo album to their most recent album, One of My Kind.

=== Monsters of Folk (2009) ===
Conor Oberst is one of the four members of the band Monsters of Folk. Other band members include Jim James of My Morning Jacket, M. Ward and fellow Bright Eyes member Mike Mogis. The band members swap instruments and share vocal duties. The quartet released their self-titled debut album on September 22, 2009.

=== Solo work (2008–present) ===
Oberst released his first solo album, Water, in the form of a cassette tape when he was just 13. However, this album is difficult to find and is no longer sold. His second solo album was 2008's self-titled Conor Oberst. Throughout the end of 2012 and the beginning of 2013, Oberst embarked on a solo tour of North America and Europe performing with Ben Brodin on guitar and vibraphone. On the tour, he played songs from Bright Eyes, Mystic Valley Band, and Monsters of Folk as well as playing new songs.

Oberst released a new solo record, titled Upside Down Mountain, on May 19, 2014. He has been working with producer Jonathan Wilson (Dawes, Father John Misty) and Swedish duo First Aid Kit.

On October 14, 2016, Oberst released his seventh studio solo record, titled Ruminations, on Nonesuch Records.

On January 18, 2017, Oberst announced a companion album to Ruminations, called Salutations.

=== Better Oblivion Community Center (2019) ===
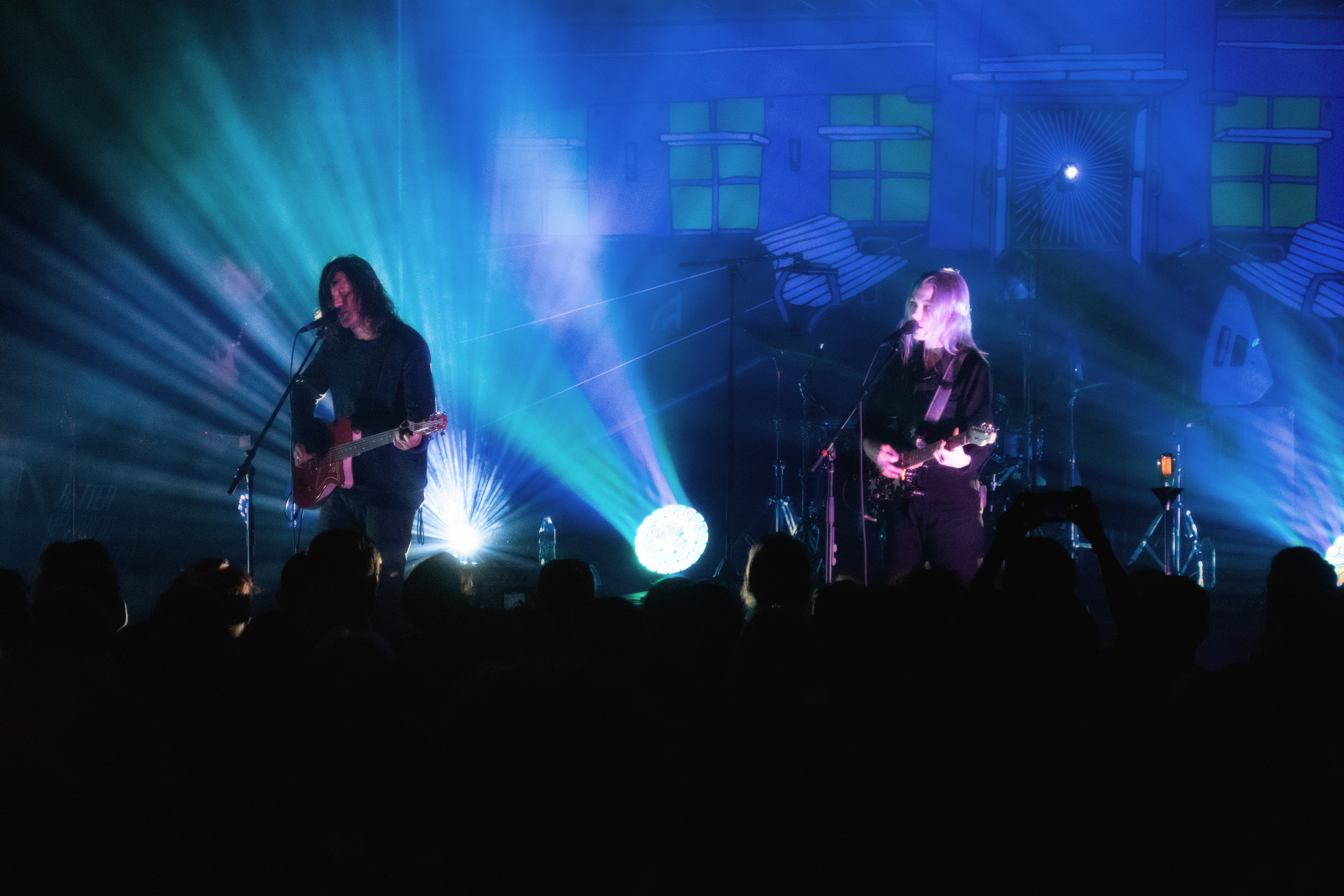
Oberst and Bridgers performing as Better Oblivion Community Center in 2019

Oberst and Phoebe Bridgers revealed their oft rumored new band, Better Oblivion Community Center, on the Late Show with Stephen Colbert on January 23, 2019, and released their eponymous debut album at midnight on January 24, 2019 (out via Dead Oceans). Band members include guitarist Nick Zinner from Yeah Yeah Yeahs and drummer Carla Azar from Autolux.

== Other projects ==
=== Saddle Creek records ===
Oberst is one of the founding members of the independent record label Saddle Creek Records, an integral part of Omaha's indie rock scene, which hosts bands such as Cursive, Desaparecidos, The Faint (which left to start its own label Blank.wav), Rilo Kiley (which left to start its own label Brute-Beaute Records), Bright Eyes, Two Gallants, Son, Ambulance, Azure Ray, The Good Life, Sorry About Dresden, and Big Thief among others.

=== Team Love records ===
Oberst co-founded the Team Love record label (along with Nate Krenkel, longtime manager of Bright Eyes) to "do different things, or smaller things, that we couldn't get everyone to be into at the same time" at Saddle Creek. such as Tilly and the Wall, Willy Mason, The Felice Brothers, David Dondero, Taylor Hollingsworth and Jenny Lewis' solo album with The Watson Twins.

=== Pageturners Lounge ===
Oberst opened Pageturners Lounge, a bar, with Philip Schaffart in 2012. Pageturners Lounge is located in the Dundee neighborhood in Omaha. The business name is a holdover from the bookstore that formerly occupied the space.

== Music style and influences ==
Oberst was drawn to music at a very early age, due in part to his brother Matt's penchant for bands like The Smiths, R.E.M., Fugazi, and The Cure. He has cited The Cure's first singles collection, Staring at the Sea, as the first record he ever bought, as well as being one of his favorites. "It must have been third grade ... I bought the cassette at a local record store chain called Homer's in Omaha. I just loved the sound of Robert Smith's voice. It just sounded good."

Some of his biggest influences and favorite songwriters are local musicians David Dondero and Simon Joyner. Joyner wrote the song "Burn Rubber", which Bright Eyes covered on the "Take It Easy (Love Nothing)" single. The two used to do mini-tours together, usually on weekends due to Joyner having a family.

Oberst has also been heavily influenced by the 1960s folk revival, mentioning Neil Young, Leonard Cohen, and country singers Emmylou Harris, John Prine and Townes Van Zandt. Harris sang on a few tracks on Bright Eyes' I'm Wide Awake, It's Morning. As a prolific and well-known musician in the folk genre, he has sometimes been defined as "a new Bob Dylan." He covered Neil Young's "Out on the Weekend", collaborating with Mike Mogis, Jim James and M. Ward in concert. He performed the Townes Van Zandt song "Rex's Blues" live with fellow musician Steve Earle. He has also performed two of John Prine's songs live, "Crazy as a Loon" and "Wedding Day in Funerville".

Oberst was greatly influenced by Daniel Johnston, whose "Devil Town" was covered and featured on Noise Floor, and profoundly influenced by Elliott Smith, stating in an October 22, 2003 All Things Considered interview that, "sometimes when you're not feeling good, you have to listen to really sad music like Elliott Smith's" and that [Smith] "wrote the sweetest, saddest, most gentle songs". Oberst also said he liked to "listen to Elliott Smith's songs when he [couldn't] find anyone to talk to on the phone" and thought that it was sad that "through his music, [Smith] had the ability to answer feelings in others that he was unable to answer in himself". A live cover of Smith's "The Biggest Lie" is featured on Motion Sickness. Oberst also has described the late singer-songwriter Vic Chestnutt as “one of the greatest ever,” and Bright Eyes released a cover of Chestnutt’s song “Flirted with You All My Life” in 2021.

== Personal life ==
In the 2000s, Oberst was in a relationship with singer-songwriter Maria Taylor for seven years.

In 2010, Oberst married Corina Figueroa Escamilla, whom he met in 2008 while recording music in Mexico. They separated amicably in 2017.

He lives in Omaha.

In December 2013, Oberst was accused of sexual assault by a female fan, leading to widespread media coverage. However, by July 2014, she had retracted the accusation, stating that the accusations were "100% false" and that "my actions were wrong and could undermine the claims of actual sexual assault victims, and for that I also apologize." Of the period in his life, Oberst said "I'm not violent towards anyone ... And for a second, to have the whole world think that [the allegations were] true about me just did a number on my psyche." He also went on to emphasize that he did not want to minimize how frequently women are sexually assaulted and said that "as painful and surreal and fucked up as my situation was, I don't ever want to use this as an example to justify anything."

Oberst's brother Matthew died suddenly on November 27, 2016, in Cary, North Carolina, where he was a schoolteacher. He was 42.

=== Health ===
On October 28, 2015, in the midst of Desaparecidos' tour for their second studio album, Payola, it was announced that Oberst had been hospitalized due to "laryngitis, anxiety, and exhaustion", according to a press release. The entirety of Desaparecidos' remaining tour dates were canceled and Oberst returned to his hometown of Omaha to recuperate.

In September 2024, Oberst lost his voice after Bright Eyes completed three warm-up shows in preparation for their tour in support of Five Dice, All Threes. The band canceled its next three shows "to prioritise rest and recuperation for the remainder of the month". On September 27, Bright Eyes canceled all of their 2024 tour dates following medical tests which determined Oberst "developed a condition that is exacerbated by excessive singing, requiring both treatment and recuperation". The band's second show, in Cleveland, sparked concern from fans after Oberst appeared to be heavily intoxicated and, while slurring his words, expressed frustration with his strained voice and subsequently joked about killing himself. On October 23, Oberst posted a video message in which he thanked fans for their messages of support and reported "feeling a lot better". Bright Eyes resumed their tour in January 2025.

== Discography ==
- Conor Oberst (2008)
- Outer South (2009)
- Upside Down Mountain (2014)
- Ruminations (2016)
- Salutations (2017)
