= Saturation (Vas Deferens Organization album) =

Studio album by Vas Deferens Organization
- Released: 1996
- Recorded: 1996 at VDO Studios, Dallas, Texas
- Genre: Experimental rock
- Length: 45:30
- Label: Aether
- Producer: Matt Castille, Eric Lumbleau

Vas Deferens Organization chronology
Transcontinental Conspiracy (1996)	Saturation (1996)	Zyzzybalubah (1997)

Saturation is the debut album of Vas Deferens Organization, released in 1996 through Aether Records.

== Track listing ==
All music is composed by Matt Castille and Eric Lumbleau.

Side one
No.	Title	Length
1.	"On the Threshold of Some Great Discovery"	3:37
2.	"Lazy Eyed Locusts in Defocused Landscapes"	7:19
3.	"Purple Aerosol"	5:53
4.	"Amön Döö & Pöpöl Pöö"	9:01

Side two
No.	Title	Length
1.	"Rickshaw Grande-Prix"	5:45
2.	"Transmissions From the Pineal Bandwidth"	5:02
3.	"Beacon From a Nostalgic Future Past"	4:17
4.	"Headlong Plunge"	4:35

== Personnel ==
Adapted from the Saturation liner notes.

Vas Deferens Organization

- Matt Castille – instruments, production, engineering
- Eric Lumbleau – instruments, production, cover art

Production and additional personnel

- Jim Edgerton – guitar, sitar
- Jim Goodall – drums on "Rickshaw Grande-Prix"
- Brad Laner – bass guitar and drums on "Rickshaw Grande-Prix"

== Release history ==
Region	Date	Label	Format	Catalog
United States	1996	Aether	LP	aelp-001
