= Grandes Études de Paganini =

Six piano études by Franz Liszt from themes of Paganini

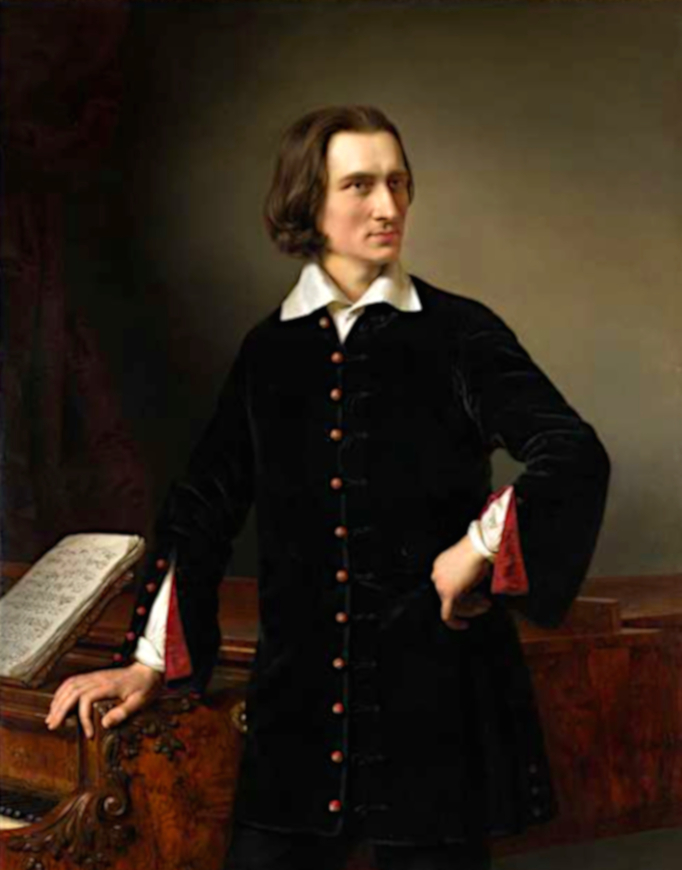
Franz Liszt, portrait by Hungarian painter Miklós Barabás, 1847

The Grandes études de Paganini, S. 141, are a series of six études for the piano by Franz Liszt, revised in 1851 from an earlier version (published as Études d'exécution transcendante d'après Paganini, S. 140, in 1838). It is almost exclusively in the final version that these pieces are played today.

The pieces are all based on some of the Caprices (Nos. 6/5, 17, 1, 9, and 24) and concertos (No. 2/1) by Niccolò Paganini for violin, and are among the most technically demanding pieces in pianistics (especially the original versions, before Liszt revised them, thinning the textures and removing some of the more outrageous technical difficulties). The pieces run the gamut of technical hurdles, and frequently require very large stretches by the performer of an eleventh (although all stretches greater than a tenth were removed from the revised versions).

== Études ==
=== Étude ===
- Original version (1838), S. 140 – Dedicated to Madame Clara Schumann
  - Étude No. 1 in G minor "Tremolo", marked Andante Non troppo – lento cantabile, which is after Paganini's Caprice No. 6 in G minor (with the introduction and coda of No. 5). Begins with a prelude of rapid arpeggios and scales and then enters the main étude section, as the name suggests, the piece is meant to employ tremolos. Voicing and dynamics are important in tremolos, and adding to its difficulty is the fact that many tremolos are marked to be played by the left hand only.
  - Étude No. 2 in E♭ major, marked Andantino capricciosamente, which is after Caprice No. 17 in E♭ major. Contains many rapid scales and octaves and requires elegance and quality of tone.
  - Étude No. 3 in A♭ minor, La Campanella marked Allegro moderato, which is after the final movement of Paganini's Violin Concerto No. 2 in B minor, and containing the first theme of the final movement of Paganini's Violin Concerto No. 1 in E♭ major.
  - Étude No. 4 in E major, marked Andante quasi allegretto, which is after Caprice No. 1 in E major. It contains 2 versions, the second of which is widely considered to be one of Liszt's most difficult works, containing rapid octaves, chords, and large intervals and jumps.
  - Étude No. 5 in E major "La Chasse", marked Allegretto – dolcissimo, which is after Caprice No. 9 in E major.
  - Étude No. 6 in A minor, marked Quasi presto a capriccio, which is after Caprice No. 24 in A minor, with a slightly altered theme and 11 variations. The technically demanding work abounds with rapid octaves, scales, arpeggios, and high pitched themes.

=== Grandes études de Paganini ===
Six Paganini Etudes by Liszt
Played by MIDI

- Revised version (1851), S. 141 – dedicated to Madame Clara Schumann
  - Étude No. 1 in G minor "Tremolo", marked Andante – Non troppo lento, which is after Caprice No. 6 in G minor (with the introduction and coda of No. 5).
  - Étude No. 2 in E♭ major, marked Andante capriccioso, which is after Caprice No. 17 in E♭ major.
  - Étude No. 3 in G♯ minor "La Campanella", marked Allegretto, which is after the final movement of Paganini's Violin Concerto No. 2 in B minor.
  - Étude No. 4 in E major "Arpeggio", marked Andante quasi allegretto, which is after Caprice No. 1 in E major. It had been written on one line only, omitting the usual separate line for the left hand; this was fixed in the new version. Furthermore, its lowest tone is the G_{3}, the score thus mimicking a score for violin.
  - Étude No. 5 in E major "La Chasse", marked Allegretto, which is after Caprice No. 9 in E major.
  - Étude No. 6 in A minor, marked Quasi presto a capriccio, which is after Caprice No. 24 in A minor.

== See also ==
- List of variations on a theme by another composer
