= Danse Macabre Remixes =

Remix album by The Faint
- Released: April 1, 2003
- Genre: New wave, dance-punk
- Length: 57:50
- Label: Astralwerks
- Producer: Mike Mogis, The Faint

The Faint chronology
Danse Macabre (2001)	Danse Macabre Remixes (2003)	Wet from Birth (2004)

Professional ratings
Review scores
Source	Rating
AllMusic	2.5/5 stars
Muzik	4/5 stars
Rolling Stone	4/5 stars

Danse Macabre Remixes is the second remix album (following the limited pressing of the Blank-Wave Arcade Remix LP) by the indie rock band The Faint, with remixes from their 2001 album Danse Macabre. It was released on April 1, 2003. There is also a special triple vinyl edition featuring a bonus remix of the track Violent by local Omaha, Nebraska artist, Adam Willis.

== Track listing ==
All tracks by The Faint

1. "The Conductor" (Thin White Duke Mix by Stuart Price) – 7:52
2. "Posed to Death" (remixed by The Calculators) – 4:49
3. "Glass Danse" (remixed by Paul Oakenfold) – 5:39
4. "Let the Poison Spill from Your Throat" (Let The Clock Punch Redux by Tommie Sunshine) – 5:09
5. "The Total Job" (remixed by Photek) – 5:16
6. "Agenda Suicide" (remixed by Jagz Kooner) – 5:05
7. "Your Retro Career Melted" (remixed by Ursula 1000) – 5:14
8. "Posed to Death" (remixed by Mojolators) – 6:46
9. "Violent" (remixed by Junior Sanchez) – 7:18
10. "Ballad of a Paralysed Citizen" (remixed by Medicine) – 4:42
11. "Violent" (remixed by Adam Willis) – 7:18 *Vinyl only

== Personnel ==
- The Calculators – Producer, Remixing
- The Faint – Compilation, Track Engineer
- Ian Green – Programming, Engineer
- Errol Kolosine – Compilation
- Jagz Kooner – Producer, Remixing
- Brad Laner – Producer, Remixing
- Emily Lazar – Mastering
- Jacques Lu Cont – Producer, Remixing
- Mike Mogis – Track Engineer
- Justin Nichols – Producer, Remixing
- Paul Oakenfold – Remixing
- Photek – Producer, Remixing
- Sarah Register – Assistant
- Junior Sanchez – Producer, Remixing
- Tommie Sunshine – Producer
- Ursula 1000 – Producer, Remixing
- Mark Verbos – Engineer
