= Blank-Wave Arcade =

Studio album by The Faint
- Released: November 2, 1999
- Genres: New wave, indie rock
- Length: 24:58
- Label: Saddle Creek

The Faint chronology
Media (1998)	Blank-Wave Arcade (1999)	Blank-Wave Arcade Remixes (2000)

Blank-Wave Arcade is the second studio album by the American new wave band The Faint, released on November 2, 1999, by Saddle Creek Records. The album earned positive critical attention, including an 8.1 out of 10 review from Pitchfork. A twenty-fifth anniversary deluxe edition arrived on March 14, 2025, pairing a remastered sequence with remixes, live recordings, and archival material.

== Reception ==
Professional ratings
Review scores
Source	Rating
AllMusic	4/5 stars
Pitchfork Media	(8.1/10)

Ondarock critic Andrea Vascellari wrote, "Most of Blank-Wave Arcade is a tribute to synth-pop: listening to songs like 'Worked Up So Sexual' (the band's first radio hit) and 'Cars Pass in Cold Blood', it's impossible not to think of Ultravox's Midge Ure or OMD." Drawing additional comparisons to the likes of Gary Numan and Devo, Heather Phares of AllMusic stated, "Though originality isn't their strong suit, the Faint do display an aggressive, dynamic reinterpretation of their influences, suggesting that their synthetic new wave can be just as entertaining as the real deal."

== Track listing ==
=== Original release ===
No.	Title	Length
1.	"Sex Is Personal"	3:37
2.	"Call Call"	2:26
3.	"Worked Up So Sexual"	2:40
4.	"Cars Pass in Cold Blood"	2:40
5.	"Casual Sex"	3:15
6.	"Victim Convenience"	2:55
7.	"Sealed Human"	3:06
8.	"In Concert"	2:19
9.	"The Passives"	2:41

=== Deluxe edition ===
The twenty-fifth anniversary deluxe edition was released on March 14, 2025. It collects remixes, live recordings, and a previously out-of-print single along with a new remix by the band.

No.	Title	Length
1.	"Sex Is Personal"	3:38
2.	"Call Call"	2:26
3.	"Worked Up So Sexual"	2:40
4.	"Cars Pass in Cold Blood"	2:40
5.	"Casual Sex"	3:15
6.	"Victim Convenience"	2:56
7.	"Sealed Human"	3:12
8.	"In Concert"	2:19
9.	"The Passives"	2:41
10.	"Cars Pass in Cold Blood (Recordist Remix)"	3:04
11.	"Worked Up So Sexual (The Laces Remix)"	2:54
12.	"The Passives (AJ/DJ Remix)"	3:43
13.	"In Concert (The New Gender Remix)"	3:08
14.	"Call Call (Transistor3 Remix)"	6:19
15.	"Sealed Human (]['m Remix)"	3:04
16.	"Sex Is Personal (The Faint 2024 Remix)"	4:02
17.	"Brokers, Priests, and Analysts"	3:09
18.	"Cars Pass in Cold Blood (Live)"	2:35
19.	"In Concert (The New Gender Remix [Live])"	3:07
20.	"Call Call (Live)"	2:32

== Personnel ==
- Todd Fink – vocals, synthesizer
- Jacob Thiele – synthesizer, vocals
- Joel Petersen – bass, guitar
- Clark Baechle – drums, vocals
- A.J. Mogis – engineer
- Jamie Williams – photography, cover photograph
