= Lingus (disambiguation) =

Lingus may refer to:

- Lingus, album by the American rock band Amnesia
- “Lingus”, song from the album We Like It Here by the American jazz fusion group Snarky Puppy
- Culinaire Lingus, album by the French progressive rock band Ange
- Aer Lingus, flag carrier airline of Ireland
