= Vas Deferens Organization =

Music band in the United States of America

- Origin: Dallas, Texas, U.S.
- Genres: Experimental rock; art rock; noise rock; psychedelic rock; progressive rock; jazz rock; musique concrete; minimalism; ethnic music
- Years active: 1994–present
- Labels: Womb Tunes, Quaquaversal Vinyl, Aether Records, Tekito, Eerie Materials, Niklas Records, Beta-lactam Ring Records
- Members: Matt Castille; Eric Lumbleau; Christopher Moock
- Past members: Jason Cohen; Barbara Cohen; Craig Carlton; Breck Outland; Reagen Boone; Brian Artwick; Doug Ferguson; Jay Jernigan
- Website: vasdeferensorganization.com

Vas Deferens Organization is an American experimental band and a production team founded in Dallas in 1994 by Matt Castille in association with Christopher Moock, Jason Cohen, Barbara Cohen, Craig Carlton, Breck Outland, and Reagen Boone. In 1995 Eric Lumbleau joined the group. From 1995 through 2007, VDO was a loose collective centered on Castille and Lumbleau and ever-changing collaborators. Christopher Moock reunited with Castille and Lumbleau in 2007.

They have worked, amongst many others, with Brad Laner of Medicine fame, Mercury Rev, and Ariel Pink with whom they are friends. Pink is also a long-term fan of Mutant Sounds, a blog devoted to esoteric music from various eras and corners of the world, run by Eric Lumbleau and Matt Castille.

Their musical output is extremely diverse, ranging from minimalism, musique concrete, audio montage, raga and ethnic music to krautrock.

Some of their most notable productions include Cruising in the Neon Glories of the New American Night (1996) by Mazinga Phaser (produced by Castille), and Ariel Pink With Added Pizzazz (produced as Vas Deferens Organization). One of the tracks from the latter album appeared in an alternative cut on Ariel Pink's Haunted Graffiti 2010 record Before Today.

Among their collaborations, the most noteworthy ones would be Transcontinental Conspiracy recorded with Brad Laner with the addition of Jason Russo, Suzanne Thorpe, and Sean "Grasshopper" Mackowiak from Mercury Rev. It was self-released in 1996 on Quaquaversal Vinyl and re-issued in 2011 on Niklas Records with a previously unreleased track, Scheming Foils, that also featured Laner.

Eric Lumbleau, Matt Castille and Christopher Moock have also released their own solo recordings, under monikers of Sound, Muz and Christopher Moock respectively.

== Critical reception ==
While not achieved any sort of commercial success, the band has achieved a critical success.

== Selected discography ==
=== Studio albums ===
- 1996: Saturation (Aether Records)
- 1997: Zyzzybalubah (2XLP) (Aether)
- 1997: Sweat Your Cheeses, But Not in My Salad (Charnel Music)
- 1998: Queas and Art (Eerie Materials)
- 1998: The Idiot Parade (Eerie Materials)
- 1999: Drug Bubbles (Free Dope And Fucking In The Streets)
- 2010: Ninth Ward Fourth World (Free Dope And Fucking In The Streets)
- 2011: Eye Peels & Brain Picks (Puer Gravy)

=== Collaborations ===
- 1996: Miasmata w/ Christopher Moock
- 1996: Transcontinental Conspiracy credited as Vas Deferens Organization and Brad Laner, w/ Jason Russo, Suzanne Thorpe and Grasshoper of Mercury Rev (Quaquaversal Vinyl - 2011, Niklas Records)
- 1999: More Pelvis Wick for the Baloney Boners w/ Electric Company (Tekito)
- 2001: Suspension w/ Christopher Moock
- 2008: Trick or Treat credited as Shits and Giggles, w/ Ariel Pink (Free Dope And Fucking In The Streets)

=== Produced by ===
- 1996: Mazinga Phaser, Cruising in the Neon Glories of the New American Night (Aether)
- 2010: Ariel Pink with Added Pizzazz (Free Dope And Fucking In The Streets)
