= Zyzzybalubah =

Studio album by Vas Deferens Organization
- Released: 1997
- Recorded: 1997 at VDO Studios, Dallas, Texas
- Genre: Experimental rock
- Length: 52:36
- Label: Aether
- Producer: Matt Castille, Eric Lumbleau

Vas Deferens Organization chronology
Saturation (1996)	Zyzzybalubah (1997)	Sweat Your Cheeses, But Not in My Salad (1997)

Zyzzybalubah is the second studio album by the rock band Vas Deferens Organization. It was released in 1997 through Aether Records.

== Track listing ==
All music is composed by Matt Castille, Doug Ferguson and Eric Lumbleau.

Side one
No.	Title	Length
1.	"Pongcraft"	9:02

Side two
No.	Title	Length
1.	"Effortless Pilgrimage Against Ashes"	8:42
2.	"It Was Just Moments Prior to Descent"	4:25

Side three
No.	Title	Length
1.	"Futura Perspective"	14:24

Side four
No.	Title	Length
1.	"Zyzzybaloubah" (I. Marigold Jello/II. A Drowsy Orange/III. Ache)	16:04

== Personnel ==
Adapted from the Zyzzybalubah liner notes.

Vas Deferens Organization

- Matt Castille – instruments, production, engineering
- Doug Ferguson – instruments
- Eric Lumbleau – instruments, production, cover art

Production and additional personnel

- Jim Edgerton – guitar, sitar and keyboards on "Marigold Jello"
- Doug Ferguson – bass guitar on "Futura Perspective" and "A Drowsy Orange"
- Jay Jernigan – keyboards on "Effortless Pilgrimage Against Ashes", "It Was Just Moments Prior to Descent" and "Futura Perspective"
- Sage Tilleman – vocals on "Marigold Jello"
- Michelle Tilleman – vocals on "A Drowsy Orange"

== Release history ==
Region	Date	Label	Format	Catalog
United States	1997	Aether	LP	aelp-004/005
