= The Crow: Original Motion Picture Soundtrack =

Soundtrack album by various artists
- Released: March 29, 1994
- Genres: Alternative rock; alternative metal; industrial rock; gothic rock; groove metal
- Length: 63:50
- Labels: Interscope; Atlantic
- Producer: Various

Singles from The Crow: Original Motion Picture Soundtrack
- 1. "Big Empty" Released: April 1994

Professional ratings
Review scores
Source	Rating
AllMusic	4.5/5 stars

The soundtrack to the superhero film The Crow was released in 1994.

== Album information ==
The album featured covers, including Nine Inch Nails who covered Joy Division's "Dead Souls", Pantera who covered Poison Idea's "The Badge", and Rollins Band who covered Suicide's "Ghost Rider", which is about a Marvel Comics character. Rage Against the Machine re-recorded their 1993 B-side "Darkness of Greed" and renamed it "Darkness" for this soundtrack. My Life with the Thrill Kill Kult re-recorded their original song "Nervous Xians" and re-titled it "After the Flesh" for this film. They were also the band onstage during the nightclub shootout scene. The Cure also wrote the song "Burn" for the movie. Stone Temple Pilots originally intended to re-record a song off their Mighty Joe Young demo, titled "Only Dying", but instead chose to submit the track "Big Empty" to the project when Brandon Lee was accidentally killed on-set during production. Medicine re-recorded their song "Time Baby II" for the film's soundtrack album as "Time Baby III", which featured guest vocals by Elizabeth Fraser of Cocteau Twins, although the original version is performed by Medicine in the film. "It Can't Rain All the Time" was co-written by Jane Siberry and the film's composer Graeme Revell, performed by Siberry. An orchestral version of "It Can't Rain All the Time" can be heard in the film multiple times.

The inclusion of songs written by the Cure and Joy Division are notable because the influences of both bands are present in the original comic book. James O'Barr, the creator of The Crow, reprinted the lyrics to the song "The Hanging Garden" by the Cure on an entire page, and some chapters of the comic book are named after Joy Division songs – "Atmosphere" and "Atrocity Exhibition", for example. In one panel, Eric even quotes a lyric from the song "Disorder" from the album Unknown Pleasures. O'Barr was a big fan of both bands when he was creating the comic book.

The other music in the film which is not included in the soundtrack is instead on The Crow: Original Motion Picture Score of original, mostly orchestral music, with some electronic and guitar elements, written for the film by Graeme Revell.

Peaking at the top of the Billboard Top 200 Albums Chart, the album has sold 3.8 million copies in the United States, and has been certified 3× Platinum by RIAA.

== Track listing ==
No.	Title	Writer(s)	Producer(s)	Length
1.	"Burn" (The Cure)	Robert Smith; Simon Gallup; Boris Williams; Perry Bamonte	Robert Smith; Bryan "Chuck" New	6:39
2.	"Golgotha Tenement Blues" (Machines of Loving Grace)	Scott Benzel; Mike Fisher; Stuart Kupers; Tom Melchionda	Machines of Loving Grace	3:58
3.	"Big Empty" (Stone Temple Pilots)	Dean DeLeo; Scott Weiland	Brendan O'Brien	4:55
4.	"Dead Souls" (Nine Inch Nails)	Ian Curtis; Peter Hook; Bernard Sumner; Stephen Morris	Trent Reznor	4:52
5.	"Darkness" (Rage Against the Machine)	Rage Against the Machine; Zack de la Rocha (lyrics)	Rage Against the Machine	3:41
6.	"Color Me Once" (Violent Femmes)	Gordon Gano; Brian Ritchie	Violent Femmes	4:10
7.	"Ghostrider" (Rollins Band)	Martin Rev; Alan Vega	Theo Van Rock	5:44
8.	"Milktoast" (Helmet)	Page Nye Hamilton	Butch Vig; Helmet	3:59
9.	"The Badge" (Pantera)	Tom Roberts; Jerry Lang	Pantera	3:53
10.	"Slip Slide Melting" (For Love Not Lisa)	For Love Not Lisa	Matt Hyde; Doug Carrion (co.)	5:45
11.	"After the Flesh" (My Life with the Thrill Kill Kult)	Buzz McCoy; Groovie Mann	Buzz McCoy	2:58
12.	"Snakedriver" (The Jesus and Mary Chain)	William Reid; Jim Reid	William Reid; Jim Reid	3:39
13.	"Time Baby III" (Medicine)	Jim Goodall; Brad Laner; Jim Putnam; Ed Ruscha; Beth Thompson	Brad Laner	3:50
14.	"It Can't Rain All the Time" (Jane Siberry)	Graeme Revell; Jane Siberry	Graeme Revell	5:34
Total length:				63:37

== Charts ==
=== Weekly charts ===
Chart (1994)	Peak position
Australian Albums (ARIA)	2
Austrian Albums (Ö3 Austria)	6
German Albums (Offizielle Top 100)	6
Hungarian Albums (MAHASZ)	11
New Zealand Albums (RMNZ)	15
Swiss Albums (Schweizer Hitparade)	11
US Billboard 200	1

Chart (2019)	Peak position
Croatian International Albums (HDU)	1

=== Year-end charts ===
Chart (1994)	Position
Australian Albums (ARIA)	55
German Albums (Offizielle Top 100)	68
US Billboard 200	46

== Certifications ==
Region	Certification	Certified units/sales
Australia (ARIA)	Gold	35,000^{^}
Canada (Music Canada)	Platinum	100,000^{^}
United Kingdom (BPI)	Gold	100,000^{^}
United States (RIAA)	3× Platinum	3,000,000^{^}
^{^} Shipments figures based on certification alone.
