= Studio City (album) =

Studio album by Electric Company
- Released: March 10, 1998
- Recorded: Lab of Happy Dreams; North Hollywood Police Tactical Zone
- Genre: IDM
- Length: 55:13
- Label: Supreme/Island/PolyGram Records; 524 482
- Producer: Brad Laner

Brad Laner chronology
| Cherry Flavor Night Time (1997) | Studio City (1998) | The Story of Personal Electronics (1998) |

Professional ratings
Review scores
| Source | Rating |
|---|---|
| Allmusic | 4.5/5 stars |
| Pitchfork Media | (5.6/10) |

Studio City is the second album by Electric Company, released on March 10, 1998, on Island Records.

== Track listing ==
All tracks are written by Brad Laner, except "Darken An' Slobbering", "Greenland" and "Born Algebra Skinned" co-written with Kenneth James Gibson.

| No. | Title | Length |
|---|---|---|
| 1. | "Arbor Sirens" | 1:26 |
| 2. | "Star Klang" | 4:40 |
| 3. | "Darken An' Slobbering" | 4:59 |
| 4. | "Greenland" | 4:01 |
| 5. | "Throb Ear" | 5:12 |
| 6. | "Second Serve" | 4:26 |
| 7. | "Appendix" | 9:14 |
| 8. | "Born Algebra Skinned" | 8:56 |
| 9. | "Yard Disturb" | 2:28 |
| 10. | "Soundcard" | 9:51 |

== Personnel ==
- Kenneth James Gibson – keyboards on "Darken An' Slobbering", "Greenland" and "Born Algebra Skinned"
- Peter Grant – illustrations, design
- Brad Laner – instruments, production, engineering, mixing, recording
- Brian Rosser – guitar on "Arbor Sirens"
