= The Mechanical Forces of Love =

Studio album by Medicine
- Released: July 15, 2003
- Genre: Dream pop; indie electronic; psychedelic
- Length: 47:17
- Label: Wall of Sound; Astralwerks
- Producer: Brad Laner

Medicine chronology
Her Highness (1995)	The Mechanical Forces of Love (2003)	To the Happy Few (2013)

The Mechanical Forces of Love is the fourth album by American rock band Medicine, released on July 15, 2003 by Wall of Sound.

This album marked the band's return, after eight years of hiatus, in the form of a duo of Brad Laner and Shannon Lee.

== Background ==
The album was Medicine's first record in eight years, and their first album since the group's split. The album also marks the group's re-introduction of a female vocalist: singer and actress Shannon Lee, daughter of karate actor Bruce Lee. The Mechanical Forces of Love is Lee's first appearance with the group; previously, vocals were provided by Beth Thompson.

== Style ==
The album's genre has been classified as dream pop, indie electronic, and shoegaze. Laner described the album's style as "Glitchy Beach Boys harmonies." The album was perceived by some as a departure from the group's previous shoegazing sound, but others felt that the album was a "synergy" of Medicine's earlier style with that of Laner's side-project, Electric Company. An album review by Uncut described the album's style as a "collision of Beach Boys/West Coast harmonies with beats’n’glitches electronica and mangled sci-fi noise." The album's themes are love and sex.

Opening track "As You Do" was described as "shambolic electro-funk" by Maya Singer (writing for CMJ New Music Monthly), while Pitchfork deemed the song "psychedelic short-circuit funk" and likened its style to Sly Stone. Tim Sendra, writing for AllMusic, described Lee's vocals on the song as "almost funky." Many of the album's songs were (uncharacteristically for the band) guitar-less, with "Good for Me" and "Whiz" being singled out as two of the only songs to feature the instrument prominently. Pitchfork posited that the album, despite its techno influence, should be considered "a psychedelic record at heart."

AllMusic compared the album's overall style to Garbage. Both AllMusic and Uncut likened the vocal harmonies to those of the Beach Boys.

== Release ==
The album was released on July 15, 2003. Some editions were released on the record label Wall of Sound, while others were released by Astralwerks.

The single "I Smile to My Eyes" was included on the compilation accompanying the August 2003 issue of CMJ New Music Monthly. To promote the album, it was given to non-commercial modern rock radio stations, with the focus tracks singled out as "I Smile to My Eyes," "As You Do," "Astral Gravy," and "Wet on Wet."

== Critical reception ==
Professional ratings
Review scores
Source	Rating
AllMusic	2/5 stars
Guardian	4/5 stars
Pitchfork	(8.0/10)
Uncut	4/5 stars

Upon its release, the album received positive reviews from critics, holding a score of 70/100 on review aggregate site Album of the Year. In a review for Pitchfork, critic Nitsuh Abebe commended the album's "gorgeous movements," singling out "As You Do" as a "wow-inducing rush" and concluding that "For some it might burn off quickly, but for just as many it'll sit just fine."

== Track listing ==
All tracks are written by Brad Laner and Shannon Lee, except where noted. Adapted from album liner notes.

No.	Title	Writer(s)	Length
1.	"As You Do"		3:40
2.	"I Smile to My Eyes"		4:20
3.	"Wet on Wet"		3:50
4.	"Best Future"	Brad Laner	4:14
5.	"ioi"		4:35
6.	"I M Yrs"		4:35
7.	"Astral Gravy"		2:56
8.	"Good for Me"		3:56
9.	"Negative Capability"	Brad Laner	3:39
10.	"Whiz"		3:36
11.	"Sodden Rockets"	Kid606, Brad Laner	3:42
12.	"And Sometimes Y"		4:32

== Personnel ==
Medicine

- Brad Laner – vocals, instruments, production, engineering, mixing
- Shannon Lee – vocals

Production and additional personnel

- Jonathan de Villiers – photography
- Matt Devine – additional vocals
- Kid606 – drum machine
- Josh Laner – drums
- Joey Waronker – drums
