= Greatest Hits (Electric Company album) =

Remix album by Electric Company
- Released: December 11, 2001
- Recorded: Lab of Happy Dreams, Encino, CA
- Genre: IDM
- Length: 73:45
- Label: Tigerbeat6
- Producer: Brad Laner

Brad Laner chronology
62-56 (2001)	Greatest Hits (2001)	It's Hard to Be a Baby (2003)

Professional ratings
Review scores
Source	Rating
Allmusic	4/5 stars
Alternative Press	4.5/5 stars

Greatest Hits is a remix album by the electronic band Electric Company. It was released in 2001 on Tigerbeat6.

== Track listing ==
All tracks are written by Brad Laner.

No.	Title	Length
1.	"Josie and the Slamming Demonic Riffs" (remixed by Kid606)	9:17
2.	"Around" (remixed by Timeblind)	5:00
3.	"170" (remixed by Geoff White)	6:50
4.	"Thursa2 Hostile Takeover" (remixed by Leafcutter John)	4:56
5.	"Octelcogopod" (remixed by μ-Ziq)	4:55
6.	"Elco-Men-Oh" (remixed by Blectum from Blechdom)	2:57
7.	"Elco 2" (remixed by Jasper)	5:23
8.	"The Blingus Cufflinks" (remixed by Lexaunculpt)	5:23
9.	"Knotenansammlung" (remixed by Pimmon)	5:38
10.	"Hey, You Guys" (remixed by Phthalocyanine)	3:53
11.	"Kelvinator" (remixed by Tom Recchion)	4:05
12.	"Siamang's Sibling"	3:14
13.	"Polynomial Space" (remixed by Kim Cascone)	5:16
14.	"Wednes3" (remixed by Frank Bretschneider)	6:58

== Personnel ==
- Brad Laner – instruments, production
- Steve Miller – photography
