= Caprice No. 5 (Paganini) =

Classical violin piece by Paganini

The saxophonist David Hernando performing Caprice No.5, by Niccolò Paganini.

Caprice No. 5 is one of 24 caprices for solo violin composed by virtuoso violinist Niccolò Paganini in the early 19th century. The piece is known for its fast tempo and technical difficulty. Paganini is said to have been able to play it on one string, but there is no evidence to support or refute this.

== Transcription for other instruments ==
The piece has been transcribed for several instruments, including saxophone, piano, cello, bassoon, accordion, and guitar.

The piece is also associated with the movie Crossroads as "Eugene's Trick Bag," which was written and performed by Steve Vai and heavily inspired by the caprice.

The first recorded true transcription of the piece appeared on Eliot Fisk's landmark recording that transcribed the entire 24 Caprices for the classical guitar.

== Influence on contemporary music ==
Though written for the violin, the piece has also become known amongst guitarists, particularly because of its appeal to the technical proficiency of the shred guitar genre. This can be seen from virtuoso Jason Becker's version of the piece, re-arranged for electric guitar (see External Links) and for Yngwie Malmsteen's use of Paganini inspired techniques in his music. Yngwie Malmsteen created a guitar tab transcription for the piece (which deviated from the original score) in an issue of Guitar World magazine. The following are examples of the piece in modern music:

- The piece inspired rapper Busdriver for the intermission part of his song "Imaginary Places".
- The title track of Michael Angelo Batio's No Boundaries contains an arrangement of the piece.
- Finnish neo-classical metal band Virtuocity used a variation in the song "Eye for an Eye" on their debut album Secret Visions.
- German heavy metal band Domain uses a variation in the solo for their song "Warpath" on the album The Sixth Dimension.
- Joe Stump uses elements of the piece in the track "Paganini's Revenge" from the album Guitar Dominance.
- The first notes of the composition are used in The Faint's album Wet from Birth at the beginning of the first track, "Desperate Guys".

== References in contemporary art ==
Cory Arcangel produced a mashup video, or Caprice No. 5 supercut, for his 2011 Solo show at the Whitney Museum of American Art.
