= Blank-Wave Arcade Remixes =

Remix album by The Faint
- Released: May 29, 2000
- Genres: Indie rock, new wave, post-punk revival
- Length: 34:31
- Labels: Saddle Creek (LBJ-33); Blood of the Young (young-015)

The Faint chronology
Blank-Wave Arcade (1999)	Blank-Wave Arcade Remixes (2000)	Danse Macabre (2001)

Professional ratings
Review scores
Source	Rating
AllMusic	2.5/5 stars

Blank-Wave Arcade Remixes is a limited 12-inch picture-disc remix album by American band The Faint, issued on May 29, 2000, by Saddle Creek as catalog number LBJ-33 and co-released by Blood of the Young (young-015). The record compiles nine remixes of songs from the group's 1999 album Blank-Wave Arcade. It received a mediocre listing on AllMusic, and several of its era remixes were later included on the 2025 Blank-Wave Arcade (Deluxe Edition) reissue program from Saddle Creek.

== Background and release ==
Saddle Creek released LBJ-33 as a vinyl picture-disc Blank-wave Arcade Remix Album issued between the band's Blank-Wave Arcade (LBJ-28) and Danse Macabre (LBJ-37). The vinyl was released in the U.S. on May 29, 2000 with a total play time of 34:31. The release was limited with only 1,100 copies pressed with eight test pressings. Saddle Creek acknowledges the twelve-inch as "long out of print."

Remix credits include The New Gender, AJ/DJ, The Totally Kill Me, Transistor 3, The Laces, ][m, Recordist, Soft Curve, and S. Krolikowski. Saddle Creek's 2024–2025 reissue campaign issued several of these mixes under explicit remixer attributions, including "Call Call (Transistor3 Remix)" and "Worked Up So Sexual (The Laces Remix)."

== Track listing ==
No.	Title	Remixer	Length
1.	"In Concert" (Hot Bulb Mix)	The New Gender	3:11
2.	"The Passives" (Cardboard Square Mix)	AJ/DJ	3:45
3.	"Sex Is Personal" (ZGA Go Go Mix)	The Totally Kill Me*	2:12
4.	"Call Call" (Club Mix)	Transitor3	7:45
5.	"Worked Up So Sexual" (Pole Mix)	The Laces	2:56
6.	"Sealed Human" (The Remix Kills Mix)	]['m	3:06
7.	"Cars Pass In Cold Blood" (Trans Mix)	Recordist	3:08
8.	"Casual Sex" (Heavenly Attraction Mix)	Soft Curve	3:43
9.	"Victim Convenience" (Dance To)	S. Krolikowski	4:47
Total length:			31:25

=== Personnel and credits ===
- The Faint – performance, original recordings
- Remixes – The New Gender; AJ/DJ; The Totally Kill Me; Transistor 3; The Laces; m; Recordist; Soft Curve; S. Krolikowski

== Critical reception ==
AllMusic lists the release and assigns a 2.5/5 rating.
