= Doom Abuse =

Studio album by The Faint
- Released: April 8, 2014
- Genre: Indie rock, new wave, dance-punk
- Length: 35:02
- Label: SQE Music
- Producer: The Faint

The Faint chronology
Fasciinatiion (2008)	Doom Abuse (2014)	Egowerk (2019)

Professional ratings
Aggregate scores
Source	Rating
Metacritic	71/100
Review scores
Source	Rating
AllMusic	3.5/5 stars

Doom Abuse is the sixth studio album by the Nebraska dance-punk band The Faint. SQE Music released the record in the United States on April 8, 2014. The album blends new wave, dance-punk, and indie rock elements and earned a Metacritic score of 71 from professional reviews. To mark the tenth anniversary, the Faint issued a deluxe edition on April 8, 2024 that adds tracks from the previously unavailable "Evil Voices" 12-inch single.

== Track listing ==
=== Original release ===
The original 2014 release runs 35 minutes.

Original edition
No.	Title	Length
1.	"Help in the Head"	4:22
2.	"Mental Radio"	2:46
3.	"Evil Voices"	3:41
4.	"Salt My Doom"	2:18
5.	"Animal Needs"	3:50
6.	"Loss of Head"	2:58
7.	"Dress Code"	1:47
8.	"Scapegoat"	2:00
9.	"Your Stranger"	2:47
10.	"Lesson from the Darkness"	3:52
11.	"Unseen Hand"	4:15
12.	"Damage Control"	4:28
Total length:		35:02

=== Deluxe edition ===
The deluxe edition combines the original sequence with bonus recordings sourced from the "Evil Voices" 12-inch single and related sessions.

Deluxe edition
No.	Title	Length
1.	"Help in the Head"	4:22
2.	"Mental Radio"	2:46
3.	"Evil Voices"	3:41
4.	"Salt My Doom"	2:18
5.	"Animal Needs"	3:50
6.	"Loss of Head"	2:58
7.	"Dress Code"	1:47
8.	"Scapegoat"	2:00
9.	"Your Stranger"	2:47
10.	"Lesson from the Darkness"	3:52
11.	"Unseen Hand"	4:15
12.	"Damage Control"	4:28
13.	"Evil Voices (Original 12" Version)"	3:43
14.	"This is is IS IS Pain"	4:13
15.	"Unseen Hand (Pre-Version)"	5:23
16.	"Circuit Jerk"	2:37
17.	"Skylab1979"	3:46
18.	"ESP"	4:41
Total length:		63:27

== Personnel ==
- Todd Fink
- Jacob Thiele
- Dapose (Michael Dappen)
- Clark Baechle
