= Cherry Flavor Night Time =

Studio album by Amnesia
- Released: March 11, 1997
- Genre: Shoegaze
- Length: 46:58
- Label: Supreme
- Producer: Brad Laner

Brad Laner chronology
Transcontinental Conspiracy (1996)	Cherry Flavor Night Time (1997)	Studio City (1998)

Professional ratings
Review scores
Source	Rating
Allmusic	4/5 stars
Allmusic (bonus disc)	4.5/5 stars
Pitchfork Media	(7.7/10)

Cherry Flavor Night Time is the debut album of Amnesia, released on March 11, 1997 through Supreme Recordings. A limited edition bonus disc contained a remix of the entire album by Brad Laner under his moniker Electric Company.

== Track listing ==
All tracks are written by Brad Laner, except "Drained" co-written by Matt Devine and Josh Laner and "Cherry Flavor Night Time" co-written by Matt Devine.

No.	Title	Length
1.	"Internal"	4:29
2.	"Drained"	3:00
3.	"Stay Awake"	4:20
4.	"If You Come Around"	3:59
5.	"Wrong With Me"	5:55
6.	"Blind Me"	4:11
7.	"Undergarden Song"	3:35
8.	"Slice"	6:07
9.	"Homing"	3:46
10.	"Mind Is Slow"	3:47
11.	"Cherry Flavor Night Time"	3:49

Bonus remix disc
No.	Title	Length
1.	"Suzurro"	3:56
2.	"The Changing of the Spores"	3:20
3.	"Stay Away"	4:18
4.	"Albumen"	4:08
5.	"Mente Floja"	3:37
6.	"Top Ten of the Cortex"	4:32
7.	"The Unlikely Faucet"	3:44
8.	"Rhythm Oil"	6:17
9.	"External"	5:29
10.	"Mal Conmigo"	5:15
11.	"The Blue Globes"	4:00

== Personnel ==
- Matt Devine – guitar on "If You Come Around" and "Cherry Flavor Night Time"
- Brad Laner – instruments, production, engineering, mixing
- Josh Laner – drums on "Undergarden Song"
- Eddy Schreyer – mastering
