= Natural Selections =

Studio album by Brad Laner
- Released: August 24, 2010
- Genre: Neo-Psychedelia
- Length: 39:43
- Label: Hometapes
- Producer: Thom Monahan

Brad Laner chronology
Neighbor Singing (2007)	Natural Selections (2010)

Professional ratings
Review scores
Source	Rating
Allmusic	3.5/5 stars
Pitchfork Media	(7.3/10)
PopMatters	(7/10)

Natural Selections is the second album by Brad Laner, released on August 24, 2010 through Hometapes.

== Track listing ==
All tracks are written by Brad Laner.

No.	Title	Length
1.	"Eyes Close"	3:38
2.	"Throat"	4:38
3.	"Lancaster"	4:28
4.	"Crawl Back In"	3:50
5.	"Magnolia Doubles"	3:36
6.	"Brain"	3:24
7.	"Why Did I Do It"	3:45
8.	"Dirty Bugs"	3:51
9.	"Vicky"	1:12
10.	"Runner"	3:43
11.	"Little Death"	3:53

== Personnel ==
Musicians

- Brad Laner – vocals, instruments, engineering, photography
- Julian Laner – electric guitar, vocals
- Chris Pitman – additional vocals
- Jordan Zadoronzy – acoustic guitar, bass guitar, piano, drums, percussion

Production and additional personnel

- Thom Monahan – mixing
