= Media (album) =

Studio album by The Faint
- Released: March 24, 1998
- Studios: Whoopass Recording, Lincoln, Nebraska
- Genre: Post-hardcore
- Length: 34:45
- Label: Saddle Creek
- Producer: A.J. Mogis

The Faint chronology
Sine Sierra (1995)	Media (1998)	Blank-Wave Arcade (1999)

Professional ratings
Review scores
Source	Rating
AllMusic	3/5 stars

Media is the second studio album by new wave revivalists The Faint and their first under that name; they had released their debut as Norman Bailer. It was released on March 24, 1998. A clear style change can be heard after this album's release, moving from a more post-hardcore influenced style to new wave.

== Track listing ==
1. "Syntax Lies" – 3:39
2. "Some Incriminating Photographs" – 3:09
3. "As the Doctor Talks" – 3:16
4. "Tandem: City to City" – 2:13
5. "Repertoire of Uncommon Depth" – 3:42
6. "Typing: 1974-2048" – 2:00
7. "Lullaby for the..." – 0:54
8. "Acting; On Campus Television" – 2:34
9. "<===> (Getting/Giving The Lock)" – 2:49 (Shown with two arrow icons on the CD track list)
10. "Amorous in Bauhaus Fashion" – 3:01
11. "There's Something Not as Valid When the Scenery Is a Postcard" – 2:33
12. "An Allusion Passes Through the Bar" – 6:57
13. "Defy the Ailments" (hidden track) – 2:05

== Personnel ==
- Todd Baechle – lead vocals, guitar
- Joel Petersen – guitar
- Matt Bowen – bass, backing vocals
- Clark Baechle – drums
