= 62-56 =

EP by Electric Company
- Released: July 24, 2001
- Recorded: Lab of Happy Dreams, Encino, CA
- Genre: IDM
- Length: 45:38
- Label: Tigerbeat6
- Producer: Brad Laner

Brad Laner chronology
Slow Food (2001)	62-56 (2001)	Greatest Hits (2001)

Professional ratings
Review scores
Source	Rating
Alternative Press	4/5 stars
Pitchfork Media	(5.8/10)

62-56 is an EP by the electronic band Electric Company. It was released in 2001 through Tigerbeat6.

== Track listing ==
All tracks are written by Brad Laner.

No.	Title	Length
1.	"Sun Stroke"	1:28
2.	"Hyperion"	4:54
3.	"Local Doppler"	0:36
4.	"Siamang"	3:50
5.	"Test Card"	4:01
6.	"Simi Valley Radar"	3:53
7.	"New Hearing A"	1:00
8.	"Something Akin to Living"	2:12
9.	"New Hearing B"	0:52
10.	"Kidblesserfromblectricompany"	15:49
11.	"Eye Induction"	7:03

== Personnel ==
- Brad Laner – instruments, production
