= La campanella =

Étude by Franz Liszt

"La Campanella"
Performed by Romuald Greiss on an 1850 Budynowicz piano

"La campanella" (Italian for "The little bell") is the subtitle given to the third of Franz Liszt's six Grandes études de Paganini, S. 141 (1851). It is in the key of G♯ minor.

== Background ==
"La campanella" is a revision of an earlier version from 1838, the Études d'exécution transcendante d'après Paganini, S. 140. Its melody comes from the final movement of Niccolò Paganini's Violin Concerto No. 2 in B minor, where the tune was reinforced by a "little handbell". This is illustrated by the large intervals of sixteenth notes in the right hand.

== Music ==
Incipit for "La campanella" by Franz Liszt (Grandes études de Paganini S. 141 no. 3)

The étude is played at a gentle, brisk allegretto tempo and features constant octave hand jumps between intervals larger than one octave, sometimes even stretching for two whole octaves within the time of a sixteenth note. As a whole, the étude can be practiced to increase dexterity and accuracy at large jumps on the piano, along with agility of the weaker fingers of the hand and muscles within the forearm and wrist.

The largest intervals reached by the right hand are fifteenths (two octaves) and sixteenths (two octaves and a second). Sixteenth notes are played between the two notes, and the same note is played two octaves or two octaves and a second higher with little to (depending on the arrangement) no rest.

Little time is provided for the pianist to move the hand, thus forcing the pianist to avoid tension within the muscles. Fifteenth intervals are quite common in the beginning of the étude, while the sixteenth intervals appear twice, at the first thirtieth and thirty-second measures.

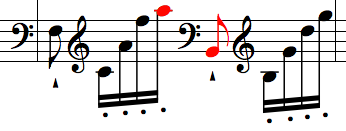
The two red notes are 35 half-steps apart (~46cm (~1.5 ft) apart on a piano.)

The left hand studies about four extremely large intervals, however, larger than those in the right hand. For example, in bar 101, the left hand makes a sixteenth-note jump of just a half-step below three octaves. The étude also involves other technical difficulties, including trills with the fourth and fifth fingers starting on measure 80 and lasting for 4 bars, and fast chromatic scales starting on measure 73.

== Arrangements ==
The work of Franz Liszt has been arranged by other composers and pianists, most notably Ferruccio Busoni and Marc-André Hamelin.
