= Slow Food (album) =

Studio album by Electric Company
- Released: April 9, 2001
- Recorded: June 2000–October 2000 at Lab of Happy Dreams, Encino, CA
- Genre: IDM
- Length: 50:33
- Label: Planet Mu
- Producer: Brad Laner

Brad Laner chronology
Exitos (2000)	Slow Food (2001)	62-56 (2001)

Professional ratings
Review scores
Source	Rating
Allmusic	3/5 stars
Stylus	(D)

Slow Food is the fifth album by Electric Company, released on April 9, 2001, on Planet Mu Records.

== Track listing ==
All tracks are written by Brad Laner.

No.	Title	Length
1.	"A"	1:00
2.	"Un Polvo"	3:17
3.	"Yresbo"	3:18
4.	"Men's Pocky"	3:14
5.	"New Imbalance"	2:54
6.	"Mainly Seconds"	3:18
7.	"Watch Yrself"	3:19
8.	"Postwils"	2:37
9.	"New Type of Funny"	1:53
10.	"Culillo"	3:10
11.	"Oiyaho"	3:41
12.	"Forty-Sixed"	3:21
13.	"I'm in a Mazda"	2:57
14.	"As Am I"	7:54
15.	"Que Pena"	4:32

== Personnel ==
- Brad Laner – instruments, production
