= Neighbor Singing =

Studio album by Brad Laner
- Released: November 6, 2007
- Recorded: 2003–2006 at Eichler Sound in Balboa Highlands, CA
- Genre: Neo-Psychedelia
- Length: 39:43
- Label: Hometapes
- Producer: Thom Monahan

Brad Laner chronology
Creative Playthings (2004)	Neighbor Singing (2007)	Natural Selections (2010)

Professional ratings
Review scores
Source	Rating
Allmusic	4/5 stars
The A.V. Club	(B−)
Pitchfork Media	(7.4/10)

Neighbor Singing is the debut solo album of composer Brad Laner, released on November 6, 2007 through Hometapes. Although the Electric Company and Amnesia albums were primarily composed and performed by Laner, Neighbor Singing is the first album to be issued under his own name.

== Track listing ==
All tracks are written by Brad Laner, except "Arlie" co-written with Alex Graham.

No.	Title	Length
1.	"Find Out"	3:06
2.	"Out Cold"	3:56
3.	"Lovely World"	3:52
4.	"Vecino"	3:26
5.	"Arlie"	2:25
6.	"Alambres"	3:31
7.	"June Gloom"	4:10
8.	"April Bossa"	0:59
9.	"Sure"	4:07
10.	"Falling Time"	1:46
11.	"From Inside"	3:36
12.	"Circumscribe"	4:49

== Personnel ==
Musicians

- Brad Laner – vocals, instruments, engineering
- Julian Laner – synthesizer on "Lovely World"
- Aracelis Yera – backing vocals on "Out Cold"

Production and additional personnel

- J.J. Golden – mastering
- Josh Keyes – painting
- Thom Monahan – production, mixing
