= Wet from Birth =

Studio album by The Faint
- Released: September 14, 2004
- Recorded: Presto! Recording Studios, The Orifice
- Length: 34:24
- Label: Saddle Creek
- Producer: Mike Mogis, The Faint

The Faint chronology
Danse Macabre Remixes (2003)	Wet from Birth (2004)	Fasciinatiion (2008)

Professional ratings
Aggregate scores
Source	Rating
Metacritic	72/100
Review scores
Source	Rating
AllMusic	3/5 stars
Pitchfork Media	5.5/10
Playlouder	2.5/5 stars
PopMatters	(favorable)
Stylus Magazine	B−

Wet from Birth is the fourth studio album by the American band The Faint, released on September 14, 2004 by Saddle Creek Records. The United States release uses HDCD encoding, but the package is not labeled as HDCD. It received generally favorable reviews, earning a Metacritic score of 72 out of 100. A twentieth anniversary deluxe edition with additional demos and remixes was released on March 14, 2025.

== Track listing ==
=== Original release ===
No.	Title	Length
1.	"Desperate Guys"	3:06
2.	"How Could I Forget?"	3:17
3.	"I Disappear"	4:07
4.	"Southern Belles in London Sing"	3:31
5.	"Erection"	2:45
6.	"Paranoiattack"	4:16
7.	"Dropkick the Punks"	2:28
8.	"Phone Call"	4:03
9.	"Symptom Finger"	3:27
10.	"Birth"	3:17

=== Deluxe edition ===
The twentieth anniversary deluxe reissue was released on March 14, 2025 and collects the remastered album along with archive recordings and remixes.

No.	Title	Length
1.	"Desperate Guys"	3:06
2.	"How Could I Forget?"	3:17
3.	"I Disappear"	4:11
4.	"Southern Belles in London Sing"	3:27
5.	"Erection"	2:45
6.	"Paranoiattack"	4:16
7.	"Dropkick the Punks"	2:28
8.	"Phone Call"	4:03
9.	"Symptom Finger"	3:28
10.	"Birth"	3:12
11.	"Zealots (Unrealized)"	3:21
12.	"Mister (Unrealized)"	2:42
13.	"Birth (Thailand Demo)"	3:06
14.	"Desperate Guys (Demo)"	3:01
15.	"Symptom Finger (Demo)"	4:12
16.	"Paranoiattack (Demo)"	4:15
17.	"Hypnotised"	2:49
18.	"I Disappear (FC Kahuna Remix)"	6:04

== In popular culture ==
- The instrumental bridge from "How Could I Forget?" is used during a chase scene in the pilot episode of the short-lived NBC drama, The Black Donnellys.
- The song "I Disappear" is featured in the video games SSX On Tour and Tony Hawk's American Wasteland.
- The song "Birth" is featured in the part of Steve Berra, in the skateboarding video Skate More, by DVS.
- The violin solo at the beginning of "Desperate Guys" is the introduction to Niccolò Paganini's Caprice No. 5.
- Desperate Guys was also featured in the 2012 Rock & Republic commercial.
- The song "Dropkick the Punks" appears in EA's 2007 racing game Need for Speed: ProStreet.
- The song "Symptom Finger" appears in Billabong's 'Still Filthy' film.
