= Exitos (Electric Company album) =

Studio album by Electric Company
- Released: September 11, 2000
- Recorded: February 1999–May 2000 at Lab of Happy Dreams, Encino, CA
- Genre: IDM
- Length: 63:27
- Label: Tigerbeat6
- Producer: Brad Laner

Brad Laner chronology
Omakase (1999)	Exitos (2000)	Slow Food (2001)

Professional ratings
Review scores
Source	Rating
Allmusic	3/5 stars

Exitos is the fourth studio album by the electronic band Electric Company. It was released in 2000 on Tigerbeat6.

== Track listing ==
All tracks are written by Brad Laner.

No.	Title	Length
1.	"Wednes3"	2:51
2.	"Around"	4:35
3.	"Entered"	2:45
4.	"Archive5"	4:03
5.	"Heart"	4:08
6.	"Through"	3:09
7.	"Octelcogopod"	4:33
8.	"Thursa2"	3:06
9.	"Mentioned"	3:01
10.	"Oufui"	4:57
11.	"()"	12:25
12.	"Knotted"	4:40
13.	"Known"	2:25
14.	"170"	6:49

== Personnel ==
- Brad Laner – instruments, production
