= Omakase (Electric Company album) =

Studio album by Electric Company
- Released: April 13, 1999
- Recorded: Lab of Happy Dreams, Encino, CA
- Genre: IDM
- Length: 73:48
- Label: Vinyl Communications
- Producer: Brad Laner

Brad Laner chronology
More Pelvis Wick for the Baloney Boners (1999)	Omakase (1999)	Exitos (2000)

Professional ratings
Review scores
Source	Rating
Allmusic	4.5/5 stars
Alternative Press	4/5 stars

Omakase is the third studio album by the dance band Electric Company. It was released in 1999 on Vinyl Communications.

== Track listing ==
All tracks are written by Brad Laner.

No.	Title	Length
1.	"+++"	1:18
2.	"A Cereal Syria"	3:06
3.	"A Lab Errand"	4:02
4.	"Andy Linear"	3:00
5.	"Randy Alien"	2:30
6.	"Blare"	4:16
7.	"Pha"	4:03
8.	"++"	3:55
9.	"A Half Tiger"	3:52
10.	"Bald Perhaps Foamy"	2:16
11.	"+"	1:46
12.	"Minidisco"	2:44
13.	"Ear Chute"	3:11
14.	"The Surgical Past"	24:59
15.	"[untitled]"	1:07
16.	"[untitled]"	0:32
17.	"[untitled]"	1:49
18.	"[untitled]"	1:22
19.	"[untitled]"	1:07
20.	"[untitled]"	0:48
21.	"[untitled]"	2:03

== Personnel ==
- Brad Laner – instruments, production
