= Stan Denski =

American writer, scholar, critic

- Born: Stanislaw Dzieniszewski; August 26, 1953 (age 73); Philadelphia, Pennsylvania, U.S.
- Education: Father Judge High School; Clarion University of Pennsylvania (BS, MS); Ohio University (PhD)
- Occupations: Writer; scholar; critic
- Spouse: Cheryl Denski (m. 1980)

Stan Denski (August 26, 1953 – May 20, 2025) was an American writer, scholar, and critic whose work has focused upon both critical pedagogy and popular culture. His research is divided between the application of critical education theory to university media programs and the study of contemporary popular music and society.

Born Stanislaw Dzieniszewski in Philadelphia, Pennsylvania (the family name was changed in the early 1950s), Denski attended Father Judge High School. He graduated from Clarion University of Pennsylvania with B.S. and M.S. degrees in communication. In the mid-1970s he was a staff video producer and director producing instructional television programming for Southern West Virginia Community and Technical College in Logan and Williamson, WV. In 1990 he received his Ph.D. in Mass Communication (with minors in philosophy and film) jointly from the School of Telecommunications and the Scripps Howard School of Journalism at Ohio University.

In 1986-1987 Denski was a visiting lecturer in Media Studies at The College of Wooster in Wooster, OH. From 1987 to 1990, he was resident lecturer in Media Studies in the Department of Communication Studies at Indiana University-Purdue University at Indianapolis. From 1990 until 1997 he was assistant professor of Media Studies and Director of the Telecommunication Program at IUPUI. In 1993 he was awarded the N.E.T. (National Excellence in Teaching) Grant for $6,000 award to design the course, Introduction to Communication Studies.

In February 1994, he was selected to attend the IRTS International Radio & Television Society) Faculty/Industry Seminar in New York City where his design group won the $1,000 prize for best program design. In May 1995 he was an Invited Visiting Scholar at Ohio University in Athens, OH and presented a series of lectures to Mass Communication faculty and doctoral students.

His published works include the book, Media Education and the (Re)production of Culture (1994, with David Sholle) and numerous journal articles and book chapters. He currently sits on the advisory board of the journal Popular Music & Society.

In 1993 he founded Aether Records, an Indiana-based record label that released both vinyl reissues of rare rock records from the 1960s and 1970s and music by contemporary bands on CD and LP. In 1996, Aether/OR Music became a wholesale distribution and retail mail order company with warehouse and offices based in Indianapolis, IN. In 1997 Denski left his academic position to take the position of President of Aether/OR Music which he held until February 2002.

As writer on popular music, Denski has written liner notes for numerous LPs and CDs (including the notes for all 10 volumes of the compilation series, Love, Peace & Poetry), his music writing has been published in the Dallas Observer, the Cleveland Scene, Patrick Lundborg's Acid Archives, and he was a contributing critic to the 2007 Village Voice Pazz & Jop Poll.

Denski is also a musician, recording artist and producer, working with artists like Jello Biafra and Nick Saloman. In 1997 he formed the band Many Bright Things, releasing three albums between 1996 and 2005 in addition to one album under the name In The Summer Of The Mushroom Honey in 1998. In 2002 he produced the compilation album, Pull Up the Paisley Covers: A Psychedelic Omnibus.

In 2007 and 2008 Denski was employed as the researcher and ghost writer for Think Secure, the online blog of Frank DeFina, then president of Panasonic Systems Solutions America.

Since 2007 Denski has maintained his own blog, These Things Too, featuring new writing on music, politics and the arts.

He died in his sleep May 20, 2025 of kidney failure.
