= Shot Forth Self Living =

Studio album by Medicine
- Released: September 8, 1992
- Recorded: April 1992
- Studios: Hammer, Chatsworth, California
- Genres: Shoegaze; noise pop; trance rock
- Length: 49:21
- Labels: Def American; Creation
- Producer: Brad Laner

Medicine chronology
Shot Forth Self Living (1992)	The Buried Life (1993)

Singles from Shot Forth Self Living
- 1. "Aruca" Released: August 1992; 2. "5ive" Released: February 1993

Shot Forth Self Living is the debut studio album by American rock band Medicine, released on September 8, 1992 on Def American in the United States and on Creation Records in the United Kingdom.

== Critical reception ==
Professional ratings
Review scores
Source	Rating
AllMusic	4.5/5 stars
Chicago Tribune	3/4 stars
Entertainment Weekly	B+
NME	8/10
Pitchfork	6.9/10
Q	4/5 stars

Writing for The New York Times, Simon Reynolds noted that "the effects-laden guitar textures and Beth Thompson's and Brad Laner's androgynous vocals recall English trance rockers of recent years like Spacemen 3 and My Bloody Valentine", saying that Medicine "juxtaposes extremely brutal, grating sounds with incredibly sweet, delicate melodies".

== Track listing ==
No.	Title	Writer(s)	Length
1.	"One More"	Brad Laner	9:08
2.	"Aruca"	Laner, Annette Zilinskas	4:49
3.	"Defective"	Laner	4:10
4.	"A Short Happy Life"	Laner, Beth Thompson	6:39
5.	"5ive"	Laner	3:33
6.	"Sweet Explosion"	Laner, Jim Putnam, Eddie Ruscha, Thompson	3:15
7.	"Queen of Tension"	Laner	4:14
8.	"Miss Drugstore"	Laner, Zilinskas	5:00
9.	"Christmas Song"	Laner	8:33

== Personnel ==
Medicine

- Jim Goodall – drums
- Brad Laner – vocals, guitar, percussion, piano, production
- Jim Putnam – guitar
- Eddie Ruscha – bass guitar, tape, art direction, design
- Beth Thompson – vocals

Production and additional personnel

- Chris Apthorp – engineering
- John Cevetello – engineering on "Aruca"
- Sneaky Pete Kleinow – steel guitar on "A Short Happy Life" and "Christmas Song"
- Joan Mahoney – photography
- Tom Recchion – art direction, design
