= Transcontinental Conspiracy =

Studio album by Vas Deferens Organization and Brad Laner
- Released: 1996
- Recorded: VDO Studios, Dallas, TX
- Genre: Experimental rock
- Length: 51:03
- Label: Quaquaversal Vinyl
- Producer: Matt Castille, Eric Lumbleau, Brad Laner

Vas Deferens Organization chronology
Miasmata (1996)	Transcontinental Conspiracy (1996)	Saturation (1996)

Brad Laner chronology
A Pert Cyclic Omen (1995)	Transcontinental Conspiracy (1996)	Cherry Flavor Night Time (1997)

Transcontinental Conspiracy is an album by Vas Deferens Organization and Brad Laner, released in 1996 by Quaquaversal Vinyl. The album was remastered and re-issued on Niklas Records in 2011, accompanied by the additional track "Scheming Foils".

== Recording ==
Music by Mercury Rev appears in "First Plane Not to Plummet Seaward" and "Monk Fish Liver Transplant Plate". Regarding the band's involvement, Lumbleau has stated: "Their material was generated during a spontaneous pre-gig jam that occurred at our studio while they waited there for an interview that never ultimately transpired. These jams were later integrated into the fabric of our compositions and are featured prominently on two of the CD's four tracks."

== Track listing ==
All music is composed by Brad Laner and Vas Deferens Organization.

No.	Title	Length
1.	"First Plane Not to Plummet Seaward"	16:52
2.	"Monk Fish Liver Transplant Plate"	3:46
3.	"Last Few Days in the Land of Happy Dreams"	20:43
4.	"T"	9:41

2011 remastered CD bonus track
No.	Title	Length
5.	"Scheming Foils"	9:13

== Personnel ==
Adapted from the Transcontinental Conspiracy liner notes.

Musicians

- Matt Castille – instruments, production
- Eric Lumbleau – instruments, production
- Brad Laner – instruments, production, vocals (3)

Additional personnel

- Grasshopper – instruments (2, 3)
- Josh Laner – instruments (4)
- Bryan Polman – instruments (2, 3)
- Jason Russo – instruments (2, 3)
- Suzanne Thorpe – instruments (2, 3)

== Release history ==
Region	Date	Label	Format	Catalog
United States	1996	Quaquaversal Vinyl	CD	QU-02
Poland	2011	Niklas	CD	n/002
