= Sine Sierra =

- J-card

Studio album by Norman Bailer
- Released: 1995
- Label: Lumberjack

Norman Bailer chronology
Sine Sierra (1995)	Media (as The Faint) (1998)

Back Cover

Sine Sierra is The Faint's debut album, released in 1995. At the time, the band was known as Norman Bailer. The album was released by Lumberjack Records on cassette only. Conor Oberst, of Bright Eyes, was in the band at the time. He played guitar and sang backing vocals, as well as being the sole singer on certain songs, including "Willow Wood".

== Track listing ==
1. "Prelude to a Bailer"
2. "Willow Wood"
3. "Open House"
4. "Ginger Washington and Her Amazing Orchestra of Spies"
5. "Gun Smoke"
6. "Spy Hunter" / "Capture the Flag"
7. "40 Years Above Rockafeller Plaza"
8. "Grab Your Lips with Boss Interlude in the Key of G Maj"
9. "Coffin Races"
10. "You Ate the Sandbox"
11. "She's a Palm Reader"
12. "XXX XOXOX"
