= The Buried Life (album) =

Studio album by Medicine
- Released: October 12, 1993
- Recorded: September 1992 – July 1993
- Studios: Hammer (Chatsworth, California)
- Genres: Noise pop; shoegaze
- Length: 55:29
- Label: American
- Producer: Brad Laner

Medicine chronology
Shot Forth Self Living (1992)	The Buried Life (1993)	Her Highness (1995)

Singles from The Buried Life
- 1. "Never Click" Released: December 1993

Professional ratings
Review scores
Source	Rating
AllMusic	4/5 stars
Chicago Tribune	3.5/4 stars
NME	7/10
Pitchfork	8.1/10

The Buried Life is the second album by American rock band Medicine, released on October 12, 1993, by American Recordings.

== Track listing ==
All tracks are written by Medicine.

No.	Title	Length
1.	"The Pink"	5:38
2.	"Babydoll"	3:10
3.	"Slut"	3:55
4.	"She Knows Everything"	4:17
5.	"Something Goes Wrong"	3:13
6.	"Never Click"	6:04
7.	"Fried Awake"	4:47
8.	"Beneath the Sands"	4:38
9.	"Emmeline"	1:27
10.	"I Hear"	5:35
11.	"Live It Down"	5:35
12.	"The Earth Is Soft and White"	7:10

== Personnel ==
Medicine

- Jim Goodall – drums, tape
- Stefanie Fife – cello
- He Goak – bass guitar
- Brad Laner – vocals, guitar, percussion, piano, production
- Miriam Mayer – violin, cello
- Beth Thompson – vocals, tape

Production and design

- Chris Apthorp – engineering, mixing
- Julie Carter – design
- Richard Hasal – mixing
- Judy Koenig – painting
- Medicine – mixing, design
