= Her Highness (album) =

Studio album by Medicine
- Released: August 22, 1995
- Recorded: Cherokee Hollywoodland; Lita's House, Tujunga; The Peach Castle, Noho
- Genres: Noise pop, shoegaze, alternative rock
- Length: 45:43
- Label: American Recordings
- Producers: Brad Laner, Eddy Offord

Medicine chronology
The Buried Life (1993)	Her Highness (1995)	The Mechanical Forces of Love (2003)

Singles from Her Highness
- 1. "Candy Candy" Released: August 1995

Professional ratings
Review scores
Source	Rating
AllMusic	3/5 stars
Chicago Tribune	2/4 stars
The Encyclopedia of Popular Music	2/5 stars
Q	3/5 stars

Her Highness is the third album by American rock band Medicine, released in 1995 by American Recordings. The band broke up after the album's release, and would not record again until 2003's The Mechanical Forces of Love.

== Critical reception ==
The Encyclopedia of Popular Music called the album "almost numbingly introspective, both musically and lyrically." The Chicago Tribune wrote that "for all of its manufactured navel-contemplating, Her Highness is a trance-inducing album due mostly to its languor." The Tampa Bay Times wrote that a "new-found versatility actually opens the heavy-handed Medicine to lighter, ethereal passages ... rather than just feedback-laden noisefests—although the swirling psychedelic jam of 'Heads' may be one of the group's finest efforts."

== Track listing ==
No.	Title	Writer(s)	Length
1.	"All Good Things"	Beth Thompson	5:07
2.	"Wash Me Out"	Brad Laner	4:20
3.	"Candy Candy"	Jim Goodall, Brad Laner, Beth Thompson	5:10
4.	"I Feel Nothing at All"	Brad Laner	3:52
5.	"A Fractured Smile"	Jim Goodall, Brad Laner, Justin Meldal-Johnsen, Beth Thompson	3:48
6.	"Farther Dub"	Brad Laner	1:36
7.	"Farther Down"	Brad Laner	5:12
8.	"Aarhus"	Jim Goodall, Brad Laner, Beth Thompson	3:46
9.	"Seen the Light Alone"	Brad Laner	4:56
10.	"Heads"	Brad Laner, Beth Thompson	7:56

== Personnel ==
Medicine

- Jim Goodall – drums
- Brad Laner – vocals, guitar, bass guitar, keyboards, arrangement, production, engineering
- Beth Thompson – vocals, photography

Production and additional personnel

- David Campbell – violin, viola, arrangement
- Larry Corbett – cello
- David Harlan – design
- Bruce Lampcov – mixing
- Medicine – art direction
- Justin Meldal-Johnsen – bass guitar, clarinet
- Eddy Offord – production, engineering
- Tom Recchion – art direction
