= Brad Laner =

American musician and record producer

- Born: Brad Laner; November 6, 1966 (age 59); Los Angeles, California, U.S.
- Occupations: Musician, songwriter, record producer
- Years active: 1981–present
- Labels: Onion/American Recordings/Warner Bros. Records, Creation, Supreme/Island/PolyGram Records, Zoo/Volcano, Planet Mu, Beggars Banquet, Hometapes

Brad Laner (born November 6, 1966, in Los Angeles, California) is an American musician and record producer best known for his work with the shoegaze band Medicine, which he founded and led.

Prior to Medicine, he was involved in the post-punk outfit Savage Republic, which, according to Pitchfork Media, foreshadowed many ideas later explored in the post-rock genre.

== Career ==
Laner founded his first band, Debt of Nature, at the age of 15 in 1981. He founded Steaming Coils, an experimental avant-rock band (1984–1989).

Laner joined Savage Republic as a percussionist and a keyboard player, and took part in recording two of its albums.

In 1990 he founded shoegaze-noise pop band called Medicine, promoting a do-it-yourself sound. In 1992 Medicine released its debut album, Shot Forth Self Living. In 1994 the band contributed one track to the soundtrack of the movie The Crow and appeared in the movie itself. The band broke up in 1995, briefly reuniting in 2003 as a duo (with Laner and Shannon Lee).

In 1995 he started his solo project Electric Company, which was devoted to IDM, glitch, and avant-garde electronics with some elements of ambient and drone. As Electric Company, he released ten full-length albums in nine years (before ceasing activity in 2004). The same year, he also founded psychedelic supergroup Lusk with the members of Tool and Failure, with whom he released one album, Free Mars. It received a Grammy Award nomination.

In 1996, he collaborated with Dallas-based musical collective Vas Deferens Organization on the album Transcontinental Conspiracy. Laner co-wrote and co-produced the album; several Mercury Rev members were also involved in the recording and producing process. They collaborated again in 1999, this time under his Electric Company moniker, on the album More Pelvis Wick for the Baloney Boners.

In 2007, Laner released his first album under his own name, Neighbor Singing, with the input of Thom Monahan. He then followed it up in 2010 with his second solo release, Natural Selections.

== Discography ==
=== with Debt of Nature ===
- Order: Spoil The Entire State (Harbinger Sound 2013)
- Robin Diamond's Lungs (No Holiday 2025)

cassette releases

- Pets Have Fears Too (Real Big Dog tapes 1981)
- Robin Diamond's Lungs (A.R.P.H. tapes 1982)
- Idiot Stick (Party Sound Tapes 1983)
- Pets Have Fears Two (Party Sound Tapes 1983)
- Food Music (Gleet Audio 1983)
- 1981 Vol. 1 (Jookie Thrills 1983)
- Debt of Nature (Goodall Tapes 1986)
- Order: Spoil The Entire State (VHS) (Goodall Tapes 1986)
- "San Salvador Day" (Goodall Tapes 2014)
- "Salt Meadows" (Lal Lal Lal 2015)
- "Come Flying" (Goodall Tapes 2015)
- "Spring Training" (Goodall Tapes 2015)
- "Small Silver Car" (Lal Lal Lal 2015)
- "The Helix Of Repair" (Lal Lal Lal 2016)

compilation appearances

- Feeble Efforts (New Alliance 1981)
- Mighty Feeble (New Alliance 1982)
- Life is Boring So Why Not Steal This Record (New Underground 1983)
- L.A. Mantra (Trance Port Tapes 1983)
- Live at the Trance Port (Trance Port Tapes 1983)
- Phantom Takes (Trance Port Tapes 1983)
- Give Me That Dog Penis Popsicle (Gleet Audio 1983)
- Sex and Bestiality (DF Sadist School 1984)
- Perpetual State of Oracular Dream (Anomalous 1991)
- "L'Incoronazione" (Hyster Tapes 2015)

=== with Earth Dies Burning ===
- Songs From The Valley of the Bored Teenager 1981-84 (Captured Tracks 2013)

=== with Stahlbau ===
cassette releases

- Todlich Verungluckt (A.R.P.H. tapes 1982)
- Die Macht Der Reichen (Aeon 1983)

=== with Pilgrim State ===
- Effective Spiritual Warfare (New Underground, 1984)

=== with Severed Head in a Bag ===
cassette releases

- "Live" (Goodall Tapes 2014)
- "Delayed Implantation" (Goodall Tapes 2014)

=== with Steaming Coils ===
- Never Creak (Rotary Totem 1986)
- The Tarkington Table (Motiv 1987)
- Breaded (Nate Starkman & Sons CD 1991; reissued Quaquaversal Vinyl 1994; re-reissued Medical Records with bonus "Unfinished 1989" 7-inch E.P. 2016)
- Never Were (Tarkington Table cassette 1987)
- Studio Cassette (Medical Records 2016)

compilation appearances

- Bad Alchemy #9 (No Man's Land 1987)
- LAFMS-The Lowest Form of Music Box Set (Cortical 1997)
- LAFMS-Unboxed (Cortical 1997)

note: the song "Blathering Hemispheres" from the "Never Creak" LP appears on both of the above LAFMS comps credited solely to Rick Potts

=== with To Nije Sala ===
- A Bitter Kermit Haven (split LP with What Makes Donna Twirl) (Ralph 1990)

=== with Savage Republic ===
- Jamahiriya Democratique et Populaire de Sauvage (Fundamental 1988)
- Viva La Rock and Roll 7-inch (IPR 1988)
- Customs (Fundamental 1989)
- Live in Europe 1988 (Nate Starkman & Sons 1989)
- Box Set (Mobilization 2002)
- Procession: An Aural History (LTM 2010)

=== other 1980s releases as Brad Laner ===
cassette releases

- SEP/8363 vols 1-5 (Party Sound Tapes 1982-1984)
- Blind Force (Goodall Tapes 1985)

compilation appearances

- Omniana/Audio Arm 3 cassette magazine (A.R.P.H. 1982)
- L.A. Mantra 2 (Trance Port Tapes 1984)
- Neighborhood Rhythms (Freeway/Rhino 1984)
- Re Records Quarterly vol. 2 (with James Grigsby) (Recommended 1989)
- Hollyword cassette (Freeway/Rhino 1990)

=== with Medicine ===
- Shot Forth Self Living (Def American/Warner Bros. 1992; Reissued with bonus material by Captured Tracks 2012)
- The Buried Life (American Recordings/Warner Bros. 1993; Reissued with bonus material by Captured Tracks 2012)
- Her Highness (American Recordings/Warner Bros. 1995)
- Medicine Box Set (Captured Tracks 2012)
- Always Starting To Stop (live cassette) (Captured Tracks 2012)
- To the Happy Few (Captured Tracks 2013)
- In Session (Captured Tracks 2014)
- Home Everywhere (Captured Tracks 2014)
- Selected Early Recordings (Bandcamp 2018)
- Scarred For Life (Drawing Room 2019)
- Falls (Bandcamp 2020)
- Drugs (MPLS Ltd 2022)
- Her Highness (premiere melange) (Laner Archival Service 2023)
- Silences (Laner Archival Service 2023)
- On The Bed (Laner Archival Service 2024)
- Medicine (Laner Archival Service 2024)
- We'll Run Away (Laner Archival Service 2025)

Singles and EPs

- "Aruca" (Creation 1992)
- "5ive" (a.k.a. "Come Here To Drink Milk") (Creation 1993)
- "Never Click" (Beggars Banquet, 1993)
- "Sounds Of Medicine" (American 1994; Reissued with bonus material by Captured Tracks 2012)
- "Time Baby 3" (Beggars Banquet, 1994)
- "Off The Vine" (double 7-inch) (Ectoplasm, 1995)
- Time Baby 2 (7-inch) (Captured Tracks 2012)

Compilation appearances

- The Crow OST (Atlantic, 1994)
- The Doom Generation OST (American Recordings/Warner Bros., 1994)
- Tigerbeat6 Inc. (Tigerbeat6, 2001)
- Musique Dessinee 01 - Just A Groove ! (Production Dessinee Japan 2006)

=== as Electric Company ===
- A Pert Cyclic Omen (Onion/American Recordings/Warner Bros., 1995)
- Electric Company Plays Amnesia (Supreme/Island/PolyGram, 1997)
- Studio City (Supreme/Island/PolyGram, 1998)
- Omakase (Vinyl Communications, 1999)
- Exitos (Tigerbeat6, 2000)
- Slow Food (Planet Mu, 2001)
- 62-56 (Tigerbeat6, 2001)
- Greatest Hits (Tigerbeat6, 2001)
- It's Hard to Be a Baby (Tigerbeat6, 2003)
- Creative Playthings (Tigerbeat6, 2004)
- 26 Mixes For Love (remixes and compilation appearances) (Bandcamp 2021)

EPs

- Live In Concept 10-inch+7-inch (Krown Pocket 1995)
- The Kahanek Incident (split w/ Furry Things) (Trance Syndicate 1997)
- New 3-inch CD (Fallt Invalid Object Series 2001)
- Greatest Hits Companion 1 (Tigerbeat6 2001)
- Greatest Hits Companion 2 (Tigerbeat6 2001)

Remixes and compilation appearances

- Slow Death in the Metronome Factory (World Domination, 1997)
- Dugga Dugga Dugga (WMO, 1998)
- Knots (Thousand, 1999)
- On-Soluble Words (Epic/SME, 1999)
- Sadovaja- A Sweet Design (Warner Bros. Sweden, 2000)
- Kid606 & Friends vol 1 (Tigerbeat6, 2000)
- American Breakbeat (Klangkreig, 2000)
- Kid606-P.S. You Love Me (Mille Plateaux, 2000)
- Cex - Oops I Did It Again (Tigerbeat6, 2001)
- Attitude (Tigerbeat6, 2000)
- The Cosmic Forces of Mu (Planet Mu, 2001)
- Tigerbeat6 Inc. (Tigerbeat6, 2001)
- Criminal 2 (Planet Mu, 2002)
- $ Vol.2 (Tigerbeat6, 2001)
- $ Vol.6 (Tigerbeat6, 2001)
- Marumari The Remixes (Carpark, 2002)
- 45 Seconds Of (Simballrec, 2002 )
- Lowercase 2 (Bremsstrahlung, 2002)
- Ellen Allien- Weiss.mix (B Pitch Control, 2002)
- American Breakbeat : Rebuilt (Klangkreig, 2002)
- Wrong Application (Tigerbeat6, 2001)
- And The Beat Goes Off (Tigerbeat6, 2002)
- Paws Across America (Tigerbeat6, 2002)
- Good Night (Music To Sleep To) (Tigerbeat6, 2003)
- Stars As Eyes-Loud New Shit (Tigerbeat6, 2003)
- Open up and Say ...@+%_|^{!} (Tigerbeat6, 2003)
- O Superman Remix (Staalplaat, 2003)
- Audio Sponge 1 (Daisyworld Japan, 2003)
- Neighbors Remixing (Adjunct 2009)
- Solypsis -Hybrids (Component 2019)

=== as Amnesia ===
- Cherry Flavor Night Time (Supreme/Island/PolyGram, 1997)
- Lingus (Supreme/Island/PolyGram, 1998)
- Love Story / A Pretty Sight (7-inch) (Krown Pocket, 1997)

=== as Personal Electronics ===
- The Story of Personal Electronics (LOHD, 1998)

Compilation appearance

- Blip, Bleep (soundtracks to imaginary videogames) (Lucky Kitchen, 1998)

=== with Vas Deferens Organization ===
- Transcontinental Conspiracy (Quaquaversal Vinyl, 1996 - reissued on Niklas Records, 2011)
- More Pelvis Wick for the Baloney Boners (Tekito, 1999)

=== with Kraig Grady ===
- Music From The Island of Anaphoria (Tiny Organ, 1998)

=== with Lusk ===
- Free Mars (Volcano/BMG, 1997)

=== with Medicine (2002-04 BL duo with Shannon Lee version) ===
- The Mechanical Forces of Love (Wall of Sound, 2003)
- 2.0 Extraneous (Drawing Room Records, 2017)

EPs

- Wet on Wet (Wall of Sound, 2002)
- I Smile To My Eyes (Wall of Sound, 2003)
- As You Do (Wall of Sound, 2004)

Remixes and compilation appearances

- The Faint - Danse Macabre Remixes (Astralwerks/Caroline/Virgin/EMI, 2003)
- Themroc - Into the Light (Wall of Sound, 2003)
- Wall of Sound 10th Anniversary (Wall of Sound, 2003)
- Labels Series (EMI International, 2004)
- Strictly Dub - Modern Dub Classics (Sunswept, 2005)

=== with North Valley Subconscious Orchestra ===
- The Right Kind of Nothing (Ghostly International, 2006)

=== with the Internal Tulips ===
- Mislead into a Field by a Deformed Deer (Planet Mu, 2010)
- Mellotorn Offline (Bandcamp, 2012)

compilation appearance

- 14 Tracks from Planet Mu (Planet Mu, 2011)

=== post 2000 solo releases as Brad Laner ===
- The Subterranean River Caverns of Los Angeles (CD soundtrack for a book by Dani Tull – private edition, 2006)
- Neighbor Singing (Hometapes, 2007)
- Natural Selections (Hometapes, 2010)
- Nearest Suns (Drawing Room/Hometapes, 2013)
- Micro-Awakenings (online edition Mutant Sounds 2013; LP edition Drawing Room 2016)
- Music For Beautiful Noise (Captured Tracks, 2014)
- For Magnetic Tape (Drawing Room, 2015)
- Elephant Heart Plumb (Midnight Circles, 2018)
- Ligaments 01 - 05 (Captured Tracks, 2019)
- Dozens of digital-only releases on the Bandcamp platform (2020-present ongoing)

Singles and EPs

- Brad Laner / Joensuu 1685 split 12-inch (Splendour Norway 2010)
- Highly Morning / Sideshow 7-inch (Drawing Room 2013)

Remixes & Compilation appearances

- Neighbors Remixing (Adjunct 2009)
- Flossin-Serpents (Overlap 2009)
- Triskaidekaphobia 13,000.00 MilliSeconds (Ratskin 2009)
- I'll Be Hometapes For Christmas (Hometapes 2010)
- Shedding - Tear In The Sun Reimagined (Bandcamp 2011)
- The Neverending Beginning with Lauren Kinney (Hometapes 2011)
- Another Iris - All Tiny Creatures (Hometapes 2012)

=== Brad Laner guest appearances on other artists' releases ===
- Sissy Spacek - Entrance (Shelter Press 2025)
- Dan Boeckner - Boeckner! (Sub Pop 2024)
- Nervous Gender - Music From Hell (deluxe reissue) (Dark Entries 2023)
- Paul B. Cutler - Les Fleurs (In The Red 2023)
- Falty DL - A Nurse to My Patience (Blueberry 2022)
- Lindsey Buckingham - S/T (Reprise 2021)
- The Flying Luttenbachers - Imminent Death (ugEXPLODE/God Records 2019)
- Autumnfair - Watching The Sky (Thom Furhmann Records 2018)
- Sissy Spacek - Expanding Antiverse (Dotsmark 2018)
- Taleen Kali - Soul Songs (Lolipop 2018)
- Mary Epworth - Elytral (Sunday Best 2017)
- Vinyl Williams - Brunei (Company 2016)
- Sissy Spacek - Duration Groups (Helicopter 2016)
- D.D. Dobson - A Halo of Affectation (777 Was 666 2016)
- Wild Nothing - Life of Pause (Captured Tracks 2016)
- Tülips - Doom And Bloom (Lollipop 2015)
- Digital Noise Academy - Synemy (Echo Field 2013)
- M83 - Hurry Up, We're Dreaming (Mute 2011)
- Blinker The Star - We Draw Lines (Nile River 2012)
- The Caribbean - Discontinued Perfume (Hometapes 2011)
- Lauren Kinney - Wail (Bandcamp 2013)
- Lauren Kinney - Riddled (Bandcamp 2011)
- Christopher Willits - Tiger Flower Circle Sun (Ghostly 2010)
- Blinker The Star w/ Lindsey Buckingham - Catch And Release O.S.T. (Sony 2007)
- Christopher Willits - Surf Boundaries (Ghostly 2006)
- Vetiver - To Find Me Gone (DiChristina 2006)
- Brian Eno - Another Day On Earth (Opal 2005)
- Caribou - The Milk Of Human Kindness (Leaf 2005)
- Caribou - Barnowl 12-inch (Leaf 2005)
- Caribou - Marino DVD (Leaf 2005)
- μ-ziq - Bilious Paths (Planet Mu, 2003)
- Kid606 - Down With The Scene (Ipecac 2000)
- Furry Things - Moments Away (Trance Syndicate 1999)
- Blinker The Star - August Everywhere (DreamWorks 1999)
- On - Shifting Skin (Epic 1999)
- Spectacle -Glow In The Dark Soul (Supreme/Island 1998)
- Ventilator - Reseda Spleen (Delmore 1997)
- V3 - Photograph Burns (Onion/American 1996)
- Eenie Meenie EP (Krown Pocket 1996)
- Vas Deferens Organization - Saturation (Aether 1996)
- Patio Collection vol. 2 (w/ Sweetcream USA) (Smilex 1997)
- Solid Eye - Electromagnetic Field and Stream of Consciousness (Senseworks 1994)
- The Black Watch - Amphetamines (Gotta Go 1994)
- Motor Totemist Guild - Shapuno Zoo ( No Man's Land 1988)
- Motor Totemist Guild - Homaggio a Futi (Auf Dem Nil 1988)
- 17 Pygmies- Welcome (Island 1988)
- 17 Pygmies- Missyfish (Nate Starkman and Sons 1991)
- Fourwaycross - On The Other Hand (Nate Starkman and Sons 1989)
- Fourwaycross - Pendulum (Independent Project Records 1993)
- What Slender Young Leaders ! 7-inch (New Alliance 1986)
- Blue Daisies - Wilt (Iridescence 1985)
- Gary Kail / Zurich 1916 - Creative Nihilism (Iridescence 1984)
- John Trubee - Beyond Eternity/Lavender Flesh (Cordelia 1984)
