= Clark Baechle =

American drummer

Clark Alan Baechle (born April 21, 1981) is an American founding member of the Omaha-based electronic/rock band The Faint, along with his brother, Todd Fink. Although he is primarily known for playing drums, he also sings backing vocals and is heavily involved with other aspects of the band's output, such as programming electronic instruments and sequencers, and designing and programming lights for their live shows.

He played guitar in another Nebraskan band, Park Ave., and acted as producer and engineer of their album. He has also participated on many releases and tours for Bright Eyes, playing drums and clarinet. While The Faint was on break following the tour for their 2008 album, Fasciinatiion, Baechle toured and performed with Depressed Buttons, which also included Fink and fellow Faint member Jacob Thiele. For some guest appearances, and when creating remixes for other artists, he uses the stage name Recordist.

== Album appearances ==
- Bright Eyes - There Is No Beginning to the Story (2002)
- Bright Eyes - Lifted or The Story Is in the Soil, Keep Your Ear to the Ground (2002)
- Azure Ray - Hold On Love (2003)
- Cursive - The Ugly Organ (2003)
- Bright Eyes - I'm Wide Awake, It's Morning (2005)
- Bright Eyes - Digital Ash in a Digital Urn (2005)
- Bright Eyes - Cassadaga (2007)
- Bright Eyes - The People's Key (2011)
- Lightspeed Champion - Falling Off the Lavender Bridge (2008)
