= Maids of Gravity =

- Origin: Los Angeles
- Genres: shoegaze, post-grunge, psychedelic rock
- Years active: 1993–2000
- Label: Vernon Yard Recordings
- Members: Ed Ruscha; Craig "Irwin" Levitz; Jim Putnam; Mark Kay; Eugene Goreshter; Brandon "Quazar" Jay; Dean Opseth; Matt Londi

Maids of Gravity was an American rock band from Los Angeles, California, formed in 1993. After three releases on the label Vernon Yard Recordings in the 1990s, the group disbanded in 2000.

== History ==
Maids of Gravity was formed in 1993 by Ed Ruscha and Jim Putnam, both of whom had just left the group Medicine. Craig "Irwin" Levitz, former member of Sun-60, joined on drums to complete the original lineup. According to Ruscha, the band's name came from a musical ensemble he saw performing in a dream. The band signed to Vernon Yard Recordings, a prominent independent label that was owned by the major label Virgin Records, despite the band's overall inexperience. The group's first release was a mini-album, Strange Channel, released in early 1995. It was followed by a self-titled full-length a few months later, produced by Matt Hyde. Beth Thompson, Ruscha and Putnam's former bandmate in Medicine, notably appeared as a guest vocalist on one song. For live performances, Mark Kay was added into the lineup as bassist.

The lead single from Maids of Gravity, "Only Dreaming", was a hit on rock radio, reaching No. 40 on the Billboard Mainstream Rock Tracks chart. The success of the single led to several tours, including with Bush, Matthew Sweet, and God Lives Underwater. Critics described their sound as "highly melodic psychedelic sludge-grunge" and "weaving otherworldly lyrics with drugged-out guitar jams." Peter Margasak wrote that the group "set[s] the hushed, dreamy vocals of Ed Ruscha amid swinging rhythms and artful, psychedelic guitar counterpoint."

In late 1995, Putnam departed from the band in order to form Radar Brothers. He was replaced by guitarist Eugene Goreshter. The band then hired John Cale to produce their follow-up album, The First Second, which arrived in 1996. "Half Awake" was released as a promotional single, but it did not find much airplay. The First Second failed to reach the same commercial or critical heights as Maids of Gravity. Afterwards, Ruscha overhauled the lineup again, as Irwin was replaced by Brandon "Quazar" Jay (former member of Lutefisk) on drums, Kay was replaced by Dean Opseth (another former member of Medicine) on bass, and Gorester was replaced by Matt Londi on guitar. Although the new lineup toured sporadically, no material was recorded, and Vernon Yard also went bankrupt around the same time, which left the band without a label; thus, they quietly disbanded by 2000.

Goreshter went on to become a founding member of Autolux, remaining in the band until 2016. Putnam eventually worked as a producer, studio musician, and mixer for many artists, such as Silversun Pickups, Hope Sandoval, and Matmos, among others. He also traveled as a live technician for The Flaming Lips. Ruscha went on to play in numerous bands after Maids of Gravity's demise, such as Laughing Light of Plenty, Future Pigeon, and The Parels. In addition to using his full name, Ruscha also focused on various solo projects under the aliases Dungeonmaster, Secret Circuit, and Dada Munchamonkey.

== Members ==
- Ed Ruscha – vocals, guitar, bass (1993–2000)
- Craig "Irwin" Levitz – drums (1993–1996)
- Jim Putnam – guitar, piano (1993–1995)
- Mark Kay – bass (1995–1996)
- Eugene Goreshter – guitar (1995–1996)
- Brandon "Quazar" Jay – drums (1996–2000)
- Dean Opseth – bass (1996–2000)
- Matt Londi – guitar (1996–2000)

=== Timeline ===
Color denotes main live duty.

== Discography ==
Studio albums

- Strange Channel (Vernon Yard Recordings, 1995)
- Maids of Gravity (Vernon Yard, 1995)
- The First Second (Vernon Yard, 1996)

Singles

- "Only Dreaming" (Vernon Yard, 1995)
- "Your Ground" (Vernon Yard, 1995)
- "Half Awake" (Vernon Yard, 1996)
