= Miasmata (album) =

Studio album by Christopher and Vas Deferens Organization
- Released: 1996
- Genre: Experimental rock
- Length: 44:32
- Label: Womb Tunes
- Producer: Matt Castille, Christopher Moock

Vas Deferens Organization chronology
Miasmata (1996)	Transcontinental Conspiracy (1996)

Miasmata is an album by Vas Deferens Organization and Christopher Moock, released in 1996 through Womb Tunes.

== Track listing ==
All music is composed by Matt Castille and Christopher Moock.

Side one
No.	Title	Length
1.	"[untitled]"	15:08
2.	"[untitled]"	5:08

Side two
No.	Title	Length
1.	"[untitled]"	24:15

== Personnel ==
Adapted from the Miasmata liner notes.

Musicians

- Matt Castille – instruments, production, recording
- Eric Lumbleau – instruments
- Christopher Moock – instruments, production, recording

Production and additional personnel

- Christy Castille-Wittman – cover art

== Release history ==
Region	Date	Label	Format	Catalog
United States	1996	Womb Tunes	CD, LP	4
