= The Story of Personal Electronics =

Studio album by Personal Electronics
- Released: May 26, 1998
- Genre: Electronic
- Length: 70:45
- Label: LOHD
- Producer: Brad Laner

Brad Laner chronology
Studio City (1998)	The Story of Personal Electronics (1998)	Lingus (1998)

The Story of Personal Electronics is an album by Personal Electronics, released on August 8, 1995 through LOHD. It is the only album Brad Laner released under the moniker. John Payne of the LA Weekly described the music as "nerve-racking", noting that "Laner’s getting more immersed in the newer music technology, while exploring the benefits of simplicity."

== Track listing ==
All tracks are written by Brad Laner

No.	Title	Length
1.	"[untitled]"	0:41
2.	"[untitled]"	1:10
3.	"[untitled]"	6:32
4.	"[untitled]"	3:24
5.	"[untitled]"	2:57
6.	"[untitled]"	3:50
7.	"[untitled]"	3:14
8.	"[untitled]"	1:42
9.	"[untitled]"	1:20
10.	"[untitled]"	3:51
11.	"[untitled]"	0:58
12.	"[untitled]"	0:24
13.	"[untitled]"	0:21
14.	"[untitled]"	0:10
15.	"[untitled]"	1:42
16.	"[untitled]"	0:11
17.	"[untitled]"	1:02
18.	"[untitled]"	1:24
19.	"[untitled]"	0:35
20.	"[untitled]"	0:51
21.	"[untitled]"	1:17
22.	"[untitled]"	1:02
23.	"[untitled]"	30:21
24.	"[untitled]"	1:41

== Personnel ==
- Brad Laner – instruments, production
