= A Pert Cyclic Omen =

Studio album by Electric Company
- Released: August 8, 1995
- Genre: Electronic; Ambient techno
- Length: 63:37
- Label: Onion/American Recordings/Warner Bros. Records; 14513 (first pressing); 43053 (second pressing)
- Producer: Brad Laner

Brad Laner chronology
A Pert Cyclic Omen (1995)	Transcontinental Conspiracy (1996)

Professional ratings
Review scores
Source	Rating
Allmusic	4.5/5 stars

A Pert Cyclic Omen is the debut album of Electric Company, released on August 8, 1995, on Onion/American Recordings. Each of its track titles is an anagram of the band name.

== Track listing ==
All tracks are written by Brad Laner.

No.	Title	Length
1.	"P.A. Intercom Cycle"	7:08
2.	"Polymeric Accent"	4:44
3.	"Elm Crypt Oceanic"	8:44
4.	"A Pert Cyclic Omen"	6:36
5.	"Electro Amp Cynic"	5:02
6.	"Come Circa Plenty"	8:48
7.	"Cyclic Pee Matron"	5:25
8.	"In Compact Celery"	3:58
9.	"Cyclopean Metric"	6:35
10.	"I Can Cop My Tercel"	6:38

== Personnel ==
- Brad Laner – instruments, production
