= Queas and Art =

Compilation album by Vas Deferens Organization
- Released: 1998
- Recorded: 1992–1995
- Genre: Experimental rock
- Length: 53:57
- Label: Eerie Materials

Vas Deferens Organization chronology
Sweat Your Cheeses, But Not in My Salad (1997)	Queas and Art (1998)	The Idiot Parade (1998)

Queas and Art is a compilation album by Vas Deferens Organization, released in 1998 through Eerie Materials. It contains material from the band's first five cassette tapes, dating from 1992 to 1995.

== Track listing ==
All music is composed by Vas Deferens Organization.

No.	Title	Length
1.	"Müz"	11:38
2.	"Filament"	2:36
3.	"Mahogany Species in Tiki Paddleboats"	3:23
4.	"Apparition"	5:47
5.	"Kazoo Jajouka"	4:46
6.	"Fatwa"	2:58
7.	"Wald Lied"	3:49
8.	"Fartkwerk"	3:06
9.	"6.5 X 6 1/2"	6:31
10.	"Barbra Space"	3:36
11.	"Unfettered"	4:12
12.	"Hillbilly Horse"	1:35

== Personnel ==
- Regan Boon
- Craig Carlton
- Matt Castille
- Barbara Cohen
- Jason Cohen
- Eric Lumbleau
- Breck Outland
