= Danse Macabre (The Faint album) =

2001 studio album by the Faint

Studio album by The Faint
- Released: August 21, 2001
- Genres: New wave; synth-rock; dance-punk
- Length: 35:05
- Label: Saddle Creek
- Producers: The Faint and Mike Mogis

The Faint chronology
Blank-Wave Arcade Remixes (2000)	Danse Macabre (2001)	Danse Macabre Remixes (2003)

Singles from Danse Macabre
- 1. "Agenda Suicide" Released: 2002; 2. "The Conductor" Released: 2003

Professional ratings
Review scores
Source	Rating
Pitchfork Media	(7.8/10)
AllMusic	3/5 stars

Danse Macabre is the third studio album by the rock band The Faint. It was released on August 21, 2001, in the U.S. and roughly a year later in the UK, by Saddle Creek Records.

The first pressing of Danse Macabre on vinyl and CD included a different, unauthorized photo that led to them being pulled and having the covers re-printed with an image of The Faint member Dapose.

The album was followed in 2003 by the Danse Macabre Remixes. The remix album includes mixes by Photek, Junior Sanchez and Paul Oakenfold, among others.

== Track listing ==
=== Original Release ===
No.	Title	Length
1.	"Agenda Suicide"	3:58
2.	"Glass Danse"	3:00
3.	"Total Job"	2:17
4.	"Let the Poison Spill from Your Throat"	4:02
5.	"Your Retro Career Melted"	3:51
6.	"Posed to Death"	3:09
7.	"The Conductor"	4:43
8.	"Violent"	5:37
9.	"Ballad of a Paralysed Citizen"	4:28

Note: The vinyl version moves "Violent" to track five, putting it on side 1.

=== Deluxe edition ===
Disc one
No.	Title	Length
1.	"Agenda Suicide"	3:58
2.	"Glass Danse"	3:00
3.	"Total Job"	2:17
4.	"Let the Poison Spill from Your Throat"	4:02
5.	"Your Retro Career Melted"	3:51
6.	"Posed to Death"	3:09
7.	"The Conductor"	4:43
8.	"Violent"	5:37
9.	"Ballad of a Paralysed Citizen"	4:28

Disc two
No.	Title	Length
1.	"Take Me to the Hospital"	4:08
2.	"Mote"	3:54
3.	"Dust"	3:54
4.	"Falling Out of Love at This Volume"	3:54
5.	"The Conductor (Thin White Duke remix)"	7:53
6.	"Glass Danse (Out Hud remix)"	7:00

A DVD of archival video footage, live projection videos, the "Agenda Suicide" music video, and live footage is also included in the deluxe edition.

== Credits ==
- Written and performed by the Faint
- Gretta Cohn – cello on 3, 8, 9
- Geraldine Vo – Vietnamese job list vocal and its translation on 3
- Melix Severin, Gretta Cohn, Kathleen Massara – vocal atmosphere on 8
- P. Anka – verse inspiration on 9
- A.J. Mogis – bowed bass on 9
- Original cover photo by Jim Newberry
- All songs (C) Grammar Out Of Context (SESAC)
- Booking: Eric Dimenstein / ground control touring
- Engineered and produced by Mike Mogis and The Faint at Presto! Recording Studios, 135 S. 19th St., Lincoln, Nebraska
- Mastered by Doug Van Sloun at Studio B
