= Egowerk =

Studio album by the Faint
- Released: March 15, 2019
- Recorded: 2018–2019
- Studios: Enamel (Omaha, Nebraska)
- Genres: Dance-punk, new wave, post-punk revival
- Length: 46:30
- Label: Saddle Creek
- Producer: The Faint (Clark Baechle)

The Faint chronology
Doom Abuse (2014)	Egowerk (2019)

Egowerk is the seventh studio album by American band the Faint, released March 15, 2019 by Saddle Creek Records. The group announced the record on December 7, 2018 alongside lead single "Child Asleep" and framed its 11 tracks as a study of social media, modern society, and ego. Drummer Clark Baechle produced, recorded, and mixed the album at Enamel in Omaha, Nebraska, with Ted Jensen and Justin Shturtz handling mastering at Sterling Sound. The release is the first Faint studio album with keyboardist Graham Ulicny following Jacob Thiele's 2016 departure. It drew generally favorable reviews, including a Metacritic score of 70 out of 100 based on four professional publications.

== Background and recording ==
Saddle Creek announced Egowerk on December 7, 2018, confirming the 11-track sequence and releasing "Child Asleep" with a video. The label positioned the record as a response to online culture and mediated ego. Album credits note that Baechle handled production, recording, and mixing at Enamel in Omaha, Nebraska, with Ted Jensen and Justin Shturtz completing the master at Sterling Sound. In a Talkhouse essay, Baechle described the project as the first full-length by the lineup of Todd Fink, Clark Baechle, Dapose, and Graham Ulicny, written after the 2016 compilation CAPSULE:1999-2016.

== Composition and themes ==
Saddle Creek describes Egowerk as exploring social media discourse and mediated identity while rooted in the band's electronic dance-punk sound. The band describes the LP as "an 11-track deep-dive into themes on modern society, the internet, and ego, specifically social media and its dark effects." Opener "Child Asleep" reprises the group's early-2000s urgency while presenting the lyric "If I was wise, I would see I'm a child still asleep," which Todd Fink links to a desire for greater awareness. Fink elaborated that "It would be amazing if I could wake up from the world that I think I'm awake in already" and argued that gurus demonstrate the clarity the band seeks. Despite the dystopian tone, he and Clark Baechle stressed optimism, with Fink stating "The more you learn about any issue, any issue at all, the more you understand that it's more complicated than you think," advocating for humility in social discourse.

AllMusic categorizes the album under Alternative/Indie Rock and New Wave/Post-Punk Revival.

== Release and promotion ==
Egowerk reached stores on March 15, 2019 in LP, CD, and digital formats via Saddle Creek under catalog number LBJ-279. Pre-release tracks included "Child Asleep" (December 2018), "Alien Angel" (January 29, 2019), and "Quench the Flame" (March 11, 2019). The track "Young & Realistic" first appeared in 2016 and was later sequenced into the album.

== Critical reception ==
Professional ratings
Aggregate scores
Source	Rating
Metacritic	70/100
Review scores
Source	Rating
AllMusic	entry
Exclaim!	7/10 review
Pitchfork	6.5/10 review
Under the Radar	6.5/10 review

The review aggregator Metacritic assigned Egowerk a score of 70 out of 100 based on four professional reviews. Pitchfork critic Evan Rytlewski wrote that the album examines social media's effects while preserving the group's "urgent physicality". Exclaim! highlighted the band's return to slick programming and a dance-floor focus, and Under the Radar published a mixed-positive assessment that likened the release to the group's early-2000s work.

== Track listing ==
1. "Child Asleep" – 4:39
2. "Chameleon Nights" – 3:32
3. "Life's a Joke" – 4:52
4. "Alien Angel" – 3:38
5. "Egowerk" – 4:52
6. "Own My Eyes" – 3:48
7. "Source of the Sun" – 4:20
8. "Another World" – 3:34
9. "Quench the Flame" – 4:46
10. "Young & Realistic" – 4:56
11. "Automaton" – 3:33

== Personnel ==
- The Faint – performance, songwriting, production
- Clark Baechle – production, recording, mixing
- Ted Jensen – mastering (Sterling Sound)
- Justin Shturtz – mastering (Sterling Sound)
- Todd Fink – artwork
- Orenda Fink – songwriting (tracks 2, 5, 9)
- Morgan Meyn Nagler – songwriting (tracks 2, 5, 9)
