= Sweat Your Cheeses, But Not in My Salad =

Studio album by Vas Deferens Organization
- Released: November 4, 1997
- Recorded: October 1996–November 1996 at VDO Studios, Dallas, Texas
- Genre: Experimental rock
- Length: 49:26
- Label: Charnel Music
- Producer: Matt Castille, Eric Lumbleau

Vas Deferens Organization chronology
Zyzzybalubah (1997)	Sweat Your Cheeses, But Not in My Salad (1997)	Queas and Art (1998)

Professional ratings
Review scores
Source	Rating
Allmusic	4/5 stars

Sweat Your Cheeses, But Not in My Salad is the third album by Vas Deferens Organization, released on November 4, 1997, through Charnel Music. Inspired by Nurse with Wound's debut album, the band included a list of five-hundred and ninety-seven bands that they deemed important on the inside of the CD's booklet.

== Track listing ==
All music is composed by Vas Deferens Organization.

No.	Title	Length
1.	"Reverie"	3:47
2.	"Whirling Dervish"	5:18
3.	"The Matmos"	6:13
4.	"Modular Squad"	7:47
5.	"Boarding Instructions for Bird Carousels"	7:28
6.	"Alpine Gamelan"	3:53
7.	"Tao City Hovercraft"	8:12
8.	"Cyclone"	6:48

== Personnel ==
Vas Deferens Organization

- Brian Artwick – instruments
- Matt Castille – instruments, production, engineering
- Eric Lumbleau – instruments, production, cover art

Production and additional personnel

- Robert Cortinas – drums, vocals on "Boarding Instructions for Bird Carousels"
- Omar Guerra – drums
- Robin Kennon – drums
- Jeff Ross – drums
- Sharon Valverde – keyboards on "Whirling Dervish"
