= Creative Playthings (album) =

Studio album by Electric Company
- Released: October 5, 2004
- Recorded: Lab of Happy Dreams, Encino, CA
- Genre: IDM
- Length: 42:11
- Label: Tigerbeat6
- Producer: Brad Laner

Brad Laner chronology
It's Hard to Be a Baby (2003)	Creative Playthings (2004)	Neighbor Singing (2007)

Professional ratings
Review scores
Source	Rating
Allmusic	3.5/5 stars
Pitchfork Media	(7.1/10)

Creative Playthings is the seventh album by Electric Company, released on October 5, 2004 through Tigerbeat6.

== Track listing ==
All tracks are written by Brad Laner.

No.	Title	Length
1.	"Stand Close, Don't Flatter Yourself"	2:22
2.	"A Rainbow of Traction"	2:21
3.	"The Crab Eating Fox"	2:03
4.	"Early Teeth"	2:10
5.	"Theme from the Mushroom Shaped Tongue"	2:21
6.	"Is There Another Door to Door?"	2:34
7.	"Cancer and My Name Is Larry"	2:00
8.	"Crates of Dead Orange Markers"	1:29
9.	"Last Anus for 17 Miles"	2:21
10.	"Jarhead"	2:31
11.	"Vernal Blue Extract"	2:53
12.	"Recalcitrant Remote Comptroller"	2:10
13.	"Eighteen Hard Feelings"	2:36
14.	"She'll Be in Foal Again"	2:01
15.	"Murexes and Sacoglossans"	2:06
16.	"The Purveyor of Delusion"	2:17
17.	"Other Numbers Besides Locomotion"	2:17
18.	"Little Chachalaca"	3:39

== Personnel ==
- Brad Laner – vocals, instruments, production
- Chris Pitman – synthesizer
- Tim Saputo – design
- Terryn Westbrook – vocals
