= It's Hard to Be a Baby =

Studio album by Electric Company
- Released: February 4, 2003
- Recorded: May 2001–October 2002 at Lab of Happy Dreams, Encino, CA
- Genre: IDM
- Length: 44:54
- Label: Tigerbeat6
- Producer: Brad Laner

Brad Laner chronology
Greatest Hits (2001)	It's Hard to Be a Baby (2003)	Creative Playthings (2004)

It's Hard to Be a Baby is the sixth album by Electric Company, released on February 4, 2003 through Tigerbeat6.

Alexis Georgopoulos of XLR8R described it as "Quite fantastic, and grown-up, too."

== Track listing ==
All tracks are written by Brad Laner.

No.	Title	Length
1.	"The Golden Ratio"	1:07
2.	"It Is Not That Very True"	5:18
3.	"Hi Ho the Carrion Crow"	2:55
4.	"Black Beauty"	3:37
5.	"The Lifestyle"	4:20
6.	"Eatings"	2:32
7.	"A Warm Transfer"	3:20
8.	"I Shall Choice My Self"	3:56
9.	"Tu M'Ennuis"	2:43
10.	"Take the Moon With the Teeth"	2:37
11.	"A Good Top Tongue"	2:28
12.	"You Break My Head"	6:26
13.	"Camberwell Carrot"	3:35

== Personnel ==
- Brad Laner – vocals, guitar, synthesizer, programming, production
