= Lingus =

Studio album by Amnesia
- Released: June 14, 1998
- Recorded: Lab of Happy Dreams, Encino, CA
- Genre: Shoegaze
- Length: 73:55
- Label: Supreme
- Producer: Brad Laner

Brad Laner chronology
The Story of Personal Electronics (1998)	Lingus (1998)	More Pelvis Wick for the Baloney Boners (1999)

Professional ratings
Review scores
Source	Rating
AllMusic	2.5/5 stars
Pitchfork Media	5.0/10

Lingus is a studio album by the rock band Amnesia. It was released on June 14, 1998, through Supreme Recordings.

== Track listing ==
All tracks are written by Brad Laner, except where noted.

No.	Title	Writer(s)	Length
1.	"Love Story"		4:46
2.	"Drop Down"		5:10
3.	"Swimming Lessons"		4:17
4.	"Salty"		3:09
5.	"Let You Down Again"		4:26
6.	"I'll Wait Forever More"	Brad Laner, Josh Laner	3:36
7.	"Train Try"		4:28
8.	"The Sensual Corgi"	Brad Laner, Justin Meldal-Johnsen	1:15
9.	"Handful of Flies"	Brad Laner, Josh Laner	3:14
10.	"Pastry Dog"		4:10
11.	"Mind Your Head"	Brad Laner, Josh Laner	5:19
12.	"Turtle Song"	Brad Laner, Josh Laner	3:40
13.	"Leaving"	Brad Laner, Josh Laner	26:25

== Personnel ==
- Beck – harmonica on "Drop Down"
- Larry Corbett – cello
- Peter Grant – cover art
- Brad Laner – vocals, instruments, production, engineering, mixing
- Josh Laner – drums, percussion
- Justin Meldal-Johnsen – bass clarinet on "The Sensual Corgi"
- Juno Watt – vocals on "Train Try"
