= Aether Records =

Aether Records is an Indianapolis, Indiana-based record label that reissues rare rock records from the 1960s and 1970s as well as contemporary music in a neo psychedelic style.

Aether Records grew out of the OR Records label which was founded in Indianapolis in 1993 by two local collectors (Jade Hubertz and Stan Denski joined by a third partner, Rick Wilkerson, the following year) who reissued the 1977 album “Into You” by the Indianapolis band, McKay in an edition of 300 vinyl copies in 1993.

== Releases ==
A total of fourteen 12-inch records, one 10-inch record, one 7-inch record and 3 CDs were released on the OR Records label:

- McKay “Into You”
- Rayne - Same
- McKay “Into You Take Two”
- Smokin’ Willie - Same
- Locksley Hall - Same
- Wildfire “Smokine’”
- Fairfield Sky - Same
- Dawnwind “Looking Back on the Future”
- Anonymous “Inside the Shadow”
- J Rider “No Longer Anonymous”
- Many Bright Things – Same (box set edition of 300 copies)
- Windopane “See?” (LP & CD)
- Windopane “Lucky Catatonia” (LP & CD)
- George Brigman & Split “I Can Hear the Ants Dance”^{1}
- Creamy – Same
- Problematics “Blown Out” (10-inch)
- Chrome Hudson “Downtown Beirut”/”Nothin’” (7 inch single)
- McKay “IntoYou” (CD plus bonus)

Ten LPs and six CDs were released on the Aether (and Aether Archives) label:

- The Aether Records Box^{2}
- Tombstone Vallentine "Hidden World"
- Many Bright Things “Birds Of Impossible Color”^{3}
- In The Summer Of The Mushroom Honey - Same
- Kaminumada Yohji “Katana”
- Mushroom - Same
- Vas Deferens Organization "Saturation"
- Vas Deferens Organization "Zyzzybaloubab" (double LP pressed at 45 rpm)
- Mazinga Phaser “Cruising in the Neon Glories of the New American Night”
- The Aether Limited Vinyl Series Box ^{4} (4 LPs)
- The Aether Records Sampler: "Set the Controls for the Heart of the Aether."
- Tombstone Valentine “Hidden World” (CD mix)
- Anonymous/J Rider (2 LPs on 1 CD)
- Various Artists: "Pull Up the Paisley Covers"
- In The Summer of the Mushroom Honey (expanded CD)

== Notes ==
1. There were 2 versions of the George Brigman LP issued simultaneously. One regular edition of 1000 copies and a limited edition of 375 numbered copies in a paste-on sleeve and hand drawn labels.
2. Promotional box set, 3 colored vinyl pressings of Tombstone Valentine, Vas Deferens Organization “Saturation” and Mazinga Phaser “Cruising in the Neon Glories of the New American Night.” 200 copies made.
3. The Aether Limited Vinyl Series was a series of 4 albums, each released in pressings of 475 copies and each in a top-loading textured red heavy cardboard sleeve. The albums were Many Bright Things “Birds Of Impossible Color”; In The Summer Of The Mushroom Honey; Kaminamata Yohji “Katana”; Mushroom – Same.
4. Issued after the close of the label, a numbered edition of only 18 copies of a four LP box set containing each of the four albums in the Aether Limited Vinyl Series.
