= To the Happy Few =

Studio album by Medicine
- Released: August 6, 2013
- Genre: Noise pop, shoegaze
- Length: 41:27
- Label: Captured Tracks

Medicine chronology
The Mechanical Forces of Love (2003)	To the Happy Few (2013)	Home Everywhere (2014)

Singles from To the Happy Few
- 1. "Long As The Sun" Released: April 9, 2013

Professional ratings
Aggregate scores
Source	Rating
Metacritic	77/100
Review scores
Source	Rating
AllMusic	4.5/5 stars
Consequence of Sound	4/5 stars
Exclaim!	8/10
NME	7/10
Pitchfork	(7.2/10)

To the Happy Few is the fifth studio album by American rock band Medicine, released in August 2013 by the Captured Tracks label.

== Track listing ==
No.	Title	Length
1.	"Long as the Sun"	5:13
2.	"It's Not Enough"	3:17
3.	"Burn It"	4:09
4.	"Holy Crimes"	3:17
5.	"The End of the Line"	4:14
6.	"Butterfly's Out Tonight"	4:26
7.	"All You Need to Know"	3:35
8.	"Find Me Always"	4:44
9.	"Pull the Trigger"	3:45
10.	"Daylight"	4:47
