= Mazinga Phaser =

American space rock band

- Origin: Denton, Texas, United States
- Genres: Chamber pop, space rock
- Years active: 1993–2000
- Labels: Idol
- Past members: Jessica Nelson; Cole Wheeler; Eric Hermeyer; Mike Throneberry; Mwanza "Wanz" Dover; Travis Williams

Mazinga Phaser was a psychedelic space rock group from Denton, Texas active during the latter half of the 1990s.

== History ==
Formed in 1993, the initial line-up was Jessica Nelson (vocals/keyboards), Cole Wheeler (bass), Mwanza "Wanz" Dover (guitar/programming), Eric Hermeyer (guitar), and Travis Williams (drums). Mike Throneberry later replaced Travis Williams on drums. The group's debut album, Cruising in the Neon Glories of the New American Night was released in 1996 on Aether Records. The band relocated to Fort Worth, and signed to Idol Records who issued the group's second album, Abandinallhope, in late 1997, followed by the Counting Breaths EP two years later. Dover left to form The Falcon Project, with the rest of the band carrying on for a third album, Dissatisfied Customers of Hallucination, in 2000, after which they split up. The band's "Dream of Lost Rivers" was used in David Gordon Green's 2001 film George Washington.

== Discography ==
- Cruising in the Neon Glories of the New American Night (1996) Aether
- Abandinallhope (1997) Idol Records
- Counting Breaths EP (1999) Idol Records
- Dissatisfied Customers of Hallucination (2000) Idol Records
