= Home Everywhere =

Studio album by Medicine
- Released: October 28, 2014
- Genre: Noise pop, shoegaze
- Length: 41:39
- Label: Captured Tracks

Medicine chronology
To the Happy Few (2013)	Home Everywhere (2014)

Professional ratings
Aggregate scores
Source	Rating
Metacritic	74/100
Review scores
Source	Rating
AllMusic	4/5 stars
Consequence of Sound	3.5/5 stars

Home Everywhere is the sixth studio album by American rock band Medicine, released in October 2014 on the Captured Tracks label.

== Track listing ==
No.	Title	Length
1.	"The Reclaimed Girl"	3:43
2.	"Turning"	3:37
3.	"Move Along / Down The Road"	3:50
4.	"Don't Be Slow"	3:18
5.	"Cold Life"	3:19
6.	"They Will Not Die"	3:27
7.	"It's All About You"	4:07
8.	"The People"	4:50
9.	"Home Everywhere"	11:28
