= The Faint =

American dance-punk band

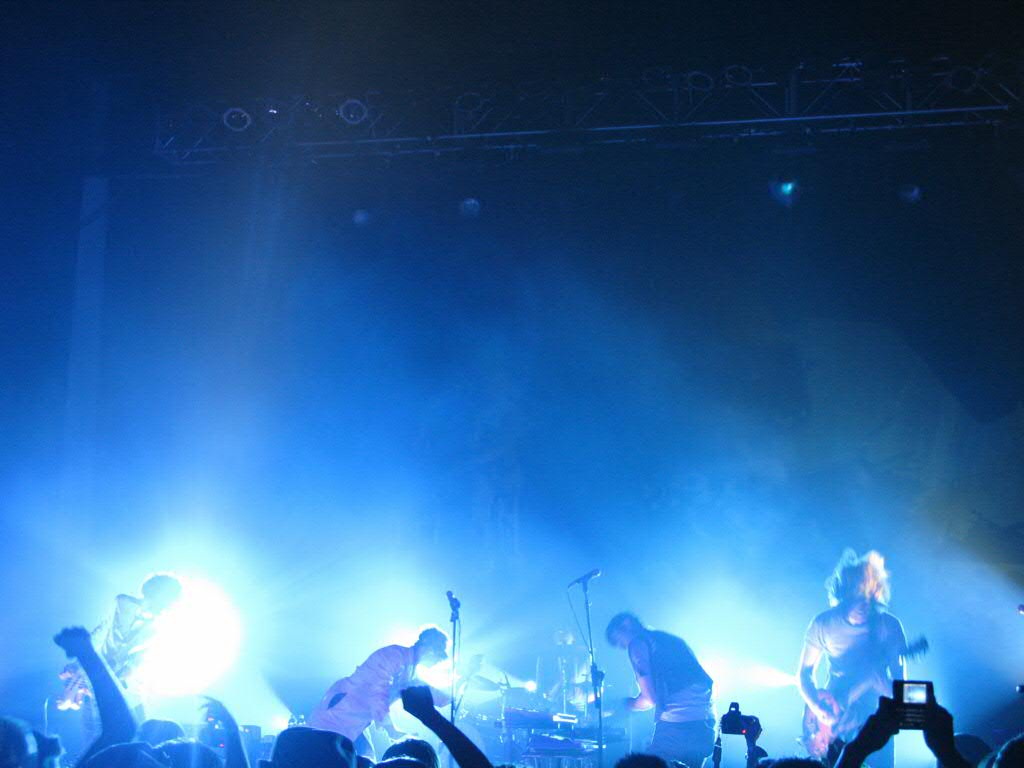
- The Faint live on tour 2008

Background information
- Origin: Omaha, Nebraska
- Genre: Dance-punk
- Years active: 1995–present
- Labels: Saddle Creek, Astralwerks
- Members: Todd Fink; Graham Ulicny; Dapose; Clark Baechle
- Past members: Conor Oberst; Matt Bowen; Joel Petersen; Jacob Thiele (deceased)
- Website: www.thefaint.com

The Faint is an American dance-punk band from Omaha, Nebraska. They are members of the Saddle Creek Records collective. Founded in 1995 as Norman Bailer by vocalist Todd Fink, drummer Clark Baechle, and multi-instrumentalist Joel Petersen, the project briefly featured Bright Eyes frontman Conor Oberst before solidifying its lineup and touring alongside labelmates. The synth-driven albums Blank-Wave Arcade 1999 and Danse Macabre 2001 earned the group an underground following on the United States club circuit.

Since 2016 the band has featured Fink, Baechle, guitarist Dapose, and keyboardist Graham Ulicny while turning down major-label offers to remain part of the Saddle Creek community and releasing the career retrospective CAPSULE:1999-2016 and the studio album Egowerk in 2019.

== History ==
=== Early years as Norman Bailer (1995–1997) ===
Todd Fink, Clark Baechle, and Joel Petersen formed the project in Omaha in 1995 and performed briefly as Norman Bailer. The trio spent much of its youth skateboarding until Fink's knee problems redirected their energy toward songwriting. Gigs around Omaha helped secure a contract with Saddle Creek Records, although the group's early singles struggled to find an audience.

=== The Faint and Blank-Wave Arcade (1997–2000) ===
The group soon adopted the Faint name and began assembling songs around sequencers, drum machines, and analog keyboards, marking a shift away from the guitar-centered material of the Norman Bailer period.

Matt Bowen joined for the debut album Media, then Jacob Thiele replaced him in late 1998, while Ethan Jones briefly handled bass duties. Touring across the United States previewed the dance-oriented material that surfaced on Blank-Wave Arcade in 1999 and earned the band an underground reputation. They also released a remix album, Blank-Wave Arcade Remixes in 2000.

=== Danse Macabre and underground success (2000–2004) ===
By the end of that cycle, the group had pivoted fully to a synth-punk identity, centering sequenced bass and a lighting-heavy stage production that became a hallmark of later shows.

Jones left as the group developed Danse Macabre, so Petersen split his time between bass and guitar while new member Dapose added a heavier guitar presence. Before releasing their next studio album, Astralwerks issued the 2003 remix album, Danse Macabre Remixes, which featured contributions from top electronic remixers, including Stuart Price (Thin White Duke), Paul Oakenfold, and Photek. Wet from Birth followed in 2004 after sessions with producer Mike Mogis, and longtime collaborator Conor Oberst later recalled that the band declined a major label offer in order to remain with Saddle Creek. The group expanded its touring production during this period, pairing tightly synchronized electronics with a high-intensity light show.

=== Fasciinatiion and independent years (2008–2016) ===
The Faint left Saddle Creek in 2008 and created the blank.wav imprint to release Fasciinatiion on August 5, 2008. "The Geeks Were Right" led the release cycle, and a North American co-headlining tour with Ladytron supported the album. Baechle and Fink simultaneously pursued remix work and DJ sets under the Depressed Buttons name. After regrouping, the band issued a new full-length in 2014, titled Doom Abuse, writing and recording quickly to emphasize a rawer, faster sound before returning to headlining tours.

During this period, the band performed the song "Teach Me Teacher" on the children's program Yo Gabba Gabba! in the third season episode "School", which aired September 19, 2010. Saddle Creek issued a deluxe edition of Danse Macabre on October 30, 2012 with remastering, outtakes, and archival video, and the band toured North America performing the album in full.

=== Return, Egowerk, and reissues (2016–present) ===
Following their independent period, The Faint returned to Saddle Creek Records for subsequent releases and reissues. In 2016 the band released the retrospective Capsule:1999-2016, which included the new track "Young and Realistic", and toured with Gang of Four. Graham Ulicny of Reptar joined on keyboards in 2016, replacing Thiele and expanding the live arrangement. The Faint followed with a new studio album, Egowerk, in March 2019, returning to their electronic roots with a mix of new wave and synth-punk influences. Thiele died on February 13, 2020.

In March 2025 they released a twenty-fifth anniversary deluxe edition of Blank-Wave Arcade alongside a twentieth anniversary edition of Wet from Birth, each packaged with remasters, remixes, and archival recordings. The band described the reissues as a chance to recontextualize the turn of the century albums and to circulate period-specific extras alongside newly remastered audio.

== Members ==
=== Current members ===
- Todd Fink – lead vocals, keyboards, rhythm guitar (1995–present)
- Clark Baechle – drums, percussion (1995–present)
- Michael "Dapose" Dappen – lead guitar, bass (2001–present)
- Graham Ulicny – keyboards, backing vocals (2016–present)

=== Former members ===
- Conor Oberst – lead guitar, backing vocals (1995)
- Matt Bowen – bass, keyboards (1995–1998)
- Ethan Jones – bass (1998-1999)
- Jacob Thiele – keyboards, backing vocals (1998–2016, died 2020)
- Joel Petersen – lead guitar (1995–2008), bass, programming (1999-2008)

== Discography ==
=== Albums ===
==== Studio albums ====
Year	Album details	US	US Indie
1995	Sine Sierra (as Norman Bailer): Released: 1995; Label: Lumberjack (LBJ-08); Formats: cassette (CS)	—	—
1998	Media: Released: 1998; Label: Saddle Creek (LBJ-21); Format: CD	—	—
1999	Blank-Wave Arcade: Released: November 1, 1999; Label: Saddle Creek (LBJ-28); Format: CD, LP	—	—
2001	Danse Macabre: Released: August 21, 2001; Label: Saddle Creek (LBJ-37); Format: CD, LP	—	—
2004	Wet from Birth: Released: September 14, 2004; Label: Saddle Creek (LBJ-67); Format: CD, LP	99	9
2008	Fasciinatiion: Released: August 5, 2008; Label: blank.wav (.WAV 01); Format: CD, 2-LP	46	6
2014	Doom Abuse: Released: April 8, 2014; Label: SQE Music (SQE 145-S); Format: CD, 2-LP	199	30
2019	Egowerk: Released: March 15, 2019; Label: Saddle Creek (LBJ-279); Format: CD, LP	—	26

==== Remix albums ====
Year	Album details
2000	Blank-Wave Arcade Remixes: Released: May 29, 2000; Labels: Saddle Creek (lbj-33), Blood Of The Young Records – (young-015); Format: LP
2003	Danse Macabre Remixes: Released: April 1, 2003; Labels: Astralwerks (ASW 83269-2); Format: CD, 3-LP

==== Compilation albums ====
Year	Album details
2016	CAPSULE:1999-2016: Released: September 30, 2016; Label: Saddle Creek (LBJ-245); Format: CD, 2-LP/7"

=== EPs ===
Year	Album details
2001	Mote/Dust: Released: 2001; Label: Gold Standard Laboratories (GSL47); Format: 12-inch
2012	Evil Voices: Released: November 2012; Label: Self-Released; Format: 12-inch; Note: Sold on tour, also available in the deluxe vinyl edition of Doom Abuse
2019	This Never Happened: Released: 2019; Label: Self-Released; Format: CD; Note: Sold during the 2019 tour

=== Singles ===
==== Retail singles ====
Year	Single	Label	Album
2002	"Agenda Suicide"	City Slang (20220-2)	Danse Macabre
2003	"The Conductor"	City Slang (20216-2)	Danse Macabre
2003	"Agenda Suicide" (remixes)	Astralwerks (7243 547106 6 7)	Danse Macabre Remixes
2004	"I Disappear"	Saddle Creek (LBJ-66)	Wet from Birth
2004	"Desperate Guys"	Saddle Creek (LBJ-83)	Wet from Birth
2008	"The Geeks Were Right"	Boysnoize (BNR 026)	Fasciinatiion
2009	"Mirror Error"	Boysnoize (BNR 033)	Fasciinatiion

==== Promotional singles ====
Year	Single	Label	Album
1997	Norman Bailer ("Some Incriminating Photographs"/"Typing: 1974-2048")	Saddle Creek	Media
2004	"Southern Belles In London Sing"	Saddle Creek	Wet From Birth

=== Splits ===
- Music Me All Over (split 7-inch) (as Norman Bailer) (Rolling Hill Records and Lumberjack)
- The Faint/Ex-Action Figures (split 7-inch) (1999, Saddle Creek)

=== Remixes ===
- Radio 4 - Dance to the Underground (2002 · City Slang)
- Joy Electric - We Are Rock (2002 · BEC Recordings)
- Yeah Yeah Yeahs - Y Control (2004 · Interscope Records / Polydor Records)
- Nine Inch Nails - Meet Your Master (2007)

=== Compilation appearances ===
- Nothing Left Fanzine No. 8 CD Sampler (1998)
  - Song: "Acting: On Campus Television"
- Messages: Modern Synthpop Artists Cover OMD (2001 · Ninthwave)
  - Song: "Enola Gay" (OMD cover)
- Saddle Creek 50 (2002 · Saddle Creek)
  - Songs: "Worked Up So Sexual", "Take Me to the Hospital"
- Liberation: Songs to Benefit PETA (2003 · Fat Wreck Chords)
  - Song: "Agenda Suicide"
- Lagniappe: A Saddle Creek Benefit for Hurricane Katrina (2005 · Saddle Creek)
  - Song: "Hypnotised"
- Injustice: Gods Among Us Soundtrack (2013 · WaterTower Music)
  - Song: "This Is Is Is Is Pain"

== Other projects ==
=== Vverevvolf Grehv ===
Vverevvolf Grehv
- Origin: Omaha, Nebraska
- Genres: Death metal; speed metal; IDM; noise
- Years active: 2007–present
- Label: Relapse Records
- Members: Dapose

Vverevvolf Grehv (pronounced as Werewolf Grave) is the brainchild of Dapose. The music of Vverevvolf Grehv combines the brutality of death metal, the tempos of speed metal and the sonic decimation of noise with the complexities of electronic music genres such as snare rush and IDM. He is influenced by Merzbow’s work, the writings of Howard Bloom, and numerous classical composers.

Albums

- Zombie Aesthetics - Relapse Records 2008

=== Broken Spindles ===
Broken Spindles
- Origin: Omaha, Nebraska
- Years active: 2001–2011
- Label: Saddle Creek
- Past members: Joel Petersen

Broken Spindles was a band solely consisting of Joel Petersen of Omaha, Nebraska, who also played bass, guitar and keyboards in The Faint. Their music ranged from instrumental electronic songs to sparse piano pieces to rock-influenced pop songs. Broken Spindles originally started in 2001 as the soundtrack for a friend's film.

== See also ==
- Broken Spindles
