= Violin Concerto No. 2 (Paganini) =

1826 music composition

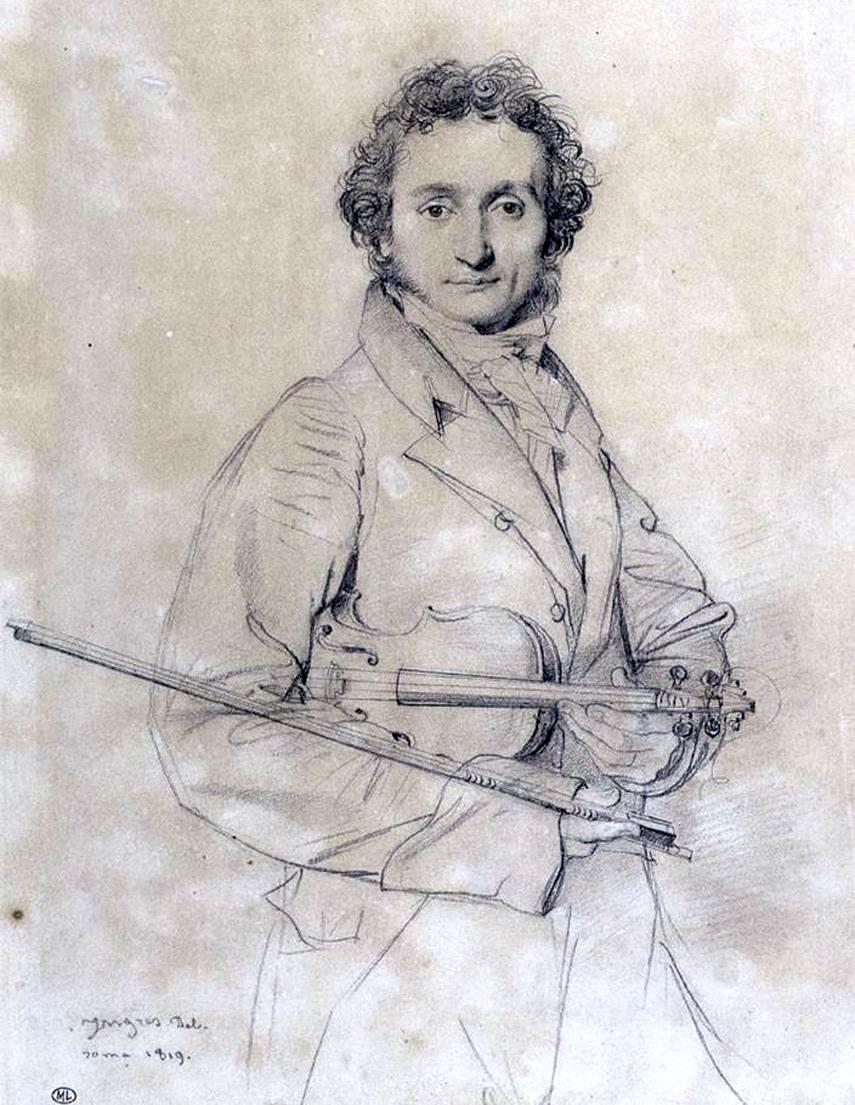
Niccolò Paganini, 1819

The Violin Concerto No. 2 in B minor, Op. 7, was composed by Niccolò Paganini in Italy in 1826. The third movement owes its nickname "La Campanella" or "La Clochette" to the little bell which Paganini uses to presage each recurrence of the rondo theme. The bell motif is also imitated in the orchestra and in some of the soloist's passages featuring string harmonics. The outcome is a very transparent texture, with the rondo theme having hints of musical qualities associated with Romani music.

== Structure ==
The concerto is in three movements:

1. Allegro maestoso (in B minor, ending in B major)
2. Adagio (in D major)
3. Rondo à la clochette (in B minor)

In addition to the solo violin, the work is scored for 2 flutes, 2 oboes, 2 clarinets in C, 2 bassoons, 2 horns in D, 2 trumpets in E, 3 trombones, serpentone (now usually performed on tuba), timpani, bass drum, bell in F#, and strings.

== Derivative works ==
The third movement has served as the basis of compositions by other composers, such as the Étude S. 140 No. 3 "La campanella" transcribed by Franz Liszt in the key of G# minor and Strauss I's Walzer à la Paganini Op. 11.

In September 2022, the "La Campanella" theme was sampled as part of the instrumental for the song "Shut Down" by South Korean girl group Blackpink. The song is in the key of B-flat minor.
