= Fasciinatiion =

Studio album by The Faint
- Released: August 5, 2008
- Genres: Indie rock; new wave; dance-punk
- Length: 35:02
- Label: blank.wav
- Producer: The Faint

The Faint chronology
Wet from Birth (2004)	Fasciinatiion (2008)	Doom Abuse (2014)

Professional ratings
Aggregate scores
Source	Rating
Metacritic	61/100 link
Review scores
Source	Rating
Allmusic	link
Alternative Press	2.5/5 stars
Billboard	(neutral) link
Paste	link
Pitchfork Media	(6.0/10) link

Fasciinatiion is the fifth studio album by American dance-punk band The Faint, released in the United States on August 5, 2008 through the group's independent label blank.wav. The project followed the band's departure from Saddle Creek Records and marked their first album to be written, recorded, produced, art directed, and released entirely in-house. Developed at the band's Enamel complex, the songs emphasize "a collaborative production process" and lyrics that wrestle with "futurist and existential questions." The release was promoted by the single "The Geeks Were Right," which reached digital platforms in June 2008 and typified the album's forward-looking themes.

The album is their first full-length release outside of Saddle Creek and on the new label blank.wav. Working out of the newly constructed Enamel studio complex, the group handled engineering with bassist Joel Petersen acting as chief engineer and framed the album around future-facing narratives about technology, belief, and childhood agency. Vocalist Todd Fink described the set as the band's most unfiltered representation to date, while Petersen highlighted the emotional intensity of the closing track "A Battle Hymn for Children."

"The Geeks Were Right" is the first single from the album and was officially released on iTunes at the end of June 2008.

The album was released in Australia through Inertia Music on September 20, 2008.

== Track listing ==
No.	Title	Length
1.	"Get Seduced"	4:23
2.	"The Geeks Were Right"	2:56
3.	"Machine in the Ghost"	3:20
4.	"Fulcrum and Lever"	3:22
5.	"Psycho"	2:51
6.	"Mirror Error"	3:43
7.	"I Treat You Wrong"	3:20
8.	"Forever Growing Centipedes"	3:54
9.	"Fish in a Womb"	3:16
10.	"A Battle Hymn for Children"	3:58
11.	"The Geeks Were Right (Does It Offend You, Yeah? remix) (Mexico Bonus Track)"	2:55
12.	"The Geeks Were Right (Boyz Noise vs. DIM remix) (Mexico Bonus Track)"	5:40
13.	"The Geeks Were Right (Toy Selectah remix) (Mexico Bonus Track)"	4:39
14.	"Mirror Error (Das Glow remix) (Mexico Bonus Track)"	5:50
15.	"Mirror Error (Kinky remix) (Mexico Bonus Track)"	4:14

== Personnel ==
- Todd Fink — vocals, keyboards
- Jacob Thiele — keyboards, backing vocals
- Dapose (Michael Dappen) — guitars
- Joel Petersen — bass
- Clark Baechle — drums, percussion
