= Medicine (band) =

American rock band

- Origin: Los Angeles, California, U.S.
- Genres: Alternative rock, shoegaze, noise pop, dream pop
- Years active: 1990–1995, 2003, 2013–present
- Labels: Creation, American, Wall of Sound, Captured Tracks, Drawing Room Records, Laner Archival Service
- Spinoffs: Maids of Gravity
- Members: Brad Laner; Jim Goodall; Julia Monreal
- Past members: Annette Zilinskas; Jim Putnam; Eddie Ruscha; Beth Thompson; Matt Devine; He Goak; Justin Meldal-Johnsen; Bernard Yin; Dean Opseth; Shannon Lee; Dale Jennings; Marianne Grubbs

Medicine are an American rock band formed in Los Angeles in 1990 by guitarist/keyboardist Brad Laner.

Their music is influenced by noise pop and shoegazing, blending conventional pop songwriting with drones and other avant-garde sounds, with layered guitars and dual male-female vocals on many songs. Medicine are perhaps best known for their cameo appearance in the 1994 film The Crow, in which they performed "Time Baby II", although the soundtrack included a different version titled "Time Baby III" (featuring guest vocals from the Cocteau Twins' Elizabeth Fraser).

== History ==
Medicine was formed by Brad Laner, shortly after his stint as a drummer with experimental band Savage Republic. He worked on some home demo recordings and after playing the tapes for music industry representatives, he was offered a contract if he organized a band to sound like the demos. Laner then assembled a band of musicians from the Los Angeles music scene. Medicine's early lineup included Laner on guitars and vocals, drummer Jim Goodall (Severed Head in a Bag, Jon Wayne, Lopez Beatles, Flying Burrito Brothers), guitarist Jim Putnam, bassist Eddie Ruscha and singer Annette Zilinskas (an original member of the Bangles). Zilinskas left before any official releases and was replaced by vocalist Beth Thompson (of Fourwaycross). On the basis of the original demo, the band was signed to Creation Records, becoming the first American band on the label. In America, Medicine signed to Rick Rubin's American Recordings label in 1992. With a signature guitar tone, created by running Laner's guitar through a Yamaha 4-track recorder, Medicine's music managed to distinguish itself from some of the more ambiguous endeavors of the shoegaze movement.

Their first album, Shot Forth Self Living, was released in 1992. It received airplay on college radio and coverage in alternative newspapers, with even a few of their videos played on MTV.

Their second album, The Buried Life, was released the following year, and gained Medicine more mainstream attention, including coverage in magazines like Creem.

In 1993, founding members Ruscha and Putnam formed another band called Maids of Gravity.

For their third album, Her Highness (1995), Matt Devine and Justin Meldal-Johnsen replaced Putnam and Ruscha, respectively. The band broke up soon after, and Laner formed supergroup Lusk.

Medicine reformed briefly in 2003, solely as a duo including Laner and Shannon Lee, the daughter of Bruce Lee. They released one album, The Mechanical Forces of Love.

The band's core lineup of Laner, Thompson and Goodall later reformed again and signed with the Captured Tracks label. Medicine released a new studio album, To the Happy Few, in July 2013, preceded by the single "Long as the Sun". On October 27, 2014, they released their sixth studio album, Home Everywhere.

Medicine's 2019 album Scarred for Life featured Laner, Goodall, Zilinskas, and Devine.

== Style and legacy ==
Medicine have been described as a noise pop and dream pop band. According to Steve Huey of AllMusic, the band "went further than most with their fusion of gorgeous melody and tonal fuzz," describing the sound as a "melodic, rhythmic style of noise rock."

Pitchfork has hailed Medicine as the closest thing to being an American answer to My Bloody Valentine.

In 2012, Captured Tracks reissued Medicine's first two albums, 1992's Shot Forth Self Living and 1993's The Buried Life, with bonus material and rarities, as part of their Shoegaze Archive series.

== Discography ==
=== Studio albums ===
- Shot Forth Self Living (Def American/Creation, 1992)
- The Buried Life (American, 1993)
- Her Highness (American, 1995)
- The Mechanical Forces of Love (Wall of Sound/Astralwerks, 2003)
- To the Happy Few (Captured Tracks, 2013)
- Home Everywhere (Captured Tracks, 2014)
- Scarred For Life (Drawing Room Records, 2019)
- Drugs (MPLS Ltd, 2022)

=== Laner Archival Service ===
Releases primarily distributed through Bandcamp:

- Her Highness (Premiere Melange) (Laner Archival Service 2023)
- Silences (Laner Archival Service 2023)
- On The Bed (Laner Archival Service 2024)
- Medicine (Laner Archival Service 2024)
- We'll Run Away (Laner Archival Service 2025)

=== Singles and EPs ===
- "Aruca" (1992, Creation)
- "5ive" (1993, Creation)
- "Never Click" (1993, Beggars Banquet)
- Sounds of Medicine EP (1994, American)
- "Time Baby 3" (1994, American) UK No. 109
- "Candy Candy" (1995, American)
- "Off the Vine" double 7" (1995, Ectoplasm)
- Wet on Wet EP (2002, Wall of Sound)
- "I Smile to My Eyes" (2003, Wall of Sound)
- "As You Do" (2004, Wall of Sound)
- "Time Baby 2" (2011, Captured Tracks)
- "Long as the Sun" (2013, Captured Tracks)

=== Live albums ===
- Always Starting to Stop (2012, Captured Tracks)
- In Session (2013, Captured Tracks)

=== Compilation albums ===
- Remains 1992-1995 (2011, self-released)
- Box Set (2012, Captured Tracks)
- 2.0 Extraneous (2017, Drawing Room Records)
- Falls (2019, Brava Entertainment)

=== Compilation appearances ===
- "Miss Drugstore" on Creation: Indie-Pop's Been Good to Us (1992, Indiecator)
- "Never Click" on Particle Theory (1993, Warner Bros.)
- "Time Baby III" on The Crow (Original Motion Picture Soundtrack) (1994, Atlantic)
- "Slut" on The Doom Generation - Music from the Motion Picture (1995, American)
- "One More Night" on Tigerbeat6 Inc. (2001, Tigerbeat6)
- "I Smile to My Eyes" on Labels Series (2003, Labels)
- "As You Do" and "I Smile to My Eyes (Themroc Mix)" on Off The Wall - 10 Years of Wall Of Sound (2003, Wall of Sound)
- "Live It Down" on Musique Dessinee 01 - Just a Groove! (2006, Production Dessinée)
