= Cursive discography =

- Studio albums: 9
- Extended plays: 6
- Compilation albums: 1
- Singles: 8
- Music videos: 11
- Other appearances: 4

The discography of Cursive, an American indie rock band, consists of seven studio albums, one compilation album, six EPs, eight singles, and eleven music videos.

== Studio albums ==
List of studio albums, with selected chart positions
Title	Album details	Peak chart positions			
Title	Album details	US	US Alt	US Indie	US Rock
Such Blinding Stars for Starving Eyes	Released: September 9, 1997; Label: Crank!; Format: CD, LP	—	—	—	—
The Storms of Early Summer: Semantics of Song	Released: November 2, 1998; Label: Saddle Creek; Format: CD, LP	—	—	—	—
Domestica	Released: June 20, 2000; Label: Saddle Creek; Format: CD, LP	—	—	—	—
The Ugly Organ	Released: March 4, 2003; Label: Saddle Creek; Format: CD, LP	— (Note: The Ugly Organ did not enter the US Billboard 200, but peaked at number 19 on the US Heatseekers Albums Chart.)	—	9	—
Happy Hollow	Released: August 22, 2006; Label: Saddle Creek; Format: CD, LP	96	—	8	—
Mama, I'm Swollen	Released: March 10, 2009; Label: Saddle Creek; Format: CD, LP	104	—	11	—
I Am Gemini	Released: February 21, 2012; Label: Saddle Creek; Format: CD, LP	127	21	17	30
Vitriola	Released: October 5, 2018; Label: 15 Passenger; Format: CD, LP	— (Note: Vitriola did not enter the US Billboard 200, but peaked at number 86 on the Current Album Sales Chart.)	— (Note: Vitriola did not enter the Alternative Albums chart, but peaked at number 14 on the Alternative Album Sales chart.)	21	— (Note: Vitriola did not enter the Top Rock Albums chart, but peaked at number 31 on the Rock Album Sales chart.)
Get Fixed	Released: October 11, 2019; Label: 15 Passenger; Format: CD, LP	—	—	—	—
Devourer	Released: September 13, 2024; Label: Run for Cover; Format: CD, LP	—	—	—	—
"—" denotes releases that did not chart.

== Compilation albums ==
List of compilation albums, with selected chart positions
Title	Album details	Peak chart positions	
Title	Album details	US	US Indie
The Difference Between Houses and Homes	Released: August 9, 2005; Label: Saddle Creek; Format: CD, LP	— (Note: The Difference Between Houses and Homes did not enter the US Billboard 200, but peaked at number 21 on the US Heatseekers Albums Chart.)	37
"—" denotes releases that did not chart.

== EPs ==
Year	Album details
1996	The Disruption: Released: November 30, 1996; Label: Lumberjack; Format: EP
1998	The Icebreaker 7": Released: 1998; Label: Saddle Creek; Format: EP
1999	Silver Scooter / Cursive: Released: May 4, 1999; Label: Crank!; Format: EP, CD
2001	Burst and Bloom: Released: July 23, 2001; Label: Saddle Creek; Format: EP, CD
2002	8 Teeth to Eat You: Released: June 4, 2002; Label: Better Looking / Five One; Format: CD
2009	Cursive / Ladyfinger (ne): Released: April 18, 2009; Label: Saddle Creek; Format: EP
2012	The Sun and Moon: Released: February 21, 2012; Label: Saddle Creek; Format: Digital

== Singles ==
Year	Single	Album
1997	"Sucker and Dry"	n/a
2001	Small Brown Bike / Cursive	n/a
2003	"Art Is Hard"	The Ugly Organ
2004	"The Recluse"	The Ugly Organ
2006	"Dorothy at Forty"	Happy Hollow
2007	"Bad Sects"	Happy Hollow
2007	"Big Bang"	Happy Hollow
2010	"Discovering America"	n/a
"n/a" denotes singles that are not from albums.

== Music videos ==
Year	Song	Director	Album
2003	"Bloody Murderer"	Todd G. Bieber	The Ugly Organ
2003	"Some Red Handed Sleight of Hand"	Jun Kawaguchi	The Ugly Organ
2003	"Art Is Hard"	Travis John Dopp	The Ugly Organ
2004	"The Recluse"	Mike Malone	The Ugly Organ
2005	"A Disruption in the Normal Swing of Things"	Rob Walters	The Difference Between Houses and Homes
2006	"Dorothy at Forty"	Michael Grodner	Happy Hollow
2007	"Big Bang"	David Johnson	Happy Hollow
2007	"Bad Sects"	Nik Fackler	Happy Hollow
2009	"From the Hips"	Michael Grodner	Mama, I'm Swollen
2009	"I Couldn't Love You"		Mama, I'm Swollen
2009	"Let Me Up"	Evan Glodell	Mama, I'm Swollen

== Other appearances ==
The following Cursive songs were released on compilation and tribute albums. This is not an exhaustive list; songs that were first released on the band's albums, EPs, or singles are not included.

Year	Release details	Track(s)
1999	Linoma II: Riot on the Plains: Released: 1999; Label: -ismist Recordings; Format: CD	"Pivotal" (demo)
2003	Saddle Creek 50: Released: April 8, 2003; Label: Saddle Creek; Format: CD, LP	"Nonsense"
2004	How Soon Is Now?: Released: October 26, 2004; Label: Sorepoint; Format: CD	"Frankly, Mr. Shankly" (originally performed by The Smiths)
2005	Lagniappe: Released: October 25, 2005; Label: Saddle Creek; Format: CD	"Ten Percent to the Ten Percent"
