= A.V. Undercover =

American live music web series

- Genre: Live music
- Created by: The A.V. Club
- Country of origin: United States
- Original language: English
- No. of seasons: 9
- No. of episodes: 311

Production
- Running time: 2–10 minutes

Original release
- Release: March 9, 2010 – present

A.V. Undercover is an American live music web series created by The A.V. Club, distributed on their website. The series premiered on March 16, 2010, going into an extended hiatus after the 8th season in 2017. It was revived for a 9th season in June 2024.

For each season, a list of 25 songs is compiled. Bands are then invited to choose a song to cover. Once a song has been played, it gets crossed off the list. The later a band comes on, the fewer songs they have to choose from. In the first season, The A.V. Club staff picked the songs. In the remaining seasons, readers of The A.V. Club voted for them. At the end of a season, there was an online vote for the favorite video.

In between season, there were mini seasons of Holiday Undercover (where each artist chose a song with a holiday theme) and Summer Break, where artists covered "songs having to do with summer".

In 2010, NPR selected "Wye Oak Covers the Kinks" as one of "Five Great Cover Songs from 2010 (So Far)". It was a 2011 Honoree for a Webby.

All episodes have since been deleted from YouTube, with the exception of Season 2, Episode 18, in which They Might Be Giants sang Tubthumping, which is hosted on They Might Be Giants' YouTube channel.

The song that plays during the introduction is "Someone Has to Die" by Maritime.

== Episodes ==
Season	Episodes	Originally released	
Season	Episodes	First released	Last released
1	28	March 9, 2010	November 17, 2010
2	11	November 30, 2010	December 30, 2010
3	28	March 15, 2011	September 14, 2011
4	7	July 12, 2011	July 12, 2011
5	10	November 21, 2011	December 21, 2011
6	28	March 13, 2012	October 9, 2012
7	7	July 31, 2012	August 16, 2012
8	28	March 19, 2013	October 22, 2013
9	11	July 9, 2013	August 9, 2013
10	4	December 3, 2013	December 23, 2013
11	32	May 8, 2014	December 4, 2014
12	4	December 9, 2014	December 30, 2014
13	33	April 28, 2015	November 25, 2015
14	4	December 1, 2015	December 22, 2015
15	36	February 11, 2016	December 5, 2016
16	5	October 17, 2016	November 2, 2016
17	3	December 6, 2016	December 20, 2016
18	4	May 2, 2017	May 11, 2017
19	26	May 15, 2017	November 7, 2017
20	10	July 17, 2024	December 24, 2024
21	TBA	December 18, 2025	TBA

=== Season 1 (2010) ===
No. overall	No. in season	Title	Band	Song	Performers	Release date
1	1	"Introduction to A.V. Undercover"	TBA	TBA	TBA	March 9, 2010
2	2	"Ted Leo and the Pharmacists cover Tears for Fears"	Ted Leo and the Pharmacists	"Everybody Wants to Rule the World" by Tears for Fears	James Canty, Marty Key, Ted Leo, Chris Wilson	March 16, 2010
3	3	"Fruit Bats cover Hall & Oates"	Fruit Bats	"One on One" by Hall & Oates	Graeme Gibson, Eric D. Johnson, Ron Lewis, Chris Sherman, Sam Wagster	March 23, 2010
4	4	"Alkaline Trio covers Archers of Loaf"	Alkaline Trio	"Web in Front" by Archers of Loaf	Dan Andriano, Matt Skiba	March 30, 2010
5	5	"Cursive covers Starship"	Cursive	"We Built This City" by Starship	Tim Kasher, Matt Maginn, Patrick Newbery, Cully Symington	April 6, 2010
6	6	"Justin Townes Earle covers Bruce Springsteen"	Justin Townes Earle	"Atlantic City" by Bruce Springsteen	Justin Townes Earle	April 13, 2010
7	7	"Retribution Gospel Choir covers the Beach Boys"	Retribution Gospel Choir	"Kokomo" by the Beach Boys	Steve Garrington, Eric Pollard, Alan Sparhawk	April 20, 2010
8	8	"Maritime covers Depeche Mode"	Maritime	"Enjoy the Silence" by Depeche Mode	Davey von Bohlen, Dan Didier, Dan Hinz, Justin Klug	April 27, 2010
9	9	"The Clientele covers M.I.A."	The Clientele	"Paper Planes" by M.I.A.	Mel Draisey, James Hornsey, Mark Keen, Alasdair MacLean, feat. Kristina Feldmann, Heather McIntosh	May 4, 2010
10	10	"Ben Folds cover Elliott Smith"	Ben Folds	"Say Yes" by Elliott Smith	Ben Folds	May 11, 2010
11	11	"Wye Oak cover the Kinks"	Wye Oak	"Strangers" by the Kinks	Andy Stack, Jenn Wasner, feat. Jonathan Meiburg	May 18, 2010
12	12	"Motion City Soundtrack covers Pavement"	Motion City Soundtrack	"Cut Your Hair" by Pavement	Joshua Cain, Jesse Johnson, Justin Pierre, Matthew Taylor, Tony Thaxton	May 25, 2010
13	13	"the Wedding Present covers the Rolling Stones"	the Wedding Present	"19th Nervous Breakdown" by the Rolling Stones	Terry de Castro, David Gedge, Charlie Layton, Graeme Ramsey	June 1, 2010
14	14	"Owen Pallett covers Guided by Voices"	Owen Pallett	"Game of Pricks" by Guided by Voices	Owen Pallett	June 8, 2010
15	15	"The Antlers cover Pink Floyd"	The Antlers	"Wish You Were Here" by Pink Floyd	Darby Cicci, Michael Lerner, Peter Silberman	June 15, 2010
16	16	"Rise Against covers Nirvana"	Rise Against	"Sliver" by Nirvana	Brandon Barnes, Zach Blair, Tim McIlrath, Joe Principe	June 22, 2010
17	17	"Frightened Rabbit covers the Lemonheads"	Frightened Rabbit	"Confetti" by the Lemonheads	Scott Hutchison	June 29, 2010
18	18	"Clem Snide covers Journey"	Clem Snide	"Faithfully" by Journey	Eef Barzelay, Brendan Fitzpatrick, Ben Martin	July 6, 2010
19	19	"Coheed And Cambria covers the Smiths"	Coheed And Cambria	"A Rush and a Push and the Land Is Ours" by the Smiths	Claudio Sanchez, Travis Stever	July 13, 2010
20	20	"Patrick Stump covers the Wedding Present"	Patrick Stump	"My Favorite Dress" by the Wedding Present	Patrick Stump	July 20, 2010
21	21	"Superchunk covers the Cure"	Superchunk	"In Between Days" by the Cure	Laura Ballance, Mac McCaughan, Jim Wilbur, Jon Wurster	July 27, 2010
22	22	"Mates Of State cover the Replacements"	Mates Of State	"I Will Dare" by the Replacements	Kori Gardner, Jason Hammel, feat. Todd Barry, John Panos, Kenji Shinawaga	August 3, 2010
23	23	"The Swell Season covers Neutral Milk Hotel"	The Swell Season	"Two-Headed Boy" by Neutral Milk Hotel	Rob Bochnik, Joseph Doyle, Glen Hansard, Graham Hopkins, Marketa Irglova	August 10, 2010
24	24	"Cymbals Eat Guitars cover Superchunk"	Cymbals Eat Guitars	"Detroit has a Skyline" by Superchunk	Joseph D'Agostino, Brian Hamilton, Matthew Miller, Matt Whipple	August 17, 2010
25	25	"Tokyo Police Club covers Billy Squier"	Tokyo Police Club	"Everybody Wants You" by Billy Squier	Greg Alsop, Josh Hook, David Monks, Graham Wright	August 24, 2010
26	26	"The Walkmen cover R.E.M."	The Walkmen	"Driver 8" by R.E.M.	Matt Barrick, Peter Bauer, Hamilton Leithauser, Paul Maroon, Walter Martin	August 31, 2010
27	27	"Vote and watch the re-cap"	TBA	"	TBA	August 31, 2010
28	28	"Headlights covers XTC"	Headlights	"Making Plans for Nigel" by XTC	Erin Fein, Brett Sanderson, Tristan Wraight, Nick Sanborn	November 17, 2010

=== Holiday Undercover (2010) ===
No. overall	No. in season	Title	Band	Song	Performers	Release date
29	1	"The Walkmen cover Holiday Road"	The Walkmen	"Holiday Road" by Lindsey Buckingham	TBA	November 30, 2010
30	2	"Brendan Benson covers Merry Xmas Everybody"	Brendan Benson	"Merry Xmas Everybody" by Slade	TBA	December 2, 2010
31	3	"Kate Nash covers Merry Xmas Everybody"	Kate Nash	"Merry Xmas Everybody" by Slade	TBA	December 7, 2010
32	4	"Andrew W.K. covers 'Silent Night'"	Andrew W.K.	"Silent Night"	TBA	December 8, 2010
33	5	"Andrew W.K. ft. Rodney the Mailman covers 'Silent Night'"	Andrew W.K.	"Silent Night"	TBA	December 8, 2010
34	6	"Shearwater covers Randy Newman"	Shearwater	"God's Song (That's Why I Love Mankind)" by Randy Newman	TBA	December 13, 2010
35	7	"Dresden Dolls cover Neutral Milk Hotel"	Dresden Dolls	"Two Headed Boy" by Neutral Milk Hotel	TBA	December 15, 2010
36	8	"Fran Healy covers Joni Mitchell"	Fran Healy	"River" by Joni Mitchell	TBA	December 21, 2010
37	9	"The Music Tapes covers Let It Snow/Zat You, Santa Claus?"	The Music Tapes	"Let It Snow! Let It Snow! Let It Snow!"/"Zat You, Santa Claus?" by Vaughn Monroe/Louis Armstrong	TBA	December 23, 2010
38	10	"Vetiver covers Ramones"	Vetiver	"Merry Christmas (I Don't Want to Fight Tonight)" by Ramones	TBA	December 28, 2010
39	11	"Badly Drawn Boy covers Do They Know It's Christmas?"	Badly Drawn Boy	"Do They Know It's Christmas?" by Band Aid	TBA	December 30, 2010

=== Season 2 (2011) ===
No. overall	No. in season	Title	Band	Song	Performers	Release date
40	1	"Iron and Wine covers George Michael"	Iron and Wine	"One More Try" by George Michael	Sam Beam, Jim Becker, Stuart Bogie, Marketa Irglova, Nick Luca, Rosie Thomas	March 15, 2011
41	2	"Baths cover LCD Soundsystem"	Baths	"All My Friends" by LCD Soundsystem	Will Wiesenfeld, feat. Dexter Tortoriello	March 22, 2011
42	3	"Dum Dum Girls cover Big Star"	Dum Dum Girls	"September Gurls" by Big Star	Bambi, Dee Dee, Jules, Sandy	March 29, 2011
43	4	"The Low Anthem covers Wilco"	The Low Anthem	"A Shot in the Arm" by Wilco	Jocie Adams, Mat Davidson, Ben Knox Miller, Jeff Prystowsky, Graham Smith	April 5, 2011
44	5	"Titus Andronicus covers They Might Be Giants"	Titus Andronicus	"Birdhouse in Your Soul" by They Might Be Giants	Eric Harm, Ian Graetzer, David Robbins, Patrick Stickles	April 12, 2011
45	6	"Wye Oak covers Danzig"	Wye Oak	"Mother" by Danzig	Andy Stack, Jenn Wasner, feat. Don "Danzig" Godwin	April 19, 2011
46	7	"Telekinesis covers Belle & Sebastian"	Telekinesis	"Like Dylan In The Movies" by Belle & Sebastian	Michael Benjamin Lerner, Cody Votolato	April 26, 2011
47	8	"Rocky Votolato and Matt Pond PA cover the Human League"	Rocky Votolato and Matt Pond PA	"Don't You Want Me" by the Human League	Rocky Votolato, Matt Pond	May 3, 2011
48	9	"Low covers Toto"	Low	"Africa" by Toto	Alan Sparhawk, Mimi Parker, Steve Garrington, Eric Pollard	May 10, 2011
49	10	"Smith Westerns cover Tom Petty & the Heartbreakers"	Smith Westerns	"American Girl" by Tom Petty & the Heartbreakers	Cullen Omori, Cameron Omori, Max Kakacek, Julien Ehrlich, Hal James	May 17, 2011
50	11	"Of Montreal covers the White Stripes"	Of Montreal	"Fell in Love With a Girl" by the White Stripes	Kevin Barnes, Clayton Rychik, Bryan Poole, Davey Pierce	May 24, 2011
51	12	"Sharon Van Etten covers Fine Young Cannibals"	Sharon Van Etten	"She Drives Me Crazy" by Fine Young Cannibals	Sharon Van Etten, Doug Keith, Ben Lord, Adam Luksetich, Laurel Sprengelmeyer, Ari Swan	May 31, 2011
52	13	"the Mountain Goats cover Jawbreaker"	the Mountain Goats	"Boxcar" by Jawbreaker	John Darnielle, Jon Wurster, Peter Hughes, Yuval Semo	June 7, 2011
53	14	"Parts & Labor covers Kanye West"	Parts & Labor	"Runaway" by Kanye West	B.J. Warshaw, Joe Wong, Tom Martin, Dan Friel	June 14, 2011
54	15	"Surfer Blood covers Pixies"	Surfer Blood	"Gigantic (song)" by Pixies	Kevin Williams, Thomas Fekete, JP Pitts, TJ Schwarz, Sarah Baldwin	June 21, 2011
55	16	"...And You Will Know Us by the Trail of Dead covers Indigo Girls"	...And You Will Know Us by the Trail of Dead	"Blood And Fire" by Indigo Girls	Conrad Keely, Autry Fulbright II, Jason Reece, Jamie Miller	June 23, 2011
56	17	"Sloan covers Gary Numan"	Sloan	"Cars" by Gary Numan	Andrew Scott, Gregory MacDonald, Jay Ferguson, Patrick Pentland, Chris Murphy	June 28, 2011
57	18	"They Might Be Giants covers Chumbawamba (voted favorite of 2011)"	They Might Be Giants	"Tubthumping" by Chumbawamba	John Flansburgh, John Linnell, Dan Miller, Marty Beller, Danny Weinkauf, The A.V. Club choir	July 5, 2011
65	19	"The Get Up Kids cover Blur"	The Get Up Kids	"Girls & Boys" by Blur	Jim Suptic, Rob Pope, Matt Pryor, Ryan Pope, Dustin Kinsey	July 19, 2011
66	20	"Matt Nathanson covers Prince"	Matt Nathanson	"Little Red Corvette" by Prince	Matt Nathanson, Aaron Tap	July 26, 2011
67	21	"Bob Mould covers Sugar"	Bob Mould	"If I Can't Change Your Mind" by Sugar	Bob Mould	August 2, 2011
68	22	"the Decemberists cover Sugar"	the Decemberists	"If I Can't Change Your Mind" by Sugar	Colin Meloy, John Moen, Sara Watkins, Nate Query, Chris Funk	August 9, 2011
69	23	"Against Me! covers the Clash"	Against Me!	"Janie Jones" by the Clash	Laura Jane Grace, Andrew Seward, Jay Weinberg, James Bowman	August 16, 2011
70	24	"Basia Bulat covers Ted Leo & The Pharmacists"	Basia Bulat	"Where Have All the Rude Boys Gone" by Ted Leo & The Pharmacists	Basia Bulat	August 23, 2011
71	25	"the Hold Steady covers Huey Lewis & The News"	the Hold Steady	"The Power Of Love" by Huey Lewis and The News	Craig Finn, Steve Selvidge, Bobby Drake, Galen Polivka, Tad Kubler	August 30, 2011
72	26	"Peter Bjorn and John cover Otis Redding"	Peter Bjorn and John	"Try A Little Tenderness" by Otis Redding	Peter Morén, Björn Yttling, John Eriksson	September 6, 2011
73	27	"Fruit Bats cover Loretta Lynn"	Fruit Bats	"The Other Woman" by Loretta Lynn	Eric D. Johnson, Bob Parins, Nathan Anderson,	September 13, 2011
74	28	"Undercover 2011: Watch the re-cap and vote"	TBA	"	TBA	September 14, 2011

=== Summer Break (2011) ===
No. overall	No. in season	Title	Band	Song	Performers	Release date
58	1	"Maps & Atlases cover 'Summer Breeze' by Seals & Croft"	Maps & Atlases	"Summer Breeze" by Seals & Croft	TBA	July 12, 2011
59	2	"Yellow Ostrich cover In the Summertime" by Mungo Jerry"	Yellow Ostrich	"In the Summertime" by Mungo Jerry	TBA	July 12, 2011
60	3	"Josh Caterer of Smoking Popes covers 'Ask' by the Smiths"	Josh Caterer	"Ask" by the Smiths	TBA	July 12, 2011
61	4	"Dale Earnhardt Jr. Jr. covers 'Summer Babe' by Pavement"	Dale Earnhardt Jr. Jr.	"Summer Babe" by Pavement	TBA	July 12, 2011
62	5	"Owen covers 'Summertime Rolls' by Jane's Addiction"	Owen	"Summertime Rolls" by Jane's Addiction	TBA	July 12, 2011
63	6	"Crooked Fingers cover 'Summertime' by George Gershwin"	Crooked Fingers	"Summertime" by George Gershwin	TBA	July 12, 2011
64	7	"Les Savy Fav cover 'School's Out' by Alice Cooper"	Les Savy Fav	"School's Out" by Alice Cooper	TBA	July 12, 2011

=== Holiday Undercover (2011) ===
No. overall	No. in season	Title	Band	Song	Performers	Release date
75	1	"Electric Six covers You're a Mean One, Mr. Grinch"	Electric Six	"You're a Mean One, Mr. Grinch" by Thurl Ravenscroft	TBA	November 21, 2011
76	2	"Mannequin Men cover 'Nuttin' for Christmas'"	Mannequin Men	"Nuttin' for Christmas" by Art Mooney	TBA	November 23, 2011
77	3	"Peter Wolf Crier cover 'Last Christmas'"	Peter Wolf Crier	"Last Christmas" by Wham!	TBA	November 28, 2011
78	4	"Dawes cover 'Christmas Time Is Here'"	Dawes	"Christmas Time Is Here" by Vince Guaraldi	TBA	November 30, 2011
79	5	"Little Scream covers 'Jesus' by the Velvet Underground"	Little Scream	"Jesus" by the Velvet Underground	TBA	December 5, 2011
80	6	"David Bazan covers 'Just Like Christmas' by Low"	David Bazan	"Just Like Christmas" by Low	TBA	December 7, 2011
81	7	"Little Red covers Christmas Lights"	Little Red	"Christmas Lights" by Neil Gray	TBA	December 12, 2011
82	8	"Office of Future Plans and Damon Locks cover Holiday in Cambodia"	Office of Future Plans and Damon Locks	"Holiday in Cambodia" by Dead Kennedys	TBA	December 14, 2011
83	9	"Wye Oak covers 'Christmas Will Be Just Another Lonely Day' by Brenda Lee"	Wye Oak	"Christmas Will Be Just Another Lonely Day" by Brenda Lee	TBA	December 19, 2011
84	10	"the Mountain Goats cover Have Yourself a Merry Little Christmas"	the Mountain Goats	"Have Yourself a Merry Little Christmas" by Judy Garland	TBA	December 21, 2011

=== Season 3 (2012) ===
No. overall	No. in season	Title	Band	Song	Performers	Release date
85	1	"Sharon Van Etten and Shearwater cover Stevie Nicks and Tom Petty"	Sharon Van Etten and Shearwater (As Shearon Von Ettenwater)	"Stop Draggin' My Heart Around" by Stevie Nicks and Tom Petty	Sharon Van Etten, Jonathan Meiburg, Christiaan Mader, Danny Reisch, Mitch Billeaud, Lucas Oswald	March 13, 2012
86	2	"Young the Giant covers R. Kelly"	Young the Giant	"Ignition (Remix)" by R. Kelly	Sameer Gadhia, Eric Cannata, Francois Comtois, Jacob Tilley, Payam Doostzadeh	March 20, 2012
87	3	"Memoryhouse covers the Police"	Memoryhouse	"Every Little Thing She Does Is Magic" by the Police	Denise Nouvion, Evan Abeele, Daniel Gray	March 27, 2012
88	4	"Punch Brothers cover the Cars"	Punch Brothers	"Just What I Needed" by the Cars	Chris Thile, Gabe Witcher, Noam Pickelny, Chris Eldridge, Paul Kowert	April 3, 2012
89	5	"The Head and the Heart covers Fleetwood Mac"	The Head and the Heart	"Go Your Own Way" by Fleetwood Mac	TBA	April 10, 2012
90	6	"Cursive and Cymbals Eat Guitars cover Gin Blossoms"	Cursive and Cymbals Eat Guitars (As Cursive Eats Guitars)	"Hey Jealousy" by Gin Blossoms	Brian Hamilton, Tim Kasher, Ted Stevens, Joseph D'Agostino, Matt Whipple, Matthew Miller	April 17, 2012
91	7	"Lucero covers David Bowie"	Lucero	"Modern Love" by David Bowie	Ben Nichols, Rick Steff, Todd Beene, Jim Spake, Roy Berry, Scott Thompson, John C. Stubblefield	April 24, 2012
92	8	"Trampled" by Turtles covers Arcade Fire"	Trampled by Turtles	"Rebellion (Lies)" by Arcade Fire	Dave Simonett, Dave Carroll, Erik Berry, Ryan Young, Tim Saxhaug	May 1, 2012
93	9	"Nada Surf covers New Order"	Nada Surf	"Bizarre Love Triangle" by New Order	Ryan Alfred, Ira Elliot, Matthew Caws, Doug Gillard, Martin Wenk, Daniel Lorca	May 8, 2012
94	10	"Screaming Females cover Sheryl Crow"	Screaming Females	"If It Makes You Happy" by Sheryl Crow	Marissa Paternoster, Jarrett Dougherty, King Mike	May 15, 2012
95	11	"Hospitality covers Steely Dan"	Hospitality	"Rikki Don't Lose That Number" by Steely Dan	Amber Papini, Nathan Michel, Brian Betancourt, David Christian	May 22, 2012
96	12	"Portland Cello Project and Alan Sparhawk of Low cover Suicidal Tendencies"	The Portland Cello Project and Alan Sparhawk	"Institutionalized" by Suicidal Tendencies	TBA	May 29, 2012
97	13	"Reggie Watts covers Van Halen"	Reggie Watts	"Panama" by Van Halen	TBA	June 5, 2012
98	14	"The Hood Internet covers the Pretenders"	The Hood Internet	"Back on the Chain Gang" by the Pretenders	TBA	June 13, 2012
99	15	"The Polyphonic Spree covers Neil Young"	The Polyphonic Spree	"Heart of Gold" by Neil Young	TBA	June 19, 2012
100	16	"Grouplove covers Andrew W.K."	Grouplove	"Party Hard" by Andrew W.K.	TBA	June 27, 2012
101	17	"Father John Misty covers the Flaming Lips"	Father John Misty	"Do You Realize??" by the Flaming Lips	TBA	July 3, 2012
102	18	"Mariachi El Bronx covers the Decemberists"	Mariachi El Bronx	"Los Angeles, I'm Yours" by the Decemberists	TBA	July 10, 2012
103	19	"Deer Tick covers Harvey Danger"	Deer Tick	"Flagpole Sitta" by Harvey Danger	TBA	July 17, 2012
104	20	"Ceremony covers Violent Femmes"	Ceremony	"Kiss Off" by Violent Femmes	TBA	July 23, 2012
113	21	"The Wood Brothers cover Michael Jackson"	The Wood Brothers	"P.Y.T. (Pretty Young Thing)" by Michael Jackson	TBA	August 21, 2012
114	22	"Liturgy covers Shellac"	Liturgy	"Prayer To God" by Shellac	TBA	August 28, 2012
115	23	"Jukebox the Ghost covers Lana Del Rey"	Jukebox the Ghost	"Blue Jeans" by Lana Del Rey	TBA	September 4, 2012
116	24	"Calexico covers Kenny Loggins"	Calexico	"Danger Zone" by Kenny Loggins	TBA	September 11, 2012
117	25	"The Promise Ring covers Adele"	The Promise Ring	"Rumour Has It" by Adele	TBA	September 18, 2012
118	26	"Field Report covers Sufjan Stevens"	Field Report	"Chicago" by Sufjan Stevens	TBA	September 25, 2012
119	27	"Gwar covers Kansas (voted favorite of 2012)"	Gwar	"Carry On Wayward Son" by Kansas	Oderus Urungus(Dave Brockie), Pustulus Maximus (Brent Purgason), Balsac the Jaws of Death (Mike Derks), Beefcake the Mighty (Jamison Land), Jizmak Da Gusha (Brad Roberts)	October 3, 2012
120	28	"A.V. Undercover 2012: Watch the recap and vote"	TBA	"	TBA	October 9, 2012

=== Summer Break (2012) ===
No. overall	No. in season	Title	Band	Song	Performers	Release date
105	1	"Glen Hansard, Lisa Hannigan & John Smith cover The Band"	Glen Hansard, Lisa Hannigan, John Smith	"The Night They Drove Old Dixie Down" by The Band	TBA	July 31, 2012
106	2	"The Spinto Band covers Chris Stamey"	The Spinto Band	"Summer Sun" by Chris Stamey	TBA	August 2, 2012
107	3	"Eef Barzelay & Chris Otepka cover Bryan Adams"	Eef Barzelay & Chris Otepka	"Summer Of '69" by Bryan Adams	TBA	August 6, 2012
108	4	"Chris Otepka & Eef Barzelay cover Roger Miller"	Chris Otepka & Eef Barzelay	"In the Summertime" by Roger Miller	TBA	August 7, 2012
109	5	"Destroyer cover Gorky's Zygotic Mynci"	Destroyer	"Face Like Summer" by Gorky's Zygotic Mynci	TBA	August 9, 2012
110	6	"Kelly Hogan covers the Hold Steady"	Kelly Hogan	"Constructive Summer" by the Hold Steady	TBA	August 13, 2012
111	7	"The Dandy Warhols cover Summertime Blues"	The Dandy Warhols	"Summertime Blues" by Eddie Cochran	TBA	August 14, 2012
112	8	"Scott Lucas & the Married Men cover Bananarama"	Scott Lucas and the Married Men	"Cruel Summer" by Bananarama	TBA	August 16, 2012

=== Season 4 (2013) ===
No. overall	No. in season	Title	Band	Song	Performers	Release date
121	1	"Yo La Tengo covers the Supremes"	Yo La Tengo	"Come See About Me" by the Supremes	TBA	March 19, 2013
122	2	"Frontier Ruckus covers Third Eye Blind"	Frontier Ruckus	"Semi-Charmed Life" by Third Eye Blind	TBA	March 26, 2013
123	3	"ZZ Ward covers Frank Ocean's Thinkin Bout You"	ZZ Ward	"Thinkin Bout You" by Frank Ocean	TBA	April 3, 2013
124	4	"Night Beds covers Robyn"	Night Beds	"Dancing On My Own" by Robyn	TBA	April 9, 2013
125	5	"Frightened Rabbit covers Cheap Trick"	Frightened Rabbit	"Surrender" by Cheap Trick	TBA	April 16, 2013
126	6	"Mac DeMarco covers Weezer"	Mac DeMarco	"The Sweater Song" by Weezer	TBA	April 23, 2013
127	7	"Houndmouth covers Billy Bragg & Wilco's 'Joe DiMaggio Done It Again'"	Houndmouth	"Joe DiMaggio Done It Again" by Billy Bragg and Wilco	TBA	April 30, 2013
128	8	"Basia Bulat covers Bruce Springsteen"	Basia Bulat	"Glory Days" by Bruce Springsteen	TBA	May 2, 2013
129	9	"Thao & The Get Down Stay Down covers INXS"	Thao & The Get Down Stay Down	"Need You Tonight" by INXS	TBA	May 7, 2013
130	10	"Blessed Feathers covers Paul Simon"	Blessed Feathers	"Me and Julio Down by the Schoolyard" by Paul Simon	TBA	May 16, 2013
131	11	"Coliseum covers Eddie Money"	Coliseum	"Shakin'" by Eddie Money	TBA	May 21, 2013
132	12	"Xenia Rubinos covers Talking Heads"	Xenia Rubinos	"Psycho Killer" by Talking Heads	TBA	May 28, 2013
133	13	"JC Brooks & the Uptown Sound covers Blackstreet"	JC Brooks & the Uptown Sound	"No Diggity" by Blackstreet	TBA	June 4, 2013
134	14	"Savoir Adore covers New Radicals"	Savoir Adore	"You Get What You Give" by the New Radicals	TBA	June 11, 2013
135	15	"Alpine covers Radiohead"	Alpine	"Just" by Radiohead	TBA	June 18, 2013
136	16	"Milo Greene covers Billy Joel"	Milo Greene	"We Didn't Start the Fire" by Billy Joel	TBA	June 25, 2013
137	17	"Manchester Orchestra covers Faces"	Manchester Orchestra	"Ooh La La" by Faces	TBA	July 2, 2013
149	18	"Charli XCX covers Backstreet Boys"	Charli XCX	"I Want It That Way" by Backstreet Boys	TBA	August 14, 2013
150	19	"Wang Chung covers Modest Mouse"	Wang Chung	"3rd Planet" by Modest Mouse	TBA	August 20, 2013
151	20	"Kurt Vile covers Nine Inch Nails"	Kurt Vile	"Down in It" by Nine Inch Nails	TBA	August 27, 2013
152	21	"Free Energy covers Sleater-Kinney"	Free Energy	"You're No Rock n' Roll Fun" by Sleater-Kinney	TBA	September 3, 2013
153	22	"Disappears covers U2"	Disappears	"New Year's Day" by U2	TBA	September 11, 2013
154	23	"Richard Marx and Matt Scannell cover Tom Jones"	Richard Marx, Matt Scannell	"What's New Pussycat?" by Tom Jones	TBA	September 17, 2013
155	24	"Mannequin Men covers Dinosaur Jr."	Mannequin Men	"Not You Again" by Dinosaur Jr.	TBA	September 24, 2013
156	25	"Gwar covers Billy Ocean (voted favorite of 2013)"	Gwar	"Get Outta My Dreams, Get into My Car" by Billy Ocean	TBA	October 2, 2013
157	26	"The Dismemberment Plan covers Heart"	The Dismemberment Plan	"Barracuda" by Heart	TBA	October 8, 2013
158	27	"Ben Sollee covers Rollins Band"	Ben Sollee	"Low Self Opinion" by Rollins Band	TBA	October 15, 2013
159	28	"A.V. Undercover 2013: Watch the recap and vote for your favorites"	TBA	"	TBA	October 22, 2013

=== Summer Break (2013) ===
No. overall	No. in season	Title	Band	Song	Performers	Release date
138	1	"Mac McCaughan and Kelly Hogan cover Jonathan Richman"	Mac McCaughan, Kelly Hogan	"That Summer Feeling" by Jonathan Richman	TBA	July 9, 2013
139	2	"Matmos covers Bow Wow Wow"	Matmos	"I Want Candy (Snowden)" by Bow Wow Wow	TBA	July 15, 2013
140	3	"Rick Springfield covers Fleetwood Mac"	Rick Springfield	"Oh Well" by Fleetwood Mac	TBA	July 16, 2013
141	4	"Telekinesis covers Donovan"	Telekinesis	"Sunshine Superman" by Donovan	TBA	July 19, 2013
142	5	"Ezra Furman covers Wilco"	Ezra Furman	"Heavy Metal Drummer" by Wilco	TBA	July 27, 2013
143	6	"Rogue Wave covers Duran Duran"	Rogue Wave	"Rio" by Duran Duran	TBA	July 26, 2013
144	7	"...And You Will Know Us by the Trail of Dead covers the Kinks"	...And You Will Know Us by the Trail of Dead	"Sunny Afternoon" by the Kinks	TBA	July 31, 2013
145	8	"Metz covers the Damned"	METZ	"Neat Neat Neat" by the Damned	TBA	August 2, 2013
146	9	"Mac McCaughan and Kelly Hogan cover Nick Gilder"	Mac McCaughan, Kelly Hogan	"Hot Child in the City" by Nick Gilder	TBA	August 5, 2013
147	10	"Ted Leo and the Pharmacists covers Ramones"	Ted Leo and the Pharmacists	"Go Lil' Camaro Go" by Ramones	TBA	August 6, 2013
148	11	"Melvins covers Butthole Surfers"	Melvins	"Graveyard" by Butthole Surfers	TBA	August 9, 2013

=== Holiday Undercover (2013) ===
No. overall	No. in season	Title	Band	Song	Performers	Release date
160	1	"Os Mutantes covers 'Happy Xmas (War Is Over)'"	Os Mutantes	"Happy Xmas (War Is Over)" by John Lennon	TBA	December 3, 2013
161	2	"Joseph Arthur covers 'Please, Daddy (Don't Get Drunk This Christmas)'"	Joseph Arthur	"Please, Daddy (Don't Get Drunk This Christmas)" by John Denver	TBA	December 10, 2013
162	3	"Mike Doughty covers 'Christmas in Hollis'"	Mike Doughty	"Christmas in Hollis" by Run-D.M.C.	TBA	December 17, 2013
163	4	"The World Is... covers 'What Child Is This?'"	The World Is a Beautiful Place & I Am No Longer Afraid to Die	"What Child Is This?	TBA	December 23, 2013

=== Season 5 (2014) ===
No. overall	No. in season	Title	Band	Song	Performers	Release date
164	1	"Wye Oak covers Kate Bush"	Wye Oak	"Running Up That Hill" by Kate Bush	TBA	May 8, 2014
165	2	"Wild Cub covers Beyoncé"	Wild Cub	"Crazy in Love" by Beyoncé	TBA	June 10, 2014
166	3	"Lydia Loveless covers Echo and the Bunnymen"	Lydia Loveless	"The Killing Moon" by Echo and the Bunnymen	TBA	June 17, 2014
167	4	"The Men cover Devo"	The Men	"Gates of Steel" by Devo	TBA	June 24, 2014
168	5	"Howler covers 38 Special"	Howler	"Hold On Loosely" by 38 Special	TBA	July 1, 2014
169	6	"PUP covers Buzzcocks"	PUP	"Ever Fallen In Love" by Buzzcocks	TBA	July 8, 2014
170	7	"Eagulls covers the Stone Roses"	Eagulls	"I Wanna Be Adored" by the Stone Roses	TBA	July 15, 2014
171	8	"The Coathangers covers Go-Go's"	The Coathangers	"We Got the Beat" by the Go-Go's	TBA	July 22, 2014
172	9	"Tokyo Police Club covers Wheatus"	Tokyo Police Club	"Teenage Dirtbag" by Wheatus	TBA	July 29, 2014
173	10	"Andrew Jackson Jihad covers Stone Temple Pilots"	Andrew Jackson Jihad	"Plush" by Stone Temple Pilots	TBA	July 31, 2014
174	11	"Cheatahs covers Big Country"	Cheatahs	"In a Big Country" by Big Country	TBA	August 5, 2014
175	12	"Hamilton Leithauser covers John Mellencamp"	Hamilton Leithauser	"I Need a Lover" by John Mellencamp	TBA	August 12, 2014
176	13	"Real Estate covers the Cranberries"	Real Estate	"Linger" by the Cranberries	TBA	August 19, 2014
177	14	"Ben Watt and Bernard Butler cover Wang Chung"	Ben Watt, Bernard Butler	"Dance Hall Days" by Wang Chung	TBA	August 26, 2014
178	15	"Courtney Barnett covers the Breeders"	Courtney Barnett	"Cannonball" by the Breeders	TBA	September 2, 2014
179	16	"Braid covers T'Pau"	Braid	"Heart and Soul" by T'Pau	TBA	September 9, 2014
180	17	"New Politics covers Vampire Weekend"	New Politics	"A-Punk" by Vampire Weekend	TBA	September 11, 2014
181	18	"FancyBread covers Coyote Shivers"	FancyBread	"Sugarhigh" by Coyote Shivers	TBA	September 12, 2014
182	19	"Strand of Oaks covers Asia"	Strand of Oaks	"Heat of the Moment" by Asia	TBA	September 16, 2014
183	20	"American Football covers Elvis Costello"	American Football	"Alison" by Elvis Costello	TBA	September 23, 2014
184	21	"The Apache Relay covers Pulp"	The Apache Relay	"Babies" by Pulp	TBA	September 30, 2014
185	22	"Honeyblood covers Green Day"	Honeyblood	"When I Come Around" by Green Day	TBA	October 2, 2014
186	23	"Split Single covers TV on the Radio"	Split Single	"Wolf Like Me" by TV on the Radio	TBA	October 7, 2014
187	24	"OK Go covers Squeeze"	OK Go	"Tempted" by Squeeze	TBA	October 14, 2014
188	25	"Trampled by Turtles covers Yes"	Trampled by Turtles	"Owner of a Lonely Heart" by Yes	TBA	October 21, 2014
189	26	"Gwar covers Pet Shop Boys (voted favorite of 2014)"	Gwar	"West End Girls" by Pet Shop Boys	TBA	October 28, 2014
190	27	"The Weeks covers Arrested Development"	The Weeks	"Tennessee" by Arrested Development	TBA	November 4, 2014
191	28	"Absolutely Free covers the Jam"	Absolutely Free	"A Town Called Malice" by the Jam	TBA	November 11, 2014
192	29	"Sebadoh covers Rush"	Sebadoh	"Limelight" by Rush	TBA	November 18, 2014
193	30	"Nathaniel Rateliff covers the Mountain Goats"	Nathaniel Rateliff	"The Best Ever Death Metal Band In Denton" by the Mountain Goats	TBA	November 25, 2014
194	31	"Stars covers PJ Harvey"	Stars	"O Stella" by PJ Harvey	TBA	December 2, 2014
195	32	"A.V. Undercover 2014: Watch the recap and vote for your favorites"	TBA	"	TBA	December 4, 2014

=== Holiday Undercover (2014) ===
No. overall	No. in season	Title	Band	Song	Performers	Release date
196	1	"Nick Lowe & Los Straitjackets cover 'I Wish It Could Be Christmas Everyday'"	Nick Lowe, Los Straitjackets	"I Wish It Could Be Christmas Everyday" by Wizzard	TBA	December 9, 2014
197	2	"Gruff Rhys covers 'If I Had the World to Give'"	Gruff Rhys	"If I Had the World to Give" by The Grateful Dead	TBA	December 16, 2014
198	3	"Harry Shearer and Judith Owen cover 'Christmas with the Devil'"	Harry Shearer, Judith Owen	"Christmas with the Devil" by Spınal Tap	TBA	December 23, 2014
199	4	"Into It. Over It. covers 'Assassination on X-Mas Eve'"	Into It. Over It.	"Assassination on X-Mas Eve" by Archers of Loaf	TBA	December 30, 2014

=== Season 6 (2015) ===
No. overall	No. in season	Title	Band	Song	Performers	Release date
200	1	"Laura Jane Grace covers Michael McDonald"	Laura Jane Grace	"I Keep Forgettin' (Every Time You're Near)" by Michael McDonald	TBA	April 28, 2015
201	2	"Jeff Rosenstock A.V. Undercover medley"	Jeff Rosenstock	"Ever Fallen in Love (With Someone You Shouldn't've)" by Buzzcocks, "Panama" by Van Halen, "Thinkin Bout You" by Frank Ocean, "Bizarre Love Triangle" by New Order	TBA	May 5, 2015
201	2	"Andrew Jackson Jihad A.V. Undercover medley"	Andrew Jackson Jihad	"Psycho Killer" by Talking Heads, "Heart of Gold" by Neil Young, "Barracuda" by Heart, "Gates of Steel" by Devo, "We Got the Beat" by Go-Gos, "Go Your Own Way" by Fleetwood Mac, "Linger" by the Cranberries, Teenage Dirtbag" by Wheatus, "Surrender" by Cheap Trick, "Undone" by Weezer, Plush" by Stone Temple Pilots, Prayer to God" by Shellac	TBA	May 5, 2015
202	3	"Punch Brothers covers the Strokes"	Punch Brothers	"Reptilia" by the Strokes	TBA	May 12, 2015
203	4	"Béla Fleck & Abigail Washburn cover Europe"	Béla Fleck, Abigail Washburn	"The Final Countdown" by Europe	Béla Fleck, Abigail Washburn	May 19, 2015
204	5	"Philly Boy Roy covers Styx"	Philly Boy Roy	"Renegade" by Styx	TBA	May 26, 2015
205	6	"Screaming Females covers Taylor Swift (voted favorite of 2015)"	Screaming Females	"Shake It Off" by Taylor Swift	TBA	June 2, 2015
206	7	"Leighton Meester covers the Cardigans"	Leighton Meester	"Lovefool" by the Cardigans	TBA	June 9, 2015
207	8	"Sylvan Esso (and Flock of Dimes) covers Gillian Welch"	Sylvan Esso	"Everything Is Free" by Gillian Welch	TBA	June 16, 2015
208	9	"Flock of Dimes (and Sylvan Esso) cover Crowded House"	Flock of Dimes	"Don't Dream It's Over" by Crowded House	TBA	June 16, 2015
209	10	"They Might Be Giants covers Destiny's Child"	They Might Be Giants	"Bills, Bills, Bills" by Destiny's Child	TBA	June 23, 2015
210	11	"The Minus 5 covers the Runaways"	The Minus 5	"Cherry Bomb" by the Runaways	TBA	June 30, 2015
211	12	"Local H covers Peter Gabriel"	Local H	"Shock the Monkey" by Peter Gabriel	TBA	June 30, 2015
212	13	"Benjamin Booker covers Patsy Cline"	Benjamin Booker	"Walkin' After Midnight" by Patsy Cline	TBA	July 7, 2015
213	14	"La Dispute covers Toadies"	La Dispute	"Possum Kingdom" by Toadies	TBA	July 14, 2015
214	15	"Palma Violets cover James"	Palma Violets	"Laid" by James	TBA	July 21, 2015
215	16	"San Fermin covers Stealers Wheel"	San Fermin	"Stuck in the Middle with You" by Stealers Wheel	TBA	July 28, 2015
216	17	"Josh Rouse covers Blind Melon"	Josh Rouse	"No Rain" by Blind Melon	TBA	August 4, 2015
217	18	"Chumped covers the Crystals"	Chumped	"He's A Rebel" by the Crystals	TBA	August 11, 2015
218	19	"Hippo Campus covers Electric Light Orchestra"	Hippo Campus	"Don't Bring Me Down" by Electric Light Orchestra	TBA	August 18, 2015
219	20	"Colin Hay covers the Velvet Underground"	Colin Hay	"She's My Best Friend" by the Velvet Underground	TBA	May 3, 2015
220	21	"Barenaked Ladies covers Phil Collins"	Barenaked Ladies	"In the Air Tonight" by Phil Collins	TBA	September 1, 2015
221	22	"J Fernandez covers Enya"	J Fernandez	"Orinoco Flow" by Enya	TBA	September 8, 2015
222	23	"Wild Throne covers Paul McCartney & Michael Jackson"	Wild Throne	"Say Say Say" by Paul McCartney, Michael Jackson	TBA	September 15, 2015
223	24	"The Weather Station covers Joy Division"	The Weather Station	"Transmission" by Joy Division	TBA	September 22, 2015
224	25	"Ceremony covers Oasis"	Ceremony	"Rock 'n' Roll Star" by Oasis	TBA	September 29, 2015
225	26	"Troubled Hubble covers Howard Jones"	Troubled Hubble	"Things Can Only Get Better" by Howard Jones	TBA	October 6, 2015
226	27	"Natalie Prass covers Slayer"	Natalie Prass	"Raining Blood" by Slayer	TBA	October 13, 2015
227	28	"Mikal Cronin covers the Mighty Mighty Bosstones"	Mikal Cronin	"The Impression That I Get" by the Mighty Mighty Bosstones	TBA	October 20, 2015
228	29	"Gwar covers Cyndi Lauper"	Gwar	"She-Bop" by Cyndi Lauper	TBA	October 27, 2015
229	30	"Steve 'n' Seagulls covers Beastie Boys"	Steve 'n' Seagulls	"Sabotage" by Beastie Boys	TBA	November 3, 2015
230	31	"Here We Go Magic covers the Fixx"	Here We Go Magic	"One Thing Leads to Another" by the Fixx	TBA	November 10, 2015
231	32	"Iron & Wine covers Gwar"	Iron & Wine	"Sick of You" by Gwar	TBA	November 17, 2015
232	33	"A.V. Undercover 2015: Watch the recap and vote for your favorites"	TBA	TBA	TBA	November 25, 2015

=== Holiday Undercover (2015) ===
No. overall	No. in season	Title	Band	Song	Performers	Release date
233	1	"Craig Finn and Esme Patterson cover Low"	Craig Finn, Esme Patterson	"Just Like Christmas" by Low	TBA	December 1, 2015
234	2	"Laura Stevenson covers Elliott Smith"	Laura Stevenson	"Angel in the Snow" by Elliott Smith	TBA	December 8, 2015
235	3	"Ashley Monroe covers Joni Mitchell"	Ashley Monroe	"River" by Joni Mitchell	TBA	December 15, 2015
236	4	"Drive-By Truckers cover I Believe in Father Christmas"	Drive-By Truckers	"I Believe in Father Christmas" by Greg Lake	TBA	December 22, 2015

=== Season 7 (2016) ===
No. overall	No. in season	Title	Band	Song	Performers	Release date
237	1	"Barenaked Ladies cover themselves"	Barenaked Ladies	"One Week" by Barenaked Ladies	TBA	February 11, 2016
238	2	"Eric Bachmann and a string quartet play a song from his new record"	Eric Bachmann	"Dreaming" by Eric Bachmann	TBA	March 25, 2016
239	3	"Wye Oak covers Pat Benatar"	Wye Oak	"We Belong" by Pat Benatar	TBA	March 29, 2016
240	4	"Colin Hay revisits Men at Work"	Colin Hay	"Overkill" by Men at Work	TBA	May 3, 2016
241	5	"Shearwater covers the entirety of David Bowie's Lodger"	Shearwater	"Lodger" by David Bowie	TBA	May 13, 2016
242	6	"Eric Bachmann covers David Bowie"	Eric Bachmann	"Heroes" by David Bowie	TBA	May 17, 2016
243	7	"Tacocat covers Katy Perry"	Tacocat	"Roar" by Katy Perry	TBA	May 24, 2016
244	8	"Julien Baker covers Death Cab for Cutie (voted favorite of 2016)"	Julien Baker	"Photobooth" by Death Cab for Cutie	TBA	May 31, 2016
245	9	"Rob Crow covers Men at Work"	Rob Crow	"Overkill" by Men at Work	TBA	June 7, 2016
246	10	"Le Butcherettes covers Miley Cyrus"	Le Butcherettes	"Wrecking Ball" by Miley Cyrus	TBA	June 14, 2016
247	11	"Wellington International Ukulele Orchestra covers Thin Lizzy"	Wellington International Ukulele Orchestra	"The Boys Are Back in Town" by Thin Lizzy	TBA	June 21, 2016
248	12	"The Falcon covers the Georgia Satellites"	The Falcon	"Keep Your Hands to Yourself"/"Timber" by the Georgia Satellites/Pitbull	TBA	June 28, 2016
249	13	"Operators cover Nena"	Operators	"99 Red Balloons" by Nena	TBA	July 5, 2016
250	14	"Shearwater covers Bauhaus"	Shearwater	"Kick in the Eye" by Bauhaus	TBA	July 12, 2016
251	15	"Sean Watkins covers the Left Banke"	Sean Watkins	"Walk Away Renee" by the Left Banke	TBA	July 19, 2016
252	16	"HXLT covers Ginuwine"	HXLT	"Pony" by Ginuwine	TBA	July 26, 2016
253	17	"Har Mar Superstar covers Built to Spill"	Har Mar Superstar	"Big Dipper" by Built to Spill	TBA	August 2, 2016
254	18	"Har Mar Superstar covers Prince"	Har Mar Superstar	"When You Were Mine" by Prince	TBA	August 2, 2016
255	19	"The Infamous Stringdusters covers the Killers"	The Infamous Stringdusters	"When You Were Young" by the Killers	TBA	August 9, 2016
256	20	"Trashcan Sinatras play "Best Days on Earth""	Trashcan Sinatras	"Best Days on Earth" by Trashcan Sinatras	TBA	August 11, 2016
257	22	"Bleached covers Misfits"	Bleached	"Skulls" by Misfits	TBA	August 16, 2016
258	22	"Mothers covers Glenn Frey"	Mothers	"The Heat Is On" by Glenn Frey	TBA	August 23, 2016
259	23	"Napalm Death does not cover Motörhead"	Napalm Death	"How the Years Condemn" by Napalm Death	TBA	August 26, 2016
260	24	"Bully covers Sum 41"	Bully	"Fat Lip" by Sum 41	TBA	August 30, 2016
261	25	"Brass Bed covers Van Halen"	Brass Bed	"Why Can't This Be Love" by Van Halen	TBA	September 6, 2016
262	26	"Trashcan Sinatras covers Wye Oak"	Trashcan Sinatras	"Holy Holy" by Wye Oak	TBA	September 13, 2016
263	27	"Trashcan Sinatras play 'Weightlifting'"	Trashcan Sinatras by Trashcan Sinatras	"Weightlifting"	TBA	September 20, 2016
264	28	"PWR BTTM cover Counting Crows"	PWR BTTM	"Mr. Jones" by Counting Crows	TBA	September 22, 2016
265	29	"The Wombats cover Goo Goo Dolls"	The Wombats	"Iris" by Goo Goo Dolls	TBA	September 27, 2016
266	30	"Luna covers Motörhead"	Luna	"Killed by Death" by Motörhead	TBA	October 4, 2016
267	31	"Deerhoof covers Adam Ant"	Deerhoof	"Goody Two Shoes" by Adam Ant	TBA	October 11, 2016
269	32	"Touché Amoré covers Pearl Jam"	Touche Amore	"Corduroy" by Pearl Jam	TBA	October 18, 2016
274	33	"Gwar covers AC/DC"	Gwar	"If You Want Blood (You've Got It)" by AC/DC	TBA	November 8, 2016
275	34	"Joyce Manor covers the National"	Joyce Manor	"Mistaken for Strangers" by the National	TBA	November 15, 2016
276	35	"Chrissy & Hawley covers Erasure"	Chrissy & Hawley	"A Little Respect" by Erasure	TBA	November 22, 2016
277	36	"A.V. Undercover 2016: Watch the recap and vote for your favorite"	TBA	"	TBA	December 5, 2016

=== The Day of the Dead (2016) ===
No. overall	No. in season	Title	Band	Song	Performers	Release date
268	1	"AJJ covers David Bowie"	AJJ	"Quicksand" by David Bowie	TBA	October 17, 2016
270	2	"Shovels & Rope covers Lou Reed"	Shovels & Rope	"Perfect Day" by Lou Reed	TBA	October 21, 2016
271	3	"Robbie Fulks covers Freddy Powers"	Robbie Fulks	"Little Hotel Room" by Freddy Powers	TBA	October 25, 2016
272	4	"Adam Torres covers the Drifters"	Adam Torres	"This Magic Moment" by the Drifters	TBA	October 31, 2016
273	5	"Local Natives covers David Bowie"	Local Natives	"Teenage Wildlife" by David Bowie	TBA	November 2, 2016

=== Holiday Undercover (2016) ===
No. overall	No. in season	Title	Band	Song	Performers	Release date
278	1	"Shonen Knife covers We Wish You a Merry Christmas"	Shonen Knife	"We Wish You a Merry Christmas	TBA	December 6, 2016
279	2	"Wild Beasts covers Madonna"	Wild Beasts	"Frozen" by Madonna	TBA	December 13, 2016
280	3	"Cheap Girls covers Counting Crows"	Cheap Girls	"A Long December" by Counting Crows	TBA	December 20, 2016

=== Guardians of the Galaxy Vol. 2 (2017) ===
No. overall	No. in season	Title	Band	Song	Performers	Release date
281	1	"Dude York covers 'Brandy' in honor of Guardians of the Galaxy Vol. 2"	Dude York	"Brandy (You're a Fine Girl)" by Looking Glass	TBA	May 2, 2017
282	2	"Crystal Fighters cover 'Hooked on a Feeling' just in time for Guardians of the Galaxy Vol. 2"	Crystal Fighters	"Hooked on a Feeling" by B.J. Thomas	TBA	May 4, 2017
283	3	"Close Talker covers 'Fox on the Run'"	Close Talker	"Fox on the Run" by Sweet	TBA	May 9, 2017
284	4	"Pet Symmetry rockets 'Come a Little Bit Closer' into space"	Pet Symmetry	"Come a Little Bit Closer" by Jay and the Americans	TBA	May 11, 2017

=== Season 8 (2017) ===
No. overall	No. in season	Title	Band	Song	Performers	Release date
285	1	"Watch The Regrettes' ferocious take on 'Fox on the Run""	The Regrettes	"Fox on the Run" by Sweet	TBA	May 15, 2017
286	2	"Phantogram channels Courtney Love, kicks off season 8 of A.V. Undercover"	Phantogram	"Violet" by Hole	Sarah Barthel, Josh Carter	May 23, 2017
287	3	"Lee Fields gives a heartwarming take on Neil Diamond's 'America'"	Lee Fields	"America" by Neil Diamond	TBA	May 30, 2017
288	4	"Passenger delivers a surprisingly sweet take on 'No Scrubs'"	Passenger	"No Scrubs" by TLC	TBA	June 6, 2017
289	5	"Austra go-goes for broke, covers 'Heaven Is a Place on Earth'"	Austra	"Heaven Is a Place on Earth" by Belinda Carlisle	TBA	June 13, 2017
290	6	"Crying delivers a spirited cover of Carly Rae Jepsen's 'Run Away with Me'"	Crying	"Run Away with Me" by Carly Rae Jepsen	TBA	June 20, 2017
291	7	"Xiu Xiu takes on ZZ Top's 'Sharp Dressed Man'"	Xiu Xiu	"Sharp Dressed Man" by ZZ Top	TBA	June 27, 2017
292	8	"Cloud Nothings deliver a polarizing take on Coldplay's 'Clocks'"	Cloud Nothings	"Clocks" by Coldplay	TBA	July 3, 2017
293	9	"Judah & the Lion bring bluegrass flair to the Foo Fighters' 'Monkey Wrench'"	Judah & the Lion	"Monkey Wrench" by Foo Fighters	TBA	July 11, 2017
294	10	"Minus the Bear busts our new Undercover sign rocking out to Fugazi's 'Waiting Room'"	Minus the Bear	"Waiting Room" by Fugazi	TBA	July 18, 2017
295	11	"Watch Oozing Wound hate-cover Blink-182's 'Dammit'"	Oozing Wound	"Dammit" by Blink-182	TBA	July 25, 2017
296	12	"The Old 97's pay homage to T. Rex's '20th Century Boy'"	Old 97's	"20th Century Boy" by T. Rex	TBA	August 1, 2017
297	13	"Charly Bliss finds its perfect match with Len's 'Steal My Sunshine'"	Charly Bliss	"Steal My Sunshine" by Len	TBA	August 8, 2017
298	14	"Jerrod Niemann gives a country twang to Paramore's 'Ain't It Fun'"	Jerrod Niemann	"Ain't It Fun" by Paramore	TBA	August 15, 2017
299	15	"Fastball pays tribute to country royalty with a cover of Dolly Parton's '9 to 5'"	Fastball	"9 to 5" by Dolly Parton	TBA	August 22, 2017
300	16	"Tigers Jaw has some fun with Outkast's 'Hey Ya'"	Tigers Jaw	"Hey Ya!" by Outkast	TBA	August 29, 2017
301	17	"Dirty Dozen Brass Band transports us to Bourbon Street with Beck's 'Debra'"	Dirty Dozen Brass Band	"Debra" by Beck	TBA	September 5, 2017
302	18	"Priests salutes teenage rebellion with Rod Stewart's 'Young Turks'"	Priests	"Young Turks" by Rod Stewart	TBA	September 12, 2017
303	19	"SWMRS's version of 'Bad Reputation' doesn't mess with the Joan Jett classic"	SWMRS	"Bad Reputation" by Joan Jett	TBA	September 19, 2017
304	20	"A-ha's 'Take On Me' gets a swinging tribute courtesy of Lake Street Dive"	Lake Street Dive	"Take On Me" by A-ha	TBA	September 26, 2017
305	21	"Cap'n Jazz and Hop Along team up to take on Sonic Youth's '100%'"	Cap'n Jazz	"100%" by Sonic Youth	TBA	October 3, 2017
306	22	"The Big Moon serves up a stellar rendition of 'Total Eclipse of the Heart'"	The Big Moon	"Total Eclipse of the Heart" by Bonnie Tyler	TBA	October 10, 2017
307	23	"Watch Gogol Bordello take on Natalie Imbrugulia for A.V. Undercover"	Gogol Bordello	"Torn" by Natalie Imbruglia	TBA	October 17, 2017
308	24	"Watch Pile channel Radiohead with this cover of an OK Computer classic"	Pile	"The Tourist" by Radiohead	TBA	October 24, 2017
309	25	"Atlas Genius performs a stripped-down cover of Hootie and the Blowfish's 'Only Wanna Be With You'"	Atlas Genius	"Only Wanna Be With You" by Hootie and the Blowfish	TBA	October 31, 2017
310	26	"Filthy Friends cap off this year's Undercover with a melancholy version of Whitney's 'How Will I Know'"	Filthy Friends	"How Will I Know" by Whitney Houston	TBA	November 7, 2017

=== Season 9 (2024) ===
No. overall	No. in season	Title	Band	Song	Performers	Release date
311	1	"GWAR cover 'I'm Just Ken' (from 'Barbie The Album') by Ryan Gosling"	Gwar	"I'm Just Ken" by Ryan Gosling	TBA	July 17, 2024
312	2	"Ducks Ltd. cover "They'll Need a Crane" by They Might Be Giants"	Ducks Ltd.	"They'll Need a Crane" by They Might Be Giants	TBA	July 30, 2024
313	3	"IAN SWEET covers "Seventeen" by Sharon Van Etten"	IAN SWEET	"Seventeen" by Sharon Van Etten	TBA	August 14, 2024
314	4	"Ginger Root cover "This Will Be Our Year" by The Zombies"	Ginger Root	"This Will Be Our Year" by The Zombies	TBA	September 18, 2024
315	5	"Dawes cover "Common People" by Pulp"	Taylor Goldsmith (of Dawes)	"Common People" by Pulp	TBA	October 30, 2024
316	6	"Jordana covers "Kiss Me" by Sixpence None the Richer"	Jordana	"Kiss Me" by Sixpence None the Richer	TBA	November 6, 2024
317	7	"SASAMI covers "Cut To The Feeling" by Carly Rae Jepsen"	SASAMI	"Cut to the Feeling" by Carly Rae Jepsen	TBA	November 13, 2024
318	8	"Skegss cover "Don't Change" by INXS"	Skegss	"Don't Change" by INXS	TBA	November 20, 2024
319	9	"Peel Dream Magazine cover "Dry The Rain" by The Beta Band"	Peel Dream Magazine	"Dry the Rain" by The Beta Band	TBA	November 27, 2024
320	10	"Cloud Nothings cover "Naked As We Came" by Iron & Wine"	Cloud Nothings	"Naked As We Came" by Iron & Wine	TBA	December 4, 2024

=== Season 10 (2025) ===
No. overall	No. in season	Title	Band	Song	Performers	Release date
321	1	"OK Go covers "There She Goes" by The La's"	OK Go	"There She Goes" by The La's	TBA	December 18, 2025
322	2	"Rhett Miller covers "Cruel To Be Kind" by Nick Lowe"	Rhett Miller	"Cruel to Be Kind" by Nick Lowe	TBA	December 22, 2025
323	3	"The Wood Brothers cover "Maps" by Yeah Yeah Yeahs"	The Wood Brothers	"Maps" by Yeah Yeah Yeahs	TBA	January 8, 2026
324	4	"GWAR cover "Pink Pony Club" by Chappell Roan"	GWAR	"Pink Pony Club" by Chappell Roan	TBA	January 15, 2026
325	5	"Gogol Bordello cover "In Dreams" by Roy Orbison"	Gogol Bordello	"In Dreams" by Roy Orbison	TBA	February 13, 2026
