= The Difference Between Houses and Homes =

The Difference Between Houses and Homes: Lost Songs and Loose Ends 1995-2001

Compilation album by Cursive
- Released: 2005
- Genre: Emo, post-hardcore, indie rock
- Length: 39:13
- Label: Saddle Creek
- Producer: A.J. Mogis and Mike Mogis

Cursive chronology
The Ugly Organ (2003)	The Difference Between Houses and Homes: Lost Songs and Loose Ends 1995-2001 (2005)	Happy Hollow (2006)

Professional ratings
Review scores
Source	Rating
Allmusic	3.5/5 stars
Kludge	8/10
Punknews.org	5/10 stars
Rolling Stone	3/5 stars

The Difference Between Houses and Homes (2005) is a compilation by American indie band Cursive of some of their early material. It is subtitled Lost Songs and Loose Ends 1995–2001. This compilation features songs from The Icebreaker 7", The Disruption 7", Sucker and Dry 7", and the split between Cursive and Small Brown Bike.

This album is the 70th release of Saddle Creek Records.

== Track listing ==
No.	Title	Length
1.	"Dispenser"	3:09
2.	"Pivotal"	2:48
3.	"Sucker & Dry"	3:07
4.	"Icebreakers"	4:48
5.	"And the Bit Just Chokes Them"	4:53
6.	"There's a Coldest Day in Every Year"	2:26
7.	"A Disruption in the Normal Swing of Things"	2:52
8.	"Nostalgia"	3:26
9.	"The Knowledgeable Hasbeens"	3:02
10.	"Polar"	5:40
11.	"A Disruption in Our Lines of Influence"	2:23
12.	"I Thought There'd Be More Than This"	2:39

== Personnel: Tracks 1–7 and 9–12 ==
- Tim Kasher – vocals, guitar
- Steve Pedersen – guitar, vocals
- Matt Maginn – bass, vocals
- Clint Schnase – drums

== Personnel: Track 8 ==
- Tim Kasher – vocals, guitar
- Ted Stevens – guitar, vocals
- Matt Maginn – bass, vocals
- Clint Schnase – drums
- Gretta Cohn – cello

== Additional information ==
- The artwork on the album and the story book that accompanies it was drawn by Yuriko Yoshino, a member of the Japanese punk band, Eastern Youth, with whom Cursive did a split.
- All songs mastered by Doug Van Sloun at Studio B in Omaha, NE.
