= The Icebreaker =

EP by Cursive
- Released: 1998
- Genre: Indie rock
- Length: 11:56
- Label: Saddle Creek Records

Cursive chronology
Such Blinding Stars For Starving Eyes (1997)	The Icebreaker (1998)	The Storms of Early Summer: Semantics of Song (1998)

The Icebreaker is an EP by American indie band Cursive. It was released in 1998 after the release of the band's first full length, Such Blinding Stars For Starving Eyes.

Most of the songs were later put on the compilation, The Difference Between Houses and Homes in 2005.

== Track listing ==
No.	Title	Length
1.	"Polar" (Intro)	1:21
2.	"Icebreakers"	4:45
3.	"Pivotal"	3:01
4.	"Polar"	2:49

== Personnel ==
- Tim Kasher – vocals, guitar
- Steve Pedersen – guitar
- Matt Maginn – bass
- Clint Schnase – drums
