= Vitriola =

Studio album by Cursive
- Released: October 5, 2018
- Genres: Emo, indie rock, post-hardcore
- Length: 44:33
- Labels: 15 Passenger, Big Scary Monsters (UK & EU)
- Producers: Mike Mogis and Cursive

Cursive chronology
| I Am Gemini (2012) | Vitriola (2018) | Get Fixed (2019) |

Vitriola is the eighth studio album by the post-hardcore band Cursive, released on October 5, 2018 on the band's own label 15 Passenger Records. The album is the first release from Cursive in six years, the first with original drummer Clint Schnase since 2006's Happy Hollow, and the first Cursive release to feature a cellist – Megan Seibe – since 2003's The Ugly Organ.

== Critical reception ==
Professional ratings
Aggregate scores
| Source | Rating |
|---|---|
| Metacritic | 69/100 |
Review scores
| Source | Rating |
| AllMusic | 3.5/5 stars |
| DIY | 4/5 stars |
| Pitchfork | 6.8/10 |
| PopMatters | 5/10 |
| Sputnikmusic | 4/5 stars |

Vitriola received a weighted average score of 69 out of 100, indicating "generally favorable reviews," from the music review aggregator Metacritic. Fred Thomas of AllMusic compares the album to previous Cursive releases, saying, "While it can feel relentless at times, these songs find Kasher and his bandmates swinging at anything that moves with all the passion and power of their best albums." Sputnikmusic's Channing Freemen makes a similar assertion, specifically comparing the album to The Ugly Organ in its vibe and tone.

== Track listing ==
All tracks are written by Cursive.

| No. | Title | Length |
|---|---|---|
| 1. | "Free To Be Or Not To Be You And Me" | 3:26 |
| 2. | "Pick Up The Pieces" | 3:24 |
| 3. | "It's Gonna Hurt" | 5:31 |
| 4. | "Under The Rainbow" | 3:19 |
| 5. | "Remorse" | 3:23 |
| 6. | "Ouroboros" | 5:59 |
| 7. | "Everending" | 4:11 |
| 8. | "Ghost Writer" | 3:07 |
| 9. | "Life Savings" | 4:40 |
| 10. | "Noble Soldier/Dystopian Lament" | 7:27 |
| Total length: | | 44:33 |

== Personnel ==
- Tim Kasher – vocals and guitar
- Ted Stevens – guitar and vocals
- Matt Maginn – bass
- Patrick Newberry – keyboards, piano, and horns
- Clint Schnase – drums
- Megan Siebe – cello
- Mike Mogis – additional instrumentation

== Charts ==
| Chart (2018) | Peak position |
|---|---|
| US Independent Albums (Billboard) | 21 |
