= Small Brown Bike / Cursive =

Cursive/Small Brown Bike Split

EP by Cursive and Small Brown Bike
- Released: March 2001
- Genre: Indie rock, Emo
- Label: Makoto Recordings

Cursive/Small Brown Bike Split is a split album between Cursive and Small Brown Bike. It was released in March 2001 on Makoto Recordings. The 7" was pressed on lime green vinyl that matched the cover and was limited to 2,000 copies. The Cursive song "Nostalgia" later made its way onto their compilation, The Difference Between Houses and Homes.

== Track listing ==
1. Small Brown Bike - "My Unanswered Whys"
2. Cursive - "Nostalgia"
