= Silver Scooter / Cursive =

EP by Cursive and Silver Scooter
- Released: 1998 (10") May 5, 1999 (CD)
- Genre: Indie rock, emo
- Label: Crank!
- Producer: A.J. Mogis, Dave McNair

Silver Scooter / Cursive is a split EP by the bands Silver Scooter and Cursive. It was released in 1998 in a 10" vinyl format on Crank! Records and later re-released on CD on May 5, 1999. Silver Scooter's songs were produced by the band and Dave McNair, while Cursive's songs were produced by A.J. Mogis.

== Track listing ==
Silver Scooter
No.	Title	Length
1.	"Sunlight"	3:28
2.	"Bob's B.B.Q."	2:16
3.	"D"	3:03
4.	"Holding the Flare"	5:15

Cursive
No.	Title	Length
5.	"Returns and Exchanges"	3:55
6.	"Pulse"	3:57
7.	"Tides Rush In"	4:04
