= Such Blinding Stars for Starving Eyes =

Such Blinding Stars For Starving Eyes

Studio album by Cursive
- Released: September 9, 1997
- Recorded: November and December, 1996
- Genre: Emo, post-hardcore, indie rock
- Length: 42:03
- Label: Crank! Records
- Producer: A.J. Mogis and Mike Mogis

Cursive chronology
Sucker And Dry (1997)	Such Blinding Stars For Starving Eyes (1997)	The Icebreaker (1998)

Professional ratings
Review scores
Source	Rating
AllMusic	3/5 stars

Such Blinding Stars For Starving Eyes is the first full-length album from Omaha, Nebraska band Cursive. Unlike Cursive's later releases, which were released by Saddle Creek Records, this album was released by Crank! Records.

== Track listing ==
All tracks are written by Cursive.

No.	Title	Length
1.	"After the Movies"	4:26
2.	"Downhill Racers"	4:36
3.	"Ceilings Crack"	3:40
4.	"The Dirt of the Vineyard"	4:09
5.	"Target Group"	4:26
6.	"Eight Light Minutes"	2:24
7.	"Vermont"	3:42
8.	"Dedications to Desertion"	3:11
9.	"Warped the Wood Floors"	3:48
10.	"Retirement"	3:50
11.	"The Farewell Party"	3:52

== Personnel ==
Cursive

- Tim Kasher – vocals, guitar
- Steve Pedersen – guitar
- Matt Maginn – bass
- Clint Schnase – drums

Additional personnel

- AJ Mogis – recording, engineering, production
- Mike Mogis – recording, engineering, production
- Eric Medley – mastering
- Ian J. Whitmore – photographs, booklet interior
