= Clint Schnase =

American drummer

Clint Schnase is a musician from Omaha, Nebraska. He played drums in the indie-rock band Cursive from 1995 until late 2006. He also recorded and toured with Bright Eyes, Lullaby For The Working Class, The Good Life, Smashmouth (Indie rock band), Gravy Train, Gymnastics, McVoy, Dumb, Race For Titles, My Fellow Acrobats, The Brigadiers, Pinkerton

== Album Appearances ==
=== With Cursive ===
- The Disruption (1996, Saddle Creek Records)
- Icebreakers 7 (1997, Saddle Creek Records)
- Such Blinding Stars for Starving Eyes (1997, Crank! Records)
- The Storms of Early Summer: Semantics of Song (1998, Saddle Creek Records)
- Domestica (2000, Saddle Creek Records)
- Burst and Bloom (2001, Saddle Creek Records)
- 8 Teeth to Eat You (2002, Better Looking Records)
- The Ugly Organ (2003, Saddle Creek Records)
- Happy Hollow (2006, Saddle Creek Records)
- Vitriola (2018, 15 Passenger)

=== Other ===
- Bright Eyes - Fevers and Mirrors (2000 · Saddle Creek Records)
- Bright Eyes - There Is No Beginning to the Story (2002, Saddle Creek Records)
- Bright Eyes - Lifted or The Story is in the Soil, Keep Your Ear to the Ground (2002 · Saddle Creek Records)
- Lullaby for the Working Class - "Blanket Warm" (1996, Bar/None Records)
- The Good Life - "Novena on a Nocturn" (2000, Better Looking Records)
