= The Storms of Early Summer: Semantics of Song =

Studio album by Cursive
- Released: November 2, 1998
- Genre: Emo, indie rock
- Length: 37:53
- Label: Saddle Creek Records
- Producer: Tim Kasher, AJ Mogis

Cursive chronology
The Icebreaker (1998)	The Storms of Early Summer: Semantics of Song (1998)	Domestica (2000)

Professional ratings
Review scores
Source	Rating
AllMusic	4/5 stars
Pitchfork Media	8.0/10

The Storms of Early Summer: Semantics of Song is the second full-length album by the American indie rock band Cursive, released in 1998.

It was the 22nd release of Saddle Creek Records.

== Track listing ==
No.	Title	Length
1.	"The Rhyme Scheme"	3:44
2.	"A Career in Transcendence"	2:18
3.	"The Road to Financial Stability"	2:33
4.	"Tempest"	2:34
5.	"Break in the New Year"	4:02
6.	"Proposals"	5:05
7.	"Semantics of Sermon"	2:52
8.	"A Little Song and Dance"	3:17
9.	"When Summer's Over Will We Dream of Spring"	3:52
10.	"Northern Winds"	3:00
11.	"Absence Makes the Day Go Longer"	4:34

== Musicians ==
- Tim Kasher
- Matt Maginn
- Steve Pedersen
- Clint Schnase
- AJ Mogis – recording, engineering, production
