= I Am Gemini =

Studio album by Cursive
- Released: February 21, 2012
- Genres: Post-hardcore; punk rock; indie rock
- Length: 43:04
- Labels: Saddle Creek Records, Big Scary Monsters
- Producers: Matt Bayles; Cursive

Cursive chronology
Mama, I'm Swollen (2009)	I Am Gemini (2012)	Vitriola (2018)

Professional ratings
Aggregate scores
Source	Rating
Metacritic	62/100
Review scores
Source	Rating
AllMusic	3.5/5 stars
Alternative Press	3.5/5 stars
The A.V. Club	B
Consequence of Sound	4/5 stars
Drowned in Sound	8/10
mAltIntel	3/5 stars
Paste Magazine	7.8/10
Pitchfork	4.7/10
Rock Sound	8/10

I Am Gemini is the seventh studio album by the post-hardcore band Cursive. It was released in 2012 on Saddle Creek Records in the US and Big Scary Monsters in the UK. This concept album centers on a pair of twins named Castor and Pollux, and, according to frontman Tim Kasher, deals with "mental health, the duality of humanity, and perhaps trying to kill off the more vulgar side of oneself."

== Track listing ==
No.	Title	Length
1.	"This House Alive"	4:13
2.	"Warmer, Warmer"	3:55
3.	"The Sun and Moon"	3:58
4.	"Drunken Birds"	2:33
5.	"Lullaby for No Name"	1:23
6.	"Double Dead"	2:46
7.	"Gemini"	2:28
8.	"Twin Dragon / Hello Skeleton"	5:56
9.	"Wowowow"	3:09
10.	"This House a Lie"	1:31
11.	"The Cat and Mouse"	2:40
12.	"A Birthday Bash"	4:25
13.	"Eulogy for No Name"	4:12

== Personnel ==
- Tim Kasher – vocals, guitars, keyboards, piano
- Matt Maginn – bass, keyboards
- Ted Stevens – guitars, vocals, keyboards
- Cully Symington – drums, percussion
- Patrick Newberry – keyboards (1, 3–6, 8, 9, 13), piano (1, 9)
- Matt Bayles – keyboards (1, 4–6, 10, 13), guitar (9), producer, engineer, mixing
- Erin Rubin – vocals (9, 13)
- Nouela Johnston – vocals (9, 13)
- Naum Hoffman – vocals (1, 13)
- Ed Brooks – mastering
