= Smashmouth =

Smashmouth or smash mouth may refer to:

- Smashmouth offense, an American football system
- Smash Mouth, a pop rock group from San Jose, California, named after the American football term
  - Smash Mouth (album), their self-titled third album
- Smashmouth (indie rock band), an indie rock band from Nebraska
