= Domestica =

Studio album by Cursive
- Released: June 20, 2000
- Genre: Emo; post-hardcore; indie rock
- Length: 32:18
- Label: Saddle Creek
- Producer: Mike Mogis

Cursive chronology
| The Storms of Early Summer: Semantics of Song (1998) | Domestica (2000) | Burst and Bloom (2001) |

Domestica (also styled as Cursive's Domestica) is the third studio album by the American indie rock band Cursive, released on June 20, 2000. This album was the 31st release by Saddle Creek Records, released on CD as well as both red and black vinyl.

== About ==
Domestica is a concept album that tells the story of a relationship between two characters named "Sweetie" and "Pretty Baby." Both characters are mentioned by name in several of the songs on the album ("The Casualty," "The Martyr," "A Red So Deep," and "The Radiator Hums") as well as the title of "The Lament of Pretty Baby."

Lead singer and principal songwriter Tim Kasher went through a divorce prior to writing the songs. Though Kasher maintains that the characters' relationship differs in many key ways from his marriage, he has also stated that some of the story's events were based in reality. While the ending track is ambiguous, Kasher has stated that the couple stays together.

The album is mainly considered emo, post-hardcore and indie rock.

== Reception ==
Professional ratings
Review scores
| Source | Rating |
|---|---|
| AllMusic | 4.5/5 stars |
| Pitchfork | 8.0/10 |
| Robert Christgau | (2-star Honorable Mention) |

In 2014, Stereogum named "The Martyr" in their list of "30 Emo Songs: Late 90s & Early 2000s Essentials."

== Track listing ==
All tracks are written by Cursive.

| No. | Title | Length |
|---|---|---|
| 1. | "The Casualty" | 3:30 |
| 2. | "The Martyr" | 3:57 |
| 3. | "Shallow Means, Deep Ends" | 3:37 |
| 4. | "Making Friends and Acquaintances" | 2:58 |
| 5. | "A Red So Deep" | 4:40 |
| 6. | "The Lament of Pretty Baby" | 3:15 |
| 7. | "The Game of Who Needs Who the Worst" | 3:34 |
| 8. | "The Radiator Hums" | 3:24 |
| 9. | "The Night I Lost the Will to Fight" | 3:19 |
| Total length: | | 32:18 |

== Personnel ==
=== Cursive ===
- Tim Kasher - vocals, guitar
- Matt Maginn - bass, vocals
- Clint Schnase - drums, percussion
- Ted Stevens - guitar, vocals

=== Additional Personnel ===
- AJ Mogis - recording, mixing, mastering
- Mike Mogis - recording, mixing, mastering, production
- Doug Van Sloun - mastering
- Zack Nipper - cover art model for "Sweetie"
- Jenn Bernard - cover art model for "Pretty Baby"
