= Matt Maginn =

American musician

Matt Maginn is a musician from Omaha, Nebraska. He plays bass guitar in the indie-rock band Cursive and is a frequent contributor on a number of Bright Eyes records. He was also a founding member of Slowdown Virginia.

He also helps run Team Love Records and was previously with Saddle Creek Records for 5 years.

He graduated from Creighton University with a degree in environmental science.

== Album appearances ==
=== With Cursive ===
- Such Blinding Stars for Starving Eyes (1997, Crank! Records)
- The Storms of Early Summer: Semantics of Song (1998, Saddle Creek Records)
- Domestica (2000, Saddle Creek Records)
- Burst and Bloom (2001, Saddle Creek Records)
- 8 Teeth to Eat You (2002, Better Looking Records
- The Ugly Organ (2003, Saddle Creek Records)
- Happy Hollow (2006, Saddle Creek Records)
- Mama, I'm Swollen (2009, Saddle Creek records)
- I Am Gemini (2012, Saddle Creek records)

=== Other ===
- Bright Eyes - Letting off the Happiness (1998 · Saddle Creek Records)
- Bright Eyes - Every Day and Every Night (1999 · Saddle Creek Records)
- Bright Eyes - Fevers and Mirrors (2000 · Saddle Creek Records)
- Bright Eyes - There Is No Beginning to the Story (2002, Saddle Creek Records)
- Bright Eyes - Lifted or The Story is in the Soil, Keep Your Ear to the Ground (2002 · Saddle Creek Records)
- Bright Eyes - Lua (Single) (2004 · Saddle Creek Records)
- Bright Eyes - I'm Wide Awake, It's Morning (2005 · Saddle Creek records)
- Mayday - Bushido Karaoke (2005 · Saddle Creek records)
- Tim Kasher - The Game of Monogamy (2010 · Saddle Creek records)
- Man Man - Life Fantastic (2011 · Anti-)
- Bright Eyes - The People's Key (2011 · Saddle Creek records)
