= Mike Mogis =

American multi-instrumentalist

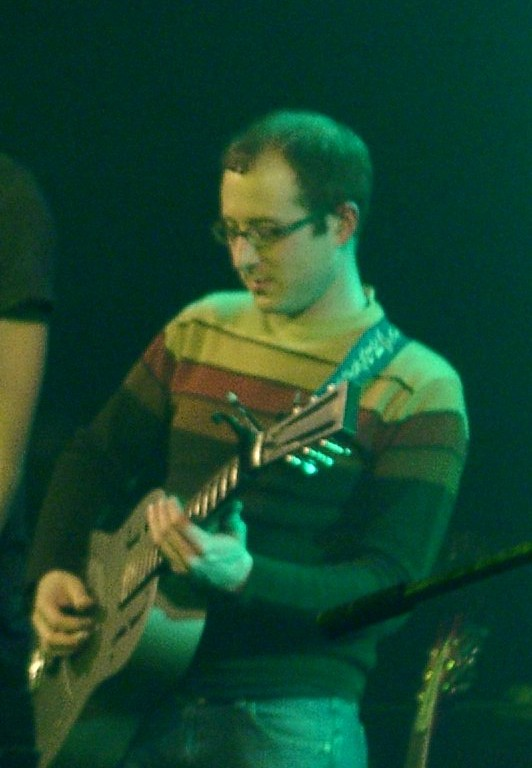

Background information
- Born: Michael Riley Mogis; North Platte, Nebraska, U.S.
- Genres: Indie rock, folk, alt-country, emo
- Occupations: Guitarist, producer
- Instruments: Guitar, mandolin, dobro, lap steel, pedal steel, banjo, 12-string guitar, glockenspiel, Hammered dulcimer
- Years active: 1996–present
- Label: Saddle Creek
- Member of: Bright Eyes
- Formerly of: Monsters of Folk; Lullaby for the Working Class

Mike Mogis is an American producer/mixer/engineer and multi-instrumentalist who owns ARC Studios (Another Recording Company) in downtown Omaha. Mike, along with his brother A.J. Mogis, founded Presto! Recording Studios (previously known as Dead Space Recording and, earlier, Whoopass Recording).

Mogis has produced, mixed, engineered and performed on many of the releases on Saddle Creek, the label he co-founded, including records by Bright Eyes, The Faint, Rilo Kiley, Cursive, The Good Life, Lullaby for the Working Class, Jenny Lewis and Tilly and the Wall.

He is a permanent member of Bright Eyes and was also a member of both Lullaby for the Working Class and We'd Rather Be Flying, generally playing guitar, although he also plays mandolin, banjo, pedal steel, glockenspiel, and hammered dulcimer, among other instruments. He is also a member of the supergroup Monsters of Folk.

In 2014, Mike Mogis and Nate Walcott, also of Bright Eyes, composed the soundtrack for The Fault in Our Stars, based on the novel of the same name by John Green.

In 2017, Mike Mogis mixed Stranger In The Alps by Phoebe Bridgers and in 2020 mixed the Grammy nominated LP Punisher. In 2023, Mike mixed the Grammy winning LP The Record by boygenius as well as the EP The Rest.

== Album appearances ==
see also albums by Bright Eyes.

=== 1997 ===
- Cursive - Such Blinding Stars for Starving Eyes (1997) - Crank! Records

=== 1998 ===
- Bright Eyes - Letting off the Happiness (1998) - Saddle Creek Records

=== 1999 ===
- Bright Eyes - Every Day and Every Night (1999) - Saddle Creek Records
- Amoree Lovell - The Burning Bush (1999) - Amoree Lovell

=== 2000 ===
- The Gloria Record - A Lull In Traffic (2000) - Crank! Records
- Bright Eyes - Fevers and Mirrors (2000) - Saddle Creek Records
- Cursive - Domestica (2000) - Saddle Creek Records
- Melon Galia - Les embarras du quotidien (2000) - Les disques mange-tout
- Songs: Ohia - Ghost Tropic (2000) - Secretly Canadian

=== 2001 ===
- Cursive - Burst and Bloom (2001) - Saddle Creek Records

=== 2002 ===
- The Gloria Record - Start Here (2002) - Arena Rock Recording Co.
- Bright Eyes - There Is No Beginning to the Story (2002) - Saddle Creek Records
- Bright Eyes - Lifted or The Story is in the Soil, Keep Your Ear to the Ground (2002) - Saddle Creek Records
- Cursive - 8 Teeth to Eat You (2002) - Better Looking Records
- My Little Cheap Dictaphone - Music Drama (2002) - Soundstation

=== 2003 ===
- Azure Ray - Hold On Love (2003) - Saddle Creek Records
- Cursive - The Ugly Organ (2003) - Saddle Creek Records
- Rilo Kiley - The Execution of All Things (2003) - Saddle Creek Records

=== 2004 ===
- Azure Ray - New Resolution (2004) - Saddle Creek Records
- Bright Eyes - Lua (Single) (2004) - Saddle Creek Records
- Bright Eyes - Take It Easy (Love Nothing) (2004) - Saddle Creek Records
- Bright Eyes/Neva Dinova - One Jug of Wine, Two Vessels (2004) - Crank! Records
- Broken Spindles - fulfilled/complete (2004) - Saddle Creek Records
- Cursive - The Recluse (2004) - Saddle Creek Records
- The Elected - Me First (2004) - Sub Pop
- The Faint - Wet from Birth (2004) - Saddle Creek Records
- The Faint - I Disappear (2004) - Saddle Creek Records
- The Good Life - Album of the Year (2004) - Saddle Creek Records
- Johnathan Rice - Extended Player 24:26 (2004) - Reprise/WEA
- Rilo Kiley - More Adventurous (2004) - Brute/Beaute Records
- The Saddest Landscape - Lift Your Burdens High for This is Where We Cross (2004)
- Son, Ambulance - Key (2004) - Saddle Creek Records
- Statistics - Leave Your Name (2004) - Jade Tree Records

=== 2005 ===
- Bright Eyes - I'm Wide Awake, It's Morning (2005) · Saddle Creek Records
- Bright Eyes - Digital Ash in a Digital Urn (2005) - Saddle Creek Records
- Bright Eyes - Motion Sickness (2005) - Team Love Records
- Johnathan Rice - Trouble Is Real (2005) - Reprise/WEA
- Johnathan Rice - Kiss Me Goodbye (2005)
- Son, Ambulance - Key (2005) - Saddle Creek Records
- Maria Taylor - 11:11 (2005) - Saddle Creek Records

=== 2006 ===
- The Concretes - The Concretes in Colour (2006) - Astralwerks
- Cursive - Happy Hollow (2006) - Saddle Creek Records
- Jenny Lewis with the Watson Twins - Rabbit Fur Coat (2006) - Team Love Records
- Men, Women & Children - Men, Women & Children (2006) - Reprise/WEA
- M. Ward - Post-War (2006) - Merge Records

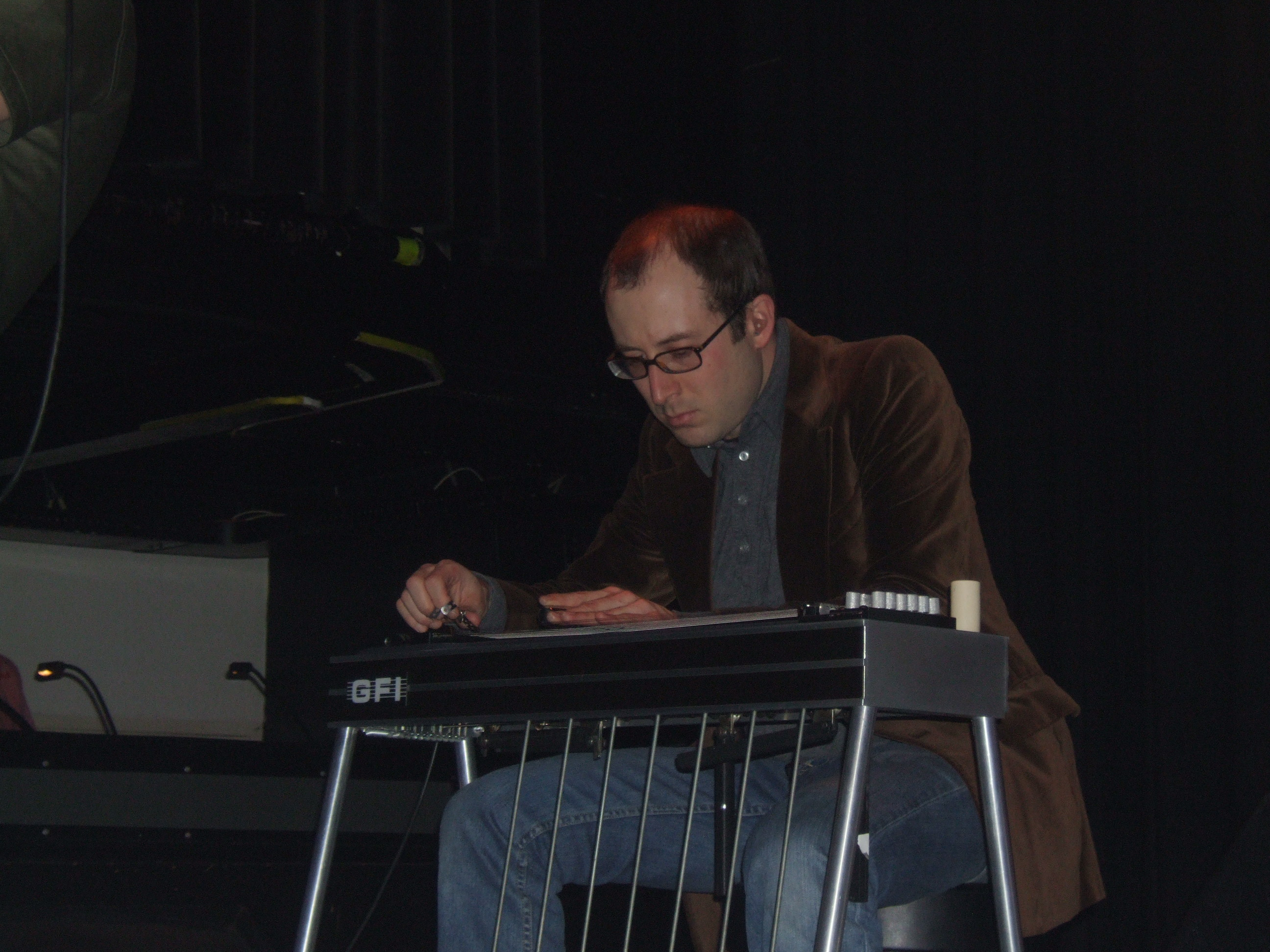
Mike Mogis playing the pedal steel

=== 2007 ===
- Bright Eyes - Four Winds (2007) - Saddle Creek
- Bright Eyes - Cassadaga (2007) - Saddle Creek

=== 2008 ===
- Lightspeed Champion - Falling Off the Lavender Bridge (2008) - Domino Recording Company
- She and Him - Volume One (2008) - Merge Records
- Tilly and the Wall - o (2008) - Team Love Records
- Rachael Yamagata - Elephants...Teeth Sinking into Heart (2008) - Warner Bros. Records

=== 2009 ===
- Alessi's Ark - Notes from the Treehouse (2009) - EMI Records
- M. Ward - Hold Time (2009) - Merge Records
- Pete Yorn - Back and Fourth (2009) - Columbia Records
- Monsters of Folk - Monsters of Folk (2009) - Shangri-La Music
- Sea Wolf - White Water, White Bloom (2009) - Dangerbird Records
- Julian Casablancas - Phrazes for the Young (2009) - Cult Records via RCA

=== 2010 ===
- She and Him - Volume Two (2010) - Merge Records

=== 2011 ===
- Bright Eyes - The People's Key (2011) - Saddle Creek
- Man Man - Life Fantastic (2011)

=== 2012 ===
- First Aid Kit - The Lion's Roar (2012)

=== 2014 ===
- First Aid Kit - Stay Gold (2014)

=== 2016 ===
- Conor Oberst - Ruminations (2016) - Nonesuch Records
- Joseph - I'm Alone, No You're Not (2016) - ATO Records
- Anthony D'Amato - Coldsnap (2016) - New West Records
- Ruston Kelly - Halloween (2016) - Razor & Tie/Washington Square
- Trashcan Sinatras – Wild Pendulum (2016)

=== 2017 ===
- Phoebe Bridgers - Stranger In The Alps (2017) - Dead Oceans

=== 2020 ===
- Bright Eyes - Down in the Weeds, Where the World Once Was (2020) - Dead Oceans
- Phoebe Bridgers - Punisher (2020) - Dead Oceans

=== 2021 ===
- The Felice Brothers - From Dreams to Dust (2021) - Yep Roc Records

=== 2023 ===
- boygenius - The Record (2023) - Interscope Records
- boygenius - The Rest (2023) - Interscope Records

=== 2024 ===
- Bright Eyes - Five Dice, All Threes (2024) - Dead Oceans

=== 2026 ===
- Phoebe Bridgers - Lost Boys (2026) - Dead Oceans
