= Ted Stevens (musician) =

American rock musician

Ted Stevens (born July 4, 1975) is an American rock musician from Omaha, Nebraska, best known as the guitarist and backup singer for the band Cursive, as well as fronting Mayday. He previously fronted the indie folk band Lullaby for the Working Class.

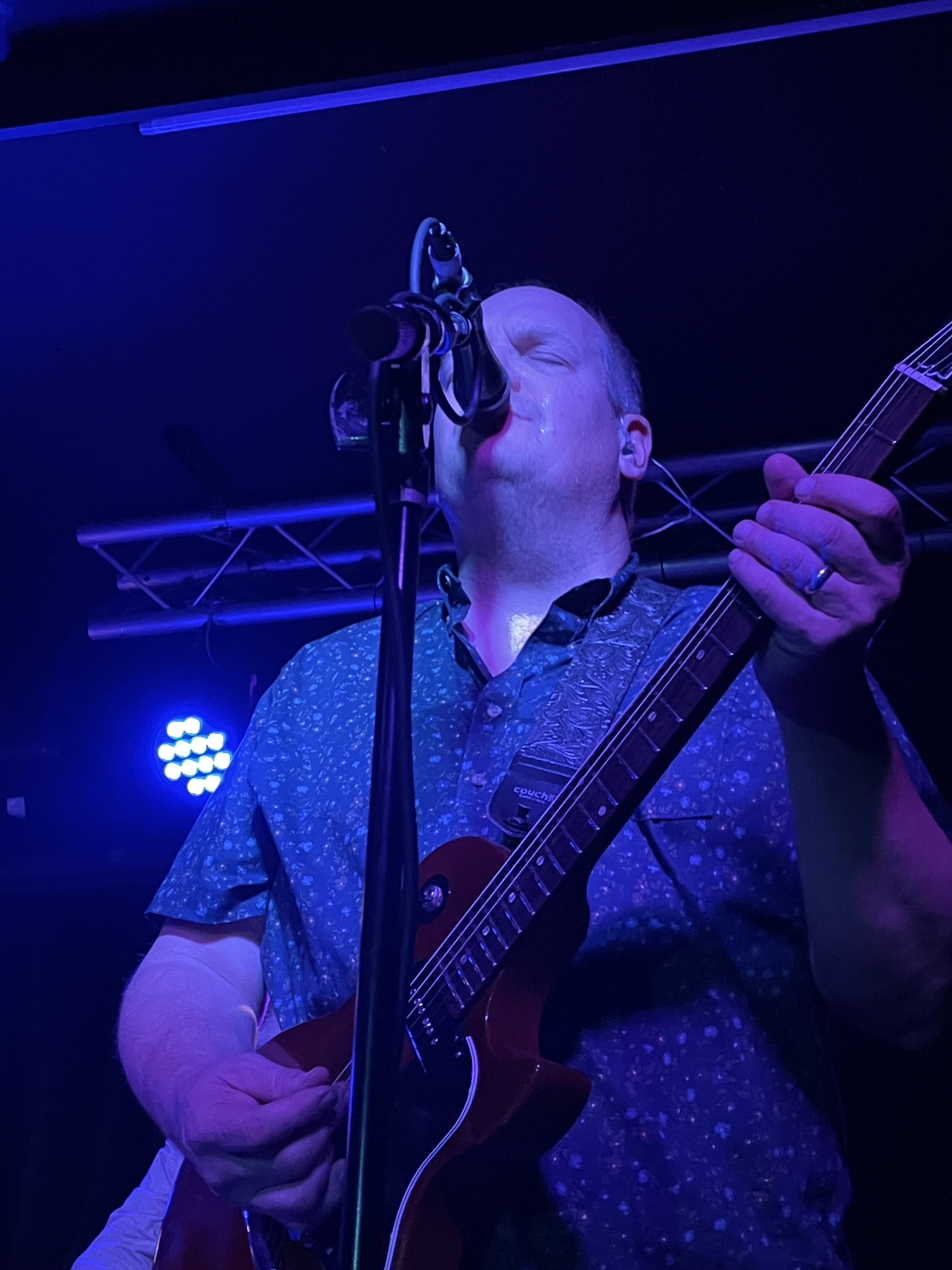
Ted Stevens performing in 2024

== Release history ==
=== With Lullaby for the Working Class ===
- Blanket Warm (1996 · Bar/None Records)
- I Never Even Asked for Light (1997 · Bar/None Records)
- Song (1999 · Bar/None Records)

=== With Cursive ===
- Domestica (2000, Saddle Creek Records)
- Burst and Bloom (2001, Saddle Creek Records)
- 8 Teeth to Eat You (2002, Better Looking Records)
- The Ugly Organ (2003, Saddle Creek Records)
- Happy Hollow (2006, Saddle Creek Records)
- Mama, I'm Swollen (2009, Saddle Creek Records)
- I Am Gemini (2012, Saddle Creek Records)
- Vitrola (2018, 15 Passenger)
- Get Fixed (2019, 15 Passenger)
- Devourer (2024, 15 Passenger)

=== With Mayday ===
- Old Blood (2002 · Saddle Creek Records)
- I Know Your Troubles Been Long (2003 · Bar/None Records [cd], Greyday Records [lp])
- Bushido Karaoke (2005 · Saddle Creek Records)

=== Other ===
- Bright Eyes - A Collection of Songs Written and Recorded 1995–1997 (1998 - Saddle Creek)
- Bright Eyes - Letting off the Happiness (1998 · Saddle Creek records)
- Bright Eyes - Lifted or The Story is in the Soil, Keep Your Ear to the Ground (2002 · Saddle Creek Records)
- Bright Eyes - Cassadaga (2007 · Saddle Creek Records)
- McCarthy Trenching - McCarthy Trenching (2007 - Team Love Records)
