= Mama, I'm Swollen =

Studio album by Cursive
- Released: March 1, 2009
- Recorded: December 2008
- Genres: Emo, indie rock
- Length: 40:47
- Label: Saddle Creek
- Producer: A. J. Mogis

Cursive chronology
Happy Hollow (2006)	Mama, I'm Swollen (2009)	I Am Gemini (2012)

Mama, I'm Swollen is the sixth studio album by the American indie rock band Cursive, on Saddle Creek Records. It was released on March 1, 2009, digitally, March 10 on CD, and was released on LP on May 19, 2009. The entire album was played through as a preview at Subterranean in Chicago on June 27, 2008. On February 24, 2009, the band released "From the Hips" on their website.

== Writing and recording ==
Hired drummer Matt "Cornbread" Compton, formerly of Engine Down, temporarily replaced Clint Schnase for this album. Compton had significant creative input on the album, which, according to frontman Tim Kasher, led to an increased emphasis on groove.

In December 2008, the band announced that they had finished recording and mixing their next album.

Mama, I'm Swollen saw Kasher grappling with aging and dealing with his experiences as he entered his thirties. The songs dwell on various subjects, from egotism ("Mama, I'm Satan") to sexuality ("From the Hips"), but follow a loose narrative which, according to Kasher, concerns "a person trying to break away from his surroundings, only to realize that he is unable to, and comes to no real answer."

== Release ==
In January 2009, the band went on a tour of the US. On February 2, 2009, Mama, I'm Swollen was announced for release the following month; alongside this, its artwork and track listing were posted online. "I Couldn't Love You" was posted online on February 23, 2009, followed by "From the Hips" two days later. On March 1, 2009, the album was released digitally in 320 kbit/s MP3s with a PDF booklet and cover art at the cost of US$1.00, with a one dollar increase in price until its release day. Each CD digipak and 180-gram red vinyl/CD gatefold package order will come with a bonus download card with other songs, demos, and videos. It was supported with a handful of releases shows across the country, with support from Ladyfinger and Little Brazil. The trek also included an appearance at the South by Southwest music conference and a performance of "From the Hips" on Late Show with David Letterman. A music video was released for "From the Hips" on March 30, 2009.

For the 2009 Record Store Day event, the band released a split with Ladyfinger, which featured Cursive's "From the Hips" and "Universal Shrug", while Ladyfinger contributed "Little Things" and "Old News". In April and May 2009, the band went on a US tour with Man Man. They went on a tour of the UK to close out May 2009, before embarking on a US tour until July 2009. Further shows were added, extending the trek into August 2009. During this, a music video was released for "I Couldn't Love You". Kasher said it was a "gross exaggeration of the 'trophy wife' concept -- grooms hunting down brides, hanging wedding pictures over the mantel next to a deer head". They went on a short tour of Japan in October 2009; they closed the year with a US tour in November and December 2009. Between February and April 2010, the band went on a US tour with Alkaline Trio, with support from the Dear & Departed.

== Reception ==
Professional ratings
Aggregate scores
Source	Rating
Metacritic	65/100
Review scores
Source	Rating
AllMusic	3.5/5 stars
Drowned in Sound	(9/10)
Blender	3.5/5 stars
Entertainment Weekly	(C+)
Pitchfork Media	(5.2/10)
PopMatters	(5/10)
Rock Sound	8/10 stars
Rolling Stone	3/5 stars
Slant Magazine	4/5 stars
Tiny Mix Tapes	2.5/5 stars

Initial critical response to Mama, I'm Swollen ranged from mixed to positive reviews. At Metacritic, which assigns a normalized rating out of 100 to reviews from mainstream critics, the album has received an average score of 65, based on 14 reviews.

== Track listing ==
No.	Title	Length
1.	"In the Now"	2:34
2.	"From the Hips"	3:55
3.	"I Couldn't Love You"	3:21
4.	"Donkeys"	3:58
5.	"Caveman"	3:23
6.	"We're Going to Hell"	4:53
7.	"Mama, I'm Satan"	4:28
8.	"Let Me Up"	4:47
9.	"Mama, I'm Swollen"	3:20
10.	"What Have I Done?"	6:11

== Bonus material download card ==
CD and LP versions of the album came with a download card to enable the customer to download five bonus tracks and 14 tour videos not included on the album by going to http://saddle-creek.com/mamaimswollen and entering the code found on the card. The code only works once.

Bonus Tracks

1. "All I Know"
2. "Mama's Baggage"
3. "I Couldn't Love You (demo, alternate lyrics)"
4. "What Have I Done (demo, extra verse, alternate lyrics)"
5. "In the Now (demo, alternate lyrics)"
