= Happy Hollow (album) =

Studio album by Cursive
- Released: August 22, 2006
- Genre: Indie rock
- Length: 45:26
- Label: Saddle Creek
- Producers: Tim Kasher and Mike Mogis

Cursive chronology
The Difference Between Houses and Homes (2005)	Happy Hollow (2006)	Mama, I'm Swollen (2009)

Singles from Happy Hollow
- 1. "Dorothy at Forty" Released: 2006; 2. "Bad Sects" Released: 2007; 3. "Big Bang" Released: 2007

Happy Hollow is the fifth album by the American indie rock band Cursive. It was released on August 22, 2006, on Saddle Creek Records. Saddle Creek Records began shipping pre-orders on August 8, 2006. The album is named after a neighborhood in Omaha, Nebraska.

The album is the first since the departure of cellist Gretta Cohn whose instrumentation was a fixture of the band's 2003 release The Ugly Organ. The album features significant five-piece horn arrangements courtesy of Nate Walcott.

The lyrics of Happy Hollow form a concept album of sorts, revolving around a small town and its inhabitants, and dealing with concepts such as religious dogma and hypocrisy. Guitarist Ted Stevens has stated that album is not an attack on religion but rather "an argument for humanism."

== Music and concept ==
According to Cursive frontman Tim Kasher, Happy Hollow represented a musical point of convergence between the band's earlier sound and that of his side project the Good Life.

The album revolves around a small, upper class, God-fearing town of the same name (the name Happy Hollow coming from the affluent Omaha, NE neighborhood surrounding Happy Hollow Blvd). Each track in the album tells a different story of faults that the inhabitants of Happy Hollow portray that seem at odds with the town's "perfect" image.

"Bad Sects" tells the story of an affair between homosexual Catholic priests, that asks Catholics to re-examine their beliefs regarding homosexuality. The final track, "Hymns for the Heathen," is an afterword of the album, describing the concepts explored in each of the 14 tracks. The album has many biblical references, reflecting on Kasher's Catholic upbringing.

== Release ==
On May 22, 2006, the album's track listing was posted online. Four songs from the forthcoming album were posted on the band's Myspace profile on June 29, 2006. In July 2006, the band went on a headlining tour of the US, with support from Make Believe and LaSalle. "Dorothy at Forty" was released as a single on July 11, 2006; it included the non-album tracks "The Bitter End" and "The Censor". The music video for "Dorothy at Forty" was posted online on August 3, 2006. On August 21, 2006, Happy Hollow was made available for streaming through their Myspace, prior to its release the following day through Saddle Creek Records. In September 2006, the band went on a tour of Japan with the Velvet Teen. Following this, they toured across the US until November 2006, with support from the Thermals, Ladyfinger, Detachment Kit, Chin Up Chin Up, Eastern Youth, the Cops, and Jeremy Enigk. On March 6, 2007, the music video "Big Bang" was posted online. In May 2007, Cursive supported Against Me! and Mastodon on their co-headlining US tour. In October 2007, the band announced that drummer Clint Schnase had left the band to focus on his family. On November 27, 2007, a music video was released for "Bad Sects". In early 2008, the band appeared at the Noise Pop Festival in San Francisco, California. In April 2008, the band went on a tour with Capgun Coup; the trek included performances at Not Brooklyn Fest and Mission Creek Music and Arts Festival.

This album came with a download code to download the songs in mp3 format directly from Saddle Creek Records. Pre-orders of the album came with a miniature license plate that had a code to download a bonus track entitled "No News Is Bad News".

== Reception ==
Professional ratings
Aggregate scores
Source	Rating
Metacritic	78/100
Review scores
Source	Rating
AbsolutePunk	(90%)
Allmusic	4.5/5 stars
Alternative Press	5/5 stars
ARTISTdirect	4/5 stars
Filter	(87%)
Pitchfork	(6.7/10)
Under the Radar	(7/10)

Punknews.org ranked the album at number 17 on their list of the year's 20 best releases.

== Track listing ==
No.	Title	Length
1.	"Opening the Hymnal / Babies"	2:32
2.	"Dorothy at Forty"	3:02
3.	"Big Bang"	3:56
4.	"Bad Sects"	3:39
5.	"Flag and Family"	2:56
6.	"Dorothy Dreams of Tornadoes"	2:54
7.	"Retreat!"	3:57
8.	"The Sunks"	2:53
9.	"At Conception"	2:57
10.	"So-So Gigolo"	3:43
11.	"Bad Science"	2:40
12.	"Into the Fold"	4:16
13.	"Rise Up! Rise Up!"	3:22
14.	"Hymns for the Heathen"	2:39

Pre-order Bonus Track
No.	Title	Length
15.	"No News Is Bad News"	2:08
