= The Ugly Organ =

Studio album by Cursive
- Released: March 4, 2003
- Studio: Presto!
- Genres: Emo; art rock; indie rock; post-punk; post-hardcore
- Length: 40:16
- Label: Saddle Creek
- Producers: Mike Mogis, Tim Kasher

Cursive chronology
Burst and Bloom (2001)	The Ugly Organ (2003)	The Difference Between Houses and Homes (2005)

Singles from The Ugly Organ
- 1. "Art Is Hard" Released: 2003; 2. "The Recluse" Released: 2004

The Ugly Organ is the fourth studio album by American rock band Cursive, released on March 4, 2003, through Saddle Creek Records. It was released both on black and translucent green 180 gram vinyl.

== Background and production ==
Following a brief break-up, Cursive returned with the release of their third studio album Domestica in June 2000. It saw the introduction of new guitarist Ted Stevens, previously of Lullaby for the Working Class; he had replaced Stephen Pederson, who went to university. After this, frontman Tim Kasher formed the Good Life, who released their debut album Novena on a Nocturn in late 2000. In July 2001, Cursive released the Burst and Bloom EP, which featured the addition of cellist Gretta Cohn. The release was used to showcase a new sound for the band, which they expected to expand upon on their next album.

In March and April 2002, Cursive toured across Europe with the Appleseed Cast. Cursive became exhausted while on tour, with Kasher sustaining a collapsed lung in June 2002. As a result of this, the band cancelled the remainder of their tour dates, and began writing new material. The Ugly Organ was recorded at Presto! in Lincoln, Nebraska, with Mike Mogis and Kasher as producers; Mike and his brother AJ Mogis served as engineers. Doug Van Sloun mastered the album at Studio B in Omaha, Nebraska.

== Composition ==
The Ugly Organ is an art rock, indie rock and post-punk album, and has been compared to Pornography (1982) by the Cure and The Flowers of Romance (1981) by Public Image Ltd. It is a three-act concept album about the main character the Ugly Organist as they struggle through love and life. The album's liner notes are written in the vein of a script as stage direction are mentioned next to every song. The album plays as a continuous entity, with interludes and segues between the tracks. In contrast to Domestica, which was written solely by Kasher, Stevens co-wrote some of the material on The Ugly Organ with Kasher. Noel Murray of The A.V. Club suggested that Stevens' prior experience in Lullaby for the Working Class where he worked with "long, multi-part compositions surely helped in shaping The Ugly Organ's complex structure".

Bassist Matt Maginn said the band intentionally "stepped back" in order to "play a broader scope of sounds and style and still sound like Cursive." Mogis struggled with Cohn's cello sitting alongside other instruments, before he realised it would be better used as a counterpart to the guitars and Kasher's vocals. The band were aided by additional musicians: Chris Acker playing trombone on "Art Is Hard" and "A Gentleman Caller"; Jenny Lewis singing additional vocals on "The Recluse", "Bloody Murderer", and "Sierra"; and Mogis contributed vibraphone on "The Recluse", keyboard on "Butcher the Song", bells on "Bloody Murderer", and guitar on "Sierra". "Staying Alive" features a choir consisting of Clark Baechle, Todd Baechle, Julee Dunekacke, Rob Hawkins, Alisa Heinzman, Renee Ledesma Hoover, Alex McManus, AJ Mogis, Conor Oberst, and Sara Wilson.

The album's opening track, "The Ugly Organist", is an ambient prelude, acting as the titular character's theme song. It opens with quiet sounds of conversations, alongside an organ, before ending with a carnival barker. In "Some Red-Handed Sleight of Hand", the character details his worries about making himself a martyr over songs about unrequited love. It opens with Cohn's cello as it synchs up with a distorted guitar part. "Art Is Hard" has Kasher criticize artists who think that art should come from a place of suffering. The first act concludes with "The Recluse", in which the character described being in bed with a woman he barely knows about. Kasher's restrained vocals evoke the sound of whispering in a bedroom, in an attempt not to wake up his companion. "Herald! Frankenstein" is a short mainly instrumental track consisting of a cello and guitars, concluding with one line of lyrics: "I can’t stop the monster I created."

"Butcher the Song", which features timpani, is sung from the perspective of both the Ugly Organist and his previous partner. Kasher discusses the partner, and the way she ended up as the antagonist in his song writing. "Driftwood: A Fairy Tale" is sung as a fairy tale, which sees Pinocchio cast as a boyfriend who walks into water to his death. Cohn's cello earned the track a comparison to the work of Spoon. Kasher recounts a post-sex discussion in "A Gentleman Caller", and is followed by the story of a weatherman in "Harold Weathervain". With "Bloody Murderer", Kasher discusses being a serial killer, while in "Sierra", the Ugly Organist attempts to mend the relationship with a past lover. The closing track, "Staying Alive" is ten minutes long; it begins with guitar and cello parts, eventually leading to white noise and a choir repeating the phrase "the worst is over". Kasher said the song acted as "more of a summary, a solace to what is a difficult record at times and a lot of difficult situations".

== Release ==
In October 2002, the band appeared on the US Plea for Peace Tour. During the trek, the band debuted three new songs, "Some Red-Handed Sleight of Hand", "Art Is Hard", and "A Gentleman Caller". On December 13, 2002, The Ugly Organ was announced for release in early 2003. In January and February 2003, Cursive embarked on a headlining US tour, with support from Race for Titles, Neva Dinova, and the Velvet Teen. "Art Is Hard" was released as a single on January 21, 2003, with "Sinner's Serenade" as an extra track. In February and March, Kasher went on tour with the Good Life; the trek also included Mayday, the side project of Stevens. The Ugly Organ was released on March 4, 2003, through Saddle Creek. The artwork was painted by Kasher, and features broken keys of an organ against a green background. Between March and May 2003, Cursive went on a headlining US tour, with support on various dates from Small Brown Bike, No Knife, Engine Down, Minus the Bear, and the Appleseed Cast. Following this, the band toured across Europe, which ran into June. In September and October, the band went on an east coast tour, with the Blood Brothers, Race for Titles, Eastern Youth, and Fin Fang Foom. In February 2004, the band played a few UK shows with Planes Mistaken for Stars and the Ataris. Coinciding with this, "The Recluse" was released as a single on February 16, 2004, with "Once" and "Adapt" as B-sides. Between April and June 2004, the band toured across the US as part of the Plea for Peace Tour. They supported the Cure on their US tour in July and August 2004. As touring was wrapping up, the band went on hiatus. A 10" picture disc was released in December 2004, with "Art Is Hard", "The Recluse" and their respective B-sides.

The album was re-released on November 24, 2014, as a remastered deluxe edition. It includes four songs from Cursive's split EP with Eastern Youth, 8 Teeth to Eat You; the song "Sinners Serenade" from the Art is Hard EP; the song "Nonsense" which appeared on Saddle Creek 50; and two songs from the EP The Recluse.

== Reception ==
Professional ratings
Aggregate scores
Source	Rating
Metacritic	85/100
Review scores
Source	Rating
AllMusic	3.5/5 stars
Alternative Press	5/5
Blender	4/5 stars
Consequence of Sound	A−
Entertainment Weekly	A−
Mojo	3/5 stars
Pitchfork	7/10
Q	4/5 stars
Rolling Stone	4/5 stars
Uncut	3/5 stars

The Ugly Organ was met with universal acclaim from music critics. At Metacritic, which assigns a normalized rating out of 100 to reviews from mainstream publications, the album received an average score of 85, based on 15 reviews.

Entertainment Weekly said of the album, "Organ raises the Saddle Creek bar in terms of sheer psychiatric-rock intensity". Billboard called it a "challenging, yet highly rewarding listen". Rolling Stone referred to it as a "brilliant leap forward". "The Recluse" appeared on a best-of emo songs list by Vulture.

As of November 2014, The Ugly Organ went on to sell over 170,000 copies.

== Legacy ==
Professional ratings
Review scores
Source	Rating
Consequence	A−
Paste	9.5/10
PopMatters	9/10

The reissue, PopMatters' Adam Finley felt, showed how "cohesive", "carefully sequenced", and "flawlessly arranged [and] executed" the record remained. As well as being "a high-water mark" for Midwestern indie rock, Finley applauded Organ as "a moment of honest clarity" amidst "a notoriously self-mythologizing arena". Dubbing it "a beast of a record", Treble ranked Organ on their list of post-hardcore's essential albums. Alternative Press ranked "Art Is Hard" at number 99 on their list of the best 100 singles from the 2000s.

== Track listing ==
Track listing per booklet.

The Ugly Organ standard track listing
No.	Title	Length
1.	"The Ugly Organist"	0:53
2.	"Some Red-Handed Sleight of Hand"	1:53
3.	"Art Is Hard"	2:46
4.	"The Recluse"	3:04
5.	"Herald! Frankenstein"	0:47
6.	"Butcher the Song"	3:31
7.	"Driftwood: A Fairy Tale"	4:41
8.	"A Gentleman Caller"	3:19
9.	"Harold Weathervein"	2:59
10.	"Bloody Murderer"	2:52
11.	"Sierra"	3:25
12.	"Staying Alive"	10:06

Deluxe edition bonus disc
No.	Title	Length
1.	"Excerpts from Various Notes Strewn Around the Bedroom of April Connolly, Feb 24, 1997 [from "8 Teeth to Eat You]"	04:04
2.	"Am I Not Yours? [from "8 Teeth to Eat You]"	03:25
3.	"Escape Artist [from "8 Teeth to Eat You]"	03:11
4.	"May Flowers [from "8 Teeth to Eat You]"	03:34
5.	"Sinner's Serenade [B-side of the single "Art Is Hard"]"	06:09
6.	"Nonsense [from Saddle Creek 50]"	02:48
7.	"Once [B-side of the single "The Recluse"]"	02:03
8.	"Adapt [B-side of the single "The Recluse"]"	04:06

== Personnel ==
Personnel per booklet.

Cursive

- Gretta Cohn – cello
- Tim Kasher – lead vocals, guitar, organ
- Matt Maginn – bass
- Clint Schnase – drums, percussion
- Ted Stevens – guitar, backing vocals

Additional musicians

- Chris Acker – trombone (tracks 3 and 8)
- Jenny Lewis – additional vocals (tracks 4, 10 and 11)
- Mike Mogis – vibraphone (track 4), keyboard (track 6), bells (track 10), rhythm guitar (track 11)

Production and design

- AJ Mogis – engineer
- Mike Mogis – engineer, producer
- Tim Kasher – producer
- Doug Van Sloun – mastering
- Rob Carlsen – multimedia

The "Staying Alive" Choir

- Clark Baechle
- Todd Baechle
- Julee Dunekacke
- Rob Hawkins
- Alisa Heinzman
- Renee Ledesma Hoover
- Alex McManus
- AJ Mogis
- Conor Oberst
- Sara Wilson
- Katie Torresan
- Lexie Dougan
