= A. J. Mogis =

American guitarist

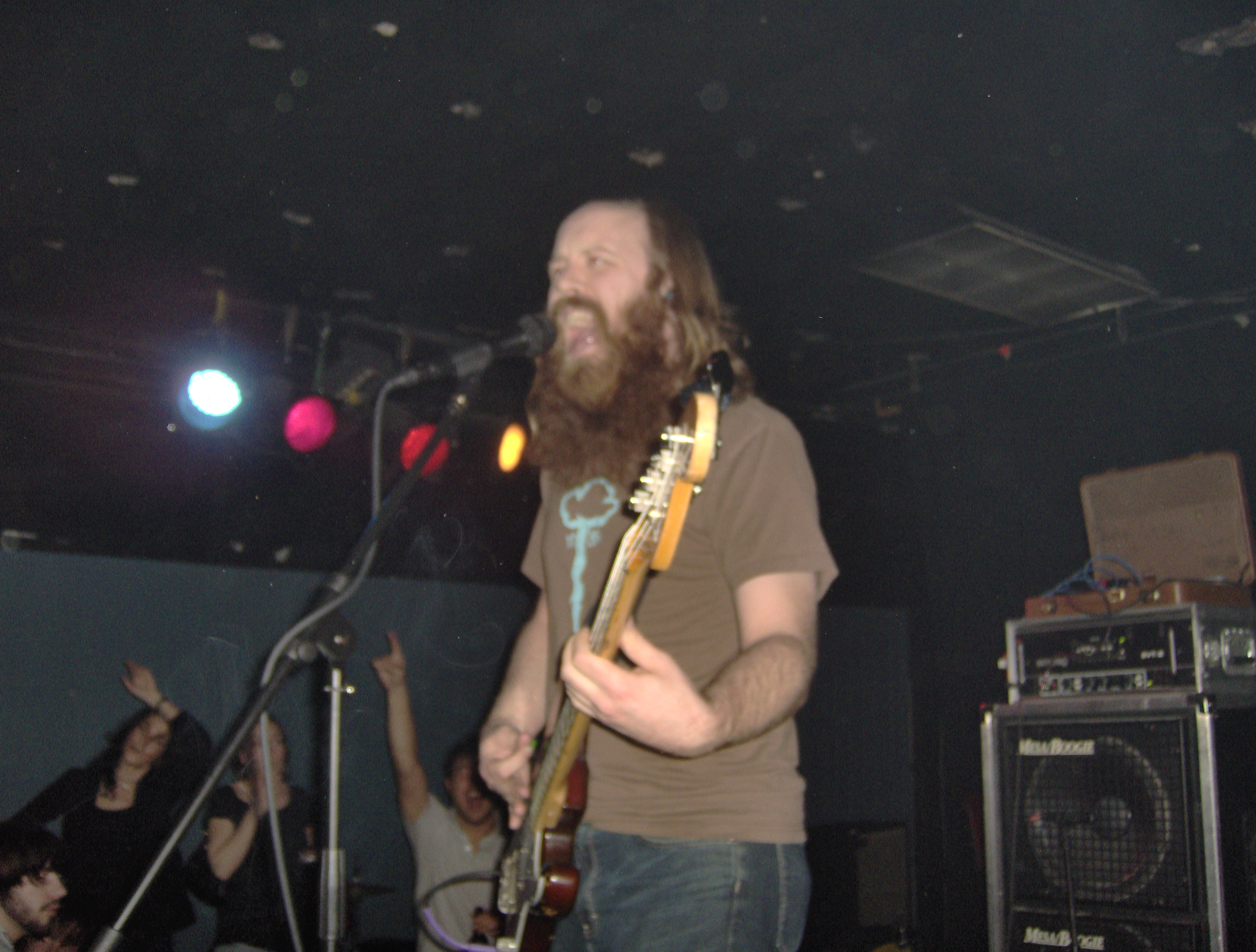
- A.J. Mogis performing with Criteria at Omaha's Sokol Underground in 2006

Background information
- Born: Omaha, Nebraska
- Genres: Indie rock
- Occupation: Musician
- Instrument: Bass guitar

A.J. Mogis is a musician from North Platte, Nebraska. He currently plays bass guitar in the indie-rock band Criteria. His brother is Mike Mogis. Together, they founded Presto! Recording Studios and have recorded almost all the albums released by Saddle Creek Records as well as albums by friends' bands. They were also members of Lullaby for the Working Class. Criteria has so far released two albums.

== Album appearances ==
see also albums by Criteria.

- Inside I [unknown]
- Fun Chicken - I'm Drinking Your Spinal Fluid (1994)
- We'd Rather Be Flying - The Solution for Your Thinning Hair [1995]
- Lullaby for the Working Class - Blanket Warm (1996)
- Cursive - Such Blinding Stars for Starving Eyes (1997, Crank! Records)
- Cursive - The Storms of Early Summer: Semantics of Song (1998, Saddle Creek)
- The Faint - Media (1998 · Saddle Creek Records)
- The Faint - Blank-Wave Arcade (1999 · Saddle Creek Records)
- Lullaby for the Working Class - Song (1999 · Bar None Records)
- Bright Eyes - Fevers and Mirrors (2000 · Saddle Creek Records)
- Cursive - Domestica (2000 · Saddle Creek Records)
- Bright Eyes - Every Day and Every Night (2000 · Saddle Creek Records)
- The Good Life - Novena on a Nocturn (2000 · Better Looking Records)
- The Faint - Danse Macabre (2001 · Saddle Creek Records)
- Criteria - En Garde (2003, Initial Records)
- Cursive - The Ugly Organ (2003, Saddle Creek)
- Beep Beep - Business Casual (2004, Saddle Creek)
- Son, Ambulance - Key (2004, Saddle Creek Records)
- Tilly and the Wall - Wild Like Children (2004 · Team Love Records)
- Criteria - When We Break (2005, Saddle Creek)
- An Iris Pattern - A Museum is Silent Suffering
- Capgun Coup - Brought To You By Nebraskafish (2007, Team Love)
- Son, Ambulance - Someone Else's Déjà Vu (2008, Saddle Creek Records)
- Dirtfedd - The American Nightmare (2008, Sopra Evil Records)
- Mister Vertigo - Dreaming On The Left Side (2016, Vertigo Musik Records)
