= McCarthy Trenching =

American band

- Genres: Country, rock
- Labels: Team Love Records; Slumber Party Records
- Members: Dan McCarthy; James Maakestad; Kevin Donahue
- Website: www.mccarthytrenching.com

McCarthy Trenching is a band from Omaha, Nebraska led by Dan McCarthy. The band has opened for other acts such as Bright Eyes. In 2013 the McCarthy Trenching song "A Keg of Beer and an Accordion" was named one of Music Times' "Best '_________ and Beer' Songs". Covers of songs from the McCarthy Trenching catalogue have included Phoebe Bridgers version of Christmas Song (2018).

== Discography ==
- Old Habits (2003) (demo)
- It's Got Nothing to Do with the Drinking (2006) (demo)
- McCarthy Trenching (2007)
- Calamity Drenching (2008)
- Fresh Blood (2011)
- Plays The Piano (2012)
- More Like It (2015)
- Perfect Game (2020)
- In Front of All These People? (2022) (live)
