= Cursive (band) =

American indie rock band

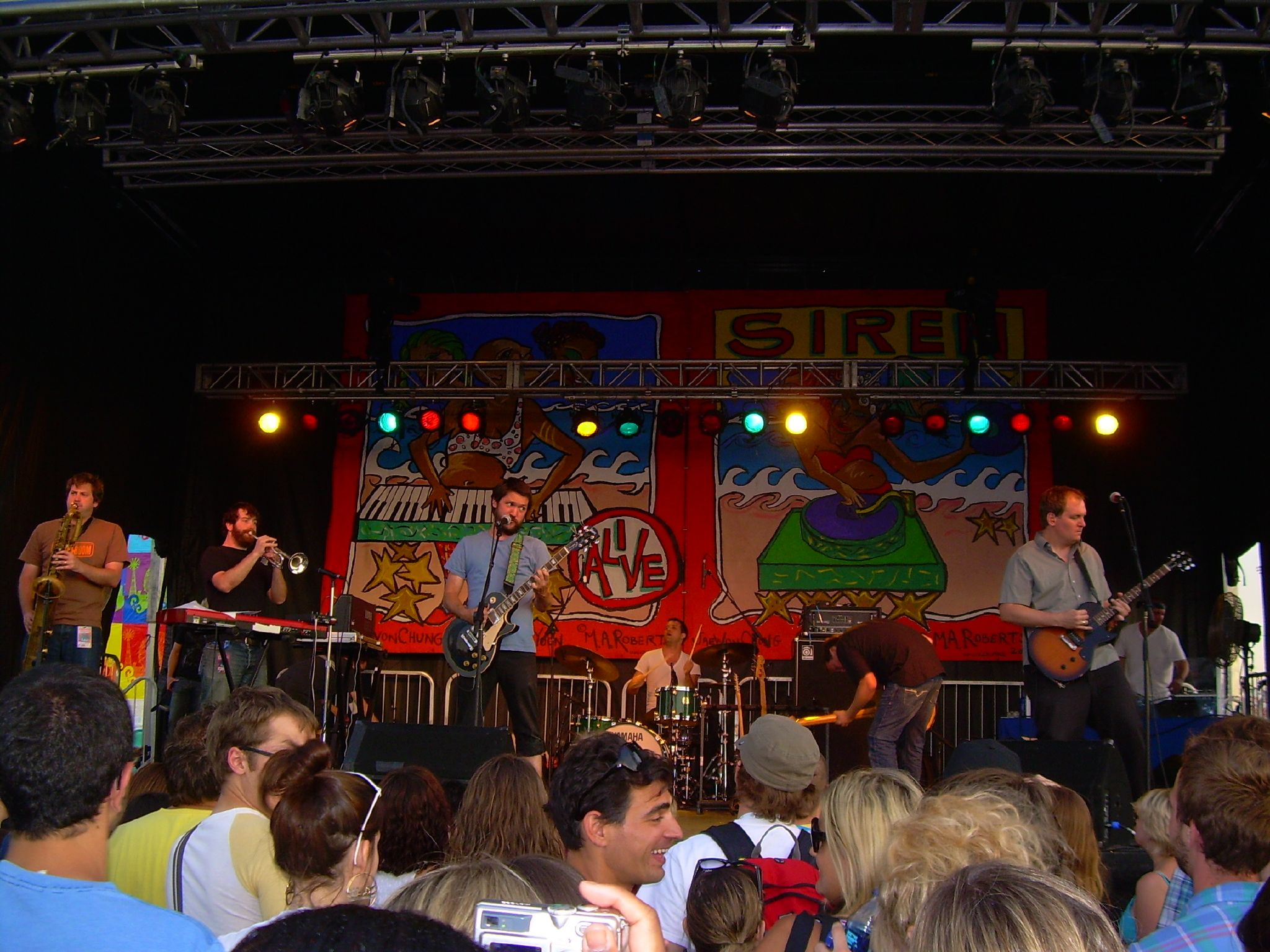
- Cursive performing at the 2007 Siren Music Festival

Background information
- Origin: Omaha, Nebraska, United States
- Genres: Indie rock; emo; post-hardcore
- Years active: 1995–1998, 1999–present
- Labels: Run For Cover; Saddle Creek; Big Scary Monsters; 15 Passenger
- Spinoffs: The Good Life, Criteria, Braces
- Spinoff of: Commander Venus, Lullaby for the Working Class, Slowdown Virginia
- Members: Tim Kasher; Matt Maginn; Ted Stevens; Clint Schnase; Patrick Newberry; Megan Siebe
- Past members: Gretta Cohn; Steve Pedersen; Matt Compton; Cully Symington
- Website: www.cursivearmy.com

Cursive is an American indie rock band from Omaha, Nebraska. Stylistically described as emo and post-hardcore, Cursive came to prominence with 2000's Domestica and found commercial and critical success with 2003's The Ugly Organ. The band has released ten studio albums, a compilations album, and a mix of singles and EPs since 1997. They have released recordings on several labels, including 15 Passenger Records, Saddle Creek Records, and Big Scary Monsters (UK).

== History ==
=== Early years and breakup (1995–98) ===
Cursive formed in the spring of 1995, shortly after Slowdown Virginia broke up. Slowdown Virginia members Tim Kasher (lead vocals, guitar), Matt Maginn (bass), and Steve Pedersen (guitar) had parted ways, along with their drummer, a month prior. The three members decided that they were not ready to give up making music, and wanted to give music a serious try, with Kasher saying, "[we] decided with Cursive we would write the best we could, believe in it, and if everyone ended up hating it – well, we would deal with it." Clint Schnase joined as a drummer, having previously played with Pedersen in a band called Smashmouth (not the other band of that name). Kasher said the band's name was inspired by a passage from a book by V. S. Naipaul, which described English rulers teaching subjugated Indians to learn how to write English in cursive penmanship, which was symbolic of a pointless exercise with no value. Kasher compares this account to the band forcing music on themselves as a discipline, and taking it seriously.

With an initial sound characterized by one reviewer as similar to At the Drive-In, in 1996 Cursive recorded and released The Disruption EP on Lumberjack Records, followed in 1997 by the Sucker and Dry EP on Zero Hour Records and their debut album, Such Blinding Stars for Starving Eyes, on Crank! Records. A follow-up EP, The Icebreaker, was released in early 1998. The Katz brothers of Sputnik Music summarize Such Blinding Stars and Cursive's sound at the time as "11 distortion soaked, emotion ridden songs, comes off as a younger, worse, version of the band's breakthrough Domestica" while AllMusic's Peter D'Angelo said the album "lays down the framework for the Cursive method: delicate guitars that erupt into frenzied explosions, a rhythm section that consistently keeps each track barreling forward, and the harrowing vocal contributions of Tim Kasher."

In late spring of 1998, after several years of touring, Cursive announced they were breaking up. The primary cause was Kasher's marriage and subsequent move with his wife to Portland, Oregon, though guitarist Pedersen was planning on also leaving the band and Omaha to attend law school in North Carolina. Cursive recorded The Storms of Early Summer: Semantics of Song as a swan song in the spring of '98 before disbanding, and released the album post-breakup in the fall of that year on Saddle Creek Records. The Storms of Early Summer was Kasher and Cursive's first foray into writing and recording a concept album, with the first half of the album being themed "Man vs. Nature" and the second half "Man vs. Self". The album was noted for its intricate guitar work, thoughtful lyrics, and the beginnings of a math-rock/pop song structure, all of which would develop more on further Cursive albums.

=== Reformation: Domestica and Burst and Bloom (1999–2002) ===
A little over a year later, in the summer of 1999, the band re-formed when Kasher got divorced and returned to Omaha. With Pedersen gone to law school, Ted Stevens (formerly of Lullaby for the Working Class) joined the band on guitar and vocals. Within a year Cursive recorded and released their third full-length album, Domestica, in 2000. A concept album about the dissolution of a marriage, Domestica gained Cursive critical success for the first time. While not a straightforward autobiographical account of his marriage, Kasher has acknowledged that it heavily influenced the album, though some of the relationship dynamics – such as infidelity – were not autobiographical. Reviewing Domestica, Pitchfork's Taylor Clark gave the album an 8.0/10.0, calling Tim Kasher's style as "the perfect inflection and expression from the far-from-perfect vocal chords, the brains evident behind the guitar brawn" and that the band's sound had evolved since The Storms of Early Summer, saying that Cursive "retained their razor edge, creating pulsing, rapidly evolving guitar-based music, yet they're now fueled and guided by the meaning behind the music".

Cursive added Gretta Cohn as a cellist in 2001, as Kasher felt the addition would help the band evolve its sound. They recorded and released 2001's Burst and Bloom EP on Saddle Creek Records, and split an album with Japanese band Eastern Youth in 2002 called 8 Teeth to Eat You on Better Looking Records. Burst and Bloom's lead-off track, "Sink to the Beat", is a lyrically meta-concept song about the process of recording the EP itself and the effect it has on the music and the listener. Cursive toured extensively throughout 2001 and 2002, to the point of exhaustion and Kasher suffering a collapsed lung. The band had to cancel the rest of the tour and returned to writing new material.

=== The Ugly Organ and hiatus (2003–05) ===
Cursive released The Ugly Organ, their fourth album, in 2003 on Saddle Creek Records to critical and commercial success. Music magazine Rolling Stone gave the album a 4-star rating, while alternative music magazine Alternative Press rated the album a perfect 5 out of 5. At the time of The Ugly Organ's tenth anniversary reissue in 2014, the album had sold over 170,000 records.

The Ugly Organ is a loose concept album about the ideas of what art and music are, how the song, singer, and audience all relate and influence each other, and the emotional effects of the songwriting process on the writer. Kasher stated in an interview with Alternative Press in 2014 that the songs he wrote were not written to be tight conceptually, and credits guitarist and sometimes-vocalist Ted Stevens with finding the theme to the album, saying, "Really, Ted [Stevens, guitar] had a large role in laying the songs out and considering what they all meant and how they related to each other and creating a higher concept from the artwork, of the theatrical layout." The addition of Cohn's cello to the music was noted by Adam Finley of Pop Matters as helping to give songs a "sense of epic scale" and "threatening edge", and that the songs overall sounded as though "all roads led through a haunted house of grotesque situations and twisted characters, each a reflection through a broken carnival mirror of Kasher converting pounds of flesh into something saleable."

After extensive touring to support The Ugly Organ in 2003 and early 2004, Kasher surprised fans and critics by announcing an indefinite hiatus for Cursive in the fall of 2004 once they finished their tour with The Cure. Lead singer and songwriter Tim Kasher took time to focus on his other band, The Good Life, which he had formed in 2000 and whose third release, 2004's Album of the Year, was enjoying critical success. Ted Stevens worked on his other band, Mayday, along with bassist Matt Maginn, releasing their third album, Bushido Karaoke, in 2005. Drummer Clint Schnase along with bassist Matt Maginn toured with Bright Eyes, including 2004's Vote for Change Cellist Gretta Cohn decided to depart the band permanently, relocating to New York City.

Saddle Creek Records put out a Cursive compilation album, The Difference Between Houses and Homes, on August 9, 2005. These songs were collected from The Disruption, Sucker and Dry and The Icebreaker EPs, as well as some b-sides and unreleased material recorded between 1995 and 2001.

=== Happy Hollow and Mama, I'm Swollen (2006–11) ===
Cursive's hiatus ceased in 2006 when Saddle Creek announced that Kasher had temporarily stopped his work on his side project, The Good Life, to start recording Cursive's fifth studio album. Happy Hollow was released on August 22, 2006. Its first single was "Dorothy at Forty", released on July 11, 2006. Named for the Dundee-Happy Hollow Historic District in Omaha, Nebraska, where Warren Buffett lives, with this album Kasher turned his focus away from self-reflective lyrics to concentrate on what he thought were corrupt politics, bland and empty suburban lives, and Christian hypocrisy. The album received generally favorable reviews. Music magazines Spin, URB, Time Out New York, and Blender gave the record a 4 star rating, and Rolling Stone gave the album a 3.5-star rating, while alternative music magazine Alternative Press rated the album a perfect 5 out of 5, saying "Cursive haven't just redefined their sound—they've transcended it." Happy Hollow features a five-piece horn section, adding new texture and redefining the band's sound in place of Cohn's departed cello.

Cursive's sixth album, Mama, I'm Swollen was released on March 10, 2009 on Saddle Creek Records. Three days later, the band made their network television debut on the Late Show with David Letterman, playing "From The Hips". The album was the first recorded without drummer Clint Schnase, who departed the band in October of 2007. Schnase was replaced on drums with Matt "Cornbread" Compton, who had previously been touring with the band. Retaining the horns used on Happy Hollow, Mama, I'm Swollen has a more straightforward rock sound mixed with shifts in keys and time signatures to break up the potential for monotony. Thematically, Mama, I'm Swollen returns to much of the "romantic narcissism" found in Domestica and loses most of the political focus of Happy Hollow, instead concentrating on the futility of adult life and the "worthlessness of humanity, and the Peter Pan Syndrome of adults who want to 'live life duty free' or fuck away their fears." Mama, I'm Swollen failed to garner the critical success of the past few Cursive albums, with a "weighted average" score of 65 on Metacritic, indicating "generally favorable reviews".

=== I Am Gemini (2012–2014) ===
The follow-up to Mama, I'm Swollen, called I Am Gemini, was released on February 21, 2012 on Saddle Creek Records. Cornbread Compton was replaced by Cully Symington prior to recording the album. With a lyric sheet described by Ian Cohen of Pitchfork Media as a "full-blown libretto", I Am Gemini is presented as a play, telling the story of "twin brothers separated at birth, one good and one evil, their unexpected reunion in a house that is not a home ignites a classic struggle for the soul." The album has been characterized as difficult to access musically, with Paste Magazine's Tyler Kain saying "[Cursive's] signature parts are still there with those gnarled, winding guitar parts and Matt Maginn's melodic, grounded bass lines. But the exploration of off-kilter changes, funny time signatures and near-metal breakdowns can make Gemini a hard first listen." I Am Gemini received a similar critical evaluation as Mama, I'm Swollen, scoring a measure of 63 on "weighted average" from Metacritic, or generally favorable reviews.

The Ugly Organ was reissued by Cursive and Saddle Creek in 2014, featuring four additional tracks originally released on 8 Teeth to Eat You and four songs from singles and compilations. Cursive went on a brief tour in the spring of 2014 to support the reissue.

=== 15 Passenger, Vitriola, and Get Fixed (2017–present) ===
Cursive launched their own record label in early 2017, 15 Passenger. The debut release for the label was a new solo album from Kasher, No Resolution. The band reissued their first two albums through 15 Passenger in the fall of 2017, with plans to continue reissuing all of their releases through the label as well as new material. In addition to Cursive's and Kasher's work, 15 Passenger releases material from other artists as well.

In August 2018, Cursive announced their eighth studio album Vitriola. It was also announced that Clint Schnase would be returning to the band in order for previous drummer Symington to focus on recording and touring with Sparta. The album also features contributions from cellist Megan Siebe, who had previously toured alongside Kasher in an acoustic duo mode. This marks the first Cursive album to feature cello since The Ugly Organ. The album's lead single, "Life Savings", was released on the same day.

Get Fixed, the band's ninth studio album, was announced alongside the release of the song "Stranded Satellite" on October 1, 2019. Get Fixed was released digitally on October 11, 2019. Vinyl and compact disc versions were released on January 17, 2020. Songs from the album were primarily written and recorded during the sessions for Vitriola with the intent of releasing a double album. The band ended up planning the songs for a second album, and wrote some new material to accompany the songs recorded during Vitriola. The album's announcement was preceded by the release of the songs "Barricades", "Black Hole Town", and "Marigolds" in September 2019.

== Musical style and influences ==
Cursive's music has been described as indie rock, post-hardcore, emo, and punk rock. Cursive also incorporates elements of post-punk. Their lyrics have been described as "literate" by AllMusic. Cursive's formative influences include such bands as Fugazi, Shudder to Think, Archers of Loaf, Brainiac, and Superchunk. In recent years, the band has also drawn on such influences as the Kinks and Queen.

== Band members ==
Current members

- Tim Kasher – lead vocals, guitars, organ (1995–98, 1999–present)
- Matt Maginn – bass, backing vocals (1995–98, 1999–present)
- Clint Schnase – drums, percussion (1995–98, 1999–2008, 2018–present)
- Pat Oakes – drums, percussion (2018–present; touring)
- Ted Stevens – guitars, backing vocals (1999–present)
- Patrick Newbery – trumpet, percussion, organ, piano, mini moog, keyboards, synthesizers, other instruments (2006–present)
- Megan Siebe – cello (2018–present)

Former members

- Steve Pedersen – guitars, backing vocals (1995–98)
- Gretta Cohn – cello (2001–05)
- Matt "Cornbread" Compton – drums, percussion (2008–09)
- Cully Symington – drums, percussion (2009–18)

== Discography ==
- Such Blinding Stars for Starving Eyes (1997)
- The Storms of Early Summer: Semantics of Song (1998)
- Domestica (2000)
- The Ugly Organ (2003)
- Happy Hollow (2006)
- Mama, I'm Swollen (2009)
- I Am Gemini (2012)
- Vitriola (2018)
- Get Fixed (2019)
- Devourer (2024)
