= Tim Kasher =

American musician

- Tim Kasher performing in the crowd with Cursive at the Concert for Equality

Background information
- Born: August 19, 1974 (age 52); Omaha, Nebraska, US
- Genres: Indie rock, emo, post-hardcore, alternative rock, folk rock
- Instruments: Vocals, accordion, guitar, organ, keyboard, vuvuzela, bass
- Years active: 1993–present
- Label: Saddle Creek

Timothy J. Kasher (born August 19, 1974) is an American musician from Omaha, Nebraska, and is the frontman of indie rock groups Cursive and the Good Life, both of which are on the Omaha-based record label Saddle Creek Records.

== Music ==
=== Slowdown Virginia ===
Slowdown Virginia was formed in Omaha in 1993 by Kasher with Matt Maginn, Steve Pedersen, and Casey Caniglia after the dissolution of a previous band called The March Hares. With a sound described as a heartland Pavement and into the Pixies, Slowdown Virginia recorded and released one album, Dead Space, on Lumberjack Records, with the help of funding from friends. The band was short lived, breaking up in 1995, but it inspired other bands to form in Omaha like The Faint and Bright Eyes, the formation of Saddle Creek Records out of Lumberjack Records, and the name of Omaha's indie music venue, Slowdown.

=== Cursive ===
Kasher, Maginn, and Pedersen formed a new band, Cursive, in 1995, adding Clint Schnase to the band. The bands released two albums, described as full of emotion and distortion, before disbanding in 1998 as Kasher moved to Portland, Oregon, after getting married. Kasher also spent some of this time playing guitar in Commander Venus, recording and releasing two albums. Pedersen left Omaha to study law at Duke University in North Carolina shortly afterward.

Kasher's marriage and time away from Omaha did not last long; he returned within eighteen months of leaving Cursive and Omaha. With Pedersen away, Kasher recruited Ted Stevens to join the previous other band members. The re-formed Cursive soon recorded and released their third album, Domestica, at Presto! Studios in Omaha, using the stock room of the USA Baby store where Kasher worked as the band's practice space. Domestica showed this version of Cursive to have a tight-knit, hard-rock sound with the addition of Stevens as well as Kasher's newfound focus on introspective, storytelling focused lyrics. Cursive added cellist Gretta Cohn for the next several releases and the band, and Kasher's writing, found critical success with 2003's The Ugly Organ, a "gale force" of "personal indigence."

Cohn departed Cursive in 2005, and the band continued on without a cellist. Cursive has subsequently recorded and released three more studio albums, also concept albums - a style that Kasher began loosely with The Storms of Early Summer: Semantics of Song and developed full-blown with Domestica. Cursive's last release was Vitriola in 2018.

=== The Good Life ===
The Good Life was originally planned to be a solo project. Kasher wanted to experiment with different types of lyrics and melodies. He released Novena on a Nocturn under the name the Good Life on Better Looking Records in 2000, five months after Cursive's Domestica. Novena on a Nocturn touched on the same themes of Domestica, mainly ones of divorce and loss, and was noted in reviews for Kashers intense focus on his lyrics and personal storytelling. 2002's Black Out was also a mostly solo effort with friends assisting in the recording, and was released on Saddle Creek Records. As with Novena, the album was noted for its focus on melodies and lyrics, with Dan Ocean of Punk News describing the sound as "a slower paced Cursive with some electronica and an abundance of hooks."

After using the Good Life as essentially a side project, Kasher decided to make the Good Life a full-fledged band. Kasher recruited Ryan Fox, Roger Lewis, and Stefanie Drootin-Senseney and released Album of the Year in 2004. Despite his intention to make the Good Life a band in its own right, Kasher still retained most creative control over the band for much of Album of the Year and similarly for 2007's Help Wanted Nights, described by Pitchfork's Eric Harvey as "two consecutive concept albums dealing with boozers and their second homes."

The Good Life took a break after 2007. Kasher released two albums with Cursive and two solo albums before reconvening the Good Life in late 2013. This time Kasher approached the Good Life with recording the album as a band, with all members contributing to the process of writing the songs. The result was the rock-oriented Everybody's Coming Down, released in September 2015.

=== Solo work ===
His first solo album, The Game of Monogamy, was released to mixed reviews on October 5, 2010, on Saddle Creek Records. Written after Kasher moved from Los Angeles to Montana, Kasher's first truly solo work was noted for its lyricism and instrumentation but also for again repeating on the themes of a broken romance that dominated early releases by the Good Life and Cursive's Domestica. Chris Parker from Alternative Press called the album "overture to middle age and the declining allure of the bars and hook-ups scene." The follow-up EP, Bigamy: More Songs from the Monogamy Sessions, was released in August 2011. Bigamy continues the same themes as Monogamy with seven additional songs.

Adult Film, Kasher's second solo album, was released on Saddle Creek Records in 2013. Featuring a more reserved vocal style and stripped-down instrumentation as compared to The Game of Monogamy, Adult Film's topic touch on mistrust, anxiety, and the fears of adult life.

Kasher's fourth solo album, "Middling Age", was released in April 2022.

== Musical style and influences ==
Pitchfork's Taylor Clark once described Kasher's singing as "perhaps the worst great voice in indie rock," noting his lack of ease in singing with a range and a deficiency in enunciation. His voice is commonly recognized as a signature part of Cursive's sound. Kasher's songwriting receives similar attention, particularly 2003's The Ugly Organ, which took an introspective meta view on the songwriting process itself. For his part, Kasher has said that a lot of the inspiration for grand visions for his solo albums came from David Bowie. Kasher cites Bowie for helping him to "wake me up to, well, you can do whatever you want. I mean, you’re doing a solo record. You can go in absolutely any direction." Even prior to this, Kasher's writing for albums moved more and more towards a screenplay style of writing, to the point of the lyric sheet for I Am Gemini being described by one reviewer as "a full-blown libretto."

== Personal life ==
In 2007, Kasher moved from Omaha to Los Angeles, California. While also working on new music with both Cursive and the Good Life, he took up writing screenplays. In late 2009, he relocated to Montana to focus more explicitly on his writing. He is currently again living in Los Angeles.

He has an undergraduate degree in English, with a minor in Philosophy. He has stated that if he was not pursuing music full-time, he would have become an English professor, teaching writing or literature.

He is the youngest of six children, with four older sisters and one older brother.

In 2015, Kasher married his long-term girlfriend Gwynedd Stuart, the managing editor at Sporked.

In 2017, a feature film No Resolution — written and directed by Kasher starring Maura Kidwell and Layne Manzer — was released. In an interview with The Reader, Kasher said an earlier version premiered at the Omaha Film Festival a year prior in 2016.

== Discography ==
=== Solo albums ===
- The Game of Monogamy (2010, Saddle Creek)
- Bigamy: More Songs from the Monogamy Sessions (2011, Saddle Creek)
- Adult Film (2013, Saddle Creek)
- No Resolution (2017, 15 Passenger)
- Middling Age (2022, 15 Passenger)

=== Other work ===
- Commander Venus – Do You Feel at Home? (1995, Saddle Creek)
- Commander Venus – The Uneventful Vacation (1997, Thick Records)
- Bright Eyes – Every Day and Every Night (1999, Saddle Creek)
- Bright Eyes – Fevers and Mirrors (2000, Saddle Creek)
- Bright Eyes – Lifted or The Story Is in the Soil, Keep Your Ear to the Ground (2002, Saddle Creek)
- Bright Eyes – Noise Floor (2006, Saddle Creek)
- Head of Femur – Ringodom or Proctor (2003, Greyday Productions)
- Rilo Kiley – The Execution of All Things (2003, Saddle Creek Records)
- Planes Mistaken for Stars – Up in Them Guts (2004, No Idea Records)
- Son, Ambulance – Key (2004, Saddle Creek)
- Statistics – Leave Your Name (2004, Jade Tree Records)
- An Iris Pattern -Sod is Gold (2006)
- McCarthy Trenching – McCarthy Trenching (2006, Team Love Records)
- Thursday – Kill the House Lights (2007, Victory Records)
