= Gretta Cohn =

- Genres: Indie rock, emo, post punk
- Occupations: Musician, media executive
- Instruments: Cello, Drums
- Years active: 2001–present
- Label: Saddle Creek Records
- Website: www.grettacohn.com

Gretta Cohn is an American media executive, cellist and drummer who founded Transmitter Media and served as CEO of the podcast network Pushkin Industries.

== Music ==
Cohn played cello in the rock group Cursive from 2001 to 2005. She left the group in August 2005. Her departure was announced on the Cursive website:

Cursive regrets to announce the departure of cellist Gretta Cohn. After four years in the band, Gretta has decided to leave Omaha to pursue other interests and projects, including a potential solo album. The split is very amicable: the band wishes her well and she in turn eagerly anticipates the new Cursive material to come. Cursive will not be seeking a replacement.

She has collaborated with other artists including the band Twin Thousands. She appeared on 2006's Halloween episode of Late Night with Conan O'Brien, performing with Cat Power.

She is currently the drummer in New York based post-punk band Childless and is developing solo cello works.

== Podcasting ==
From 2010 to 2014, Cohn produced the WNYC programs Freakonomics Radio and Soundcheck. In December 2014, she became a senior producer at the podcast company Midroll Media, where she later was executive producer.

In 2017, Cohn founded Transmitter Media, a company specializing in narrative podcasts. In July 2022, Transmitter Media was acquired by Pushkin Industries and Cohn became Pushkin's senior vice president of content production.

In September 2023, Cohn became president of Pushkin as part of a reorganization in which more than 30% of staff were laid off. On January 11, 2024, Cohn was appointed CEO of Pushkin Industries.

== Album appearances ==
=== With Cursive ===
- Burst and Bloom (2001, Saddle Creek)
- 8 Teeth to Eat You (2002, Better Looking Records)
- The Ugly Organ (2003, Saddle Creek)

=== Other ===
- The Faint - Danse Macabre (2001 · Saddle Creek Records)
- The Good Life - Black Out (2002 · Saddle Creek Records)
- Mayday - Old Blood (2002 · Saddle Creek Records)
- Bright Eyes - Lifted or The Story Is in the Soil, Keep Your Ear to the Ground (2002 · Saddle Creek Records)
- Rilo Kiley - The Execution of All Things (2002 · Saddle Creek Records)
- Head of Femur - Ringodom or Proctor (2003 · Greyday Productions)
- Thursday - War All the Time (2003 · Island Records)
- Bright Eyes/Neva Dinova - One Jug of Wine, Two Vessels (2004 · Crank!)
- Tilly and the Wall - Wild Like Children (2004 · Team Love Records)
- Criteria - Prevent the World single (2005 · Saddle Creek Records)
- Maria Taylor - 11:11 (2005 · Saddle Creek Records)
- Bright Eyes - Noise Floor (Rarities: 1998-2005) (2006 · Saddle Creek Records)
- The Guatemalan Handshake - Film Soundtrack
- Twin Thousands - Summer EP (2007, self-released)
- Twin Thousands - Like You A Lot - Single (2007 · Exercise1 Records)

== Trivia ==
- She plays a Yamaha SVC-100 electric cello.
