= Stefanie Drootin =

American musician

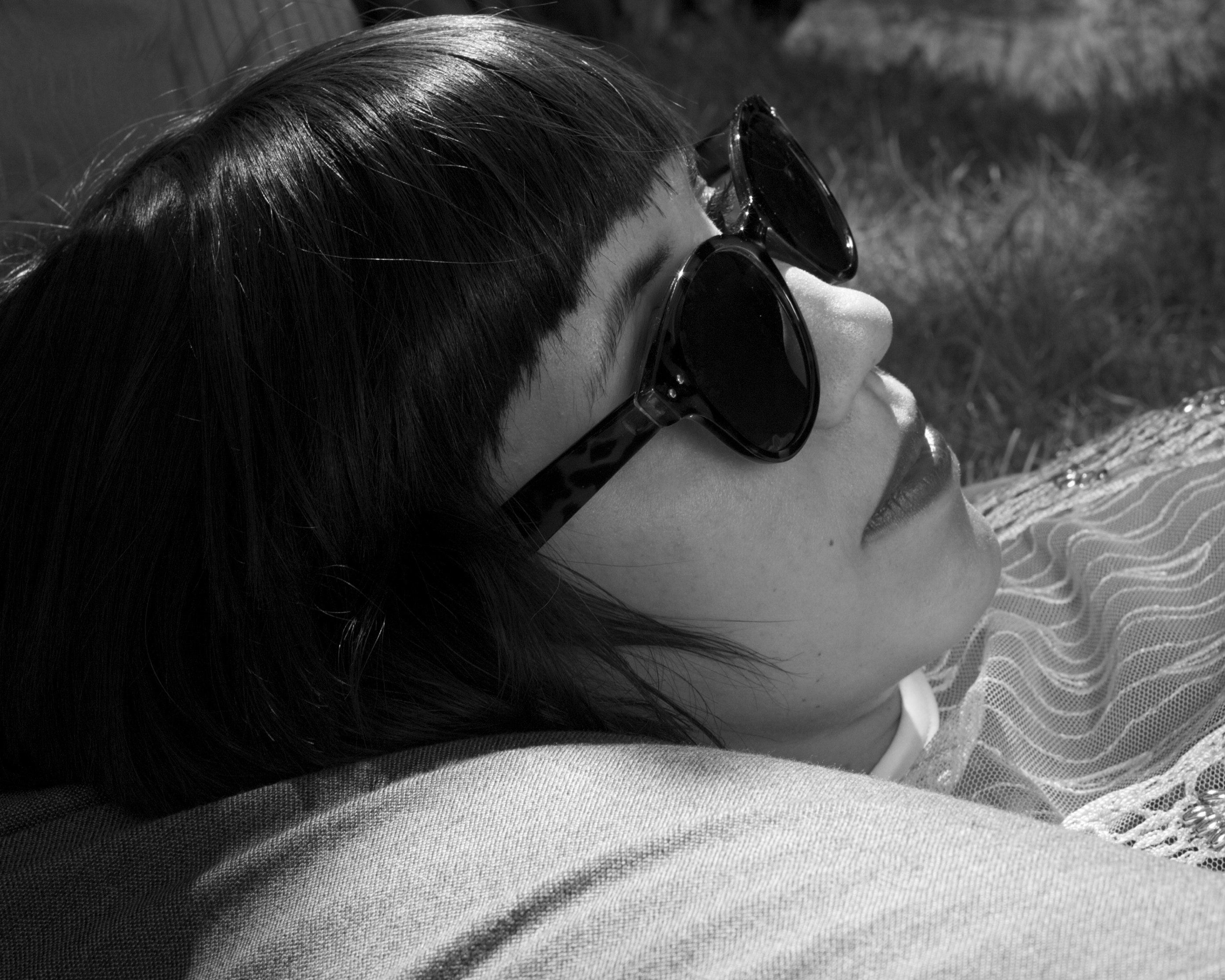
In the garden

Stefanie Drootin is one half of the band Umm and one half of the band Big Harp (band) on Saddle Creek Records. She is also the bass guitarist for the band The Good Life on Saddle Creek Records. Stefanie plays or has played in Bright Eyes, She and Him, M.Ward, McCarthy Trenching, Azure Ray, Orenda Fink and Maria Taylor. She is the sister of Los Angeles-based, Books on Tape.

== Album appearances ==
- Bright Eyes - There Is No Beginning to the Story (2002, Saddle Creek)
- Bright Eyes - Motion Sickness (2005, Team Love)
- Bright Eyes - Cassadaga (2007, Saddle Creek)
- Bright Eyes - A Christmas Album
- The Good Life - Album of the Year
- The Good Life - Lovers Need Lawyers
- The Good Life - Help Wanted Nights
- The Good Life - Everybody's Coming Down
- Big Harp - White Hat
- Big Harp - Chain Letters
- Big Harp - Waveless
- Maria Taylor - Lynn Teeter Flower
- Books on Tape - Dinosaur Dinosaur
