= James Hepler =

American musician (born 1973)

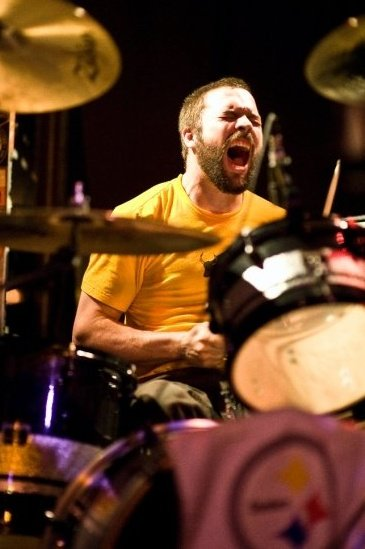
- Photo by Hathir Pfau, ©All Rights Reserved

Background information
- Birth name: James Joseph Hepler
- Also known as: Hepstyle, Hepleriffic, JJH
- Born: October 15, 1973 (age 51)
- Genres: Rock, indie rock, punk rock
- Instrument(s): Drums, bass, vocals
- Labels: Greyday Records, Saddle Creek Records

James Hepler (born October 15, 1973) is an American musician. Associated with several local North Carolina musical groups, Hepler plays several musical instruments and is most recognized for his drumming, playing with the bands I Was Totally Destroying It and Sorry About Dresden.

Hepler is an advocate, contributor, and representative for Cytunes.org, an organization that features music from artists who have contributed tracks to help raise money in memory of Cy Rawls, a close friend, who died October 3, 2008, from a malignant brain tumor. All proceeds from CyTunes are donated to the Preston Robert Tisch Brain Tumor Center at Duke University Medical Center, where Rawls was treated.

Hepler graduated from University of North Carolina at Chapel Hill in 1996 with a degree in communications (radio, TV and film) and Durham Technical Community College in 2005 with a degree in electronics. He currently resides in Durham, North Carolina.

== Personal life ==
Hepler has a relationship with the preparation, presentation and eating of food. He is well known in local circles as a pit master and master chef. He has been featured in two separate cook books; Lost in the Supermarket by Kay Bozich Owens & Lynn Owens and I Like Food, Food Tastes Good by Kara Zuaro. He has also been featured in a few cooking blogs.

== Discography ==
=== Sorry About Dresden ===
- "Sorry About Dresden/The Jagular Drop 7" Split" (2006) – Horn Records
- Let it Rest (2003) – Saddle Creek Records
- The Convenience of Indecision (2001) – Saddle Creek Records
- How the Cold War Began (2001) – Moment Before Impact Records
- Rock School (2001) – Moment Before Impact Records
- The Mayor Will Abdicate (1999) – Route 14 Records
- Saddle Creek 50 (2002 • Saddle Creek)
- Lagniappe: A Saddle Creek Benefit for Hurricane Katrina (2005 • Saddle Creek)

=== I Was Totally Destroying It ===
- I Was Totally Destroying It (2007) – self-released
- Done Waiting EP (2008) – self-released
- The Beached Margin/Done Waiting LP (2009) – Greyday Records
- Horror Vacui (2009) – Greyday Records
- Get Big (Limited Edition 7" single) (2010) – Greyday Records

=== Chamber Corps ===
- Chamber Corps EP (self-released, Internet only)
