= Savannah Drive =

EP by Maria Taylor & Andy LeMaster
- Released: June 17, 2008
- Genre: Folk rock
- Length: 27:35
- Label: Nettwerk Records

Maria Taylor & Andy LeMaster chronology
Lynn Teeter Flower (2007)	Savannah Drive (2008)	LadyLuck (2009)

Savannah Drive is an acoustic album by American musicians Maria Taylor and Andy LeMaster, who had previously both collaborated multiple times on Bright Eyes records. The album was released on June 17, 2008 on Nettwerk Records.

== Track listing ==
1. "Song Beneath the Song" - 3:24
2. "Birmingham 1982" - 3:31
3. "LadyLuck" - 3:40
4. "A Good Start" - 4:34
5. "Leap Year" - 4:31
6. "Time Lapse Lifeline - 4:18
7. "Tell Me" - 3:37

== Trivia ==
All songs but one have been featured on other Maria Taylor albums:

- "Song Beneath the Song", "Birmingham 1982" and "Leap Year" were featured on Taylor's first solo album, 11:11.
- "A Good Start" was also featured on Taylor's previous record, Lynn Teeter Flower.
- "LadyLuck" and "Time Lapse Lifeline" are featured on Taylor's 2009 album, LadyLuck.
