= Something About Knowing =

Studio album by Maria Taylor
- Released: October 29, 2013
- Genre: Folk rock
- Length: 35:40
- Label: Saddle Creek Records
- Producer: Mike Mogis

Maria Taylor chronology
Overlook (2011)	Something About Knowing (2013)	In the Next Life (2016)

Something About Knowing is the fifth album by Maria Taylor, released on October 29, 2013 on Saddle Creek Records. The album finds Taylor returning to working with producer Mike Mogis of Bright Eyes, recording a majority of the record in Omaha and three songs in her hometown of Birmingham. Other collaborations on this record include her brother, multi-instrumentalist Macey Taylor of Conor Oberst and the Mystic Valley Band and Jenny Lewis, mixing by Andy Lemaster, and co-writing and recording two songs with Brad Armstrong of 13 Ghosts.

Paste was the first to premiere a track from the album on September 24, 2013, with a stream of "Up All Night". On October 24, 2013, the album's title track began receiving radio airplay on KCRW and was featured on their website as "Today's Top Tune". "Tunnel Vision" premiered on The Wall Street Journal on October 29, 2013 calling it "an atmospheric song with a rock-solid beat anchoring the gauzy synthesizers that drift past her soft, alluring vocals." "This Is It" premiered on Rolling Stone's website on November 6, 2013.

Alan Tanner directed the video for the album's first single, "Up All Night", which premiered on Under the Radar and features her brother Macey Taylor and Taylor Hollingsworth of Conor Oberst and the Mystic Valley Band. The album's cover art is a photo taken by Taylor's husband, Ryan Dwyer.

== Track listing ==
1. "Folk Song Melody" – 3:07
2. "Up All Night" – 3:15
3. "Tunnel Vision" – 4:43
4. "Sum of Our Lives" – 3:32
5. "You've Got a Way with the Light" – 2:12
6. "Something About Knowing" – 3:52
7. "This Is It" – 4:26
8. "Broken Objects" (13 Ghosts cover) – 2:53
9. "Saturday in June" – 3:54
10. "A Lullaby for You" – 3:53

== Personnel ==
- Maria Taylor - Composer, Drums, Guitar (Acoustic), Keyboards, Mellotron, Percussion, Piano, Primary Artist, Vocals
- Brad Armstrong - Banjo, Composer, Drum Programming, Guitar, Guitar (Acoustic), Guitar (Electric), Organ, Producer, Vocals
- Ryan Dwyer - Photography, Layout, Vocals (Background)
- Daniel Farris - Keyboards, Mixing, Omnichord, Producer
- Andy LeMaster - Mixing
- Mike Mogis Banjo, Composer, Drum Programming, Guitar, Guitar (Acoustic), Guitar (Electric), Guitars, Instrumentation, Keyboards, Mandolin, Mixing, Pedal Steel, Percussion, Producer, Programming, Vibraphone
- Lester Nuby III - Guitar (Electric), Mixing, Producer, Vocals
- Macey Taylor - Bass, Composer, Guitar (Electric), Keyboards, Organ, Percussion, Piano, Standup Bass, Vocals
- Jadon Ulrich - Layout
- Doug Van Sloun - Mastering
