= Now It's Overhead =

US musical group

Now It's Overhead was an indie rock band fronted by singer/songwriter Andy LeMaster and based in Athens, Georgia. Their first album, a self-titled collection of songs LeMaster wrote over a period of two years in the late 1990s, quickly rose from a studio project to a full-time band with the assistance of drummer Clay Leverett, Orenda Fink and Maria Taylor of Azure Ray. They were the first band not hailing from Nebraska to be signed by Omaha-based Saddle Creek Records.

In 2004 they released their sophomore, critically acclaimed album Fall Back Open, which included a duet with Michael Stipe of R.E.M., a long-time supporter of the band. That year, the band also embarked on a US tour as support for R.E.M, who are also from Athens, Georgia.

Now It's Overhead's third album Dark Light Daybreak was released on September 12, 2006. In 2007, they supported Scottish indie-rock band Idlewild on their tour of Great Britain.

== Discography ==
=== Albums ===
- Now It's Overhead (2001) – Saddle Creek Records
- Fall Back Open (2004) – Saddle Creek Records
- Dark Light Daybreak (2006) – Saddle Creek Records

=== Singles & EPs ===
- Wait in a Line (2004) – Saddle Creek Records

=== Compilations ===
- Saddle Creek 50 (2002) – Saddle Creek Records
- Lagniappe: A Saddle Creek Benefit for Hurricane Katrina (2005) – Saddle Creek Records
