= In the Next Life =

Studio album by Maria Taylor
- Released: December 9, 2016
- Recorded: Los Angeles
- Genre: Indie folk
- Label: Flower Moon Records
- Producers: Nik Freitas, Maria Taylor

Maria Taylor chronology
Something About Knowing (2013)	In the Next Life (2016)	Maria Taylor (2019)

Singles from In the Next Life
- 1. "If Only" Released: October 18, 2016

In the Next Life is the sixth studio album by American singer-songwriter Maria Taylor, also a member of Azure Ray. It was released on December 9, 2016, on her label Flower Moon Records. The first single "If Only", features guest vocals by Omaha singer-songwriter Conor Oberst of Bright Eyes.

Stereogum premiered the album's first single "If Only" on October 19, 2016 and Billboard debuted the exclusive premiere of the video shot in Joshua Tree and directed by Liz Bretz. "If Only" was featured during the closing scenes of NBC's fall drama, This Is Us. NPR premiered the full album stream on "First Listen" saying "she's made perhaps her warmest and most affecting album... and filled it with gorgeous, touching songs about family, legacy, fear and the pursuit of contentment." On December 5, "Free Song" was featured as KCRW's "Today's Top Tune." Buzzbands.LA said "In the Next Life's 10 poignant vignettes wrap with the closer "Pretty Scars" (which features Joshua Radin), a musical timeline of Taylor mileposts that's breathtaking in its intimacy.". In their review of the album, Innocent Words said "Taylor has one of the most remarkable singing voices of the last 20 years... One that is more comforting than bombastic, more soulful than aggressive. She is real."

Professional ratings
Review scores
Source	Rating
Paste	7.8
AllMusic	3.5/5 stars
Immortal Reviews	85
ABC News	4/4 stars

== Track listing ==
All tracks are written by Maria Taylor, except where noted.

No.	Title	Writer(s)	Length
1.	"Home"
2.	"Free Song"	Nik Freitas
3.	"If Only" (featuring Conor Oberst)
4.	"There's Only Now"	Taylor; Morgan Nagler
5.	"While the Rest of Me Is Waking Up"
6.	"A Good Life"
7.	"It Will Find Me"
8.	"Just Once"
9.	"Flower Moon"
10.	"Pretty Scars"

== Personnel ==
- Maria Taylor – lead vocals, guitar, piano, drums
- Nik Freitas – guitar, keys, drums, bass, vocals, tambourine
- Macey Taylor – bass, piano, banjo, guitar, vocals
- Tiffany Osborn – violin, viola, glockenspiel
- Conor Oberst – vocals (track: 3)
- Louis Schefano – vocals (tracks: 4 and 9)
- Jake Bellows – guitar and vocals (track: 8)
- Morgan Nagler – vocals (track: 8)
- Mike Bloom – lap steel (track: 7)
- Joshua Radin – vocals (tracks: 7 and 10)
- Ryan Dwyer – vocals (track: 9)

Production

- Nik Freitas – production, recording, engineer, mixing (tracks: 1, 2, 4, 6, 9 and 10)
- Maria Taylor – producer
- Andy LeMaster – mixing (tracks: 3 and 8)
- Mike Bloom – mixing (tracks: 5 and 7)
- Louis Schefano – additional recordings (track: 3, 4, 5, 6, and 9)
