= I Was Totally Destroying It =

American power pop band

- Also known as: IWTDI
- Origin: Chapel Hill, North Carolina, USA
- Genres: Indie Rock, Powerpop
- Years active: 2007–present
- Label: Greyday Records
- Members: Curtis Armstead; John Booker; James Hepler; Rachel Hirsh; Joe Mazzitelli
- Website: iwtdi.com

I Was Totally Destroying It is a five-piece powerpop band from Chapel Hill, North Carolina, featuring current and former members of Saddle Creek band Sorry About Dresden. After self-releasing and touring the country behind their first full-length album, the band signed with Portland-based indie label Greyday Records. Since forming in 2007, the band has toured much of the country, playing with artists such as Conor Oberst and the Mystic Valley Band, Motion City Soundtrack, Cursive, Superchunk, Portastatic, Ryan Ferguson (formerly of No Knife), Dear and the Headlights, Margot & the Nuclear So and So's, Snowden, Billy Bragg, Annuals, Joan Jett, The Actual, Ozma, Polvo and Birds of Avalon. Their next full-length, Horror Vacui, was released by Greyday in October 2009, and was co-produced by Josh Cain of Motion City Soundtrack.

== Formation and beginnings ==
John Booker and James Hepler were in a band called En Garde. En Garde slowly fell apart because band members moved away or chose other bands to prioritize. In 2006/2007 John cam across a band called AOK, which featured Rachel Hirsh and Justin Staple. They joined the band as keyboardist/singer and bassist. At the same time, John found Curtis Armstead from Sanford who was looking to join a band and recruited him to play guitar. Members John Booker and Rachel Hirsh were romantic partners at the time of the group's founding, but broke up after the group's first full-length was released; their sophomore release, Horror Vacui, includes lyrical material inspired by the breakup.

After a while, Justin went to school in Chicago. They recruited Martin Anderson to be the bassist, but things didn't work out. Martin was very busy with his other musical projects, one including being co-owner of Trekky Records, so he and the band parted ways. I Was Totally Destroying It held auditions found Joe Mazzitelli.

The summer of 2008, IWTDI had their first real tour on their own. They did some regional touring before hand, but the summer of 2008 was nationwide. Reviewing one of the band's shows in Denver in 2008, Westword described the band's music as "well within that grand tradition of a scene that produced Let’s Active, Superchunk, Polvo and the Archers of Loaf". The group also did local shows in North Carolina doing entirely covers of other bands' work; they did a night of U2 covers and a night of My Bloody Valentine covers.

Horror Vacui was followed in 2011 by the album Preludes. The group's most recent full-length was 2012's Vexations.

== Awards ==
IWTDI were among The News & Observer's Great 8 of 2008, and also that year made the Onion AV Club's list of memorable band names. The Independent Weekly ranked them as having one of the “Best Songs Of The Year” in 2007, 2008, and 2009. The Daily Tar Heel ranked their album, Horror Vacui, as the second NC album of 2009.

== Band members ==
- Curtis Armstead - Guitar
- John Booker - Vocals, Guitar
- James Hepler - Drums
- Rachel Hirsh - Vocals, Keyboards
- Joe Mazzitelli - Bass

== Discography ==
- I Was Totally Destroying It (2007) - self-released
- Done Waiting EP (2008) - self-released
- The Beached Margin/Done Waiting LP (2009) - Greyday Records
- Horror Vacui (2009) - Greyday Records
- Preludes (2011) - Greyday Records
- Vexations (2012) - Greyday Records
- Blood on the Beach EP (2013) - Greyday Records
