= Louis Schefano =

American singer-songwriter

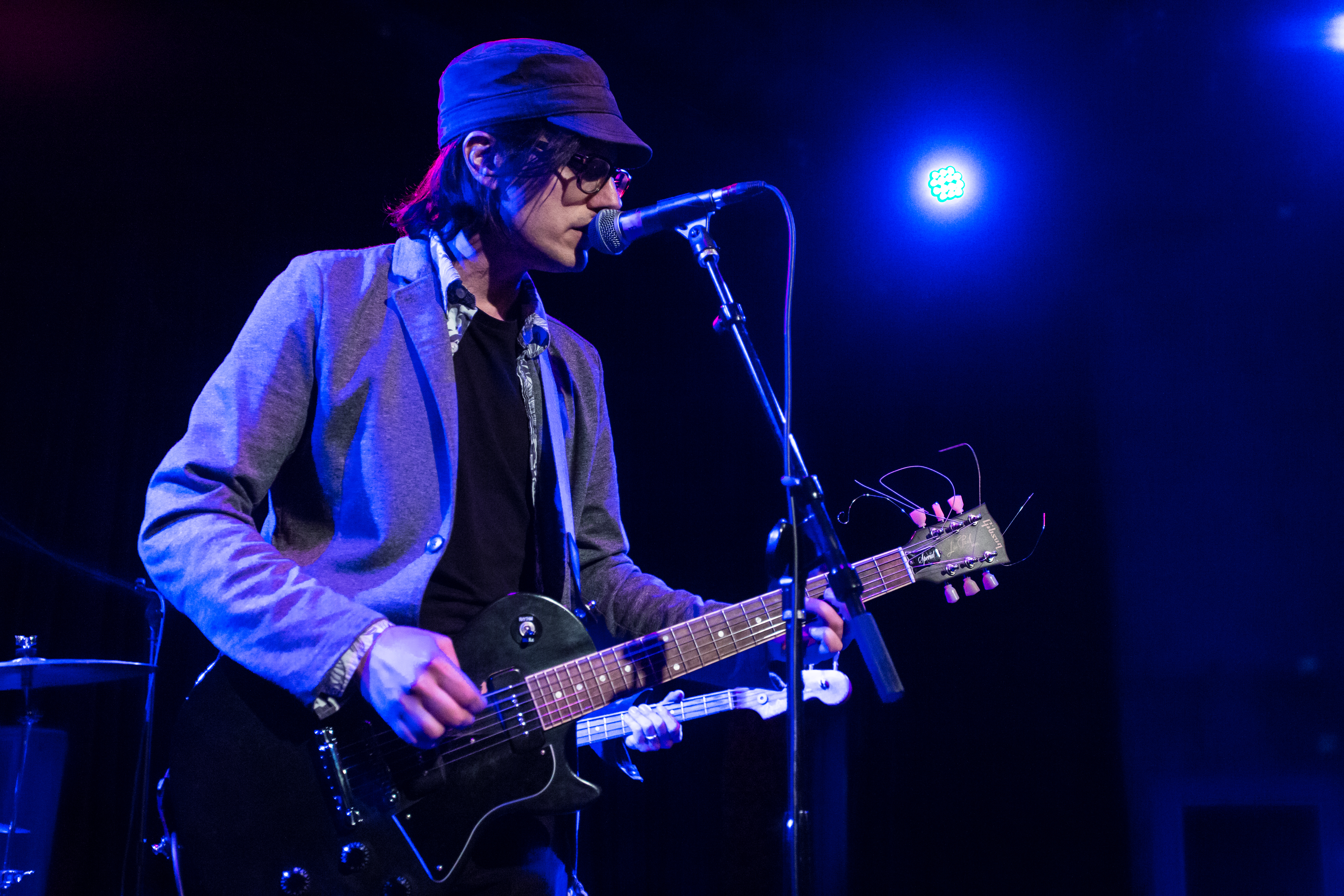

Background information
- Born: January 26, 1970 (age 56); Birmingham, Alabama, United States
- Genres: Alternative rock, indie rock
- Occupations: Singer, songwriter, producer, drummer
- Instruments: Vocals, guitar, drums
- Years active: 1985–present
- Website: louisschefano.com

Louis Schefano (born January 26, 1970) is an American singer-songwriter, producer/engineer and multi-instrumentalist originally from Birmingham, Alabama, United States. He has recorded under various monikers including Regia, Louis, and Suspicious Light. Schefano was also a founding member of Remy Zero and Little Red Rocket (featuring Maria Taylor and Orenda Fink of Azure Ray), and has performed, produced or recorded with Azure Ray, Maria Taylor, Verbena, Cheshires (featuring members of Remy Zero), Bright Eyes, The Ladybug Transistor, and Jaymay.

== Biography ==
Schefano was the original drummer for Remy Zero when they first formed in Birmingham, Alabama in 1990. He later joined Verbena replacing their original drummer, and is featured on the 1996 EP Pilot Park on Merge Records.

Schefano then joined Maria Taylor and Orenda Fink of Azure Ray in Little Red Rocket as their drummer, and also contributed guitar, piano, and vocals to the group's 1997 debut album, Who Did You Pay on Tim/Kerr records. Little Red Rocket was subsequently signed to Geffen Records in 1998.

Regia's The Art of Navigation, Schefano's solo debut, was released in 1999 on spinART Records. The Art of Navigation was co-produced by Shelby Tate of Remy Zero and mixed by Robert Schneider, best known as a producer for his work on Neutral Milk Hotel's critically lauded In the Aeroplane Over the Sea. MTV praised The Art of Navigation as "great sixties-inspired pop" and CMJ New Music Monthly called Schefano an "ace songwriter and lyricist."

Maria Taylor, who was previously romantically linked to Schefano, credits him for teaching her "how to write songs, play drums and find my voice.". Taylor covered several of his songs on her releases including "Nature Song" on her 2005 debut 11:11 and "A Small Part of Me" co-written by Schefano on 2007's Lynn Teeter Flower.

In 2007, Schefano, recording under the name "Louis," released Freak Show Revenge on Superphonic Records. Exclaim! praised the EP as "reminiscent of Elliott Smith, with whimpering vocals that hug gentle guitar slides and strums." That same year he also co-produced, engineered and contributed to Jaymay's debut album Autumn Fallin'. Schefano is also credited with additional recordings on Bright Eyes' 2007 critically acclaimed Cassadaga on Saddle Creek Records.

Maria Taylor again covered Schefano on her third album LadyLuck in 2009 with the song "A Chance". "Louis" released their second effort, a 7" single, "Laura," on Goodnight Records in 2013.

In 2015, Schefano released the single "Burned" as Suspicious Light. Gigwise subsequently called them one of the "10 hottest new bands coming out of NYC." The Deli Magazine referred to their recordings as "melancholic, reverb-soaked, indie-rock" and declared them as March 2015's artist of the month.

Shefano is featured on Maria Taylor's newest record In the Next Life, credited with vocals and additional recordings on several tracks.

On January 6, 2017, Buzzbands.LA premiered the first single "Come to Think" from Schefano's debut self-titled solo LP Opposite Side of the World, released on Maria Taylor's new label, Flower Moon Records. Buzzbands.LA called "Come to Think" "a rhythmically tricky, ’60s-flavored jingle that adroitly buries its cloudy emotions behind a sunny melody." Paste premiered the album's second single "Song for Anthony" on February 2, 2017. PureVolume premiered the video for "Come to Think" on March 7, 2017. "Come to Think" was featured in episode 6 of CBS' Me, Myself & I on October 30, 2017, and also in Freeform's The Fosters.

The hit TV show Pretty Little Liars premiered a new single "Wish Something Would Happen" on during Season 7 Episode 17 on June 6, 2017. PopMatters called Schefano's "smooth melodic urgencies and poignant lyrics" reminiscent of Nirvana and R.E.M.

In April 2018, Paste premiered a new single from Maria Taylor called "Real Life" featuring Schefano, from a compilation released by her label, Flower Moon Records. Schefano's track from the album, "The Future is Now," premiered in May 2018 in LA Weekly, calling it a "sprawling, drawling, epic pop-rock song that sways in and out of layers like a beautiful Pink Floyd/Beatles hybrid."

Schefano was asked to record and co-produce Azure Ray's 2018 EP, Waves, following the band's most recent six-year hiatus. It was released on October 26, 2018, on Taylor's label, Flower Moon Records.

== Discography ==
=== Bands ===
- Remy Zero – Remy Zero (1996, Geffen Records)
- Verbena – Pilot Park (1996, Merge Records)
- Little Red Rocket – Who Did You Pay? (1997, Tim/Kerr)

=== Solo ===
- Regia – The Art of Navigation (1999, spinART Records)
- Louis – Freak Show Revenge (2007, Superphonic Records)
- Louis – Laura/The Numbers 7" (2013, Goodnight Records)
- Suspicious Light – Burned single (2016)
- Louis Schefano – Opposite Side of the World (2017, Flower Moon Records)
- Louis Schefano – Wish Something Would Happen EP (2017, Off World Records)
- Maria Taylor and Louis Schefano – Light of the World single (2017, Flower Moon Records)

=== Compilations ===
- Regia – Happy Happy Birthday To Me Vol. 1 (Happy Happy Birthday to Me Records)
- Regia – Happy Happy Birthday To Me Vol. 5 (Happy Happy Birthday to Me Records)
- Louis Schefano – Flower Moon Records Friends and Family Volume 1 (2018, Flower Moon Records)

=== Other contributions ===
- Maria Taylor – 11:11 (2005, Saddle Creek)
- Bright Eyes – Cassadaga (2007, Saddle Creek)
- Maria Taylor – Lynn Teeter Flower (2007, Saddle Creek)
- Jaymay – Autumn Fallin' (2007, Heavenly Recordings)
- Maria Taylor – LadyLuck (2009, Nettwerk)
- Maria Taylor – In the Next Life (2016, Flower Moon Records)
- Maria Taylor – "Real Life (Trump Era)" – Flower Moon Records Friends and Family Volume 1 (2018, Flower Moon Records)
- Azure Ray – Waves (2018, Flower Moon Records)
