= Saddle Creek 50 =

Compilation album by Various artists
- Released: 2003
- Genre: Rock
- Label: Saddle Creek Records

Professional ratings
Review scores
Source	Rating
AllMusic	4.5/5 stars
Pitchfork	7/10
Exclaim!	

Saddle Creek 50 is a compilation by Saddle Creek Records in honor of being the label's 50th album release. It was released in 2003 and features one album track and one non-album track by each of the bands then recording for the label.

== Track listing ==
=== CD version ===
==== Disc 1 ====
1. The Faint – "Worked Up So Sexual" from Blank-Wave Arcade
2. The Faint – "Take Me to the Hospital"
3. Now It's Overhead – "Wonderful Scar" from their self-titled
4. Now It's Overhead – "Dark Cycle"
5. Rilo Kiley – "With Arms Outstretched" from The Execution of all Things
6. Rilo Kiley – "Jenny, You’re Barely Alive"
7. Cursive – "The Martyr" from Cursive's Domestica
8. Cursive – "Nonsense"
9. Son, Ambulance – "A Book Laid on Its Binding" from Euphemystic
10. Son, Ambulance – "The Moral of Rosa, Parolee"

Enhanced CD content: All 45 of Saddle Creek's online weekly movies from 2002.

==== Disc 2 ====
1. Desaparecidos – "Man and Wife, The Latter (Damaged Goods)" from Read Music/Speak Spanish
2. Desaparecidos – "Popn' Off at the F"
3. The Good Life – "I am an Island" from Black Out
4. The Good Life – "Aftercrash"
5. Azure Ray – "November" from the November EP
6. Azure Ray – "Beautiful Things Can Come From the Dark"
7. Sorry About Dresden – "Sick and Soar" from Let It Rest
8. Sorry About Dresden – "People Have Parties"
9. Mayday – "Captain" from Old Blood
10. Mayday – "Pond Love"
11. Bright Eyes – "Something Vague" from Fevers and Mirrors
12. Bright Eyes – "One Foot In Front of the Other"

=== LP version ===
- Note: Vinyl version only has the 11 new songs – it does not contain the 11 previously released tracks.

==== Side 1 ====
1. The Faint – "Take Me to the Hospital"
2. Now It's Overhead – "Dark Cycle"
3. Rilo Kiley – "Jenny, You’re Barely Alive"
4. Cursive – "Nonsense"
5. Son, Ambulance – "The Moral of Rosa, Parolee"

==== Side 2 ====
1. Desaparecidos – "Popn' Off at the F"
2. The Good Life – "Aftercrash"
3. Azure Ray – "Beautiful Things Can Come From the Dark"
4. Sorry About Dresden – "People Have Parties"
5. Mayday – "Pond Love"
6. Bright Eyes – "One Foot In Front of the Other"

== See also ==
- Lagniappe
