= Lagniappe (album) =

Compilation album by Various artists
- Released: October 25, 2005
- Label: Saddle Creek Records

Professional ratings
Review scores
Source	Rating
Allmusic	3.5/5 stars

Lagniappe is a compilation album released by the Omaha-based record label Saddle Creek, after the events of Hurricane Katrina. It is a benefit album, and all profits from its sale are donated to the Red Cross' relief efforts in New Orleans.

The album is composed of mostly impromptu recordings, thrown together for this purpose. The Saddle Creek website explains it as follows:

Old favorites, new faces, and friends of Saddle Creek recorded these 13 tracks in bedrooms, basements, kitchens, living rooms, and even in a couple of studios. The album was put together in one week. It's a menagerie of mostly new songs, a few tracks that should have made it onto albums but for whatever reason didn't, a couple of B-sides, a demo song – whatever people could contribute.

Most of the then-active bands on Saddle Creek contributed a track, including their most popular bands (The Faint, Bright Eyes) as well as some newer additions to the label (Two Gallants, for example).

== Track listing ==
1. Cursive – "Ten Percent to the Ten Percent"
2. Maria Taylor and Andy LeMaster – "Breathe"
3. Criteria – "Booketa"
4. The Elected – "San Francisco Via Chicago Blues"
5. Broken Spindles – "Move Away (Broken Spindles Remix)"
6. Cocoon (Jake Bellows of Neva Dinova and Todd Fink of The Faint) – "She's a Ghost"
7. Bright Eyes – "Napoleon's Hat"
8. The Faint – "Hypnotised"
9. Orenda Fink – "No Evolution (acoustic)"
10. Mayday – "Footprints"
11. Sorry About Dresden – "Sunrise: Norfolk, Virginia"
12. Two Gallants – "All Your Faithless Loyalties"
13. The Good Life – "New Year's Retribution"

== See also ==
- Lagniappe – meaning of the word
- Saddle Creek 50
