= Fall Back Open =

Studio album by Now It's Overhead
- Released: March 9, 2004
- Genre: Indie rock
- Length: 39:33
- Label: Saddle Creek
- Producer: Andy LeMaster

Now It's Overhead chronology
Now It's Overhead (2001)	Fall Back Open (2004)	Dark Light Daybreak (2006)

Professional ratings
Aggregate scores
Source	Rating
Metacritic	73/100
Review scores
Source	Rating
AllMusic	3/5 stars
Drowned in Sound	8/10
Pitchfork	7.0/10
Rolling Stone	3/5 stars
Stylus Magazine	B+

Fall Back Open is the second album by Athens-based indie rock band Now It's Overhead. It was released March 9, 2004, on Saddle Creek Records.

== Track listing ==
1. "Wait in a Line" – 3:40
2. "Surrender" – 3:37
3. "Profile" – 4:27
4. "Turn & Go" – 3:25
5. "Fall Back Open" – 4:29
6. "The Decision Made Itself" – 3:40
7. "Reverse" – 5:22
8. "Antidote" – 5:26
9. "A Little Consolation" – 6:47
