= Still Life (US band) =

American post-hardcore band

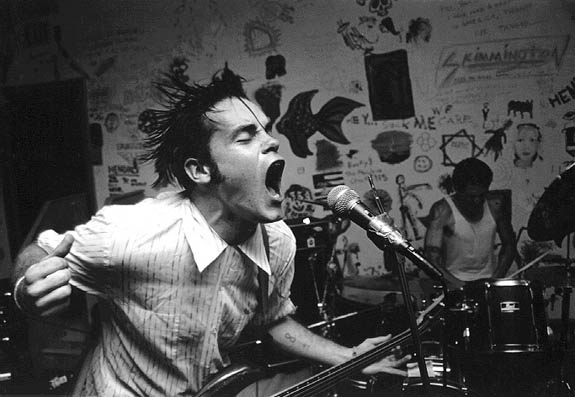
- Still Life performing live in 1996

Background information
- Origin: Moorpark, California, U.S.
- Genres: Emo; post-hardcore; screamo
- Years active: 1989–2003
- Labels: Ebullition; The Sunflower Tribe; Rhetoric; Tree; Greyday Productions
- Spinoffs: Strife; The Old Ground
- Members: Paul Rauch; David Pitzel; Chris Pitzel
- Past members: Adam Callaway; Matt Henderson; Rick Rodney

Still Life was an American post-hardcore band from Moorpark, California (later residing in the San Fernando Valley), that was active from 1989 to 2003. Widely credited with helping pioneer the first wave of emo, they initially formed in the late 1980s under the name Monster Club. However, the band renamed to Still Life in 1991 following the departure of their original vocalist, Rick Rodney, who left to form the hardcore punk outfit Strife. The band's final lineup consisted of Paul Rauch on vocals/guitar, David Pitzel on vocals/bass, and Chris Pitzel on drums. With their existence lasting over a decade long and a discography spanning multiple full-length albums and EPs, Still Life are often referred to as one of the most influential emo bands ever.

In 2003, all of the band's instruments were stolen from drummer Chris Pitzel's truck that had been parked on the street in front of their home after a live show. The incident ultimately coincided with their decision to disband, and they released their final album, The Incredible Sinking Feeling... later that year. Members Paul Rauch and David Pitzel formed a new band called The Old Ground shortly after, continuing to use Still Life's own record label, The Sunflower Tribe, to release new music.

== Band members ==
=== Final lineup ===
- Paul Rauch - vocals, guitar (1989–2003)
- David Pitzel - vocals, bass (1989–2003)
- Chris Pitzel - drums (1995–2003)

=== Past members ===
- Adam Callaway - drums (1989–1995)
- Matt Henderson - guitar (1997)
- Rick Rodney - vocals (1989–1990)

== Discography ==
=== Studio albums ===
- From Angry Heads With Skyward Eyes (1993, Ebullition)
- Still Life / Jara (1995, The Sunflower Tribe)
- Still Life / Resin (1997, The Sunflower Tribe)
- Madness And The Gackle... (1998, The Sunflower Tribe)
- The Incredible Sinking Feeling... (2003, Greyday)

=== Extended plays ===
- Still Life / Evergreen (1993, Anomaly)
- Still Life (1994, Rhetoric)
- Slow Children At Play (1994, Rhetoric)
- Still Life / Cerberus Shoal - Post Marked Stamps No. 2 (1996, Tree)
- Limitations Boundaries And Failures (2002, Greyday)

=== Demos ===
- Still Life (1991, Self-released)

=== Compilation albums ===
- Slow Children At Play And Beyond (1999, Rhetoric & The Sunflower Tribe)
