= Overlook (album) =

Studio album by Maria Taylor
- Released: August 16, 2011
- Genre: Folk rock
- Length: 32:27
- Label: Saddle Creek Records
- Producer: Maria Taylor

Maria Taylor chronology
LadyLuck (2009)	Overlook (2011)	Something About Knowing (2013)

Overlook is the fourth album by Maria Taylor, released on August 16, 2011, on Saddle Creek Records. After moving back to her hometown of Birmingham, Taylor was unable to write for nearly a year, eventually composing the entire album over two weeks during a break in touring with Azure Ray. This release marks the first time Taylor produced her own album. Overlook was engineered by Birmingham musician Les Nuby, who also played drums and guitar, and also features her brother Macey Taylor of Conor Oberst and the Mystic Valley Band on bass, banjo, organ and keyboards and Browan Lollar of St. Paul and The Broken Bones on guitar.

On May 12, 2011, Saddle Creek announced the upcoming release of Overlook and that Taylor would be supporting Jason Isbell on a full U.S. tour. Paste called Overlook "her best, most animated collection in years." AbsolutePunk rated the album 8.6/10. The album's second single "Matador" premiered on MTV's "Hive" on July 11, 2011. The video for "Matador," featuring 15 musicians performing around a fire, premiered on Paste on November 21, 2011. "Like it Does" was featured in an episode of the ABC sitcom, Suburgatory. "Matador" was also featured in the opening scene of an episode of the CBS sitcom, Unforgettable.

Professional ratings
Aggregate scores
Source	Rating
Metacritic	58/100
Review scores
Source	Rating
AbsolutePunk	8.6
AllMusic	4/5 stars
Paste	7.9
Under the Radar	5/10 stars

== Track listing ==
1. "Masterplan" – 4:39
2. "Matador" – 4:20
3. "Happenstance" – 2:43
4. "Like It Does" – 4:04
5. "Bad Idea?" – 3:43
6. "Idle Mind" – 3:00
7. "In A Bad Way" – 4:05
8. "This Could Take a Lifetime" – 3:39
9. "Along for the Ride" – 2:16
