= Alan Tanner =

American film director

Alan Tanner is a music video and short film director based in Los Angeles, California. Originally from Orange Park, Florida, he directed the "weekly movies" for the Saddle Creek Records website. Tanner also played guitar for Saddle Creek recording artist Maria Taylor.

== Music videos ==
- "I'm Cured" by Aimee Mann (2776 Album)
- "Up All Night" by Maria Taylor (Saddle Creek)
- "My Heart Belongs To You" by Johnathan Rice (SQE)
- "Wake Your Mind" by Cosmic Gate (Black Hole Recordings)
- "Bug" by Wavves (Ghost Ramp)
- "Conversations Missed" by Benny Marchant
- "Numbers Don't Lie" by The Mynabirds (Saddle Creek)
- "Wicked Blood" by Sea Wolf (band) (Dangerbird)
- "See Fernando" by Jenny Lewis (Warner Brothers)
- "Never Had Nobody Like You" by M. Ward (Merge)
- "Time Lapse Lifeline" by Maria Taylor (Nettwerk)
- "Souled Out" by Conor Oberst and the Mystic Valley Band (Merge)
- "Pot Kettle Black" by Tilly and the Wall (Team Love)
- "Heartbroke" by The Good Life (Saddle Creek) Co-Directed
- "Rainbows in the Dark" by Tilly and the Wall (Team Love) Co-Edited
