= Lovers (band) =

Indie electropop group from Portland, Oregon

- Origin: Athens, Georgia and Portland, Oregon
- Genres: singer-songwriter, indie folk, electropop, folktronica
- Years active: 2001–2014 (hiatus)
- Labels: Orange Twin, Pop Heart/ Able Hearts Records, Badman Recording Co
- Members: Carolyn "Cubby" Berk (vocals); Kerby Ferris (keyboard/synths); Emily Kingan (percussion)

Lovers was an indie musical group founded in Athens, Georgia and later based in Portland, Oregon. Originally a singer-songwriter project, Lovers later became an electropop trio consisting of Carolyn "Cubby" Berk, Kerby Ferris, and Emily Kingan.

== History ==
=== Beginnings (2001–2002) ===
While studying art at the University of Georgia in Athens, Georgia, Carolyn "Cubby" Berk founded Lovers as an acoustic singer-songwriter project in 2001. Initially, Berk had started writing songs as a way to cope with the death of her mother.

In 2002, Berk released her debut album, Starlit Sunken Ship, on Orange Twin Records. Many of the songs are about her family, and the song "Winter Takes a Lover" became a fan favorite. The Stranger called the album "criminally overlooked", while Exclaim! wrote that it was "delicate and powerful" and would cause a "delightful sense of unease that will creep under your skin".

As Berk started performing locally, she struggled with stage fright and has credited advice from Vic Chestnutt with helping her overcome it. That year, Berk almost died and her instruments were destroyed after her van exploded on tour.

=== The Gutter and the Garden, Sleep with Heat, and I Am the West (2004–2009) ===
Compared to Lovers' debut, the music on The Gutter and the Garden (2004) had a somewhat more optimistic tone, with Portland Mercury calling it "slightly less spirit crushing" and The Stranger noting "a peppering of conditional optimism". Another reviewer characterized the album as "magical".

In 2006, Lovers performed at SXSW as part of the Orange Twin Records showcase; Pitchfork referred to Lovers as "Carolyn Berk's heartfelt bedroom-pop project."

Lovers next album, Sleep with Heat (2007), was called Berk's "first consistently solid set of songs" and features musicians from Phosphorescent and Parker and Lily. A theme throughout the album is constant travel and "the emotional labor of perpetual goodbyes".

In 2008, Berk contributed vocals to the song "Tremolo" on the Pacific UV album Longplay 2.

For a while, Berk was based in Boston, Massachusetts before moving to Portland, Oregon around 2005. Berk named I Am the West (2009) for her relocation to Portland. The album follows a romantic relationship from beginning to end. She collaborated with producer Suny Lyons on the project and played most of the instruments herself. They recorded two different versions of the album because the first version was "timid". Stylistically, Berk moved away from the singer-songwriter genre towards pop. In an interview with Portland Mercury, Berk stated: "I decided that I wanted to bring a different energy to a room; I wanted to bring more joy to wherever I was traveling." She also stated that the album reflected a shift between the sadness of her 20s and the optimism of her 30s.

=== Lovers the trio and Dark Light (2009–2010) ===
From the early days of Lovers, Berk collaborated with numerous musicians in her performances and recordings, such that one interviewer noted that Lovers "seems to be in pretty constant flux." By 2009, Berk was performing with two different line-ups: one played music in Lovers' original acoustic-based style and the other played a more electropop style. Ultimately, Berk decided to move forward with the latter version of Lovers, which featured Kerby Ferris on keyboards/synths and Emily Kingan on percussion.

Their first album as a trio was Dark Light, released in October 2010. Written and recorded over 3 months, the album included a re-recording of "Peppermint", a song from Lovers' first album. The band decided not to heavily feature the guitar on Dark Light even though Berk had used it in her songwriting process.

Despite the album's electropop sound, the music still reflects Berk's singer-songwriter roots, and the album was called "an admirable attempt at melding genres". It was played on college radio stations such as KSPC, where it was the top-played album for a week in November 2010. qPDX.com ranked the album No. 1 Best Gay Album of 2010, and Meme Magazine rated it 5 stars, calling it "an exercise in understated brilliance". To support the album, Lovers embarked on a national tour and recorded a live session at KEXP-FM, including 4 songs from Dark Light.

=== I Was the East and A Friend in the World (2011–2013) ===
In 2011, Willamette Week ranked Lovers No. 7 on its list of Portland's Best New Bands. Later that year, Lovers released I Was the East, a digital-only collection of alternate versions and unreleased songs. Originally recorded in 2006, many of the songs were reworked into I Am the West.

In April 2012, Lovers performed with Tender Forever at the Keep Portland Weird festival at the Centre Pompidou. Berk later referred to this as her favorite performance.

Lovers performed at the Michigan Womyn's Music Festival (MWMF) in 2011 and 2013. In 2013, several artists pulled out of the festival because of its policy of excluding trans women. Lovers expressed their opposition to the policy but decided to perform anyway. They posted a statement on Facebook arguing that "MWMF responds not to external, but internal pressure, and we believe that ultimately, the women who attend the festival are the ones who will decide it's [sic] future." During their set, Ferris made a statement in support of allowing trans women to attend the festival. Afterwards, there were calls to boycott musicians who had performed there.

Soon after recording for Dark Light was finished, Berk began writing songs for Lovers' seventh album, A Friend in the World. By April 2013, Lovers had begun working daily on the album. Recording started a month later at Type Foundry Studios in Portland. The album was mostly self-produced, but Andy LeMaster assisted with mixing. Released in September 2013, the album's title comes from the band's experiences touring and meeting fans in various places throughout the world. Berk called it "a love album". Reviewers said that the album was "understated", "minimalist", and "gentler" compared to Dark Light. Lovers toured extensively in Fall 2013, throughout the US and Europe.

=== Hiatus ===
Lovers has been on hiatus as of 2014. Since then, Kingan and Ferris have been involved with other musical projects and worked as software engineers. Additionally, Kingan has continued working as an accountant through her business, Math LLC.

== Style and Image ==
=== Musical Style ===
Before 2009, Lovers' musical style was described as singer-songwriter and indie-folk and was compared to Conor Oberst. Later, their music was described as electropop and folktronica. One reviewer wrote: "Lovers is a delightful case of an acoustic artist who took the trip to Electro-land and lived to tell the tale." Another reviewer said that Lovers' "forlorn solo folk-pop project [...] coalesced into a meaty synth-driven three-piece".

Berk's lyrics have been praised for their poetry and quality and noted for their sadness. Once Lovers became a trio, Berk would write songs on the acoustic guitar and collaborate with Kingan and Ferris to turn them into electropop. Some Lovers songs have been described as having sad lyrics but danceable music.

The members of Lovers have been influenced and inspired by various musicians. Berk has cited Sinéad O'Connor, Jay-Z, Bon Iver, Kathleen Hanna, Frank Ocean, Conor Oberst, and others as influences. Kingan has been inspired by Team Dresch, Bikini Kill, Heavens to Betsy, and The Third Sex, while Ferris's influences include Team Dresch, Ani DiFranco, Sleater-Kinney, Indigo Girls, Arthur Russell, and Sylvester.

=== Queer Identity ===
Lovers' queer identities were an important part of their music. Sleep with Heat (2007) includes a song called "An Army of Lovers Cannot Fail", a phrase used by the Gay liberation movement and Rita Mae Brown. The song "Figure 8" from Dark Light (2010) is a gay anthem. Berk stated that it was about: "my interest to be a happy, proud, unapologetic, queer woman artist living in the now."

Reviewers and interviewers frequently highlighted their queer identities and compared them to Tegan and Sara. They have been called "three dykes" and "loud and proud queercore" and have cited queer musicians including those involved with the Riot grrrl movement as influences. They were covered in queer publications including The Advocate, Curve, Bay Windows, AfterEllen, qPDX.com, and Dallas Voice.

Their queer identities were expressed through their physical appearances, including hairstyles, facial hair, and clothing. Ferris stated: "You just sort of roll out of bed making a statement. I don't think we have to put much effort into explaining that something...queer is going on here."

=== DIY ===
Lovers exhibited a DIY, homemade ethos. They arranged tours, travel, and accommodation on their own, often staying in people's homes rather than booking hotels. They credited the internet with their success in organizing tours and gaining fans. Without much formal training as musicians, they learned through trial and error. In an interview with Bitch, Kingan stated: "I'm resigned to be self-made. I've resigned myself to be the do-er and the maker of the things I want to do and make."

Once called "indie darlings" and "an underground band with digital global reach", Lovers never had mainstream success. When asked about whether they were interested in it, Berk responded: "I don't feel physically capable of it. [...] We would love to have more opportunities, but we're pretty stubborn—not stubborn, but we're weird."

== Discography ==
=== Albums ===
- 2002: Starlit Sunken Ship (Orange Twin)
- 2004: The Gutter and the Garden (Orange Twin)
- 2007: Sleep With Heat (Orange Twin)
- 2009: I am the West (Pop Heart/ Able Hearts Records)
- 2010: Dark Light (Badman Recording Co)
- 2011: I was the East (Badman Recording Co)
- 2013: A Friend in the World (Badman Recording Co)

=== Compilations / Contributions ===
- 2002: "Ginger" on Orange Twin Records Sampler (Orange Twin)
- 2006: "Honea" on The Sound the Hare Heard (Kill Rock Stars)
- 2008: Berk contributed vocals to the song "Tremolo" on the Pacific UV album Longplay 2.

=== Music Videos ===
- "Tonight", directed by Yvette Choy
- "Igloos for Ojos", directed by Padraic O'Meara
- "Tiger Square"
- "Girl in the Grass", directed by Sini Anderson
- "Girl in the Grass (acoustic)", directed by Christopher Coates

== Other Media ==
- 2009–2011: Kingan and Berk created a series of videos called "Man Times" that were posted to YouTube.
- 2011: Lovers music was featured in The Real L Word Season 2.
- 2012: The song "Igloos for Ojos" was featured in Revenge Season 1, Episode 17.
- 2013: Lyrics from the song "Winter Takes a Lover" were quoted in the graphic novel Calling Dr. Laura by Nicole Georges
