= 8 Teeth to Eat You =

EP by Cursive and Eastern Youth
- Released: June 4, 2002
- Recorded: at King Records Sekiguchidai Studio and Presto! Recording Studios
- Genre: Indie rock, emo
- Length: 34:14
- Label: Better Looking Records / Five One Inc.

Professional ratings
Review scores
Source	Rating
Punknews.org	4.5/5 stars

8 Teeth to Eat You is a split EP between Cursive and the Japanese punk band Eastern Youth. It was released on June 4, 2002. Cursive's half of the EP was subsequently re-released as part of the remastered deluxe edition of The Ugly Organ.

== Track listing ==
No.	Title	{{{extra_column}}}	Length
1.	"Excerpts From Various Notes Strewn Around The Bedroom of April Connolly, Feb. 24, 1997" (MP3)	Cursive	4:03
2.	"Am I Not Yours?"	Cursive	3:25
3.	"Escape Artist"	Cursive	3:11
4.	"May Flowers"	Cursive	3:36
5.	"Bura Bura Bushi" ((Stroll Tune) Translated lyrics)	Eastern Youth	4:57
6.	"Muyohnosuke" ((Useless Man) Translated lyrics MP3)	Eastern Youth	4:10
7.	"Nisokuhokohkouta" ((Bipedality Song) Translated lyrics)	Eastern Youth	5:51
8.	"Itsudemo Kokoniiru" ((I Am Always Here) Translated lyrics)	Eastern Youth	5:01

== Personnel ==
=== Cursive ===
- Tim Kasher – guitar, vocals
- Gretta Cohn – cello
- Matt Maginn – bass guitar
- Clint Schnase – drums
- Ted Stevens – guitar, vocals
- Mike Mogis – recording, mixing, production
- Doug Van Sloun – mastering

=== Eastern Youth ===
- Hisashi Yoshino – guitar, vocals
- Tomokazu Ninomiya – bass guitar
- Atsuya Tamori – drums
- Eddie Ashworth – recording, mixing, production
- Shinji Yoshikoshi – assistant engineering
- Eddy Schreyer – mastering
