= Eastern Youth =

Japanese punk rock trio

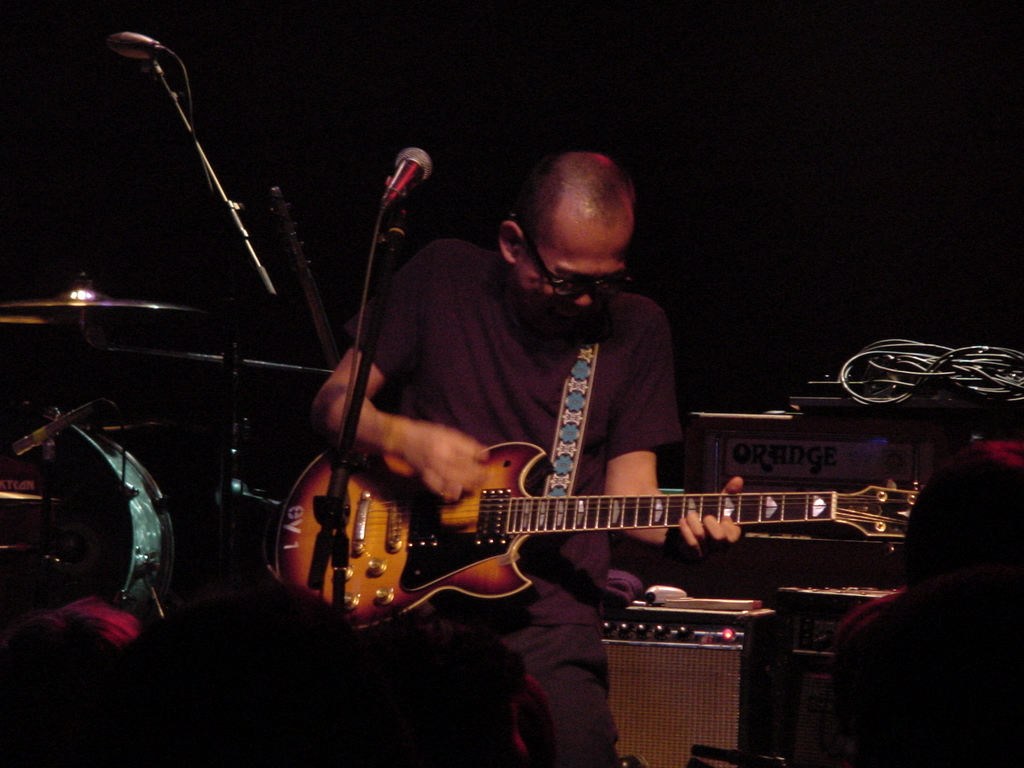
- Eastern Youth playing in Nashville, Tennessee

Background information
- Also known as: Scanners (1986–1988); Eastern Yooth; イースタンユース
- Origin: Hokkaidō, Japan
- Genres: Punk rock; post-hardcore; emo; indie rock; Oi! (early); street punk (early)
- Years active: 1986–present
- Labels: Saddle Creek; Vap; Five One; King; Toy's Factory; Hadashi no Ongakusha; Sakamoto Shōten; BSP
- Members: Hisashi Yoshino; Atsuya Tamori; Yuka Muraoka
- Past members: Tohru Mitsuhashi; Tomokazu Ninomiya; Taketomo Sasai
- Website: www.hadashino-ongakusha.jp

Eastern Youth is a Japanese punk rock trio formed in 1986 in Hokkaidō. Their sound blends many different styles, and is especially complex for a three-piece band. Their lyrics express the helplessness of Japanese youths. Their influences include Fugazi, Jawbreaker, Jets to Brazil, Stiff Little Fingers and Discharge.

== Career ==
Eastern Youth was formed as Scanners in 1986 by childhood friends Hisashi Yoshino and Atsuya Tamori in Sapporo, Hokkaidō. From 1989 to 1993 they were the top Oi!/skinhead act in Japan. They released 3 albums, 1 single, and were on several compilation albums. The band changed their name from EASTERN YOUTH to Eastern youth, and shed the skinhead image of their past. The band moved to Tokyo in 1990. In 1995, they put out their first release on their record label, 坂本商店: (Sakamoto-Shoten) 口笛、夜更けに響 Kuchibue Yofuke-ni-Hibiku ("A Whistle Rings Late At Night"). Within the next 5 years, Eastern Youth became legendary to the Japanese indie rock scene and in 2000 they played in the United States for the first time, with At The Drive-In, largely broadening their popularity. They continued to tour America with Jimmy Eat World in 2001, and Saddle Creek band Cursive in 2006, with whom Eastern Youth split sides on 2002's 8 Teeth to Eat You EP. During the "Bottom of the World"-Tour 2015 Tomokazu Ninomiya announced that he would be leaving the band. He was replaced by Muraoka Yuka.

== Members ==
Current members

- Hisashi Yoshino (吉野寿) – lead vocals, guitars (1986–present)
- Atsuya Tamori (田森篤哉) – drums (1986–present)
- Yuka Muraoka (村岡ゆか) – bass (2015–present)

Former members

- Taketomo Sasai (笹井 猛朋) – bass (1986–1988)
- Tohru Mitsuhashi (三橋徹) – bass (1988–1991)
- Tomokazu Ninomiya (二宮友和) – bass (1992–2015)

== Discography ==
=== Singles ===
- For Skins and Punks EP (1991)
- Noboru Asahi Abite (1991)
- Hadashi de Ikazaru wo Enai (1996)
- Aosugiru Sora (1997)
- Kaze no Naka (1999)
- Amazarashi nara Nureru ga Ii sa (1999)
- Seijaku ga Moeru (2000)
- Kakatonaru (2001)
- Sekai ha Warehibiku Miminari no you da (2002)
- Kyousei Shiryoku 0.6 (Corrected Eyesight 0.6) (2004)
- Boiling Point 36 °C (October 24, 2007)
- Akai-Inoatama Blues (February 6, 2008)
- Tokeidai no Kane (November 14, 2018)

=== Albums ===
- East End Land (1989)
- Time Is Running (1990)
- Eastern Youth (1993)
- 口笛、夜更けに響く (1995)
- 孤立無援の花 (1997)
- 旅路ニ季節ガ燃エ落チル (1998)
- 雲射抜ケ声 (1999)
- 感受性応答セヨ (2001)
- 其処カラ何ガ見エルカ (2003) "What Can You See From Your Place"
- DON QUIJOTE (2004)
- 365步のブルース (2006) "365-Step Blues"
- 地球の裏から風が吹く (2007) "Blowing from the Other Side of the Earth"
- 歩幅と太陽 (2009) "The Pace With the Sun"
- 心ノ底ニ灯火トモセ (2011) "Kokoro No Soko Ni Tomoshibi Tomose"
- 叙景ゼロ番地 (2012) "Jokei Zero Banchi"
- ボトムオブザワールド (2015) "Bottom Of The World"
- SONGentoJIYU (2017)
- 2020 (2020)

=== DVDs ===
- Sono Zanzou to Zankyouon (2001)
- Archives 1997–2001 (2004)
- 日比谷野外大音楽堂公演 DVD 2019.9.28 (2020)
