= There Is No Beginning to the Story =

EP by Bright Eyes
- Released: May 6, 2002
- Genre: Emo; indie rock; indie folk
- Label: Saddle Creek
- Producer: Mike Mogis

Bright Eyes chronology
Oh Holy Fools: The Music of Son, Ambulance & Bright Eyes (2001)	There Is No Beginning to the Story (2002)	Lifted or The Story Is in the Soil, Keep Your Ear to the Ground (2002)

Professional ratings
Review scores
Source	Rating
Pitchfork Media	7.4/10

There Is No Beginning to the Story is the third EP by Bright Eyes. The songs on it are fairly varied, with "From a Balance Beam" and "Loose Leaves" having more electronic qualities, while "Messenger Bird's Song" and "We Are Free Men" are more rooted in acoustic. The 12" vinyl edition includes 2 extra songs: "Amy in the White Coat" and a Neil Young cover, "Out on the Weekend".

This album is the 45th release of Saddle Creek Records.

== Track listing ==
1. "From a Balance Beam"
2. "Messenger Bird's Song"
3. "We Are Free Men"
4. "Loose Leaves"
5. "Amy in the White Coat" (vinyl release only)
6. "Out on the Weekend" (Neil Young) (vinyl release only)

== Personnel ==
- Todd Baechle - voice
- Kriss Brooks - piano
- Stefanie Drootin - organ
- Orenda Fink - trumpet, voice
- Margret Fish - bassoon
- Jason Flatowicz - trombone
- Simon Joyner - voice, good advice
- Jiha Lee - flute, voice
- Andy LeMaster - electric guitars, voice
- Clay Leverett - voice
- Matt Maginn - bass, pylons
- Roslyn Maginn - percussion
- Mike Mogis - hammered dulcimer, vibraphone, glockenspiel, mandolin, dobro, banjo, bells, electric guitars
- Conor Oberst - guitars, Rhodes, piano, voice
- Casey Scott - bass, percussion
- Maria Taylor - piano, voice

Drum Corps

- Clark Baechle
- Matt Focht
- Clay Leverett
- Clint Schnase
- Mike Sweeney

Production

- Mike Mogis - Recording, mixing
- Andy LeMaster - Recording
- Doug Van Sloun - Mastering
- Zack Nipper - Diorama, layout
- Matt Maginn - Layout

== Charts ==
Chart (2012)	Peak position
US Vinyl Albums (Billboard)	14
