= Southerly (band) =

American musical act

Southerly is a United States musical act, a solo project of Krist Kreuger. The Madison, Wisconsin native started the project in 2001, releasing an EP, but put it on hiatus to focus on building his own independent booking agency, The Crow Agency. After picking the project back up, he took it on tour across the United States, Canada, and Paraguay.

Relocating to Portland in 2006 (and forming into a full band with Robert Bartleson on bass guitar, Ryan Heise (from System and Station, Protest Hill) on drums, and Casey Montgomery on guitar, accordion, organ and more), Southerly is set to release their new full length, Storyteller and the Gossip Columnist, in May 2007 on Portland's Greyday Records.

== Discography ==
- Monday Morning Mourning EP (2001) - Dharmakayamusic
- Expressionless EP (2003) - Dead Letter Records
- Best Dressed And Expressionless LP (2004) - Dead Letter Records, Fall Records (re-release)
- Southerly/The Conversation Split LP (2005) - Fall Records
- Southerly Storyteller and the Gossip Columnist (2007) - Greyday Records
