= Now It's Overhead (album) =

Studio album by Now It's Overhead
- Released: October 2, 2001
- Genre: Indie rock
- Length: 36:07
- Label: Saddle Creek
- Producer: Andy LeMaster

Now It's Overhead chronology
Now It's Overhead (2001)	Fall Back Open (2004)

Professional ratings
Review scores
Source	Rating
AllMusic	3/5 stars
Orlando Weekly	
Pitchfork	6.0/10
PopMatters	

Now It's Overhead is the debut album by the band Now It's Overhead from Athens, Georgia. It was released on October 2, 2001. This was Saddle Creek Records' first full-length album by a band from outside of Nebraska. The band consisted of Andy LeMaster (vocals, instruments, recording), Orenda Fink (bass, keyboards, trumpet, vocals), Maria Taylor (keyboards, vocals), and Clay Leverett (drums, vocals).

Andy LeMaster, former Sugar bassist David Barbe, and Glands bassist Andy Baker jointly own and operate Chase Park Transduction Recording Studio in Athens. Along with the Now It's Overhead recording, Chase Park has also made recordings by Japancakes, Azure Ray, Seaworthy, Amy Ray, and The Glands.

== Track listing ==
Now It's Overhead track listing
No.	Title	Length
1.	"Blackout Curtain"	4:17
2.	"Who's Jon"	4:19
3.	"Hi"	4:03
4.	"Hold Your Spin"	3:47
5.	"6th Grade Roller"	3:03
6.	"Wonderful Scar"	4:03
7.	"With a Subtle Look"	5:01
8.	"Goodbye Highway"	3:58
9.	"Skeleton on Display"	4:56
