= One Jug of Wine, Two Vessels =

EP by Bright Eyes and Neva Dinova
- Released: January 20, 2004
- Recorded: 2004
- Genre: Indie rock
- Length: 21:51; 36:10 (reissue)
- Label: Crank!

Bright Eyes chronology
| A Christmas Album (2002) | One Jug of Wine, Two Vessels (2004) | I'm Wide Awake, It's Morning (2005) |

Neva Dinova chronology
| Neva Dinova (2002) | One Jug of Wine, Two Vessels (EP) (2004) | The Hate Yourself Change (2005) |

Professional ratings
Review scores
| Source | Rating |
|---|---|
| AllMusic | 3/5 stars |
| BBC | Neutral |
| Blender | 4/5 stars |
| Drowned in Sound | 8/10 |
| Pitchfork | 5.8/10 |
| Rolling Stone | 3/5 stars |
| Robert Christgau (original) | (dud) |

One Jug of Wine, Two Vessels is a collaborative split EP by Bright Eyes and Neva Dinova. It was released in 2004 on Crank! Records. It was also reissued on CD/LP/Digital by Saddle Creek Records on March 23, 2010, with four newly recorded bonus tracks not included on the original release, which were written/recorded in late 2009.

== Track listing ==
One Jug of Wine, Two Vessels track listing
| No. | Title | Artist | Length |
|---|---|---|---|
| 1. | "Tripped" | Neva Dinova | 3:16 |
| 2. | "Black Comedy" | Bright Eyes | 2:26 |
| 3. | "Poison" | Neva Dinova | 3:40 |
| 4. | "I'll Be Your Friend" | Bright Eyes | 4:07 |
| 5. | "Get Back" | Neva Dinova | 4:09 |
| 6. | "Spring Cleaning" | Bright Eyes; Neva Dinova | 4:13 |
| Total length: | | | 21:51 |

2010 reissue track listing
| No. | Title | Artist | Length |
|---|---|---|---|
| 1. | "Rollerskating" | Neva Dinova | 3:33 |
| 2. | "Happy Accident" | Bright Eyes | 3:12 |
| 3. | "Someone's Love" | Neva Dinova | 2:49 |
| 4. | "I Know You" | Bright Eyes | 4:42 |
| 5. | "Tripped" | Neva Dinova | 3:16 |
| 6. | "Black Comedy" | Bright Eyes | 2:27 |
| 7. | "Poison" | Neva Dinova | 3:40 |
| 8. | "I'll Be Your Friend" | Bright Eyes | 4:08 |
| 9. | "Get Back" | Neva Dinova | 4:09 |
| 10. | "Spring Cleaning" | Bright Eyes; Neva Dinova | 4:14 |
| Total length: | | | 36:10 |

- "Spring Cleaning" was written by Bright Eyes and performed by Neva Dinova

== Musicians ==
- Nick White – keyboards
- Gretta Cohn – cello
- Casey Scott – whistling
- Doug Wray – bass, engineering
- Orenda Fink – trumpet
- Mike Mogis – bass, banjo, guitar
- John Hischke – saxophone
- Conor Oberst – vocals, guitar
- Bo Anderson – drums
- Roger Lewis – drums
- Jake Bellows – vocals, guitar
- Heath Koontz – bass
- Tim Haes – guitar
- Mike Kratky – guitar
- Nate Walcott – organ, piano, keyboards, trumpet
- Corina Escamilla – piano, vocals

== Charts ==
Chart performance for One Jug of Wine, Two Vessels
| Chart (2004) | Peak position |
|---|---|
| US Independent Albums (Billboard) | 34 |
