= Dark Light Daybreak =

Studio album by Now It's Overhead
- Released: September 12, 2006
- Genre: Indie rock
- Length: 37:18
- Label: Saddle Creek Records
- Producer: Andy LeMaster

Now It's Overhead chronology
Fall Back Open (2004)	Dark Light Daybreak (2006)

Professional ratings
Aggregate scores
Source	Rating
Metacritic	68/100
Review scores
Source	Rating
AllMusic	4/5 stars
Pitchfork	6.6/10
PopMatters	3/10
Paste	2.5/5 stars
Alternative Press	4/5
Spin	2.5/5 stars

Dark Light Daybreak is the third studio album by Athens-based band, Now It's Overhead. It was released on September 12, 2006.

== Track listing ==
1. "Let the Sirens Rest" – 4:09
2. "Estranged" – 4:01
3. "Walls" – 3:43
4. "Believe What They Decide" – 3:39
5. "Night Vision" – 3:51
6. "Type A" – 2:25
7. "Dark Light Daybreak" – 3:53
8. "Meaning to Say" – 4:01
9. "Let Up" – 3:26
10. "Nothing in Our Way" – 4:10
