= Everybody's Coming Down =

Studio album by The Good Life
- Released: August 14, 2015
- Studio: ARC Studios, Omaha, Nebraska
- Genre: Indie rock
- Length: 37:52
- Label: Saddle Creek Records

The Good Life chronology
Help Wanted Nights (2007)	Everybody's Coming Down (2015)

Everybody's Coming Down is the fifth studio album by indie-rock band The Good Life, released on August 14, 2015 on Saddle Creek Records.

The Good Life's first album in eight years, Everybody's Coming Down is described by Jon Hadusek of Consequence of Sound as being lyrically "the diary of an oft-tormented songwriter who’s finally reached a point of realization" and musically as "a loose jam with friends."

== Background ==
The last The Good Life album was 2007's Help Wanted Nights, and since that time members of the band generally moved away from their hometown of Omaha, Nebraska and worked on other projects. Founder, singer and songwriter Tim Kasher released two albums with his other band, Cursive, as well as two solo albums and in the process wound up living in Chicago. Bassist Stefanie Drootin-Senseney relocated to Los Angeles with her husband, fellow musician Chris Senseney, and they formed the band Big Harp and released two albums as well as starting a family. Keyboardist Ryan Fox started a label and did some solo work after moving to Portland, Oregon, and drummer Roger Lewis stayed and worked in Omaha.

Previous albums by The Good Life had primarily been singer/songwriter focused on Kasher's work with lyrics and melodies, but this album was intended to be a truly collaborative work between bandmembers, with the entire band having a say in the songwriting process and sharing songwriting credit. Reflecting this, Kasher said in an interview with Substream magazine's Mischa Perlman that "this is the first time the band really is a band. It’s representative of who all the members are. In the past, with previous albums, I had these ideas for how an album should sound, and it was more them meeting me in the middle.”

== Critical reception ==
Everybody's Coming Down has received a "weighted average" score of 67 out of 100 by Metacritic, aggregated from eight independent reviews, which gives the album "generally favorable" reviews. Exclaim!'s Peter Sanfilippo calls the record "focused and purposeful" and Aaron Mook of absolutepunk.net said the album is "an experimental but mostly successful step further down a path of fuzzy, theatrical rock and roll." However, Pitchfork's Ian Cohen said, "it just sounds secondhand, scripts written by someone whose worldview has been shaped mostly by Cursive records," and that it's "a barely fictionalized, deadened version of [Kasher's] own life starring him." Similarly, Magnet magazine observed that the album "limps along on wounded extremities, with quirky cleverness displaced in favor of sloppy indie-rock tropes," while Marcy Donelson of AllMusic characterizes the album as "engaging if meandering."

== Track listing ==
All songs by The Good Life

No.	Title	Length
1.	"7 in the Morning"	0:31
2.	"Everybody"	3:42
3.	"The Troubadour's Green Room"	3:25
4.	"Holy Shit"	1:49
5.	"Flotsam Locked into a Groove"	4:08
6.	"Forever Coming Down"	2:34
7.	"Happy Hour"	1:40
8.	"Diving Bell"	4:07
9.	"Skeleton Song"	2:26
10.	"How Small We Are"	5:08
11.	"Ad Nausea"	3:35
12.	"Midnight Is Upon Us"	3:47
Total length:		37:52

== Personnel ==
- Tim Kasher – vocals, guitar, keyboards
- Stefanie Drootin-Senseney – bass, vocals, keyboards
- Ryan Fox – guitars, keyboards, vocals, electronic percussion
- Roger L. Lewis – drums, acoustic/electronic percussion
