= Pacific UV =

American indie rock band

pacificUV
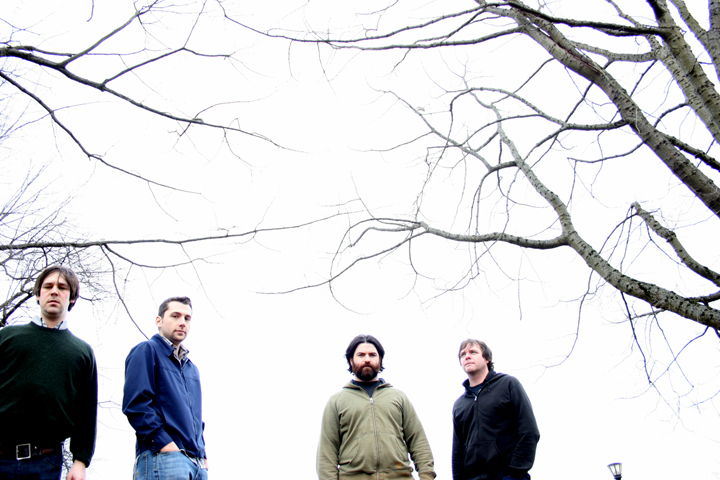

Background information
- Origin: Athens, Georgia, United States; Portland, Oregon, U.S.
- Genres: Indie rock, dream pop, slowcore, post-rock, shoegazing
- Years active: 1998 - present
- Label: Mazarine Records
- Members: Clay Jordan; Suny Lyons; Lemuel Hayes; Laura Solomon
- Past members: Mike Erwin; Matt Kline; Kevin Davis; Howard Hudson; Lucas Jensen; Stephen James; Jesse Robert W Jorge Torres; Shane Davis; Jack Kelly
- Website: http://www.pacificuv.com/

pacificUV is an indie rock band currently residing in Athens, Georgia. Their style is frequently categorized as utilizing elements of dream pop, post-rock, shoegazing and space rock. They are currently signed to Mazarine Records.

== History ==
=== Formation ===
The band was formed in Athens, Georgia in 1998. Founding members include Howard Hudson, Clay Jordan, and Lucas Jensen.

Their first full-length record (which was titled Longplay 1 when originally pressed on compact-disc but was later renamed with an eponymous title) was released on WARM Recordings in 2002, and was produced by Andy LeMaster. The album was called "a masterpiece" and rated 4 stars by Rolling Stone.

=== Move to Portland ===
After a national tour, and nearly universal acclaim for their debut record, the initial formation of the band dissolved. Jordan relocated to Portland and recruited new band members: Mike Erwin (7 Years In Space), Kevin Davis (of Glowworm), Jesse Robert W. (also of Glowworm), and Matt Kline. Shortly after the Portland lineup was solidified, WARM Records released a 4-song EP featuring three unreleased tracks and an Eluvium remix of L.A.P.D. vs N.Y.P.D.

In February 2008, the band released their second full-length LP, titled Longplay 2. The record features vocals by Carolyn Berk (of Lovers) and the artwork of Chris A'lurede. It was recorded by Adam Selzer (of Norfolk & Western) and Jason Powers at Type Foundry Studios in Portland. Pitchfork rated the album 7.9 and called it "comforting".

The pacificUV song "Alarmist" was featured in the 2009 season-finale of the Showtime drama Californication.

=== Return to Athens ===
By 2011, everyone but Jordan had left the band. Jordan moved back to Athens, Georgia, and recruited new bandmates. They released the EP Chrysalis, their first release on Mazarine Records, a non-profit label founded by band members Suny Lyon and Clay Jordan in Athens, Georgia.

In 2012 pacificUV released Weekends, their third studio LP. Weekends is a concept album about drug use after a break-up. The album featured B.P. Helium (Of Montreal), John Fernandez (The Olivia Tremor Control), and Heather McIntosh. One reviewer called it: "a characteristically trippy, yet altogether blissful dream pop gem".

In 2013, they released After the Dream You Are Awake, which some reviewers found to be more pop-friendly than their previous releases.

== Style ==
Their influences include Mazzy Star and Spacemen 3. They have been compared to The Jesus and Mary Chain.

== Discography ==
=== Studio albums ===
- Pacific UV - 2002 - WARM Records (also known as Longplay 1)
- Longplay 2 - 2008 - WARM Records
- Weekends - 2012 - Mazarine Records
- After the Dream You Are Awake - 2013 - Mazarine Records

=== EPs ===
- Pacific UV EP - 2006 - WARM Records
- Chrysalis - 2011 - Mazarine Records
