= Novena on a Nocturn =

Studio album by The Good Life
- Released: November 10, 2000
- Genre: Indie rock
- Length: 32:36
- Label: Better Looking Records
- Producers: Mike Mogis, Tim Kasher

The Good Life chronology
| Novena on a Nocturn (2000) | Black Out (2002) |

Novena on a Nocturn is the debut album of the band The Good Life from Omaha, Nebraska. The band is the side project of Tim Kasher, lead singer of Cursive. It was released on Better Looking Records in 2000.

== Concept ==
This album was inspired by Tim Kasher's failed relationship and bitter divorce from his first wife Kim in 2000. The name shows the concept of the album as a novena, a Catholic devotion consisting of nine separate days of prayers, reflecting the album's nine tracks. The first track, "A Dim Entrance", depicts a character who is in the middle of a failing relationship and exhausted from trying to save it (Send me to bed, And I fall asleep / To an overwhelming sad). The remaining tracks are all introspective reflections into the relationship of the main character and his evaluation of the relationship. "The Competition" provides the listener with an overview of the relationship, from beginning to what will ultimately be the end. The final song, "A Golden Exit" describes the conversation between the main character and his estranged lover, ending the relationship and looking forward to a bright, new beginning for both people (Maybe we'll wake up with golden wings, Maybe we'll get wings / anything to set us free).

== Reception ==
Professional ratings
Review scores
| Source | Rating |
|---|---|
| AllMusic | 4/5 stars |
| Tiny Mix Tapes | 3/5 stars |

Stanton Swihart of AllMusic wrote, "The music is minimalistic but also cleverly layered with intriguing sounds, particularly eerie keyboards and bits of electronics. It is sweeping, intense music with volumes of emotional resonance and a tragic undercurrent." Swihart drew comparisons to British bands of the 1980s, including The Cure, Orchestral Manoeuvres in the Dark, and Ultravox.

== Track listing ==
1. "A Dim Entrance" – 3:38
2. "The Moon Red Handed" – 2:54
3. "Your Birthday Present" – 4:15
4. "An Acquaintance Strikes a Chord" – 3:12
5. "Twenty Two" – 3:32
6. "What We Fall for When We're Already Down" – 2:41
7. "Waiting on Wild Horses" – 3:43
8. "The Competition" – 4:52
9. "A Golden Exit" – 5:09
