= Consafos =

American indie rock band

Consafos is a four-piece indie rock band from Los Angeles, California and Omaha, Nebraska. Made up of four veteran musicians from such bands as Topeka, Ritual of Defiance, Glasscraft, and current members of Bright Eyes and The Good Life as well as Crazy Horse's Billy Talbot's son Billy Talbot Jr.

The name of the band derives from "con safos," a Chicano term meaning "with safety," used to mark graffiti. If such a piece was marked with "con safos," it was off limits, a sort of trademark, and a way of indicating that a graffito was complete and unarguable.

== Discography ==
- Such is the Way of Things EP (2004 · Greyday Productions)
- Tilting at Windmills (2005 · Greyday Productions)

== See also ==
- The Good Life
