= Burst and Bloom =

EP by Cursive
- Released: July 23, 2001
- Genre: Emo; post-hardcore; indie rock
- Length: 21:56
- Label: Saddle Creek Records
- Producer: Cursive, Mike Mogis

Cursive chronology
Domestica (2000)	Burst and Bloom (2001)	The Ugly Organ (2003)

Professional ratings
Review scores
Source	Rating
AllMusic	3/5 stars
Punknews.org	4.5/5 stars
Pitchfork Media	6.9/10
Robert Christgau	(1-star Honorable Mention)

Burst and Bloom is an EP by American indie rock band Cursive, released in 2001 on Saddle Creek Records. It is the band's first release with cellist Gretta Cohn. Some lyrics in the song "Sink To The Beat" reference the song-writing process and their record label ("This is the latest from Saddle Creek"). This theme would carry over to Cursive's next full length, The Ugly Organ, which again contained songs referencing the song writing process ("Art Is Hard").

The opening to Tracks 2 and 4, "The Great Decay" and "Mothership, Mothership, Do You Read Me?", are prominently featured in Emogame and its sequel.

On April 21, 2012, Burst and Bloom was re-released on limited edition vinyl for Record Store Day

This album is the 35th release of Saddle Creek Records.

== Track listing ==
No.	Title	Length
1.	"Sink to the Beat"	4:13
2.	"The Great Decay"	4:17
3.	"Tall Tales, Telltales"	5:08
4.	"Mothership, Mothership, Do You Read Me?"	4:18
5.	"Fairytales Tell Tales"	4:02

== Personnel ==
Cursive

- Tim Kasher - vocals, guitar
- Matt Maginn - bass
- Clint Schnase - drums
- Ted Stevens - vocals, guitar
- Gretta Cohn - cello

Technical personnel

- Doug Van Sloun - mastering
- Mike Mogis - recording, production
