= LadyLuck =

Studio album by Maria Taylor
- Released: March 31, 2009
- Genre: Folk rock
- Length: 37:10
- Labels: Flower Moon Records; Nettwerk Music Group

Maria Taylor chronology
Lynn Teeter Flower (2007)	LadyLuck (2009)	Overlook (2011)

Singles from LadyLuck
- 1. "Time Lapse Lifeline"; 2. "Cartoons and Forever Plans (feat. Michael Stipe)"

Professional ratings
Review scores
Source	Rating
Paste	6.7/10
AbsolutePunk.net	(89%)
AllMusic	3.5/5 stars
Mog.com	3.5/5 stars
The Tune	(C+)

LadyLuck is the third album by Maria Taylor, originally released on March 31, 2009. The album features the song "Cartoons and Forever Plans," co-written by and including guest vocals from R.E.M.'s Michael Stipe. LadyLuck reached number 48 on Billboard's "Heatseakers" charts. KCRW DJ Gary Calamar ranked "Time Lapse Lifeline" as number one, in his top 10 songs of 2009. "Time Lapse Lifeline" was featured in the 24th episode of the fourth season of the FOX show Bones ("The Beaver in the Otter"). The album was re-released on Taylor's own label, Flower Moon Records, in 2016.

== Track listing ==
1. "LadyLuck" – 3:14
2. "Time Lapse Lifeline" – 4:00
3. "It's Time" – 3:43
4. "My Favorite Love" – 3:24
5. "100,000 Times" – 3:43
6. "Green Butterfly" – 4:12
7. "Broad Daylight" – 5:11
8. "A Chance" – 3:19
9. "Orchids" – 3:34
10. "Cartoons and Forever Plans" (feat. Michael Stipe) – 2:55

== Personnel ==
- Maria Taylor - Composer, Drums, Guitar (Acoustic), Guitar (Classical), Keyboards, Piano, Primary Artist, Vocals
- Andy LeMaster- Bass, Composer, Engineer, Guitar, Guitar (Electric), Mellotron, Mixing, Organ, Percussion, Producer, Vocals
- Mike Mogis - Bass, Chimes, Engineer, Guitar, Guitar (Electric), Instrumentation, Mixing, Pedal Steel, Percussion, Producer, Vibraphone
- Nate Walcott - String Arrangements, Woodwind Arrangement
- Michael Stipe - Composer, Vocals
- Ian Aeillo - Guitar (Electric), Hook
- Lukas Burton - Producer
- Louis Schefano - Composer
- Danny Kalb - Engineer, Producer
- Stephen Marsh - Mastering
- Craig Ryer - Composer, Keyboards, Vocals
- Michael Shackelford - Drums, Guitar, Vocals
- McKenzie Smith - Drums, Percussion
- Macey Taylor Jr. - Bass, Guitar (Classical), Mellotron, Vocals
- Jonathan Wilson - Drums
- Autumn de Wilde - Photography
