= Sorry About Dresden =

American indie rock band

- Origin: Chapel Hill, North Carolina, United States
- Genres: Indie rock
- Years active: 1997–2016
- Labels: Route 14 Records, Saddle Creek Records
- Past members: James Hepler: drummer Matt Oberst: singer/guitarist Eric Roehrig: singer/guitarist Matt Tomich: bassist

Sorry About Dresden was an indie rock band from Chapel Hill, North Carolina. The band formed in 1997 and was signed to Saddle Creek Records. Sorry About Dresden has released three full-length albums, an EP, and has appeared on several compilations.

== History ==
In 1997, Omaha, Nebraska-born Matt Oberst founded Sorry About Dresden in Chapel Hill, North Carolina with bassist Matt Tomich, guitarist/vocalist Eric Roehrig, and drummer James Hepler. Though the name of the band references the bombing of Dresden during World War II, Sorry About Dresden is "neither ideological nor depressive".

The band's first release was the single "Crusades" in 1998. Their debut album The Mayor Will Abdicate came out in 1999 on the independent label Route 14 Records. This was followed by How the Cold War Began EP and The Convenience of Indecision album, both released in 2001.

Sorry About Dresden's biggest commercial success came by way of their third album Let It Rest (2003) with Saddle Creek Records, an Omaha-based label started by Justin Oberst, brother of the band's frontman Matt Oberst. Matt Oberst's younger brother, Conor Oberst of the popular indie act Bright Eyes, is also on the label.

In March 2006, Sorry About Dresden played a show after not having performed in over a year.

Singer and guitarist Matt Oberst died on November 27, 2016, at the age of 42. The surviving members played a memorial concert in Oberst's honor on January 4, 2020 as part of the Cat's Cradle (venue) 50th anniversary.

The song "Ghost (Is Leaving Me)", recorded during "The Convenience Of Indecision" sessions, was released posthumously on October 22, 2021.

== Discography ==
=== Albums ===
- The Mayor Will Abdicate (1999) - Route 14 Records
- The Convenience of Indecision (2001) - Saddle Creek Records
- Let It Rest (2003) - Saddle Creek Records

=== Singles ===
- "Crusades"/"Me and Kim Il Sung" (1998) - Dude City Records
- Sorry About Dresden/The White Octave 7" split ("What The Sea Left Behind Part 2" / "Felix Culpa") (2000) - Moment Before Impact Records
- Rock School ("State You Hate", "Lachrymose/Obsequious/Vehement/Elated") (2000) - Moment Before Impact Records
- Bright Eyes/Rilo Kiley/Sorry About Dresden 7" split ("Candid Camera") (2002) - Devil in the Woods Magazine Issue #55
- Sorry About Dresden/Cold Sides 7" split ("Leviathan") (2003) - Sit n' Spin Records
- Sorry About Dresden/The Jagular Drop 7" split (2006) - Horn Records
- Ghost (Is Leaving Me) (2021) - Saddle Creek Records

=== EPs ===
- How The Cold War Began (2001) - Moment Before Impact Records

=== Contributions and appearances ===
- The Bridges of Dissonant County Vol. 1 ("What Gives You Butterflies?") (1998) - 2A Records
- Pet Sounds Volume One: A Benefit For Alter ("My Universe") (1999) - Vital Cog Records
- NE vs NC ("Some Precision") (2002) - The Redemption Recording CO.
- Patchwork: A Compilation ("An Unmade Bed") (2002) - Mere Exposure
- Saddle Creek 50 ("Sick and Sore", "People Have Parties") (2002) - Saddle Creek Records
- I Am A Cold Rock. I Am Dull Grass: A Tribute to Will Oldham ("All Gone, All Gone") (2004) - Tract Records
- Lagniappe: A Saddle Creek Benefit for Hurricane Katrina ("Sunrise: Norfolk, Virginia") (2005) - Saddle Creek Records
- Sing For Your Meat: A Tribute to Guided By Voices ("Echos Myron") (2011) - No More Fake Labels
