= Help Wanted Nights =

Studio album by The Good Life
- Released: September 11, 2007
- Genre: Indie rock
- Length: 40:13
- Label: Saddle Creek
- Producer: Mike Mogis

The Good Life chronology
Album of the Year (2004)	Help Wanted Nights (2007)	Everybody's Coming Down (2015)

Professional ratings
Aggregate scores
Source	Rating
Metacritic	61/100
Review scores
Source	Rating
AllMusic	3/5 stars
Blender	3.5/5 stars
Drowned in Sound	7/10
Lost at Sea	6.7/10
Pitchfork	7.0/10

Help Wanted Nights is the fourth album by the Omaha-based band The Good Life, released on September 11, 2007, on Saddle Creek Records. Currently, frontman Tim Kasher has moved to Los Angeles and has written a screenplay entitled Help Wanted Nights. He has stated that the screenplay acts as a 'counterpart' to the album:

I tried to have the songs be less storytelling, and less narrative...since I was writing this fictionalized counterpart to this thing, I kind of liked the idea of writing songs to [exist] more as ideas that complement something else that was written. I tried to focus less on narrative and more on those big ideas.

In regard to the content of the album, Kasher reveals that the new album involves:

"Roughly a week in a bar in a small town where a stranger's car breaks down...so, he fraternizes with the regulars, getting too wrapped up in their sordid lives. Something like that."

== Release ==
Help Wanted Nights was made available for streaming on September 5, 2007, prior to its release six days later through Saddle Creek Records. Between September and December 2007, the Good Life went on a tour of the US, followed by a trek around mainland Europe.

== Track listing ==
1. "On the Picket Fence" - 3:33
2. "A Little Bit More" - 3:23
3. "Heartbroke" - 1:56
4. "Your Share of Men" - 2:32
5. "You Don't Feel Like Home to Me" - 4:40
6. "Keely Aimee" - 3:30
7. "Playing Dumb" - 2:17
8. "Some Tragedy" - 3:44
9. "So Let Go" - 3:54
10. "Rest Your Head" - 10:44
