= 11:11 (Maria Taylor album) =

Studio album by Maria Taylor
- Released: May 24, 2005
- Studio: Presto! (Lincoln, Nebraska); Chase Park Transduction (Athens, Georgia)
- Genre: Folktronica
- Length: 39:39
- Label: Saddle Creek
- Producer: Andy LeMaster; Mike Mogis

Maria Taylor chronology
11:11 (2005)	Lynn Teeter Flower (2007)

Professional ratings
Aggregate scores
Source	Rating
Metacritic	78/100
Review scores
Source	Rating
AllMusic	4/5 stars
Alternative Press	5/5
The Boston Phoenix	3/4 stars
Entertainment Weekly	B+
Mojo	4/5 stars
NME	6/10
Pitchfork	6.2/10
Q	3/5 stars
Rolling Stone	3.5/5 stars
Uncut	4/5 stars

11:11 is the debut solo album by American musician Maria Taylor. It was released on May 24, 2005 by Saddle Creek Records. The album was produced by Andy LeMaster and Mike Mogis, who also provide additional musical backing throughout. It features appearances from Conor Oberst of Bright Eyes and Gretta Cohn of Cursive, among others, while one track was written by Taylor's former Little Red Rocket bandmate Louis Schefano.

A music video was released for the track "Song Beneath the Song", directed by Tai Yin Ho. 11:11 was released on vinyl LP for the first time in 2015 for Record Store Day. The album was later reissued by Taylor's own label Flower Moon Records.

"Song Beneath the Song" was included on the first volume of the soundtrack for the television series Grey's Anatomy in 2005, and subsequently became the namesake for a 2011 episode of the series. The song was also featured in the television series One Tree Hill, at the end of 8th episode of the 3rd season.

== Track listing ==
All tracks are written by Maria Taylor, except where noted.

1. "Leap Year" – 4:28
2. "Song Beneath the Song" – 3:59
3. "Two of Those Too" – 4:26
4. "Nature Song" (Louis Schefano) – 4:08
5. "Lighthouse" – 3:36
6. "One for the Shareholder" – 3:26
7. "Xanax" – 5:42
8. "Birmingham 1982" – 3:32
9. "Speak Easy" – 3:31
10. "Hitched!" – 2:51

== Personnel ==
Credits are adapted from the album's liner notes.

- Maria Taylor – vocals, acoustic guitar, piano, electric piano, Rhodes piano, drums
- Brad Armstrong – guitar, banjo, mandolin, organ
- Gretta Cohn – cello
- Andrej Curty – violin
- Andy LeMaster – guitar, keyboards, organ, backing vocals, programming, production, mixing, recording
- Mike Mogis (also credited as Digital Audio Engine) – guitar, pedal steel guitar, bass, keyboard bass, mandolin, keyboards, programming, production, mixing, recording
- Conor Oberst – backing vocals
- Kim Salistean – violin
- Macey Taylor – bass
- Jadon Ulrich – layout
- Viktor Uzur – cello
- Doug Van Sloun – mastering
