= Andy LeMaster =

American singer/songwriter

- Origin: Athens, Georgia
- Genres: Indie Rock; Experimental Rock; Electronic Music; Singer/Songwriter
- Occupation(s): Songwriter; Musician; Producer; Engineer
- Instrument(s): Guitar; Bass; Voice; Synths; Programming
- Labels: Saddle Creek Records

Andy LeMaster is an American musician, songwriter, engineer, and producer from Athens, Georgia. Now It's Overhead is the primary project for his own songwriting, while he also releases music under his own name and contributes as a co-writer on various projects. LeMaster has engineered, produced, and performed on many albums since he began recording in the late 1990s, including releases by Bright Eyes, Now It's Overhead, Azure Ray, Conor Oberst, Maria Taylor, Orenda Fink, Better Oblivion Community Center, and Michael Stipe. He has been a frequent touring member of Bright Eyes since the late 90's, and has performed live as a band member with several other artists including Azure Ray, Fischerspooner, and Michael Stipe.

LeMaster is co-owner of Chase Park Transduction recording studio in Athens with fellow producer/engineer/musician, David Barbe. He is also a visual artist, and has done all the covers for Now It's Overhead's records. He made a guest appearance on Late Night with David Letterman in 2007 playing bass as a rotating member of the band Bright Eyes.

LeMaster is gay.

== Album Appearances ==
See also Now It's Overhead

=== 1998 ===
- Bright Eyes – Letting off the Happiness (1998) – Saddle Creek Records – Production, Engineering, Performance
- Drive-By Truckers – Gangstabilly (1998) – Soul Dump Records/New West Records – Production, Engineering, Mixing
- Macha – Self-titled (1998) – Jetset Records – Engineering, Mixing
- Drip – Inside Job (1998) – Ghostmeat Records – Production, Engineering, Mixing, Performance, Writing

=== 1999 ===
- Macha – See It Another Way (1999) – Jetset Records – Engineering, Mixing
- Drive-By Truckers – Pizza Deliverance (1999) – Ghostmeat Records/New West Records – Mixing
- David Dondero – Pity Party (1999) – Ghostmeat Records – Production, Engineering, Mixing, Performance

=== 2000 ===
- Bright Eyes – Fevers and Mirrors (2000) – Saddle Creek Records – Engineering, Performance
- Lona – To the Nth (2000) – Ghostmeat Records – Production, Engineering, Mixing, Performance

=== 2001 ===
- Now It's Overhead – Self-titled (2001) – Saddle Creek Records – Production, Engineering, Mixing, Performance, Writing
- Bright Eyes – Oh Holy Fools: The Music of Son, Ambulance and Bright Eyes (2001) – Saddle Creek Records – Performance
- David Barbe – Comet of the Season (2001) – Backburner Records – Production, Assistant Engineering, Performance
- Seaworthy – Ride (2001) – Jetset Records – Production, Engineering, Mixing, Performance

=== 2002 ===
- Bright Eyes – Lifted or The Story is in the Soil, Keep Your Ear to the Ground (2002) – Saddle Creek Records – Engineering, String and Horn Arrangements, Performance
- Bright Eyes – There Is No Beginning to the Story (2002) – Saddle Creek Records – Engineering, Horn Arrangements, Performance
- Azure Ray – November EP (2002) – Saddle Creek Records – Production, Engineering, Mixing, Performance
- R.E.M. – R.E.M.I.X. (2002) – Warner Bros. Records – Production, Mixing, Performance
- Lovers – Starlit Sunken Ship (2002) – Orange Twin Records – Production, Engineering, Mixing, Performance
- Mayday – Old Blood (2002) – Saddle Creek Records – Performance

=== 2003 ===
- Azure Ray – Hold On Love (2003) – Saddle Creek Records – Production, Engineering, Mixing, Performance
- Azure Ray – The Drinks We Drank Last Night (2003) – Saddle Creek Records – Production, Engineering, Mixing
- Various Artists – Saddle Creek 50 (2003) – Saddle Creek Records – Production, Engineering, Mixing, Performance, Writing
- Pacific UV – Self-titled (2003) – Warm Records – Production, Engineering, Mixing, Performance
- The Few – Self-titled (2003) – PSB Records – Production, Engineering, Mixing, Performance

=== 2004 ===
- Now It's Overhead – Fall Back Open (2004) – Saddle Creek Records – Production, Engineering, Mixing, Performance, Writing
- Now It's Overhead – Wait In a Line (2004) – Saddle Creek Records – Production, Engineering, Mixing, Performance, Writing
- Macha – Forget Tomorrow (2004) – Jetset Records – Engineering, Mixing
- Azure Ray – New Resolution (2004) – Saddle Creek Records – Production, Engineering, Mixing
- Bright Eyes – Take It Easy (Love Nothing)) (2004) – Saddle Creek Records – Engineering
- Lovers – Gutter and the Garden (2004) – Orange Twin Records – Production, Engineering, Mixing, Performance
- The Good Life – Lovers Need Lawyers (2004) – Saddle Creek Records – Mixing

=== 2005 ===
- Bright Eyes – I'm Wide Awake, It's Morning (2005) · Saddle Creek Records – Performance
- Bright Eyes – Digital Ash in a Digital Urn (2005) – Saddle Creek Records – Production, Engineering, Performance
- Maria Taylor – 11:11 (2005) – Saddle Creek Records – Production, Engineering, Mixing, Performance
- Orenda Fink – Invisible Ones (2005) – Saddle Creek Records – Production, Engineering, Mixing, Performance
- Mayday – Bushido Karaoke (2005) – Saddle Creek Records – Mixing
- Various Artists – Lagniappe: A Saddle Creek Benefit for Hurricane Katrina (2005) – Saddle Creek Records – Production, Engineering, Mixing, Performance, Writing

=== 2006 ===
- Now It's Overhead – Dark Light Daybreak (2006) – Saddle Creek Records – Production, Engineering, Mixing, Performance, Writing
- Michael Stipe Featuring Chris Martin – In the Sun (Gulf Coast Relief) – EP (2006) – Warner Bros. Records – Engineering, Mixing
- Bright Eyes – Noise Floor (Rarities 1998–2005 (2006) – Saddle Creek Records – Performance

=== 2007 ===
- Maria Taylor – Lynn Teeter Flower (2007) – Saddle Creek Records – Production, Engineering, Mixing, Performance
- Now It's Overhead – Dark Light Daybreak (Live in the Studio EP (2007) – Saddle Creek Records – Production, Engineering, Mixing, Performance, Writing
- Bright Eyes – Four Winds (2007) – Saddle Creek Records – Performance
- Bright Eyes – Cassadaga (2007) – Saddle Creek Records – Performance
- Art In Manilla – Set the Woods On Fire (2007) – Saddle Creek Records – Mixing
- Mezzanine Owls – Slingshot Echoes (2007) – Mezzanine Owls Records – Production, Engineering, Mixing, Performance
- Summerbirds In the Cellar – With the Hands of the Hunter It All Becomes Dead (2007) – Slow January Records – Production, Engineering, Mixing, Performance

=== 2008 ===
- Conor Oberst – Self-titled (2008) – Merge Records – Engineering, Mixing, Performance
- Magnetic Morning – A.M. (2008) – Friend Or Faux Records – Engineering, Mixing
- Rig 1 – Above the Tree Line West of the Periodic (2008) – Team Love Records – Production, Engineering, Mixing, Performance
- The Fatales – Great Surround (2008) – Monopsone Records – Production, Engineering, Mixing
- Mezzanine Owls – Snowglobe – 7 Inch (2008) – Jaxart Records – Production, Engineering, Mixing

=== 2009 ===
- Conor Oberst and the Mystic Valley Band – Outer South (2009) – Merge Records – Engineering, Mixing, Performance
- Orenda Fink – Ask the Night (2009) – Saddle Creek Records – Engineering, Mixing, Performance
- Taylor Hollingsworth – Life With a Slow Ear (2009) – Team Love Records – Production, Engineering, Mixing, Performance
- Maria Taylor – LadyLuck (2009) – Nettwerk Records – Production, Engineering, Mixing, Performance, Writing
- Maria Taylor with Andy LeMaster – Savannah Drive (2009) – Nettwerk Records – Production, Engineering, Mixing, Performance, Writing
- Har Mar Superstar – Dark Touches (2009) – Dilettante – Mixing
- James Husband – A Parallax I (2009) – Polyvinyl Record Co. – Mixing

=== 2010 ===
- Elf Power – Elf Power (2010) – Orange Twin Records – Engineering, Mastering
- Azure Ray – Drawing Down the Moon (2010) – Saddle Creek Records – Performance, Additional Engineering
- Various Artists – Broken Hearts & Dirty Windows: Songs of John Prine (2010) – Oh Boy Records – Engineering, Mixing
- Venice Is Sinking – Sand & Lines (2010) – One Percent Press Records – Engineering
- New Idea Society – Somehow Disappearing (2010) – SHYE Records – Production, Engineering, Mixing, Performance

=== 2011 ===
- Bright Eyes – The People's Key (2011) – Saddle Creek Records – Engineering, Performance
- Drive-By Truckers – Ugly Buildings, Whores, and Politicians: Greatest Hits 1998-2009 (2011) – New West Records – Production, Engineering, Mixing
- Haroula Rose – These Open Roads (2011) – Production, Engineering, Mixing, Performance

=== 2012 ===
- Conor Oberst – One of My Kind (2012) – Team Love Records – Engineering, Performance
- Whispertown – Parallel (2012) – Acony Records – Production, Engineering, Mixing, Performance
- Conduits – Self-titled (2012) – Team Love Records – Mixing
- Azure Ray – As Above So Below (2012) – Saddle Creek Records – Production, Engineering, Mixing, Performance
- White Violet – Hiding, Mingling (2012) – Normaltown Records – Production, Engineering, Mixing, Performance
- The Casket Girls – Sleepwalking (2012) – Graveface Records – Mixing
- Patterson Hood – Heat Lightning Rumbles in the Distance (2012) – ATO Records – Engineering

=== 2013 ===
- Western Lows – Glacial (2013) – Jaxart Records – Production, Engineering, Mixing, Performance
- Alessi's Ark – The Still Life (2013) – Bella Union – Production, Engineering, Mixing, Performance
- Amanda Shires – Down Fell The Doves (2013) – Lightning Rod Records – Production, Engineering, Mixing, Performance
- Pacific UV – After the Dream You Are Awake (2013) – Mazarine Records – Mixing, Writing
- Lovers – A Friend in the World (2013) – Badman Recording Co. – Mixing
- Maria Taylor – Something About Knowing (2013) – Saddle Creek Records – Mixing
- Yip Deceiver – Medallius (2013) – New West Records – Mixing
- Shonna Tucker and Eye Candy – A Tell All (2013) – Sweet Nectar Records – Mixing
- Dead Confederate – In the Marrow (2013) – Spiderbomb Records – Engineering

=== 2014 ===
- The Casket Girls – True Love Kills the Fairy Tale (2014) – Graveface Records – Engineering, Mixing
- Conor Oberst – Upside Down Mountain (2014) – Nonesuch Records – Engineering, Performance
- Michael Stipe – The Cold Lands Soundtrack (2014) – Production, Engineering, Mixing, Performance
- Young Statues – The Flatlands Are Your Friend (2014) – Run for Cover Records – Production, Engineering, Performance

=== 2015 ===
- Yip Deceiver – YPD E.P. (2015) – New West Records – Engineering, Mixing
- Packway Handle Band / Jim White – Take It Like a Man (2015) – Yep Roc Records – Engineering, Performance
- Reptar – Lurid Glow (2015) – Joyful Noise Recordings – Production, Engineering, Mixing
- Des Ark – Everything Dies (2015) – Graveface Records – Mixing, Performance
- Thayer Sarrano – Shaky (2015) – Guildwater Group – Production, Engineering, Mixing, Performance
- Ruby the RabbitFoot & Yip Deceiver – Take a Bow/Crush – Single (2015) – Normaltown Records – Engineering, Mixing
- The Casket Girls + Stardeath and White Dwarfs – What Keeps You Up At Night – EP (2015) – Graveface Records – Engineering, Mixing

=== 2016 ===
- Ruby the RabbitFoot – Divorce Party (2016) – Normaltown Records – Production, Engineering, Performance, Mixing, Writing
- Bright Eyes – The Studio Albums 2000–2011 (2016) – Saddle Creek Records – Engineering, Performance
- Haroula Rose – Here the Blue River (2016) – Little Bliss Records – Production, Engineering, Performance
- The Casket Girls – The Night Machines (2016) – Graveface Records – Engineering, Mixing
- Maria Taylor – ‘’In the Next Life” (2016) – Flower Moon Records – Mixing

=== 2017 ===
- Black Kids – Rookie (2017) – Production, Engineering, Mixing
- Conor Oberst – Salutations (2017) – Nonesuch Records – Engineering, Mixing, Performance
- Nana Grizol – Ursa Minor (Nana Grizol album) (2017) – Orange Twin Records – Production, Engineering, Mixing
- Neighbor Lady – Maybe Later (2017) – Friendship Fever – Mixing
- Sandy Devastation – ‘’BDMF” (2017) – Production, Mixing

=== 2018 ===
- Glowworm – Can't Let Go (2018) – Post Dog Productions – Mixing
- Fischerspooner – SIR (2018) – Ultra Records – Engineering, Mixing, Performance, Writing
- Violet Delancey – Columbia Road (2018) – Production, Engineering, Mixing, Performance
- Thayer Sarrano – I Will Never Be Used To Your Beauty (2018) – Guildwater Group – Production, Engineering, Mixing, Performance
- Michael Stipe – Souris Calle – Souris Nocturne (2018) – Perrotin – Production, Engineering, Mixing, Performance, Writing
- Azure Ray – Waves (2018) – Flower Moon Records – Mixing
- The Glands – Double Coda (2018) – New West Records – Engineering, Mixing
- Sandy Devastation – Total Brooklyn Bitch (2018) – Production, Mixing

=== 2019 ===
- Better Oblivion Community Center – 'Self-titled (2019) – Dead Oceans – Production, Engineering, Performance
- LeeAnn Peppers – ‘’For Asha, With Hope” (2019) – Mixing
- Maria Taylor – Self-titled (2019) – Flower Moon Records – Mixing
- Sailors & Ships – Self-titled (2019) – Laser Brains – Mixing
- Polyenso – Year of the Dog – (2019) – Other People Records – Production, Engineering, Mixing, Performance
- Michael Stipe – Your Capricious Soul (2019) – Futurepicenter, Inc – Production, Engineering, Mixing, Performance, Writing

=== 2020 ===
- Bright Eyes – Down in the Weeds, Where the World Once Was (2020) – Dead Oceans – Performance
- Michael Stipe, Big Red Machine – No Time For Love Like Now (2020) – Engineering
- Michael Stipe – Drive to the Ocean (2020) – Futurepicenter, Inc – Production, Engineering, Mixing, Performance, Writing
- Polyenso – Red Colored Pencil – (2020) – Dog Radio – Engineering, Mixing
- Polyenso – Dust Devil – (2020) – Dog Radio – Production, Engineering, Mixing
- Polyenso – Lost in the Wheel / MissU – (2020) – Dog Radio – Engineering, Mixing

=== 2021 ===
- Timothy Ivan – Grayhair (2021) – Forasister Records – Production, Engineering, Mixing, Performance
- Polyenso – Pocket Knife Shadow – (2021) – Dog Radio – Engineering, Mixing
- Sunset Honor Unit – Self-titled EP – (2021) – Mixing
- Jason Isbell and the 400 Unit – ‘’Reverse‘’ – ‘’Georgia Blue‘’ – (2021) – Southeastern Records – Writing
- Michael Stipe – Sunday Morning – “I'll Be Your Mirror: A Tribute to The Velvet Underground & Nico” – (2021) – UMG Recordings, Inc. – Production, Engineering, Mixing, Performance
- Andy LeMaster – Joe Bell (Original Motion Picture Soundtrack) – (2021) – Lakeshore Records – Production, Engineering, Mixing, Performance, Writing

=== 2022 ===
- Night Palace – Diving Rings (2022) – Park the Van Records – Engineering
- Sandy Devastation – Polesmoker (2022) – Production, Mixing
- Georgia Marshall – Look At Me Now (2022) – Production, Engineering, Mixing, Performance, Writing
- Ruby the RabbitFoot – Like Doves and Roses (2022) – Aerobic International – Production, Engineering, Performance, Mixing, Writing
- Mykki Blanco, Michael Stipe – Family Ties – Stay Close To Music (2022) – Engineering
- Michael Stipe with Brian Eno – Future, If Future – Limited Edition Bioplastic 12 inch – (2022) – Earth Percent – Production, Engineering, Mixing, Performance, Writing

=== 2024 ===
- Pylon Reenactment Society – Magnet Factory – Strolling Bones Records
