= Album of the Year (The Good Life album) =

Studio album by The Good Life
- Released: August 10, 2004
- Recorded: August 2003–February 2004
- Genre: Indie rock
- Length: 53:22
- Label: Saddle Creek Records
- Producer: Mike Mogis

The Good Life chronology
Lovers Need Lawyers EP (2004)	Album of the Year (2004)	Help Wanted Nights (2007)

Professional ratings
Aggregate scores
Source	Rating
Metacritic	82/100
Review scores
Source	Rating
AllMusic	4.5/5 stars
Alternative Press	5/5 stars
Blender	3.5/5 stars
Filter	82%
NME	(9/10)
Pitchfork	(8/10)
Playlouder	3.5/5 stars
Rolling Stone	3/5 stars
Stylus	B−
Under the Radar	6/10

Album of the Year is the third album by The Good Life. The limited edition release includes a second disc with an acoustic version of the album. The enhanced CD comes with footage of videos recorded February 3, 2004, at O'Leavers in Omaha, Nebraska.

This album is the 64th release of Saddle Creek Records.

== Concept ==
The album is a concept record chronicling the end of a relationship and the emotions that come with it. The first track begins in April. The entire story is summarized in the first track, "Album of the Year." The main male character is dating a bartender, as referenced in the songs "Album of the Year" (She got a job at Jacob's/serving cocktails to the local drunks) and "Night and Day" (Night and day she tends to her bar/She pours the drinks, they pour out their hearts).

The first three songs talk mainly about the main character and his girlfriend, at the beginning of their relationship. "You're No Fool" is a glimpse into the ridicule the main character's girlfriend faces, as others speculate about her boyfriend's fidelity, and "Notes In His Pockets" lists several instances of his assumed unfaithfulness, as he cheats on her with ex-girlfriends and girls met in bars. These two songs do not explicitly say whether or not the infidelity actually occurred, leaving it to the listener to determine. "You're Not You" and "October Leaves" document the growing dissatisfaction with their relationship, from the point of view of the woman and the man, respectively. The relationship, at this point, is falling apart. At the end of "October Leaves", there is spoken word conversation between the man and woman, starting with the female's voice:
-Hey?
-Yes?
-Are you sleeping?
-No.
-Can I ask you something?
-Yes.
-Are you cheating on me?
-No.
-Are you lying?
"Lovers Need Lawyers" has the main character defending his actions, claiming that he did not cheat on his girlfriend, and drawing metaphors to feeling like he is 'on trial'. "Inmates" is primarily sung by the girlfriend character of the album, and constitutes the end of their relationship. (Well guess what? I'm leaving./I can't be your prisoner.). The last three tracks deal with the male protagonists's life, post-breakup. We learn that the female protagonist has moved on ("A New Friend") and that the main character hasn't spoken to his now ex-girlfriend in two years ("Two Years This Month").

== Critical reception ==
Album of the Year was met with "universal acclaim" reviews from critics. At Metacritic, which assigns a weighted average rating out of 100 to reviews from mainstream publications, the release received an average score of 82, based on 13 reviews.

== Track listing ==
1. "Album of the Year" – 5:10
  - Tim Kasher – vocals, guitar
  - Ryan Fox – guitar, twelve string
  - Stefanie Drootin – bass
  - Roger Lewis – drums
  - Mike Mogis – mandolin, wurlitzer, keyboards, optigan
  - Seth Stauffer – djembe, tambourine
  - Michael Opoku – djembe
2. "Night and Day" – 3:29
  - Tim Kasher – vocals, guitar, accordion
  - Stefanie Drootin – organ
  - Roger Lewis – drums
  - Mike Mogis – mandolin, wurlitzer, organ
  - Dan McCarthy – stand up bass
3. "Under a Honeymoon" – 4:52
  - Tim Kasher – vocals, guitar, accordion, organ
  - Ryan Fox – slide guitar
  - Stefanie Drootin – bass
  - Roger Lewis – drums, djembe, congas
  - Mike Mogis – finger cymbal, cabasa, wurlitzer, guitar
  - Seth Stauffer – djembe, doumbek
  - A.J. Mogis – tympani
  - Nate Walcott – trumpet, flugelhorn
4. "You're No Fool" – 3:50
  - Tim Kasher – vocals, guitar
  - Ryan Fox – piano, guitar, feedback
  - Roger Lewis – drums
  - Mike Mogis – wurlitzer, stomps, guitar
  - Dan McCarthy – stand up bass
  - A.J. Mogis – tympani, electric bass
  - Nate Walcott – trumpet, flugelhorn
5. "Notes in His Pocket" – 3:42
  - Tim Kasher – vocals, piano
  - Ryan Fox – guitars
  - Stefanie Drootin – bass
  - Roger Lewis – drums
  - Mike Mogis – wurlitzer, keyboards, guitar
6. "You're Not You" – 5:38
  - Tim Kasher – vocals, guitar, accordion
  - Ryan Fox – guitar
  - Stefanie Drootin – bass
  - Roger Lewis – drums, djembe
  - Mike Mogis – guitar
  - Seth Stauffer – djembe, congas, doumbek
  - Michael Opoku – talking drum
  - Amy Huffman – vocal chorus
7. "October Leaves" – 4:57
  - Tim Kasher – vocals, guitar, synth bass
  - Ryan Fox – guitar
  - Stefanie Drootin – electric piano
  - Roger Lewis – drums
  - Mike Mogis – keyboards, glockenspiel, optigan, loops, wurlitzer
8. "Lovers Need Lawyers" – 2:40
  - Tim Kasher – vocals, guitar
  - Ryan Fox – synths, piano, guitar
  - Stefanie Drootin – bass
  - Roger Lewis – drums, tambourine
  - Mike Mogis – keyboards, optigan, mellotron
9. "Inmates" – 9:39
  - Tim Kasher – vocals, guitar, organ
  - Ryan Fox – guitars
  - Stefanie Drootin – bass
  - Roger Lewis – drums
  - Seth Stauffer – djembe, congas
  - Mike Mogis – loops, keyboards, optigan, guitar, tambourine, shakers, dobro
  - Tiffany Kowalski – violin
  - Jiha Lee – vocals
  - Jenny Lewis – end vocals
10. "Needy" – 3:52
  - Tim Kasher – vocals, guitar
  - Ryan Fox – guitar, synth lead, backward guitars
  - Stefanie Drootin – bass
  - Roger Lewis – bass
  - Mike Mogis – loops, guitar, keyboards
  - Amy Huffman – vocal
11. "A New Friend" – 3:29
  - Tim Kasher – vocals, guitar
  - Ryan Fox – guitar
  - Stefanie Drootin – organ
  - Roger Lewis – drums
  - Mike Mogis – wurlitzer, loops, keyboards, sleigh bells
12. "Two Years This Month" – 2:12
  - Tim Kasher – vocal, guitar, arrangement
  - Mike Mogis – arrangement

== Credits ==
=== The Good Life ===
- Tim Kasher – Vocals, Guitars, Keyboards, Accordion, Bass, Arrangement
- Ryan Fox – Guitars, Keyboards, Synths
- Stefanie Drootin – Bass, Keyboards
- Roger Lewis – Drums, Percussion, Bass

=== Guests ===
- Amy Huffman – Vocals
- Tiffany Kowalski – Violin
- Jiha Lee – Vocals
- Jenny Lewis – Vocals
- Daniel J. McCarthy – Bass
- A.J. Mogis – Percussion, Bass
- Mike Mogis – Keyboards, Guitars, Percussion, Loops, Mandolin, Dobro, Glockenspiel, Arrangement
- Michael Opoku – Percussion
- Seth Stauffer – Percussion
- Nate Walcott – Trumpet, Flugelhorn
