= Greyday Productions =

Greyday Productions, sometimes called simply Greyday Records, is an independent record label based in Portland, Oregon, United States. Formed to release a new record from Still Life, Greyday is operated mainly by Todd Berry (who moved to Portland from Los Angeles in 2001). Greyday Records is distributed by Burnside Distribution Corporation.

== Artists ==
- Books on Tape
- Bronwyn
- Consafos
- Head of Femur
- I Was Totally Destroying It
- Leaving Rouge
- Mayday
- Piney Gir
- Piney Gir Country Roadshow
- Patrick Porter
- Southerly
- Still Life
- The Trophy Fire

== Greydawn Records ==
Greydawn is operated by Greyday Records in Portland, Oregon. It is a collective of independent and self-releasing artists.

Bands:

- The Mouse That Roared

== See also ==
- List of companies based in Oregon
- List of record labels
