= Black Out (The Good Life album) =

Studio album by The Good Life
- Released: March 4, 2002
- Genre: Indie rock
- Length: 50:08
- Label: Saddle Creek Records
- Producer: Mike Mogis

The Good Life chronology
Novena on a Nocturn (2000)	Black Out (2002)	Lovers Need Lawyers (2004)

Professional ratings
Review scores
Source	Rating
Allmusic	4/5 stars

Black Out is the second album by Omaha indie rock band The Good Life. It was released on March 4, 2002 by Saddle Creek Records. It contains 14 songs, running approximately 50:08.

Many of the songs deal with the aftermath of the bitter divorce that Tim Kasher experienced. Much of his divorce is also documented on the 2000 Cursive album Domestica.

The album Black Out was referred to in the song "Nothing Gets Crossed Out," on Bright Eyes's 2002 album Lifted: Yeah, Tim, I heard your album and it's better than good./When we get off tour I think we should hang and Black Out together...

This album is the 43rd release of Saddle Creek Records.

== Track listing ==
1. "Black Out" – 1:35
2. "Beaten Path" – 3:00
3. "Some Bullshit Escape" – 4:23
4. "O'Rourke's, – 1:20 A.M." – 5:22
5. "Early Out the Gate" – 4:10
6. "New Denial" – 2:57
7. "Black Out" – 1:12
8. "I Am an Island" – 2:29
9. "Drinking with the Girls" – 5:02
10. "After O'Rourke's, – 2:10 A.M." – 2:53
11. "Empty Bed" – 4:31
12. "Don't Make Love So Hard" – 6:26
13. "Off the Beaten Path" – 4:57
14. "Black Out" – 1:11
