= Lynn Teeter Flower =

Studio album by Maria Taylor
- Released: March 6, 2007
- Genre: Folk rock
- Length: 38:24
- Label: Saddle Creek

Maria Taylor chronology
11:11 (2005)	Lynn Teeter Flower (2007)	LadyLuck (2009)

Professional ratings
Aggregate scores
Source	Rating
Metacritic	65/100 link
Review scores
Source	Rating
Rolling Stone	link
Contact Music	link
AllMusic	link
Twisted Ear	link

Lynn Teeter Flower is the second album by Maria Taylor and was released on March 6, 2007. This is the 102nd release of Saddle Creek Records. The album features a guest appearance and co-write from Bright Eyes' Conor Oberst on the track "The Ballad of Sean Foley" in addition to contributions from Jim Eno of Spoon, Andy LeMaster, and Doug Easley (Cat Power). Rolling Stone said that album "offers thoughtful, pretty singer-songwriter fare with spare, delicate backup and dashes of Seventies navel-gazing."

The album's title came from a childhood song made up by Taylor. "My dad had a friend name Lynn and he had a flower shop called Lynn Teeter Flowers. That recording was just me when I was little — I’d always sing and make up words to songs. And the story behind how I chose it as the title is that I had finished the album but didn’t have a name for it. I was with friends and we were trying to figure out the title really late at night. Then my dad e-mailed me the song and said, “Look what I just found!” When I heard it, I thought, “There it is! There’s the title.” I just thought it sounded cool," Taylor said in a 2008 interview.

== Track listing ==
1. "A Good Start" – 4:13
2. "Clean Getaway" – 3:10
3. "Smile and Wave" – 2:35
4. "No Stars" – 4:45
5. "Replay" – 5:09
6. "Small Part of Me" – 4:18
7. "Irish Goodbye" – 3:24
8. "My Own Fault" – 2:53
9. "The Ballad of Sean Foley" – 3:57
10. "Lost Time" – 2:49
11. "Lynn Teeter Flower" – 1:12

== TV Placements ==
- "No Stars" is used in the One Tree Hill episode "You Call It Madness, But I Call It Love".
- "Small Part of Me" is used in the Greek episode "Separation Anxiety".
- "Irish Goodbye" is used in the Privileged episode "All About the Big Picture".
- "Clean Getaway" and "A Good Start" are used in the Grey's Anatomy episode "Time After Time".
- "Clean Getaway" is used in the Hart of Dixie episode "A Better Man".
