= The Good Life (band) =

American indie rock band

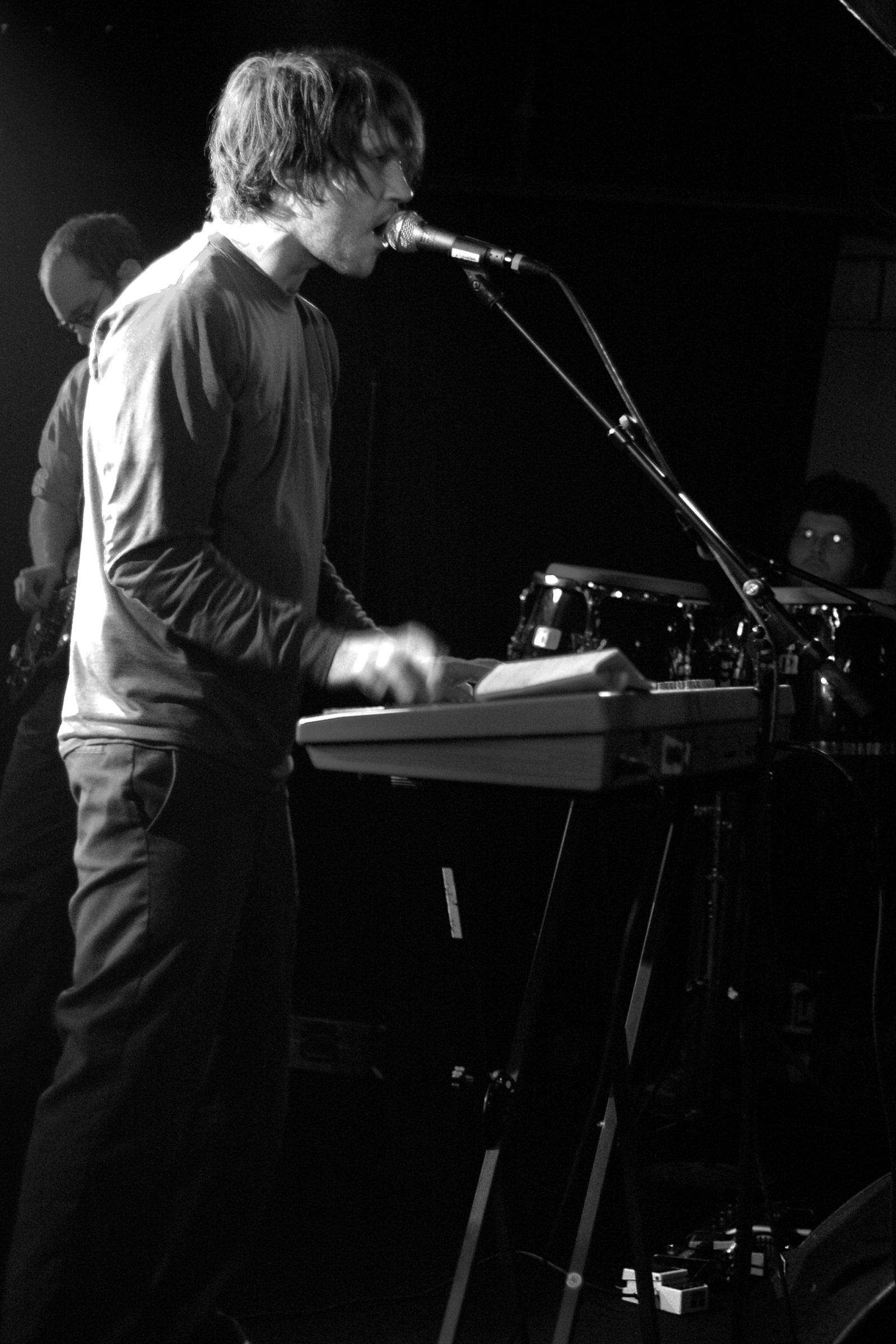
- Tim Kasher, lead singer for The Good Life

Background information
- Origin: Omaha, Nebraska, United States
- Genre: Indie rock • indie pop • folk rock • emo • indietronica
- Years active: 2000–present
- Labels: Saddle Creek, Better Looking
- Members: Tim Kasher; Stefanie Drootin; Ryan Fox; Roger Lewis
- Past members: Jiha Lee; Landon Hedges; Mike Heim

The Good Life is an indie rock band on Saddle Creek Records.

Started as a solo project of Cursive's frontman Tim Kasher, The Good Life quickly grew to become its own established group. The original intent of The Good Life was to provide Tim Kasher with a vehicle to perform songs that did not fit stylistically in with his long-running band Cursive. Kasher fronts the group and plays the part of the singer/songwriter. The other members of the band include Stefanie Drootin, Ryan Fox, and Roger Lewis.

The Good Life has its core in those four musicians, but besides Kasher can be a rotating cast of characters involving many from Saddle Creek Records. The band's name came from the original state slogan for Nebraska, the home of Kasher and Saddle Creek, before 2003, when the slogan was changed.

The Good Life released their fifth album, Everybody's Coming Down, on August 14, 2015.

The band's music is considered to be more mellow than the music of Cursive. The band's lyrics are considered to be introspective and sentimental in nature. Their music has been compared to English artists such as the Cure, Morrissey, and Orchestral Manoeuvers in the Dark.

== Band members ==
Current members

- Tim Kasher – vocals, guitars, keyboards
- Stefanie Drootin – bass
- Ryan Fox – saxophone, keyboards, guitars, bass
- Roger Lewis – drums

Former members

- Jiha Lee – keyboards, vocals
- Landon Hedges – guitars, bass
- Mike Heim – keyboards

== Discography ==
=== Albums ===
List of studio albums, with selected chart positions
Title	Album details	Peak chart positions	
Title	Album details	US	US Indie
Novena on a Nocturn	Released: November 10, 2000; Label: Better Looking	—	—
Black Out	Released: March 4, 2002; Label: Saddle Creek	—	—
Album of the Year	Released: August 10, 2004; Label: Saddle Creek	—	38
Help Wanted Nights	Released: September 11, 2007; Label: Saddle Creek	195	27
Everybody's Coming Down	Released: August 14, 2015; Label: Saddle Creek	—	—
"—" denotes releases that did not chart.

=== Singles and EPs ===
- Lovers Need Lawyers (2004 · Saddle Creek Records) - EP
- Heartbroke (2007 · Saddle Creek Records) - 7" single

=== Compilations ===
- Holiday Matinee, No. 2 (2000 · Better Looking Records)

song: "Tell Shipwreck I'm Sorry"

- NE vs. NC (2002 · Redemption Recording Co.)

songs: "I Am an Island," "Off the Beaten Path"

- Saddle Creek 50 (2003 · Saddle Creek Records)

songs: "I Am an Island," "Aftercrash"

- Amos House Collection (2003 · Wishing Tree)

song: "Haunted Homecoming"

- Not One Light Red: A Desert Extended (2003 · Sunset Alliance)

song: "Thin Walls Between Us"

- Comes With a Smile#12 - Bonus Disk (2004 · Comes With a Smile)

song: "Grandma's Gone"

- Lagniappe: A Saddle Creek Benefit for Hurricane Katrina (2005 · Saddle Creek Records)

song: "New Year's Retribution"

== Videography ==
- Lovers Need Lawyers (2005, directed by Nik Fackler)
- Heartbroke (2007, directed by Alan Tanner and Rob Walters)

Orenda Fink appeared in the music video for Lovers Need Lawyers.

== See also ==
- The '89 Cubs
- Bright Eyes
- Consafos
- Cursive
- Neva Dinova
