= Maria Taylor (musician) =

American singer-songwriter (born 1976)

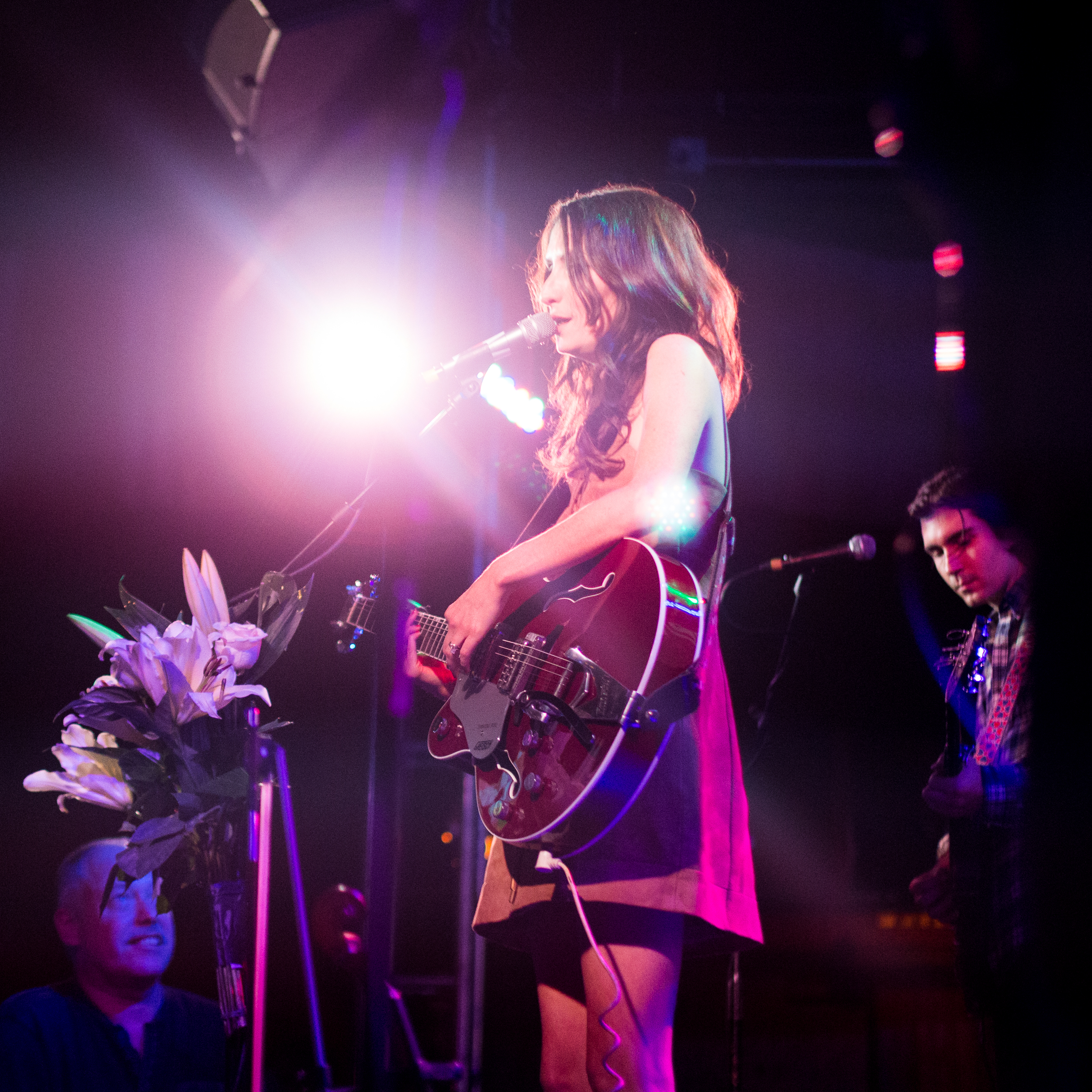
- Taylor performing at the Troubadour in Los Angeles, CA, in 2016.

Background information
- Born: Maria Diane Taylor; May 21, 1976 (age 50); Birmingham, Alabama, U.S.
- Genres: Indie rock, folk rock
- Occupation: Singer-songwriter
- Instruments: Vocals, guitar, drums, piano
- Labels: Saddle Creek; Flower Moon Records; Nettwerk Music Group
- Website: mariataylormusic.com

Maria Diane Taylor (born May 21, 1976) is an American singer-songwriter from Birmingham, Alabama. She is also a member of the duo Azure Ray with Orenda Fink. Taylor plays several instruments, including the guitar, drums, and piano and has collaborated or performed with such artists as Bright Eyes, Phoebe Bridgers, Moby, Michael Stipe of R.E.M., Joshua Radin, and more.

== Biography ==
=== Early career ===
Taylor started her musical career at the age of 15 in the band Little Red Rocket with Orenda Fink, which released two CDs on Geffen, Who Did You Pay (1997) and It's in the Sound (2000). The group disbanded during the merging of Geffen with Universal Music Group.

=== Formation of Azure Ray ===
Taylor later moved to Athens, Georgia, along with her musical collaborator, Fink, and there they formed the band Azure Ray. The pair signed to WARM and released their self-titled debut in 2001. The song "Sleep" was later featured in the 2006 Academy Award-nominated movie, The Devil Wears Prada featuring Anne Hathaway. In 2015, Taylor Swift included "Sleep" in a six-song "breakup playlist" made for a fan via her official Tumblr. Azure Ray released their second album, Burn and Shiver in 2002. Eric Bachmann (Crooked Fingers and Archers of Loaf) produced both records. After meeting the band in Athens, Bright Eyes frontman Conor Oberst invited the band on tour and introduced them to Saddle Creek. Saddle Creek released their following records, November EP, and The Drinks We Drank Last Night. In 2002, the duo co-wrote and recorded "The Great Escape" (which appeared on Moby's 18) and "Landing" (which appeared on the XXX soundtrack), and afterward joined Moby on tour. Following the release of 2003's Hold on Love, Taylor and Fink began a six-year hiatus.

=== Launch of solo efforts ===
Taylor released her first solo album 11:11 on Saddle Creek Records on May 24, 2005. The album features Conor Oberst of Bright Eyes, Gretta Cohn of Cursive, Andy LeMaster and Mike Mogis as both musicians and producers. Grey's Anatomy named its March 31, 2011, episode, "Song Beneath the Song", after a track from the album and also featured the song on the original soundtrack. Taylor later recorded a new song for Grey's Anatomy's 2005 Christmas episode entitled "Christmas After All." Her second solo album, Lynn Teeter Flower, was released on March 6, 2007, also on Saddle Creek. "A Good Start", the first track off Lynn Teeter Flower, was subsequently named one of NPR's 10 best songs of the year for 2007. "The Ballad of Sean Foley" was co-written with Conor Oberst. The following year she released an acoustic album titled Savannah Drive with Andy LeMaster, which includes stripped-down versions of songs from her first two albums, plus one new track, "Tell Me". On March 31, 2009, she released her third full-length, LadyLuck, via Nettwerk Music Group featuring the song "Cartoons and Forever Plans", co-written by and including guest vocals from R.E.M.'s Michael Stipe. LadyLuck reached number 48 on Billboard's "Heatseakers" charts.

=== Azure Ray reunion and more ===
Azure Ray then reunited for a one-off reunion show in December 2008 at Los Angeles's iconic Troubadour. In 2010, they released their first album in six years, Drawing Down the Moon.

Overlook, Taylor's 4th solo album, was released August 16, 2011. After moving back to her hometown of Birmingham, Taylor was unable to write for nearly a year, eventually composing the entire album over two weeks during a break in touring with Azure Ray. This release marks the first time Taylor produced her own album. Paste called Overlook "her best, most animated collection in years."

In August 2012, Rolling Stone premiered the new EP from Azure Ray, As Above, So Below. It was released on September 4, 2012, on Saddle Creek Records. The next year, Taylor released her fifth solo record Something About Knowing on October 29, 2013, on Saddle Creek Records.

=== Return to Los Angeles and Flower Moon Records ===
After moving back to Los Angeles, Taylor wrote and recorded In the Next Life, released December 9, 2016, on her own label, Flower Moon Records. The album features guest appearances from familiar collaborators Joshua Radin, Conor Oberst and more. "If Only" (featuring Oberst) was prominently featured in NBC's This Is Us. NPR, who premiered the full album stream, called it "her warmest and most affecting album... filled with gorgeous, touching songs about family, legacy, fear and the pursuit of contentment."

In November 2017, Taylor joined Ben Lee, Mike Watt, Joey Waronker and others as Daniel Johnston's backing band during the Los Angeles stop of his final tour. That same month, Azure Ray announced they would once again reunite for a one-off show in Los Angeles at the Lodge Room on January 20, 2018.

In April 2018, Paste premiered "Real Life (Trump Era)" from the Friends and Family Vol. 1 compilation, put out on her label, Flower Moon Records. Released May 11, 2018, other contributors included Azure Ray bandmate Orenda Fink, Nik Freitas, Louis Schefano, Jake Bellows, and more. Flower Moon Records has since re-released Taylor's earlier albums, 11:11 and LadyLuck, as well as Azure Ray's self-titled record and Burn and Shiver.

Taylor performed on The Ellen Show with Joshua Radin during his performance of "Here, Right Now" in October 2019. On November 11, 2019, Taylor released her new self-titled album on Flower Moon Records. Flood Magazine premiered the single "Waiting in Line" featuring Counting Crows' Adam Duritz on October 24, 2019. Under the Radar premiered the Alan Tanner directed video for "Spinning Wheel" on January 22, 2020.

In 2021, Azure Ray announced their first new album in over a decade, Remedy. In March 2021, Taylor was featured on Phoebe Bridgers cover of the John Prine song "Summer's End" for the Spotify Singles series. She also appears on Bridgers' cover of "Funny Feeling" by Bo Burnham.

Taylor appears on multiple tracks from Bright Eyes' 2022 Companion reissue series, including the I'm Wide Awake, It's Morning tracks "First Day of My Life" and "We Are Nowhere and It's Now." Bright Eyes also covered Azure Ray's "November" on the LIFTED Or The Story Is In The Soil, Keep Your Ear To The Ground Companion version. She joined the band as their drummer during Bright Eyes' 2023 world tour of the United States, Mexico, Australia and New Zealand. In 2023, Taylor also penned the original song entitled "Everything I Wanted" for Season 1 of the Hallmark Channel's series The Way Home.

== Personal life ==
Taylor plays with the high E-string removed from her guitar. Taylor previously dated Bright Eyes singer-songwriter Conor Oberst. The Bright Eyes song "First Day of My Life" was written about Taylor. She was married and has two children.

== Discography ==
=== Solo ===
- 11:11 (2005, Flower Moon Records)
- Lynn Teeter Flower (2007, Saddle Creek)
- Savannah Drive (with Andy LeMaster) (2008, Flower Moon Records)
- LadyLuck (2009, Flower Moon Records)
- "In a Bad Way" single (2011, Saddle Creek)
- Overlook (2011, Saddle Creek)
- Something About Knowing (2013, Saddle Creek)
- In the Next Life (2016, Flower Moon Records)
- "Light of the World" single with Louis Schefano (2017, Flower Moon Records)
- Maria Taylor (2019, Flower Moon Records)
- Story's End (2026, Million Stars Records)

=== Azure Ray ===
- Azure Ray (2001, Flower Moon Records)
- Sleep EP (2002, WARM)
- Burn and Shiver (2002, Flower Moon Records)
- November EP (2002, Saddle Creek)
- Hold on Love (2003, Saddle Creek)
- The Drinks We Drank Last Night (2003, Saddle Creek)
- New Resolution (2004, Saddle Creek)
- Drawing Down the Moon (2010, Saddle Creek)
- As Above So Below (2012, Saddle Creek)
- Waves EP (2018, Flower Moon Records)
- Remedy (2021, Flower Moon Records)

=== Compilations ===
- Grey's Anatomy – Official Soundtrack (2005, Touchstone Pictures)
- Lagniappe: A Saddle Creek Benefit for Hurricane Katrina Relief (2005, Saddle Creek)
- Grey's Anatomy – Official Soundtrack Vol. 1, 2, & 3 (2009)
- This Is Us – Music from the Series (2017, Universal Music/Twentieth Century Fox)
- Flower Moon Records – Friends and Family Volume 1 (2018, Flower Moon Records)

=== Appearances ===
- Bright Eyes – There Is No Beginning to the Story (2002, Saddle Creek)
- Bright Eyes – Lifted or The Story Is in the Soil, Keep Your Ear to the Ground (2002, Saddle Creek)
- Bright Eyes – A Christmas Album (2002 · Saddle Creek)
- Bright Eyes – I'm Wide Awake, It's Morning (2005, Saddle Creek)
- Bright Eyes – Digital Ash in a Digital Urn (2005, Saddle Creek)
- Bright Eyes – Noise Floor (2006, Saddle Creek)
- Bright Eyes – Four Winds (2007, Saddle Creek)
- Bright Eyes – Cassadaga (2007, Saddle Creek)
- Joshua Radin – "When You Find Me," Adam (Original Motion Picture Soundtrack) (2009)
- Rich Shapero – Dawn Remember (2010, Outside Reading)
- Nik Freitas – Saturday Night Underwater (2011, Little Record Company)
- Whispertown – Parallel (2012, Acony Records)
- Conor Oberst – Salutations (2017, Nonesuch Records)
- Nik Freitas – Day & Dark (2018)
- Joshua Radin – "Here, Right Now" (2019, Nettwerk)
- Ben Lee – Quarter Century Classix (2019, New West Records)
- Phoebe Bridgers – "Summers End (John Prine cover) (2021, Spotify Singles)
- Phoebe Bridgers – "That Funny Feeling" (Bo Burhan cover) (2021, Dead Oceans)
- Bright Eyes – I'm Wide Awake, It's Morning (Companion version) (2022, Dead Oceans)

== Music videos ==
- "Song Beneath The Song" (11:11)
- "A Good Start" (Lynn Teeter Flower)
- "Time Lapse Lifeline" (LadyLuck) – featuring Neely Jenkins (of Tilly and the Wall) and Morgan Nagler (of Whispertown), directed by Alan Tanner
- "Cartoons and Forever Plans" (LadyLuck) – featuring actor/singer Soko and was directed by SKINNY (Directing Team)
- "Matador" (Overlook)
- "Up All Night" (Something About Knowing) – directed by Alan Tanner,
- "If Only" (In the Next Life) – featuring Conor Oberst and Louis Schefano
- "Just Once" (In the Next Life) – featuring Nik Freitas, Jake Bellows of Neva Dinova and more.
- "Light of the World" (with Louis Schefano)
- "Spinning Wheel" (Maria Taylor) – directed by Alan Tanner

Maria is also featured playing drums in the video for "Four Winds" by Bright Eyes and "New Drinks for the Old Drunk" by Crooked Fingers.
