= Neva Dinova =

American indie band

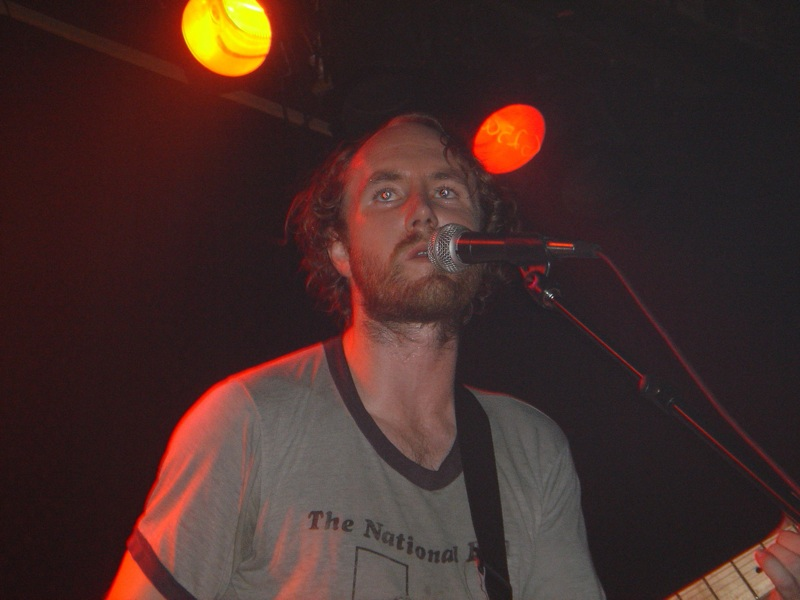
Frontman Jake Bellows in 2005

Neva Dinova is an indie band from Omaha, Nebraska, formed in 1993 "at the height of the slowcore movement" by guitarist/singer-songwriter Jake Bellows and bassist Heath Koontz. The band is named after Jake Bellows's grandmother. They were initially on Crank! A Record Company, where they released their debut album Neva Dinova in 2002, followed by a collaborative split EP with Bright Eyes entitled One Jug of Wine, Two Vessels in 2004 and their second album The Hate Yourself Change in 2005. The band's third album You May Already Be Dreaming was released in 2008 on Saddle Creek Records. The group subsequently dissolved, playing their last show in 2009.

Saddle Creek reissued the 2004 EP One Jug of Wine, Two Vessels in 2010, with four new tracks. In August 2013, frontman Jake Bellows released his solo debut album New Ocean on Saddle Creek. Neva Dinova's next performance came in December 2014. In 2022, the group released their "rarities collection" Demos And C-Sides. In 2023, they released two new songs, "Something's Out There" and "Outside".

Neva Dinova's music is "dreamy and sparse, delicate and moody", containing elements of folk, psychedelia, rock, acoustic, and country. They are known for having small and intimate live shows.

Drummer Roger Lewis is also the drummer for fellow Saddle Creek band The Good Life. Bellows remained a key associate with Bright Eyes and contributed to their 2007 album Cassadaga.

== Discography ==
=== Albums ===
- Neva Dinova (2002) Released on Crank! A Record Company.
- The Hate Yourself Change (2005) Released on Crank! A Record Company. Licensed to Sidecho Records.
- You May Already Be Dreaming (2008) Released April 8, 2008, on Saddle Creek Records.
- Neva Dinova (2009 Reissue with additional songs) Released on Saddle Creek Records.
- Live at Slowdown (2010) (Solo set) Released December 18, 2010 on Jake Bellows's website.
- Demos and C-Sides (2022) Released on August 19, 2022, on Saddle Creek Records.
- Canary (2024) Released on September 27, 2024, on Saddle Creek Records.

=== Singles and EPs ===
- Race for Titles/Neva Dinova Split 7" (2002) Released on Redemption Recording co.
- One Jug of Wine, Two Vessels (2004) (a collaborative effort with Bright Eyes) Released on Crank! A Record Company.
- One Jug of Wine, Two Vessels (2010 Reissue with additional songs) Released on Saddle Creek Records.

== Band members ==
- Heath Koontz – bass/keyboards
- Jake Bellows – guitar/vocals
- Mike Kratky – guitar/bartender
- Tim Haes – guitar
- Roger Lewis – drums
- Bo Anderson — drums
