= The Enright House discography =

- Studio albums: 1
- Extended plays: 5
- Compilation albums: 1
- Singles: 3
- Music videos: 4

The discography of The Enright House, a post-rock band based in Christchurch, New Zealand, consists of one studio album, one compilation album, five extended plays, one single and four music videos.

== Studio albums ==
Year	Album details
2007	A Maze and Amazement: Released: May 2007; Label: A Low Hum (#HUM031); Formats: CD, digital download

== Compilation albums ==
Year	Album details
2008	Remixes and Collaborations: Released: 1 November 2008; Label: Self-released; Formats: Digital download

== Extended plays ==
Year	Album details
2006	Broken Hands: Released: 2006; Label: A Low Hum (HUM021); Formats: CD-R
2008	Six Acoustic Renditions: Released: 14 January 2008; Label: Sleepy Bedroom Operations (SLEEP 001); Formats: CD-R, digital download

=== Split EPs ===
Year	Album details	Other artist
2007	The Enright House Versus Kill the Zodiac: Released: 2007; Label: A Low Hum (HUM025); Formats: CD-R	Kill the Zodiac
2008	Cat and Bird: Released: 1 April 2008; Label: Sleepy Bedroom Operations (SLEEP 002); Formats: 7-inch, digital download	Break Mission Kills
2009	Together: Released: 1 April 2009; Label: Mine, All Mine! (mam071); Formats: CD-R, digital download	Pushmi-Pullyu

== Singles ==
Year	Song	Peak chart positions	Album
Year	Song	RDU-FM	Album
2009	"Elektra" (live)	—	Non-album single
2010	"Darkwave in Slow Motion" (live)	—	Non-album single
2010	"Crazy? Yes! Dumb? No! (Enright House Remix)"	1	Non-album single
"—" denotes releases that did not chart.

=== Other charted songs ===
The following are songs by The Enright House that have charted, but were not released as a single.

Year	Song	Peak chart positions		Album
Year	Song	NZ Alt Radio	Kiwi FM	Album
2007	"Darkwave = MC Squared"	8	1	A Maze and Amazement
2007	"We Might as Well Have Stayed Young"	5	—	A Maze and Amazement
"—" denotes songs that did not chart.

== Music videos ==
Year	Title	Director
2007	"Darkwave = MC Squared"	Lauren Simpson and Michael Losure
2007	"Solitare"	Ed Lust
2008	"Scattering the Sun Like Gunshot"	Daniel Batkin-Smith
2009	"We Might as Well Have Stayed Young"	Ryan Alexander Lloyd and David Rusanow
