= A Low Hum =

New Zealand record label

A Low Hum is the ongoing project founded by photographer and music impresario Blink (born Ian Jorgensen), and is based in Wellington, New Zealand. Under the umbrella A LOW HUM, Blink organises tours, releases records, makes music videos, organises one-off events/festivals and publishes magazines and books. As of 2009, A Low Hum has organised and supported tours for over seventy musical acts from New Zealand, United States, Australia and beyond.

== History ==
In 2006, tours occurred every month and comprised between two and four rising Kiwi bands who played venues and gigs in about a dozen New Zealand locales along the way. In conjunction with each tour, A Low Hum published an A5 magazine, usually including a feature album or EP (often unreleased material by bands) and a music compilation CD with songs by local and international acts.

In 2006, A Low Hum also began publishing "Local Knowledge", a comprehensive guide for bands wanting to tour New Zealand and engage with the music industry.

In 2007, A Low Hum entered new territory as the producer of a major new live music festival, Camp A Low Hum (CALH), held on a large rural campsite close to Wainuiomata, 30 minutes drive north of Wellington. Attended by an intimate 350 campers, 49 bands performed 3, 4 and 5 February. In 2008 the festival spanned a total of four days featuring over 60 bands and doubling in audience numbers to around 700, according to Blink, the maximum capacity. The 2009 event sold out a month before the event, though capacity was limited to only 800 people. The 2010 event has been renamed Campus A Low Hum and has relocated to an unused agricultural college outside the town of Bulls in the North Island. Regarding changes to the format of the festival, Blink has said:

I have retained everything that was special about the Camp A Low Hum philosophy: intimate performances, small crowds, multiple environments, renegade performances, no band announcements, multiple performances by bands, spontaneous party action – and taken it bak 2 skool and added a whole bunch of new concepts to make it a brand new experience.

In 2007, after having released music for a few years in conjunction with its magazine, A Low Hum ventured further into the territories of a traditional record label by starting a monthly subscription-based CDR singles club and releasing albums by local New Zealand artists, Disasteradio, Over the Atlantic and The Enright House.

In 2008, A Low Hum released a trilogy of free digital download EPs by up and coming NZ recordings artists; Secret Knives, Mount Pleasant and Red Steers

In 2009 Blink from A Low Hum tour managed Disasteradio around the World as well as worked on the next phase of his music festival series, renamed to Campus A Low Hum

In 2010 Blink is working on a documentary of the first three Camps, and is working on the follow-up to his 2006 book "Local Knowledge" April 2010, A Low Hum announced it would shift from CDs to digital releases moving forward.

In 2011, Blink released his follow-up to "Local Knowledge", titled "D.I.Y Touring the World". The print edition is sold out, but the digital edition is still available from the A Low Hum website.

In November 2011, A Low Hum organised and promoted the Flying Nun 30th Anniversary celebrations with 30 huge shows across the country in one month.

From 2012 to 2014 Blink ran Wellington live music venue "Puppies" which was on the corner of Tory and Vivian Streets.

In 2013, A Low Hum ran "Square Wave Festival", an electronic music festival featuring 70 artists playing 30 shows throughout New Zealand in 6 venues throughout November

In 2014 after closing Puppies, Blink, now returning to using his birth name released another book titled "The Problem with Music in New Zealand and How To Fix It and Why I started and ran Puppies", the book received widespread press in NZ and one of the essays bought about a response from APRA/AMCOS NZ who published their response on their website.

After eight such festivals, in 2014, A Low Hum finished Camp A Low Hum with a final event at Camp Wainui in Wainuiomata, Wellington

In 2015, A Low Hum published a box set of ten books of Ian's photographs of the New Zealand music scene over 15 years from 2000 to 2015, this was called A Movement, this box-set was released with a 25-date national release tour including a mini-festival.

In 2015, A Low Hum began working with Wellington inventor and engineer Rohan Hill and helped take his invention, The Deluge, successfully to an international audience. Nominated in 2017 by MusicTech magazine for their "Best new drum machines and samplers" list. The Deluge is a portable synthesizer, sequencer and sampler used my musicians all over the world including notable acts such as Hans-Peter Lindstrøm whose use of the Deluge is his first time not using Ableton for his live sets.

In 2015, Calling on his experience, Ian began teaching events, touring and media at Massey University in Wellington as part of the Bachelor of Commercial Music program.

In 2015, A Low Hum toured Wellington based band Shocking Pinks around the world as well as re-releasing their debut album. While on tour A Low Hum made, along with Ash Smith, a 6-part web series called "D.I.Y Touring the World" for "The Wireless", a visual companion to the book he'd released years earlier. Ian was interviewed by Chinese blog Kiwiese while there with Shocking Pinks.

NYE 2014/2015, A Low Hum hosted a small two-day music festival at Crossing Backpackers in Ohakune called "A Low Hum House" A short-film edited and directed by Ian called "A Low Hum House" was released showing all the bands who played at the event.

In 2016, A Low Hum held a two-night 15-year anniversary party called "15 Years of A Low Hum", returning to Tatum Park in Levin over the NYE period.

In 2018, A Low Hum organised and promoted the "Where's My Room" national tour featuring Neil and Liam Finn.

According to a list on the A Low Hum website, as of February 2018, A Low Hum has promoted 560 events in New Zealand.

== A LOW HUM Tours ==
Bands whom Blink/A Low Hum have toured around NZ and the World:

- Degrees K & Ejector (September 2003)
- Batrider (April 2004)
- Ghostplane (May 2004)
- The Fanatics and Disasteradio (June 2004)
- Degrees K (July 2004)
- The Accelerants (August 2004)
- The Phoenix Foundation, Cassette, Phelps and Munro (October 2004)
- Cortina, Coolies, Disasteradio, Golden Axe (November 2004)
- Gerling (December 2004)
- Shocking Pinks, The Inkling (March 2005)
- Connan and the Mockasins, The Chandeliers, Hot Swiss Mistress (April 2005)
- Ghostplane, Mestar (August 2005)
- So So Modern, Teen Wolf (November 2005)
- Die! Die! Die!, French Horns, Yokel Ono, The Vacants (February 2006)
- Connan and the Mockasins, Whipping Cats, Gran Prix (March 2006)
- The Reduction Agents, Over the Atlantic, The Undercurrents (April 2006)
- Disasteradio, Kill Surf City, Voom (May 2006)
- The Sneaks, The Shaky Hands, Thought Creature (June 2006)
- Jakob, Operation Rolling Thunder, City City City (August 2006)
- So So Modern, Collapsing Cities, Alps, Frase+Bri (September 2006)
- The Ruby Suns, Odessa, The Bengal Lights (October 2006)
- Rock and Roll Machine, The Mysterious Tapeman, The Bloody Souls, Don Julio and the Hispanic Mechanic (November 2006)
- Ghosptlane, Signer, Phelps and Munro, Diasasteradio, Frase+Bri (December 2006)
- So So Modern, My Disco, Disasteradio, Frase+Bri (February 2007)
- The Evens (February 2007)
- So So Modern, Cut Off Your Hands (July 2007)
- Yacht, Panther (August 2007)
- The Enright House, Thought Creature, Little Pictures (band), Get Set Play (September 2007)
- Disasteradio (October 2007)
- Over the Atlantic (April–September 2008) – World Tour – US, England, Scotland, France, Germany, Luxembourg, Netherlands, Australia, New Zealand
- Disasteradio (April–September 2009) – World Tour – US, England, Scotland, France, Germany, Luxembourg, Netherlands, Spain, Czech Republic, Poland, Slovakia, Slovenia, Belgium, Austria, Australia, New Zealand
- Die! Die! Die! (July 2010)
- Disasteradio (World Tour, 2011)
- Aa (2012)
- Mt. Eerie (2013)
- The Dan Deacon Ensemble (2013)
- Kirin J Callinan (2013)
- Alba (Nov 2013)
- Oscar Key Sung (Nov 2013)
- Donny Benet (Nov 2013)
- Shocking Pinks, Mongo Skato, Secret Knives, Sarah Mary Chadwick, Borrowed Cassettes (March 2015)
- Shocking Pinks (Sept–Dec 2015) – World Tour – China, France, Germany, UK, Netherlands, Switzerland, US, Australia, New Zealand
- My Disco (Auckland, Wellington – Feb 2016)
- Neil and Liam Finn "Where's My Room" (2018), 17 shows throughout New Zealand
- Drook Tour (2026)

== Camp A Low Hum ==
=== 2007 – Brookfields Outdoor Education Centre, Wainuiomata. 3–5 Feb ===
2007 Line-up:

- Actor/Model
- Bang! Bang! Aids!
- Batrider
- Birthglow
- The Bonnie Scarletts
- Captain Sergeant Major
- Collapsing Cities
- Coolies
- Cortina
- The Cosbys
- The Deadly Deaths
- Disasteradio (Lower Hutt)
- The Enright House
- Flick
- Frase+Bri
- Get Set Play
- Ghostplane
- Ginger Brown
- Girlfriend
- The Gladeyes
- Goldenaxe
- Grayson Gilmour
- Holidays With Friends
- The Inkling
- Kill Surf City
- Ladybird
- Lester Osborne a.k.a. Liam Finn
- Operation Rolling Thunder
- Over The Atlantic
- MC Stormtroopa
- Not So Experimental
- Phelps and Munro
- Pig Out
- Polka Dot Dot Dot
- Pumice
- The Rise and Demise
- Shaft
- The Shocking Pinks
- The Shrugs
- Signer
- The Situations
- The Sneaks
- So So Modern
- Thought Creature
- Tiger Tones
- Tommy Ill
- Vacants
- The Whipping Cats

=== 2008 – Tatum Park, Ohau. 2–5 Feb ===
2008 Official Line-up:

- Alphabethead (Wellington)
- Bang! Bang! Aids! (Melbourne)
- Bang! Bang! Eche! (Christchurch)
- Batrider (London/Aus)
- Big Flip The Massive (Napier)
- Black Market Art (Christchurch)
- Brand New Math (Auckland)
- The Brunettes (Auckland/New York)
- Boss Christ (Palmerston North)
- Cassette (Melbourne/Wellington)
- The Conjurors (Auckland)
- Connan and the Mockasins (London/NZ)
- The Cosbys (Auckland)
- Cosmic Rays of Death (Auckland)
- The Damned Evangelist (Lyttelton)
- Death in Gaza (Auckland)
- Desktop Icons (Auckland)
- Dick Dynamite and the Doppelgangers (Hamilton)
- Die! Die! Die! (Dunedin)
- Disasteradio (Lower Hutt/The Future)
- Disciples of Macca (Auckland)
- The Enright House (Christchurch)
- The Family Cactus (Wellington)
- Fighting The Shakes (Wellington)
- Frase+Bri (Christchurch)
- Hot Swiss Mistress (Wairarapa)
- Kittyhawke (Auckland)
- KOTAC (Dunedin)
- Ladybird (France)
- Lawrence Arabia (London/NZ)
- Liam Finn (Auckland)
- Little Pictures (Wellington)
- Los Hories (Auckland)
- Mean Street (Auckland)
- Oi! Boy (Auckland/UK)
- Onanon (Dunedin)
- The Phoenix Foundation (Wellington)
- Pikelet (Melbourne)
- Popolice (Melbourne)
- The Ragamuffin Children (Christchurch)
- Raised By Wolves (Wellington)
- The Reduction Agents (Auckland)
- The Ruby Suns (Auckland)
- Samuel Flynn Scott (Wellington)
- Seth & Merle (Wellington)
- Sets of 57 (Wanganui)
- Shaun K Anderson (Wellington)
- Sheba Williams (Wellington)
- Signer (Wellington)
- Smokin' Hot Bitch (Melbourne)
- Somethingorother (Melbourne)
- Sora Shima (Hamilton)
- Steve Abel & The Chrysalids (Auckland)
- The Tape Men (Wellington)
- Teen Wolf (Auckland)
- Thought Creature (Wellington)
- Tiger Tones (Christchurch)
- Tourettes (Auckland)
- Trans Am (US)

=== 2009 – Homedale, 6–8 February ===
2009 Official Line-up:

- Actor Slash Model (Melbourne)
- Aleks and the Ramps
- Alphabethead (Wellington)
- Bachelorette (Christchurch)
- Baseball (Melbourne)
- Bang! Bang! Eche! (Christchurch)
- Basketball Nightmare (Wellington)
- Big Flip The Massive (Napier)
- Bonaparte (Germany)
- The Broken Heartbreakers
- The Crayon Fields (Melbourne)
- Damsels (Hamilton)
- Darren Keen
- Darren Hanlon
- The DHDFDs
- Drumheller
- Disasteradio (Wellington)
- The E.L.F. (Sydney)
- East Brunswick All Girls Choir
- E J Barnes
- The Enright House
- The Family Cactus (Wellington)
- F in Math
- The Finn Family Band (Liam, Niel and Elroy Finn)
- Guy Blackman (Melbourne)
- Grayson Gilmour
- Justice Yeldham (Sydney)
- Love of Diagrams
- Mean Street (Auckland)
- Moron Says What! (Auckland)
- Mother and Father
- Mount Pleasant (Christchurch)
- Mr Hayday (Auckland)
- My Disco (Melbourne)
- Ned Collette (Melbourne)
- Over The Atlantic (Wellington)
- Ouch My Face (Melbourne)
- Paint Your Golden Face
- Pikelet (Melbourne)
- Pop Hits City (Christchurch)
- Rand & Holland (Sydney)
- Ria Grun
- Rifles (Wellington)
- The Ruby Suns
- Sickboy (Belgium)
- The Show is the Rainbow a.k.a. Darren Keen (Nebraska)
- Sets
- Sharpie Crows
- Sly Hats
- The Sorry Entertainers (Germany)
- So So Modern (Wellington)
- The Sneaks
- The Stabs
- Stefanimal (Dunedin)
- Sven Dohse (Germany)
- Teacups (Auckland)
- TFF (Dunedin)
- The Twerps
- Thought Creature
- Toecutter (Sydney)
- Tom Watts (Wanganui)
- The Undercurrents
- Wilburforces (Auckland)
- The Wicks

2009 Renegade Room Line-up:

- brains
- Boyfriend
- New Friend
- Gearloose
- God Bows to Math
- Thugquota
- Joe Blossom
- The Enright House (Christchurch)
- Tono
- FAUX (now XUAF) (London)
- Doteyes
- Rillian Hounds
- Ice Cream Soldiers
- Kittentank
- Andy Gibson
- Bond Street Bridge
- Silver Scrolls
- Black Market Art
- Snowfield
- Golden Axe

=== 2012 – Homedale ===
2012 Official Line-Up:

- Megalex
- Emily Edrosa
- Rites Wild
- Shenandoah Davis
- Wintercoats
- Spring Break
- No Art
- Lost Rockets
- Kikuyu
- Forest Spirits
- Kitchen's Floor
- Alps
- Opposite Sex
- T54
- Glass Vaults
- Bare Grillz
- Sexy Merlin
- Ouch My Face
- Terrible Truths
- Quarks
- Assassins 88
- So So Modern
- Golden Axe
- Dead
- Toecutter
- Aa
- Mueran Humanos
- Rackets
- Guerre
- Tender Moonlight
- Moppy
- Castlecliff Lights
- Brian Borcherdt
- Joe Blossom
- Terror of the Deep
- Gutter Parties
- $noregazZzm
- Dance Asthmatics
- Terrible Truths
- Jon Lemmon
- Absolute Boys
- Hallowe'en
- Usurper of Modern Medicine
- The Shocking and Stunning
- Las Tetas
- Megastick Fanfare
- Cool Cult
- Kirin J. Callinan
- The Phoenix Foundation
- Forces
- All Seeing Hand
- Beastwars
- Hawnay Troof
- Poor You Poor Me
- Mark McGuire
- Suren Unka
- Watercolours
- Boxcar Rattle
- Cartoon
- Sleepy Age
- Gutter Parties
- Galapagoose
- Razorwyre
- Orchestra of Spheres
- Numbskull
- Candie Hank
- Prince Rama
- Bewm Babies
- No Art
- BAADDD
- The Dan Deacon Ensemble
- Publicist
- All Seeing Hand
- Thought Creature

2012 Renegade Room Line-Up:

- Austin Boyle
- Project H
- YMAAGTEC
- Toy Ghost
- Bow Arrow
- Cecil & Hercules
- Diving
- Dicktime
- Android Sex Factory
- Sunken Seas
- A Art
- Crackhouse 5
- Tiger Choir
- Major Major
- Foxtrot
- No Way Sweden
- Disco Fap
- Lontalius
- Sherpa
- Wires
- Hands That Break Hands
- Headsong
- Pizza Andre
- Ralph
- P.P. Flo
- Black City Lights
- Disasteradio
- Snowwaves
- ScotDrakula
- Jetsam Isles
- Scarlett Lashes
- Kevin CK Lo
- Monoceros
- Secretive George
- Fauxhound
- Fantastic Sailors
- Carb on Carb
- Totems
- Tommy Ill

=== 2013 – Homedale, Wainuiomata, 8–10 February ===
2013 Official Line-Up

- Sarah Mary Chadwick
- Foxtrot
- Athuzela Brown
- Eyeliner
- Superstar
- Adam Page
- Alba
- Lightening
- Cool Rainbows
- ScotDrakula
- Proton Beast
- Space Ventura
- Caroles
- Summer Flake
- Lenin Lennon
- Riki Gooch
- The Body Lyre
- Making
- Sweater
- Pines
- Tommy Ill
- Mesa Cosa
- Rackets
- Duck Duck Chop
- Secret Knives
- Suren Unka
- Mere Women
- PCP Eagles
- All Seeing Hand
- Audio Tears
- Pictureplane
- Scattered Brains of the Lovely Union
- Huf
- Seth Frightening
- Tiny Ruins
- Strange Harvest
- Name UL
- Black City Lights
- Beach Pigs
- Pines
- Sleep ∞ Over
- Totems
- School Girl Report
- Anthonie Tonnon
- Salad Boys
- No Aloha
- A Dead Forest Index
- Zen Mantra
- Parents
- Naked
- Mt Eerie
- Scraps
- Lenin Lennon
- Per Purpose
- Mean Girls
- The Mob
- Leno Lovecraft
- Summer Flake
- Thee Oh Sees
- Sunken Seas
- Sal Valentine & the Babyshakes
- Roland Tings
- West Coast Bullies
- Oscar Key Sung
- Estère
- Grayson Gilmour
- Electric Fence
- The Dobermen
- Oscar + Martin
- Carb on Carb
- Psychic Maps
- Snapper
- Shacklock Meth Party
- Die! Die! Die!
- Szo Szo Modern
- Dance Asthmatics
- Mongo Skato

2013 Renegade Line-Up

- Cecil & Hercules
- Dick Astley
- Dicktime
- BnP
- boy wonderrr
- Ham Sufferer
- Disco Fap
- No Way Sweden
- Hate Box Acid
- Nue Bliss
- Minderbender
- Harris
- Project H
- Sloth Leather Fetish
- Tanydd
- Team Ugly
- Laurier
- Old Mate
- Opie Will Break Your Heart
- Lorendz
- Team Ugly
- Keith! Party
- Ljl Zmxvnxxg
- Ralph
- Rebecca Melrose
- No Saliva
- Mischancerie
- Rupert!
- Scarlett Lashes
- Wires
- Weave Busters Presents!
- X-Ray Charles

=== 2014 – Homedale, Wainuiomata ===
2014 Official Line-up:

- All Seeing Hand
- Alphabethead
- Arcology
- Astronalautis
- Athuzela Brown
- Bad Sav
- Bare Grillz
- Beastwars
- Bespin
- Black Vanilla
- Blood Bags
- Bone
- Brilliant Swords
- Career Girls
- Cassius Select
- Circle Jerk (Liam Finn, James Milne, Sam Scott)
- Circular Keys
- Clowns
- Collarbones
- Daedelus
- Day Ravies
- Death and the Maiden
- Disasteradio
- DJ Douggpound
- Dope Body
- Doprah
- Fly Nights
- Gains
- Glass Vaults
- Golden Awesome
- Golden Axe
- GPOGP
- Grayson Gilmour
- Guerre
- Heart Beach
- Holy Ghost Party
- I.e crazy
- INDI
- John the Baptist
- Kangaroo Skull
- Kirin J Callinan
- Las Tetas
- Lawrence Arabia
- Liam Finn
- Log Horn Breed
- Lontalius
- Making
- Mangelwurzel
- Mermaidens
- Mesa Cosa
- Microsoft Voices
- Mongo Skato
- Monster Onsomb
- Nadia Reid
- No Art
- Orchestra of Spheres
- Perfect Hair Forever
- Popolice
- Race Banyon
- Rackets
- Rainbow Chan
- Seagull
- Seth Frightening
- Sheep, Dog & Wolf
- Shenandoah Davis
- Shocking and Stunning
- Shovels
- Skymning
- Society
- Sole
- Spermaids
- Street Chant
- Surf City
- Swimming
- Tanned Christ
- Team Cat Food
- Team Ugly
- The Clean
- The Shocking Pinks
- Tiny Ruins
- Trick Mammoth
- Trust Punks
- Viking Weed
- Gudrun Gut
- Gary War
- Jon Lemmon

== Campus A Low Hum ==
=== 2010 – Flock House, 23–25 Jan' ===
2010 Official Lineup:

- A Dead Forest Index
- Bandicoot
- Batrider
- Bum Creek
- Connan Mockasin
- Cut Off Your Hands
- Daedelus
- Dan Deacon
- Dear Times Waste
- Deer Park
- Denim Owl
- Dent May
- DHDFDs
- Diana Rozz
- Die Die Die
- The Dodos
- DZ
- EBGC
- An Emerald City
- F in Math
- Flying Scribble
- Frase
- Gaywyre (Razorwyre)
- God Bows to Math
- Golden Axe
- Jens Lekman
- John the Baptist
- Koko Nuts
- Love Connection
- Lucky Paul
- Mild America
- Monster Mash
- Nevernudes
- Newtown Street Justice
- Orchestra of Spheres
- Old Grey Wolf
- Oloverly
- Ouch My Face
- Parking Lot Experiments
- Pets with Pets
- Polka Dot Dot Dot
- Popstrangers
- Potential Falcon
- Richard Paul Alexander (Glass Vaults)
- Rifles
- Ruby Suns
- Secret Knives
- Seth Frightening
- Shiver Like Timber
- Shocking Pinks
- Siamese
- Signer
- Surf City
- The Zits
- Thugquota
- Tiger Tones
- Toecutter
- The Show is the Rainbow
- Witch Hats
- So So Modern
- Siamese

=== 2011 Flock House, 11–13 Feb ===
2011 Official Lineup:

- MUSICIANS: Ten Thousand Free Men & Their Families
- Alphabethead
- Bachelorette
- Baptism of Uzi
- Beastwars
- Butcher Blades
- Captain Ahab
- Caribou
- Coasting
- Coolies
- CTRIX
- Dear Time's Waste
- Delaney Davidson
- Disasteradio
- Drab Doo-Riffs
- Four Tet
- Freddy Fudd Pucker
- Ghost Wave
- Glass Vaults
- The Golden Awesome
- Grayson Gilmour and Band
- Great Earthquake
- Gucci Goo
- Heart Attack Alley
- High Places
- History of Snakes
- Hold Dear
- James Duncan and Chelsea Jade
- Kitsunegari
- Lawrence Arabia
- Leno Lovecraft
- Liam Finn
- Lowtide
- Mothers of Darkness
- My Disco
- NO ZU
- The Nudge
- Old Loaves
- Orchestra of Spheres
- Paper Ghost
- Parking Lot Experiments
- Pikachunes
- Pond
- Rat vs Possum
- Royal Headache
- Sam Hamilton
- Scul Hazzards
- Secret Knives
- Sharpie Crows
- Siamese
- Spring Break
- St. Rupertsberg
- Street
- Chant
- Surf Friends
- The Tantrums
- Teen Hygiene
- TFF
- The Ocean Floor
- The Trons
- Thundercub
- Tiger Choir
- Toro Y Moi
- Transcription of Organ Music
- Trjaeu
- Useless Children
- Wet Wings
- Wilberforces
- ARTISTS: Sarah Jane Parton
- Adam Alexander
- Ann Shelton
- Brydee Rood
- Caroline Johnston
- Claire Harris
- Daniel du Bern
- David Cross
- Erica Sklenars and Daniel Beban, et al.
- Gemma Syme
- Golden Axe
- Lia Kent Mackillop
- Matthew Gleeson
- Mike Heynes
- Murray Hewitt
- Raewyn Martin
- Ricky Allman
- Ronnie Van Hout
- Rebecca Kereopa
- Chris Connolly
- Benjamin Buchanan
- Liz Allan

== Square Wave Festival ==
A nationwide electronic city music festival. 35 shows took place in Auckland, Palmerston North, Wellington, Christchurch and Dunedin during November 2013.

2013 Official Line-up

- Alba (AU)
- Alphabethead
- Audio Tears
- Black City Lights
- Black Yoghurt
- Blaze The Emperor
- Box Banter
- Boycrush
- Career Girls
- Commander Dimes
- Container (US)
- Disasteradio
- Donny Benet (AU)
- Doprah
- Encompass
- Ernesto Anemone
- Estere
- Fly Nights
- Foxtrot
- Gamer
- Gasp
- Given Names
- Glass Vaults
- Golden Axe
- Grayson Gilmour
- Happy Kidz
- Heatsick (DE)
- Jet Jaguar
- Jon Lemmon
- Kamandi
- Kariiiba
- Laurier
- Lavender
- Leno Lovecraft
- Major Napier (AU)
- Mongo Skato
- Moppy
- Murderbike
- Name UL
- Neon Leon
- Oscar Key Sung (AU)
- Pikachunes
- Race Banyon
- Randa
- Riki Gooch
- Roc///Opt/
- Roland Tings (AU)
- Sam Hamilton
- Sheep Dog & Wolf
- Skymning
- $NoregazZzm
- Suren Unka
- Team Cat Food
- The Shocking And Stunning
- Tommy Ill
- Totems
- Tourettes
- Vitamins
- Wayas
- West Coast Bullies
- Yvnalesca
- Zachariah Bell
- Zen Mantra

== A Low Hum NYE Parties ==
=== ALH NYE at Bodega, 31 Dec 2006 ===
- So So Modern
- Disasteradio
- Kill Surf City
- Super Force
- Over the Atlantic
- Tommy Ill
- Vorn
- DJ G Fab Roadkill
- Lets get Incredible Soundsystem

=== ALH NYE at Bodega, 31 Dec 2007 ===
- Connan and the Mockasins
- Collapsing Cities
- KittyHawk
- Little Pictures
- Holiday with Friends
- Tommy Ill

=== Fields of Dreams at Camp Wainui, 31 Dec 2009 & 1 Jan 2010 ===
- Seth Frightening
- Diana Rozz
- So So Modern
- Disasteradio
- Old Grey Wolf
- Richard Paul Alexander (Glass Vaults)
- Wet Wings
- John the Baptist
- Full Moon Fiasco

=== Big City Dreams, Garden Club, 31 Dec 2010 ===
- Disasteradio
- Bang Bang Eche
- Thought Creature
- Red Steers
- Signer
- Leno Lovecraft
- Fistful of Gems
- Pikachunes
- Tommy Ill
- Monster Mash
- Siamese
- 47 Diamantes
- Forest Spirits
- Brains
- Old Grey Wolf
- Gucci Goo
- Sleepy Age
- Surf Friends
- Little Bark
- Rose Young
- Bono
- DJ Lotion
- DJ Bernard Galactica
- DJ Leno Lovecraft

=== Puppies NYE, 31 Dec 2013 ===
- Disasteradio
- Golden Axe
- Mongo Skato
- Race Banyon
- Arcology
- Waterfalls
- Roc///Opt//
- Wayas
- DJ Jesus HTML Christ

=== A Low Hum House at Erua Lodge, 31 Dec 2014 & 1 Jan 2015 ===
Official Lineup 31 Dec

- Sheep Dog & Wolf
- Gains
- Totems
- Rackets
- Race Banyon
- Mermaidens
- Tommy Ill

Official Lineup 1 Jan

- Finn Johansson
- Secret Knives (Solo)
- Lontalius
- Glass Vaults
- Shocking Pinks
- Yvnalesca
- Traps PS
- Career Girls
- Trust Punks
- Jon Lemmon

=== ALHxNYExSEA at Boat Cafe, 31 Dec 2015 ===
Official Line-up

- Mongo Skato
- k2k
- Powernap
- Golden Axe
- Groeni
- Leno Lovecraft (DJ set)
- Fly Nights
- Introverted Dancefloor
- Yvnalesca
- Jon Lemmon (played on the beach outside)
- Ruby Suns (soundsystem)

=== 15 Years of A Low Hum at Tatum Park, 30 & 31 Dec 2016 ===
Official Line-up

- Disasteradio
- All Seeing Hand
- So So Modern
- Orchestra of Spheres
- Shayne Carter and band
- Die Die Die
- Las Tetas
- Mermaidens
- Astro Children
- Niisa
- Log Horn Breed
- UMU
- Coolies
- Nadia Reid
- Tiny Ruins
- KVKA
- Secret Knives
- Groeni
- Jon Lemmon
- Purple Pilgrims
- Career Girls
- Totems
- k2k
- Mongo Skato
- Alphabethead
- Pumice
- Race Banyon
- J9R
- Keepsakes
- Duckling Monster
- Pikelet
- Peach Milk
- Miss June
- Carb on Carb
- Hex
- So Laid Back Country China
- Kane Strang
- Unsanitary Napkin
- DJ Oboe
- Caroles
- How Get
- Juiceroof
- Master Blaster
- Cephalopod
- Waterfalls
- Prizegiving
- Kolya
- Greenfog
- Cutss
- Lil Stiffy
- Alexa Casino
- Mr Amish
- Introverted Dancefloor
- Powernap
- Earth Tongue
- Guardian Singles
- Moppy
- Kush Boogie
- Aw B (DJ set)
- Skymning (DJ set)
- Norma (DJ set)
- Prom Queen (DJ Set)

== A Low Hum Releases ==
- HUM001 – Ejector, The Lower You Go EP
- HUM002 – Ghostplane, EP
- HUM003 – Volume: Wellington Turns Down
- HUM004 – A LOW HUM Issue 8, CD1
- HUM005 – A LOW HUM Issue 9, CD2
- HUM006 – A LOW HUM Issue 10, CD3
- HUM007 – A LOW HUM Issue 11, CD4
- HUM008 – A LOW HUM Issue 12, CD5
- HUM009 – A LOW HUM Issue 13, CD6
- HUM010 – A LOW HUM Issue 14, CD7
- HUM011 – A LOW HUM Issue 15, DVD1
- HUM012 – A LOW HUM Issue 16, CD8
- HUM013 – A LOW HUM DVD2
- HUM014 – ALH Series 3, Issue 1 CD1 + Xanadu "Live, demos and studio recordings"
- HUM015 – ALH Series 3, Issue 2 CD2 + Dead Pan Rangers "A selection of songs"
- HUM016 – ALH Series 3, Issue 3 CD3 + Dana Eclair/Ghostplane "National Velvet"
- HUM017 – ALH Series 3, Issue 4 CD4 + Disasteradio "Synthtease"
- HUM018 – ALH Series 3, Issue 5 CD5 + Urban Tramper "Best of, So Far..."
- HUM019 – ALH Series 3, Issue 6 CD6 + Looma III
- HUM020 – ALH Series 3, Issue 7 CD7 + Ejector "Two Thousand and Seven"
- HUM021 – ALH Series 3, Issue 8 CD8 + Enright House "Broken Hands EP"
- HUM022 – ALH Series 3, Issue 9 CD9 + Dark Beaks "Spill Your Heart"
- HUM023 – A Low Hum DVD3
- HUM024-030 – A LOW HUM Singles Club Series 1
- HUM031 – The Enright House – A Maze and Amazement, September 2007
- HUM032 – Disasteradio – Visions, October 2007
- HUM033 – Secret Knives – The Wolves EP, February 2008 (Digital Release only)
- HUM034 – Mount Pleasant – Mount Pleasant EP, September 2008 (Digital Release only)
- HUM035 – Red Steers – Lagaluga Lagoon EP, September 2008 (Digital Release only)
- HUM036 – Over the Atlantic – Dimensions, 17 November 2008
- HUM037 – A Low Hum 2009 Digital Sampler, 6 February 2009 (Digital Release Only)
- HUM038 – Signer – Next we Bring You the Fire, 23 November 2009
- HUM039 – Red Steers – The Fever Fold, 26 April 2010 (Digital Release with Artwork)
- HUM040 – Secret Knives – Affection, 1 October 2010 (Digital Release)
- HUM041 – Disasteradio – Charisma, 15 October 2010 (Digital Release)
- HUM042 – Leno Lovecraft – EP #1 (Digital Release)
- HUM043 – Disasteradio – Charisma (CD)
- HUM044 – Disasteradio – Charisma (LP)
- HUM045 – CAMP A LOW HUM – 2012 Collection (Cassette)
- HUM046 – CAMP A LOW HUM – 2012 Collection (Digital)
- HUM047 – Square Wave Festival – Volume 1 (Digital)
- HUM048 – Square Wave Festival – Volume 2 (Digital)
- HUM049 – Square Wave Festival – Volume 3 (Digital)
- HUM050 – The End of Puppies – 2xLP
- HUM051 – Shocking Pinks – Dance the Dance Electric – LP
- HUM052 – Shocking Pinks – Dance the Dance Electric – CD
- HUM053 – Shocking Pinks – Dance the Dance Electric – Cassette
- HUM054 – Shocking Pinks – Dance the Dance Electric – Digital
- HUM055 – 'Translation' – Various Artists (12" Peter King Acetate)
- HUM056 – 'Wake Up Children' – Various Artists (Cassette) *Split release with 'Crash Symbols'
- HUM057 – Eyeliner – Buy Now
- HUM059 – Drook – Aotearoa
