= Nein (disambiguation) =

Nein is a village in Israel.

Nein may also refer to:

- The Nein, an American indie rock band
  - The Nein EP, their 2004 recording
- Nein, the Japanese band Sound Horizon's 8th major album
- "Nein" (song), a song by King Gizzard & the Lizard Wizard
- Nein, the German word for "no"

== Persons with the surname ==
- Henry Nein (1860-1933), an American politician
- Jo Nein, pseudonym used by Norwegian writer Nini Roll Anker (1873–1942)
- Scott Nein (in office 1991-2004), an American politician
- Timothy Nein (in action in 2005), a United States soldier, recipient of Distinguished Service Cross
