= Payola (Desaparecidos album) =

Studio album by Desaparecidos
- Released: June 23, 2015
- Genres: Punk rock, post-hardcore
- Length: 40:27
- Label: Epitaph
- Producers: Mike Mogis, Desaparecidos

Desaparecidos chronology
Read Music/Speak Spanish (2002)	Payola (2015)

Payola is the second studio album by the American rock band Desaparecidos, released on June 23, 2015, through Epitaph Records.

== Background and recording ==
While Read Music/Speak Spanish, the band's first album, focused on themes relating to socioeconomics, marriage, and the American workforce, Payola consciously tackles a wider range of political issues. Payola is a cohesive body of raw, loud, and angry songs about endemic injustice, racial profiling, the mistreatment of immigrants, corporate greed, and domestic spying.

The band reunited in 2010 to play a Concert For Equality in its hometown of Omaha—an event organized by lead singer Conor Oberst to promote the repeal of then-recently enacted measures to prohibit businesses and landlords from hiring or renting to undocumented immigrants in Fremont, Nebraska. According to Dalley, the band had struggled to schedule recording sessions, but the Concert For Equality "was the best show we'd ever played," which "really encouraged us to play together" once again. In 2012, the band worked with Mike Mogis to record some singles.

Payola was recorded over multiple sessions in 2014.

== Reception ==
Professional ratings
Aggregate scores
Source	Rating
Metacritic	76/100
Review scores
Source	Rating
Absolute Punk	8.5/10
AllMusic	4.0/5 stars
The A.V. Club	B
Consequence of Sound	B+
The Guardian	3/5 stars
Mojo	4.0/5 stars
Paste	8.8/10
Pitchfork	7.6/10
PopMatters	7/10 stars
Vice (Expert Witness)	A−

Payola reached the number 160 position of the Billboard 200 on July 11, 2015.

== Track listing ==
No.	Title	Length
1.	"The Left Is Right"	2:25
2.	"The Underground Man"	2:24
3.	"City on the Hill"	3:09
4.	"Golden Parachutes"	2:03
5.	"Radicalized"	2:49
6.	"MariKKKopa"	2:46
7.	"Te Amo Camila Vallejo"	3:38
8.	"Ralphy's Cut"	3:22
9.	"Backsell"	3:13
10.	"Slacktivist"	2:54
11.	"Search the Searches"	2:31
12.	"10 Steps Behind"	2:58
13.	"Von Maur Massacre"	2:26
14.	"Anonymous"	3:44
Total length:		40:27

== Personnel ==
- Conor Oberst: vocals, guitar
- Denver Dalley: guitar
- Ian McElroy: keyboards
- Landon Hedges: bass, vocals
- Matt Baum: drums

Cameos on the album include Tim Kasher of Cursive (on "City on the Hill"), Laura Jane Grace of Against Me! (on "Golden Parachutes"), and the So So Glos (on "Slacktivist"). Tracks including "MariKKKopa", "Backsell", "Anonymous", "The Left Is Right", "Te Amo Camila Vallejo", and "The Underground Man" were previously released as singles.
