= Wrath of Circuits =

Studio album by The Nein
- Released: May 17, 2005
- Recorded: at Pontchartrain in Chapel Hill NC, August through December 2004
- Genre: Indie rock, post-punk, art rock
- Length: 38:29
- Label: Sonic Unyon

The Nein chronology
Wrath of Circuits	Luxury

Professional ratings
Review scores
Source	Rating
Allmusic	4/5 stars
Pitchfork Media	5.1/10 stars
Pop Matters	7/10 stars

Wrath of Circuits is the full-length debut by The Nein, release in 2005. Whereas their earlier eponymous EP The Nein had a primarily dance-punk sensibility, Wrath of Circuits delves into more experimental territory with more complex and oblique songwriting and addition of electronic noise artist Dale Flattum. Critical reception to the album has been somewhat warm, though appreciation for the band's experimentation has been tempered by concerns about lack of accessibility.

== Track listing ==
All songs written and composed by The Nein.

1. "Faint Sounds" – 4:10
2. "Foreign Friendster" – 4:17
3. "Courtesy Bows to New Wave" – 2:10
4. "The Vibe" – 4:17
5. "Conjugated Reverb" – 3:01
6. "Heatseeker" – 3:16
7. "Crawl Grow Red Slow" – 3:23
8. "Jim Morrison in Desert" – 5:12
9. "Wrath of Circuits" – 4:28
10. "Bleeding Elvis" – 4:15

== Personnel ==
The Nein

- Finn Cohen – Vocals, guitar
- Casey Burns – bass
- Robert Biggers – drum, keyboards
- Dale Flattum – Loops, sampling, tapes

Guest musicians

- Bob "Crowmeat" Pence – Horn, wind, saxophone
- Carrie Shull – Horn, English horn, oboe, wind
- Amy Wilkinson – Clarinet, horn, wind

Production

- Jayce Murphy – Engineering, mixing
- Noah Mintz – Mastering
- Finn Cohen – Programming
- Casey Burns – Cutting, graphic design
- Tooth – Artwork
