= 89 Cubs =

89 Cubs may refer to:

- 1989 Chicago Cubs season – the 1989 baseball season of the Chicago Cubs
- The '89 Cubs – a musical group from Omaha, Nebraska
