= Transitionalisms EP =

Transitionalisms

EP by The Nein
- Released: September 19, 2006
- Recorded: 2006
- Genre: Indie pop, post-punk, art rock
- Length: 16:54
- Label: Sonic Unyon

The Nein EPs chronology
The Nein (2004)	Transitionalisms (2006)

Transitionalisms is the six-song EP by The Nein, released through Sonic Unyon Records in 2006.

== Track listing ==
All songs written and composed by The Nein, except where noted.

1. "Butcher's Tale" (The Zombies) – 3:31
2. "Transitionalisthmus" – 0:38
3. "Hospital Television" – 4:39
4. "Sexy Beast" – 3:15
5. "The Vibe (Crash's Bleeder Remix)" – 2:43
6. "Convalescent Homes" – 2:18

== Personnel ==
The Nein

- Finn Cohen – Vocals, guitar
- Casey Burns – bass
- Robert Biggers – drum, keyboards
- Dale Flattum – ???
- Josh Carpenter – ???

Production

- Nick Peterson – Engineering, mixing
- Jayce Murphy – Engineering
- Crash – Remixing
- Finn Cohen – Programming
- Casey Burns – graphic design
