= Read Music/Speak Spanish =

Studio album by Desaparecidos
- Released: February 12, 2002
- Genres: Punk rock, indie rock, emo
- Length: 31:32 (U.S. Version) 35:11 (International Version)
- Label: Saddle Creek

Desaparecidos chronology
Read Music/Speak Spanish (2002)	Payola (2015)

Professional ratings
Review scores
Source	Rating
AllMusic	4/5 stars
Pitchfork	(4.6/10)
Rolling Stone	3/5 stars
Spin	9/10
Tiny Mix Tapes	3.5/5 marks

Read Music/Speak Spanish is the first studio album by American punk band Desaparecidos. Released in February 2002, the record is the forty-second release of Saddle Creek Records. Reviews were mostly positive upon release.

== About ==
Read Music/Speak Spanish is a punk/indie-rock concept album loosely centered on perceived American materialism and greed. Song topics include the pressures of upward mobility on marriage, the suburban expansion of Omaha, the desire to always follow the latest fashion or fad, the effect of consumerism on developing countries, and the mixture of religion and politics.

The album was recorded in one week, the same week of the September 11 attacks. Since the concept of the album is a criticism of American consumerism, the band considered not releasing it and partly due to this timing the album failed commercially. Despite its lack of commercial success, the album gained an extensive cult following.

== Track listing ==
No.	Title	Length
1.	"Man and Wife, The Former (Financial Planning)"	3:16
2.	"Mañana"	3:24
3.	"Greater Omaha"	4:14
4.	"Man and Wife, The Latter (Damaged Goods)"	3:39
5.	"Mall of America"	2:41
6.	"The Happiest Place on Earth"	3:02
7.	"Survival of the Fittest/It's a Jungle Out There"	2:56
8.	"$$$$"	5:10
9.	"Hole in One"	3:08
Total length:		31:35

=== International version ===
No.	Title	Length
1.	"What's New for Fall"	3:46
2.	"Man and Wife, The Former (Financial Planning)"	3:16
3.	"Mañana"	3:24
4.	"Greater Omaha"	4:14
5.	"Man and Wife, The Latter (Damaged Goods)"	3:39
6.	"Mall of America"	2:41
7.	"The Happiest Place on Earth"	3:02
8.	"Survival of the Fittest/It's a Jungle Out There"	2:56
9.	"$$$$"	5:10
10.	"Hole in One"	3:08
Total length:		35:21

== Personnel ==
- Conor Oberst - vocals, guitar
- Denver Dalley - guitar
- Ian McElroy - keyboards
- Landon Hedges - bass, vocals
- Matt Baum - drums
