= There Are Giants in the Earth =

Studio album by The '89 Cubs
- Released: October 26, 2004
- Recorded: Artery Recording Studio (Omaha, NE); Jane Parks Grey Memorial Library (Davidson, NC); Presto! Recording Studios (Lincoln, NE); Steve Pedersen's house(Omaha, NE); Adjacent Magic (Omaha, NE)
- Genre: Indie rock
- Length: 42:33
- Label: Slowdance Records

Professional ratings
Review scores
Source	Rating
Allmusic	link
Pitchfork Media	7.3/10 14 Jan 05

There Are Giants in the Earth is the only album recorded by The '89 Cubs, a band from Omaha, Nebraska. It was released October 26, 2004 on Slowdance Records.

== Track listing ==
1. Candid Flames - 5:37
2. Oh, The Things We Put in Our Heads - 3:36
3. Sorry Tornado - 6:14
4. How to Prepare for Death - 3:07
5. Code of Conduct: Ghosts - 6:56
6. We Won the Party - 1:58
7. Unpopular Meals - 2:54
8. Treason Parade Hat- Wearers - 0:59
9. Birthday Bloodline - 4:34
10. Burn the Boats - 1:31
