= The White Octave =

American rock band

The White Octave was a rock band from Chapel Hill, North Carolina. The group was founded shortly after Steve Pedersen left Cursive, and was initially a trio with Lincoln Hancock and Robert Biggers before Finn Cohen was added on guitar. They released two full-length albums and appeared on several compilations before finally breaking up. The founding member, Steve Pedersen (formerly of Slowdown Virginia/Cursive), went back to his hometown of Omaha, Nebraska to form the band Criteria. Robert Biggers and Finn Cohen went on to form The Nein. The group reunited to play in North Carolina in 2014.

== Band members ==
- Steve Pedersen - vocals, guitar
- Lincoln Hancock - bass, vocals
- Robert Biggers - drums
- Finn Cohen - guitar

== Discography ==
=== Albums ===
- Style No. 6312 - (2000 · Deep Elm Records; 2014 · Broken Circle)
- Menergy - (2001 · Initial Records)

=== Singles ===
- Weight / Ebb And Flow (2001 - Moment Before Impact Records)

=== Splits ===
- Sorry About Dresden/The White Octave (2000 · Tritone Records)

=== Compilations ===
- The Emo Diaries No. 5: I Guess This Is Goodbye (2000 · Deep Elm Records)
- Deep Elm Records Sampler 3: Sound Spirit Fury Fire (2001)
- Deep Elm Records: Unreleased No. 2 (2002)
- Emo is Awesome/Emo is Evil (2002 · Deep Elm Records)
- Kampai (Bifocal Media · 2002)
- Patchwork (2002)
- Too Young To Die: Preventing Youth Suicide (2003 · Deep Elm Records)
