= Sunken Seas =

New Zealand shoegaze band

- Origin: Wellington, New Zealand
- Genres: Shoegaze, Post-rock
- Years active: 2011–present
- Labels: Muzai Records, Tenzenmen
- Members: Ryan Harte; Luke Kavanagh; David Provan; Jordan Puryer
- Past members: Craig Rattray (Drums); Samuel Lovrich-Fitzpatrick (Drums); Jack Hooker (Bass)
- Website: Official website

Sunken Seas are a four piece Shoegaze rock band from Auckland, New Zealand, formed in late 2011 previously signed to Muzai Records.

Their debut album Null Hour was released to positive reviews in June 2012 via Muzai Records in New Zealand and Internationally via Australian label Tenzenmen.

The album was nominated for the 2013 Taite Music Prize.

Following two Australian International tours in 2013 and festival appearances at the Chronophonium Festival and Camp A Low Hum the band recorded an EP ‘Cataclysm’ with New Zealand recording engineer Nick Roughan of The Skeptics in July 2013 and released the debut single from the EP shortly afterwards to favourable reviews most notably from Everett True

A short film entitled 'Cataclysm' concerning Existentialism was produced and released by the band on the release of the EP.

Sunken Seas have toured with The Black Angels, Wooden Shjips, Bailterspace & John Cooper Clarke.

In August 2015 the band announced they were to self-release a second album entitled Glass to be released in September 2015, and would be touring New Zealand. The album made the New Zealand Top 20 charts, garnered favorable reviews, and was nominated for the 2016 Taite Music Prize.

== Discography ==
=== Albums ===
Year	Title	Details	Peak chart positions
Year	Title	Details	NZ
2015	Glass	Released: 25 September 2015; Formats: Digital download; Label: Self-Released	12
"—" denotes releases that did not chart or were not released in that country.

Year	Title	Details	Peak chart positions
Year	Title	Details	NZ
2012	Null Hour	Released: 28 June 2012; Formats: CD/Digital download; Label: Muzai Records	-
"—" denotes releases that did not chart or were not released in that country.

=== EPs ===
Year	Title	Details	Peak chart positions
Year	Title	Details	NZ
2013	Catalclysm	Released: 6 September 2013; Formats: Digital download; Label: Muzai Records	—
"—" denotes releases that did not chart or were not released in that country.

=== Music videos ===
Year	Music video	Director(s)
2011	"High Rise"	Sunken Seas
2012	"Paid Your Price"	Sunken Seas
2014	"Cataclysm"	Ryan Harte and Alexander Hoyles
2015	"Clear"	Sunken Seas
2015	"Mirage"	Jac Wilson

== Awards and nominations ==
Year	Organisation	Nominated work	Award	Result
2013	Independent Music New Zealand	Null Hour	Taite Music Prize	Nominated
2016	Independent Music New Zealand	Glass	Taite Music Prize	Nominated
