= Shaky Molars =

American indie pop band

- Origin: Denver, Colorado, United States
- Genres: Pop, indie pop
- Years active: 2011–2012
- Label: Self-released
- Members: Chuck Potashner; Nate Adelmann; Ryan Mulligan; Kat Roscoe; Kayla Martin
- Website: www.shakymolars.com

Shaky Molars is a pop group based in Denver, Colorado. The line-up consists of Chuck Potashner (vocals/guitar/songwriting), Nate Adelmann (lead guitar), Kat Roscoe (bass), Ryan Mulligan (drums) and Kayla Martin (cello). Potashner and Roscoe are former members of Denver twee pop group teamAWESOME!.

Shaky Molars have been described as "wild, flirty pop," and a November 2011 show opening for Mates of State was described by critics as "an indie-rock opera about Denver hipsters in love." Potashner’s lyrics show a common theme of love for Denver, Colorado; Potashner has said in interviews that his return to the city after years in San Diego, California was the missing ingredient to Shaky Molars’ success.

November 1, 2011 saw the release of the group's first single, “Daniele Marie Miller,” after which Shaky Molars announced they were in-studio for an album to be released in Spring 2012.

Notable acts Shaky Molars has played with include Mates of State, Jens Lekman, Wavves, The Blow, Grouplove, David Dondero, and The Show is the Rainbow.

== Members ==
- Chuck Potashner (songwriting, guitar, vocals)
- Nate Adelmann (guitar)
- Kat Roscoe (bass, vocals)
- Ryan Mulligan (drums)
- Kayla Martin (cello, vocals)

Contributors to Shaky Molars:

- Meghan Hainer (violin, vocals)
- Lora Bird (bassoon, vocals)
- Carrie Beeder (cello)
- Jonathan Warder (album artwork)

== Discography ==
=== Albums ===
- Bayaud Ave (BandCamp; mp3; 2012)

=== Singles ===
- Daniele Marie Miller (BandCamp; mp3; 2011)

=== Compilation appearances ===
- TitMouse 3 (TitMouse Magazine; CD; 2011) – contains "Daniele Marie Miller"
