= Limited Express (Has Gone?) =

Japanese band

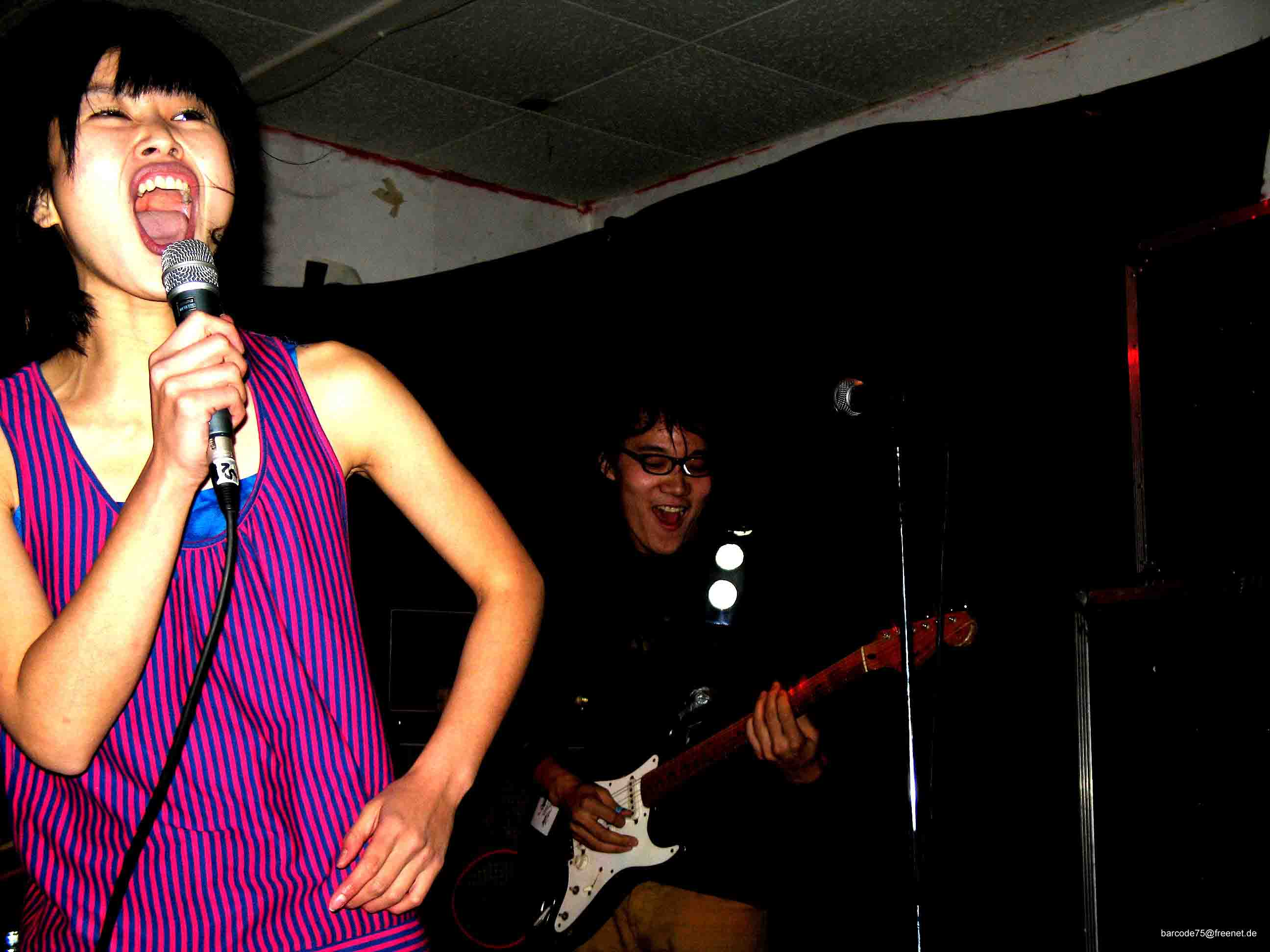

Background information
- Origin: Kansai, Japan
- Years active: 1998–present
- Label: Tzadik
- Members: Yukari (bass, vocals); Jinichiro Iida (guitar, vocals); Josh (drums)
- Past members: Koji Narazaki (drums)
- Website: www.limited-ex.com/infos.htm

Limited Express (Has Gone?) is a band from Kansai, Japan, who formed in 1998. Its members are Yukari (bass, vocals), Jinichiro Iida (guitar, vocals) and Josh (drums, backing vocals).

== Biography ==
The band's first album, Feeds You, was released in 2003 after John Zorn heard a copy of the band's demo and asked them to record an album for his Tzadik label. Koji Narazaki (drums) left the band in 2005.

The band released their sixth album, perfect ME, on tape format on the Hardcore Detonation label on March 26, 2019.

== Touring ==
In March 2004, the band toured the United States, including a show at the SXSW festival in Austin, Texas. Later that year, the band embarked on its first tour of small venues in Australia and New Zealand. One Melbourne show was recorded and later released as "Live at the 101 Bar" on the Tenzenmen label.

In July 2005, Limited Express toured Australia (with Rogers Sisters), followed by Korea. In May 2006, Limited Express headlined the Soobiesta festival in Brisbane, Australia, and released the Ikenie no Jesus Child EP.

== Discography ==
- Feeds You (2003)
- Makes You Dance! (2005)
- Live at the 101 Bar (2005)
- Ikenie no Jesus Child (2006)
- The Best Is Coming (2007), compilation
- LTD (2009)
- Just Image (2013)
- ALL AGES (2016)
- perfect ME (2019)
- Tell Your Story (2023)
