= When We Break =

Studio album by Criteria
- Released: August 23, 2005
- Recorded: C Plus Studio - Omaha, Nebraska; Presto! Recording Studios - Lincoln, Nebraska
- Genre: Indie rock
- Length: 36:02
- Label: Saddle Creek LBJ-81
- Producer: AJ Mogis

Criteria chronology
En Garde (2003)	When We Break (2005)

Professional ratings
Review scores
Source	Rating
Allmusic	link
IGN	5.8/10 30 Aug 05
Pitchfork Media	4.8/10 17 Aug 05
PopMatters	3/10 19 Aug 05

When We Break is the second release by indie-rock band Criteria. It was released August 23, 2005 on Saddle Creek Records.

The CD-release party was held in Omaha, Nebraska on August 20, 2005, at the Sokol Underground. Facing New York and local band, The Stay Awake opened the show.

This album is the 81st release of Saddle Creek Records.

== Track listing ==
1. "Prevent the World" – 2:43
2. "Draped in the Blood" – 2:33
3. "Good Luck" – 2:46
4. "Kiss the Wake" – 3:47
5. "Grey Matter" – 3:10
6. "Salt in Game" – 3:41
7. "Self Help" – 3:11
8. "Run Together" – 3:08
9. "Ride the Snake" – 3:07
10. "On Time" – 2:49
11. "Connections" – 5:00

== Musicians/Help ==
- Steve Pedersen - Guitar, Vocals, Recording
- Aaron Druery - Guitar
- AJ Mogis - Bass, Vocals, Recording, Engineering, Mixing
- Mike Sweeney - Drums
- Doug Van Sloun - Mastering
