= Slowdown (venue) =

Entertainment venue in Omaha, Nebraska

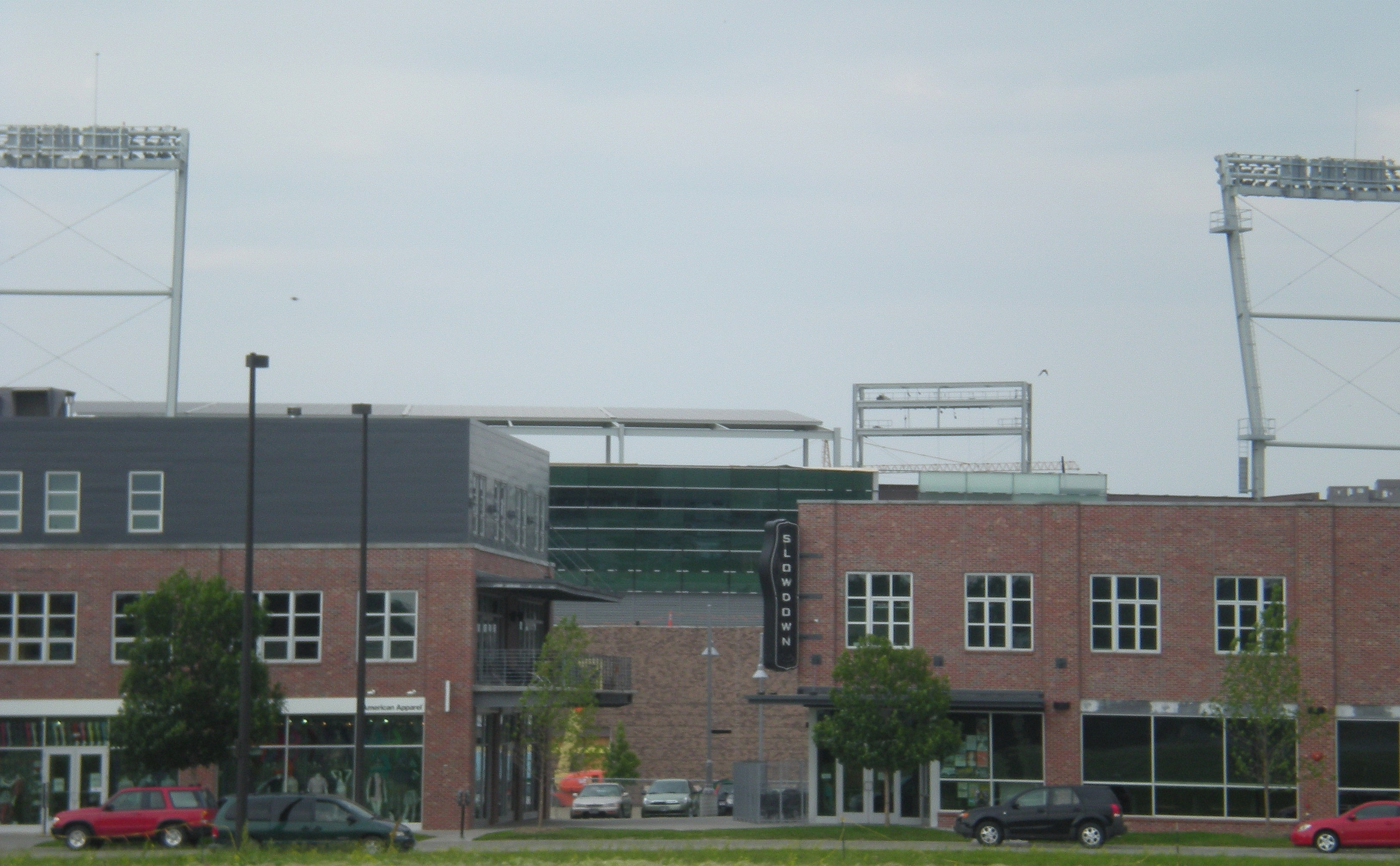
- The Slowdown venue in NoDo
- Interactive map of Slowdown
- Address: 729 North 14th Street
- Location: Omaha, Nebraska
- Coordinates: 41°15′59″N 95°56′03″W
- Owner: Saddle Creek Records
- Capacity: 750

Construction
- Opened: 2007

Website
- theslowdown.com

Slowdown is an entertainment venue located in the NoDo neighborhood of Omaha, Nebraska. A combination of a live music venue, shops, restaurants, and apartments, the venue was developed by Saddle Creek Records as a direct competitor to the Sokol Auditorium in Little Bohemia. Slowdown is said to be "unlike anything in Omaha - or the Midwest" because of its comprehensive, mixed-use design. The venue is named after the influential 1990s-era group Slowdown Virginia, who had a strong influence on the "Omaha Sound". Slowdown has shows three to four nights each week, as well as a weekly pub quiz. The venue is open one hour before each event and stays open until around 2am, often offering a post-show Happy Hour. Slowdown's shows are usually all ages unless otherwise specified, but on nights with no event, the venue functions as a bar. Slowdown bills itself as a place for "[r]ock shows, socializing, dancing, going to the bathroom, sitting, standing, walking, pool, video games, board games, some light reading, etc."

== History ==
Slowdown began in 2000 as an idea to start a rock club. Jason Kulbel and Robb Nansel started with the idea to renovate a space somewhere in the downtown area and give Omaha the permanent music venue they felt it was lacking. As it became apparent that the perfect space for renovation was just not out there, Robb and Jason spent most of their time working on the expansion of Saddle Creek Records. In 2004, they decided that the renovation of an old space was never going to be ideal and started looking around for some land to buy. The intention now was to build a permanent home for both Slowdown and Saddle Creek.

Fortuitously, the "perfect" spot was found on Saddle Creek Road in midtown Omaha. However, there was strong opposition to the development from local residents, and those plans were scrapped. Jason and Robb were approached by the City of Omaha to find the right place to build Slowdown. A few different options were considered, and the one that seemed to make the most sense was on a plot of land the city offered just south of Omaha's Near North Side and a few blocks west of the Qwest Center. Slowdown is surrounded by a Zipline Brewing Co., Saddle Creek Records, Film Streams, Rally Coffee Co., and apartments along with some other local businesses.

The city proposed kick-starting the rebuilding of the north downtown area, and with the help of J Development and Alley Poyner Machietto Architecture, the Saddle Creek/Slowdown building quickly became a part of a "development".
