= The Enright House =

- Origin: Christchurch, New Zealand
- Genres: Post-rock
- Years active: 2000–2010
- Labels: A Low Hum, Sleepy Bedroom Operations
- Members: Mark Roberts
- Website: www.theenrighthouse.com

The Enright House was the moniker under which Mark Roberts wrote, recorded and performed music. The project began in Chicago in 2001, and, after Roberts moved to New Zealand, was based in Christchurch from 2004 until 2009. After touring the United States in early 2009, Roberts relocated back to America and currently resides in Brooklyn, New York. In 2011, Roberts announced that he was retiring The Enright House to focus on his new project, We Are Temporary.

Whilst in New Zealand, The Enright House performed in various formations, including solo performances, duos, trios, and, at one point, even a four-piece live band, including Simon Gemmill (drums/percussion), Evan Schaare (synthesisers) and Thomas Lambert (guitar).

The band's frontman and songwriter Mark Roberts cites influences in post-rock, electronic and classical music, minimalism, art and philosophy, and describes his lyrical style as narrative and autobiographical, often explicitly depicting past personal experiences and memories.

The Enright House made its debut release in 2006 with the extended play Broken Hands, issued as part of A Low Hum's monthly magazine, which routinely included compilations and unreleased material by New Zealand artists. The following year, the band would release their first full-length studio album A Maze and Amazement on A Low Hum's label.

== History ==
The Enright House was founded in 2000 by guitarist and electronic musician Mark Roberts, whilst studying music and composition in Chicago. The name is a reference to a house in Ayn Rand's novel The Fountainhead. Roberts recorded his own music under this alias largely independent of any input from others and was apprehensive towards performing live until 2006, when his songs, uploaded to MySpace, caught the attention of A Low Hum's founder Ian "Blink" Jogensen. That year, The Enright House would release its debut EP Broken Hands and recruit Simon Gemmill and Evan Schaare to the band's live lineup, with Thomas Lambert to join mid-2007. The band started playing live as a group in late 2006.

In 2007, The Enright House released the split EP The Enright House Versus Kill the Zodiac on A Low Hum, and later released their full-length debut, A Maze and Amazement to positive reviews from New Zealand publications.

The band performed at the Southern Amp festival in November 2007, alongside established New Zealand artists such as Shihad and Evermore, and the following year at the Rhythm & Vines festival. After three New Zealand tours in 2006, 2007, and 2008, Roberts and Schaare showcased at 2009's SXSW, followed by a 9-week US-tour, beginning in March 2009 and commencing in May of the same year.

After the tour, Roberts remained in America, eventually settling in Brooklyn, New York, where he is currently working on We Are Temporary's debut album.
