= Desaparecidos (band) =

American punk rock band

- Origin: Omaha, Nebraska, U.S.
- Genres: Indie rock; punk rock; emo; post-hardcore
- Years active: 2001–2002, 2010, 2012–2015
- Labels: Saddle Creek, Wichita, Epitaph
- Spinoff of: Bright Eyes
- Past members: Conor Oberst; Landon Hedges; Matt Baum; Denver Dalley; Ian McElroy

Desaparecidos was an American punk rock band from Omaha, Nebraska founded by singer/guitarist Conor Oberst.

== History ==
=== Formation, Read Music/Speak Spanish, and hiatus (2001–2010) ===
The band formed in 2001 featuring Bright Eyes frontman Conor Oberst and several touring musicians from the same band and other life-long friends of Oberst's. The band name, Spanish and Portuguese for "disappeared ones" is inspired by those from the forcibly disappeared under Augusto Pinochet's right-wing military dictatorship in Chile between 1973 and 1990. Contrary to popular belief, guitarist Denver Dalley was the band's primary songwriter, and not Oberst.

They released their debut EP The Happiest Place on Earth on October 2, 2001. The band was recording and mixing their debut record when the September 11 attacks occurred and originally planned to shelve the release, but later released their debut album Read Music/Speak Spanish on February 11, 2002, passing on major record labels to release it on Omaha based Saddle Creek Records. The record, while having favorable reviews, was criticized due to the timing of the release, with an attendee at one show calling them "treasonous" for performing it so soon after the September 11 attacks. The album later gained a cult following, and the band toured in support of it through 2002, including opening for Jimmy Eat World and Motion City Soundtrack, and being featured on an MTV You Hear it First episode.

Desaparecidos went on hiatus at the end of 2002. With the continually increasing success of Bright Eyes, Oberst did not have the time to dedicate to the band. Oberst continued to record with Bright Eyes, while the other members of Desaparecidos went on to form other projects. Matt Baum joined The '89 Cubs, later drumming Race for Titles and the Coffin Killers; Ian McElroy formed Rig 1; Denver Dalley moved onto bands Statistics and Intramural; Landon Hedges founded Little Brazil.

=== Reunion, signing to Epitaph, and Payola (2010–2015) ===
Desaparecidos reunited for a single show at the Concert for Equality in Omaha's Benson neighborhood on July 31, 2010, which fundraised for ACLU Nebraska's lawsuit against the city of Fremont, Nebraska in the aftermath of a referendum that attempted to barred undocumented individuals from residing in the town. In April 2012, the band launched an official website and announced that they would again reunite, this time to play Omaha's MAHA Fest. In August 2012 the band embarked on a short tour, their first since 2002. Speaking on what took them so long to reform, Baum stated "We were all just busy with different stuff. Obviously Conor was doing his stuff and I was trying to be an adult for a little while there and it didn't work out. Real life is what happened, basically."

The band released two new tracks, "MariKKKopa" and "Backsell" in August 2012, the first recorded material since their return. The song "MariKKKopa" was written in reference to Sheriff Joe Arpaio of Maricopa County, Arizona and his outspoken stance and civil rights abuses he's committed against undocumented immigrants.

In February 2013, the band made available two tracks, "Anonymous" and "The Left is Right" via stream through Rolling Stone. The songs deal with the Anonymous hacker group and the Occupy movement. On August 2, 2013, the band released a new single "Te Amo Camila Vallejo", b/w "The Underground Man", which was dedicated to the Chilean student activist Camila Vallejo.

On January 27, 2015, the band announced that they had signed to Epitaph Records. Speaking on the decision to sign with Epitaph over Saddle Creek, Oberst stated "After years, it kind of soured a little bit and we happened to go our own way. I wish all of them the best, but we knew we weren't gonna do it with them and we started talking about what label would make sense with our band, and what's the label we respect, and can get it out there, and Epitaph was the very first one." On April 7, They released the single "City on the Hill." on YouTube and announced their second album Payola, their first album in thirteen years. It was later released on June 23, 2015. and was co-produced with Mike Mogis. The album contains the six tracks released since reforming as well as eight additional tracks.

The band went on tour with Joyce Manor and The So So Glos to promote the new album, including a show at Shea Stadium that would later be released as a live album, and a slot at Riot Fest 2015. On October 28, 2015, Oberst was hospitalized due to "laryngitis, anxiety, and exhaustion," and the rest of the bands remaining tour dates, including a benefit show that was to include Tom Morello, were cancelled and Oberst returned to his hometown of Omaha to recuperate. The shows were never rescheduled following the cancellations. Oberst later returned to working on solo music, and eventually reunited with Bright Eyes in 2020.

=== Second hiatus and re-releases (2016–present) ===
Since the cancellation of the tour in October 2015, the band has not toured or released new music. A 20th anniversary edition of Read Music/Speak Spanish, featuring remastered tracks and the two songs from The Happiest Place on Earth EP, was released on February 15, 2022. A live album Live at Shea Stadium was released April 1, 2022, featuring recordings from the band's performance at Shea Stadium in Brooklyn. New York on June 25, 2015.

== Musical style and influences ==
The band's sound was labeled "full-on emo-in-the-garage" by Alternative Press, "the sort of howlingly tuneful Midwestern punk that disappeared with Hüsker Dü" by Entertainment Weekly, "anthemic thrash" by Rolling Stone, and as such is noted for its sonic differences from Oberst's primary band. They have also been hailed as the "Saddle Creek supergroup". Hailing from Omaha, Nebraska, Desaparecidos' lyrics are mostly about the sociopolitical state of affairs in America. The band has been both lauded and criticized for its intentionally raw sound following the release of Read Music/Speak Spanish. In sharp contrast to Bright Eyes' confessional, even sometimes mournful lyrics, Desaparecidos's angular, energetic and engaging vocals sound like those typically heard in post-hardcore.

Desaparecidos have cited several bands as influences, including Slowdown Virginia, Cursive, Weezer, Fugazi, and Pixies.

== Members ==
- Conor Oberst — vocals, guitar
- Landon Hedges — bass guitar, vocals
- Matt Baum — drums
- Denver Dalley — guitar
- Ian McElroy — keyboards

== Discography ==
=== Albums ===
- Read Music/Speak Spanish (2002, Saddle Creek Records)
- Payola (2015, Epitaph Records)

=== EPs ===
- The Happiest Place on Earth (2001, Saddle Creek Records)
- What's New For Fall (2001, Wichita Recordings)

Both EPs contain the same tracks in a different order.

=== Live ===
- Live at Shea Stadium 6.25.15 (2022, Freeman Street Records & Shea Stadium Records)

=== Singles ===
- "MariKKKopa" / "Backsell" (2012, self-released)
- "Anonymous" / "The Left Is Right" (2013, self-released)
- "Te Amo Camila Vallejo" / "The Underground Man" (2013, self-released)

=== Compilation albums ===
- NE vs. NC (2002, Redemption Recording Co.)

song: "What's New for Fall"

- Saddle Creek 50 (2002, Saddle Creek Records)

songs: "Man and Wife, the Latter (Damaged Goods)", "Popn' Off at the F"

- Punk Rock Strike Volume Three: Third Strike (2002, Springman Records)

song: "The Happiest Place On Earth"

- Liberation: Songs to Benefit PETA (2003, Fat Wreck Chords)

song: "Man and Wife, the Latter (Damaged Goods)"

== See also ==
- The '89 Cubs
- Bright Eyes
- Little Brazil
- Statistics
