= Slowdown Virginia =

American indie rock band

- Origin: Omaha, Nebraska, USA
- Genres: Indie Rock
- Years active: 1993–1995, 2010
- Label: Lumberjack Records
- Past members: Tim Kasher; Matt Maginn; Steve Pedersen; Casey Caniglia

Slowdown Virginia was an indie rock band from Omaha, Nebraska. Formed in 1993, the band recorded and released one album, Dead Space, on Lumberjack Records in 1994, the predecessor to today's Saddle Creek Records. After playing an influential role in inspiring the later formation of other Omaha bands like Bright Eyes, The Faint, and Desaparecidos with their energetic live shows and recordings, Slowdown Virginia broke up in the spring of 1995. A month after breaking up, Kasher, Maginn, and Pedersen regrouped with a new drummer to form Cursive. Omaha's mixed entertainment venue Slowdown is named in honor of the band.

== Biography ==
=== The March Hares and formation as Slowdown Virginia (1990–93) ===
Slowdown Virginia evolved from a five-piece cover band called The March Hares, composed of high school friends Jim Robino, Tim Kasher, Matt Maginn, Steven Pedersen, and Casey Caniglia. Pedersen replaced original guitarist Matt Oberst. The band formed around 1990 while the five attended Creighton Prep in Omaha, Nebraska. The March Hares played local shows, mainly performing covers of The Cure, R.E.M., The Pixies, and other alternative rock bands. Eventually the band began writing a few of their own songs.

Robino left the band in 1993, and Kasher took over on lead vocals and the group continued as a four-piece. The band renamed itself Slowdown Virginia — likely after Kasher's cat at the time, named Virginia — and started to focus on writing and recording original music.

=== Active years and Dead Space (1993–95) ===
With a sound described as a "heartland Pavement" or emo in the style of Rites of Spring or Minor Threat, the band started by recording a five-song cassette demo as cheaply as they could to have something to hand out or sell at live shows. To do so they ended up traveling from Omaha to Otho, Iowa, recording at a chicken coop converted into a studio called Junior's Motel. The band continued to travel to record demos at Junior's Motel throughout 1993, mixing the tapes themselves back in Omaha. The band began playing regular shows around Omaha, building a fanbase through live performances and the cassette demos.

Knowing that the band was recording demos and had interest from record labels, friend of the band's and fellow Omaha musician Ted Stevens convinced the band to record and put out an LP on compact disc with a local label, Lumberjack Records, as its third release after Conor Oberst's Water on cassette and a release from Steven's own band, Polecat, on vinyl. With the agreement, Stevens set out with the help of Conor and Justin Oberst to raise the $1,500 it would cost for 500 CDs. The resulting album, Dead Space, was released locally in 1994 and has never been reissued.

=== Breakup and later influence (1995–present) ===
Despite recording enough material for a second album, Slowdown Virginia broke up in the spring of 1995. The band played their final show at the Cultural Center in Lincoln, Nebraska in April of that year. Caniglia had decided to quit making music, and Kasher intended to leave for the University of Kansas. Only a month later, however, Clint Schnase from Pedersen's other band, Smashmouth, joined Kasher, Pedersen, and Maginn to form Cursive. Kasher and the other band members intended to take music and the new band much more seriously, something they felt they didn't do with Slowdown Virginia, "decid[ing] with Cursive we would write the best we could, believe in it, and if everyone ended up hating it – well, we would deal with it." Pedersen would depart Cursive in 1998 to later be replaced by Ted Stevens.

Slowdown Virginia had a lasting influence on the music of Omaha, specifically the success and enthusiasm around the live shows and releasing Dead Space locally in inspiring bands that would become the nucleus of Saddle Creek Records. Conor Oberst of Commander Venus, Bright Eyes and Desaparecidos specifically cites Slowdown Virginia as an influence for going on to make music; Todd Fink and Clark Baechle from The Faint express similar inspiration. The influence of the band's music and live shows played a role in decision to name Saddle Creek's mixed-entertainment complex in Omaha's Near North Side Slowdown in their honor. The venue opened in 2007, and in 2010 Slowdown Virginia reunited at the venue without Kasher to play one show with Polecat.

== Band members ==
- Tim Kasher: guitar, vocals
- Matt Maginn: bass, vocals
- Steve Pedersen: guitar
- Casey Caniglia: drums
- Jim Robino: lead vocals (The March Hares)

== Discography ==
- Dead Space (1994; Lumberjack Records LBJ-03)

== See also ==
- Criteria
- Cursive
- Smashmouth
