= En Garde (album) =

Studio album by Criteria
- Released: 2003
- Label: Initial Records

Criteria chronology
En Garde (2003)	When We Break (2005)

Professional ratings
Review scores
Source	Rating
Allmusic	3/5 stars

En Garde is the debut album of indie-rock band, Criteria. Formed by one of the founding members of Cursive, Steve Pedersen came back to his hometown of Omaha, Nebraska after graduating from Duke University. He recruited the help of old friends, Aaron Druery, A.J. Mogis, and Mike Sweeney. Originally released by Initial Records, it was re-released in 2005 when the band moved to Saddle Creek Records.

This album is the 80th release of Saddle Creek Records.

== Track listing ==
(all songs written by Stephen Pedersen)

1. "The Coincidence" – 2:35
2. "Mainline Life" – 2:36
3. "Play on Words" – 4:48
4. "Talk in a Crowded Room" - 1:43
5. "The Life" – 2:45
6. "Me On Your Front Porch" – 3:26
7. "It Happens" – 2:33
8. "The Slider" – 2:24
9. "Thorn Sharp" - 3:24
10. "Rescue Rescue" - 4:26

== Musicians/Help ==
- Steve Pedersen - Guitar, Vocals, Engineering
- Mike Sweeney
- AJ Mogis - Engineering, Mixing
- Ian McElroy
- Ryan Fox
- Conor Oberst
- Matt Baum
- Doug Van Sloun - Mastering

== Trivia ==
- The CD contains a hidden track in zero time (go to track 1 and then rewind) and features a song by Team Rigge, the lyrics are response to The Show is the Rainbow's song, "Up a Creek without a Saddle," which disses Conor Oberst.
