= Disasteradio =

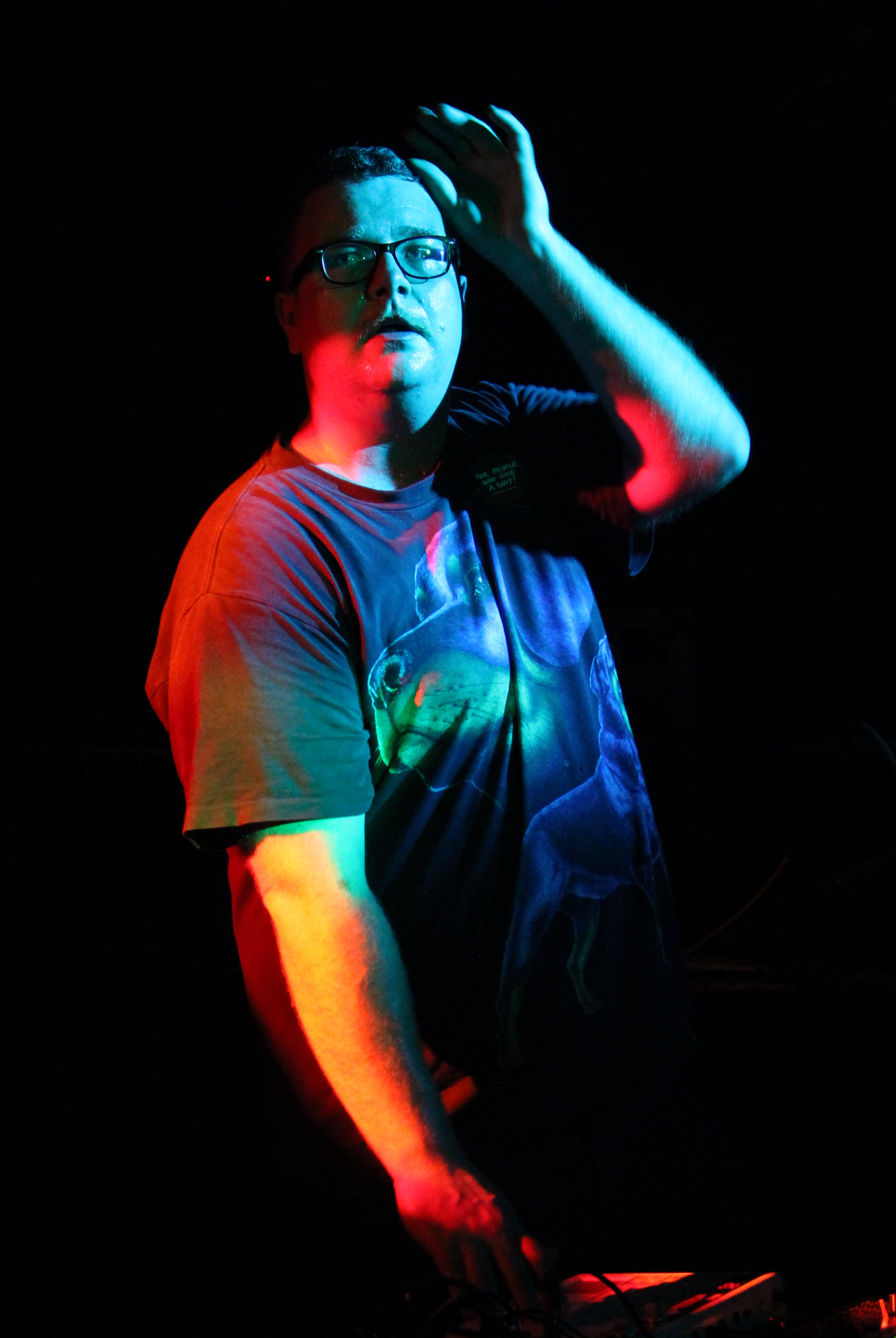
- Disasteradio at San Francisco Bath House, Wellington, in 2015

Background information
- Also known as: Eyeliner; Super Doobie Bros
- Born: Luke Rowell; 1983 (age 42–43); Lower Hutt
- Genres: Electronica; synthpop; chiptune; vaporwave
- Instruments: Vocals; vocoder; computer; synthesizer; Akai MPC
- Years active: 1999–present
- Label: A Low Hum

Luke Rowell (born 1983), also known as Disasteradio and Eyeliner, is a New Zealand electronic musician from Lower Hutt. He began writing a mixture of chiptune and synthpop in 1999 and has released eight albums, toured New Zealand over ten times and completed several tours of Europe, and two of the US.

In 2012, Rowell created the pseudonym Eyeliner to explore vaporwave, and has since released five Eyeliner albums.

== History ==
Beginning as Disasteradio in 1999, Rowell released free albums for a number of years on mp3.com, BeSonic and IUMA. He released his first self-titled CD-R in 2002, selling at live shows and through Wellingtonian Kerry Ann Lee's zine distro "Red Letter".

Disasteradio's first live show was in 2002 supporting Atom and his Package. Subsequent shows that year were supporting bands in the local punk and hardcore scenes. In 2003, Blink, who ran local Wellington label A Low Hum saw Disasteradio play a show at Wellington's Thistle Hall. The two have worked closely together ever since – beginning with Disasteradio playing two New Zealand tours in 2004 under the A LOW HUM banner. Late 2004 saw the release of "Hotline", which had notable impact on student radio locally, reaching the top position on New Zealand's bNet stations in Wellington, Dunedin and Auckland.

After the success of Hotline at Student Radio, Disasteradio signed a record deal in 2004, with the now defunct Wellington-based label Capital Recordings to release his next record "Synthtease". After six months of delays, he was released from his deal and this album was released with longtime supporter A Low Hum. In 2006 Disasteradio released a further two records, the first a short-run limited edition cassette tape on Wanganui label Stink Magnetic. Titled "Datasette", it carried a mixture of previously released and new material. His first ever non CD-R CD release "Synthtease" was released on A Low Hum in April 2006, with a nationwide New Zealand tour alongside Surf City and Voom.

In 2007 Disasteradio released his most commercially successful and critically acclaimed album "Visions". It was voted the best New Zealand release of 2007 by leading music magazine Real Groove and received glowing reviews from Vice NZ, The Dominion Post, NZ Musician, NZ Herald Under The Radar and student magazine Critic

In 2007 Disasteradio also headlined the inaugural Camp A Low Hum music festival in Wellington. He would also go on to headline at the 2008 and 2009 events.

In 2008 Disasteradio was invited by Hans Nieswandt to perform at the New Zealand night of Worldtronics Festival in Berlin. The following year during the Northern Hemisphere summer, Disasteradio embarked on a 5-month World tour playing shows in seventeen countries, including all of Western Europe and the USA. He returned to Europe late 2009 returning to several countries and also including Norway.

"Charisma" was released in October 2010 with A Low Hum as pay-as-you-like or free mp3 on bandcamp.com. It was subsequently released on vinyl and CD.

In 2011 Disasteradio became a minor internet celebrity when his 'Gravy Rainbow' video got featured on several blogs starting with Tosh.O's Friday WTF feature. The video has gone on to as of January, 2023, receive 1,050,000+ views.

In 2011 Disasteradio supported Australian band Regurgitator on an 18 date tour throughout Australia.

2015 saw Disasteradio support The Phoenix Foundation on their New Zealand tour

In 2017, Disasteradio released "Sweatshop" as pay-as-you-like or free mp3 on bandcamp.com. Pay-as-you-like purchases of this album included the 6-track instrumental EP "Sweatpants".

== Discography ==
=== As Disasteradio ===
==== Studio albums ====
- Disasteradio (2002) — independent CDR
- System That Never Fails (2003) — independent CDR
- DSIR: Dance Self-Instruction Record (2003) — independent CDR
- Western Digital (2004) — independent CDR
- Synthtease (2006) — A Low Hum
- Visions (2007) — A Low Hum
- Charisma (2011) — A Low Hum
- Sweatshop (2017) — independent

==== EPs ====
- Sellout Ringtones (2010) — independent
- Super Doobie Bros (2011) (as Super Doobie Bros) — independent
- Electric Blanket (2013) — Crystal Magic
- Sweatpants: B-Side Dance Party (2017) — independent

==== Singles ====
- "A Low Hum Singles Club" (2007) — A Low Hum
- "Fax of Life" (2008) — independent Atari 2600 Cartridge

=== As Eyeliner ===
==== Studio albums ====
- High Fashion Mood Music (2012) — Crystal Magic
- LARP of Luxury (2013) — Crystal Magic
- Buy Now (2015) — Beer on the Rug
- Drop Shadow (2020) — Orange Milk Records
- brb (2023) — My Pet Flamingo

== Trivia ==
Real Groove Magazine's continuing series of compilations of New Zealand-based musicians titled "Awesome Feeling" is named after Disasteradio's single "Awesome Feelings" which featured on the first compilation.

The name Disasteradio was taken from an image of the Crystal Radio of the same name in radio art book Made in Japan: Transistor Radios of the 1950s and 1960s by Handy, Erbe, Blackham, Antonier (1993) (ISBN 0-8118-0271-X)
