= Dead Space (album) =

Studio album by Slowdown Virginia
- Released: 1994
- Genre: Power pop
- Label: Lumberjack Records

Professional ratings
Review scores
Source	Rating
Allmusic	2.5/5 stars

Dead Space was the only album released by the Omaha, Nebraska based rock band Slowdown Virginia. Distributed by Lumberjack Records (which later became Saddle Creek) in 1994, copies of the album spread locally on compact disc. Slowdown Virginia broke up shortly after the release of the album, with three of the four members forming the band Cursive a month later.

== Track listing ==
1. Supernova '75
2. Dave Mustang
3. Vicki My Sick Gills
4. Whipping Stick
5. Martian Landing
6. Dave Mustang Reprise
7. Breaking Branches
8. Blame
9. Cross-Eyed
10. Fork in My Socket
11. Another Slip
12. Untitled
13. Juan Pablo Shoe
