= Tourism/Terrorism =

EP by The So So Glos
- Released: October 21, 2008
- Recorded: August 2008
- Studio: Sor Studios, Staten Island, New York
- Genre: Punk rock
- Label: Green Owl Records

The So So Glos chronology
The So So Glos (2007)	Tourism/Terrorism (2008)	Blowout (2013)

Tourism/Terrorism is an EP by the New York City-based punk rock band the So So Glos, released on October 21, 2008 on Green Owl Records. It is their second release overall, following their 2007 self-titled debut album. It won the "Best Punk Album" category at the 9th annual Independent Music Awards.

Professional ratings
Review scores
Source	Rating
The 405	5/10
AllMusic	3/5 stars
BBC Music	(favorable)
DIY	6/10
Loud and Quiet	3/10
MSN Music (Consumer Guide)	A–

== Track listing ==
1. "There's a War" – 0:31
2. "My Block" – 3:34
3. "Throw Your Hands Up" – 3:34
4. "Isn't It a Shame" – 3:28
5. "Love or Empire" – 3:57
6. "There's a War" (Holiday Version) – 0:55
7. "Execution" – 3:04
8. "Island Loops" – 3:41
9. "Underneath the Universe" – 5:03

== Personnel ==
=== The So So Glos ===
- Matt Elkin
- Alex Levine
- Ryan Levine
- Zach Staggers

=== Other ===
- Andrew French – photography
- Nathan James – mastering
- Adam Reach – audio engineering, audio production
- Spidey – mixing
