= Menergy =

Studio album by The White Octave
- Released: Jun 29, 2001
- Recorded: Chase Park Transduction, Athens, Georgia
- Genre: Indie rock
- Length: 45.03
- Label: Initial Records LBJ-81
- Producer: Bob Weston

Professional ratings
Review scores
Source	Rating
AllMusic	3/5 stars
Kerrang!	4/5 stars

Menergy is the second album by The White Octave. It was released in 2001 by Initial Records.

== Critical reception ==
Indy Week wrote that the album "aches with intelligently structured, sincerely emotive indie-rock a la D.C. post-punk, soaring and cresting across a variety of rhythms and combinations of bass/two-guitars/drums." AllMusic called it "quirky, jangled nerdy rock with catchy riffs and a passionate demeanor."

== Track listing ==
All tracks are written by Pedersen, Cohen, Hancock, Biggers. (Source: https://thewhiteoctave.bandcamp.com/album/menergy).

Menergy track listing
No.	Title	Length
1.	"The Constant Is Zero"	2:52
2.	"Splashed into Serpents"	4:18
3.	"Animal Chin"	3:44
4.	"La Vista"	7:05
5.	"Wait"	3:59
6.	"The House Is Flatlined"	2:27
7.	"Powerlines"	2:51
8.	"Move in Time"	5:52
9.	"Weight"	5:05
10.	"Menstrumental"	3:34
