= Criteria (band) =

American indie rock band

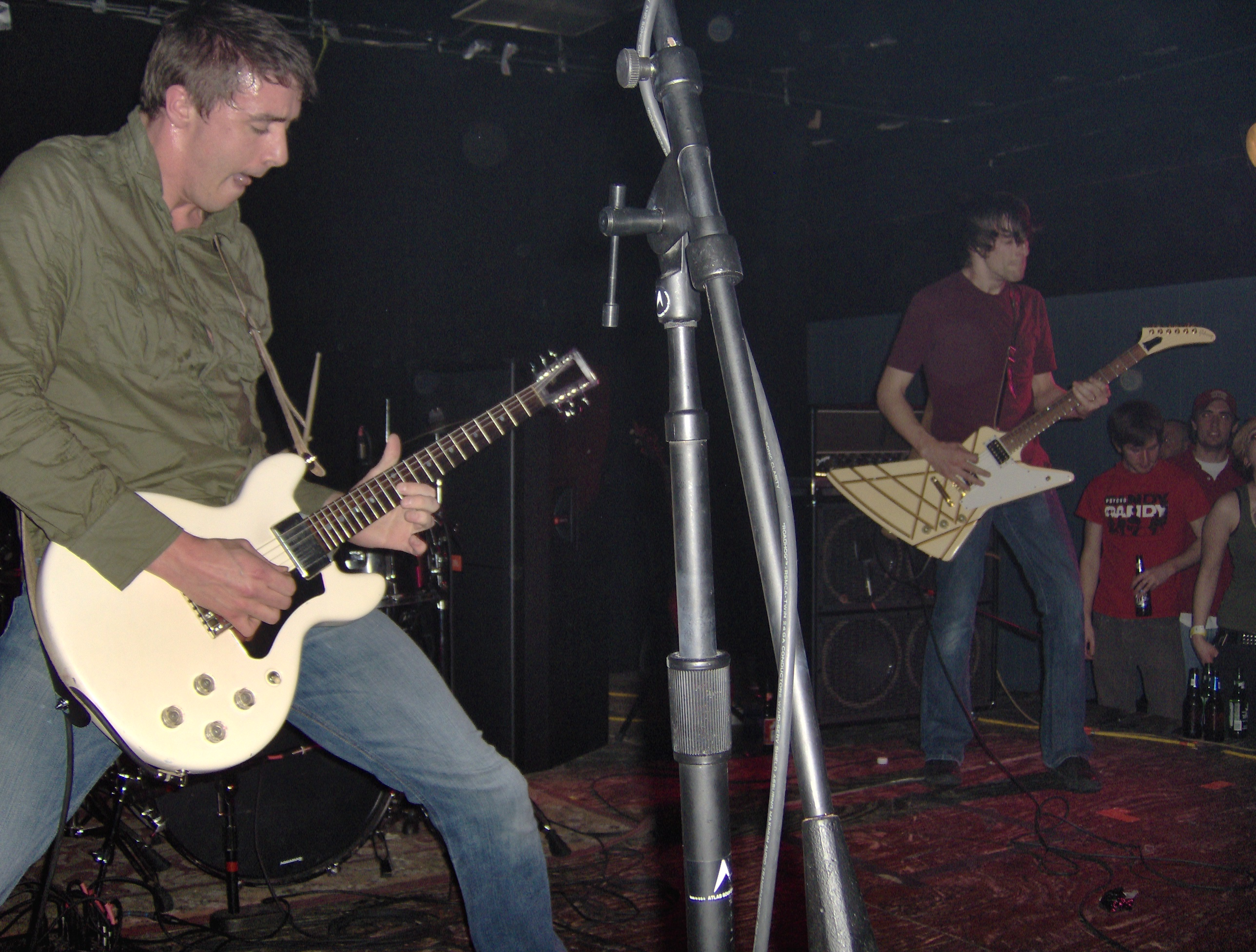
- Steve Pedersen (left) and Aaron Druery (right) of Criteria perform at Omaha's Sokol Underground in 2006.

Background information
- Origin: Omaha, Nebraska, United States
- Genre: Indie rock
- Years active: 2003–present
- Labels: Saddle Creek, 15 Passenger, Initial, Spartan
- Members: Steve Pedersen; Aaron Druery; A.J. Mogis; Mike Sweeney
- Website: https://15passenger.com/criteria

Criteria is an indie rock band from Omaha, Nebraska, formed in 2003 when former Cursive founding member Steve Pedersen returned to his hometown after graduating from the Duke University School of Law.

== History ==
Wanting to move on from the "angular, atonal" sound of his previous band the White Octave, Steve Pedersen began work on new, more melodic songs. He spent six months in a friend's basement, where he wrote all ten songs for his new project's debut album. He recruited the help of some old friends, A.J. Mogis (of Presto! Recording Studios and Lullaby for the Working Class) on bass guitar, Aaron Druery on guitar, and Mike Sweeney of Beep Beep on drums. Their first album, En Garde, was released on his previous band's label, Initial Records.

At the time, Pedersen worked as a lawyer for Omaha firm Kutak Rock, which made it difficult to promote the album. Initial Records went bankrupt about a year after, leaving Criteria without a label. Saddle Creek Records took their longtime friend in and put out three releases in 2005. The first was a re-release of the LP En Garde, their new single, "Prevent the World," and their second full-length, When We Break. After signing with Saddle Creek, Pedersen quit his day job to make music and tour full-time.

Criteria has performed with bands such as Cursive, The Fall of Troy, Thunderbirds Are Now!, Statistics, Poison the Well, Rahim (band), and Minus the Bear. Mogis, Druery, and Pedersen have since started families, and as a result Criteria has become a strictly part-time venture.

The band performed at the Maha Musical Festival on August 17, 2013, in Omaha, Nebraska. Criteria's most recent performance took place on December 12, 2013, at the Waiting Room Lounge in Omaha, during which Pedersen mentioned the band was working on a new album.

In 2020, Criteria released their latest album to date, Years, on Cursive's 15 Passenger label.

On February 26, 2026, the band announced their official signing to Spartan Records and their fourth studio album, SEIZE!, to be released on May 22 of the same year.

== Band members ==
- Steve Pedersen - vocals, guitar
- A.J. Mogis - backup vocals, bass guitar
- Aaron Druery - backup vocals, guitar
- Mike Sweeney - drums

== Discography ==
=== Albums ===
- En Garde (2003 · Initial Records) re-released 2005 on Saddle Creek Records
- When We Break (2005 · Saddle Creek Records)
- Years (2020 · 15 Passenger)
- SEIZE! (2026 · Spartan Records)

=== Singles and EPs ===
- "Prevent the World" single (2005 · Saddle Creek Records)

=== Compilations ===
- Lagniappe: A Saddle Creek Benefit for Hurricane Katrina (2005 · Saddle Creek Records)

song: "Booketa"

== Videography ==
- Prevent the World (2 versions, August 2005, directed by Jason Kulbel)
- Good Luck (March 2006), directed by Shafei and Levitz
- Kiss the Wake (March 2006, directed by Jaime O’Bradovich, Saddle Creek Music Video Competition at the Hot Shops Film Festival winner, runners-up: Luke Rustermier and Michael McClendon)

== See also ==
- Beep Beep
- Cursive
- Lullaby for the Working Class
- The Nein
- The White Octave
