= Luxury (The Nein album) =

Studio album by The Nein
- Released: February 20, 2007
- Genre: Indie rock, post-punk, art rock
- Length: 46:07
- Label: Sonic Unyon

The Nein chronology
Wrath of Circuits (2005)	Luxury (2007)

Professional ratings
Review scores
Source	Rating
Allmusic	3.5/5 stars

Luxury is the second full-length studio album by the indie rock band The Nein. It was released on February 20, 2007 on Sonic Unyon.

== Track listing ==
All songs written and composed by The Nein.

1. "Burn Construction"
2. "Attitude and Mirrors"
3. "Sweet Vague"
4. "Journalist, Pt. 1"
5. "Journalist, Pt. 2"
6. "Achilles Last Tape Solo"
7. "Ennio"
8. "Decollage"
9. "Radical Chic"
10. "Wreck-We-Um-Dub"
11. "Get Up"
12. "The Future Crumbles"
13. "A Landscape"

== Personnel ==
The Nein

- Finn Cohen – Vocals, guitar
- Robert Biggers – drum, keyboards
- Dale Flattum – Loops, sampling, tapes

Guest musicians

- Eric Roehrig – Background music, commentary
- Chris Rossi – Vibraphone

Production

- Matt Kalb – Engineering
- Chris Logan – A&R
- Ryan Granville Martin – Effects, mixing
- Finn Cohen – Programming
- Ramen Royale – Artwork
- Ben Spiker – Photography
