= A Maze and Amazement =

Studio album by the Enright House
- Released: May 2007
- Genre: Post-rock
- Length: 54:25
- Language: English, German
- Label: A Low Hum
- Producer: Mark V. Roberts

The Enright House chronology
A Maze and Amazement (2007)	In Perfect Blooms of Colour (2010)

A Maze and Amazement is the debut album by New Zealand post-rock band the Enright House, released in May 2007, on A Low Hum Records.

== Track listing ==
All tracks are written by Mark V. Roberts.

No.	Title	Length
1.	"Scattering the Sun Like Gunshot"	7:08
2.	"Darkwave Equals MC Squared"	2:51
3.	"Up"	2:53
4.	"A Maze and Amazement"	3:30
5.	"Solitare"	6:26
6.	"Remember the Stillness"	7:23
7.	"A Car Facing Mountains"	4:27
8.	"Do Re Mi"	4:17
9.	"On the Banks of the Rhein"	4:24
10.	"Kiss Kiss Bang Bang"	4:14
11.	"Rain"	3:09
12.	"We Might as Well Have Stayed Young"	3:43

== Personnel ==
- Mark Roberts – production, performance, vocals, art direction
- Tristen Deschain – guitar harmonics on "Darkwave Equals MC Squared"
- Mary E. Jones – poetry reading on "Solitare" and "Remember the Stillness", art direction
- Evan Schaare – synthesisers on "Do Re Mi"
- Nick Harte – drums on "We Might as Well Have Stayed Young"
- Amelia Radford – violas on "We Might as Well Have Stayed Young"

== Reception ==
New Zealand music site UnderTheRadar rated the album four hearts out of five, describing it as a mostly instrumental album and praising its "lush flowing arrangements scattered with intensity but also relaxed structure."
