= Tenzenmen =

tenzenmen is a distributor and promoter of DIY music, active in Sydney from 2004 to 2018, and now based in Thailand. Founded by Shaun Tenzenmen, the organisation has been involved in connecting independent artists around the world through touring and album releases.

== History ==
Started in Sydney during 2004, tenzenmen took its name from a previous project some 10 years before. tenzenmen released a much sought-after pink vinyl 12" recording titled Quarrychase on German label Very Good Records.

In the new century the name was revived with plans to release a series of CDs, the first being a 2 disc collection of recordings from the 2003 NOWnow festival. Soon followed by the first in the series of Eccentrics 3 band compilations and the second Kroko CD titled Rabia.

By the end of the year tenzenmen had successfully toured Japanese punk band Limited Express (has gone?) through Australia and New Zealand and started to dabble in tour organisation. Over a period of time this also developed into organising gigs for local and interstate bands in Sydney.

Also during this period tenzenmen became disenchanted with its forays into the music industry and started moving away from the traditional routes employed in the entertainment industry. This included self distribution of releases, distribution of other releases from around the world—including efforts from China, Finland and Malaysia—setting up stalls at gigs, organising gigs at warehouses, art spaces and youth centres.

Coming across many like minded people around the Asia region spawned the idea for a database of information to help bands/artists organise their own DIY tours around all the different countries. This information now resides at the Australasia DIY Tour Circuit.

Whilst looking at the global perspective with the Tour Circuit, tenzenmen is also encouraging more local activities which are documented weekly with the Cool and Unusual mail list.

== Releases ==
Eccentrics #1 CD (with Hinterlandt, Zu, Can Can Heads) - 2004
Eccentrics #2 CD (with Limited Express (has gone?), Stalwart, Plat ypus) - 2004
Eccentrics #3 CD (with Experimental Dental School, Sabot, Astro Can Caravan) - 2004
VA - NOWnow 2003 2xCD - 2004
Kroko - Rabia CD - 2004
ni-hao! - red, blue, green CD - 2005
Limited Express (has gone?) - live at the 101 bar CD - 2005
Live at Bar Open DVD (with Baseball, ni-hao!, Sabot, The Thaw) - 2006

== Tours ==
Limited Express (has gone?) - samurai-koala tour 2004 (Australia/New Zealand)
Sabot - Australia tour 2005
Limited Express (has gone?) - Makes You Dance tour 2005 (Australia)
ni-hao! - Gorgeous Red Blue Green Tour 2006 (Australia)
Limited Express (has gone?) - Australian tour 2006
Mykel Board - Australia/New Zealand tour 2007
