= Kutak Rock =

American law firm

Kutak Rock LLP
- Headquarters: Omaha, Nebraska
- No. of offices: 19
- No. of attorneys: 550
- No. of employees: 1,000
- Major practice areas: Corporate law, public finance, banking, real estate
- Key people: John L. Petr (chair); Hilary A. Jackler (vice chair)
- Date founded: 1965
- Founders: Robert J. Kutak; Harold L. Rock; William Campbell
- Company type: Limited liability partnership
- Website: KutakRock.com

Kutak Rock LLP is an American law firm, founded in 1965 in Omaha, Nebraska. As of January 2021, it had more than 550 attorneys in 19 offices across the United States.

== History ==
The firm was founded in Omaha in 1965 by Robert J. Kutak, Harold Rock, and William G. Campbell. After 1972 the firm pursued an aggressive expansion strategy, first by absorbing two other Omaha firms and then by adding offices in other cities, beginning in 1977 with offices in Denver and Washington, D.C. By 1978 the firm, with its main concentration in public finance law, was reported to be the fastest growing law firm in the United States.

Federal legislation in 1968 required American industry and business to commit to substantial expenditures over the next two decades to address the water and air pollution abatement requirements outlined in that legislation. In conjunction with its Wall Street investment banking clients, Kutak Rock pioneered the use of municipal debt backed solely by the relevant corporate credit (a form of transaction at that time known as industrial development revenue bond financing) to finance tens of billions of dollars of these requirements, thus establishing the foundation of the broad-ranging corporate and governmental finance practice that exists today in all of the firm's offices. The firm's national corporate, real estate, and litigation practices also began during this period.

Robert Kutak, a founder of the firm, chaired the American Bar Association commission which developed the new Model Rules of Professional Conduct and rewrote ethical standards for lawyers; the ABA offers a legal education award named after him. He was also instrumental in purchasing and preserving the Omaha National Bank Building for use as the firm's main office. He died of a heart attack in 1983, at age 50.

The firm reported gross revenue of $295.77 million for 2022, ranking 124th in The American Lawyer's Am Law 200 listing.

== Representation of First National Bank of Keystone ==
From 1993 until 1999 Kutak Rock acted as outside counsel to the First National Bank of Keystone, a national bank in Keystone, West Virginia. The Federal Deposit Insurance Corporation (FDIC) later described the firm as the bank's outside general counsel for that period. Partner Michael T. Lambert was the attorney in charge of the engagement. The Office of the Comptroller of the Currency (OCC) closed the bank on September 1, 1999 after examiners concluded that it was insolvent and had overstated its assets.

In May 2003 the firm and Lambert each signed a written agreement with the OCC. The agency stated that it had been prepared to allege that they had withheld significant information about bank management from the board and that the firm had acted under conflicts of interest arising from its representation of the bank alongside other clients. The firm agreed for three years to observe specified practices in representing insured depository institutions, and Lambert agreed not to provide legal services to such institutions; both agreements were entered into without admitting or denying liability. Separately, the FDIC settled its claims against the firm and Lambert for $22 million and released them from liability connected with the representation. A subsequent action against the firm by Grant Thornton, the bank's auditor, was dismissed as barred by that settlement, and the Supreme Court of Appeals of West Virginia affirmed in 2011.

== Legal malpractice litigation ==
In 2021 two limited liability companies formed to apply for cannabis dispensary licences sued the firm and one of its partners in the Circuit Court of Cook County, Illinois, alleging legal malpractice and related torts. According to the complaint, the corporate structure drawn up for them failed to give the intended holder the ownership and control required of a social equity applicant under the state's Cannabis Regulation and Tax Act, and two of their ten applications were rejected on that basis. The circuit court dismissed the complaint, finding both that the structure complied with the statute and that the loss of a chance to enter the licence lottery was not compensable under Illinois law.

On December 24, 2024 the Appellate Court of Illinois reversed the dismissal of the malpractice count, stating that it was not persuaded that the structure satisfied the statutory criteria and holding that damages for the lost chance of entering the lottery were recoverable because the odds could be calculated with mathematical precision. Dismissal of the remaining counts was affirmed and the case remanded. The court emphasised that its holding was confined to the facts before it and expressed no view on the availability of such damages in other malpractice actions. The Supreme Court of Illinois denied the firm's petition for leave to appeal on May 28, 2025.

== Notable alumni ==
- Robert Kutak, founder of the firm and chairman of the American Bar Association's Special Commission on Evaluation of Professional Standards
- Harold Rock, founder of the firm, former president of the Omaha Bar Association and Nebraska State Bar Association
- David Karnes, former U.S. Senator for Nebraska, was of counsel to the firm.
- David Bracht, former Nebraska Director of Energy, is of counsel to the firm.
- Bart McLeay, candidate for United States Senate for Nebraska in 2014.
- Lindsey Miller-Lerman, Justice of the Nebraska Supreme Court.
- Steve Pedersen, founding member of indie rock band Cursive.
- Brian C. Buescher, District Judge of the United States District Court for the District of Nebraska.
- Jacy J. Hurst, Judge of the Kansas Court of Appeals, was a partner in the firm's Kansas City office from 2017 until her appointment in 2021.
