= Ian McElroy =

Ian M. McElroy is a musician from Omaha, Nebraska, who played keyboards for Desaparecidos from 2001 to 2003 and was one of the founding members of the group. He played keyboards for Bright Eyes at one time and contributed to Criteria's album En Garde. Bright Eyes, Sorry About Dresden, Cursive, and Desaparecidos performed at a benefit concert for his brother Collin in 2001. McElroy's rap project, Rig. 1, is signed to Team Love Records, and released Above the Tree Line, West of the Periodic in 2008. Ian is also the cousin of indie musician and fellow Desaparecidos member Conor Oberst.

== Album appearances ==
- Criteria - En Garde (2003, Initial Records)
