= Denver Dalley =

American singer-songwriter

- Born: Denver Collin Dalley
- Origin: Omaha, Nebraska, United States
- Genres: Indie rock, alternative rock, electronica
- Occupations: Musician, songwriter
- Instruments: Vocals, guitar, bass guitar
- Years active: 2001–present
- Labels: Wichita, Saddle Creek, Jade Tree, Slowdance, Afternoon
- Formerly of: Desaparecidos

Denver Collin Dalley is an American singer-songwriter based in Omaha, Nebraska. He is best known for his collaboration with Bright Eyes frontman Conor Oberst in Desaparecidos, and has been involved in various other musical projects, including Statistics, Intramural, and PRESSERS.

== Career ==
=== Desaparecidos ===
Dalley collaborated with childhood friend Conor Oberst as main songwriter of the politically charged indie rock band Desaparecidos. The band released Read Music/Speak Spanish on Omaha-based Saddle Creek Records before going on hiatus in 2003. They reunited in 2010, performing at the Concert for Equality in Omaha on July 31, and again on July 31, 2012 at Omaha's Maha Music Festival.

=== Statistics ===
In 2003, following the temporary caesura of Desaparecidos, Dalley formed Statistics, an electronic-tinged solo project, and signed onto the Jade Tree Records label. After releasing a self-titled extended play in 2003 and two studio albums titled Leave Your Name and Often Lie in 2004 and 2005, respectively, Dalley chose to focus on other projects, effectively putting Statistics on hiatus. However, in 2013, eight years after Often Lie, Dalley released a new studio album titled Peninsula on Afternoon Records, featuring a collaboration with Minnesota-based singer-songwriter Sean Tillman (a.k.a. Har Mar Superstar). Dalley hopes to create visuals in the form of music videos for songs in Peninsula, something that he has never done in his prior musical ventures.

=== Other work ===
Dalley formed Intramural and released This is a Landslide on October 23, 2008, via Slowdance Records. He has also recorded music with Leta Lucy from The Twilight Singers as part of a project called Two of Cups, which is currently unsigned.

Dalley performs and collaborates frequently with Sean Tillman (a.k.a. Har Mar Superstar) and has appeared on Late Night with Jimmy Fallon and Lopez Tonight, playing both guitar and bass guitar in Tillman's multiple projects. Dalley also toured as an instrumentalist with The Pink Spiders in the fall of 2008 and The Watson Twins in early 2009.

Dalley has licensed his music to such shows as Ugly Betty and ER, written music for several national and international commercials, and scored a feature-length documentary called America's Marine Aviators.

== Discography ==
=== With Desaparecidos ===
==== Studio albums ====
- Read Music/Speak Spanish (2002 · Saddle Creek Records)
- Payola (2015 – Epitaph Records)

==== Singles ====
- What's New For Fall (2001 · Wichita Recordings)
- The Happiest Place on Earth (2001 · Saddle Creek Records)

=== As statistics ===
- Statistics EP (2003 · Jade Tree Records)
- Leave Your Name (2004 · Jade Tree Records)
- Often Lie (2005 · Jade Tree Records)
- Peninsula (2013 · Afternoon Records)

=== As Intramural ===
- This Is a Landslide (2007 · Slowdance Records)
