= The So So Glos =

American punk rock band

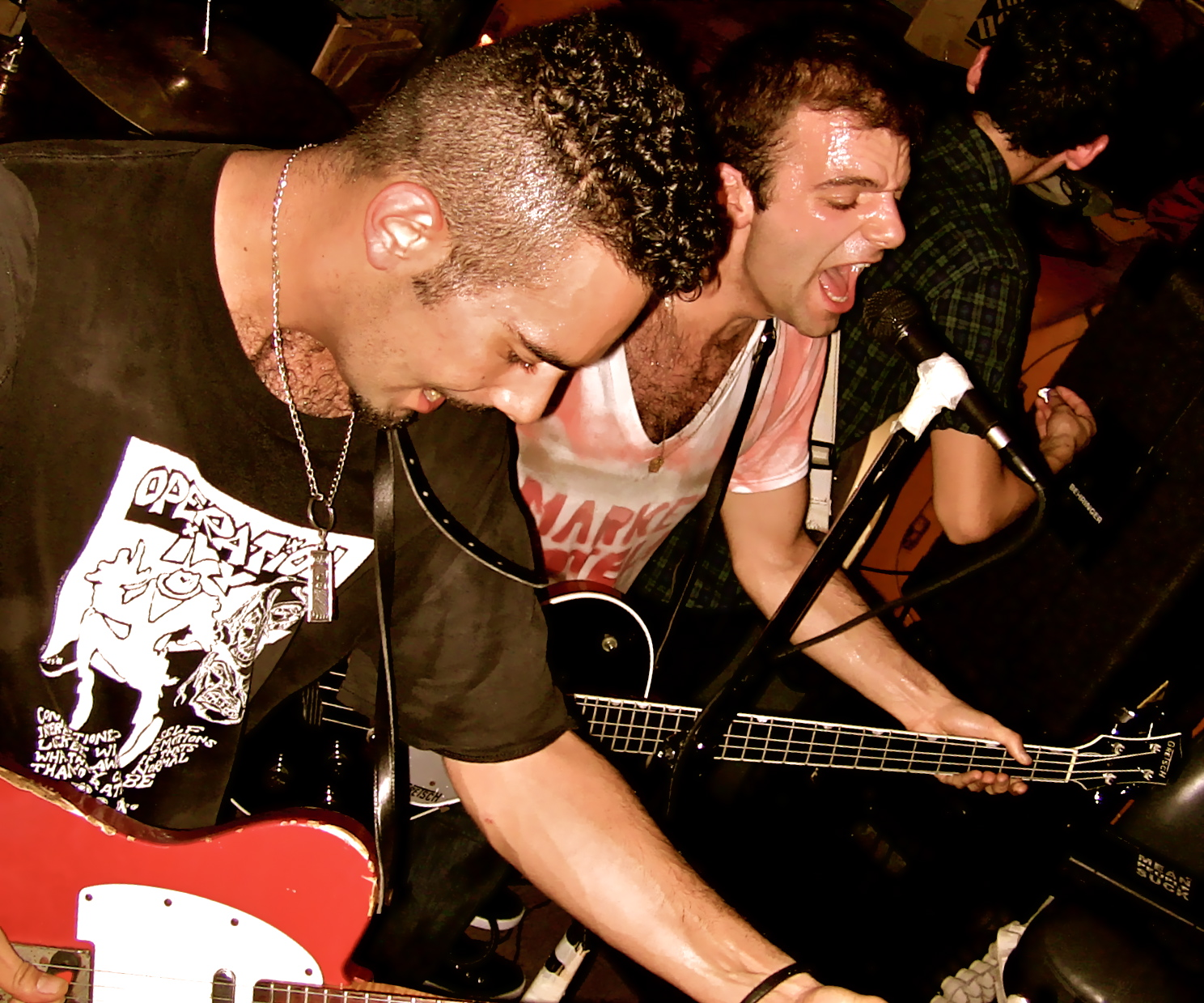
- Performing at a punk space in Portland, Oregon (2010)

Background information
- Origin: Bay Ridge, Brooklyn
- Genres: Punk rock, indie rock
- Years active: 2007–present
- Labels: Votiv Music, Green Owl Records, Shea Stadium Records
- Members: Alex Levine; Ryan Levine; Zach Staggers; Matt Elkin; Adam Reich

The So So Glos are a punk rock band formed in 2007 in Brooklyn, New York. The band consists of Alex Levine aka Alex Orange Drink (vocals, bass), Ryan Levine (guitar, vocals), Matt Elkin (guitar, vocals) and Zach Staggers (drums, vocals). They have toured the U.S. and Europe extensively and have supported a wide range of acts (seen most touring with The Front Bottoms). They are also recognized for their active participation in the all-ages music venues of New York City and the DIY movement in general.

== History ==
Brothers Alex and Ryan Levine are originally from Bay Ridge, Brooklyn, as well as Zach Staggers whom Ryan met in pre-school. Through divorces and remarriages, Zach became their step-brother and they began playing music at a very early age. Singer/bassist Alex Levine was born with the rare metabolic disorder homocystinuria and lacks the proper enzyme to digest protein, which has affected his dietary habits nearly his entire life. Over the course of their childhood, the three brothers moved around the New York metropolitan area quite frequently always playing music together under different monikers.

They adopted their current name in 2007 and self-released their eponymous debut that same year. The album was recorded in a series of after-hour sessions at a Staten Island studio with childhood friend and producer Adam Reich. Guitarist Matt Elkin joined the band in October 2007 shortly before their first cross-country tour. Upon returning to New York, they co-founded an all-ages venue in Brooklyn named The Market Hotel with DIY show promoter Todd P. The band helped construct The Market Hotel in spring 2008 and formerly resided there in between touring.

The So So Glos released their Tourism/Terrorism LP in fall 2008 through Warner subsidiary Green Owl Records. The album received an A− from Robert Christgau and won the "Best Punk Album" category of the 9th Annual Independent Music Awards. After several D.I.Y. tours of the U.S. in support of the album, the band toured Europe as an opening act for ...And You Will Know Us by the Trail of Dead.

During the summer of 2009, along with producer Adam Reich, the band established an all-ages performance space/recording studio in Brooklyn called Shea Stadium.

Their 7-inch EP Low Back Chain Shift was released in fall 2010, and they promoted it on the road in North America with Matt & Kim and the Futureheads.

The band's second full-length studio album, Blowout, was released independently on April 23, 2013 via their own Shea Stadium Records. Their most acclaimed release yet, Blowout received inclusions on the Top 50 Albums of 2013 lists for Rolling Stone and Consequence of Sound. The band toured in support of the album over the subsequent year with Titus Andronicus, Desaparecidos, Diarrhea Planet, and Say Anything. They opened for Stiff Little Fingers and The Hold Steady on their U.K. & European tour in October 2016.

The So So Glos released their latest and fourth full-length studio album Kamikaze on May 20, 2016. The album was recorded by John Reis (Hot Snakes, Drive Like Jehu) and released by their record label, Shea Stadium Records, and Votiv, and was met with a positive reception from critics. In December, 2022 the So So Glos released "This Could Be Christmas" which features Spider Stacy of The Pogues.

== Discography ==
- The So So Glos (2007)
- Tourism/Terrorism (2008)
- Low Back Chain Shift (EP) (2010)
- Blowout (2013)
- Kamikaze (2016)
