= Tommy Ill =

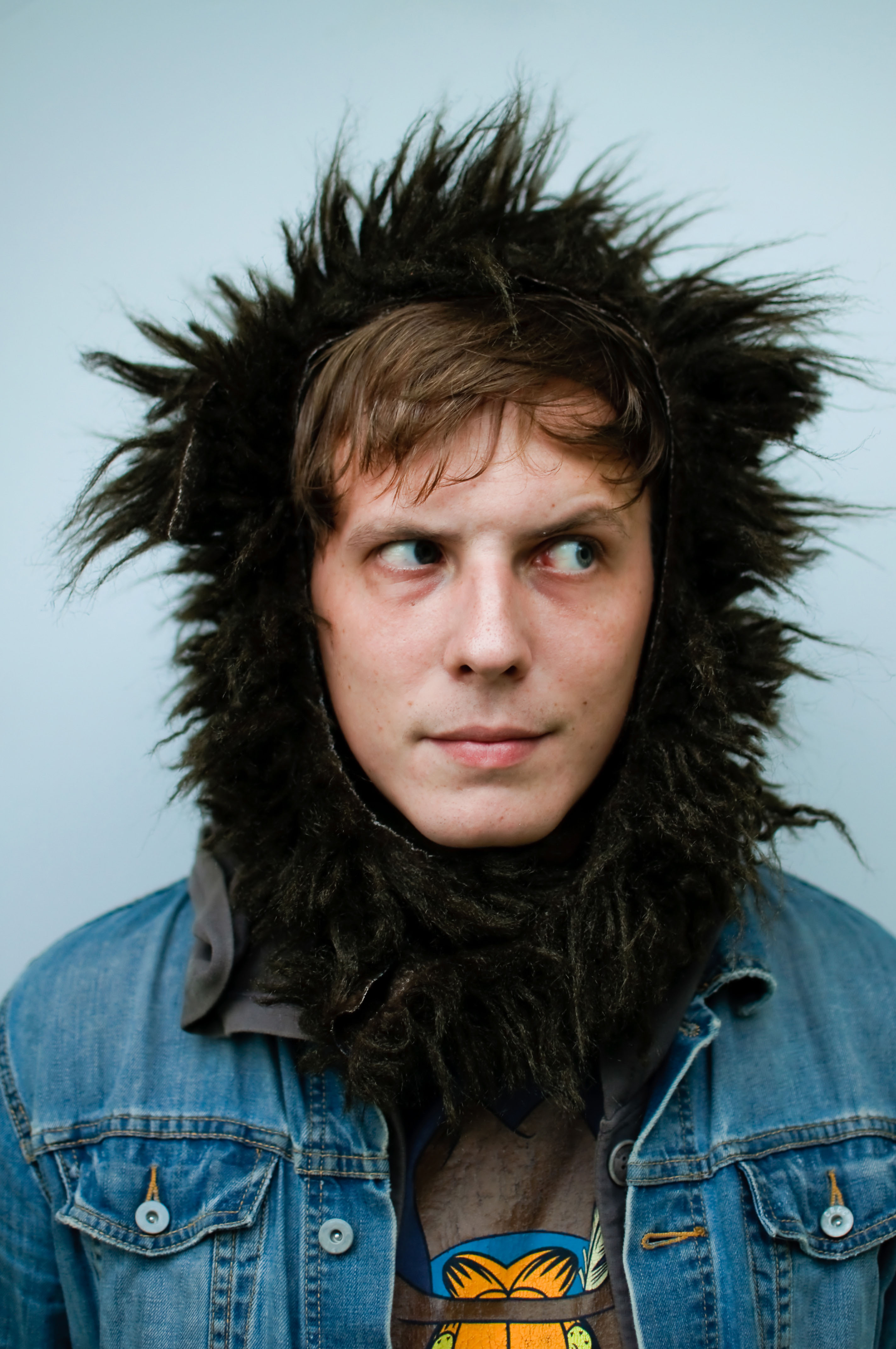

Background information
- Origin: Wellington, New Zealand
- Genres: Hip Hop, Indie
- Members: Tom Young; Buck Beauchamp; Kelvin Neal; Brian Hainsworth; James Beavis
- Website: tommyill.com

Tommy Ill is a Wellington, New Zealand based rapper. Tommy Ill is one man, Tom Young, though the live band has a revolving cast of members: Kelvin Neal, Buck Beauchamp, James Beavis and Brian Hainsworth. Tommy's music has a reputation for being quirky, witty and eclectic. Though Tommy Ill songs involve rapping, and hip-hop style beats and samples, he is more often seen playing with indie/electro acts than with hip-hop acts.

== Studio albums ==
Year	Title
2013	Fearless Bueller: Released: 6 May 2013; Label: Bandcamp; Format: Digital
2012	New Hat and a Haircut: Released: 2 April 2012; Label: EMI; Format: CD and Digital
2010	Tommy Ill: Released: 23 August 2010; Label: Loop Recordings/Border; Format: CD and Digital

== Extended plays ==
Year	Title
2006	Toast and Tea Kettles: Released: 7 December 2006; Label: Empathy Recordings; Format: CD and Digital
2008	Matchsticks: Released: 4 October 2008; Label: Loop Recordings/Border; Format: CD and Digital
2009	Come Home Mr. Ill: Released: 17 November 2009; Label: Loop Recordings/Border; Format: CD and Digital
