= Cassette (New Zealand band) =

New Zealand alt country/indie rock band

Cassette are an alt country/indie rock band from Wellington, New Zealand. They were formed in summer 1999–2000, and originally consisted of Tom Watson (guitar, vocals), Craig Terris (drums, vocals) and David Fraser (bass, keys and vocals). The band was joined by Paul Trigg (guitar) (formerly of Letterbox Lambs), after their move to Melbourne in 2001. Fraser left in 2004 to move to London (making the band a three piece again), and Paul Trigg moved to bass guitar. Cassette have released an EP ("Emo in NZ" in 2001, also known as the "Nothing to Do" EP in Australia (2003)) and "Cut for Summer" in 2006 (in NZ only).

Cassette's second album, The Jingle King, was released in 2009.
