= The Show Is the Rainbow =

American music act

The Show is the Rainbow
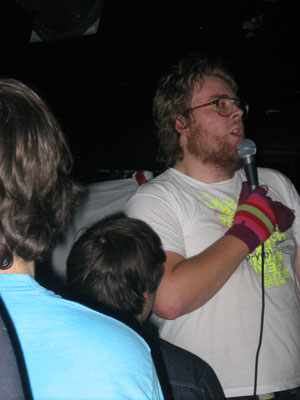

Background information
- Origin: Lincoln, Nebraska, United States
- Genres: Indie rock, electronic rock, electronica, hip hop, indietronica, rap rock, lo-fi, Laptop rock
- Years active: 2003 – present
- Labels: Tsk Tsk Records; SAF Records; It Are Good Records; Retard Disco; Illegal Art
- Members: Darren Keen

The Show is the Rainbow is an American music act from Lincoln, Nebraska, United States, aka Darren Keen. For much of 2006, The Show is the Rainbow toured as a three-piece, with Javid Dabestani and Jim Schroeder playing alongside Keen. Currently, Keen is touring as a one-man band. The Show is the Rainbow plays an eclectic mix of rock, electronica and hip-hop inspired by artists such as The Faint, Frank Zappa, Nina Hagen, Les Savy Fav, Squarepusher and Beck. The Show is the Rainbow has gained a national following by means of near constant touring and energetic live shows that focus on audience interaction.

Darren Keen has gained notoriety for his commentary on indie fashion and scene icons such as Conor Oberst and Saddle Creek. This is most notable in the song "Up a Creek without a Saddle." Darren Keen also produced his own version of the fake interview from Bright Eyes' own Fevers and Mirrors, where he discusses cocaine, trite symbolism and indie scene stereotypes. This was in response to being "called out" in a hidden track that appears on Criteria's En Garde.

== Band members ==
- Darren Keen

== Discography ==
=== Albums ===
- Radboyz Only!!! (2005 · Tsk Tsk Records)
1. "Barking Up the Wrong Tree"
2. "Keepers of the Sand"
3. "Up the Creek Without a Saddle"
4. "The Creepiest Creep in All the Land"
5. "Medicillin"
6. "The Creep Returns Home"
7. "Jailbait Babycake"
8. "The New Deal"
9. "Babe Born in Blue Skies"
- Gymnasia (2007 · SAF Records)
1. "Gothic Cajun"
2. "You are the Bloodgnome"
3. "Three"
4. "I am the Decline"
5. "Do the Skinny"
6. "All's Well blah blah blah"
7. "Safe Art"
8. "Waiting not Working pt. 1"
9. "Waiting not Working pt. 2"
10. "Waiting not Working pt. 3"
11. "Swatting Flies"
12. "Gymnasia"
- Wet Fist (2009 · Retard Disco (CD)/SAF Records (LP))
1. "Made of Cardboard"
2. "First Little Whisper"
3. "Roar Means Run"
4. "Who He Says He Is"
5. "Wordless Whisper"
6. "Sperm and Egg"
7. "Mother and Son"
8. "Run Fast At the End"
9. "Come Dry Your Flower"
10. "They Won't"
11. "A Bloomed Loop"
12. "Life Is Good"
13. "Whisper At Once"
- Tickled Pink (2011 · It Are Good)
1. "Return To The Microthrone"
2. "Banjo Solo"
3. "Know All About It"
4. "Pay The Cover"
5. "VAC VIB"
6. "Don't Vote"
7. "Brain"
8. "Brian"
9. "Support The Artists"
10. "There's Always More Then There Was Before"

=== Singles and EPs ===
- "Barry Sure Wrote a Lot of Songs About the Girls He's Loved" (2003 · Suckapunch Records)
- "Correcting Dog Behavior Problems Using Dog Radartron" (2004 · Suckapunch Records)
- "Homosexual Mowhawk" (2005 · It Are Good Records)
- "The Perfect Push" / "Nametag" 7" (2007 · Yosada Records)

=== Splits ===
- The Show is the Rainbow/Troubled Hubble – Baila Con Mi Hija 7" (2003 · Sunday's Best Records)
