= Ian Jorgensen =

New Zealand promoter and photographer (born 1978)

Ian Francis Jorgensen, also known as Blink, is a New Zealand events manager, editor and photographer based in Wellington. He is the producer of the New Zealand music compilation and magazine series A Low Hum.

Blink was also the principal photographer for the book, NZ Rock: 1987–2007, written by Gareth Shute, published in 2008.

Since 2007 Ian has been running a music festival called Camp A Low Hum.

Despite overwhelmingly receptive responses to his monthly 2006 music tours around New Zealand, Jorgensen halted the monthly tours in 2007 to pursue new projects. These new projects include a music camp, a touring poster-art collection, the release of a New Zealand-orientated touring hand-book called Local Knowledge.

In mid 2012, Ian (as "Blink") wrote and published another touring hand-book, this time for bands traveling internationally called "D.I.Y Touring the World"

In October 2012, Ian opened a new music venue in Wellington called "Puppies".

In November 2013, Ian launches a new music festival, Square Wave Festival taking place throughout New Zealand.
