= Steve Pedersen =

American guitarist

Steve Pederson is an American guitarist from Omaha, Nebraska. He left Cursive in 1998 to attend law school at Duke University in North Carolina, after graduating from Creighton University with a degree in political science. At Duke, he started the band The White Octave, which released two albums and appeared on a few samplers. When Pedersen graduated, he returned to Omaha, Nebraska, started Criteria, and began working at Kutak Rock LLP.

With the help of some friends, he wrote ten songs in a friend's basement, where he also lived for a short while. Their debut album, En Garde was released on Initial Records. En Garde became a very underrated album, probably due to lack of promotion. Pedersen soon found a job and became a lawyer. Even with a new job, he still found time to play a few shows here and there.

After Initial Records disbanded, Criteria needed to find a new record label. Hometown friends Saddle Creek Records took them in and re-released En Garde in 2005, as well as a new album, When We Break. Since then, Pedersen has lived out his life with his wife and kids doing music on the side as a hobby.

== Album appearances ==
See also albums under Criteria, Cursive, Slowdown Virginia, and The White Octave.

=== With Cursive ===
- Such Blinding Stars for Starving Eyes (1997, Crank! Records)
- The Storms of Early Summer: Semantics of Song (1998, Saddle Creek)

=== With Criteria ===
- Criteria - En Garde (2003, Initial Records)
- Criteria - When We Break (2005, Saddle Creek)
- Criteria - Years (2020, 15 Passenger)
- Criteria - SEIZE! (2026, Spartan)

=== Other ===
- Bright Eyes/Britt Daniel - Home Volume IV (2002, Post-Parlo)
- Produced and sang on The Ice Storm, Big Gust, and You on Tilly and the Wall's Wild Like Children album, released in 2004 on Team Love. The album was recorded in his basement.
- Produced The Lovekill's These Moments Are Momentum album, released in 2006 on Eyeball Records. The album was recorded in his basement in Omaha, Nebraska, as well as Presto! Recording Studios in Lincoln, Nebraska.

== See also ==
- Criteria
- Cursive
- Slowdown Virginia
- Smashmouth (indie rock band)
- The White Octave
