= The '89 Cubs =

American indie rock band

- Origin: Omaha, Nebraska, United States
- Genres: Indie rock
- Years active: 2003–present
- Label: Slowdance Records
- Members: Ryan Fox; Dan Brennan; Matt Baum

The '89 Cubs are a power trio from Omaha, Nebraska. The band features members from Bright Eyes, Desaparecidos, and The Good Life, all bands that are signed to Saddle Creek Records. Their sole full-length album, There Are Giants in the Earth was released in November 2004.

== Band members ==
- Ryan Fox - guitar, vocals, keyboards, percussion, woodwinds, samples
- Dan Brennan - bass guitar, vocals, percussion, yelling, high five
- Matt Baum - drums, samples, yelling, high five

== Guest musicians ==
- A.J. Mogis - Mixing
- Greg Fox (guitarist) - guitar
- Terry Brennan- Guitar
- Kevin Ahern - Clapping, Stomping, Yells

== Discography ==
- There Are Giants in the Earth (2004 · Slowdance Records)
