= Rand & Holland =

Rand & Holland is the project for Sydney musician Brett Thompson.

In 2003 the group released its debut album, Tomorrow Will Be Like Today, on the Sydney-based label Preservation, and it has since been released in Germany on Staubgold.

In 2007, the band followed up this album with the release Caravans.
