= The Nein EP =

The Nein

EP by The Nein
- Released: October 19, 2004
- Recorded: 2004
- Genre: Indie pop, post-punk, art rock
- Length: 24:02
- Label: Sonic Unyon

The Nein EPs chronology
The Nein (2004)	Transitionalisms (2006)

The Nein is the eponymously titled debut EP by The Nein. It was released on October 19, 2004, on Sonic Unyon.

== Track listing ==
All songs written and composed by Casey Burns, Finn Cohen, and Robert Biggers.

1. "Five Extinctions" – 5:15
2. "Handout" – 3:50
3. "War Is on the Stereo" – 3:48
4. "House Atreides" – 3:20
5. "Giorgio" – 4:01
6. "Clearwater" – 3:48

== Personnel ==
The Nein

- Finn Cohen – Vocals, guitar
- Casey Burns – bass
- Robert Biggers – drum, keyboards
- Zeke Graves – Keyboards, tambourine

Production

- Jayce Murphy – Engineering, mixing
- Nick Peterson – Engineering
- John Byrd – Engineering
- John Golden – Mastering
- Finn Cohen – Programming
- Casey Burns – Cutting, graphic design
- Dale Flattum – Cover collage
- Polah Beah – Photography
- Meredith Hinshaw – Photography

== Sources ==
- The Nein at AllMusic
- The Nein at Discogs
- The Nein at Rate Your Music
- Sonic Unyon's website
