= The Nein =

American indie rock band

- Origin: Durham, North Carolina, USA
- Genres: Indie rock Post-punk; Art rock
- Years active: 2003–present
- Label: Sonic Unyon
- Members: Robert Biggers; Finn Cohen; Josh Carpenter; Dale Flatum
- Past members: Casey Burns

The Nein is an indie rock band from Durham, North Carolina, and is composed of former members of The White Octave, Steel Pole Bath Tub, and Piedmont Charisma. The band is signed to the Canadian label Sonic Unyon.

== Biography ==
Finn Cohen, Robert Biggers, and Casey Burns formed the group in early 2003 in Durham, North Carolina. After self-releasing a handful of EPs, the band signed to Sonic Unyon and released their self-titled debut EP. Dale Flattum joined the group in 2004 and the group released their full-length album, Wrath of Circuits in 2005 on Sonic Unyon (with a vinyl version release on Red Strings Records later that year). Burns left the group in early 2006, and the group began work on new material and future touring with Josh Carpenter (of Asheville, North Carolina). In September, 2006, Sonic Unyon released an EP of material previously recorded with Burns, entitled Transitionalisms, which preceded the release of their second full-length album Luxury.

== Discography ==
=== Studio albums ===
- Wrath of Circuits (CD/LP) - Sonic Unyon - May 17, 2005
- Luxury (CD/LP) - Sonic Unyon - February 20, 2007

=== EPs ===
- Demo (2003 · Self-Released)
- Twelve Thirteen Fourteen (2004 · Self-Released)
- The Nein EP (2004 · Sonic Unyon)
- Canadian Tour EP (2004 · Self-Released)
- Split 7" w/ Cantwell, Gomez & Jordan (2006 · Sit-n-Spin Records)
- Transitionalisms EP (2006 · Sonic Unyon)

=== Miscellaneous Releases ===
- We Get Lost (2013 · Semiotic Crouton Records)

== Previous and related groups and aliases ==
- Robert Biggers: The White Octave, Cold Sides, Erie Choir, Gold Chainz, Audubon Park
- Casey Burns: Soundtrack, Gold Chainz, Casey Burns (Illustrator)
- Josh Carpenter: Piedmont Charisma, The Makeout Room, On the Take
- Finn Cohen: Fura, The White Octave, Gold Chainz, Audubon Park, Sunshine Radio
- Dale Flattum: Steel Pole Bath Tub, Milk Cult, Agent Nova, Sunshine Radio, TOOTH
