= Casey Burns =

American graphic illustrator

- Born: Hendersonville, North Carolina, U.S.
- Education: University of North Carolina at Chapel Hill
- Known for: Graphic illustrator, member of The Nein and The Rosebuds
- Style: Pop art, screen printing, illustration, poster art
- Website: www.caseyburnscreative.com

Casey Burns is an American-born graphic illustrator, screen printer, rock poster artist, musician, and advertising art director. He was a founding member of The Nein, a member of LD Beghtol's LD&CO and was at one time a member of The Rosebuds.

== Early life ==
Burns was born in Hendersonville, North Carolina. In grammar school, he started replicating the logos of his favorite bands, including Van Halen and the Dead Kennedys. While he was in high school, he self-published zines and mini-comics.

He was a Morehead Scholar at the University of North Carolina where he received a degree in journalism. While a student at UNC, he became involved with the local music scene as both a musician and poster artist.

== Career ==
=== Graphic design ===
After he graduated from college, Burns became a full-time art director/graphic designer for Cat's Cradle in Chapel Hill, North Carolina. He designed advertisements, flyers, tickets, and the club's first website. He also screen printed posters for concerts for Joan Baez, Bettie Serveert, The Breeders, Richard Buckner, Built to Spill, Crooked Fingers, Dashboard Confessional, Gang of Four, Southern Culture on the Skids, Tift Merritt, Mogwai, Super Furry Animals, and Lucinda Williams. He worked for Cat's Cradle for ten years, through 2006.

His work was noticed by Paul Grushkin, who assembled the coffee table book The Art of Modern Rock which was published in 2004. This book and several others included Burns's work, bringing Burns to the attention of ad agencies. He did design projects for Nike, Deschutes Brewery, and Sonic Youth.

In 2012, Casey designed the artwork for the remastered edition of White Trash Heroes by Archers of Loaf. In 2021, he created the design for the launch of Patti Smith's online newsletter. Other clients include DC Comics, Doc Martens, Epic Records, Joan Jett, Marvel Comics, Merge Records, The New York Times, Simon & Schuster, and Van's Warped Tour.

=== Music ===
In 2003, Burns was a founding member and bassist of The Nein, an art-punk band based in Durham, North Carolina. The band toured constantly and self-released three EPs before signing with Sonic Unyon in 2005. Burns recorded Wrath of Circuits (2005) and Transitionalisms (2006) before leaving the band to move to Portland, Oregon.

In 2008, Burns joined The Rosebuds as touring bassist in support of the album Life Like. In 2011, he began playing bass with LD Beghtol (of the Magnetic Fields 69 Love Songs) in his new project LD&CO.

Burns has also played with Baby Your Baby, Gold Chainz, and Soundtrack.

== Exhibitions ==
In 1994, his posters and paintings were displayed at the Lollapalooza musical festival. Dr. Quang's Gallery in Chapel Hill hosted a solo show, Product: 23 Screenprints by Casey Burns in May and June 1998. He also had a solo show called Faces: Monotypes by Casey Burns at the Open Eye Cafe in Carrboro, North Carolina, December 2000 through January 2001. In September and October 2003, the Design Box in Raleigh, North Carolina held Stuck Up: The Poster art of Casey Burns, Dale Flattum, and Ron Liberti. His work was also included in the American Poster Institute's annual Flatstock in Austin 2003, Seattle 2004, and Seattle 2009. In 2011, Burns was included Goodfoot's The Art of Musical Maintenance, a multi-artist show in Portland.

The Southern Folklife Collection at the University of North Carolina at Chapel Hill houses a collection of screen-printed posters representing the early period of Burns's career. In 2008, UNC's Wilson Library hosted an exhibit of Burns's rock posters.

== Published works ==
Burns's work is featured in the following publications:

- Farren, Mick and Loren, Dennis. Classic Rock Posters. London: Omnibus Press, 2012. ISBN 978-1454911920
- Maiffredy, Didier. Rock Poster Art. Paris: Eyrolles, 2012. ISBN 978-2212134704
- Society of Illustrators. Illustrators 53. New York: Collins Design, 2011. ISBN 978-0062123367
- Communication Arts 2011 Illustration Annual. Mancino Park, California: Coyne & Blanchard, 2011.
- Foster, John. 1000 Indie Posters. New York: Rockport Publishers, 2011. ISBN 978-1592536566
- Gig Posters 2011 Calender. Germany: Heye, 2010. ISBN 978-3840104527
- Peveto, Geoff. Rock Paper Show: Flatstock Volume One. Brooklyn: Soundscreen Design, 2010. ISBN 978-0984302802
- Hayes, Clay. Gig Posters: Rock Show Art of the 21st Century. Philadelphia: Quirk Books, 2009. ISBN 978-1594743269
- Groenenboom, Roland. Sonic Youth: Sensational Fix. Cologne, Germany: Walther König, 2008. ISBN 9783865605399
- Grushkin, Paul. Rockin' Down the Highway: The Cars and People That Made Rock Roll. St. Paul, Minnesota: Voyageur Press, 2006. ISBN 978-0760322925
- Kozik, Frank. Panda Meat: Source Book One. San Francisco: Last Gasp, 2005. ISBN 978-0867196252
- Newton, Matthew. Young and Reckless: Poison Control Volume One. Pittsburgh, Pennsylvania: Poison Control, 2005.
- King, Paul and Dennis. The Art of Modern Rock. Grushkin. San Francisco: Chronicle Books, 2004. ISBN 978-0811845298
- Stromquist, Annie. Simple Screenprinting. New York: Lark Books, 2004. ISBN 978-1579906641

== Personal life ==
Burns stayed in Chapel Hill after graduating from UNC. In 2006, he moved to Portland, Oregon, remaining there for six years. He then moved to New York City.
