= Lady finger =

Lady finger(s), ladyfinger(s), lady's finger, or ladies' fingers may refer to:

== Food ==
- Ladyfinger (biscuit), a type of sponge cake
- Ladyfinger, a kirsch cocktail

== Botany ==
- Okra, or ladies' fingers, a pod vegetable plant
- Ladyfinger cactus, a common name for two species of cacti
- Lady Finger banana

== Arts and entertainment ==
- Ladyfingers (film), or Alias Ladyfingers, a 1921 film
- Ladyfingers, a 1920 novel by Jackson Gregory; basis for the film
- "Ladyfingers" (song), a 1999 song by Luscious Jackson
- "Ladyfingers", a 1965 song by Herb Alpert & the Tijuana Brass from Whipped Cream & Other Delights
- Lady Finger, a female counterpart to Thing in the TV series The Addams Family

== Other uses ==
- Ladyfinger Peak, a rock spire in Pakistan

== See also ==
- Ladyfinger (ne), an American rock band
