= Shepherd Head =

Studio album by Young Jesus
- Released: September 16, 2022
- Length: 27:48
- Label: Saddle Creek

Young Jesus chronology
| Welcome to Conceptual Beach (2020) | Shepherd Head (2022) |

Singles from Shepherd Head
- 1. "Ocean" Released: August 3, 2022

Professional ratings
Aggregate scores
| Source | Rating |
|---|---|
| Metacritic | 76/100 |
Review scores
| Source | Rating |
| Loud and Quiet | 7/10 |
| Paste | 7.7/10 |
| Pitchfork | 7.4/10 |
| Sputnikmusic | 3.7/5 |

Shepherd Head is the sixth studio album by American indie rock band Young Jesus. It was released on September 16, 2022, by Saddle Creek.

== Background ==
on August 3, 2022, Young Jesus announced they were releasing their fourth studio album, along with the single "Ocean", which features singer-songwriter Tomberlin. The single was also featured on Paste's Top 15 Songs of August 2022.

== Critical reception ==
Shepherd Head was met with "generally favorable" reviews from critics. At Metacritic, which assigns a weighted average rating out of 100 to reviews from mainstream publications, this release received an average score of 76, based on 4 reviews.

Pat King of Paste wrote: "The tranquil and atmospheric flow of the album is a perfect canvas for Rossiter, who tends to bellow more than sing. His rich and emotive voice can sound at times like that of a much more timid Jeff Buckley." At Sputnikmusic, the album was described as a "solid release" and a "different kind of Young Jesus record".

== Track listing ==
Shepherd Head track listing
| No. | Title | Length |
|---|---|---|
| 1. | "Rose Eater" | 4:25 |
| 2. | "Ocean" (featuring Tomberlin) | 4:41 |
| 3. | "Johno" | 3:05 |
| 4. | "Shepherd Head" | 2:36 |
| 5. | "Gold Line Awe" | 3:48 |
| 6. | "Satsuma" | 2:49 |
| 7. | "Believer" (featuring Arswain) | 3:16 |
| 8. | "A Lake" | 3:08 |
