= Kianna Alarid =

American singer

- Born: Omaha, Nebraska, U.S.
- Occupation: Musician

Kianna Marie Alarid is an American singer and bass-guitarist. She is the lead singer and co-writer of Yes You Are and singer and bass guitarist for the band Tilly and the Wall from Omaha, Nebraska. She was formerly in a band called Magic Kiss with members of Park Ave. and The Faint, and before that, a hardcore band called Project 356.

She performed vocals on the song, "The Absence of God" from More Adventurous with Rilo Kiley.

Kianna co-wrote and sings on Tiësto's song "You Are My Diamond" on his album Kaleidoscope released on October 6, 2009.

Kianna also sings on She & Him's 2010 song, "In the Sun" with fellow Tilly member, Neely Jenkins.

== Album appearances ==
- Son, Ambulance - Someone Else's Déjà Vu (2008, Saddle Creek Records)
- Tiësto - Kaleidoscope (2009, Ultra Records)
- She & Him - Volume Two (2010, Merge Records)
- Jenny Lewis - Acid Tongue (2009, Team Love Records)

== See also ==
- Derek Pressnall
- Jamie Pressnall
- Neely Jenkins
- Nick White
