= Polecat (band) =

American band

Polecat was an early band of singer-guitarist Ted Stevens of Omaha, Nebraska. He later went on to form Lullaby For The Working Class who recorded for Bar/None Records and Saddle Creek Records. He is currently a guitarist in Saddle Creek's Cursive and Mayday. Polecat's first Ghostmeat release was the song "1979" on the Apollo's Salvage compilation released in 1995. Later that year, Ghostmeat and Lumberjack Records (which later became Saddle Creek) collaborated to release a Sunbrain & Polecat split 7-inch.

The A-side single of Polecat's 2500 Ft of Our Love, "Saddle Creek," partially inspired the name of Omaha label Saddle Creek Records.

== Band members ==
- Oliver Blaha
- Boz Hicks
- Ted Stevens

== Discography ==
- Dilly Dally (1993, Lumberjack Records)
- "2500 ft. of our Love" ("Saddle Creek" b/w "Chinese Water Torture") (1994, Double Zero Records, -ismist Recordings)
- Polecat/Sunbrain split 7-inch (1995, Lumberjack Records/Ghostmeat Records)
- You Smell Like a Polecat Feat. (1999, Comp2 Records)
- "1979" on the compilation Apollo's Salvage (1995)

== See also ==
- Cursive
- Lullaby for the Working Class
- Mayday
