= Bigamy: More Songs from the Monogamy Sessions =

EP by Tim Kasher
- Released: August 16, 2011
- Studios: Sleepy House studio, Omaha, Nebraska; SnowGhost Music, Whitefish, Montana; various others.
- Genre: Indie rock
- Label: Saddle Creek Records

Tim Kasher chronology
| The Game of Monogamy (2010) | Bigamy: More Songs from the Monogamy Sessions (2011) | Adult Film (2013) |

Bigamy: More Songs from the Monogamy Session is a solo extended play album by Tim Kasher of the bands Cursive and The Good Life. The album was released on August 16, 2011, on Saddle Creek Records for download and physical copies were sold on tour only. Tracks from the album were written during the same period as Kasher's debut solo album, The Game of Monogamy, released on Saddle Creek in 2010. Songs from Bigamy were recorded after the ones from Monogamy, with the exception of "A Bluer Sea", which was recorded as a song for Monogamy. The EP also has a cover of "Trees Keep Growing" by Saddle Creek label mate Azure Ray from their second album, Burn and Shiver.

== Critical reception ==
Nick Freed of Consequence of Sound gave Bigamy a C− rating, observing that the album "might take a few listens to wrap around, but the payoff is definitely worth it" but noting that it was "refreshing to watch an artist not just stick to his usual ideas, both musically and lyrically, and allow himself to grow up." Alternative Press's Chris Parker called Kasher's writing on the album "heartbreak porn," finding strength in the writing and saying that "[the songs] hardly seem like throwaways and would have easily fit on [The Game of Monogamy]".

== Track listing ==
| No. | Title | Length |
|---|---|---|
| 1. | "No Harmony" | 5:10 |
| 2. | "Opening Night" | 4:01 |
| 3. | "A Bluer Sea" | 3:58 |
| 4. | "Lilybird and the Trust Fund Kid" | 4:11 |
| 5. | "Rabbit, Run" | 4:03 |
| 6. | "The Jessica" | 2:49 |
| 7. | "Trees Keep Growing" | 3:17 |
| Total length: | | 22:29 |
