= Old Blood =

Studio album by Mayday
- Released: May 14, 2002
- Recorded: November 2001
- Genre: Indie rock
- Label: Saddle Creek

Mayday chronology
Old Blood (2002)	I Know Your Troubles Been Long (2003)

Professional ratings
Review scores
Source	Rating
AllMusic	4/5 stars
Pitchfork	8.2/10
Clamor	
SLUG Magazine	

Old Blood is an album by Mayday, released May 14, 2002. The album was recorded in May and November 2001 at Presto! Recording Studios in Lincoln, Nebraska. Mayday features the vocals and compositions of Lullaby for the Working Class frontman Ted Stevens. Ted is joined by the remaining Lullaby members, including Mike and A.J. Mogis, whose talents extend from behind the mixing console as players on the recording.

The instrumentation of Old Blood is referential to the Lullaby staples of guitar, vibraphone, strings, and banjo, extending the formula with piano, organ, tympani, and loads of guest vocals. The resulting sound is both raw and ornate. Revisited themes of spring, rebirth, solidarity, florescence, and distress establish a unity of imagery amidst sporadic changes in song dynamic. The songs were selected from a long and arbitrary collection of demos that have been in the works for years. The name "Mayday" is significant in that Stevens and friends have held a small concert billed as Mayday each May 1 for the last six years.

Stevens has spent the last couple of years playing in Cursive, as well as backing up Bright Eyes, Dave Dondero, Azure Ray, Simon Joyner, and The Good Life. As Lullaby, Ted, Tiffany, Mike and A.J. released three albums on Bar/None Records and a host of vinyl releases for Saddle Creek.

== Track listing ==
1. "Cinquefoils"
2. "Come Home"
3. "Captain"
4. "Tone/Atone/Atonal"
5. "Lullaby For The Sleeping Elephant"
6. "I Know Moonlight"
7. "Confession"
8. "Pilot"
9. "Temple/Temporary/Extempore/Tempo"
