= I Don't Know Who Needs to Hear This... =

Studio album by Tomberlin
- Released: April 29, 2022
- Studios: Figure 8 Recording (Brooklyn, New York)
- Length: 50:01
- Label: Saddle Creek
- Producers: Sarah Beth Tomberlin; Philip Weinrobe

Tomberlin chronology
Projections (2020)	I Don't Know Who Needs to Hear This... (2022)

Singles from I Don't Know Who Needs to Hear This...
- 1. "IDKWNTHT" Released: 25 January 2022; 2. "Happy Accident" Released: 16 February 2022; 3. "Tap" Released: 9 March 2022; 4. "Sunstruck" Released: 14 April 2022

I Don't Know Who Needs to Hear This... (stylized in all lowercase) is the second studio album by American singer-songwriter Tomberlin, released on April 29, 2022 by Saddle Creek Records. It was recorded at Figure 8 Recording in Brooklyn, New York.

The album's first single, "IDKWNTHT," which stands for "I Don't Know Who Needs to Hear This," was released on January 25, 2022. It features guest vocals from Felix Walworth. On February 16, 2022, the album was announced, along with the release of the second single, "Happy Accident," which features Cass McCombs on guitar. The third single, "Tap," was released on March 9, 2022, and the fourth single, "Sunstruck," was released on April 14, 2022.

The album was met with critical acclaim upon its release.

Professional ratings
Aggregate scores
Source	Rating
Metacritic	85/100
Review scores
Source	Rating
AllMusic	4.5/5 stars
Pitchfork	7.8/10
Exclaim!	9/10
Paste	8.4/10
PopMatters	7/10
Under the Radar	6.5/10
The Skinny	5/5 stars

== Track listing ==
All tracks are written by Tomberlin.

No.	Title	Length
1.	"Easy"	5:41
2.	"Born Again Runner"	5:18
3.	"Tap"	4:31
4.	"Memory"	4:32
5.	"Unsaid"	4:46
6.	"Sunstruck"	5:01
7.	"Collect Caller"	3:01
8.	"Stoned"	4:45
9.	"Happy Accident"	5:45
10.	"Possessed"	1:51
11.	"idkwntht"	4:45
Total length:		50:01

== Personnel ==
=== Musicians ===
- Sarah Beth Tomberlin - vocals, acoustic guitar
- Felix Walworth – bass, guitar, piano, drums, vocals
- Philip Weinrobe – bass, guitar, synths, piano
- David Cieri – piano
- Shahzad Ismaily – moog rogue, bass, guitar, percussion
- Stuart Bogie – woodwinds
- Doug Wieselman – woodwinds
- Aaron Roche – guitar, vocals
- Cass McCombs – guitar
- Jonnie Baker – moog, guitar
- Kenny Wollesen – percussion
- John Rossiter – guitar
- Jack McLoughlin – pedal steel
- Gyða Valtýsdóttir – cello

=== Technical ===
- Sarah Beth Tomberlin – production
- Philip Weinrobe – production, mixer, recording engineer
- Josh Bonati – mastering engineer
