= One Hand on the Steering Wheel the Other Sewing a Garden =

Studio album by Ada Lea
- Released: September 24, 2021
- Genre: Alternative rock
- Length: 40:11
- Label: Saddle Creek
- Producers: Ada Lea; Marshall Vore

Ada Lea chronology
What We Say in Private (2019)	One Hand on the Steering Wheel the Other Sewing a Garden (2021)	When I Paint My Masterpiece (2025)

One Hand on the Steering Wheel the Other Sewing a Garden is the second full-length studio album by Canadian singer-songwriter Ada Lea. It was released on September 24, 2021, through Saddle Creek Records. Production was handled by Lea together with Marshall Vore. The album debuted at number 23 on the Official Record Store Chart and number 19 on the Official Independent Album Breakers Chart in the UK, and was longlisted for the 2022 Polaris Music Prize.

== Critical reception ==
Professional ratings
Aggregate scores
Source	Rating
AnyDecentMusic?	7.2/10
Metacritic	75/100
Review scores
Source	Rating
AllMusic	4/5 stars
Beats Per Minute	73/100%
Distorted Sound	7/10
Exclaim!	8/10
Flood Magazine	8/10
Mojo	3/5 stars
Pitchfork	7.1/10
The Skinny	4/5 stars
Uncut	7/10
Under the Radar	7.5/10 stars

One Hand on the Steering Wheel the Other Sewing a Garden was met with generally favorable reviews from music critics. At Metacritic, which assigns a normalized rating out of 100 to reviews from mainstream publications, the album received an average score of 75 based on eight reviews. The aggregator AnyDecentMusic? has the critical consensus of the album at a 7.2 out of 10, based on nine reviews.

== Track listing ==
All tracks are written by Alexandra Levy.

No.	Title	Length
1.	"Damn"	4:21
2.	"Can't Stop Me From Dying"	3:09
3.	"Oranges"	4:54
4.	"Partner"	3:45
5.	"Saltspring"	4:23
6.	"And My Newness Spoke to Your Newness and It Was a Thing of Endless"	0:56
7.	"My Love 4 U Is Real"	4:31
8.	"Backyard"	2:56
9.	"Writer in NY"	3:19
10.	"Violence"	4:26
11.	"Hurt"	3:31
Total length:		40:11

== Personnel ==
- Alexandra "Ada Lea" Levy — lyrics, vocals, producer, engineering (tracks: 5, 6, 8), additional recording (tracks: 1–3, 9, 10), mixing (track 6), art direction
- Marshall Vore — producer & engineering (tracks: 1–4, 7, 9–11)
- Daniel Gélinas — engineering (tracks: 5, 8)
- Sam Gleason — additional recording (tracks: 1, 3, 7–9, 11)
- Steve Newton — additional recording (tracks: 1, 3, 5, 8, 11)
- Burke Reid — mixing (tracks: 1–5, 7–11)
- Heba Kadry — mastering
- Monse Muro — art direction, photography
- Catherine Pelletie — art direction, graphic design
- Alice Cloutier — photography assistant
