= What We Say in Private =

Studio album by Ada Lea
- Released: July 19, 2019
- Genre: Indie rock
- Length: 37:52
- Label: Saddle Creek
- Producer: Ada Lea; Tim Gowdy

Ada Lea chronology
What We Say in Private (2019)	One Hand on the Steering Wheel the Other Sewing a Garden (2021)

What We Say in Private is the debut full-length studio album by Canadian singer-songwriter Ada Lea. It was released on July 19, 2019, through Saddle Creek Records. Production was handled by Lea together with Tim Gowdy.

== Critical reception ==
Professional ratings
Aggregate scores
Source	Rating
AnyDecentMusic?	7.6/10
Metacritic	82/100
Review scores
Source	Rating
Clash	7/10
Exclaim!	8/10
God Is in the TV	8/10
Loud and Quiet	7/10
Paste	6.8/10
Pitchfork	7.3/10
The Irish Times	3/5 stars
The Line of Best Fit	9/10
The Skinny	5/5 stars
Under the Radar	6.5/10 stars

What We Say in Private was met with universal acclaim from music critics. At Metacritic, which assigns a normalized rating out of 100 to reviews from mainstream publications, the album received an average score of 82 based on ten reviews. The aggregator AnyDecentMusic? has the critical consensus of the album at a 7.6 out of 10, based on fifteen reviews.

Bethany Davison of The Skinny praised the album with perfect five-out-of-five stars rating, stating: "by welcoming the world into her record, Alexandra Levy has created something much more whole and warm than perhaps it might have been". Steven Loftin of The Line of Best Fit declared: "not a single moment is out of place. Everything is crafted to induce a reaction. ... Ada Lea has a musical mind that pushes so much further than just some melodies and words". Laura Stanley of Exclaim! noted: "Ada Lea's workmanship is striking on what we say in private, as she delicately showcases both the chaos and beauty of change". Trev Elkin of God Is in the TV called it "a remarkably engaging debut, one that keeps giving up its secrets on every listen". Margaret Farrell of Pitchfork wrote: "Ada Lea vacillates between timidity and aggression, are what make what we say in private so exciting. But it's Levy's willingness to wrestle with her own vulnerability that leads the album to its highest peaks". Erin Bashford of Clash resumed: "each song presents itself as a story-in-miniature; a perfectly crafted beginning, middle, end (albeit sometimes the artistry of the track makes the listening experience more middle, end, beginning)". Susan Darlington of Loud and Quiet determined: "initially conceived as a concept record of two distinct sides, itis also infused with breezy colour". Eric R. Danton of Paste wrote: "songs like '180 Days' and 'The Party' are stand-outs, but some of the other tracks can blend together unobtrusively enough that they go scrolling by without commanding your full attention, not memorable enough to make a lasting impact. That could be a testament to their subtlety, though it's more likely a sign of an artist with vast potential who is still growing into her talent". Stephen Mayne of Under the Radar stated: "songs rise and sink, her guitar sounds clearly, volume changes, uncertainty reigns, transcended by moments of beauty that disintegrate on contact with brutal lyrics drawn from a journal Levy poured her feelings into". Zara Hedderman of The Irish Times concluded: "on this charming debut, Ada Lea embraces past sadness through a knowing smile, assured that everything will be all right".

== Track listing ==
All tracks are written by Alexandra Levy.

No.	Title	Producer(s)	Length
1.	"Mercury"	Ada Lea; Tim Gowdy	4:41
2.	"Wild Heart"	Ada Lea; Tim Gowdy	3:58
3.	"The Party"	Ada Lea; Tim Gowdy	2:55
4.	"For Real Now (Not Pretend)"	Ada Lea; Tim Gowdy	4:34
5.	"Just One, Please"	Ada Lea	1:52
6.	"What Makes Me Sad"	Ada Lea; Tim Gowdy	3:22
7.	"The Dancer"	Ada Lea; Tim Gowdy	5:08
8.	"Yanking the Pearls Off Around My Neck…"	Ada Lea	3:29
9.	"180 Days"	Ada Lea; Tim Gowdy	3:50
10.	"Easy"	Ada Lea; Tim Gowdy	4:03
Total length:			37:52

== Personnel ==
- Alexandra "Ada Lea" Levy — lyrics, producer, recording (track 5)
- Tim Gowdy — producer & recording (tracks: 1–4, 6, 7, 9, 10)
- Harris Gilbertshper — recording (track 8)
- Heba Kadry — mastering
- Monse Muro — photography
- Catherine Pelletier — design
