= Fulfilled/complete =

fulfilled/complete

Studio album by Broken Spindles
- Released: May 4, 2004
- Recorded: December 2003–January 2004
- Studio: Presto! Recording Studios - Lincoln, Nebraska
- Genre: Indie rock
- Length: 32:36
- Label: Saddle Creek LBJ-61
- Producer: Mike Mogis

Broken Spindles chronology
| Broken Spindles (2002) | fulfilled/complete (2004) | inside/absent (2005) |

Professional ratings
Aggregate scores
| Source | Rating |
|---|---|
| Metacritic | 66/100 link |
Review scores
| Source | Rating |
| Allmusic | link |
| Pitchfork Media | (6.9/10) link |
| Punknews.org | 3.5/5 stars |

fulfilled/complete is the second release by American band Broken Spindles. It was released on Saddle Creek Records. It was released on May 4, 2004.

== Track listing ==
| No. | Title | Length |
|---|---|---|
| 1. | "Induction" | 4:04 |
| 2. | "Fall In and Down On" | 3:09 |
| 3. | "Song No Song" | 2:54 |
| 4. | "To Die, For Death" | 2:40 |
| 5. | "Move Away" | 3:34 |
| 6. | "Practice, Practice, Preach" | 1:56 |
| 7. | "Italian Wardrobe" | 4:49 |
| 8. | "Events & Affairs" | 2:22 |
| 9. | "Harm" | 3:09 |
| 10. | "The Dream" | 3:53 |

== Credits ==
- string arrangements for tracks 1, 2, 6, & 10 by Nate Walcott
  - Tracy Sands - cello
  - Cindy Ricker - viola
  - Donna Carnes - violin
  - Kim Salistean - violin
- piano on tracks 3, 6, and 10 played by Nate Walcott
- additional vocals on track 5 and 10 by Geraldine Vo
