= We'll Always Have Paris =

We'll Always Have Paris may refer to:

- "We'll always have Paris", a line in the film Casablanca
- "We'll Always Have Paris" (Pan Am), a 2011 television episode
- "We'll Always Have Paris" (Star Trek: The Next Generation), a 1988 television episode
- I'll Always Have Paris: A Memoir, by Art Buchwald (1995)
- "We'll Always Have Paris", a 1996 song by the Cherry Poppin' Daddies off the album Kids on the Street
- "We'll Always Have Paris", a 1997 song by the Commander Venus band from the album The Uneventful Vacation
- We'll Always Have Paris: Sex and Love in the City of Light, a 2006 nonfiction book by John Baxter
- We'll Always Have Paris: Stories, a 2009 book by Ray Bradbury
- "We'll Always Have Paris (Every Day All of the Time)", a song by Fastball, from the 2009 album Little White Lies
- "We'll Always Have Paris", a 2018 episode of The Bold Type
