= When I Paint My Masterpiece (album) =

Studio album by Ada Lea
- Released: August 8, 2025
- Genre: Indie folk; indie rock
- Length: 48:28
- Label: Saddle Creek
- Producer: Ada Lea; Luke Temple

Ada Lea chronology
One Hand on the Steering Wheel the Other Sewing a Garden (2021)	When I Paint My Masterpiece (2025)

Singles from When I Paint My Masterpiece
- 1. "Baby Blue Frigidaire Mini Fridge" Released: May 13, 2025; 2. "Something in the Wind" Released: June 24, 2025; 3. "Midnight Magic" Released: July 23, 2025; 4. "Bob Dylan's 115th Haircut" Released: August 5, 2025

When I Paint My Masterpiece is the third studio album by the Canadian singer-songwriter Ada Lea. It was released on August 8, 2025, via Saddle Creek in LP, CD and digital formats.

== Background ==
The album, preceded by Lea's 2021 second release, One Hand on the Steering Wheel the Other Sewing a Garden, was recorded in an Ontario house by Levy and her band composing guitarist Chris Hauer, bassist Summer Kodama, and drummer Tasy Hudson. It was co-produced with Luke Temple. Levy hosted a preview event in Montreal on August 8, prior to the album release.

"Baby Blue Frigidaire Mini Fridge" was released as the lead single of the album on May 13, 2025. The second single, "Something in the Wind", was released on June 24, 2025, followed by the third single, "Midnight Magic", on July 23, 2025. The fourth and final single, "Bob Dylan's 115th Haircut", was released on August 5, 2025.

== Reception ==
Professional ratings
Review scores
Source	Rating
AllMusic	3.5/5 stars
The Line of Best Fit	8/10
Pitchfork	7.3/10

Marcy Donelson of AllMusic noted, "In tune with the resulting living-and-breathing quality of the album, it's also a more acoustic-leaning one with an indie folk-rock feel – even opening with a fingerstyle guitar instrumental – although there are plenty of exceptions and surprises." The Line of Best Fit rated the album eight out of ten and described it as "an intimate record full of poetic and melodic turns, giving you the impression that sometimes Levy herself is surprised by where it takes her."

When I Paint My Masterpiece received a rating of 7.3 from Pitchfork, which remarked, "The new album feels lighter on its feet; many songs seem to float by, light sketches undergirded by minimal instrumentation."

Exclaim! noted it as "a vibrant, revelatory dispatch from the minutiae of Leonard Cohen — the cracks in the quotidian where we sometimes forget to see the light peeking through."

== Track listing ==
All tracks are written by Alexandra Levy; "Just Like in the Museum" written with Thomas Molander; "I Want It All" written with Dylan Obront.

When I Paint My Masterpiece track listing
No.	Title	Length
1.	"Death Phase of 2024 (Rainlight)"	0:49
2.	"Moon Blossom"	1:42
3.	"Baby Blue Frigidaire Mini Fridge"	3:39
4.	"Something in the Wind"	2:35
5.	"Midnight Magic"	3:17
6.	"It Isn't Enough"	1:56
7.	"Snowglobe"	3:11
8.	"Everything Under the Sun"	2:42
9.	"Just Like in the Museum"	3:55
10.	"Bob Dylan's 115th Haircut"	2:13
11.	"Diner"	3:45
12.	"There Is Only One Thing on My Mind"	4:00
13.	"Dogs Playing in the Backyard"	3:12
14.	"Down Under the Van Horne Overpass"	4:03
15.	"I Want It All"	3:36
16.	"Somebody Is Walking in the Water"	3:56
Total length:		48:28

== Personnel ==
Credits adapted from Tidal.

- Alexandra Levy – lead vocals, production (all tracks); engineering (tracks 1–5, 7–12, 14, 16), acoustic guitar (1, 2, 6–14, 16), mixing (1, 2), nylon-string guitar (4, 14), electric guitar (4), piano (5, 9, 13–15); keyboards, Rhodes piano (5); upright bass (6, 13); bass guitar, prepared piano (10); Omnichord (11)
- Heba Kadry – mastering
- Luke Temple – production (3–5, 7–12, 14, 16), synthesizer (3, 5, 11, 12, 16), 12-string guitar (3, 11), electric guitar (3), bass guitar (4, 8, 9), piano (4, 10, 14), keyboards (4), acoustic guitar (5, 7, 10, 11, 14, 16), 12-string electric guitar (8, 12, 16), vocals (12, 16)
- Tasy Hudson – drums (3–5, 7–12, 14, 16), percussion (3, 5, 9–11, 14, 16)
- Burke Reid – mixing (3–5, 7–12, 14, 16)
- Jonas Bonnetta – engineering (3–5, 7–12, 14, 16)
- Chris Hauer – electric guitar (3), acoustic guitar (4, 5, 7, 10–12, 14, 16), 12-string electric guitar (8)
- Summer Kodama – bass guitar (3, 7, 8, 11, 12, 14, 16), upright bass (5)
- Felicity DeCarle – vocals (3, 4, 7–12, 14), engineering (3, 7–10, 12, 14), harmonica (3, 7, 10, 16), synthesizer (9)
- Brigitte Naggar – vocals, engineering (5)
- Thomas Molander – production (6, 13, 15), drums (6, 13), engineering (14), acoustic guitar (15)
- Al Carlson – mixing (6, 13, 15)
- Sebastien Perry – engineering (6, 13, 15)
- Conor Molander – harmonica (10)
