= Robb Nansel =

Robb Nansel is a musician and president of Saddle Creek Records. He is also credited as a member of Commander Venus and Bright Eyes.

Nansel met Mike Mogis while at school at the University of Nebraska Lincoln.

In 2007, Nansel opened The Slow Down with partner Jason Kulbel, a 470 capacity venue in the North Downtown area of Omaha, NE.

== Album Appearances ==
- Bright Eyes - Letting off the Happiness (1998 · Saddle Creek)
