= Petey USA =

American musician and TikTok personality

- Also known as: 90 Pounds of Pete (2012–2016); Petey (2020–2025)
- Born: Peter Martin; November 17, 1991 (age 34); Royal Oak, Michigan, U.S.
- Genres: indie rock; emo; electropop
- Occupations: Musician; songwriter; social media personality; comedian
- Instruments: Vocals; guitar; drums
- Label: Terrible
- Formerly of: Young Jesus

TikTok information
- Page: Petey
- Followers: 1.5 million
- Last updated: 27 January 2025

Peter Martin, known professionally as Petey USA and formerly as Petey, is an American musician and social media personality who rose to prominence on TikTok during the COVID-19 pandemic. He has 1.5 million followers on the social media platform, and has released three studio albums.

== Early life ==
Martin was born in Royal Oak, Michigan, on November 17, 1991, and raised in Winnetka, Illinois, where he attended Crow Island Elementary School and graduated from New Trier High School. He played with the emo bands Young Jesus and Sunset & Camden and graduated from Loyola University New Orleans before moving to California in 2013, where for a time he lived in a hand-made tent in a friend's backyard.

== Musical career ==
While attending Loyola University in New Orleans, Martin released music under "90 Pounds of Pete" with fellow Music Industry junior, Adam Stewart. They released a handful of singles as well as two EPs, "Promiseland" in 2012 (locally) and "Perfect High Five" in 2016. Notably, a single with vocals from Devon Baldwin was released prior to "Perfect High Five" attracting more attention to Martin's work.

Petey was signed to Terrible in 2020, and has released two albums and several standalone singles with the label. In 2022, he embarked on a US tour, including playing festivals such as Lollapalooza and Outside Lands. In March 2022, he released a short film called Lean Into Life, based on his 2021 album of the same name, directed by Director Crane.

== Comedy ==
Martin's TikToks, created together with his friend and manager Will Crane (known sometimes as Director Crane), have been described as "wholesome" and "absurd", and feature him playing multiple characters, using many quick cuts to stitch the skits together. Martin began making sketches on TikTok when his nascent career in music was disrupted by the COVID-19 pandemic and has parlayed his popularity on the platform into sponsorship deals and collaborations with other figures like Limp Bizkit frontman Fred Durst and Grateful Dead member Bob Weir.

In an interview with Jeremy Bolm for Bolm's podcast The First Ever Podcast, Martin revealed that his approach to writing and creating comedy was largely inspired by actors Dana Carvey and Fred Armisen, as well as shows such as Flight of the Conchords, Saturday Night Live, Reno 911 and It's Always Sunny in Philadelphia.

== Discography ==
Studio albums

- Lean Into Life (2021, Terrible Records)
- USA (2023, Capitol Records)
- The Yips (2025, Capitol Records)
- oooo (2026)

Compilation albums

- Other Stuff (2021, Terrible Records)

Singles (as lead artist)

- "Apple TV Remote" (2020)
- "More to Life Than Baseball" (2020)
- "DON'T TELL THE BOYS" (2020)
- "Crash into Me" (2020)
- "Haircut" (feat. Miya Folick) (2021)
- "Lean Into Life" (2021)
- "We Go On Walks" (2021)
- "Big Bad!" (2022)
- "Bags Theme" (2023)
- "I'll Wait" (2023)
- "Did I Mention I'm Sorry" (2023)
- "The Freedom to Fuck Off" (2023)
- "Family of Six" (2023)
- "Model Train Town" (2025)
- "The Milkman" (2025)
- "As Two People Drift Apart" (2025)
- "Anything In Between" (2025)
- “Not to Make it About Me” (2025)
- “Kiss the City” (2026)
- “Like a Mantra” (2026)
- "Save for the Horses" (2026)

Singles (as featured artist)

- "Bloodoath" (EXES feat. Petey, 2020)
- "KALEIDOSCOPE" (Phony feat. Petey, 2022)
