= Ladyfinger (ne) =

American rock band

- Origin: Omaha, Nebraska, United States
- Genres: Indie rock, punk rock, post-hardcore
- Years active: 2004–present
- Label: Saddle Creek
- Members: Pat Oakes, Dan Brennan, Chris Machmuller and Jamie Massey.
- Past members: Ethan Jones
- Website: http://saddle-creek.com/ladyfingerne/

Ladyfinger (ne) is a four-piece musical outfit from Omaha, Nebraska. The (ne) at the end of their name is a reference to the official abbreviation for their home state of Nebraska, as such the band's full name is typically pronounced as "Ladyfinger Nebraska". They were obligated to add it to their band name in order to avoid copyright issues.

== Band members ==
| Name | Instrument | Years With Band | Other Projects |
|---|---|---|---|
| Chris Machmuller | Guitar/Vocals | 2004–Present | Bleeders For Treats |
| Jamie Massey | Guitar | 2004–Present | Race for Titles |
| Pat Oakes | Drums | 2004–Present | Mayday, Solid Jackson, Putrescine |
| Ethan Jones | Bass Guitar | 2004–2009 | The Faint, Putrescine |
| Dan Brennan | Bass Guitar | 2009–Present | The '89 Cubs |

== History ==
The band formed in 2004, bringing together musicians from several other groups from the Omaha independent music scene. Since their formation, they have released three albums, all of which were released by Saddle Creek Records, famous for bands such as Bright Eyes, The Faint and Cursive, and produced by Matt Bayles, famous for his work with groups such as Soundgarden, Pearl Jam, and Minus the Bear. The group is known for playing a decidedly fast-paced, forceful style of music, a departure from the folk inspired music that is traditionally associated with their label. The band members themselves list their greatest musical influences as 1970's classic rock and punk rock from the '80s and '90s. Their style has, however, changed slightly over time. This is most notable between the band's second and third albums, where the group took a brief hiatus before returning with slightly altered lineup, seeing bassist Ethan Jones replaced by Dan Brennan. Their newest album has been described by critics as being more precise, clearer, and even prettier than their previous albums, which were described as having a sense of "manic intensity." In addition to releasing albums, Ladyfinger (ne) has also toured extensively across North America and Europe. They have toured with bands such as Cursive, The Bronx, Little Brazil, Landing on the Moon, and Noah's Ark was a Spaceship, as well as performing at the South by Southwest music festival.

== Discography ==
- Heavy Hands (9/26/2006)
- Dusk (2/3/2009)
- Record Store Day Picture Disk (Featuring Cursive) (4/18/2009)
- Errant Forms (2/5/2013)

== Critical response ==
The band's first album, Heavy Hands, was ultimately not terribly successful critically or commercially. Its sales numbers were extremely disappointing and well below the typically results of Saddle Creek releases. Many attribute this to the fact that the post-hardcore rock music the band produced was so radically different from what is expected from the label known as world renown producers of lighter, folk inspired music. Others attribute the albums poor sales to poorly targeted touring in support of it. Despite poor sales, Saddle Creek kept the band on to produce their second album, which was drastically more successful. In addition to a significant increase in sales numbers, the band's sophomore effort, Dusk, earned them a great deal of critical praise, and is clearly the band's most highly regarded album. Review collecting site Metacritic.com shows the album to have earned a score of 74 out of 100 when averaging major critics' opinions, which were unanimously in the "positive" range. The band continues to earn critical respect and audience attention with their third album, released in early 2013, which critics have noted for being a more precise, nuanced, and even mature album than their previous two releases. Popular internet radio site last.fm lists "Little Things," the single off of Dusk, as their most popular and listened to song.
