= Disq =

American indie rock band

- Origin: Madison, Wisconsin, U.S.
- Genres: Indie rock; power pop
- Years active: 2016–present
- Label: Saddle Creek Records
- Members: Isaac deBroux-Slone; Raina Bock; Shannon Connor; Logan Severson; Stu Manley

Disq is an American indie rock band from Madison, Wisconsin. They have released two full-length albums and one extended play.

== History ==
Disq began while bassist/vocalist Raina Bock and guitarist/vocalist Isaac deBroux-Slone were in middle school. In 2016, Disq independently released their first project, an EP titled Disq 1. After this release, the band returned in 2020 as a five-piece, now featuring guitarist/keyboardist Shannon Connor, guitarist Logan Severson and drummer Stu Manley, having signed to Saddle Creek Records.

The band announced their debut album in 2020 titled Collector. The album received positive reviews. In mid-2022, Disq announced their second full-length album, Desperately Imagining Somewhere Quiet, which would be the first of their albums to feature equally split songwriting and lead vocal contributions from deBroux-Slone, Bock, Connor and Severson. The album was released on October 7, 2022, to generally positive reviews.
