= Nicks and Grazes =

Studio album by Palm
- Released: October 14, 2022
- Genre: Avant rock; art rock; indie rock
- Length: 40:48
- Label: Saddle Creek Records

Palm chronology
Rock Island (2018)	Nicks and Grazes (2022)

Professional ratings
Review scores
Source	Rating
AllMusic	4/5 stars
Pitchfork	8.0/10

Nicks and Grazes is the third and final studio album by American band Palm. It was released in October 2022 under Saddle Creek Records.

== Track listing ==
No.	Title	Length
1.	"Touch And Go"	2:50
2.	"Feathers"	4:15
3.	"Parable Lickers"	3:53
4.	"Eager Copy"	3:50
5.	"Brille"	0:56
6.	"On The Sly"	3:28
7.	"And Chairs"	1:35
8.	"Away Kit"	3:41
9.	"Suffer Dragon"	1:47
10.	"Mirror Mirror"	3:58
11.	"Glen Beige"	2:53
12.	"Tumbleboy"	6:04
13.	"Nicks And Grazes"	1:38
Total length:		40:48

== Critical reception ==
Pitchfork describes the album as "dizzying and complex without losing sight of the progressive rigor that has guided the band since its beginnings."

AllMusic describes the album as, "Taking inspiration from electronic music as well as metal, their third album, Nicks and Grazes, dials up the noise and the intricacy for an even more narcotic and impenetrable outing that remains nonetheless lock-step tight, performance-wise."
