= Old Canes =

- Origin: Lawrence, Kansas, U.S.
- Genres: Indie rock, Folk rock
- Years active: 2002–present
- Labels: Second Nature Recordings; Saddle Creek
- Members: Christopher Crisci; John Momberg; Rusty Scott; Lucas Oswald; Taylor Holenbeck
- Website: www.oldcanes.net www.secondnaturerecordings.com

Old Canes is a rock band from Lawrence, Kansas currently composed of frontman Christopher Crisci (of The Appleseed Cast) and additional touring musicians. Because most of the band members, including Crisci, participate in other bands, Old Canes is joined on tour by other available musicians known to the band, including John Momberg (of The Appleseed Cast), Taylor Holenbeck, Sam Goodell, Rusty Scott, Kelly Hangauer (of Fourth Of July), Lucas Oswald (Minus Story) and Jeff Stolz, in what they call a "musical collective." Past members include Nathan Richardson (Casket Lottery), Jordan Geiger (Minus Story), Eric Verhar, Tyler French (Minus Story), Gabriel Booth, Kelsey Richardson, and Jon Anderson (Boys Life).

== History ==
Old Canes was established in October 2001, when Chris Crisci played several solo acoustic shows. Playing as part of a European tour with Crisci's primary band, the Appleseed Cast, promoters wanted the band to play acoustic. Having acoustic material written that was never recorded, Crisci performed three Appleseed Cast demos that were repurposed as Old Canes songs. After encouragement from supporters who appreciated the contrasting folk sound to the Appleseed Cast, he formally pursued the Old Canes a year and a half later.

After releasing a demo in 2003, Old Canes released Early Morning Hymns in 2004, recorded in Crisci's home studio on a half-inch eight-track tape. Although the band's label, Second Nature, encouraged Crisci to have an established producer to mix the album, he worked the album himself. Crisci envisioned a lo-fi sound, citing Led Zeppelin, Bob Dylan and Jimi Hendrix.

In 2005, Crisci began recording the second record, Feral Harmonic. The first drum tracks were produced by John Anderson of Boys Life.

The record was released in 2009 on Saddle Creek Records.

== Discography ==
=== Albums ===
- Early Morning Hymns, 2004
- Feral Harmonic, 2009
