= Adult Film (album) =

Studio album by Tim Kasher
- Released: October 8, 2013
- Genre: Indie rock
- Length: 38:20
- Label: Saddle Creek Records

Tim Kasher chronology
Bigamy: More Songs from the Monogamy Sessions (2011)	Adult Film (2013)

Adult Film is the second solo studio album by Tim Kasher of the bands Cursive and The Good Life, released on October 8, 2013 on Saddle Creek Records.

== Critical reception ==
Adult Film received a "weighted average" score of 69 on music review aggregation site Metacritic, indicating "generally favorable reviews" based on nine publications. Zac Djamoos of AbsolutePunk.net and Ryan J. Prado of Paste praised the album, with Djamoos remarking, "one of the best albums of the year, and arguably his most versatile yet", and Prado commenting on the songwriting complimenting the music, that "His gifts for wrangling emotive detours from unlikely sonic realms is his best talent, but he couldn’t do that without his crafty capacity for language, too." James Christopher Monger of AllMusic found the album to be "patchwork," calling Adult Film "a smorgasbord of pop ephemera, with melodies crashing about like boozy butterflies, occasionally landing on an idea and then leaping back into the blue in search of less restrictive stimuli" and defining this as a major weakness of the album. American Songwriter's Charlie Zaillian shared similar observations, that "There aren’t many hooks to latch onto...no amount of electronic drums, thickly-layered synths, Spanish guitars and theremins can cover a humdrum set of songs."

== Track listing ==
All songs written by Tim Kasher.

No.	Title	Length
1.	"American Lit"	3:14
2.	"Truly Freaking Out"	3:29
3.	"Where's Your Heart Lie"	4:26
4.	"The Willing Cuckold"	3:48
5.	"Life and Limbo"	3:30
6.	"Lay Down Your Weapons"	5:34
7.	"You Scare Me to Death"	3.27
8.	"A Raincloud is a Raincloud"	2:55
9.	"A Looping Distress Signal"	4:01
10.	"A Lullaby, sort of"	4:46
Total length:		38:20

== Personnel ==
- Tim Kasher - lead vocals, guitar, various instruments
- Sarah Bertuldo - bass, vocals
- Patrick Newbery - organ, keys, synths, horns
- Dylan Ryan - drums

=== Additional personnel ===
- Nate Kinsella - drums
- Laura Stevenson - vocals
