= Business Casual (Beep Beep album) =

Studio album by Beep Beep
- Released: August 24, 2004
- Genre: Electronic
- Length: 30:18
- Label: Saddle Creek Records

Beep Beep chronology
Business Casual (2004)	Enchanted Islands (2009)

Professional ratings
Aggregate scores
Source	Rating
Metacritic	53/100
Review scores
Source	Rating
AllMusic	3/5 stars
Alternative Press	3/5 stars
Blender	3/5 stars
NME	5/10
Pitchfork	6.8/10
PopMatters	4/10
Q	2/5 stars
Rolling Stone	2/5 stars
Tiny Mix Tapes	3/5 stars
Under the Radar	8/10

Business Casual is the debut studio album by American band Beep Beep. It was released August 24, 2004 on Saddle Creek Records.

This album is the 63rd release of Saddle Creek Records.

== Critical reception ==
Business Casual was met with "mixed or average" reviews from critics. At Metacritic, which assigns a weighted average rating out of 100 to reviews from mainstream publications, this release received an average score of 53 based on 13 reviews.

In a review for Pitchfork, critic reviewer Brian Howe wrote: "One can't accuse Beep Beep of being lackluster or uninspired. Business Casual is fierce and competent, and evinces the rippling of powerful musical muscles. But its affectations are so grating that it's tough to make it through it all in a single listen."

== Track listing ==
Business Casual track listing
No.	Title	Length
1.	"I am the Secretary"	3:09
2.	"Oh No!"	2:19
3.	"Misuse their Bodies"	3:45
4.	"Giggle Giggle"	3:00
5.	"Electronic Wolves"	3:02
6.	"Chewy Poison"	0:41
7.	"Executive Foliage"	2:03
8.	"The Fluorescent Lights"	2:30
9.	"Vertical Cougar"	3:05
10.	"The Threat of Nature"	6:44

== Musicians ==
- Eric Bemberger
- Chris Hughes
- Katie Muth
- Mike Sweeney
- AJ Mogis - Hammond B-3, Mellowtron, Octave Cat, Engineering
- Andy LeMaster - Mixing
- Doug Van Sloun - Mastering
- Joel Peterson - Nord Lead2
