= Commander Venus =

American indie rock band

- Origin: Omaha, Nebraska, USA
- Genres: Emo; punk rock; post-hardcore; indie rock
- Years active: 1995–1997
- Labels: Saddle Creek; Grass Records
- Past members: Ben Armstrong; Todd Baechle; Matt Bowen; Tim Kasher; Robb Nansel; Conor Oberst

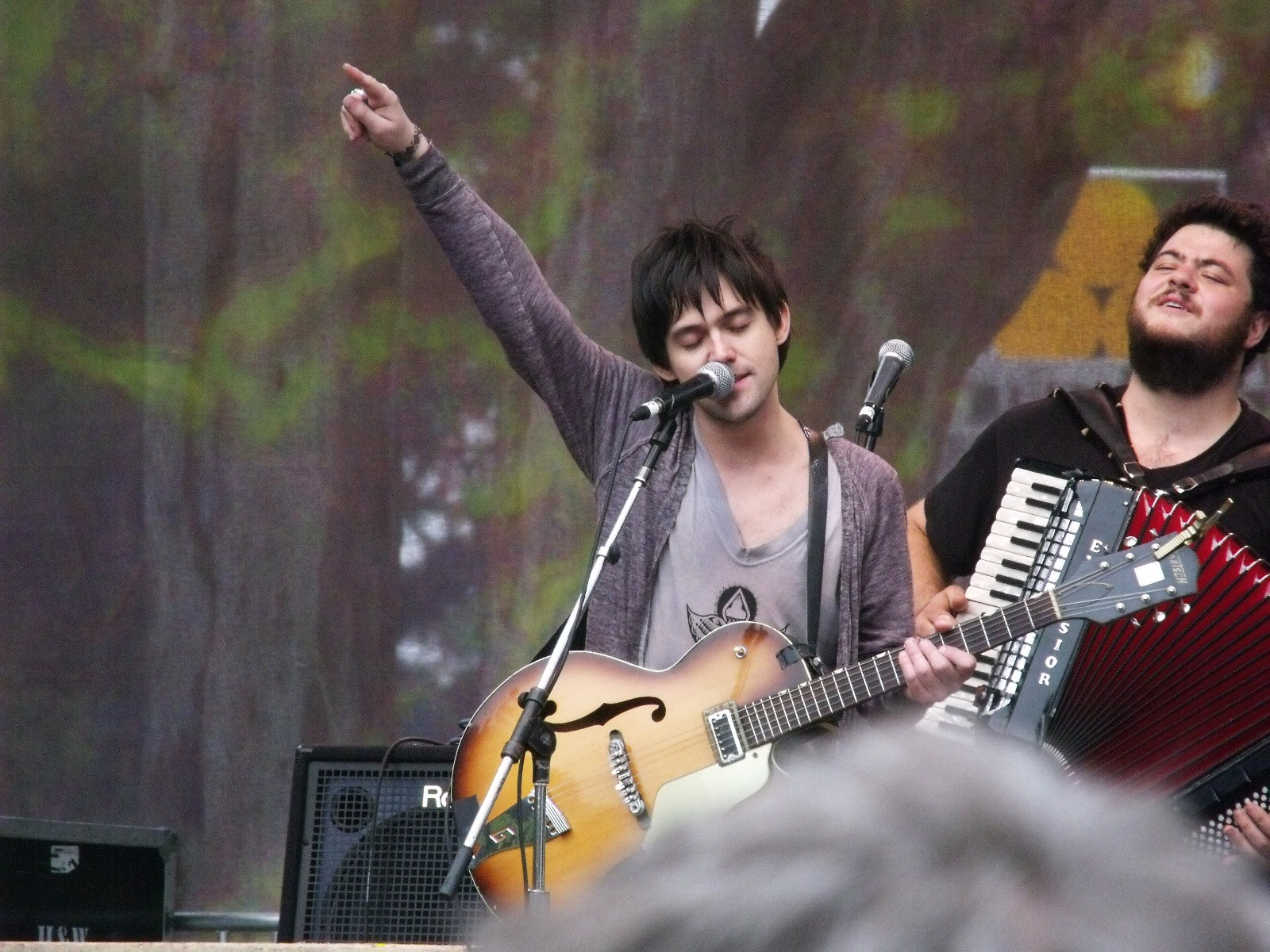
Conor Oberst in 2010

Commander Venus was an American emo band from Omaha, Nebraska. Fronted by Conor Oberst and Tim Kasher, the band also included Todd Fink and Matt Bowen of The Faint, Ben Armstrong of Head of Femur and Robb Nansel, executive producer of the indie label Saddle Creek. Kasher subsequently went on to front the band Cursive, and Oberst later became famous as the core member of the indie folk collective Bright Eyes, and later the punk band Desaparecidos.

They recorded two albums, Do You Feel at Home? on Saddle Creek and The Uneventful Vacation, on Grass Records, which became Wind-up Records, that ultimately licensed the CD to Thick Records.

== Members ==
- Conor Oberst – vocals, guitars (1994–1998)
- Robb Nansel – guitars (1994–1998)
- Tim Kasher – bass (1994–1997)
- Todd Baechle – bass (1997–1998)
- Matt Bowen – drums (1994–1997)
- Ben Armstrong – drums (1997–1998)

== Discography ==
=== Albums ===
- Do You Feel at Home? (1995; CD & LP on Saddle Creek)
- The Uneventful Vacation (1997; CD THICK Records, LP on Saddle Creek)

=== Singles ===
- Music Me All Over (1997; 7" split with Lux-O-Values, Norman Bailer & Weld on Saddle Creek)
- Some Songs (1996; 7" split with Drip on Saddle Creek & Ghostmeat Records)

=== Compilations ===
- Apollo's Salvage (1995; CD on Ghostmeat Records; features the song "Pay Per View")
- Saddle Creek Records, A Sampler (1998; CD on Saddle Creek; featured the songs "Bent on Broken Nerves" & "Waiting for Enoch Arden")

== See also ==
- Bright Eyes (band)
- Cursive (band)
- Head of Femur (band)
