= Young Jesus =

American art rock band

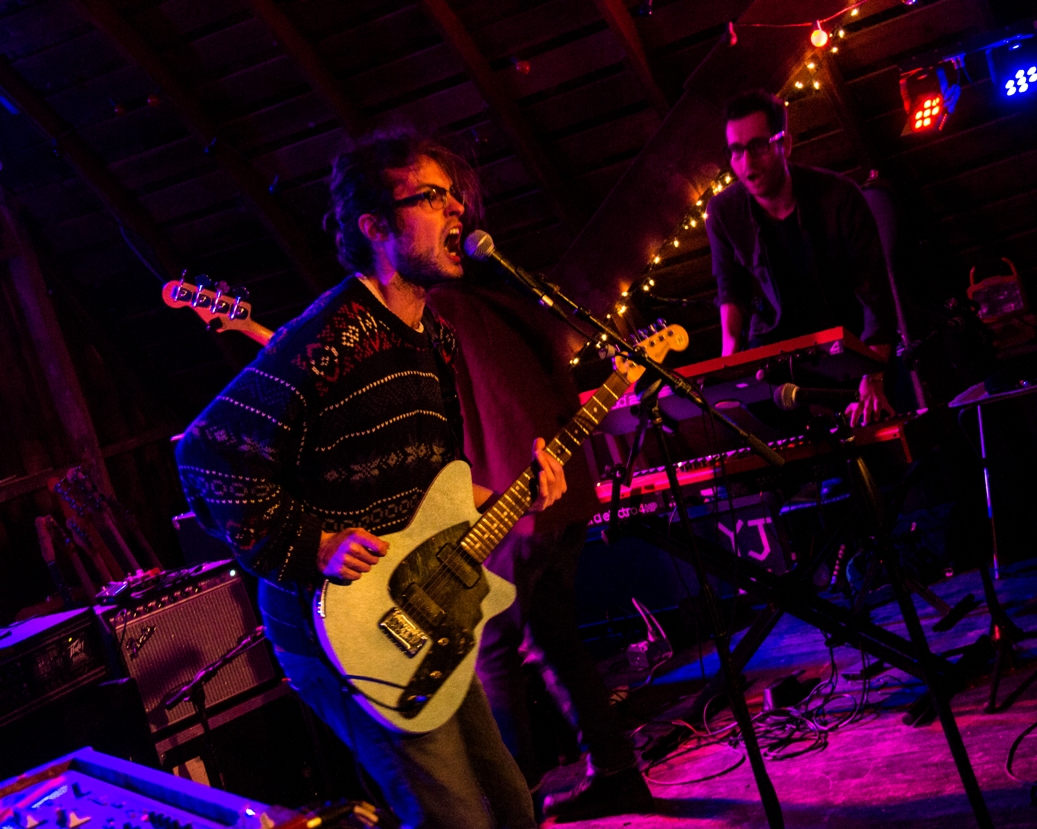

Background information
- Origin: Chicago, Illinois, United States
- Genres: Indie rock, post-rock
- Years active: 2009–present
- Labels: Gigantic Noise, Saddle Creek
- Members: John Rossiter
- Past members: Cody Kellogg; Peter Martin; Shawn Nystrand; Garrison Benson; Eric Shevrin; Marcel Borbon; Kern Haug

Young Jesus is an American indie rock band from Chicago, Illinois. Since 2014, the band has been based out of Los Angeles, California.

== History ==
Young Jesus began as a high school band in the Chicago suburbs, consisting of two members who are no longer in the band. While located in Chicago, there were two side projects featuring members of Young Jesus: Bummer and Wavepool. As of the release of their debut album Home, in 2012, the band featured Rossiter, along with bassist Shawn Nystrand, lead guitarist Cody Kellogg, and drummer Peter Martin. The only member of that lineup still in Young Jesus is Rossiter; Shevrin was a member of the band from 2015 until 2020 and Borbon and Haug were members since 2016.

Young Jesus released the full-length album Grow/Decompose on Gigantic Noise Records in 2015. In 2017, Young Jesus signed to Saddle Creek Records, where they have released five full-length albums. In 2020, they contributed to the benefit compilation The Song is Coming from Inside the House organized by Strange Ranger in light of the COVID-19 pandemic.

== Musical style ==
Young Jesus is not a Christian rock band, although they have been mistaken for one due to their name. The band is influenced by Midwest emo and jazz, and post-rock. Their lyrics are influenced by ancient Chinese poetry, specifically from the Chan Buddhist and Taoist tradition.

== Discography ==
Studio albums

- Home (2012, self-released)
- Grow/Decompose (2015, Gigantic Noise)
- S/T (2017, Saddle Creek)
- The Whole Thing Is Just There (2018, Saddle Creek)
- Welcome to Conceptual Beach (2020, Saddle Creek)
- Shepherd Head (2022, Saddle Creek)
- The Fool (2024, Saddle Creek)

Extended Plays

- Young, Innocent, & Hairy (2010, self-released)
- Maybe Baby (2011, self-released)
- Void as Lob (2016, Gigantic Noise)
