= I Know Your Troubles Been Long =

Studio album by Mayday
- Released: 2003
- Genres: Indie, folk
- Label: Bar/None

Mayday chronology
Old Blood (2002)	I Know Your Troubles Been Long (2003)	Bushido Karaoke (2005)

Professional ratings
Review scores
Source	Rating
Alternative Press	4/5

I Know Your Troubles Been Long is the second studio album released by the band Mayday. The album was released on May 6, 2003, on Bar/None Records and Greyday Records. The album was recorded on an eight-track recorder in singer Ted Stevens' home.

== Track listing ==
1. Lone Star
2. Dyzfunctional Cuzin
3. Running Away
4. Lesson One for Children: Church/Steeple
5. Lost Serenade
6. Old Blood
7. From the Trapeze
8. Little Tremors
9. Virginia
10. Crawfish River
11. Lesson Two for Children: Making Biscuits
12. Lesson Three for Children: Listen, Listen
13. Laundromat
14. Lesson for Sisters and Daughters
