= Stef Chura =

American musician

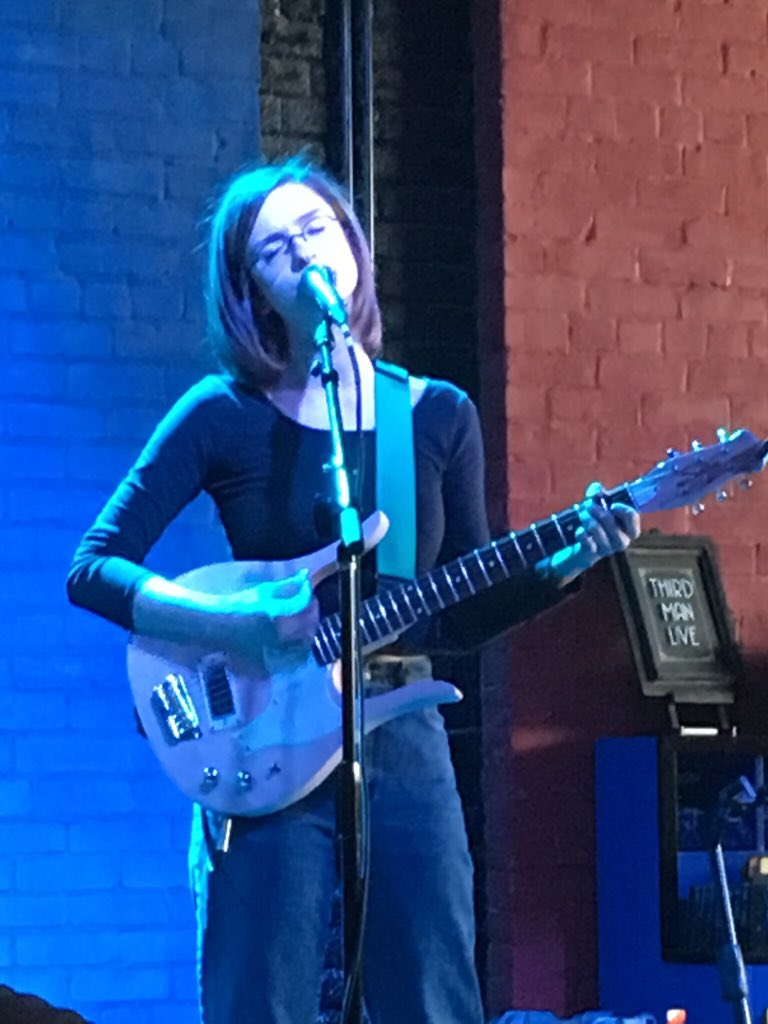

Background information
- Origin: Detroit, Michigan, US
- Genre: Indie rock
- Occupations: Singer, songwriter
- Years active: 2009–present
- Label: Saddle Creek Records
- Website: stefchura.com

Stef Chura is an American indie rock musician from Detroit, Michigan.

== Biography ==
Chura is originally from Alpena, Michigan. She moved to the Ypsilanti area of Michigan in 2009, where she began playing shows. Chura moved to Detroit in 2012 and began home-recording and self-releasing her songs, while also playing bass in friends’ bands. After years of promoting her home recordings, the death of a close friend prompted Chura to record an album. “One of my best friends passed away and I thought, what do I have to do before I die? I have to at least make one record.”

== Career ==
Chura released her debut full-length album in 2017 titled Messes, to positive reviews from Pitchfork, Rolling Stone, and Exclaim! In November 2017, Chura announced plans to release a reissue of her album Messes, and that she has signed to Saddle Creek Records, who will put out the reissue. Messes was officially reissued February 2, 2018.

Following the reissue of Messes, Chura told DIY Magazine she was already working on a follow-up album to be produced by Will Toledo from Car Seat Headrest. On April 21, 2018 (Record Store Day), Chura released a 7-inch, Degrees B/W Sour Honey produced by Toledo. The 7-inch features two songs that were cut from her debut album Messes, “Degrees" and "Sour Honey". Audiofemme gave Degrees B/W Sour Honey a positive review, saying it "show[s] Chura’s range in emotion, voice, and musicianship". Chura's second studio album, Midnight was released on June 7, 2019.

In July 2026, Chura released "Danny" as the lead single for her album Dancing Alone on the Concrete. It was released on October 2, 2026.

== Discography ==
=== Studio albums ===
- Messes (2017, Urinal Cake Records)
- Midnight (2019, Saddle Creek Records)
- Dancing Alone on the Concrete (2026, Saddle Creek Records)

=== Singles ===
- "Degrees" B/W "Sour Honey" (2018, Saddle Creek Records)
