= Bushido Karaoke =

Studio album by Mayday
- Released: June 21, 2005
- Label: Saddle Creek Records

Mayday chronology
I Know Your Troubles Been Long (2003)	Bushido Karaoke (2005)

Professional ratings
Review scores
Source	Rating
AllMusic	4.5/5 stars
Pitchfork	7.5/10
PopMatters	8/10
Tiny Mix Tapes	2/5 stars
Ox-Fanzine	8/10
Visions	6/12
Mondo Sonoro	

Bushido Karaoke is the third full-length album by Nebraska's Mayday, full of songs of death, dismemberment, drugs, greed, and devotion. It was released on June 21, 2005.

The marketing for the album described it thus: "Like the teenage death ballads of the '50s, Mayday casts an odd sort of instrumentation and lyricism into romantic ballads of the afterlife. Percussive, choral, upbeat, morbid, scatological, rootsy-indie-wit. A bluesy country mythological storybook. Bushido Karaoke travels from the Old West ("Song of the Scaffold") to the modern one ("Hidden Leaves"), from Australia to Mesopotamia ("Old World New World"), to hell and back ("Standing in Line at the Gates of Hell") and into the caverns of history."

This album is the 76th release of Saddle Creek Records.

== Track listing ==
1. "Pelf Help"
2. "Booze & Pills"
3. "Standing in Line at the Gates of Hell"
4. "Continental Grift"
5. "Old World New World"
6. "Hidden Leaves"
7. "Father Time"
8. "I'm Not Afraid to Die"
9. "Rock and Roll Can't Save Your Life"
10. "Burned My Hands"
11. "Dave D. Blues (How to Make it Sting Like a Career)"
12. "Billy Boy Blues (Day of the Dead Blues)"
13. "Exquisite Corpse"
14. "Song of the Scaffold"
