= Someone Else's Deja Vu =

Someone Else's Déjà Vu

Studio album by Son, Ambulance
- Released: July 8, 2008
- Recorded: December 2007
- Studio: ARC Studios
- Genre: Alternative rock; indie rock
- Length: 1:02:22
- Label: Saddle Creek; LBJ-120
- Producer: Joe Knapp; Jeff Koster; A. J. Mogis

Son, Ambulance chronology
Key (2004)	Someone Else's Déjà Vu (2008)

Someone Else's Déjà Vu is the third full-length studio album by American alternative indie rock band Son, Ambulance. It was released on July 8, 2008, via Saddle Creek Records. Recording sessions took place at ARC Studios in December 2007. Production was handled by Joe Knapp, Jeff Koster and A. J. Mogis.

The album is divided into four parts: A View of Minstrel Town (tracks 1–3), About the Public Square (tracks 4–7), To A Deserted Town (tracks 9–11), and Farewell Pulse (the final two tracks). Track 8, "And" (a forty-three second noise track), is not included in the list (though one would assume it to finish About the Public Square).

== Critical reception ==
Professional ratings
Aggregate scores
Source	Rating
Metacritic	67/100
Review scores
Source	Rating
AllMusic	4/5 stars
Drowned in Sound	5/10
Pitchfork	5.4/10
PopMatters	8/10
Spin	3.5/5 stars
Tiny Mix Tapes	2.5/5 marks

Someone Else's Déjà Vu was met with generally favourable reviews from music critics. At Metacritic, which assigns a normalized rating out of 100 to reviews from mainstream publications, the album received an average score of 67, based on nine reviews.

AllMusic's Tim Sendra praised the album, saying "it's too bad such a fine record has to end with a misfire, but you can just hit stop before you get there and be completely satisfied with the really good album Son, Ambulance have crafted". Andrew Earles of Spin wrote: "Omaha-based multi-instrumentalist Joe Knapp spent three years making Someone Else's Déjà Vu, and the album is another reminder that lush studio-reliant soft and prog rock of the late '70s can still offer legitimate inspiration".

In mixed reviews, Ian Cohen of Pitchfork found that the album "would've benefitted from Knapp making a stronger claim of ownership to his lofty visions". Chris Beanland of Drowned in Sound stated: "the man wants so much to create a '70s-apeing epic, but fails. Yet that's not to say this is a bad record per se, it's just that Knapp's whole Son, Ambulance project has a good few obvious clangers dragging it down". Bob Marshall of Tiny Mix Tapes called "Knapp and Koster’s experiment was more failure than success".

== Track listing ==
A View of Minstrel Town
No.	Title	Writer(s)	Length
1.	"A Girl in New York City"	Joseph Andrew Knapp	4:47
2.	"Legend of Lizeth"	Knapp; Jeffrey Koster	6:18
3.	"Quand Tu Marches Seul"	Knapp	5:19

About the Public Square
No.	Title	Writer(s)	Length
4.	"Wild Roses"	Knapp; Koster	4:03
5.	"Horizons"	Knapp	2:52
6.	"Yesterday Morning"	Knapp	6:57
7.	"Constellations"	Knapp	4:05

No.	Title	Length
8.	"And"	0:43

To a Deserted Town
No.	Title	Writer(s)	Length
9.	"Juliet's Son"	Knapp	3:50
10.	"The Renegade"	Knapp; Koster	4:45
11.	"Awakening"	Knapp	4:41

Farewell Pulse
No.	Title	Writer(s)	Length
12.	"Someone Else's Déjà Vu"	Knapp	6:20
13.	"Requiem for a Planet"	Knapp	7:42
Total length:			1:02:22

== Personnel ==
- Joseph Knapp — vocals (tracks: 1–7, 9, 11, 13), classic guitar & whistle (track 1), electric guitar (tracks: 1–4, 6, 9–12), snare (tracks: 1, 3), synthesizer (tracks: 2, 3, 13), drums (tracks: 2, 5), acoustic guitar (tracks: 3, 4, 6, 7, 9–12), piano (tracks: 3, 4, 6), cymbal & wood block (track 3), bass & glockenspiel (track 5), cabasa (track 9), mellotron (track 11), electric piano & handclaps (track 12), producer
- Jeffrey Koster — noises (track 1), congas (track 3), drums (tracks: 4, 6, 10, 12), backing vocals (tracks: 5, 6), tambourine (track 6), producer
- Jordan Elsberry — Rhodes electric piano (track 1), organ (track 5), piano (track 9)
- John Kotchian — upright bass (track 1), bass (track 3)
- Jose Ortez — drums (track 1)
- Derek Pressnall — backing vocals (tracks: 2, 4, 5)
- Jenna Morrison — backing vocals (tracks: 2, 4, 9, 12), vocals (track 3)
- Teal Gardner — backing vocals (track 2), collage and drawings
- Jesse McKelvey — bass (tracks: 2, 3)
- Craig DeMayo — cymbal (track 2)
- Daniel Knapp — electric piano & backing vocals (track 2), piano (tracks: 11, 13)
- Jim Schroeder — delay guitar & backing vocals (track 2), guitar (track 10)
- Jacob Thiele — synthesizer (tracks: 2, 10, 13)
- Kianna Alarid — backing vocals (tracks: 4, 12)
- Dereck Higgins — bass (track 4)
- James Cuato — saxophone (track 4)
- Ben Brodin — vibraphone (tracks: 4, 6, 11, 12)
- A. J. Mogis — backing vocals (track 6), electric bass (tracks: 9, 10), electric guitar (track 12), producer, recording, mixing
- Alex Aparu — bass (track 6)
- Stuart Shell — oboe (track 6)
- Neal Knapp — backing vocals (track 12)
- Neely Jenkins — backing vocals (track 12)
- Jamie Pressnall — tap dance (track 12)
- Doug Van Sloun — mastering
- Lonnie Methe — paintings
- Zack Nipper — layout
- Son, Ambulance — design
