= Nik Fackler =

American filmmaker and musician

Nik Fackler is an American filmmaker and musician. His 2008 romantic drama film Lovely, Still was nominated for a 2010 Independent Spirit Award for Best First Screenplay. His second film was an experimental documentary film, Sick Birds Die Easy (2012). Fackler is also a founding member, singer, and multi-instrumentalists of the electropop band Icky Blossoms. Fackler has also directed music videos, including for the song Don't Bring Me Down by Sia.
