= Icky Blossoms =

- Origin: Omaha, Nebraska, United States
- Genres: Electropop
- Years active: 2011–present
- Label: Saddle Creek
- Members: Sarah Bohling; Derek Pressnal; Nik Fackler
- Website: ickyblossoms.com

Icky Blossoms is an electropop trio formed in Omaha, Nebraska in 2011, bringing together singer/synth player Sarah Bohling, singer/multi-instrumentalists Derek Pressnall, lead guitarist Dylan Strimple of Son, ambulance and Spanish indie post band las Cruxes and Nik Fackler. The three became acquainted through the Omaha arts scene and Pressnall's sidebands Tilly and the Wall and Flowers Forever. In early 2012, Icky Blossoms signed to Omaha-based Saddle Creek, who released the band's self-titled, full-length LP on July 17, 2012. Produced by TV on the Radio multi-instrumentalist Dave Sitek, it is said to be an “album of sharp mechanical grooves and romantic attitude” by Spin magazine.

The Icky Blossoms' Song "Babes" was used in a trailer for the movie Sin City: A Dame to Kill For shown first at San Diego Comic-Con in July 2014. The band's second album, Mask, was released on May 12, 2015.
