= Inside/Absent =

Studio album by Broken Spindles
- Released: August 23, 2005
- Label: Saddle Creek

Professional ratings
Review scores
Source	Rating
Allmusic	link

inside/Absent is the third album by American musical group Broken Spindles, the solo project of Joel Petersen of The Faint and Beep Beep, which are all on Saddle Creek Records. It was released on August 23, 2005.

== Track listing ==
1. "Inward" - 2:40
2. "This Is an Introduction" - 3:20
3. "Burn My Body" - 2:58
4. "Please Don't Remember This" - 2:01
5. "Desaturated" - 1:30
6. "Birthday" - 2:53
7. "Distance Is Nearsighted" - 2:40
8. "Valentine" - 1:39
9. "Anniversary" - 3:21
10. "Painted Boy Face" - 3:07
