= At Weddings =

Studio album by Tomberlin
- Released: August 10, 2018
- Length: 43:21
- Label: Saddle Creek
- Producer: Owen Pallett

Tomberlin chronology
At Weddings (2018)	Projections (2020)

Professional ratings
Aggregate scores
Source	Rating
AnyDecentMusic?	7.9/10
Metacritic	82/100
Review scores
Source	Rating
The 405	8/10
AllMusic	3.5/5 stars
Exclaim!	8/10
The Line of Best Fit	9.5/10
Loud and Quiet	7/10
Paste Magazine	8.5/10
Pitchfork	7.5/10
The Skinny	4/5 stars
Sputnikmusic	4.5/5 stars
Under the Radar	7/10

At Weddings is the debut studio album by American musician Tomberlin. It was released on August 10, 2018, under Saddle Creek Records.

== Critical reception ==
At Weddings was met with "universal acclaim" reviews from critics. At Metacritic, which assigns a weighted average rating out of 100 to reviews from mainstream publications, this release received an average score of 82 based on 14 reviews. Aggregator Album of the Year gave the release an 80 out of 100 based on a critical consensus of 17 reviews.

Writing on behalf of AllMusic, Marcy Donelson said: "Tomberlin's brittle vocals are accompanied mainly by acoustic guitar with touches of keyboards and strings on an album that features performances by only the songwriter and producer Owen Pallett." Chris Gee of Exclaim! explains how Tomberlin navigates her new release "with little more than guitar, keyboards and a reverberating soft power that meticulously frees herself from the burden of a defined path." At The Line of Best Fit, Craig Howieson explains: "Guarded and beautifully measured, At Weddings has an absorbingly intimate quality. Lonesome reverberating guitars ricochet off the sparse percussion while tempered piano lines chime and assuage. Whether it be the swathes of white noise on "Tornado", the yowl of feedback on "Self-Help" or the rudimental piano line on sublime opener "Any Other Way" each embellishment hangs as if it were a carefully placed decoration. Above all of this Tomberlin's voice shines as the warm heart of the record."

=== Accolades ===
Publication	Accolade	Rank	Ref.
Stereogum	Top 50 Albums of 2018	20	
The Line of Best Fit	Top 50 Albums of 2018	24	

== Tracklist ==
No.	Title	Length
1.	"Any Other Way"	3:22
2.	"Untitled 1"	4:51
3.	"Tornado"	3:36
4.	"You Are Here"	3:44
5.	"A Video Game"	5:12
6.	"I'm Not Scared"	4:52
7.	"Seventeen"	4:31
8.	"Self-Help"	3:17
9.	"Untitled 2"	4:36
10.	"February"	5:20

== Personnel ==
Musicians

- Sarah Beth Tomberlin – primary artist, vocals, guitar

Production

- Owen Pallett – engineer, mixing, producer
- Paul Gold – mastering
