= Key (Son, Ambulance album) =

Studio album by Son, Ambulance
- Released: October 26, 2004
- Genre: Indie folk; indie pop; indie rock
- Length: 54:38
- Label: Saddle Creek
- Producer: Son, Ambulance

Son, Ambulance chronology
Euphemystic (2001)	Key (2004)	Someone Else's Deja Vu (2008)

Key is the second full-length release from Omaha, NE's Son, Ambulance, released on October 26, 2004, by Saddle Creek Records.

It is the 71st release from Saddle Creek Records.

== Critical reception ==
Professional ratings
Aggregate scores
Source	Rating
Metacritic	60/100
Review scores
Source	Rating
AllMusic	3/5 stars
Pitchfork	7.5/10
PopMatters	(mixed)
Punknews.org (2004)	2/5 stars
Punknews.org (2005)	0.5/5 stars

Key was met with mixed reviews. At Metacritic, which assigns a rating out of 100 to reviews from professional publications, the album received a weighted average score of 60, based on nine reviews, indicating "mixed or average reviews".

Upon release, critics were divided on its songwriting and overall impact. Positive reviews highlighted the album's detailed production and emotional depth, with Splendid and Paste both awarding it four stars and praising its musicianship and headphone-friendly intricacy. Pitchfork gave it a 7.5 out of 10, noting a shift toward more expansive pop arrangements compared to the band's earlier work. However, other critics were less enthusiastic. The A.V. Club and PopMatters offered more tempered assessments, citing issues with pacing and a lack of originality. Meanwhile, Under the Radar, Alternative Press, Blender, and Junkmedia delivered harsh criticisms, pointing to unremarkable songwriting and a lack of distinctiveness, with scores ranging from 2.5 stars to as low as one star.

== Track listing ==
Key track listing
No.	Title	Length
1.	"Entropy"	0:40
2.	"Paper Snowflakes"	4:15
3.	"Billy Budd"	3:49
4.	"Chlorophyll"	4:54
5.	"Sex in C Minor"	7:02
6.	"C Minor Interlude"	1:27
7.	"House Guest"	4:34
8.	"Taxi-Cab Driver"	3:16
9.	"Case of You/Wrinkle, Wrinkle"	8:48
10.	"Glitter Angel"	4:33
11.	"If I Should Fall Asleep"	5:39
12.	"Pleasure, Now"	5:19
13.	"[untitled track]"	0:22
Total length:		54:38

== Personnel ==
Musicians

- Corey Broman – drums
- Daniel Knapp – piano, keyboards
- Joe Knapp – vocals, guitar
- Erica Peterson – bass, vocals
- Dylan Strimple – lead guitar
- Becky Allen – vocals
- Austin Britton – saxophone
- Carrie Butler – violin
- Kate Falkowski – monologue
- Landon Hedges – guitar
- Tim Kasher – accordion
- Neal Knapp – phone message
- Jenna Morrison – lyrics and vocals
- Conor Oberst – lyrics
- Heather Schulte – vocals

Production

- AJ Mogis – recording, mixing, engineering
- Mike Mogis – preliminary tracking
- Doug Van Sloun – mastering
- Son, Ambulance – production

Artwork

- Jenna Morrison
- Daniel Knapp
- Matt Koster
- Jeff Koster
- Casey Scott
- Jadon Ulrich
