= Kassie Krut =

American experimental electronic outfit

- Origin: New York, New York, U.S.
- Genres: Experimental; Synth punk
- Years active: 2020–present
- Label: Fire Talk Records
- Members: Eve Alpert; Kasra Kurt; Matt Anderegg
- Website: kassiekrut.bandcamp.com

Kassie Krut is an American experimental electronic band consisting of Kasra Kurt and Eve Alpert, both members of the defunct band Palm, as well as Matt Anderegg.

== Career ==
Kassie Krut was originally formed as a solo project of Kasra Krut while apart of Palm to explore electronic music and released a debut single, "K.A.S.S.I.E.", in 2020. When Palm dissolved, Kasra Kurt and Eve Alpert moved to New York alongside collaborator and producer Matt Anderegg and began working under Kassie Krut. In 2022, the group released two more songs, titled "Copycat" and "Killing It".

In 2024, the group released a new song titled "Reckless" and announced their signing to Fire Talk Records. In October 2024, the group released a second single, "Racing Man", from their upcoming EP. Shortly after, the group's debut self-titled EP released on December 6, 2024.

== Discography ==
EPs

- Kassie Krut (2024, Fire Talk Records)
