= Rock Island (Palm album) =

Studio album by Palm
- Released: February 9, 2018
- Genres: Avant rock; art rock; indie rock
- Length: 41:26
- Label: Carpark

Palm chronology
Shadow Expert (2017)	Rock Island (2018)	Nicks and Grazes (2022)

Professional ratings
Aggregate scores
Source	Rating
Metacritic	69/100
Review scores
Source	Rating
AllMusic	3.5/5 stars
Motif	very favorable
Popmatters	very favorable
Pitchfork	6.8/10
Q	3/5 stars
Sputnikmusic	3.7/5
Tiny Mix Tapes	3.5/5 stars

Rock Island is the second studio album by American band Palm. It was released in February 2018 under Carpark Records.

== Track listing ==
No.	Title	Length
1.	"Pearly"	2:47
2.	"Composite"	4:13
3.	"Dog Milk"	5:19
4.	"Forced Hand"	4:26
5.	"Theme From Rock Island"	2:18
6.	"Bread"	4:53
7.	"Color Code"	2:46
8.	"Swimmer"	4:32
9.	"Heavy Lifting"	4:43
10.	"20664"	1:24
11.	"(Didn't What You Want) Happen"	4:05
Total length:		41:26
