= Ada Lea =

Canadian musician

- Born: Alexandra Levy; Montreal, Quebec, Canada
- Occupations: Singer-songwriter, visual artist, record producer
- Years active: 2019–present
- Style: Indie rock, indie pop
- Website: adaleamusic.com

Alexandra Levy, better known by her stage name Ada Lea, is a Canadian indie rock musician and visual artist from Montreal. She is currently signed to Saddle Creek Records.

Her debut studio album, What We Say in Private, was released on 19 July 2019 to positive reviews from music critics. On 24 September 2021, she released her second album, One Hand on the Steering Wheel the Other Sewing a Garden, which was longlisted for the 2022 Polaris Music Prize.

On 8 August 2025, Levy released her third studio album, When I Paint My Masterpiece.

== Discography ==
Studio albums

- 2019: What We Say in Private
- 2021: One Hand on the Steering Wheel the Other Sewing a Garden
- 2025: When I Paint My Masterpiece

Singles and EPs

- "The Party" (2019)
- Woman, Here (2020)
- "Hurt" (2021)
- "Hometown / Heard You" (2023)
- Notes (2024)
- the end is a wave (2026)

Contributions

- WHY? – The Well I Fell Into (2024)
