= Palm (band) =

American band

- Origin: Philadelphia, Pennsylvania, U.S.
- Genres: Math rock; neo-psychedelia; post-punk
- Years active: 2012–2023
- Label: Carpark
- Spinoffs: Kassie Krut
- Past members: Eve Alpert; Kasra Kurt; Gerasimos Livitsanos; Hugo Stanley
- Website: palmnewyork.bandcamp.com

Palm was an American math rock band from Philadelphia. Palm was formed by songwriters, guitarists and vocalists Eve Alpert and Kasra Kurt, who recruited bass player Gerasimos Livitsanos and drummer Hugo Stanley while attending Bard College in New York.

Palm announced their breakup on 13 June 2023 via an Instagram post along with their final tour dates. Since then, Alpert and Kurt have created a new project, Kassie Krut, alongside longtime collaborator Matthew Anderegg.

Palm's music often features abrupt time changes and unconventional song structures, citing Deerhoof, This Heat, and DJ Rashad as influences. In a positive review of their Shadow Expert EP, Pitchfork referred to their dualing melodies and intertwined vocals as "constantly communicating in esoteric shorthand, often in several cross-talking conversations at once." The New York Times, which called the band "one of the most ambitious and promising acts in today’s art-rock scene," described Palm's music as "teeming with unorthodox time signatures, unexpected bursts of guitar noise, and other trapdoors and tricks." NPR described the band's songs as "jagged edges and complex, interlocking pieces ... that demands – and rewards – your full attention."

== Members ==
- Eve Alpert – guitar, vocals
- Kasra Kurt – guitar, vocals
- Gerasimos Livitsanos – bass
- Hugo Stanley – drums

== Discography ==
=== Studio albums ===
- Trading Basics (2015, Exploding in Sound, Inflated Records)
- Rock Island (2018, Carpark Records)
- Nicks and Grazes (2022, Saddle Creek Records)

=== Extended plays ===
- Ode to Scott (2013)
- Into the Bulk (2013)
- Samples (2014; re-release of Ode to Scott and Into the Bulk with one new song)
- Ostrich Vacation (2015)
- Shadow Expert (2017, Carpark Records)

=== Live album ===
- Audiotree Live (2016)
