= Euphemystic =

Studio album by Son, Ambulance
- Released: September 11, 2001
- Genre: Indie rock
- Length: 43:11
- Label: Saddle Creek

Son, Ambulance chronology
| Euphemystic (2001) | Key (2004) |

Professional ratings
Review scores
| Source | Rating |
|---|---|
| Allmusic | 1.5/5 stars |
| Pitchfork | (6.2/10) |
| PopMatters | |

Euphemystic is the first full-length album by American band Son, Ambulance.

It is the 36th release from Saddle Creek Records.

== Track listing ==
1. "An Instant Death" – 6:38
2. "An Instant Birth" – 2:55
3. "Seven Days" – 1:39
4. "A Book Laid On Its Binding" – 3:14
5. "Maria In Motion" – 5:13
6. "The Anonymous" – 4:20
7. "Like A Friend " – 4:55
8. "I Promise You'll Never Grow Old" – 5:12
9. "A New Dress For Maybell" – 4:16
10. "Violet" – 4:49
