= Broken Spindles =

American band

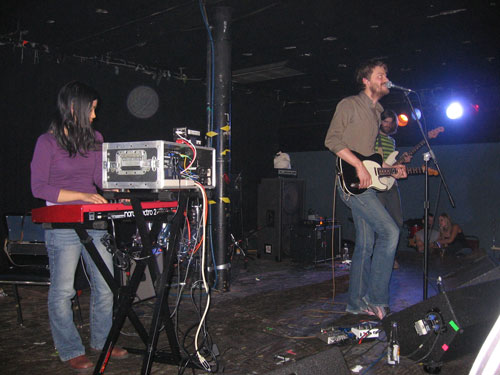

Background information
- Origin: Omaha, Nebraska, U.S.
- Genres: Indie rock; electronic; synth-pop; trip hop
- Years active: 2001–2011
- Label: Saddle Creek
- Past members: Joel Petersen

Broken Spindles was a band primarily consisting of Joel Petersen of Omaha, Nebraska, who also played bass, guitar and keyboards in the Faint. Petersen started the project in 2001 as the soundtrack for a friend's short film. Petersen originated much of the music for the band's recordings, but brought in other musicians for live concerts.

For the band's debut album, Petersen first created the songs on a computer, and then worked with Mike Mogis (who also produced several of The Faint's albums) to recreate the sounds with live instruments (mostly played by Mogis), including hammered dulcimer, glockenspiel, vibraphone, and electric guitar, in addition to Petersen's synthesizer.

Music created on a laptop can sound cold and sterile. It's a challenge to bring it to the real world and make it sound like real instruments. I figured the songs would have more depth if I replaced my sounds with music played by humans.

— Joel Petersen

Other musicians also performed on several of the other albums, such as fulfilled/complete (2004), which included live strings, and Kiss/Kick (2009), for which Petersen wanted an acoustic drummer so he could "get out of computer land".

The band's music ranged from instrumental electronic songs to sparse piano pieces to rock-influenced pop songs.

== Discography ==
=== Albums ===
- Broken Spindles (2002), Tiger Style
- fulfilled/complete (2004), Saddle Creek
- inside/absent (2005), Saddle Creek
- Document Number One (2008), self-released
- Kiss/Kick (2009), blank.wav

=== Compilation appearances ===
- "Move Away (Broken Spindles Remix)" on Lagniappe: A Saddle Creek Benefit for Hurricane Katrina (2005), Saddle Creek

=== Remixes ===
- Yo Gabba Gabba - "Summer Remix"
- Her Space Holiday - "My Girlfriend's Boyfriend"
- AFI - "Miss Murder"
- of Montreal - "Wraith Pinned to the Mist and Other Games"
- Good Charlotte - "Keep Your Hands Off My Girl"
- Manic - "Carolina Ghost"

== See also ==
- Beep Beep
- The Faint
