= Ladyfinger cactus =

Ladyfinger cactus may refer to:

- Mammillaria elongata, also known as the gold lace cactus, a species of cactus native to Central Mexico
- Echinocereus pentalophus, also known as alicoche or dog tail, a species of cactus native to North America
