= Beep Beep (band) =

American rock band

Beep Beep is a rock band from Omaha, Nebraska, on Saddle Creek Records. The band was formed in July 2001 by Eric Bemberger and Chris Hughes, formerly of Saddle Creek group Gabardine. Former member Joel Petersen plays bass in The Faint and also has his own electronica project, Broken Spindles. Their first album, Business Casual, was released August, 2004. A second album Enchanted Islands was released in March, 2009. Musical influences have included Arab on Radar, Six Finger Satellite, Kate Bush, and Orchestral Manoeuvres in the Dark.

== Band members ==
Current members:

- Eric Bemberger
- James Reilly
- Ian Francis
- Kyle Petersen

Former members:

- Javid Dabestani
- Chris Hughes (a.k.a. Chris Terry)
- Ben Armstrong
- AJ Mogis
- Joel Petersen
- Mike Sweeney
- Katie Muth
- Darren Keen

== Discography ==
- Business Casual (2004 · Saddle Creek Records)
- Enchanted Islands (2009 · Saddle Creek Records)
