= Saddle Creek Records =

American record label

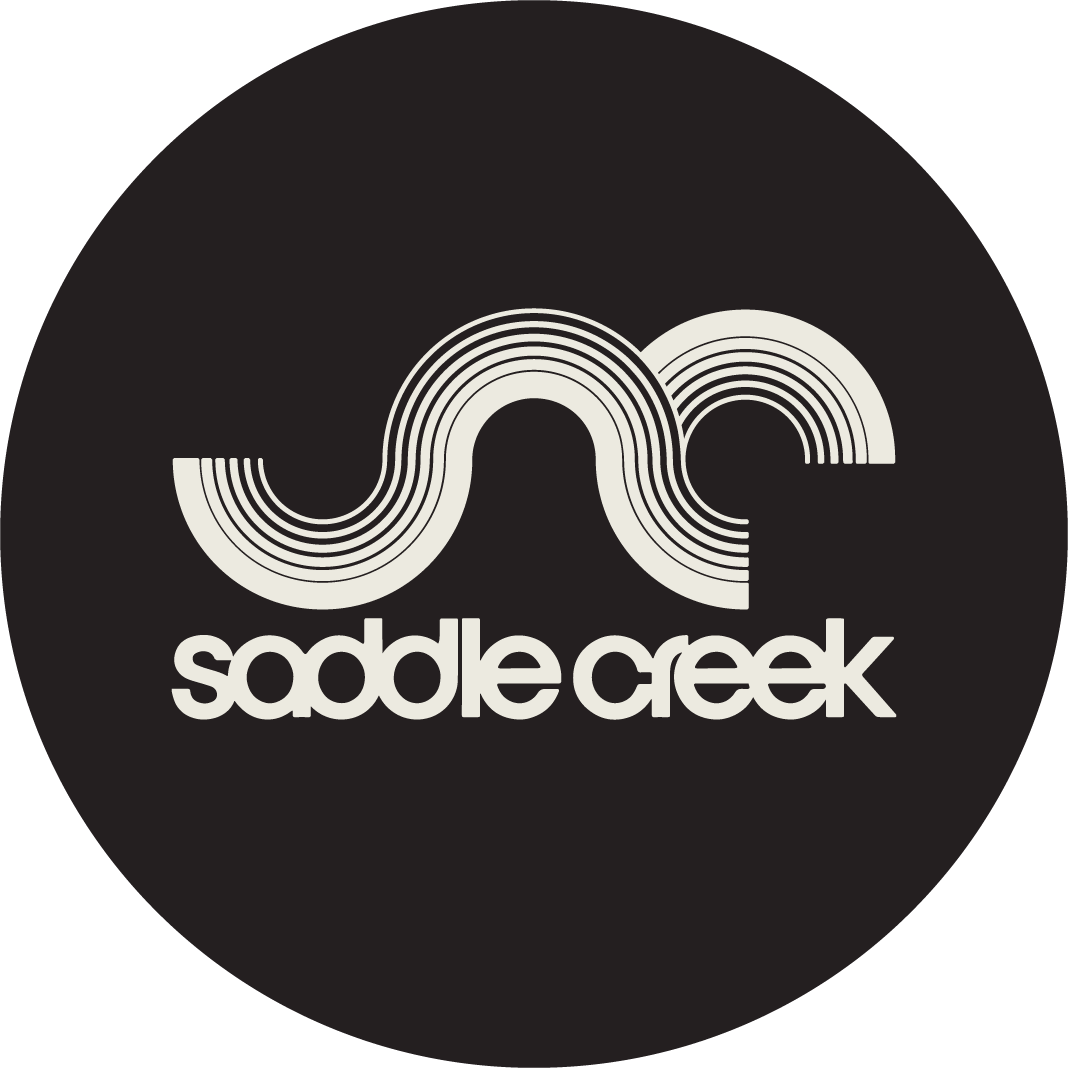
- Founded: 1993
- Founder: Mike Mogis; Justin Oberst
- Distributor: Redeye Distribution (US)
- Genre: Rock
- Country of origin: U.S.
- Location: Omaha, Nebraska
- Official website: saddle-creek.com

Saddle Creek Records is an American record label based in Omaha, Nebraska and named after Saddle Creek Road, a major street in midtown Omaha. Started as a college class project on entrepreneurship, the label was founded in 1993 by Mike Mogis and Justin Oberst. Mogis soon turned over his role in the company to Robb Nansel. It was initially called Lumberjack Records; Saddle Creek first appeared in print on a show flyer, offering to "Spend an evening with Saddle Creek" (later to be the title of the label's documentary). Distribution is handled by Redeye Distribution. SCR continues to be the flagship label of a style of music called "The Omaha Sound", characterized by a slight country twang. A "sister label" of sorts to Saddle Creek is Team Love, which was begun by Justin Oberst's brother Conor Oberst in 2004.

== History ==
The company was incorporated in 1993 as Lumberjack Records. It was started as part of a college class in entrepreneurship by Mike Mogis and Justin Oberst. Mogis was soon succeeded by Robb Nansel. The label's first release was "Water", a solo recording on cassette by Oberst's younger brother Conor Oberst, who was 13 years old at the time. When national distribution began in 1996, to avoid confusion with another distributor the name was changed to Saddle Creek Records, for Saddle Creek Road in Omaha. Artists who recorded for the label including Conor Oberst and Tim Kasher were at the time members of a local music scene centered on Saddle Creek Road whose members were known as "Creekers", and the label name was partly inspired by the A-side single of Polecat's 1994 -ismist Recordings release 2500 Ft of Our Love, "Saddle Creek".

Initially a local label, Saddle Creek opened its arms to non-Omaha bands in 2001 with releases by Now It's Overhead and Sorry About Dresden. Other artists not from Nebraska followed including Los Angeles' Rilo Kiley, Eric Bachmann (formerly the leader of Archers of Loaf from Chapel Hill, North Carolina and Crooked Fingers from North Carolina), Georgie James (Washington D.C.), Two Gallants (San Francisco), and most recently Tokyo Police Club (Toronto).

On June 8, 2007, the label opened their own music venue in downtown Omaha, named Slowdown after the group Slowdown Virginia.

== Documentary ==
Spend an Evening with Saddle Creek
- Directed by: Jason Kulbel; Rob Walters
- Starring: Bright Eyes; Cursive; The Faint; Azure Ray; Now It's Overhead; Son, Ambulance
- Edited by: Jason Kulbel; Rob Walters
- Distributed by: Plexifilm
- Release date: August 23, 2005 (U.S.)
- Running time: 160 minutes
- Country: United States
- Language: English

Spend an Evening with Saddle Creek is a documentary focusing on the first ten years of the Saddle Creek scene in Omaha, Nebraska. It was released in 2005 by Plexifilm. It was directed by Jason Kulbel and Rob Walters.

Interviews for the film were conducted in December 2003 and January 2004 with the active bands on the Saddle Creek roster at that time.

=== Bands featured ===
- Azure Ray
- Bright Eyes
- Cursive
- Desaparecidos
- The Faint
- The Good Life
- Mayday
- Now It's Overhead
- Rilo Kiley
- Son, Ambulance
- Sorry About Dresden

== Bands ==
=== Current ===
- Ada Lea
- Algernon Cadwallader
- Art in Manila
- Azure Ray
- Beep Beep
- Big Thief
- Black Belt Eagle Scout
- Bright Eyes
- Criteria
- Cursive
- Desaparecidos
- Disq
- Feeble Little Horse
- Hop Along
- The Good Life
- Icky Blossoms
- Indigo De Souza
- Ladyfinger (ne)
- Eastern Youth
- Eric Bachmann
- Land of Talk
- Maria Taylor
- Mayday
- Miles Benjamin Anthony Robinson
- The Mynabirds
- Neva Dinova
- Now It's Overhead
- Old Canes
- Orenda Fink
- Palm
- The Rural Alberta Advantage
- Sebastien Grainger
- Sam Evian
- Shalom
- Son, Ambulance
- Sorry About Dresden
- The Spirit of the Beehive
- Stef Chura
- Tim Kasher
- Tokyo Police Club
- Tomberlin
- Twinsmith
- Young Jesus

=== Former ===
- Broken Spindles
- Commander Venus
- The Faint
- Gabardine
- Georgie James
- Park Ave.
- Polecat
- PUJOL
- Rilo Kiley
- Slowdown Virginia
- The Thermals
- Two Gallants
- We'd Rather Be Flying

== Discography ==
All releases marked either LBJ (Lumberjack) or SCE (Saddle Creek Europe)

Year	No.	Artist	Title	Format
1993	LBJ-01	Conor Oberst	Water	CS
1993	LBJ-02	Polecat	Dilly Dally	CS
1994	LBJ-03	Slowdown Virginia	Dead Space	CD
1995	LBJ-04	Smashmouth	Some of You Will Be Hermits	CS
1995	LBJ-05	Polecat/Sunbrain	Happy Valentine's Day/Makeout Party	Split 7-inch
1995	LBJ-06	Commander Venus	Do You Feel at Home?	CD
1995	LBJ-07	We'd Rather Be Flying	The Solution for Your Thinning Hair	CD
1995	LBJ-08	Norman Bailer	Sine Sierra	CS
1996	LBJ-09	Various	Music Me All Over	7-inch
1996	LBJ-10	Cursive	The Disruption	CDr, 7-inch
1996	LBJ-11	Lullaby for the Working Class	Consolation	7-inch
1996	LBJ-12	Lullaby for the Working Class	Blanket Warm	LP
1996	LBJ-13	Drip/Commander Venus	Last Go/Bow to the Prom King	Split 7-inch
1997	LBJ-14	The Wrens/Park Ave.	Split Single	Split 7-inch
1997	LBJ-15	Lullaby for the Working Class	...In Honor of My Stumbling	7-inch
1997	LBJ-16	comm.venus*	The Uneventful Vacation	LP
1997	LBJ-17	Lullaby for the Working Class	I Never Even Asked for Light	LP
1997	LBJ-18	Cursive	The Icebreaker	7-inch EP
1998	LBJ-19	Bright Eyes	A Collection of Songs Written and Recorded 1995–1997	LP
1997	LBJ-20	Various	A Sampler CD	CD
1998	LBJ-21	The Faint	Media	CD
1998	LBJ-22	Cursive	The Storms of Early Summer: Semantics of Song	CD
1998	LBJ-23	Bright Eyes	Letting Off the Happiness	CD/LP
1999	LBJ-24	Lullaby for the Working Class	The Ebb & Flow, the Come Go, the To & Fro	7-inch
1999	LBJ-25	The Faint/Ex-Action Figures	split	Split 7-inch
1999	LBJ-26	Gabardine	Gabardine	CD
1999	LBJ-27	Lullaby for the Working Class	Song	LP
1999	LBJ-28	The Faint	Blank-Wave Arcade	LP
1999	LBJ-29	Spoon	The Agony of Laffitte	CD Single
1999	LBJ-30	Bright Eyes	Every Day and Every Night	EP CD/12"
2000	LBJ-31	Cursive	Domestica	CD/LP
2000	LBJ-32	Bright Eyes	Fevers and Mirrors	CD/LP
2000	LBJ-33	The Faint	Blank-Wave Arcade Remixes	12-inch

- LBJ-034 Bright Eyes/Son, Ambulance - Oh Holy Fools: The Music of Son, Ambulance & Bright Eyes CD/LP
- LBJ-035 Cursive - Burst and Bloom CD/LP
- LBJ-036 Son, Ambulance - Euphemystic CD/LP
- LBJ-037 The Faint - Danse Macabre CD/LP
- LBJ-038 Now It's Overhead - Now It's Overhead CD/LP
- LBJ-039 Sorry About Dresden - The Convenience of Indecision CD
- LBJ-040 Desaparecidos - The Happiest Place on Earth CD5
- LBJ-041 Azure Ray - November EP CD
- LBJ-042 Desaparecidos - Read Music/Speak Spanish CD/LP
- LBJ-043 The Good Life - Black Out CD/LP
- LBJ-044 Mayday - Old Blood CD
- LBJ-045 Bright Eyes - There Is No Beginning To The Story EP CD/12"
- LBJ-046 Bright Eyes - Lifted or The Story Is in the Soil, Keep Your Ear to the Ground CD/2×LP
- LBJ-047 Rilo Kiley - The Execution of All Things CD/LP
- LBJ-048 Bright Eyes - A Christmas Album CD
- LBJ-049 Cursive - Art Is Hard CD
- LBJ-050 Various Artists - Saddle Creek 50 2×CD/LP
- LBJ-051 Cursive - The Ugly Organ CD/LP
- LBJ-052 Sorry About Dresden - Let It Rest CD
- LBJ-053 Bright Eyes - Vinyl Box Set 5×LP + 2x12" + box set
- LBJ-054 Azure Ray - Hold On Love CD/LP
- LBJ-055 Azure Ray - The Drinks We Drank Last Night CD
- SCE-056 Rilo Kiley - The Execution of All Things CD
- LBJ-057 Azure Ray - New Resolution CD
- LBJ-058 Now It's Overhead - Fall Back Open CD
- LBJ-059 Cursive - The Recluse CD
- SCE-060 Bright Eyes/Neva Dinova - One Jug of Wine, Two Vessels CD/LP
- LBJ-061 Broken Spindles - fulfilled/complete CD/LP
- LBJ-062 The Good Life - Lovers Need Lawyers CD/10"
- LBJ-063 Beep Beep - Business Casual CD/LP
- LBJ-064 The Good Life - Album of the Year CD/LP
- LBJ-065 Now It's Overhead - Wait in a Line CD
- LBJ-066 The Faint - I Disappear CD
- LBJ-067 The Faint - Wet From Birth CD/LP
- LBJ-068 Bright Eyes - Lua CD
- LBJ-069 Bright Eyes - Take It Easy (Love Nothing) CD
- LBJ-070 Cursive - The Difference Between Houses and Homes CD/LP
- LBJ-071 Son, Ambulance - Key CD
- LBJ-072 Bright Eyes - I'm Wide Awake, It's Morning CD/LP
- LBJ-073 Bright Eyes - Digital Ash in a Digital Urn CD/LP
- LBJ-074 Maria Taylor - 11:11 CD
- LBJ-075 Orenda Fink - Invisible Ones CD
- LBJ-076 Mayday - Bushido Karaoke CD
- LBJ-077 Bright Eyes - When the President Talks to God iTunes exclusive
- LBJ-078 unassigned
- SCE-079 Bright Eyes - First Day of My Life CD/7"
- LBJ-080 Criteria - En Garde (reissue) CD
- LBJ-081 Criteria - When We Break CD/LP
- LBJ-082 Broken Spindles - inside/absent CD/LP
- LBJ-083 The Faint - Desperate Guys CD
- LBJ-084 Bright Eyes - Easy/Lucky/Free CD/2×7″
- LBJ-085 Criteria - Prevent the World CD
- LBJ-086 Orenda Fink - Bloodline iTunes single
- LBJ-087 Various Artists - Lagniappe
- SCE-088 Bright Eyes - Motion Sickness: Live Recordings CD
- LBJ-089 Saddle Up and Love It - Saddle Creek/Lovitt Records Hot Topic Compilation CD
- LBJ-090 Two Gallants - Las Cruces Jail 7-inch
- LBJ-091 Two Gallants - What the Toll Tells CD/LP
- SCE-092 Two Gallants - Steady Rollin' iTunes Exclusive
- LBJ-093 Cursive - Dorothy at Forty CD/7"
- LBJ-094 Cursive - Happy Hollow CD/LP
- LBJ-095 Eric Bachmann - To The Races CD
- LBJ-096 Now It's Overhead - Dark Light Daybreak (Live in the Studio) iTunes Exclusive
- LBJ-097 Now It's Overhead - Dark Light Daybreak CD
- LBJ-098 Ladyfinger - Heavy Hands CD
- LBJ-099 Bright Eyes - Noise Floor: Rarities 1998-2005 CD, 2*LP
- LBJ-101 Bright Eyes - Four Winds CD/12"
- LBJ-102 Maria Taylor - Lynn Teeter Flower CD
- LBJ-103 Bright Eyes - Cassadaga CD/2×LP
- SCE-104 Cursive - Big Bang digital single
- LBJ-105 Two Gallants - The Scenery of Farewell CD/12"
- LBJ-106 The Good Life - Heartbroke 7-inch/Digital Single
- LBJ-107 Art in Manila - Set the Woods on Fire CD
- LBJ-108 The Good Life - Help Wanted Nights CD/LP
- LBJ-109 Two Gallants - Two Gallants CD/LP
- LBJ-110 Georgie James - Places CD/LP
- SCE-111 Two Gallants - Despite What You've Been Told Digital Single
- SCE-112 Georgie James - Need Your Needs Digital Single
- SCE-113 Richard Swift - Dressed Up for the Letdown CD
- LBJ-114 Cursive - Rhapsody Original EP Digital
- LBJ-115 Cursive - Bad Sects 12-inch
- LBJ-116 Tokyo Police Club - Elephant Shell CD/LP
- LBJ-117 Neva Dinova - You May Already Be Dreaming CD/LP
- LBJ-118 Georgie James - Cake Parade 7-inch/Digital
- LBJ-119 Tokyo Police Club - Elephant Shell (Remixes) Digital
- LBJ-120 Son, Ambulance - Someone Else's Deja Vu CD/LP
- LBJ-121 Tokyo Police Club - Tessellate 7-inch
- SCE-122 Two Gallants - Miss Meri Digital Single
- LBJ-123 Beep Beep - Enchanted Islands CD
- LBJ-124 Neva Dinova - Neva Dinova (2009 Reissue) Digital
- LBJ-125 O+S - O+S CD/LP
- LBJ-126 Land of Talk - Some Are Lakes CD/LP
- LBJ-127 Sebastien Grainger - American Names 7-inch/Digital EP
- LBJ-128 Sebastien Grainger - Sebastien Grainger & The Mountains CD/LP
- LBJ-129 Ladyfinger (ne) - Dusk CD
- LBJ-130 Tokyo Police Club - FNMTV Live (Rhapsody Exclusive)
- LBJ-131 Tokyo Police Club - Live Session iTunes Exclusive EP
- LBJ-132 Cursive - Mama, I'm Swollen CD/LP
- LBJ-133 Cursive/Ladyfinger (ne) - Record Store Day Picture 10-inch
- LBJ-134 Sebastien Grainger - Who Do We Care For Digital Single
- LBJ-135 Tokyo Police Club - Baskervilles Remix Digital Single
- SCE-136 Dag för Dag - Shooting from the Shadows CD EP
- LBJ-137 UUVVWWZ - UUVVWWZ CD
- LBJ-138 The Rural Alberta Advantage - Hometowns CD/LP
- LBJ-139 Orenda Fink - Ask The Night CD/LP
- LBJ-140 Old Canes - Feral Harmonic CD/LP
- LBJ-141 O+S - We Do What We Want to Digital
- LBJ-142 Miles Benjamin Anthony Robinson - Summer of Fear CD/LP/Digital
- LBJ-143 Land of Talk - Fun & Laughter EP CD/Digital
- LBJ-144 The Rural Alberta Advantage - Drain the Blood 7-inch/Digital
- LBJ-145 Bright Eyes / Neva Dinova - One Jug of Wine, Two Vessels CD/LP/Digital (2010 Reissue)
- LBJ-146 The Mynabirds - What We Lose in the Fire We Gain in the Flood CD/LP/Digital
- LBJ-147 Azure Ray - Drawing Down the Moon - CD/LP/Digital
- LBJ-148 Cursive - Discovering America Digital Single
- LBJ-149 Land of Talk - Cloak and Cipher CD/LP/Digital
- LBJ-150 Land of Talk - Swift Coin 7-inch/Digital
- LBJ-151 Tim Kasher - Cold Love 7-inch/Digital
- LBJ-152 Tim Kasher - The Game of Monogamy CD/LP/Digital
- LBJ-153 Adam Haworth Stephens - We Live on Cliffs CD/LP/Digital
- LBJ-154 Azure Ray - Don't Leave My Mind Digital Single
- LBJ-155 Tim Kasher - Delirium Tantrums 7-inch (online-store exclusive)
- LBJ-156 The Mynabirds - All I Want is Truth (for Christmas) 7-inch/Digital
- LBJ-157 The Rural Alberta Advantage - Departing CD/LP/Digital
- LBJ-158 Bright Eyes - The People's Key CD/LP/Digital
- LBJ-159 Bright Eyes - Singularity Digital
- LBJ-160 Azure Ray (feat. Sparklehorse) - Silverlake Digital
- LBJ-161 Big Harp - White Hat - CD/LP/Digital
- LBJ-162 Maria Taylor - Overlook - CD/LP/Digital
- LBJ-163 Maria Taylor - In A Bad Way - CD/Digital
- LBJ-164 Various Artists - Saddle Creek Spring 2011 Sampler - CD/Digital
- LBJ-165 PUJOL - Nasty, Brutish, and Short EP - CD/10"/Digital
- LBJ-166 Tim Kasher - Bigamy: More Songs from the Monogamy Sessions - CD/LP/Digital
- LBJ-167 Tim Kasher - The Game of Monogamy with Bigamy: More Songs from the Monogamy Sessions - Digital
- LBJ-168 Cursive - I Am Gemini - CD/LP/Digital
- LBJ-169 Cursive - The Sun and Moon / The Cat and Mouse - 10"/Digital
- LBJ-170 The Mynabirds - GENERALS - CD/LP/Digital
- LBJ-171 PUJOL - United States of Being - CD/LP/Digital
- LBJ-172 Icky Blossoms - Icky Blossoms - CD/LP/Digital
- LBJ-173 The Mynabirds - Generals - 7"/Digital
- LBJ-174 PUJOL - Reverse Vampire 7"/Digital
- LBJ-175 Icky Blossoms - Babes 7"/Digital
- LBJ-176 Azure Ray - As Above So Below - CD/12"/Digital
- LBJ-177 Ladyfinger - Errant Forms - LP/Digital
- LBJ-178 Icky Blossoms - Village 7"
- LBJ-179 UUVVWWZ - the trusted language - LP/Digital
- LBJ-180 The Faint - Danse Macabre (Deluxe Edition) [Remastered] - CD/LP/Digital
- LBJ-181 Big Harp - Chain Letters - CD/LP/Digital
- LBJ-182 O+S - Flowers Turn to Fire - Digital
- LBJ-183 The Mynabirds - Body of Work - 7"/Digital
- LBJ-184 2012 Saddle Creek Sampler - CD/Digital
- LBJ-185 Cursive - The Ugly Organ (Deluxe Edition) [Remastered] - CD/LP/Digital
- LBJ-186 The Thermals - Desperate Ground - CD/LP/Digital
- LBJ-187 O+S - Flowers Turn To Fire - 7"
- LBJ-188 PUJOL - DEEP CUTS - 7"
- LBJ-189 The Thermals - Desperate Ground Demos - 7"
- LBJ-190 Black Lips/Icky Blossoms - Cowboy Knights - 7"
- LBJ-191 Maria Taylor - Something About Knowing - CD/LP/Digital
- LBJ-192 Icky Blossoms - Revisions - Digital
- LBJ-193 The Mynabirds - GENERALS: REMIXED - 12"/Digital
- LBJ-194 Icky Blossoms - Icky Blossoms (Deluxe Edition) Digital
- LBJ-195 Various Artists - Saddle Creek Spring 2013 Sampler - CD/Digital
- LBJ-196 Jake Bellows - New Ocean - CD/LP/Digital
- LBJ-197 Neva Dinova - The Hate Yourself Change - Digital
- LBJ-198 Tim Kasher - Adult Film - CD/LP/Digital
- LBJ-199 Bright Eyes - A Christmas Album (Reissue) - CD/LP/Digital
- LBJ-200 unassigned
- LBJ-201 Tim Kasher - Truly Freaking Out - 7"/Digital
- LBJ-202 Tim Kasher - Fragile Bipedal - 7"
- LBJ-203 Twinsmith - Honestly - 7"/Digital
- LBJ-204 PUJOL - KLUDGE - CD/LP/Digital
- LBJ-205 PUJOL - CIRCLES - 7"/Digital
- LBJ-206 Orenda Fink - Blue Dream - CD/LP/Digital
- LBJ-207 The Rural Alberta Advantage - Mended With Gold - CD/LP/Digital
- LBJ-208 The Good Life - Novena on a Nocturn - LP
- LBJ-209 The Good Life - Novena on a Nocturn Demos - LP
- LBJ-210 The Good Life - Album of the Year Demos - LP
- LBJ-211 Orenda Fink - You Can Be Loved - Digital
- LBJ-212 The Rural Alberta Advantage - Terrified - Flexi disc
- LBJ-213 PUJOL - Reunited States of Being - Cassette/Digital
- LBJ-214 Orenda Fink - Ace of Cups - Digital
- LBJ-215 Twinsmith - Alligator Years - CD/LP/Digital
- LBJ-216 Tim Kasher & Chris Farren - You Be Me For A While - Split 7"
- LBJ-217 Icky Blossoms - Mask - CD/LP/Digital
- LBJ-218 Hop Along - Painted Shut - CD/LP/Tape/Digital
- LBJ-219 Icky Blossoms - Living in Fiction - 7"
- LBJ-220 The Mynabirds - Lovers Know - CD/LP/Digital
- LBJ-221 The Good Life - Everybody's Coming Down - CD/LP/Digital
- LBJ-222 Hop Along - Get Disowned (Reissue) - CD/LP/Tape/Digital
- LBJ-223 Orenda Fink - Mighty Mist - Digital
- LBJ-224 The Good Life - Everybody - Flexi disc
- LBJ-225 The Thermals - We Disappear - CD/LP/Digital
- LBJ-226 unassigned
- LBJ-227 O+S - You Were Once the Sun, Now You're the Moon - LP/Digital
- LBJ-228 The Mynabirds - Chelsea Hotel No. 2 - Digital
- LBJ-229 Sam Evian - Need You - Digital
- LBJ-230 The Mynabirds - Leonora - Digital
- LBJ-231 Cho-Cho & Dasheen - Cool Pool Reggae - 7"/Digital
- LBJ-232 The Thermals - Hey You - 7"/Digital
- LBJ-233 Big Thief - Masterpiece - CD/LP/Tape/Digital
- LBJ-234 Big Thief - Masterpiece single - Flexi disc
- LBJ-235 Bright Eyes - Fevers and Mirrors (Remastered) - CD/LP/Tape/Digital
- LBJ-236 Bright Eyes - LIFTED or... (Remastered) - CD/LP/Tape/Digital
- LBJ-237 Bright Eyes - I'm Wide Awake, It's Morning (Remastered) - CD/LP/Tape/Digital
- LBJ-238 Bright Eyes - Digital Ash in a Digital Urn (Remastered) - CD/LP/Tape/Digital
- LBJ-239 Bright Eyes - Cassadaga (Remastered) - CD/LP/Tape/Digital
- LBJ-240 Bright Eyes - The Studio Albums 2000–2011 - CD/LP/Digital
- LBJ-241 Sam Evian - Premium - CD/LP/Digital
- LBJ-242 Sam Evian - Sleep Easy - 7"/Digital
- LBJ-243 Posse - Kismet - 7"/Digital
- LBJ-244 Big Thief - Dandelion - 7"/Digital
- LBJ-245 The Faint - CAPSULE:1999–2016 - CD/LP/Digital
- LBJ-246 The Faint - Fasciinatiion - CD/LP/Digital
- LBJ-247 The Faint - Doom Abuse - CD/LP/Digital
- LBJ-248 The Faint - Young & Realistic - CD/LP/Digital
- LBJ-249 The Good Life - The Modern Mary - Digital
- LBJ-250 Laura Burhenn - Apples & Oranges - Digital
- LBJ-251 The Good Life - Are You Afraid of Dying? - Digital
- LBJ-252 The Rural Alberta Advantage - White Lights - Digital
- LBJ-253 Sam Evian - Snow - Amazon digital single
- LBJ-254 Big Thief - Mythological Beauty - 7"/Digital
- LBJ-255 Big Thief - Capacity - CD/LP/Tape/Digital
- LBJ-256 The Rural Alberta Advantage - Beacon Hill - Digital
- LBJ-257 Twinsmith - Stay Cool - LP/Digital
- LBJ-258 Land Of Talk - Life After Youth - CD/LP/Tape/Digital
- LBJ-259 Wilder Maker - New Streets - 7"/Digital
- LBJ-260 The Rural Alberta Advantage - The Wild CD/LP/Digital
- LBJ-261 The Mynabirds - BE HERE NOW - LP/Digital
- LBJ-262 Hand Habits - yr heart - 7"/Digital
- LBJ-263 Hop Along - Bark Your Head Off, Dog - CD/LP/Tape/Digital
- LBJ-264 Bright Eyes - Coyote Song - Digital
- LBJ-265 Sam Evian - You, Forever - CD/LP/Digital
- LBJ-266 Palehound - YMCA Pool - 7"/Digital
- LBJ-267 The Rural Alberta Advantage - Brother - Digital
- LBJ-268 The Mynabirds - BE HERE NOW: Behind The Album - Digital
- LBJ-269 The Rural Alberta Advantage - Toughen Up - Digital
- LBJ-270 Stef Chura - Messes - CD/LP/Tape/Digital
- LBJ-271 Stef Chura - Midnight - CD/LP/Tape/Digital
- LBJ-272 Young Jesus - S/T - CD/LP/Tape/Digital
- LBJ-273 Young Jesus - The Whole Thing Is Just There - CD/LP/Digital
- LBJ-274 Stef Chura - Degrees b/w Sour Honey - 7"/Digital
- LBJ-275 Adrianne Lenker - abysskiss - CD/LP/Digital
- LBJ-276 Tomberlin - At Weddings - CD/LP/Tape/Digital
- LBJ-278 Hovvdy - Easy/Turns Blue - 7"/Digital
- LBJ-279 The Faint - Egowerk - CD/LP/Digital
- LBJ-280 Black Belt Eagle Scout - Mother of My Children - CD/LP/Digital
- LBJ-281 Adrianne Lenker & Buck Meek - a-sides and b-sides - CD/LP
- LBJ-282 Adrianne Lenker - Hours Were the Birds - CD/LP/Digital
- LBJ-283 Land of Talk - Indistinct Conversations - CD/LP/Tape/Digital
- LBJ-284 Sam Evian - Aquarium Drunkard’s Lagniappe Session - Digital
- LBJ-285 Adrianne Lenker & Buck Meek - a-sides - Digital
- LBJ-286 Adrianne Lenker & Buck Meek - b-sides - Digital
- LBJ-287 Adrianne Lenker - Demos (Rough Trade Exclusive) - CD
- LBJ-288 Disq - Communication b/w Parallel - 7"/Digital
- LBJ-289 Sam Evian - Next to You (feat. Kazu Makino) - Digital
- LBJ-290 The Faint - Danse Macabre (Remastered) - LP
- LBJ-291 Hand Habits - placeholder - CD/LP/Digital
- LBJ-292 Outer Spaces - Teapot #1 b/w Children Love to Run - 7"/Digital
- LBJ-293 Black Belt Eagle Scout - Loss & Relax b/w Half Colored Hair - 7"/Digital
- LBJ-294 Sam Evian - Cherry Tree b/w Roses - 7"/Digital
- LBJ-295 Treadles - Cold b/w Iron - 7"/Digital
- LBJ-296 Ada Lea - what we say in private - CD/LP/Tape/Digital
- LBJ-297 Black Belt Eagle Scout - At the Party With My Brown Friends - CD/LP/Tape/Digital
- LBJ-298 Frances Quinlan - Likewise - CD/LP/Tape/Digital
- LBJ-299 Disq - Collector - CD/LP/Tape/Digital
- LBJ-300 Ada Lea - the party (french version) - Digital
- LBJ-301 Sam Evian - Right Down the Line - Digital
- LBJ-302 McKinley Dixon - Anansi, Anansi b/w Wit These - 7"/Digital
- LBJ-303 Young Jesus - Welcome to Conceptual Beach - LP/CD/Digital
- LBJ-304 S. Raekwon - Parts Towards Whole b/w A Crow's Smile - 7"/Digital
- LBJ-305 The Big Net - Big Moon b/w Rufus - 7"/Digital
- LBJ-306 Ada Lea - one hand on the steering wheel the other sewing a garden LP/CD/Tape/Digital
- LBJ-307 Ada Lea - woman, here - Digital
- LBJ-308 Adam Cayton-Holland - Adam Cayton-Holland Performs His Signature Bits - LP
- LBJ-309 Hand Habits - wildfire covers - LP/Digital (Bandcamp Exclusive)
- LBJ-310 Stef Chura - How to Rent a Room - Digital
- LBJ-311 311 - Dammit! - Cassette (Limited Edition of 311)
- LBJ-312 Tomberlin - Projections - Picture Disc/Digital
- LBJ-313 Divide and Dissolve - TFW - 7"/Digital
- LBJ-314 Quarter-Life Crisis - Quarter-Life Crisis EP - 12"/Digital
- LBJ-315 Crake - Enough Salt (For All Dogs) b/w Gef - 7"/Digital
- LBJ-316 Disq - I Know What It's Like- Digital
- LBJ-317 Mal Blum - Nobody Waits b/w San Cristóbal - 7"/Digital
- LBJ-318 Indigo De Souza - Any Shape You Take - CD/LP/Tape/Digital
- LBJ-319 Neva Dinova - Demos and C-Sides LP/Digital
- LBJ-320 unassigned
- LBJ-321 Ohtis - Schatze b/w Failure - 7"/Digital
- LBJ-322 SPIRIT OF THE BEEHIVE - ENTERTAINMENT, DEATH - CD/LP/Tape/Digital
- LBJ-323 Hand Habits - Dirt - 7"/Digital
- LBJ-324 Tomberlin - Hours (draag me Remix) - Digital
- LBJ-325 Tomberlin - Hours (Katie Dey Remix) - Digital
- LBJ-326 Hand Habits - Fun House - LP/CD/Tape/Digital
- LBJ-327 Marcey Yates & XOBOI - Culxr House:Freedom Summer - LP/Digital
- LBJ-328 Indigo De Souza - I Love My Mom - CD/LP/Digital
- LBJ-329 Frances Quinlan - Likewise Remixes - Digital
- LBJ-330 PENDANT - Harp - CD/LP/Tape/Digital
- LBJ-331 allie - cast iron // infinite jesters - 7"/Digital
- LBJ-332 SPIRIT OF THE BEEHIVE - THE DOOR - 7"/Digital
- LBJ-333 Disq - Desperately Imagining Someplace Quiet CD/LP/Tape/Digital
- LBJ-334 Disq - Gentle (draag me Remix) - Digital
- LBJ-335 PENDANT - Blood Rite - Digital
- LBJ-336 Lonely Pirate Committee - He Was in the Father b/w ODE - 7"/Digital
- LBJ-337 SPIRIT OF THE BEEHIVE - IT MIGHT TAKE SOME TIME (Avey Tare Remix)
- LBJ-338 Land of Talk - Calming Night Partner - Digital EP - Digital
- LBJ-339 Black Belt Eagle Scout - the land, the water, the sky LP
- LBJ-340 Desaparecidos - What’s New for Fall b/w Give me the Pen 7”
- LBJ-341 unassigned
- LBJ-342 Desaparecidos - Read Music/Speak Spanish (Remastered) - CD/LP/Digital
- LBJ-343 Sorry About Dresden - Ghost (Is Leaving Me) - Digital
- LBJ-344 unassigned
- LBJ-345 Indigo De Souza - Ivy (Frank Ocean) - Digital
- LBJ-346 Young Jesus - Shepherd Head LP/CD/Tape/Digital
- LBJ-347 unassigned
- LBJ-348 unassigned
- LBJ-349 unassigned
- LBJ-350 The Rural Alberta Advantage - CANDU ::: AB Bride - Digital
- LBJ-351 Palm - Nicks and Grazes LP/CD/Tape/Digital
- LBJ-352 Shalom - Sublimation LP/CD/Tape/Digital
- LBJ-353 unassigned
- LBJ-354 Indigo De Souza - All of This Will End LP/CD/Tape/Digital
- LBJ-355 SPIRIT OF THE BEEHIVE - I SUCK THE DEVIL'S COCK (Nmesh's Electric Ego Death Quadrathlon) - Digital
- LBJ-356 The Rural Alberta Advantage - The Rise - Digital
- LBJ-357 The Rural Alberta Advantage - Plague Dogs - Digital
- LBJ-358 The Rural Alberta Advantage - The Rise & The Fall LP/CD/Digital
- LBJ-359 Shalom - Bad To The Bone / Agnes - Digital
- LBJ-360 Shalom - DTAP / True Love - Digital
- LBJ-361 unassigned
- LBJ-362 Hand Habits - Fun House: Blueprints - Digital
- LBJ-363 feeble little horse - Hayday (Reissue) - LP/CD/Digital
- LBJ-364 PENDANT - Caustic Pop Remixes - Digital
- LBJ-365 feeble little horse - Girl with Fish - LP/CD/Tape/Digital
- LBJ-366 claire rousay - Sigh In My Ear - 7"/Digital
- LBJ-367 Ada Lea - hometown / heard you - Digital
- LBJ-368 Hand Habits - Fun House + Blueprints - Digital
- LBJ-370 Land of Talk - Performances - LP/CD/Digital
- LBJ-372 Bedlocked|Teethe - All Over Again b/w Moon - 7"/Digital
- LBJ-373 SPIRIT OF THE BEEHIVE - i'm so lucky EP - 7"/Digital
- LBJ-374 Neva Dinova - Something's Out There - Digital
- LBJ-375 Indigo De Souza - Cassette Box Set 2018–2023 - Tape
- LBJ-376 Young Jesus - The Weasel - Digital
- LBJ-377 Neva Dinova - Something's Out There (Todd Fink Remix) - Digital
- LBJ-378 PENDANT - PCM - Digital

== Compilations ==
- Saddle Creek Records, A Sampler (1998)
- Saddle Creek 50 (2002)
- Lagniappe: A Saddle Creek Benefit for Hurricane Katrina (2005)

== See also ==
- List of record labels
- Team Love Records
- Range Life Records
- Lightspeed Champion
