= The Game of Monogamy =

Studio album by Tim Kasher
- Released: October 5, 2010
- Genre: Indie rock, Alternative rock
- Length: 37:53
- Label: Saddle Creek
- Producer: Tim Kasher

Professional ratings
Review scores
Source	Rating
Consequence of Sound	4/5 stars
Indie Rock Reviews	(8.6/10)
Pitchfork	(6.6/10)
SPIN	7/10 stars
Sputnikmusic	2/5 stars

The Game of Monogamy is the first solo album by Cursive and The Good Life frontman Tim Kasher. It was released on 5 October 2010 in the UK.

The album features musical assistance from members of Cursive and Minus the Bear.

== Track listing ==
1. "Monogamy Overture" - 1:54
2. "A Grown Man" - 2:01
3. "I'm Afraid I'm Gonna Die Here" - 4:50
4. "Strays" - 4:53
5. "Cold Love" - 2:47
6. "Surprise, Surprise" - 1:04
7. "There Must Be Something I've Lost" - 4:57
8. "Bad, Bad Dreams" - 2:56
9. "No Fireworks" - 4:07
10. "The Prodigal Husband" - 3:13
11. "Monogamy" - 5:17
