= Tomberlin =

American singer-songwriter

Sarah Beth Tomberlin
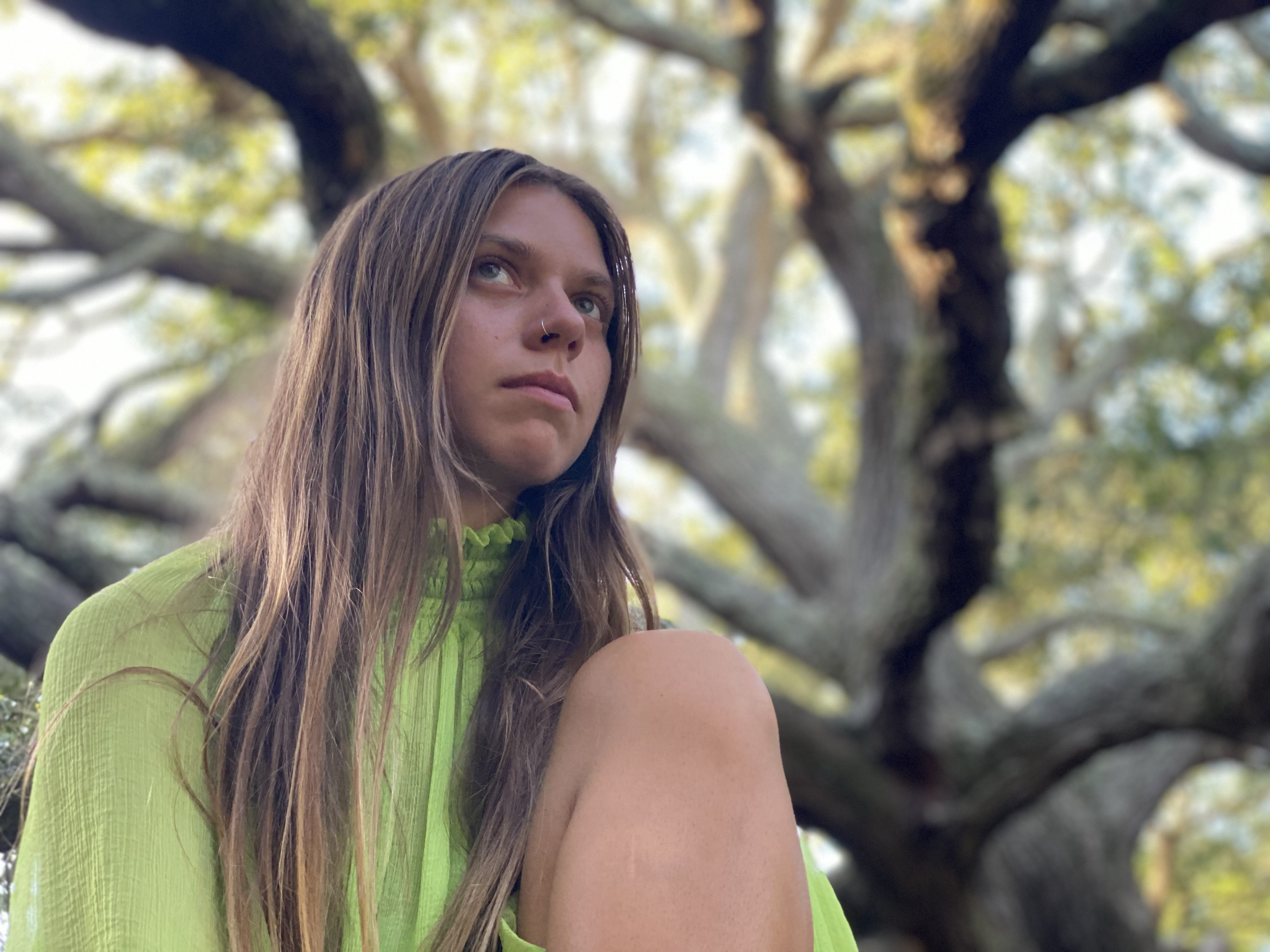
- Tomberlin in 2020

Background information
- Born: Sarah Beth Tomberlin; April 6, 1995 (age 31); Jacksonville, Florida
- Origin: Louisville, Kentucky, U.S.
- Genres: Indie folk; contemporary folk; pop rock
- Occupations: Musician; singer-songwriter
- Instruments: Vocals; guitar
- Years active: 2018–present
- Label: Saddle Creek
- Website: tomberlinmusic.com

Sarah Beth Tomberlin (born April 6, 1995), known mononymously as Tomberlin, is an American contemporary folk musician and singer-songwriter based in Louisville, Kentucky.

== Early life ==
Tomberlin was born in Jacksonville, Florida, but moved five different times before her family ended up residing in Fairfield, Illinois, where her father became a preacher at a local Baptist church. At age 16, Tomberlin finished high school and attended college for a short period before dropping out, at which point she began writing songs for her first album.

== Career ==
Tomberlin released her debut studio album in 2018 on Saddle Creek Records, titled At Weddings. The album was positively received by numerous publications. Her song titled “Any Other Way” was included on Season 1 of the Netflix show “Heartstopper.” On August 18, 2020, she announced a new EP called Projections, due out October 16, 2020, alongside the release of a Busy Philipps-directed music video for the song "Wasted".

In February 2022, Tomberlin announced her second studio album titled i don't know who needs to hear this..., which was released on April 29, 2022. The album was met with critical acclaim upon its release.

Tomberlin was the opening performer for the UK and EU dates of Angel Olsen's Big Time tour in late 2022.

== Influences ==
Growing up, the first albums that Tomberlin owned were the soundtrack to the musical film Chicago (2002), Dashboard Confessional's The Places You Have Come to Fear the Most (2001), and Bright Eyes's I'm Wide Awake, It's Morning (2005).

== Discography ==
=== Studio albums ===
- At Weddings (2018)
- I Don't Know Who Needs to Hear This... (2022)

=== EPs ===
- Projections (2020)
- Sunstruck (2022)

=== Remixes ===
- Hours (Katie Dey remix), (2020)
- Hours (draag me remix), (2020)
- Cowgirl (with cutouts) (Midnight Magic remix), (2024)

=== Singles ===
- idkwntht (2022)
- Cowgirl (with cutouts) (2024)
