= Song (Lullaby for the Working Class album) =

Studio album by Lullaby for the Working Class
- Released: September 21, 1999
- Genre: Folk rock
- Length: 54:57
- Label: Bar/None

Lullaby for the Working Class chronology
I Never Even Asked for Light (1997)	Song (1999)

Professional ratings
Review scores
Source	Rating
AllMusic	4/5 stars
Pitchfork	4.8/10

Song is the third and final studio album by Lullaby for the Working Class. It was released in 1999 on Bar/None Records.

== Critical reception ==
Trouser Press wrote: "Both playful indie-poppers and studious chamber ensemble, Lullaby maps a course through ten songs, establishing and contrasting melodies, building acoustic walls of sound more akin to My Bloody Valentine than Mazzy Star." Exclaim! thought that Lullaby for the Working Class "have fully descended into over-orchestrated meaninglessness."

== Track listing ==
1. "Expand, Contract"
2. "Inherent Song"
3. "Asleep on the Subway"
4. "Seizures"
5. "Non Serviam"
6. "Sketchings on a Bar Room Napkin"
7. "Kitchen Song"
8. "Ghosts"
9. "Still Life"

== Personnel ==
Lullaby for the Working Class

- Matt Silcock – accordion
- Katie Swoboda, Liz Schueller – cello
- Eric Medley – clarinet
- A.J. Mogis – bass, piano
- Shane Aspegren – drums, percussion
- Mike Mogis – guitar, pedal steel, hammered dulcimer, banjo, vibraphone
- Erin Wright, Tiffany Kowalski – violin
- Ted Stevens – vocals, guitar
- Amoree Lovell – backing vocals

Additional personnel

- Mike Mogis and A.J. Mogis - production, recording, mixing
- Doug Van Sloun – mastering
- A.J. Mogis, Jeff Yarbrough, Pat Oakes, Shane Aspegren, Todd Baechle – photography
