= Son, Ambulance =

American indie rock band

- Origin: Omaha, Nebraska, United States
- Genres: Indie rock; roots rock
- Years active: 2001–present
- Labels: Saddle Creek; Polydor (outside North America)
- Members: Joe Knapp; Jeff Koster; Daniel Knapp; Dereck Higgins

Son, Ambulance is an American band based in Omaha, Nebraska.

== Biography ==
Singer/songwriter Joe Knapp featured on albums by other bands, such as Fevers and Mirrors by Bright Eyes, before releasing Son, Ambulance's debut album, a split with Bright Eyes called Oh Holy Fools.

Since then, they have released two more albums: Euphemystic (2001) and Key (2004). The latter was referred to as KEY for the small skeleton key in the CD artwork. Son, Ambulance's lineup has cycled through many phases. Credited musicians for the Euphemystic release included Robert Little on bass, Jeff Koster on drums, and Jeff Tafolla on keyboards. Before, after, and during the recording of Key, the following musicians have been collaborating with the band: Dylan Strimple, Erica Petersen, Daniel Knapp, Jesse McKelvey, Jeff Koster, Jenna Morrison, Corey Broman, John Voris, Landon Hedges, Dereck Higgins, James Cuato, David Ozinga, Zach La Grou, and Clark Baechle.

Son, Ambulance completed a third album, Someone Else's Deja Vu in January 2008, for release in 2008. With its stream of consciousness production, Knapp and Koster brought in talented guests to help, including members of Tilly and the Wall and The Faint.

In February 2015, they has been signed as "active" on the Saddle Creek website after being labeled "inactive" for an indefinite time.

=== Joe Knapp ===
Joe Knapp also the lead singer and songwriter for Son, Ambulance. Knapp has also collaborated with friends and musicians such as Bright Eyes and David Dondero, appearing on Bright Eyes' Every Day and Every Night EP (1999), Fevers and Mirrors (2000), and Noise Floor: Rarities 1998-2005 (2006); David Dondero's The Transient (2002) and # Zero With A Bullet (2010); and Ghosty's Three Pop Songs (2002).

Joe was Nebraska State Chess Champion in 2012. He has been working for the City of Omaha Planning Department.

== Band members ==
- Daniel Knapp
- Joe Knapp – lead vocalist
- Zach La Grou
- David Ozinga
- Dylan Strimple
- Robert Little – bass
- Jeff Koster – drums
- Jeff Tafolla – keyboards

== Discography ==
=== Albums ===
- Euphemystic (2001, Saddle Creek Records)
- Key (2004, Saddle Creek Records)
- Someone Else's Deja Vu (2008, Saddle Creek Records)

=== Compilations ===
- Oh Holy Fools: The Music of Son, Ambulance and Bright Eyes (2001 · Saddle Creek)
- Saddle Creek 50 (2002 · Saddle Creek)
- What Matters Most (2005 · Welcome Home Records)
