= Blanket Warm =

Studio album by Lullaby for the Working Class
- Released: 1996
- Recorded: December 1994 – April 1996
- Studio: Whoopass
- Genre: Indie folk, indie rock
- Length: 51:38
- Label: Bar/None

Lullaby for the Working Class chronology
| Blanket Warm (1996) | I Never Even Asked for Light (1997) |

Blanket Warm is the debut studio album of Lullaby for the Working Class. It was released in 1996 on Bar/None Records.

== Critical reception ==
Professional ratings
Review scores
| Source | Rating |
|---|---|
| AllMusic | 4/5 stars |

The Hartford Courant wrote that "the rough-hewn rural sound here is authentic; you can hear the spaces between notes like the big gaping sky hovering over the Great Plains." The Virginian-Pilot listed Blanket Warm as the fourth best album of 1996.

== Track listing ==
1. "Good Morning" - 4:01
2. "Honey, Drop the Knife" - 3:16
3. "Turpentine" - 3:44
4. "Spreading the Evening Sky with Crows" - 3:13
5. "Boar's Nest" - 3:52
6. "Eskimo Song Duel" - 1:46
7. "Three Peas in a Pod" - 4:00
8. "Rye" - 3:50
9. "Queen of the Long-Legged Insects" - 3:09
10. "The Drama of Your Life" - 3:52
11. "February North 24th St." - 2:49
12. "The Wounded Spider" - 3:45
13. "Good Night" - 10:22

== Personnel ==
Lullaby for the Working Class

- A.J. Mogis - bass
- Anil Seth - cello
- Nathan Putens - clarinet
- Clint Schnase, Shane Aspegren - drums
- Mike Mogis - guitar, banjo, mandolin, glockenspiel
- Andy Strain, Johnathon Hischke - trombone
- Nate Walcott - trumpet
- Chris Gordon - violin
- Ted Stevens - vocals, guitar, lyrics

Production

- Eric Medley - mastering
- A.J. Mogis, Mike Mogis - recording, mixing

Artwork

- Thomas Irvin - layout
- Rob Walters - photography
