= I Never Even Asked for Light =

Studio album by Lullaby for the Working Class
- Released: October 21, 1997
- Genre: Indie rock
- Length: 51:42
- Label: Bar/None

Lullaby for the Working Class chronology
Blanket Warm (1996)	I Never Even Asked for Light (1997)	Song (1999)

Professional ratings
Review scores
Source	Rating
Pitchfork	9.6/10
Uncut	3/5 stars

I Never Even Asked for Light is the second studio album by Lullaby for the Working Class. It was released October 21, 1997 on Bar/None Records.

== Track listing ==
1. "Untitled"
2. "Show Me How the Robots Dance"
3. "Irish Wake"
4. "Jester's Siren"
5. "Hypnotist (Song for Daniel H.)"
6. "In Honor of My Stumbling"
7. "This Is As Close As We Get"
8. "The Sunset & The Electric Bill"
9. "Bread Crumbs"
10. "Descent"
11. "The Man Vs. the Tide (Part 1)"
12. "The Man Vs. the Tide (Part 2)"
13. "The Man Vs. the Tide (Part 3)"

== Personnel ==
- A.J. Mogis - bass, production, recording
- Ben McMahan - cello
- Erin Hill - clarinet
- Eric Medley - bass clarinet
- Jason Carper, Shane Aspegren - drums
- Ken Beck - French horn
- Mike Mogis - guitar, banjo, mandolin, glockenspiel, chimes, melodica, organ, hammered dulcimer, kalimba, percussion, production, recording
- Eric Medley - mastering
- Andy Strain - trombone
- Nate Walcott - trumpet
- Chris Higgins - violin
- Ted Stevens - voice, guitar, ukulele
