= Mayday (Nebraska band) =

American band

- Origin: Omaha, Nebraska, United States
- Genres: Alt country • slowcore • indie folk
- Years active: 2000–2006
- Labels: Bar/None, Greyday, Saddle Creek
- Spinoffs: McCarthy Trenching
- Spinoff of: Cursive, Lullaby for the Working Class
- Past members: Ted Stevens; Tiffany Kowalski; Daniel J. McCarthy; Pat Oakes

Mayday was a band from Omaha, Nebraska, on the Saddle Creek Records label, led by Ted Stevens, also of Cursive and Lullaby for the Working Class.

== Band members ==
Lineup as seen on Bushido Karaoke (2005).

- Ted Stevens
- Tiffany Kowalski
- Dan McCarthy
- Pat Oakes

== Discography ==
=== Albums ===
- Old Blood (2002 · Saddle Creek Records)
- I Know Your Troubles Been Long (2003 · Bar/None Records [cd], Greyday Records [lp])
- Bushido Karaoke (2005 · Saddle Creek Records)

=== Compilations ===
- Various Artists - Saddle Creek 50 (2002 · Saddle Creek Records)
- Various Artists - Lagniappe (2005 · Saddle Creek Records)
- Various Artists - 20 Nights of Wine and Song (2005 · Greyday Productions)
