= The Uneventful Vacation =

Studio album by Commander Venus
- Released: July 8, 1997
- Recorded: July – August 1996
- Genre: Emo
- Length: 40:43 (CD)
- Label: Thick Records, Wind-up Records
- Producer: Commander Venus, Edward Douglas

The Uneventful Vacation is the second and final album released by American emo band Commander Venus in 1997. The album was recorded during the summer of the band's junior year in high school. Despite the album being rushed into recording over summer vacation, and the band experiencing tension between themselves and their producer, the album was considered a mild success, and gained popularity over college airplay. The original pressing of the album on vinyl included a bonus 13th song titled "Congratulations!"

== Track listing ==
1. "Jean's TV" - 2:18
2. "Refused By Light" - 3:42
3. "We'll Always Have Paris" - 4:44
4. "The Uneventful Vacation (Part 1)" - 2:26
5. "Lock 'n' Chase" - 2:53
6. "Life As Expected" - 5:45
7. "The Way Things Had to Be" - 3:57
8. "Dress to Please" - 1:49
9. "The Walk-Around Problem" - 3:53
10. "My Collapsing Frame" - 3:32
11. "The Raining Holiday (Part 2)" - 2:55
12. "The Role of the Hero in Antiquity" - 2:45
13. "Congratulations!" (12" vinyl bonus track)
