= Lullaby for the Working Class =

American indie folk rock band

- Origin: Lincoln, Nebraska, United States
- Genres: Indie folk • chamber folk • alt country • slowcore
- Years active: 1994–1999
- Labels: Bar/None Records
- Spinoffs: Cursive, Mayday, Bright Eyes, Criteria
- Past members: Ted Stevens; Mike Mogis; A.J. Mogis; Shane Aspegren

Lullaby for the Working Class was an indie folk rock band from Lincoln, Nebraska, active from the mid-to-late 1990s. Fronted by Omaha, Nebraska singer-songwriter Ted Stevens (of the bands Mayday and Cursive), the group also featured multi-instrumentalist and producer Mike Mogis of Bright Eyes, his brother, producer A.J. Mogis, and drummer Shane Aspegren.

== Members ==
- Ted Stevens – vocals, guitars
- Mike Mogis – guitars, banjo, mandolin, strings
- A.J. Mogis – bass
- Shane Aspegren – drums, glockenspiel, percussion

== Discography ==
=== Albums ===
- Blanket Warm (1996 · Bar/None Records)
- I Never Even Asked for Light (1997 · Bar/None Records)
- Song (1999 · Bar/None Records)

=== Singles ===
- Consolation (1996)
- In Honor of My Stumbling (1997)
- The Hypnotist (1997) (released on Rykodisc Europe)
- The Ebb & Flow, The Come & Go, The To & Fro (1998)

== See also ==
- Mayday
