= Ugly Buildings, Whores, and Politicians: Greatest Hits 1998–2009 =

Compilation album by Drive-By Truckers
- Released: August 2, 2011
- Recorded: 1998–2009
- Label: New West
- Producer: David Barbe

Drive-By Truckers chronology
Go-Go Boots (2011)	Ugly Buildings, Whores, and Politicians: Greatest Hits 1998–2009 (2011)	English Oceans (2014)

Ugly Buildings, Whores, and Politicians: Greatest Hits 1998–2009 is a compilation album released by New West Records of songs coming from the first seven albums of the Drive-By Truckers discography. It was produced by David Barbe and "leads fans on an abbreviated journey of what the band has accomplished in their first 11 years." The album was released on compact disc and vinyl formats.

== Track listing ==
No.	Title	Writer(s)	Original Album	Length
1.	"The Living Bubba"	Patterson Hood	Gangstabilly
2.	"Bulldozers and Dirt"	Hood	Pizza Deliverance
3.	"Ronnie and Neil"	Hood	Southern Rock Opera
4.	"Zip City"	Mike Cooley	Southern Rock Opera
5.	"Let There Be Rock"	Hood	Southern Rock Opera
6.	"Marry Me"	Cooley	Decoration Day
7.	"Sink Hole"	Hood	Decoration Day
8.	"Carl Perkins' Cadillac"	Cooley	The Dirty South
9.	"Outfit"	Jason Isbell	Decoration Day
10.	"The Righteous Path"	Hood	Brighter Than Creation's Dark
11.	"Gravity's Gone (remix)"	Cooley	A Blessing and a Curse
12.	"Never Gonna Change"	Isbell	The Dirty South
13.	"3 Dimes Down"	Cooley	Brighter Than Creation's Dark
14.	"Lookout Mountain"	Hood	The Dirty South
15.	"Uncle Frank (alternate version)"	Cooley	Pizza Deliverance/The Fine Print
16.	"A World of Hurt"	Hood	A Blessing and a Curse

== Personnel ==
- Patterson Hood – guitar, vocals
- Mike Cooley – guitar, vocals
- Jason Isbell – guitar, vocals
- Brad Morgan – drums, vocals
- Shonna Tucker – bass, vocals
- John Neff – guitar, pedal steel
- Rob Malone – lyrics, vocals, guitar
- Earl Hicks – bass
- Matt Lane – drums

== Charts ==
Chart (2011)	Peak position
US Independent Albums (Billboard)	49
US Top Tastemaker Albums (Billboard)	24
