= John Neff (musician) =

American musician

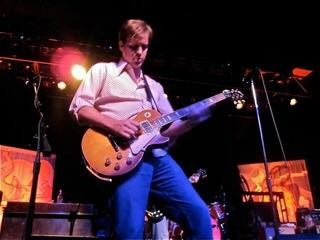
- Neff playing guitar

Background information
- Origin: Columbus, Ohio, US
- Genres: Southern rock; country rock; rock and roll
- Occupation: Musician
- Instruments: Guitar; pedal steel guitar; vocals; Dobro; lap steel guitar
- Years active: 1993–present

John Neff is an American musician based in Athens, Georgia. He is most known for playing guitar and pedal steel guitar.

== Background ==
Neff is originally from Columbus, Ohio, and moved to Savannah, Georgia, when he was 11. He moved to Athens in his early 20s, at which time he started playing pedal steel guitar, for which he is best known. He received his first guitar at age 9 and began learning how to play; he started his music career when he arrived in Athens. Some of his influences include BJ Cole, Buddy Emmons, David Lindley, and Lloyd Green.

== Musical history ==
Some of Neff's earlier bands include the Chasers, Lona, Redneck Greece Deluxe, Star Room Boys, Barbara Cue, and Japancakes, operating out of Athens. Japancakes is still active, releasing their most recent album Japancakes in May 2016.

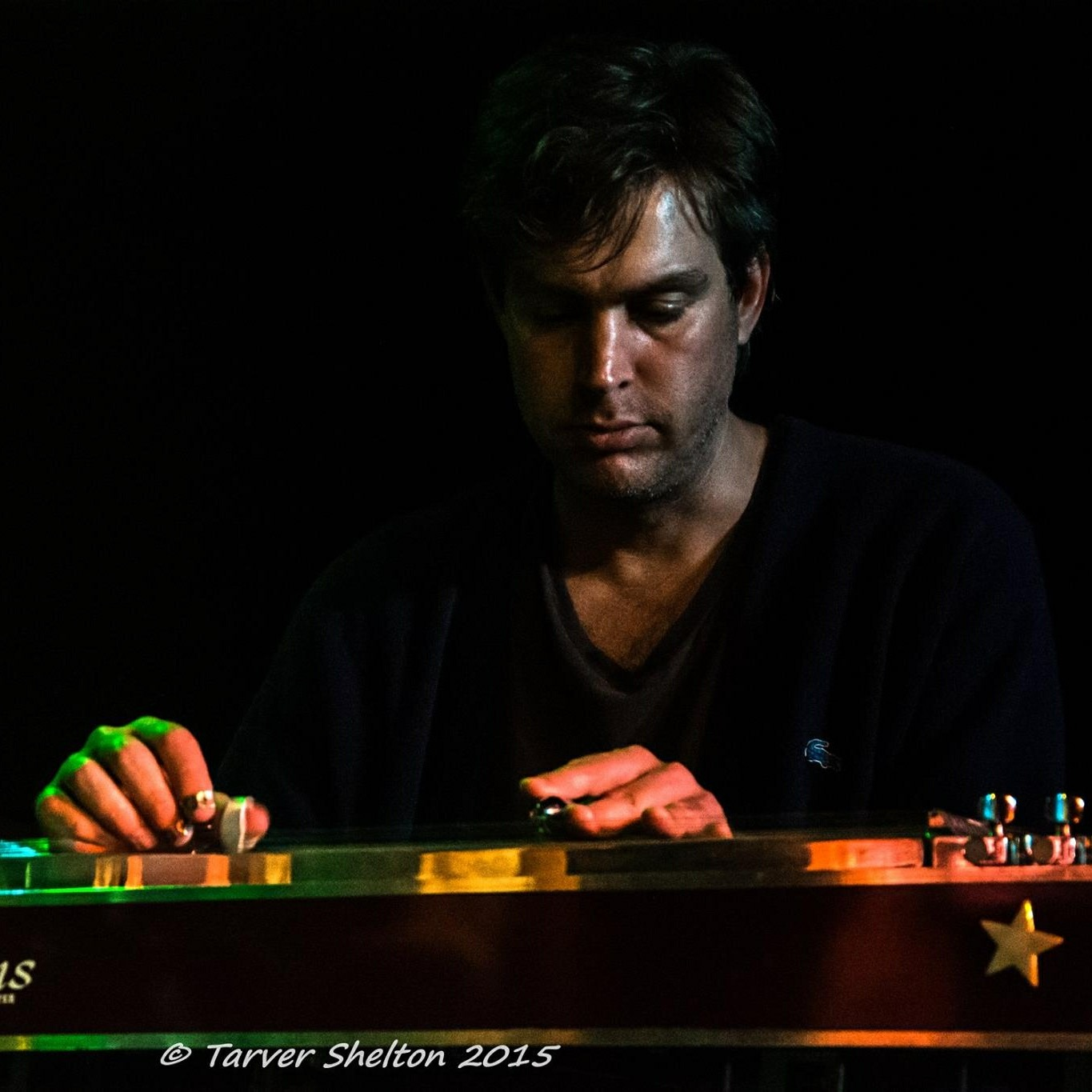
Neff playing pedal steel guitar

Over the course of his musical career, Neff has performed and recorded with bands including the Allman Brothers Band, Bloodkin, Phosphorescent, Jerry Joseph, Superchunk, and Widespread Panic. He has also been involved with David Barbe and the Quick Hooks, Jack Logan and the Monday Night Recorders, and the Dexateens. He has appeared on The Tonight Show Starring Jimmy Fallon twice, Late Night with Conan O'Brien, Later... with Jools Holland, the Late Show With David Letterman and Conan. He also recorded on Bettye LaVette's Grammy nominated album The Scene of the Crime. Neff was also a founding member of Eye Candy with Shonna Tucker, which released an album in 2013. Some other bands he has recorded with are Bo Bedingfield and the Wydelles, Superhorse, The Judge and The Jury, Producto, Papercranes, Jason Isbell, Vic Chesnutt, and Call and Response. Other associated acts include the Weight, the Eskimos, the Burning Angels, Norma Rae, and Future Lives.

Neff was a founding member of the band Drive-By Truckers and appears on their first two albums, Gangstabilly (1998) and Pizza Deliverance (1999). He rejoined the band in 2006 and was a member until 2012. In his time with the band, he was on the albums Decoration Day, Brighter Than Creation's Dark, The Big To-Do, Go-Go Boots, and The Fine Print: A Collection of Oddities and Rarities. The band was also featured on Booker T. Jones' album Potato Hole, which won a Grammy Award for Best Contemporary Instrumental Album at the 52nd Grammy Awards in 2009.

Neff was involved in a Concerto for Rock Band with Strings with R.E.M. bass player Mike Mills featuring violinist Robert McDuffie that performed in places such as Toronto and Rome with a tour of the US. The Concerto expanded to include Chuck Leavell playing a set of covers called "A Night of Georgia Music" The tour resumed in 2022.

Neff also played with Athens country-rock band the Pink Stones. He recorded pedal steel on their release Jimmy & Jesus and was also featured on every song of their next LP, recorded at Chase Park Transduction with Henry Barbe. He is also a member of the band's live lineup.
