= It's Great to Be Alive! =

It's Great To Be Alive!

Live album by Drive-By Truckers
- Released: October 30, 2015
- Recorded: November 20–22, 2014
- Length: 3:16:13
- Label: ATO
- Producer: David Barbe

Drive-By Truckers chronology
| English Oceans (2014) | It's Great To Be Alive! (2015) | American Band (2016) |

It's Great To Be Alive! is the fourth live album by the Southern rock band Drive-By Truckers. Several versions of the album are available on LP, CD and Digital Editions. The album was recorded over a three-night run at the Fillmore in San Francisco, CA on November 20, 21 and 22, 2014.

== Overview ==
2014 marked the 20th anniversary of the Drive-By Truckers, and It's Great to Be Alive! commemorates this anniversary. The album's title is a lyric from the Truckers' song "A World Of Hurt". The album is available as a deluxe set that includes five LPs, three CDs, four small posters, and extensive liner notes. The regular issue includes three CDs.

== Track listing ==
1. Lookout Mountain – 4:51
2. Where the Devil Don't Stay – 4:52
3. Sink Hole – 5:22
4. Made Up English Oceans – 5:16
5. The Righteous Path – 5:15
6. Women Without Whiskey – 4:31
7. The Living Bubba – 6:24
8. Primer Coat – 4:19
9. Mercy Buckets – 5:26
10. Marry Me – 5:46
11. Tornadoes – 5:23
12. Sounds Better in the Song – 5:10
13. Used to Be a Cop – 6:58
14. Shit Shots Count – 4:06
15. Runaway Train – 5:35
16. A Ghost to Most – 4:57
17. Goode's Field Road – 7:35
18. Uncle Frank – 5:13
19. Putting People on the Moon – 7:17
20. First Air of Autumn – 3:35
21. Box of Spiders – 7:47
22. When the Pin Hits the Shell – 3:57
23. A World of Hurt – 7:42
24. Get Downtown – 3:24
25. Ronnie and Neil – 5:03
26. Gravity's Gone – 3:35
27. Pauline Hawkins – 6:26
28. Birthday Boy – 3:32
29. Girls Who Smoke – 4:30
30. Three Dimes Down – 2:53
31. Hell No, I Ain't Happy – 8:10
32. Shut Up and Get on the Plane – 5:24
33. Angels and Fuselage – 7:53
34. Zip City – 5:15
35. Grand Canyon – 13:08

== This Weekend's the Night: Highlights From It's Great To Be Alive! ==
Also released was a single-disc or dual-LP release entitled This Weekend's the Night: Highlights From It's Great To Be Alive! featuring selections from It's Great To Be Alive! People who preordered this release were emailed select additional tracks over a three-month period.

== Track listing ==
1. Lookout Mountain – 4:51
2. Women Without Whiskey – 4:31
3. The Righteous Path – 5:15
4. Birthday Boy – 3:32
5. Runaway Train – 5:35
6. Primer Coat – 4:19
7. Putting People on the Moon – 7:17
8. A Ghost to Most – 4:57
9. Goode's Field Road – 7:35
10. Sounds Better in the Song – 5:10
11. A World of Hurt – 7:42
12. Zip City – 7:53
13. Grand Canyon – 13:08

== Critical reception ==
Professional ratings
Review scores
| Source | Rating |
|---|---|
| AllMusic | 4/5 stars |
| Pitchfork Media | 8/10 |
| Blurt Magazine | 5/5 stars |
| American Songwriter | 4/5 stars |

It's Great To Be Alive! received generally positive reviews from music critics. At Metacritic, which assigns a normalized rating out of 100 to reviews from mainstream critics, the album holds an average score of 88, based on six reviews. Pitchfork Media's Jonathan Bernstein said the album "is the sound of a veteran band in complete command of its back catalog."

== Commercial performance ==
The album debuted at No. 111 on the Billboard 200, selling 5,000 copies in the first week. It has sold 16,000 copies in the United States as of July 2016.

== Personnel ==
- Patterson Hood – guitar, vocals
- Mike Cooley – guitar, vocals
- Brad Morgan – drums
- Matt Patton – bass, vocals
- Jay Gonzalez – guitar, keyboards, vocals
- Alan Williams – trombone

== Charts ==
| Chart (2015) | Peak position |
|---|---|
| US Billboard 200 | 111 |
| US Independent Albums (Billboard) | 10 |
| US Top Rock Albums (Billboard) | 15 |
