= Live from Austin, TX (Drive-By Truckers album) =

Live From Austin TX

Live album by Drive-By Truckers
- Released: July 7, 2009
- Recorded: September 26, 2008
- Length: 71:16
- Label: New West
- Producer: Terry Lickona

Drive-By Truckers chronology
Brighter Than Creation's Dark (2008)	Live From Austin TX (2009)	The Fine Print: A Collection of Oddities and Rarities (2009)

Professional ratings
Review scores
Source	Rating
AllMusic	3.5/5 stars
Robert Christgau	B+
Pitchfork	7/10
PopMatters	8/10 stars

Live From Austin, TX is the second live album by American rock band Drive-By Truckers. It was released as a two disc CD/DVD combo. It was recorded on September 26, 2008, and boasts an almost twelve-minute recording of the song "18 Wheels of Love," which was originally released on their first album Gangstabilly.

Guitarist Patterson Hood stated the album and DVD are: "by far our best filmed performance."

== Track listing ==
1. "Perfect Timing" (Cooley)
2. "Heathens" (Hood)
3. "A Ghost to Most" (Cooley)
4. "The Righteous Path" (Hood)
5. "I'm Sorry Huston" (Tucker)
6. "3 Dimes Down" (Cooley)
7. "Puttin' People on the Moon" (Hood)
8. "Space City" (Cooley)
9. "The Living Bubba" (Hood)
10. "Zip City" (Cooley)
11. "18 Wheels of Love" (Hood)
12. "Let There Be Rock" (Hood)
13. "Marry Me" (Cooley)

== Personnel ==
- Patterson Hood - guitar, vocals
- Mike Cooley - guitar, vocals
- Brad Morgan - drums
- Shonna Tucker - bass, vocals
- John Neff - guitar, pedal steel
- Jay Gonzalez - keyboards

== Charts ==
Chart (2009)	Peak position
US Billboard 200	172
US Independent Albums (Billboard)	28
