= Heat Lightning Rumbles in the Distance =

Studio album by Patterson Hood
- Released: September 11, 2012
- Genre: Rock
- Length: 44:37
- Label: ATO
- Producers: Patterson Hood, David Barbe

Patterson Hood chronology
Murdering Oscar (And Other Love Songs) (2009)	Heat Lightning Rumbles in the Distance (2012)	Exploding Trees & Airplane Screams (2025)

Heat Lightning Rumbles in the Distance is the third solo album by Drive-By Truckers frontman Patterson Hood, released on September 11, 2012 on ATO Records.

== Background and recording ==
Heat Lightning Rumbles in the Distance is based on a novel Hood started writing but never finished. The novel was based on a very difficult time in Hood's life in the early 1990s. Hood wrote the novel while on the road touring in support of The Big To-Do.

== Critical reception ==
Professional ratings
Aggregate scores
Source	Rating
Metacritic	77/100
Review scores
Source	Rating
AllMusic	4.5/5 stars
American Songwriter	4/5 stars
The A.V. Club	B+
MSN Music (Expert Witness)	B+
New York Daily News	4/5 stars
Pitchfork	6.5/10
PopMatters	7/10 stars
Rolling Stone	3.5/5 stars
Uncut	8/10

On review aggregator website Metacritic, the album has a score of 77 out of 100, based on 13 reviews, corresponding to "generally favorable reviews".

== Track listing ==
1. 12:01
2. Leaving Time
3. Disappear
4. Better Off Without
5. (untold pretties)
6. After The Damage
7. Better Than The Truth
8. Betty Ford
9. Depression Era
10. Heat Lightning Rumbles in the Distance
11. Come Back Little Star
12. Fifteen Days (Leaving Time Again)

== Personnel ==
- David Barbe – bass, electric bass, engineer, mixing, producer, shaker
- Greg Calbi – mastering
- Mike Cooley – banjo
- Scott Danbom – cello, fiddle, piano, violin
- Matt DeFilippis – live sound engineer, road manager
- Wes Freed – artwork, illustrations
- Phoebe Gellman – additional production
- Jay Gonzalez – accordion, mellotron, piano, piano (grand), piano (upright), Wurlitzer electric piano
- Tim Hall – additional production
- Kelly Hogan – vocal harmony, vocals
- David Hood – bass
- Lilla Hood – art direction
- Patterson Hood – guitars, mandocello, monologue, photography, producer, vocal harmony, vocals, background vocals
- Rebecca Hood – cover photo, photography
- Will Johnson – atmosphere, electric guitar, vocal harmony
- Andy LeMaster – engineer
- Brad Morgan – drums, percussion, pipe snare drum, tambourine
- Jacob Morris – cello, violin
- John Neff – pedal steel guitar
- Steve Rainbow – additional production
- Jon Salter – additional production
- Edwin Schroter – additional production
- Traci Thomas – publicity
- Drew Vandenberg – engineer
