= The Fine Print: A Collection of Oddities and Rarities =

Compilation album by Drive-By Truckers
- Released: September 1, 2009
- Recorded: 2003–2008
- Length: 57:59
- Label: New West
- Producer: David Barbe

Drive-By Truckers chronology
Live from Austin, TX (2009)	The Fine Print: A Collection of Oddities and Rarities (2009)	The Big To Do (2010)

Professional ratings
Review scores
Source	Rating
Allmusic	3.5/5 stars
PopMatters	7/10 stars

The Fine Print is a compilation album by American rock band Drive-By Truckers. Released in 2009, it consists unreleased material mostly recorded throughout the making of their albums Decoration Day and The Dirty South; a highly prolific period for the band. It features album artwork and a sample of concert posters from 2009 by Wes Freed, and is produced by David Barbe.

== Background ==
The Fine Print is the first Drive-By Trucker studio album to include covers of other artist's original recordings; most notably "Rebels" by Tom Petty, recorded for the King of the Hill episode "The Redneck on Rainey Street", and "Like a Rolling Stone" by Bob Dylan. The latter of these songs has each of its four verses sung in rotation by Hood, Tucker, Isbell, and Cooley.

Two of the songs on the album, "Uncle Frank" and "Goode's Field Road" are alternate takes of songs released on other Drive-By Truckers albums. "Uncle Frank" has only minor differences from the original as heard on Pizza Deliverance, while "Goode's Field Road" is much harder and faster than the slower paced track eventually recorded for Brighter Than Creation's Dark. The Fine Print version of "Goode's Field Road" almost made it onto The Dirty South, but at the last minute was switched for "Lookout Mountain".

As the album was recorded during Jason Isbell's tenure with the Drive-By Truckers, two of his songs as performed by the Drive-By Truckers were also included. Though released in 2009, when Jay Gonzalez was already an official member of the band, he does not make an appearance on The Fine Print due to the recording dates of the tracks.

== Track listing ==
1. "George Jones Talkin' Cell Phone Blues" - 4:08 (Patterson Hood)
2. "Rebels" - 4:53 (Tom Petty)
3. "Uncle Frank" - 5:22 (alternate version) (Mike Cooley)
4. "TVA" - 6:57 (Jason Isbell)
5. "Goode's Field Road" - 4:15 (alternate version) (Hood)
6. "The Great Car Dealer War" - 5:38 (Hood)
7. "Mama Bake a Pie (Daddy Kill A Chicken)" - 3:20 (Tom T. Hall)
8. "When The Well Runs Dry" - 4:10 (Isbell)
9. "Mrs. Claus' Kimono" - 4:26 (Hood)
10. "Play It All Night Long" - 5:10 (Warren Zevon)
11. "Little Pony And The Great Big Horse" - 3:38 (Cooley)
12. "Like a Rolling Stone" - 6:02 (Bob Dylan)

== Personnel ==
- Patterson Hood - guitar, vocals
- Mike Cooley - guitar, vocals
- Jason Isbell - guitar, vocals
- Brad Morgan - drums, vocals
- Shonna Tucker - bass, vocals
- John Neff - guitar, pedal steel

== Charts ==
Chart (2009)	Peak position
US Billboard 200	82
US Independent Albums (Billboard)	8
US Top Rock Albums (Billboard)	28
US Indie Store Album Sales (Billboard)	12
