= American Band (album) =

Studio album by Drive-By Truckers
- Released: September 30, 2016
- Genre: Rock and roll
- Length: 46:45
- Label: ATO
- Producer: David Barbe

Drive-By Truckers chronology
English Oceans (2014)	American Band (2016)	The Unraveling (2020)

Singles from American Band
- 1. "Surrender Under Protest" Released: 2016

American Band is the eleventh studio album by American rock band Drive-By Truckers, released on September 30, 2016, on ATO Records. Produced by long-time collaborator David Barbe, and recorded in the summer of 2016, it is the first Drive-By Truckers album since 1999's Pizza Deliverance not to feature cover art by Wes Freed.

American Band is their second record with only two songwriters, the other being English Oceans, released two years earlier. All of their earlier records featured three songwriters. The record is notable for containing the most political lyrics of the band's career to date. The album was met with critical acclaim.

== Packaging ==
Unlike previous albums, which featured cover art made by southern Gothic painter Wes Freed, American Band's album depicts a shadowy image of the American flag being lowered to half-mast. The photo was taken by photographer Danny Clinch. In an interview with Chuck Armstrong of The Boot, Mike Cooley said that the photo is based on a song he always wanted to write about how long the American flag stays at half-mast these days in the United States.

== Composition ==
=== Lyrics ===
Jonathan Bernstein, writing for Rolling Stone, said that American Band is the group's most politically charged record yet, noting the controversy it generated, saying Cooley and Patterson have written an album of "blunt, pissed-off Trump-era anthems that already began to stir controversy months before its release." Nearly half of the albums' 11 songs deal with gun violence. The song "Ramon Casiano" is about the little known story of gun rights advocate and former NRA leader Harlon Carter, who shot and killed a 15-year-old Hispanic boy in 1931, but escaped incarceration. Patterson wrote "What it Means" in response to the deaths of Trayvon Martin and Michael Brown, unarmed black teenagers whose killings sparked the Black Lives Matter movement. "Surrender Under Protest", "Ever South", and "Guns of Umpqua" examine generations of racial injustice in a country that "shoots first and asks questions later." "Once They Banned Imagine" talks about the Establishment's attempts to ban art in times of crisis, particularly after the September 11 attacks. Cooley recalled that "After the 9/11 attacks, Clear Channel put out that list of songs that their stations shouldn't play. I couldn't get my head around the notion that John Lennon's 'Imagine' was on that list, that it was something we didn't need to hear at a time when it was exactly what we needed to hear. The Red Scare, the War on Crime, the War on Terrorism, they're just excuses for cracking down on anything the establishment finds objectionable."

== Critical reception ==
Professional ratings
Aggregate scores
Source	Rating
AnyDecentMusic?	8.4/10
Metacritic	88/100
Review scores
Source	Rating
AllMusic	4.5/5 stars
American Songwriter	4/5 stars
Chicago Tribune	3.5/4 stars
Exclaim!	10/10
The Independent	5/5 stars
Mojo	4/5 stars
Rolling Stone	4/5 stars
Slant Magazine	4.5/5 stars
Uncut	9/10
Vice	A

American Band received very positive reviews from music critics. At Metacritic, which assigns a normalized rating out of 100 to reviews from mainstream critics, the album holds an average score of 88, based on 18 reviews, which means "universal acclaim". Carl Wilson of Slate called the album their "most powerful release in almost a decade", believing it to be " a kind of rebirth for the band." Greg Kot of the Chicago Tribune also believed that the album renewed the band, saying "The band's feel for melodies remains sharp, and Hood's accomplished songwriting is now matched by Cooley, which makes for one of the band's strongest front-to-back albums. At a time in their career when most bands are struggling to match past glories, the Drive-By Truckers sound like the stakes are higher than ever." The Independent praised the album, saying it is "thoughtful, engaging and utterly contemporary, it's one of the albums of the year. Nico Lang of Salon called American Band rock music's best protest album in years, saying it is "to 2016 what American Idiot represented for the Bush era — a protest album that rages against the political machine."

=== Accolades ===
Publication	Accolade	Year	Rank	Ref.
Chicago Tribune	Top Albums of 2016	2016	7	
Paste	The 50 Best Albums of 2016	2016	48	
Rolling Stone	50 Best Albums of 2016	2016	24	
Rough Trade	Albums of the Year	2016	63	
Pazz & Jop	The Top Albums of 2016	2016	17	
Metacritic	Best Albums of 2016	2016	7	

== Track listing ==
No.	Title	Writer(s)	Length
1.	"Ramon Casiano"	Mike Cooley	3:58
2.	"Darkened Flags on the Cusp of Dawn"	Patterson Hood	2:42
3.	"Surrender Under Protest"	Cooley	3:50
4.	"Guns of Umpqua"	Hood	3:50
5.	"Filthy and Fried"	Cooley	3:38
6.	"Sun Don't Shine"	Hood	3:25
7.	"Kinky Hypocrite"	Cooley	3:14
8.	"Ever South"	Hood	5:45
9.	"What It Means"	Hood	6:25
10.	"Once They Banned Imagine"	Cooley	4:12
11.	"Baggage"	Hood	5:46
Total length:			46:45

== Personnel ==
- Patterson Hood – vocals, guitar, mandocello
- Mike Cooley – vocals, guitar
- Brad Morgan – drums, percussion
- Matt Patton – bass, backing vocals (tracks 3, 6)
- Jay Gonzalez – Hammond B-3, guitar, backing vocals (tracks 2, 3, 4, 6, 8, 11), piano, Wurlitzer, celeste (track 4), synthesizer (track 8)

== Charts ==
Chart (2016)	Peak position
Belgian Albums (Ultratop Flanders)	54
Belgian Albums (Ultratop Wallonia)	138
Dutch Albums (Album Top 100)	66
Norwegian Albums (VG-lista)	40
Scottish Albums (Official Charts)	17
Spanish Albums (PROMUSICAE)	97
Swedish Albums (Sverigetopplistan)	50
UK Albums (Official Charts)	29
UK Americana Albums (Official Charts)	2
UK Independent Albums (Official Charts)	10
UK Album Downloads (Official Charts)	88
US Billboard 200	26
US Americana/Folk Albums (Billboard)	4
US Independent Albums (Billboard)	5
US Top Rock Albums (Billboard)	8
US Indie Store Album Sales (Billboard)	2
