= Killers and Stars =

Studio album by Patterson Hood
- Released: May 4, 2004
- Recorded: March 2001
- Genre: Country rock
- Length: 36:42
- Label: New West

Patterson Hood chronology
| Killers and Stars (2004) | Murdering Oscar (And Other Love Songs) (2009) |

Killers and Stars is the first solo album by Drive-By Truckers frontman Patterson Hood. It was released on May 4, 2004 on New West Records. It was originally not intended for commercial release, and limited editions of it were sold at shows before it was officially released in 2004.

== Background and recording ==
Hood recorded the album over two nights in March 2001 in his dining room. At the time, the Drive-By Truckers had just finished recording their album Southern Rock Opera, and Hood was going through a divorce. In its liner notes, he recalled his mental state when he was recording the album: "I was feeling pretty freaked out and isolated and this album was my therapy." Because it was recorded at Hood's home, multiple critics have compared it to Bruce Springsteen's album Nebraska, which was also a home recording. However, with regard to these comparisons, Rob Trucks noted that "Hood's self-imposed exile fosters a rage more aligned with a dormant Charlie Starkweather than Springsteen."

== Critical reception ==
Professional ratings
Review scores
| Source | Rating |
|---|---|
| AllMusic | 4/5 stars |
| Blender | 3/5 stars |
| No Depression | (favorable) |
| Pitchfork Media | 7.4/10 |
| PopMatters | (moderately favorable) |
| Village Voice | (2-star Honorable Mention) |

Critics generally gave Killers and Stars favorable reviews; for example, Mark Deming of AllMusic gave it 4 out of 5 stars and wrote that "like Nebraska, Killers and Stars is an album whose plain surfaces and rough edges only add to the impact of the final work." Another favorable review was written by Pitchfork Media's Stephen M. Deusner, who gave the album a 7.4 out of 10 rating. Deusner wrote that "While its ultimate fate will likely be as a footnote to his full-time band's long haul, Killers and Stars is strong enough to stand as a separate entity, a personal statement from Hood, sovereign from the interlocked identities of the Drive-By Truckers." Dan Macintosh wrote in Country Standard Time that "...while [Killers and Stars is] not exactly pretty, it's nevertheless starkly honest and moving."

== Track listing ==
1. Uncle Disney – 2:50
2. Rising Son – 2:58
3. The Assassin – 3:17
4. Pay No Attention To Alice – 3:05
5. Belinda Carlisle Diet – 1:42
6. Fire – 2:39
7. Hobo – 3:39
8. Miss Me Gone – 4:54
9. Phil's Transplant – 3:35
10. Frances Farmer – 2:14
11. Old Timer's Disease – 2:25
12. Cat Power – 2:42

== Personnel ==
- Jason Biggers – illustrations
- Jennifer Bryant – package design
- Toby Cole – illustrations
- Matt DeFilippis – photography
- Chuck Hermes – design
- Patterson Hood – guitar, main personnel, primary artist, vocals
- Rebecca Wright – photography
