= Jay Gonzalez =

Jay Gonzalez may refer to:

- Jay Gonzalez (politician)
- Jay Gonzalez (musician)
