= Patterson Hood =

American singer-songwriter (born 1964)

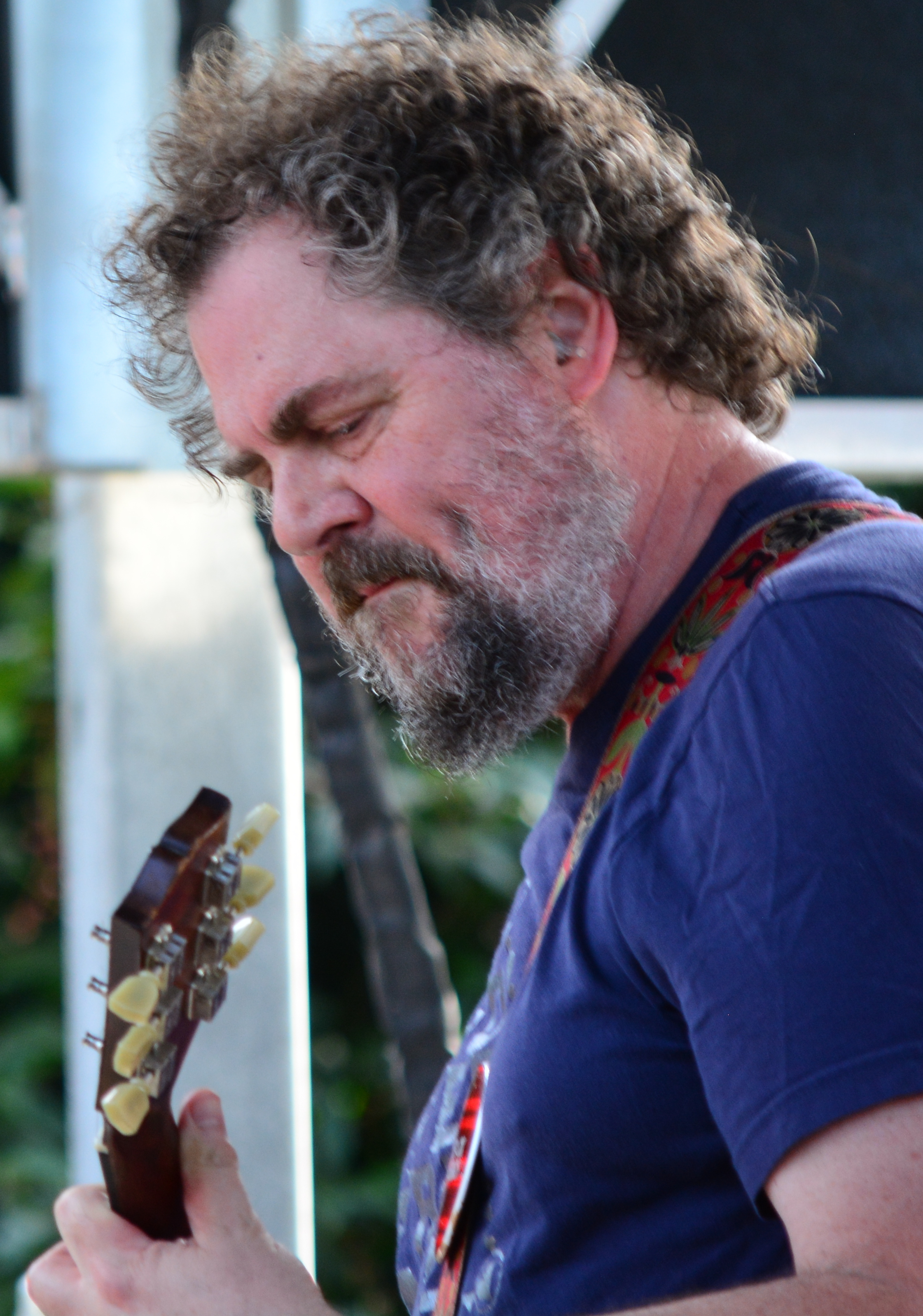
- Patterson Hood, 2022

Background information
- Born: March 24, 1964 (age 61); Muscle Shoals, Alabama; United States
- Genres: Southern rock; country rock; rock and roll
- Occupations: Musician; singer-songwriter
- Instruments: Vocals; guitar
- Years active: 1984–present
- Labels: ATO Records; MapleMusic Recordings; New West Records
- Website: pattersonhood.com

Patterson David Hood (born March 24, 1964) is an American singer-songwriter and co-founder of the band Drive-By Truckers.

== Early life ==
Hood was born in Muscle Shoals, Alabama, the son of Jan Patterson Adams and David Hood, the longtime bassist of the Muscle Shoals Rhythm Section. He has a younger sister, Lilla Hood. His parents married young, and divorced when he was in college. His mother later remarried. Hood wrote the song "18 Wheels of Love" about their relationship.

Hood began writing songs at the age of eight, and by the time he was 14 he was playing guitar in a local rock band. He went to college at the University of North Alabama, where he formed the band Adam's House Cat in 1985 with his friend Mike Cooley, and the group won Musician Magazine's Best Unsigned Band competition three years later. However, the band's regional acclaim did not translate into significant commercial success, and its sole full-length album wasn't released until September 21, 1998.

== Career ==
After Adam's House Cat split up, Hood and Cooley continued to work together. They eventually formed the Drive-By Truckers in 1996, following a mutual relocation to Athens, Georgia. Drawing equal influence from country and rock & roll, the Drive-By Truckers released their first album, Gangstabilly, in 1998.They continued to tour heavily and have released 14 albums as of 2025.

Hood has released four solo albums in his career, beginning with 2004's Killers and Stars on New West Records, followed by the self-released (on Ruth St. Records) Murdering Oscar (And Other Love Songs) in 2009 and 2012's Heat Lightning Rumbles in the Distance for ATO Records.

On February 21, 2025, Hood released his fourth studio album, Exploding Trees & Airplane Screams, via ATO Records.

In 2012, Hood formed Patterson Hood and the Downtown 13 with Mike Mills of R.E.M., John Bell and Todd Nance of Widespread Panic, fellow Truckers Jay Gonzalez, Brad Morgan, John Neff and David Barbe, and Athens musicians Claire Campbell, Lera Lynn, Henry Barbe, Brannen Miles, Carter King and Payton Bradford. The collective was formed to record a track After It's Gone to protest the building of a new Wal-Mart in downtown Athens. After It's Gone was released on 7" vinyl by ATO Records for Record Store Day 2012.

In 2020, Hood had a small role in the film The Dark Divide.

== Personal life ==
Hood has been married three times. He began dating his current spouse, Rebecca Hood, in 2001. They have been married since 2004 and have two children Hood moved to Athens, Georgia in April 1994, where he lived for 21 years. He and his family relocated to Portland, Oregon in the summer of 2015.

In July 2015, Hood was featured in a New York Times editorial titled "The South’s Heritage Is So Much More Than a Flag" which discusses the misrepresentation of the history of the Confederate flag in the Southern United States.

== Discography ==
=== Solo albums ===
Studio albums

- Killers and Stars (2004)
- Murdering Oscar (And Other Love Songs) (2009)
- Heat Lightning Rumbles in the Distance (2012)
- Exploding Trees & Airplane Screams (2025)

=== Patterson Hood and the Downtown 13 ===
Singles

- After It's Gone (2012)

=== Drive-By Truckers ===
Studio albums

- Gangstabilly (1998)
- Pizza Deliverance (1999)
- Southern Rock Opera (2001)
- Decoration Day (2003)
- The Dirty South (2004) No. 147 US
- A Blessing and a Curse (2006) No. 50 US
- Brighter Than Creation's Dark (2008) No. 37 US
- The Big To-Do (2010) No. 22 US, No. 61 UK
- Go-Go Boots (2011) No. 35 US No. 58 UK
- English Oceans (2014)
- American Band (2016)
- The Unraveling (2020)
- The New OK (2020)
- Welcome 2 Club XIII (2022)

Live albums

- Alabama Ass Whuppin' (2000)
- Live From Austin, TX (2009)
- Live at Third Man (2011)
- It's Great To Be Alive! (2015)

Collections

- The Fine Print: A Collection of Oddities and Rarities (2009)
- Ugly Buildings, Whores, and Politicians: Greatest Hits 1998-2009 (2011)

Singles

- "Bulldozers and Dirt"/"Nine Bullets" (1996)
- "Never Gonna Change" (2004)
- "Aftermath USA" (2006)
- "A Blessing and a Curse" (2006)
- "Self-Destructive Zones" (2008)
- "A Ghost to Most" (2008)
- "The Righteous Path" (2008)
- "This Fucking Job" (2010, retitled "Working This Job" for radio and music video channels)
- "Your Woman Is A Livin' Thing"/"Just Maybe" (2010)
- "The Thanksgiving Filter"/"Used To Be A Cop" (2010)
