= The EARL =

Alternative music venue in Atlanta, Georgia, U.S.

Coordinates: 33.741°N 84.346°W

The EARL (East Atlanta Restaurant and Lounge)
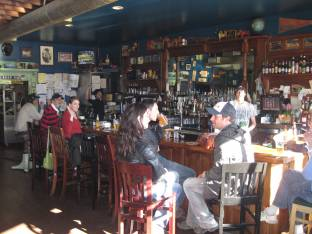
- Interactive map of The EARL (East Atlanta Restaurant and Lounge)
- Location: 488 Flat Shoals Avenue; Atlanta, Georgia, USA
- Type: Nightclub
- Event: Alternative

Construction
- Opened: July 1999

Website
- http://www.badearl.com

The EARL is an alternative music venue in Atlanta, Georgia, located on Flat Shoals Avenue in the neighborhood of East Atlanta.

== History ==
The Earl was opened in 1999 by John Searson, a long-time Atlanta resident but a newcomer to the restaurant and live entertainment business. The building at 488 Flat Shoals Avenue was being used to store mattresses when Searson signed the lease with the intention of transforming the space into a club and lounge.Much of the business was built by hand, with licensed contractors called in when needed. Even now, the interior of the building reflects Searson's bare-knuckled approach to the business. The bar is made out of a tree which fell on his property while he was building the bar.

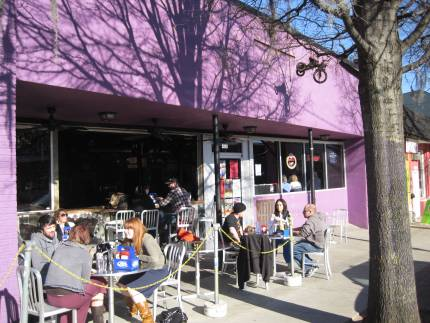

At the time, the neighborhood was rapidly gentrifying, but wasn't anywhere near as safe as it is now. The front window had two bullet holes from a scuffle in the street. Searson let a friend sleep in the back to protect the property from any local criminals. The restaurant's opening was a source of intrigue in the neighborhood, with residents pestering Searson to learn when it would be opened. The slow pace of the work prompted him to post a sign on the door saying it would be open when it was open.

Opening night came with the bar already teetering on the edge of bankruptcy. A local distributor had donated three kegs of Pabst Blue Ribbon, but Searson says one of those was consumed before the doors were even open. Yet from the beginning, the restaurant was an improbable success.

== List of performers ==
A partial list of bands and artists that have appeared at the Earl since its opening:

- Active Child
- Agalloch
- Alejandro Escovedo
- American Music Club
- ...And You Will Know Us By The Trail Of Dead
- Aoife O'Donovan
- Anvil
- Art Brut
- Atlas Sound
- Band of Horses
- Beach House
- Ben Kweller
- Ben Lee
- Black Kids
- Black Lips
- Blitzen Trapper
- Bob Mould
- Boris
- Brian Posehn
- Cat Power
- Clap Your Hands Say Yeah
- Clinic
- Cracker
- Daniel Lanois
- David Cross
- Dax Riggs
- Dead Confederate
- Death Cab for Cutie
- Deerhunter
- Deicide
- Dick Dale
- Dr. Dog
- Drab Majesty
- Earthling
- Eric Bachmann
- Explosions in the Sky
- Girls
- Gogol Bordello
- Grupo Fantasma
- Guitar Wolf
- High on Fire
- Heroine Sheiks
- Holly Golightly
- Illiterate Light
- Iron & Wine
- Isis
- Jay Reatard
- Joanna Newsom
- Jonathan Richman
- King Gizzard & the Lizard Wizard
- Langhorne Slim
- Les Savy Fav
- Liars
- Los Campesinos
- M83
- Magnapop
- Mahjongg
- Mary Weiss
- Manchester Orchestra
- Mastodon
- Midlake
- Mike Cooley
- Mike Watt
- Mission of Burma
- Modern English
- Mono
- Mudhoney
- My Morning Jacket
- Neko Case
- Patton Oswalt
- Pedro The Lion
- Peelander-Z
- Pinback
- Polvo
- Raven
- The Rock*A*Teens
- Ronnie Spector
- Shannon Wright
- Shipping News
- Shonen Knife
- Silver Jews
- Sondre Lerche
- Southern Culture on the Skids
- St. Vincent
- Tapes n' Tapes
- Taurus
- Ted Leo and the Pharmacists
- The Avett Brothers
- The Brian Jonestown Massacre
- The Detroit Cobras
- The Dirty Projectors
- The Dodos
- The Hiss
- The Hold Steady
- The Kills
- The Meat Puppets
- The Muffs
- The National
- The Postal Service
- The Queers
- The Reverend Horton Heat
- The Rosebuds
- The Struts
- The Thermals
- The Walkmen
- The Wedding Present
- The Whigs
- Tokyo Police Club
- Tortoise
- Tyler Childers
- Upchuck
- Vader
- Vampire Weekend
- Vic Chesnutt
- VNV Nation
- Wayne "The Train" Hancock
- Yard Act

== Awards ==
- One of Playboy's 10 best rock clubs in the U.S.
- One of the Wall Street Journal's best hamburgers in the U.S.
- One of Paste Magazine's 40 best music venues in the U.S.
- 2005 Best Place to Hear Local Music/Best Rock Club
