= Go-Go Boots (album) =

Studio album by Drive-By Truckers
- Released: February 14, 2011
- Recorded: 2009–2010
- Genre: R&B; Southern soul
- Length: 66:24
- Label: ATO; Play It Again Sam
- Producer: David Barbe

Drive-By Truckers chronology
The Big To-Do (2010)	Go-Go Boots (2011)	Ugly Buildings, Whores, and Politicians: Greatest Hits 1998-2009 (2011)

Singles from Go-Go Boots
- 1. "The Thanksgiving Filter" Released: November 26, 2010

Go-Go Boots is the ninth studio album by American rock band Drive-By Truckers, first released February 14, 2011, on Play It Again Sam Records. It was produced by record producer David Barbe and recorded during 2009 to 2010, concurrently with sessions for the band's previous album The Big To-Do (2010). Upon its release, Go-Go Boots received positive reviews from most music critics.

== Background ==
The majority of the album was recorded over three blocks of sessions during 2009. The 25 songs resulting from these sessions were split between The Big To-Do and its follow-up Go-Go Boots. After The Big To-Do's release, the band continued working on and tweaking the album throughout 2010, eventually recording 5 more songs for Go-Go Boots during this period. Go-Go Boots marks the eighth Drive-By Truckers album produced by David Barbe, and is the eighth Drive-By Trucker LP with artwork designed by Wes Freed.

The album was released in the United States on February 15 by ATO Records and in Europe on February 14, 2011, by Play It Again Sam Records. The album's first single, "The Thanksgiving Filter" (with "Used To Be A Cop" as the b-side) was released as a limited edition vinyl on November 26, 2010.

== Music ==
Go-Go Boots expands on the country and soul music influences of the band's previous work. Phil Mongredien of The Observer writes that "the influence of Aretha and Otis occasionally informs their country/southern rock fusion [...] with a smattering of 60s soul-inspired flourishes". The band's guitarist and frontman Patterson Hood described the album as their "most different and most Muscle Shoals sounding album." The band recorded two covers by fellow Muscle Shoals artist Eddie Hinton for the album. Bassist Shonna Tucker sings Hinton's "Where's Eddie", while Hood performs "Everybody Needs Love".

Of the album's content, Hood commented in a letter to fans, "If The Big To-Do was an action adventure summertime flick (albeit with some brainy and dark undercurrents) this one is a noir film." According to The Guardian's Michael Hann, the album's themes focus on "lives turned sour; [...] that shuffles around the Deep South". Andy Gill of The Independent writes of its themes and characters, "the brooding protagonists of songs such as 'Ray's Automatic Weapon' and 'Used to Be a Cop' are captured on the cusp of catastrophe, at the end of their tether, while the adulterous itch prompted by a dancer's boots in the title-track bristles with portents of recrimination".

== Reception ==
=== Critical response ===
Professional ratings
Aggregate scores
Source	Rating
AnyDecentMusic?	7.1/10
Metacritic	78/100
Review scores
Source	Rating
AllMusic	4/5 stars
Chicago Tribune	3/4 stars
The Guardian	4/5 stars
The Independent	4/5 stars
Mojo	4/5 stars
MSN Music (Expert Witness)	A−
Pitchfork	7.7/10
Q	4/5 stars
Rolling Stone	3.5/5 stars
Spin	7/10

Go-Go Boots received positive reviews from most music critics. At Metacritic, which assigns a normalized rating out of 100 to reviews from mainstream critics, the album received an average score of 78, based on 25 reviews, which indicates "generally favorable reviews". AllMusic editor Mark Deming complimented its noirish themes, stating "The craft of Patterson Hood and Mike Cooley's songwriting is as strong as ever, drawing believable characters and giving them lives that make dramatic sense". Deming noted an "impressive sense of dynamics" in the band's music and commented that "There are moments where Go-Go Boots recalls Exile on Main St., another album that makes much out of feel and the way musicians play off one another". Rolling Stone writer Jody Rosen described the album as "a raggedy revision of classic southern soul" and stated "It's a slight shift from DBT's usual muscular alt-country, but the rest is familiar: great storytelling [...] hinged to choruses that lodge in your cranium". Sean McCarthy of PopMatters viewed it as an improvement over their previous album, The Big To-Do, stating "the statements aren’t nearly as boisterous, the mood is more consistent, and the characters that occupy the songs are more fleshed out". Peter Watts of Uncut praised the band's "writing absorbing tales of smalltown characters and setting them to raucous, life-affirming music", calling it "a more restrained affair, a country-soul stew populated by brooding ex-cops, frustrated movie stars, wife-murdering preachers and sweet old ladies".

However, Slant Magazine's Jonathan Keefe criticized the band's songwriting and found Hood's observations "literal and tin-eared", writing that "Go-Go Boots aims for a soulful, introspective vibe, but it ends up as the dullest album in the Truckers's catalogue". Joseph Viney of Sputnikmusic wrote unfavorably of its musical style, stating "A majority of the songs keep to the same tempo and elicit little variety". Chicago Tribune writer Greg Kot commented that "a little more variation would’ve been welcome", but gave it three out of four stars and complimented its "acoustic-flavored country and soul colors". Pitchfork's Stephen M. Deusner viewed the album as a departure from the "rock noise" of their previous albums, "indulging [Mike] Cooley's country jones as well as the band's more acoustic tendencies". Deusner called it "a more dynamic record" than The Big To-Do, noting "a greater textural range, from the noir ramble of 'Ray's Automatic Weapon' to the spidery tension of 'Used to Be a Cop', one of Hood's best character sketches". In his consumer guide for MSN Music, critic Robert Christgau wrote that "they turn down the boogie so we're sure to get the lyrics" and commented that "Cooley owns the best tunes and the best lines".

=== Accolades ===
Uncut placed the album at number 19 on its list of "Top 50 albums of 2011" while Mojo placed the album at number 26.

== Track listing ==
No.	Title	Writer(s)	Length
1.	"I Do Believe"	Hood	3:31
2.	"Go-Go Boots"	Hood	5:36
3.	"Dancin' Ricky"	Tucker	3:26
4.	"Cartoon Gold"	Cooley	3:13
5.	"Ray's Automatic Weapon"	Hood	4:25
6.	"Everybody Needs Love"	Eddie Hinton	4:35
7.	"Assholes"	Hood	4:39
8.	"The Weakest Man"	Cooley	3:19
9.	"Used to Be a Cop"	Hood	7:03
10.	"I Hear You Hummin’ (Vinyl Only Bonus Track)"	Tucker	3:41
11.	"The Fireplace Poker"	Hood	8:14
12.	"Where’s Eddie"	Hinton	3:01
13.	"The Thanksgiving Filter"	Hood	5:34
14.	"Pulaski"	Cooley	4:24
15.	"Mercy Buckets"	Hood	5:24

== Personnel ==
Credits for Go-Go Boots adapted from Allmusic.

- David Barbe – bass, engineer, mixing, producer
- The Bottom Feeders – vocals, background vocals
- Greg Calbi – mastering
- Colin Cargile – archivist, monitor engineer
- Mike Cooley – banjo, acoustic guitar, electric guitar, vocals
- Matt DeFilippis – engineer
- Wes Freed – artwork
- Jay Gonzalez – accordion, Hammond B3, Piano, background vocals, Wurlitzer, singing saw
- Lilla Hood – art direction
- Patterson Hood – acoustic guitar, electric guitar, liner notes, vocals, background vocals
- Craig Lieske – assistant
- Jack Logan – vocals
- Brad Morgan – drums
- John Neff – dobro, guitar, pedal steel, sitar, slide guitar
- John Salter – A&R
- Supertramp Sanchez – accordion, soloist
- Damon Scott – stage production
- Slantbar Johnny – feedback
- Jason Thrasher – photography
- Shonna Tucker – bass, piano, vocals, background vocals
- Drew Vandenberg – assistant engineer

== Charts ==
Chart (2011)	Peak position
Belgian Albums (Ultratop Flanders)	69
Dutch Albums (Album Top 100)	88
Norwegian Albums (VG-lista)	29
Swedish Albums (Sverigetopplistan)	43
UK Albums (OCC)	58
US Billboard 200	35
US Independent Albums (Billboard)	8
US Top Rock Albums (Billboard)	8
US Indie Store Album Sales (Billboard)	4
