= The Unraveling (Drive-By Truckers album) =

Studio album by Drive-By Truckers
- Released: January 31, 2020
- Length: 42:24
- Label: ATO
- Producer: David Barbe

Drive-By Truckers chronology
American Band (2016)	The Unraveling (2020)	The New OK (2020)

Singles from The Unraveling
- 1. "Armageddon's Back in Town" Released: November 20, 2019

The Unraveling is the twelfth studio album by American rock band Drive-By Truckers, released on January 31, 2020, on ATO Records. It was produced by long-time collaborator David Barbe, and recorded between 2017 and 2019.

The album continues the themes of political angst from their previous album, American Band. In the album's liner notes, songwriter Patterson Hood summarized the album's inspiration, writing "21st Century USA, tanks rolling through the streets of Washington DC as our utopian dreams give way to a dystopian now. Nearly a generation since the towers fell and the shit came down. William Gibson's dark visions have come to pass, everyone is connected and more disconnected than ever. Our children have lock-down drills." Hood's songs "Thoughts and Prayers" and "Babies in Cages" take on the issues of gun violence and the Trump administration family separation policy directly, and rank among the most political the band has ever written.

== Reception ==
Professional ratings
Aggregate scores
Source	Rating
Metacritic	80/100
Review scores
Source	Rating
AllMusic	4/5 stars
American Songwriter	4/5 stars
Chicago Tribune	3.5/4 stars
Exclaim!	7/10
Pitchfork	7.1/10
Rolling Stone	3.5/5 stars
Slant Magazine	4/5 stars

The Unraveling received positive reviews from music critics. At Metacritic, which assigns a normalized rating out of 100 to reviews from mainstream critics, the album holds an average score of 80, based on 18 reviews, which indicates "generally positive reviews". In a mostly positive review, Pitchfork wrote that "the new songs move like anguished monologues" and that the album "takes meticulous care with each mix" while criticizing some of the "hollowed out language" Hood leans on in the more political songs. In a very positive review, the Chicago Tribune opined that "the songs brim with nuances as they merge acoustic and electric textures, somber piano and distorted washboard, melancholy string accompaniment and feedback-streaked guitars." While discussing the overarching themes of the album, they added that "if there's a thread that links the piano-led "Rosemary with a Bible and a Gun", the surging "Armageddon's Back in Town" and the hard-riffing "Slow Ride Argument", it's a sense of personal disconnection."

== Track listing ==
No.	Title	Writer(s)	Length
1.	"Rosemary with a Bible and a Gun"	Hood	3:30
2.	"Armageddon's Back in Town"	Hood	3:48
3.	"Slow Ride Argument"	Cooley	3:20
4.	"Thoughts and Prayers"	Hood	5:22
5.	"21st Century USA"	Hood	4:15
6.	"Heroin Again"	Hood	3:55
7.	"Babies in Cages"	Hood	5:34
8.	"Grievance Merchants"	Cooley	4:08
9.	"Awaiting Resurrection"	Hood	8:38
Total length:			42:24

== Personnel ==
- Patterson Hood – vocals, guitar, mandocello
- Mike Cooley – vocals, guitar
- Brad Morgan – drums
- Jay Gonzalez – keyboards, guitars and vocals
- Matt Patton – bass, bass 6 and vocals
- Kyleen King – viola and string arrangement on "Rosemary with a Bible and a Gun" and "21st Century USA"
- Patti King – violin on "Rosemary with a Bible and a Gun" and "21st Century USA"
- Cody Dickinson – electric washboard on "Babies in Cages"

== Charts ==
Chart performance for The Unraveling
Chart (2020)	Peak position
Belgian Albums (Ultratop Flanders)	81
Belgian Albums (Ultratop Wallonia)	182
Spanish Albums (Promusicae)	26
UK Albums (OCC)	36
US Billboard 200	65
US Independent Albums (Billboard)	6
US Top Rock Albums (Billboard)	4
