= English Oceans =

Studio album by Drive-By Truckers
- Released: March 4, 2014
- Genre: Southern rock
- Length: 60:27
- Label: ATO
- Producer: David Barbe

Drive-By Truckers chronology
Go-Go Boots (2011)	English Oceans (2014)	It is Great To Be Alive! (2015)

Singles from English Oceans
- 1. "Pauline Hawkins" Released: 2014

English Oceans is the tenth studio album by American rock band Drive-By Truckers, released on March 4, 2014, by ATO Records. It was produced by long-time collaborator David Barbe and recorded during two weeks in the late spring of 2013. Wes Freed again provided the album's artwork and cover. English Oceans marks the first time the Drive-By Truckers returned to the studio in four years and is one of three records the band has released with two songwriters. It's also the band's first record after bassist Matt Patton officially joined the band.

The cover art for this album is from a painting by Wes Freed based on a photograph of Abby, Sylvie, and Grace Weissman. The girls' father, Barr Weissman, made the 2009 documentary about the Truckers and the family has remained close with the band. The original painting hangs in the family's living room.

== Music and lyrics ==
While previous Drive-By Truckers records are largely dominated by guitarist Patterson Hood's songs, fellow guitarist Mike Cooley split songwriting duties with Hood for English Oceans. It also marks the first time Cooley took singing duties on a song written by Hood.

According to Chris Conaton of PopMatters, their songs are character studies set to Southern rock music like on the band's previous albums, while The Guardian journalist Dave Simpson wrote that English Oceans is "full of their familiar southern rock: soul and brass occasionally adorn storytelling songs which attempt to right wrongs and champion the worker against The Man."

== Critical reception ==
Professional ratings
Aggregate scores
Source	Rating
AnyDecentMusic?	7.2/10
Metacritic	79/100
Review scores
Source	Rating
AllMusic	4/5 stars
Cuepoint (Expert Witness)	A
The Guardian	4/5 stars
The Independent	5/5 stars
Los Angeles Times	3/4 stars
Mojo	3/5 stars
Pitchfork	6.7/10
Q	4/5 stars
Rolling Stone	3.5/5 stars
Spin	6/10

English Oceans received generally positive reviews from music critics. At Metacritic, which assigns a normalized rating out of 100 to reviews from mainstream critics, the album holds an average score of 79, based on 25 reviews. In a review for NPR, Robert Christgau called it Drive-By Truckers' first exceptional album since Brighter Than Creation's Dark (2008) because of how Cooley's songwriting is superior to that of Hood, particularly with songs such as "Shit Shots Count". Pitchfork critic Ian Cohen was also impressed by Cooley's performance, but felt that the album is too often impeded by Hood's more reserved songwriting.

At the end of the year, Christgau named English Oceans the fifth-best album of 2014 in his list for The Barnes & Noble Review.

== Commercial performance ==
The album debuted at No. 16 on the Billboard 200. and No. 4 on the Top Rock Albums on the chart dated March 22, 2014, selling 18,000 copies in the first week. The album has sold 51,000 copies in the United States as of September 2015.

== Track listing ==
No.	Title	Writer(s)	Length
1.	"Shit Shots Count"	Mike Cooley	4:10
2.	"When He's Gone"	Patterson Hood	3:41
3.	"Primer Coat"	Mike Cooley	4:25
4.	"Pauline Hawkins"	Patterson Hood	6:39
5.	"Made Up English Oceans"	Mike Cooley	3:27
6.	"The Part of Him"	Patterson Hood	4:29
7.	"Hearing Jimmy Loud"	Mike Cooley	4:45
8.	"Til He's Dead or Rises"	Patterson Hood	4:25
9.	"Hanging On"	Patterson Hood	4:01
10.	"Natural Light"	Mike Cooley	5:16
11.	"When Walter Went Crazy"	Patterson Hood	3:48
12.	"First Air of Autumn"	Mike Cooley	3:31
13.	"Grand Canyon"	Patterson Hood	7:50

== Personnel ==
- Patterson Hood - lead and backing vocals, rhythm electric and acoustic guitars, Kay/Baxendale mandocello
- Mike Cooley - lead and backing vocals, lead and rhythm electric and acoustic guitars, banjo
- Brad Morgan - drums, percussion
- Matt Patton - bass, backing vocals
- Jay Gonzalez - Hammond B-3, piano, Wurlitzer, lead and rhythm electric and acoustic guitars, backing vocals

== Charts ==
Chart (2014)	Peak position
Belgian Albums (Ultratop Flanders)	75
Dutch Albums (Album Top 100)	93
Scottish Albums (Official Charts)	22
UK Albums (Official Charts)	34
UK Independent Albums (Official Charts)	3
UK Rock & Metal Albums (OCC)	1
US Billboard 200	16
US Independent Albums (Billboard)	2
US Top Current Albums (Billboard)	16
US Top Rock Albums (Billboard)	4
