= Brighter Than Creation's Dark =

Studio album by Drive-By Truckers
- Released: January 22, 2008
- Genre: Southern rock; folk rock
- Length: 75:08
- Label: New West
- Producer: David Barbe

Drive-By Truckers chronology
A Blessing and a Curse (2006)	Brighter Than Creation's Dark (2008)	Live from Austin, TX (2009)

Professional ratings
Aggregate scores
Source	Rating
Metacritic	83/100
Review scores
Source	Rating
AllMusic	4.5/5 stars
The A.V. Club	A
Entertainment Weekly	B+
The Guardian	3/5 stars
The Independent	5/5 stars
Los Angeles Times	3.5/4 stars
MSN Music (Consumer Guide)	A
Pitchfork	8.2/10
Rolling Stone	4/5 stars
Spin	3/5 stars

Brighter Than Creation's Dark is the seventh studio album by American rock band Drive-By Truckers. It was released on January 22, 2008 in the United States.

== Background ==
Recorded during and after the acoustic Dirt Underneath Tour, the album features a more stripped down, and country based sound not seen since their second release Pizza Deliverance. The album's title is taken from a line in a Mike Cooley song entitled "Checkout Time in Vegas". Wes Freed once again provided the album artwork. According to guitarist Patterson Hood, the band's decision on the name of the album was greatly influenced by the Freed's artwork. Hood also said that the album was recorded with much ease and did not require compromises. The album was released as both a compact disc as well as a double vinyl. The band embarked on a worldwide tour entitled "The Home Front Tour" throughout the entirety of 2008 in support of Brighter Than Creation's Dark.

"Two Daughters and a Beautiful Wife" is about Bryan Harvey, singer-guitarist for a number of indie bands, most notably House of Freaks. On New Year's Day 2006, Bryan and his family were found brutally murdered in the basement of their home.

"Goode's Field Road" took many trials, recordings, and years for Hood to finish writing. Originally begun in 2000, Hood intended the track to be on The Dirty South, but at the last minute the band switched the take for "Lookout Mountain" (however, the original "mannered country" version that didn't make The Dirty South can be heard on The Fine Print). The band rerecorded the "raging primal stomp" version of "Goode's Field Road" as heard on Brighter Than Creation's Dark in one take.

"A Ghost to Most" was written in reaction to Hurricane Katrina.

In Sweden, the album charted at #37 on the official albums chart. The album also peaked at #37 on the Billboard 200 album chart in the United States. According to Hood's letters to fans, the Drive-By Truckers are exceptionally well received in Scandinavia.

== Accolades ==
Brighter Than Creation's Dark was voted the 27th best album of 2008 in the Pazz & Jop music critics poll and the poll creator, Robert Christgau, named it the third best album of the year in his own top ten.

Christgau ultimately named it his 7th favorite album of the decade in 2009.

== Track listing ==
No.	Title	Writer(s)	Length
1.	"Two Daughters and a Beautiful Wife"	Hood	3:05
2.	"3 Dimes Down"	Cooley	3:19
3.	"The Righteous Path"	Hood	4:13
4.	"I'm Sorry Huston"	Tucker	3:11
5.	"Perfect Timing"	Cooley	2:58
6.	"Daddy Needs a Drink"	Hood	3:48
7.	"Self Destructive Zones"	Cooley	4:12
8.	"Bob"	Cooley	2:15
9.	"Home Field Advantage"	Tucker	5:01
10.	"The Opening Act"	Hood	6:48
11.	"Lisa's Birthday"	Cooley	3:19
12.	"That Man I Shot"	Hood	6:03
13.	"The Purgatory Line"	Tucker	3:48
14.	"The Home Front"	Hood	3:18
15.	"Checkout Time in Vegas"	Cooley	2:41
16.	"You and Your Crystal Meth"	Hood	2:19
17.	"Goode's Field Road"	Hood	5:28
18.	"A Ghost to Most"	Cooley	4:41
19.	"The Monument Valley"	Hood	4:33

== Personnel ==
- Mike Cooley – guitar, vocals
- Patterson Hood – guitar, vocals
- John Neff – pedal steel, guitar
- Brad Morgan – drums
- Shonna Tucker – bass, vocals
- Spooner Oldham – piano, organ, Wurlitzer

== Charts ==
Chart (2008)	Peak position
Belgian Albums (Ultratop Flanders)	55
Dutch Albums (Album Top 100)	78
Norwegian Albums (VG-lista)	39
Swedish Albums (Sverigetopplistan)	37
US Billboard 200	37
US Independent Albums (Billboard)	6
US Top Rock Albums (Billboard)	11
US Top Tastemaker Albums (Billboard)	3
