= Decoration Day (album) =

Studio album by Drive-By Truckers
- Released: June 17, 2003
- Genre: Southern rock
- Length: 64:53
- Label: New West
- Producer: David Barbe

Drive-By Truckers chronology
Southern Rock Opera (2001)	Decoration Day (2003)	The Dirty South (2004)

Decoration Day is a rock album released by Drive-By Truckers in 2003. The album was recorded mostly live over two weeks at Chase Park Transduction Studios in Athens, Georgia, and was produced by noted producer and former Sugar bassist David Barbe. The album is the Truckers' fifth, including their live album Alabama Ass Whuppin', following the critically acclaimed Southern Rock Opera. The album features a more mellow, stripped down, and reserved sound compared to Southern Rock Opera's heavy hitting southern rock.

Decoration Day is the first album to feature Jason Isbell on guitar; he recorded two more albums with the band before leaving to pursue a solo career in 2007.

== Music and lyrics ==
Guitarist and songwriter Patterson Hood describes Decoration Day as being lyrically a "pretty dark" record, though he notes that the band "had so much fun making it, and I think that kind of comes through". Three of the album's songs – "Heathens", "Your Daddy Hates Me" and "Give Pretty Soon" – are referred to as being Hood's "divorce trilogy", dealing with what Hood himself refers to as the "emotional fallout" that follows divorce. He has stated that Decoration Day is "more or less ... an album about choices, good and bad, right and wrong, and the consequences of those choices." Seven of the album's tracks were first takes, while about five songs were second takes.

As is the Truckers' trademark, a number of Decoration Day's songs deal with elements of southern folklore. The title track, written by guitarist Jason Isbell, tells "a story that's rumored to be true" of two families involved in a passionate intergenerational feud which has gone on so long that few can remember why such hatred exists between them. Isbell wrote the song just three days after joining the band while touring in support of Southern Rock Opera.

Isbell's "Outfit" describes the advice given to him by his own father, advising him, among other things, to have fun but to avoid intravenous drugs, to call home for his sister's birthday, not to sing in a "fake British accent" or to make The Beatles' faux pas and claim to be "bigger than Jesus".

Furthering the focus on interfamilial relations – albeit in a much different way – is Hood's "The Deeper In", which tells the story of the only two people in the United States to be serving prison time for consensual brother/sister incest. This somewhat cryptic title is actually part of a tongue-in-cheek expression: "The closer kin, the deeper in." The story of the song appears to closely resemble the story of Patricia Teernstra Muth and her brother Allen Muth, who were convicted and served time following their conviction for incest in the case Muth v. Frank. Isbell plays electric mandolin through an Ampeg Gemini amp. "The Deeper In" signals John Neff's return to recording with the band following his absence from Southern Rock Opera.

== Critical reception ==
Professional ratings
Aggregate scores
Source	Rating
Metacritic	87/100
Review scores
Source	Rating
AllMusic	4.5/5 stars
The Austin Chronicle	4/5 stars
Blender	4/5 stars
Entertainment Weekly	B
Mojo	5/5 stars
Pitchfork	8.0/10
Rolling Stone	3/5 stars
The Rolling Stone Album Guide	4/5 stars
Spin	A
The Village Voice	A−

Having been brought to the attention of many critics through the success of Southern Rock Opera, Decoration Day was eagerly anticipated and, upon its arrival, very well received. The album garnered excellent reviews from critics like Robert Christgau of The Village Voice as well as publications such as Spin, Pitchfork Media and Rolling Stone. Decoration Day would go on to place on many publications' "Best of 2003" lists, including The Village Voice's influential Pazz & Jop poll, No Depression's "40 Best Alt. Country Albums of 2003", Rolling Stone's "Critics' Top 10 of 2003" and Amazon.com's "Top 100 Editors' Picks of 2003". The album also appeared at No. 27 on Paste's "The Best 50 Albums of the Decade" list.

== Track listing ==
Vinyl releases have tracks 1–5 on side A, 6–10 on side B, and 11–15 on side C. Side D is left blank.

No.	Title	Writer(s)	Length
1.	"The Deeper In"	Hood	3:15
2.	"Sink Hole"	Hood	3:27
3.	"Hell No, I Ain't Happy"	Hood	4:38
4.	"Marry Me"	Cooley	5:42
5.	"My Sweet Annette"	Hood	3:51
6.	"Outfit"	Isbell	4:06
7.	"Heathens"	Hood	4:47
8.	"Sounds Better in the Song"	Cooley	4:08
9.	"(Something's Got to) Give Pretty Soon"	Hood	3:38
10.	"Your Daddy Hates Me"	Hood	6:40
11.	"Careless"	Hood	2:07
12.	"When the Pin Hits the Shell"	Cooley	4:10
13.	"Do It Yourself"	Hood	3:20
14.	"Decoration Day"	Isbell	5:47
15.	"Loaded Gun in the Closet"	Cooley	5:13

== Personnel ==
=== Band ===
- Mike Cooley – guitar, vocals
- Earl Hicks – bass
- Patterson Hood – guitar, vocals
- Jason Isbell – guitar, vocals
- Brad Morgan – drums

=== Additional personnel ===
- David Barbe – producer, engineer, mixer, guitar, keyboards, Wurlitzer, upright piano
- Scott Danbom – fiddle
- Clay Leverett – harmony
- John Neff – pedal steel
- Spooner Oldham – Wurlitzer, soloist
- Shonna Tucker – upright bass (on "Sounds Better in the Song")

== Chart performance ==
Chart	Peak position
US Top Heatseekers (Billboard)	29
US Top Independent Albums (Billboard)	27
