= The Dirty South (album) =

Studio album by Drive-By Truckers
- Released: August 24, 2004
- Genre: Rock
- Length: 70:34
- Label: New West
- Producer: David Barbe

Drive-By Truckers chronology
Decoration Day (2003)	The Dirty South (2004)	A Blessing and a Curse (2006)

Professional ratings
Aggregate scores
Source	Rating
Metacritic	87/100
Review scores
Source	Rating
AllMusic	4/5 stars
The Austin Chronicle	4/5 stars
Blender	4/5 stars
The Independent	3/5 stars
Mojo	4/5 stars
Pitchfork	8.4/10 (2004); 8.7/10 (2023)
The Rolling Stone Album Guide	3.5/5 stars
Spin	A−
Uncut	4/5 stars
The Village Voice	A−

The Dirty South is the fifth album by American rock group Drive-By Truckers, released in 2004. The Dirty South is Drive-By Truckers' second concept album. Like its predecessor, Southern Rock Opera, the album examines the state of the South, and unveils the hypocrisy, irony, and tragedy that continues to exist.

== Background ==
"Where The Devil Don't Stay" was inspired by a poem by Mike Cooley's uncle Ed Cooley, and was recorded in one take.

Patterson Hood's "Tornadoes" was originally written in 1988 in reaction to the closing concert for the Adam's House Cat Nightmare Tour. The Nightmare Tour set list was composed almost exclusively of songs containing metaphors or imagery of trains, but the lack of the tour's success forced Hood and his band to abandon the concept and start afresh. Hood read an eyewitness account of the tornado in the local paper the next day and wrote "Tornadoes" after reading her statement that "it sounded like a train."

Jason Isbell's "The Day John Henry Died," retells the story of John Henry.

"Puttin' People on the Moon", written by Hood, tells the story of a town downriver from Huntsville and their "rocket envy" or economic depression due to the negative environmental and economic effects of NASA's Marshall Space Flight Center.

Cooley's "Carl Perkins' Cadillac" recounts the celebrated Sun Records, Sam Phillips, and the music industry in general.

"The Sands of Iwo Jima" recounts Hood's experiences with his great uncle while growing up in North Alabama. Questioning the veracity of the movie, his uncle answers he never saw John Wayne on the sands of Iwo Jima.

Isbell's second track on the album, "Danko/Manuel," is a departure from the usual southern gothic lyrical style written by Cooley and Hood. Originally Isbell tried to tell the story of Rick Danko, Richard Manuel, and The Band's demise, but found the scope of the concept too difficult to actually do justice to their story, and instead shifted the concept to a telling of the life of a musician through the eyes and actions of Danko and Manuel. Isbell stated that the horn parts for the song came to him in a dream.

"The Dirty South" contains a three-song suite ("The Boys From Alabama," "Cottonseed" and "The Buford Stick") about Sheriff Buford Pusser. "The Boys From Alabama" was inspired by the misconceptions and "really bad movies" of the Redneck Mafia and recounts the movie Walking Tall from a "different point of view." Hood felt that telling the story from "the bad guy's" point of view would be more interesting. Cooley's "Cottonseed" tells a story of corruption, crime, killing, greed, fixed elections, guns, drugs, prostitution and alcohol and uses subtle imagery to provide a very negative interpretation of Pusser. Hood's "The Buford Stick" completes the suite by providing examples of the negative effects of Pusser's actions while offering a less glorified view of the mythology surrounding Pusser.

Cooley's last song on the album is a story about a father who instills a love of racing in his son. "Daddy's Cup" is the only song on "The Dirty South" that does not revolve around a negative experience, instead offering a lighter touch to the overall dirty feel of the album.

Isbell has explained that "Never Gonna Change" is simply about a stubborn North Alabama man who "refuses to live in fear," which Isbell goes on to explain is rather rare.

"Lookout Mountain" was written around 1990 by Hood, and can be heard in its original incarnation on Adam's House Cat's LP Town Burned Down. It was a last minute addition to the album, beating out another Hood song entitled "Goode's Field Road." "Goode's Field Road" was eventually rerecorded for 2008's Brighter Than Creation's Dark; however, the cut that was dropped from The Dirty South managed to see the light of day on The Fine Print: A Collection of Oddities and Rarities. The version as it appears on The Dirty South was recorded in one take.

The Dirty South ends with Isbell's "Goddamn Lonely Love". Though described by Isbell as a love song, "Goddamn Lonely Love" heavily and painfully delves into the loneliness associated with love. Isbell wrote the song for Shonna Tucker.

As of February 2008, The Dirty South is Drive-By Truckers' best-selling album. The Dirty South was recorded at FAME Studios in Muscle Shoals, Alabama.

== The Complete Dirty South ==
In June 2023, the album was re-released as The Complete Dirty South. This new version included three tracks not included on the original album: "Goode's Field Road", "TVA" and "The Great Car Dealer War". Additionally, it features new vocal tracks for "Puttin' People on the Moon" and "The Sands of Iwo Jima" as well as additional remixes.

== Track listing ==
=== Original album ===
The Dirty South track listing
No.	Title	Writer(s)	Length
1.	"Where the Devil Don't Stay"	Mike Cooley	5:19
2.	"Tornadoes"	Patterson Hood	4:15
3.	"The Day John Henry Died"	Jason Isbell	3:48
4.	"Puttin' People on the Moon"	Patterson Hood	4:55
5.	"Carl Perkins' Cadillac"	Mike Cooley	5:26
6.	"The Sands of Iwo Jima"	Patterson Hood	4:12
7.	"Danko/Manuel"	Jason Isbell	5:47
8.	"The Boys from Alabama"	Patterson Hood	4:27
9.	"Cottonseed"	Mike Cooley	6:23
10.	"The Buford Stick"	Patterson Hood	4:43
11.	"Daddy's Cup"	Mike Cooley	5:53
12.	"Never Gonna Change"	Jason Isbell	5:24
13.	"Lookout Mountain"	Patterson Hood	5:02
14.	"Goddamn Lonely Love"	Jason Isbell	4:59

=== The Complete Dirty South ===
The Complete Dirty South disc one track listing
No.	Title	Writer(s)	Length
1.	"Where the Devil Don't Stay"	Mike Cooley	5:19
2.	"Tornadoes"	Patterson Hood	4:15
3.	"The Day John Henry Died"	Jason Isbell	3:48
4.	"Puttin' People on the Moon"	Patterson Hood	4:55
5.	"Goode's Field Road"	Patterson Hood	4:23
6.	"Carl Perkins' Cadillac"	Mike Cooley	5:26
7.	"TVA"	Jason Isbell	6:58
8.	"The Sands of Iwo Jima"	Patterson Hood	4:12
9.	"Danko/Manuel"	Jason Isbell	5:47

The Complete Dirty South disc two track listing
No.	Title	Writer(s)	Length
10.	"The Boys from Alabama"	Patterson Hood	4:27
11.	"The Buford Stick"	Patterson Hood	4:44
12.	"Never Gonna Change"	Jason Isbell	4:43
13.	"Cottonseed"	Mike Cooley	6:24
14.	"The Great Car Dealer War"	Patterson Hood	5:43
15.	"Daddy's Cup"	Mike Cooley	5:53
16.	"Lookout Mountain"	Patterson Hood	5:02
17.	"Goddamn Lonely Love"	Jason Isbell	4:59

== Personnel ==
- Mike Cooley – lead vocals, backing vocals, guitars, banjo on tracks 6 and 8, harmonica on track 6
- Patterson Hood – lead vocals, backing vocals, guitars, piano on tracks 2 and 14
- Jason Isbell – lead vocals, backing vocals, guitars, piano on track 2, 12 string electric Hagstrom guitar on track 5, mellophones on track 7, Fender Rhodes electric piano on track 7, Wurlitzer electric piano on track 8, B3 organ on track 14
- Brad Morgan – drums and percussion
- Shonna Tucker – bass, backing vocals
- David Barbe – production, direction, recording, piano on track 4, Fender Rhodes on track 6, B3 organ on track 8, backing vocals on track 13
- Clay Leverett – backing vocals on track 2
- The Minor Hill Singers – backing vocals on track 1
- The Minor Hill Singers are: Jason Isbell, Kimberly Morgan and Shonna Tucker
- The State Line Chain Gang – percussive auto parts on track 8

== Charts ==
Chart performance for The Dirty South
Chart (2004)	Peak position
US Billboard 200	147
US Top Independent Albums (Billboard)	14
US Top Heatseekers (Billboard)	5
