= Welcome 2 Club XIII =

Studio album by Drive-By Truckers
- Released: June 3, 2022
- Genre: Southern rock
- Length: 42:42
- Label: ATO
- Producer: David Barbe

Drive-By Truckers chronology
The New OK (2020)	Welcome 2 Club XIII (2022)

Welcome 2 Club XIII is the fourteenth studio album by American rock band Drive-By Truckers, released on June 3, 2022. The album's title references one of the venues where the band first played near Muscle Shoals, Alabama. The autobiographical nature of the album's lyrics presents a contrast to the more politically charged songs from the band's previous albums. It features vocal contributions from Schaefer Llana, Mike Mills of R.E.M., and Margo Price.

== Reception ==
The album received a score of 78 from Metacritic, indicating generally positive reviews. American Songwriter gave the album 3.5 out of 5 stars and wrote that "while Welcome 2 Club XIII has been described by the band itself as autobiographical in nature, it still manages to retain the populist appeal that drove those earlier efforts." John Amen of Beats Per Minute wrote that Welcome 2 Club XIII shows the Drive-By Truckers "temporarily setting aside their polemical blowtorches, instead mindfully venturing into vivid inventories of their own lives, choices, and karmic trajectories." He added, "Club XIII perhaps marks the end of an era, for DBT and the broader culture, suggesting that our outward-moving attention, while politically and socially significant, has to yield at some point to self-assessment." Other reviews from AllMusic, Glide Magazine, and PopMatters praised the album's raw sound and autobiographical lyrics while noting it lacks the direct political commentary of their previous three records.

Professional ratings
Review scores
Source	Rating
AllMusic	3.5/5 stars
American Songwriter	3.5/5 stars
Glide Magazine	4/5 stars
PopMatters	3.5/5 stars

== Track listing ==
No.	Title	Writer(s)	Length
1.	"The Driver"	Hood	7:00
2.	"Maria's Awful Disclosures"	Cooley	3:50
3.	"Shake and Pine"	Hood	3:45
4.	"We will never wake you up in the morning"	Hood	5:37
5.	"Welcome 2 Club XIII"	Hood	3:22
6.	"Forged in Hell and Heaven Sent"	Hood	4:44
7.	"Every Single Storied Flameout"	Cooley	3:55
8.	"Billy Ringo in the Dark"	Hood	3:45
9.	"Wilder Days"	Hood	6:37

== Personnel ==
- Patterson Hood – vocals, guitar, mandocello
- Mike Cooley – vocals, guitar
- Brad Morgan – drums
- Jay Gonzalez – keyboards, guitars and vocals
- Matt Patton – bass, bass 6 and vocals
- Schaefer Lana – background vocals on "The Driver" and "Wilder Days"
- Mike Mills – background vocals on "Maria's Awful Disclosures"
- Margo Price – background vocals on "Forged in Hell and Heaven Sent"
- Jeremy Ivey – harmonica
- Scott Danbom – fiddle
- Randall Bramblett – tenor sax
- Tom Ryan – baritone sax
- J.R. Beckwith – trumpet
