= Drive-By Truckers =

American rock band

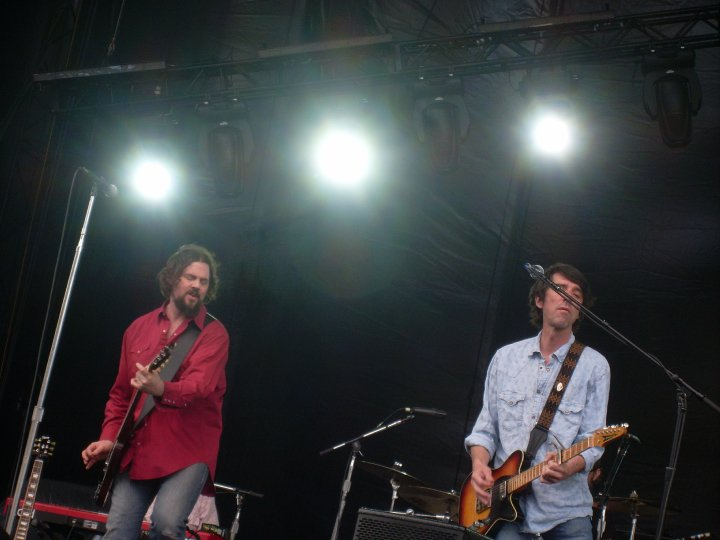
- Drive-By Truckers performing at The Gorge Amphitheatre, Washington, during the Sasquatch! Music Festival in 2010

Background information
- Origin: Athens, Georgia, U.S.
- Genres: Southern rock; country rock; alternative country; rock and roll; roots rock
- Years active: 1996–present
- Labels: ATO; MapleMusic; New West; Lost Highway; Play It Again Sam; Ghostmeat; Soul Dump
- Members: Patterson Hood; Mike Cooley; Brad Morgan; Jay Gonzalez; Matt Patton
- Past members: Jason Isbell; Spooner Oldham; John Neff; Shonna Tucker; Earl Hicks; Rob Malone; Matt Lane; Adam Howell; Barry Sell
- Website: drivebytruckers.com

Drive-By Truckers are an American rock band based in Athens, Georgia. Two of five current members (Patterson Hood and Mike Cooley) are originally from the Shoals region of northern Alabama and met as roommates at the University of North Alabama. The group also has roots in Richmond, Virginia.

The band currently consists of Mike Cooley (lead vocals, guitar, banjo), Patterson Hood (lead vocals, guitar), Brad Morgan (drums), Jay Gonzalez (keys, guitar, accordion, backing vocals), and Matt Patton (bass guitar, backing vocals). The line-up has undergone multiple changes since the band's formation, with Cooley and Hood serving as the sole constants throughout. The band's constant touring has developed a dedicated following.

The group received critical acclaim with their third album Southern Rock Opera (2001), then, after being joined by guitarist Jason Isbell, achieved further acclaim with Decoration Day (2003) and a commercial breakthrough with The Dirty South (2004). Isbell departed the group after the release of their sixth album A Blessing and a Curse (2006).

== History ==
=== 1996–1999: Early days ===
Drive-By Truckers was cofounded by Patterson Hood (son of bassist David Hood of the Muscle Shoals Rhythm Section) and longtime friend, former roommate, and musical partner Mike Cooley in Athens, Georgia, in 1996. The two had played in various other bands including Adam's House Cat, which was chosen as a top-10 Best Unsigned Band by a Musician contest in the late 1980s. Adam's House Cat recordings, entitled Town Burned Down were released in September 2018 via ATO Records. After the demise of Adam's House Cat, Cooley and Hood performed as a duo under the name Virgil Kane. They eventually started a new band, Horsepussy, with bassist-vocalist Adam Howell (later to join DBT) and Aaron Bryant (brother of DBT webmaster Jenn Bryant) before splitting for a few years. During this split, Hood moved to Athens and began forming what would become Drive-By Truckers, "with the intent of luring Cooley back into the fold".

The band's original lineup was fluid, but it most often included Hood, Cooley, and Howell, along with drummer Matt Lane, pedal steel player John Neff, and mandolin player Barry Sell. They released their first album Gangstabilly in 1998. With Hood and Cooley sometimes playing mandolin and banjo instead of guitar, and Howell playing double bass. After recording their first album, the band added a third guitarist/vocalist, Rob Malone. By the second album, Pizza Deliverance, released in 1999, Howell had left, Malone switched to bass, and Sell had left the band. Neff was also listed as a guest rather than a member, although he plays on much of the album. Hood dominated the songwriting and lead vocals in these early records, but Cooley, Howell, and Malone also contributed songs, with Cooley's songwriting share increasing notably by the second album.

Following their second release, Lane was replaced by drummer Brad Morgan, who had already filled in for Lane during some of the band's shows. Morgan went on to become the band's other constant member along with Hood and Cooley. With Neff also having declined to remain a full-time band contributor, Hood and Cooley were left as the only original members. The band then embarked on a nationwide tour as a four-piece band, resulting in a live album entitled Alabama Ass Whuppin' (released in 2000 by Second Heaven Records, re-released in 2002 by Terminus Records and again in 2013 on ATO Records).

=== 2000–2001: Southern Rock Opera ===
After three years on the road, a tight-knit group of musicians had emerged. Malone had switched back to guitar, giving the band a three-member guitar army like Lynyrd Skynyrd, and Earl Hicks, a friend who had previously been involved in the band's production, took over the bass slot. They then began work on 2001's double album, Southern Rock Opera.

The album weaves the history of Lynyrd Skynyrd into a narrative about a fictitious rock band called Betamax Guillotine, whose story unfolds within the context of the South during the 1970s. Southern Rock Opera was originally released independently on Drive-By Truckers' own Soul Dump Records on September 12, 2001, and garnered praise from fans and critics alike. To meet the new demand brought on by, among other things, a four-star review in Rolling Stone, Southern Rock Opera was reissued by Mercury and Lost Highway Records in July 2002. Soon after, Drive-By Truckers were named Band of the Year by No Depression.

While Drive-By Truckers were touring in support of Southern Rock Opera, the band ran into a problem when they were left with only two guitarists (Cooley and Hood) following the departure of Rob Malone in late 2001. The band added fellow Alabamian guitarist and songwriter Jason Isbell to their line-up as the band's third guitarist. During his five years with Drive-By Truckers, Isbell's compositions became as highly praised as those of Cooley and Hood.

=== 2001–2006: With Jason Isbell ===
After signing a new deal with Austin-based record label New West, Drive-By Truckers set about recording the follow-up to Southern Rock Opera. The result was 2003's Decoration Day, which like its predecessor, received much critical praise. It is another concept album, containing characters who are faced with hard decisions about marriage, incest, break-ups, revenge, murder, and suicide. The album features an eclectic mix of the band's newer rootsy, hard-rocking sound with some of their older alt-country sound. Former member John Neff returned as a guest to play pedal steel on about half the album, although he did not tour with the band for the album.

After years of producing and playing with Drive-By Truckers, bassist Earl Hicks left the band on December 22, 2003. Hicks was immediately replaced by studio bassist Shonna Tucker, then-wife of guitarist Jason Isbell. Tucker had previously guested on Decoration Day, playing upright bass on the Cooley-penned track "Sounds Better in the Song".

In 2004, Drive-By Truckers released yet another concept album entitled The Dirty South, which further explored the mythology of the South, with songs focusing on Sam Phillips and Sun Records, John Henry, and a three-song suite about Sheriff Buford Pusser. With Cooley and Isbell each contributing 4 songs on the 14-song set, it was the band's first album for which Hood did not write the majority of songs.

After touring throughout 2004 and 2005, Drive-By Truckers found their way to the Fidelitorium Recording Studio in Forsyth County, North Carolina, during late 2005. These recording sessions, once again produced by David Barbe, resulted in the band's seventh LP, A Blessing and a Curse. Released on April 18, 2006, A Blessing and a Curse showcased Drive-By Truckers' ability to branch out into new territory, and can be seen as the band's attempt at shaking labeling by critics, detractors, fans, and followers, particularly the Southern rock label that has haunted the band since Southern Rock Opera. The album sounds less like Lynyrd Skynyrd, and more closely resembles the bare-bones British rock of the early 1970s such as The Rolling Stones and Faces. Tom Petty, Blue Öyster Cult, and Neil Young's influence on the band's sound is more prominent on this album, as well.

On September 1, 2009, Drive-By Truckers released a collection of B-sides and rarities entitled The Fine Print: A Collection of Oddities and Rarities which were recorded during the Decoration Day and Dirty South sessions. Though released after he left the band, the album includes two tracks written by Jason Isbell.

=== 2006–2009: Changing lineup ===
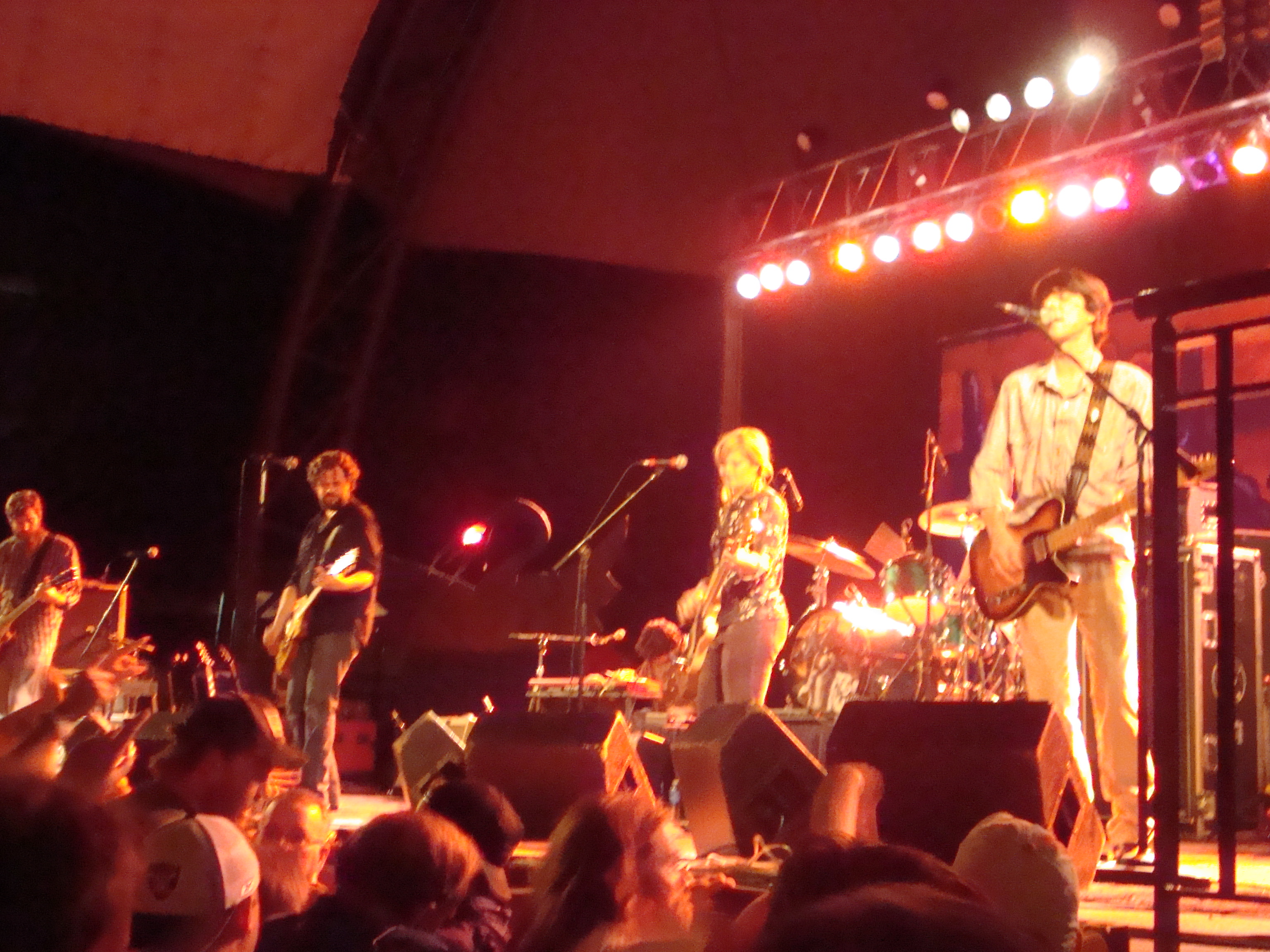
Drive-By Truckers in 2008

In 2006, Drive-By Truckers reunited, both on-stage and on-record, with Athens-based, Savannah-born pedal steel guitarist John Neff. Neff had been featured on one song on A Blessing and a Curse. During the next year, Neff began touring with the band as an unofficial sixth member.

On April 5, 2007, Jason Isbell announced that he was no longer a member of the band. The following day, Patterson Hood confirmed the break on the official site. In his letter to the fans, Hood described the parting of ways as "amicable" and expressed the hope that fans would continue to support Drive-By Truckers, as well as Isbell's solo efforts. In the same letter, Hood announced that Neff would become a full-time member, playing both guitar and pedal steel. Six years after Isbell's departure from the band, he revealed the reported "amicab[ility]" of the split was a charade and that he had been forced out. Because his excessive drinking and drug use had made Isbell unreliable, Hood had asked him to take a break from the band; upon Isbell's refusal, Cooley informed Isbell "that isn't going to work for us".

Shortly after Isbell's departure, on April 20, 2007, Patterson Hood announced via the band's website that a longtime friend of the Hood family, Spooner Oldham, would be joining the band playing keyboard for a string of acoustic performances called The Dirt Underneath Tour. This stripped-down tour set the writing mood and style for the band's next release, 2008's Brighter Than Creation's Dark, a far more "swampy" and country record than its predecessor. Brighter Than Creation's Dark went to number 37 on the Billboard 200 album chart and was billed as a gothic masterpiece. Spooner Oldham contributed to the recording of the album, and toured with the band in support of the record. The record boasted 19 tracks, clocked in at over 75 minutes (so the record's vinyl format was released as a double album), and features the first song contributions from bassist Shonna Tucker. Keyboardist/backing vocalist Jay Gonzalez went on to tour with the band once Oldham stopped at the end of Brighter Than Creation's Dark's Home Front Tour.

On July 7, 2009, New West Records released the band's second official live album and DVD called Live From Austin TX. Material from Brighter Than Creation's Dark made up the majority of the mostly acoustic set-list. This was the first official release featuring Jay Gonzalez as the official sixth band member. Hood later recalled this recording as "absolutely the best filmed performance our band has ever had".

=== 2009–2011: Departing New West Records ===
After being released from New West Records, the Drive-By Truckers entered the studio throughout periods of 2009 and emerged with two albums' worth of material. The songs were divided between The Big To Do (2010) and the Drive-By Truckers "R&B Murder Album" Go-Go Boots (2011). The Big To-Do further brought media attention to the band, resulting in their highest chart success, appearances on the Late Show with David Letterman and Late Night with Jimmy Fallon, and a scheduled tour opening for Tom Petty & the Heartbreakers. During a performance on the Late Show with David Letterman in June 2011, the band played a cover of Eddie Hinton's song "Everybody Needs Love" and were asked by Letterman to play an encore. Along with John Hiatt, English band The Heavy and Alabama-based St. Paul and The Broken Bones, they are the only musical act ever asked to play an encore on his show. As the band's contract with New West Records expired after The Fine Print was released, the band signed and released The Big To-Do and Go-Go Boots on ATO Records.

On April 17, 2010, the band released a single penned by Mike Cooley to commemorate Record Store Day. "Your Woman Is a Living Thing"/"Just Maybe" is the only record the Drive-By Truckers have released solely in a vinyl format. Digital downloads of the single can now be found on the band's website, as well as Facebook. Based on the success of the single, the band decided to release a limited edition (2,500 copies) special 10-inch 45 with two new songs, "The Thanksgiving Filter"/"Used to Be a Cop", on Black Friday of 2010. Both songs also appear on the album Go-Go Boots.

New West Records released Ugly Buildings, Whores, and Politicians: Greatest Hits 1998–2009 on August 2, 2011. The announcement was immediately met with mixed receptions by fans.

=== 2011–2017: More lineup changes, English Oceans and American Band ===
On December 5, 2011, Patterson Hood announced via Facebook that bassist Shonna Tucker had left the Drive-By Truckers. He did not cite any of Tucker's reasons for leaving the band and merely stated, "we all love and respect her and wish her all of the best in everything she sets out for." David Barbe replaced Tucker for their subsequent shows until Matt Patton of The Dexateens joined the band for their spring 2012 tour. John Neff also departed on December 27, 2012; no third guitar replacement was announced, and all tours during 2013 consisted of Cooley and Hood on guitar with Gonzalez alternating between keyboard and guitar. Since that time, Gonzalez has continued to play both keyboards and guitar, allowing the band to duplicate their trademark three-guitar sound when necessary.

During the Drive-By Truckers' 2013 New Year's Eve show at the 9:30 Club in Washington, D.C., an expanded vinyl release of their first live album, Alabama Ass Whuppin' was announced to be released in 2013.

On August 3, 2013, Hood's Instagram account revealed the band had begun recording their next album at Chase Park Transduction in Athens. Released on March 4, 2014, English Oceans showed that Gonzalez had become an official member of the band. Reduced to five members again, the band showcased a more simple and direct hard-rocking style on the album. The album debuted at number 16 on the Billboard charts, which represented the best charting of their career.

The band released no new studio album in 2015, but instead released a sprawling live album entitled It's Great to Be Alive. The album was recorded over a three-night run at the Fillmore in San Francisco, on November 20, 21 and 22, 2014.

The band released their 11th album, American Band, on September 30, 2016. The album featured the same line-up as English Oceans, and featured the most politically oriented lyrics of the band's career. A 2017 article in Australia's Overland literary magazine suggested, with reference to American Band, that "no-one in the modern era is making stronger protest music than this Athens, Georgia band". They announced a tour in support of the record, the Darkened Flags Tour, in June of the same year.

In November 2017, they released the politically charged single "The Perilous Night", showing a continuation of their increased focus on protest songs.

=== 2018–present: The Unraveling, The New OK and Welcome 2 Club XIII ===
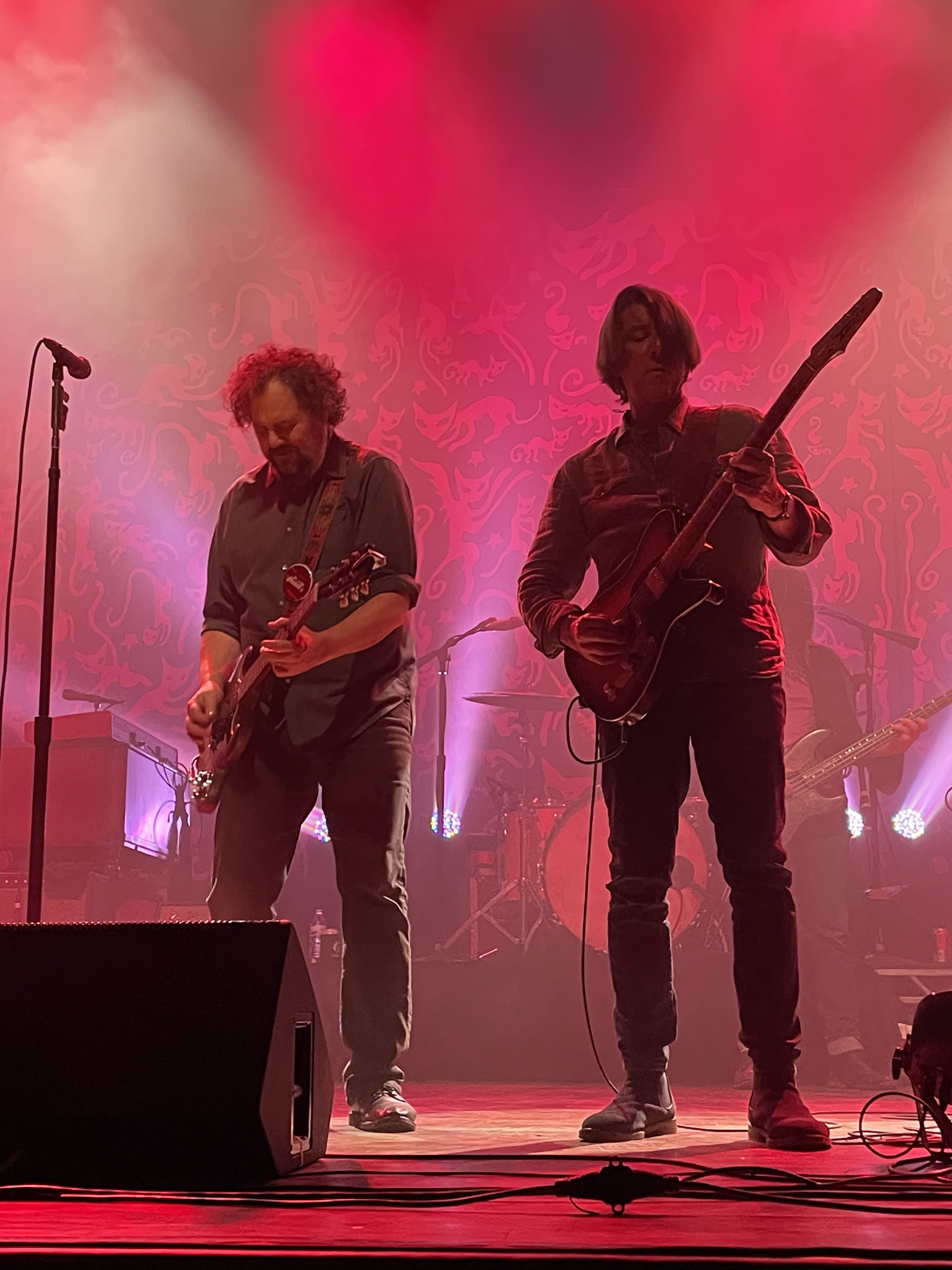
Patterson Hood and Mike Cooley of Drive-By Truckers performing in St. Louis on March 18, 2023.

On September 11, 2018, the band shared a photo via their Instagram page alluding that they were currently working on their 12th studio album. The album, titled The Unraveling, was released on January 31, 2020, making it the longest gap between studio albums for the band so far.

On June 17, 2020, NPR published an opinion piece by Patterson Hood, wherein he apologized for the band's name and called it "a drunken joke that was never intended to be in rotation and reckoned with two-and-a-half decades later".

On September 30, 2020, just eight months after the release of The Unraveling, the band announced their thirteenth studio album, The New OK. It was made available on all streaming platforms the following Friday.

On April 12, 2022, the band announced their fourteenth studio album, Welcome 2 Club XIII and released the album's title track as the first promotional single. The title derives from the venue where founding members Patterson Hood and Mike Cooley performed at the start of their careers.

On March 21, 2024, Drive-By Truckers announced the "Southern Rock Opera Revisited 2024 Tour" which will feature full-length live performances of that album in the summer and autumn of 2024 for, per the band, "very likely the last time."

Jason Isbell reunited with Drive-By Truckers at Shoals Fest, held at McFarland Park in Florence, Alabama on October 3, 2026, for a one-off performance of the album Decoration Day in full for the first time. The occasion also marked the first time Isbell performed a full set with the band since their split in 2007.

== Work with others ==
In 2007, Drive-By Truckers backed up Bettye LaVette on her comeback album The Scene of the Crime, which was released on September 25 on Anti Records. Scene of the Crime was mostly recorded at FAME Studios in Muscle Shoals, Alabama. On it, LaVette transforms country and rock songs written by Willie Nelson, Elton John, and Don Henley, among others, into devastating mini-dramas. Scene of the Crime was nominated for a Grammy Award for "Best Contemporary Blues Album" and landed on numerous "Best of 2007" lists. Drive-By Truckers frontman Patterson Hood produced the album alongside LaVette. The album also features one song cowritten by LaVette and Hood.

Drive-By Truckers backed up Booker T. Jones on his instrumental album Potato Hole, which was released on April 21, 2009. Neil Young also contributed over-dubbed guitar work to the album; the Drive-By Truckers and he never met in studio. Potato Hole features a re-recording of the Cooley penned track "Space City", which originally was released on the album A Blessing And A Curse. The band performed with Jones as "Booker T and the DBTs" at the Bonnaroo Music and Arts Festival on June 14, 2009. On January 31, 2010, Potato Hole won the Best Pop Instrumental Album award at the 52nd Grammy Awards.

In late 2009, Barr Weissman released a documentary on the Drive-By Truckers entitled The Secret To A Happy Ending. The film follows the band over three particularly straining years of their career, and captures their near break up, as well as the departure of Jason Isbell from the band.

== Musical style ==
Drive-By Truckers' musical style has incorporated elements of rock and roll, Southern rock, country, punk rock, cowpunk, pop punk, blues, soul, Southern soul and R&B. Cited influences on the band include The Clash, Richard Hell and The Voidoids, The Jim Carroll Band, Grandmaster Flash and the Furious Five, Goodie Mob, OutKast, Loretta Lynn, George Jones, Tammy Wynette, Ferlin Husky, Lefty Frizzell, Hank Snow, Hank Williams Sr., Hank Williams Jr., Red Sovine, Red Foley, Merle Haggard, Tom T. Hall, Townes Van Zandt, Neil Young and Lynyrd Skynyrd. The band's music has been classified as Southern rock, country rock, rock and roll, alternative country, R&B, arena rock, country, emo country, folk rock, hard rock, indie rock, neo-Southern rock, post-cowpunk, roots rock, Southern Gothic and Southern soul.

Drive-By Truckers' lyrics are noted for expressing the progressive political views of the band, particularly band member and songwriter Patterson Hood. Jonathan Bernstein, writing for Rolling Stone, described American Band as the group's most politically charged album, describing the songs as "blunt, pissed-off Trump-era anthems", nearly half which deal with gun violence. The song "Ramon Casiano" is about the little known story of gun rights advocate and former NRA leader Harlon Carter, who shot and killed a 15-year-old Hispanic boy in 1931, but escaped incarceration. Hood wrote "What it Means" in response to the deaths of Trayvon Martin and Michael Brown, unarmed black teenagers whose killings sparked the Black Lives Matter movement. “Surrender Under Protest,” “Ever South,” and “Guns of Umpqua” examine generations of racial injustice in a country that "shoots first and asks questions later." "Once They Banned Imagine" discusses censorship of art in times of crisis, particularly after the September 11 attacks. Band member and songwriter Mike Cooley recalled that "After the 9/11 attacks, Clear Channel put out that list of songs that their stations shouldn’t play. I couldn’t get my head around the notion that John Lennon’s "Imagine" was on that list, that it was something we didn’t need to hear at a time when it was exactly what we needed to hear. The Red Scare, the War on Crime, the War on Terrorism, they’re just excuses for cracking down on anything the establishment finds objectionable.” The follow-up album, The Unraveling, continues the band's political songwriting, with "Thoughts and Prayers" and "Babies in Cages" discussing the issues of gun violence and the Trump administration family separation policy directly. The New OK contained songs written in response to the Black Lives Matter protests in Portland, Oregon and the COVID-19 pandemic.

=== Online presence and artwork ===
The band's online presence was created in 1996, and is still maintained by long-time friend Jenn Bryant. It has been credited with helping the band gain momentum. The band also began to use another long-time friend, Wes Freed, to produce the band's signature visual style with his cover art and posters. Freed continued his collaborative work with them until his death in 2022. In March 2014, the newly debuted English Oceans album cover was named Album Art of the Month by Consequence of Sound editor Dan Caffrey. However, the band's constant touring and lauded live shows largely developed their dedicated following.

== Band members ==
Current members

- Patterson Hood – lead vocals, guitar, mandolin (1996–present)
- Mike Cooley – guitar, lead vocals, banjo, harmonica (1996–present)
- Brad Morgan – drums (1999–present)
- Jay Gonzalez – keyboards, guitar, accordion, musical saw, backing vocals (2008–present)
- Matt Patton – bass, backing and occasional lead vocals (2012–present)

Additional personnel

- David Barbe – production, engineering, guitar, bass, keyboards, backing vocals (1998–present)

Former members

- Adam Howell – bass, backing vocals (1996–1999)
- Matt Lane – drums (1996–1999)
- John Neff – guitar, pedal steel guitar, backing vocals (1996–1999, 2003, 2006–2012)
- Barry Sell – mandolin, backing vocals (1996–1999)
- Earl Hicks – bass (1999–2003)
- Rob Malone – guitar, bass, lead vocals (1999–2001)
- Jason Isbell – guitar, keyboards, lead vocals (2001–2007; guest 2025)
- Shonna Tucker – bass, vocals, guitar, keyboards (2003–2011)
- Spooner Oldham – keyboards (2003, 2007–2008)

=== Touring/session alumni ===
- Jyl Freed – backing vocals (2000)
- Kelly Hogan – backing vocals (2000)
- Amy Pike – backing vocals (2000)
- Anne Richmond Boston – backing vocals (2000)
- Scott Danbom – fiddle (2003)
- Clay Leverett – backing vocals (2003)
- Adam Courson — trumpet, horn arrangements (2013)

== Discography ==
=== Studio albums ===
Title	Album details	Peak chart positions								Sales
Title	Album details	US	US Rock	US Indie	BEL	NL	NOR	SWE	UK	Sales
Gangstabilly	Released: March 24, 1998; Label: Soul Dump Records	—	—	—	—	—	—	—	—	
Pizza Deliverance	Released: May 11, 1999; Label: Soul Dump	—	—	—	—	—	—	—	—	
Southern Rock Opera	Released: September 12, 2001; Label: Soul Dump	—	—	—	—	—	—	—	—	
Decoration Day	Released: June 17, 2003; Label: New West	—	—	27	—	—	—	—	—	
The Dirty South	Released: August 24, 2004; Label: New West	147	—	14	—	—	—	—	—	
A Blessing and a Curse	Released: April 18, 2006; Label: New West	50	—	3	—	—	15	—	—	
Brighter Than Creation's Dark	Released: January 22, 2008; Label: New West	37	11	6	55	78	39	37	—	
The Big To-Do	Released: March 16, 2010; Label: ATO	22	6	1	83	—	23	31	61	
Go-Go Boots	Released: February 14, 2011; Label: ATO	35	8	8	69	88	29	43	58	
English Oceans	Released: March 4, 2014; Label: ATO	16	4	2	75	93	—	—	34	US: 51,000
American Band	Released: September 30, 2016; Label: ATO	26	8	5	54	66	40	50	29	
The Unraveling	Released: January 31, 2020; Label: ATO	65	4	6	81	—	—	—	36	
The New OK	Released: October 2, 2020; Label: ATO	—	—	—	—	—	—	—	—	
Welcome 2 Club XIII	Released: June 3, 2022; Label: ATO	—	—	—	—	—	—	—	—	
"—" denotes releases that did not chart

=== Live albums ===
- Alabama Ass Whuppin' (2000, re-released in 2013)
- The Dirty South Live at the 40 Watt (2004) (DVD)
- Live from Austin, TX (2009)
- Live at Third Man (2011) (Limited edition vinyl-only release)
- It's Great To Be Alive! (2015) No. 111 US
- Mike Cooley, Patterson Hood and Jason Isbell Live at the Shoals Theatre, June 15, 2014 (2020)
- Live @ Plan 9 (Recorded July 13, 2006; released 2021)

=== Collections ===
- The Fine Print: A Collection of Oddities and Rarities (2009)
- Ugly Buildings, Whores, and Politicians: Greatest Hits 1998–2009 (2011)

=== Singles and EPs ===
- "Bulldozers and Dirt"/"Nine Bullets" (1996)
- "Never Gonna Change" (2004)
- "Aftermath USA" (2006)
- "A Blessing and a Curse" (2006)
- "Self-Destructive Zones" (2008)
- "A Ghost to Most" (2008)
- "The Righteous Path" (2008)
- "This Fucking Job" (2010, retitled "Working This Job" for radio and music video channels)
- "Your Woman Is a Livin' Thing"/"Just Maybe" (2010)
- "The Thanksgiving Filter"/"Used to Be a Cop" (2010)
- "Sometimes Late at Night EP" (2011)
- "Pauline Hawkins" (2014)
- "Made Up English Oceans" (2014)
- "Dragon Pants EP" (2014) (Limited Edition)
- "What It Means" (2016)
- "Armageddon's Back in Town" (2019)
- "The Unraveling"/"Sarah's Flame" (2020)
- "The New OK" (2020)
- "Welcome 2 Club XIII" (2022)
- "Every Single Storied Flameout" (2022)
- "The Driver" (2022)

=== Filmography ===
- The Secret to a Happy Ending: A Documentary About the Drive-By Truckers (2011)
