= Pizza Deliverance =

Studio album by Drive-By Truckers
- Released: May 11, 1999
- Recorded: January 16–20, 1999
- Genre: Southern rock
- Length: 66:26
- Labels: Souldump; Ghostmeat
- Producers: Earl Hicks; Drive-By Truckers

Drive-By Truckers chronology
Gangstabilly (1998)	Pizza Deliverance (1999)	Alabama Ass Whuppin' (2000)

Professional ratings
Review scores
Source	Rating
AllMusic	3/5 stars
Christgau's Consumer Guide	A−
The Encyclopedia of Popular Music	3/5 stars
The New Rolling Stone Album Guide	3.5/5 stars
Pitchfork	7.7/10

Pizza Deliverance is the second album released by Alabama rock band Drive-By Truckers, released in 1999. It was recorded in five days at Patterson Hood's house. The album was mixed by Andy LeMaster. The album cover art was created by Jim Stacy. The album was re-released by New West Records on January 25, 2005 along with the band's first studio effort, Gangstabilly.

Hood dedicated the album to Arthur Alexander, Sam Phillips and Jerry Wexler.

After the release of Pizza Deliverance the band began touring some 150 dates in as little as six months. It was during the beginning of the tour that Brad Morgan replaced Matt Lane on drums due to Lane's decision to focus more on his own band, The Possibilities. Most of Drive-By Trucker's breakthrough album, Southern Rock Opera, was written while the band toured in support of Pizza Deliverance.

Pizza Deliverance saw guitarist Mike Cooley's first major contributions to the band (aside from Gangstabilly's "Panties In Your Purse") as his songwriting and lyrical style continued to develop. An alternate (and more electric) version of Cooley's "Uncle Frank" was recorded during The Dirty South sessions and can be heard on The Fine Print: A Collection of Oddities and Rarities.

== Track listing ==
1. Bulldozers and Dirt – 4:29 (Hood)
2. Nine Bullets – 4:05 (Hood)
3. Uncle Frank – 5:29 (Cooley)
4. Too Much Sex (Too Little Jesus) – 3:16 (Hood)
5. Box of Spiders – 3:30 (Hood)
6. One of These Days – 5:15 (Cooley)
7. Margo and Harold – 4:51 (Hood)
8. The Company I Keep – 7:02 (Hood)
9. The President's Penis Is Missing – 4:12 (Hood)
10. Tales Facing Up – 5:03 (Hood)
11. Love Like This – 5:23 (Cooley)
12. Mrs. Dubose – 5:40 (Malone)
13. Zoloft – 3:17 (Hood)
14. The Night G.G. Allin Came to Town – 4:50 (Hood)

== Personnel ==
=== Band ===
- Mike Cooley – lyrics, guitar, banjo, bass, harmonica, vocals
- Patterson Hood – lyrics, guitar, mandolin, bass, vocals
- Rob Malone – lyrics, guitar, bass, vocals
- Matt Lane – drums

=== Guest performers ===
- John Neff - pedal steel guitar
- Barry Sell - mandolin on "Margo and Harold"
- Earl Hicks - snare drum on "Love Like This" and "Mrs. Dubose"
- Adam Howell - upright bass on "Margo and Harold" and "Zoloft"
