= Jay Gonzalez (musician) =

Musician from Athens, Georgia

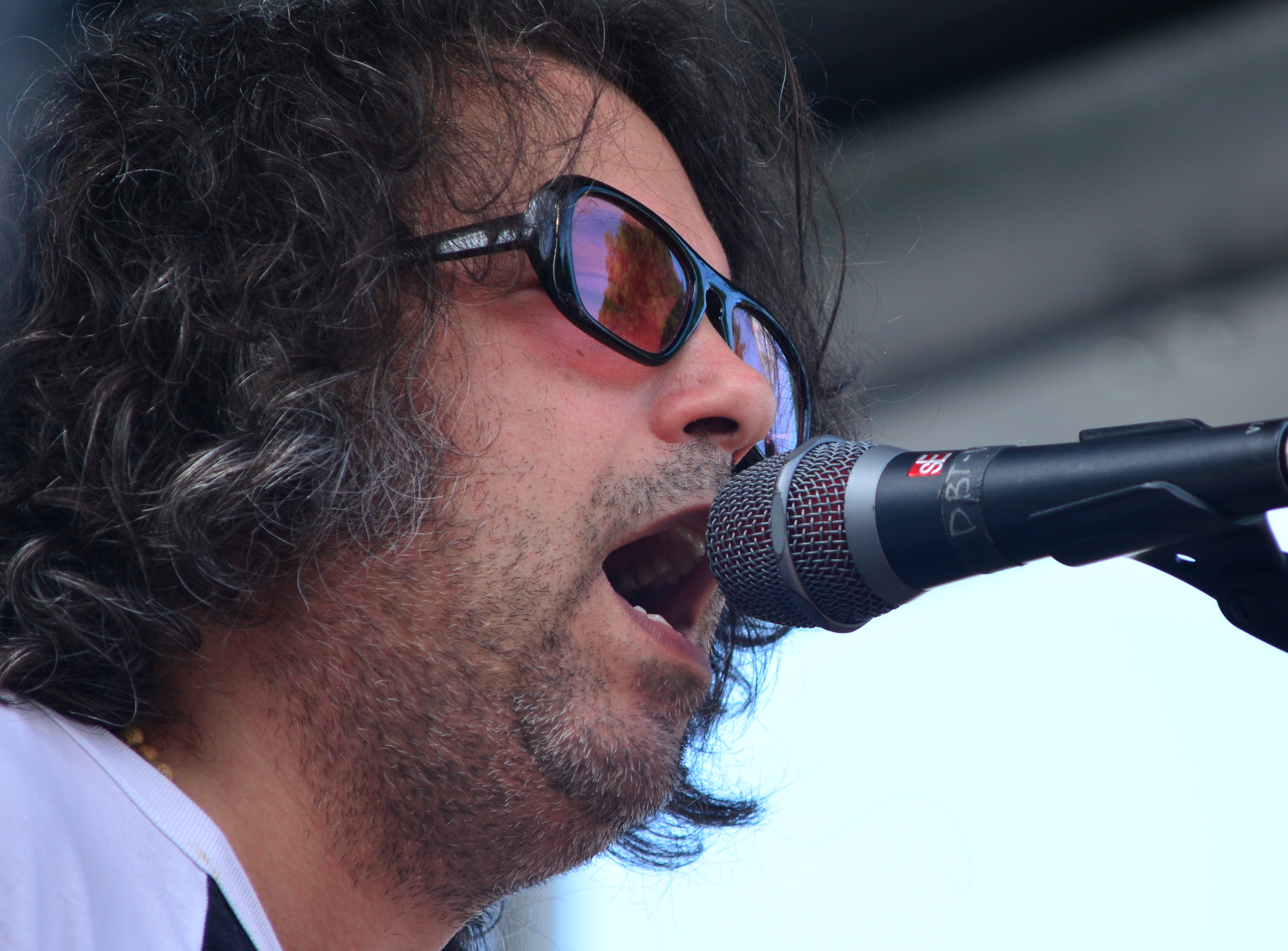
- Jay Gonzalez, 2022
- Born: Shenorock, New York
- Occupation: musician
- Known for: Drive-by Truckers

Jay Gonzalez (born 1973) is a musician from Athens, Georgia known for playing keyboards and guitar in the Drive-By Truckers. Gonzalez joined the band in 2008 and also produces solo music.

He has been in the bands Loveapple in the 1990s, the Possibilities and Nutria in the early 2000s, and also plays in the band Cut Buffer. He is a fan of 70's power pop music which is evidenced in his solo album Mess of Happiness. His 2012 solo album Bitter Suite is five songs that all flow together as one musical composition.

== Equipment ==
Gonzalez plays a 1968 Gibson SG Special with the original P-90s and Vibrola tailpiece. He uses an Ace of Clubs combo amp with two channels—one more British-style, and the other more American—plus reverb. His effects board contains a TC Electronics PolyTune tuner, which feeds into an MXR Micro Amp, a modded DOD FX52 Classic Fuzz, and a Xotic EP Booster, with additional effects provided by a TC Electronic Flashback delay and a Boss RT-20 Rotary Ensemble.

== Personal life ==
Gonzalez grew up in Shenorock, New York and started out taking piano lessons as a seven year old, starting guitar at the age of 14. He graduated from Somers High School and studied at SUNY, Fredonia. He is married to Katey and they have one son.

== Discography ==
=== Albums ===
Title	Details
Mess Of Happiness	Release date: January 12, 2012; Label: Middle Brow Records
Back To The Hive	Release date: March 7, 2021; Label: Middle Brow Records

=== Extended plays ===
Title	Details
The Bitter Suite	Release date: April 7, 2015; Label: Middle Brow Records
