= Shonna Tucker =

American singer-songwriter

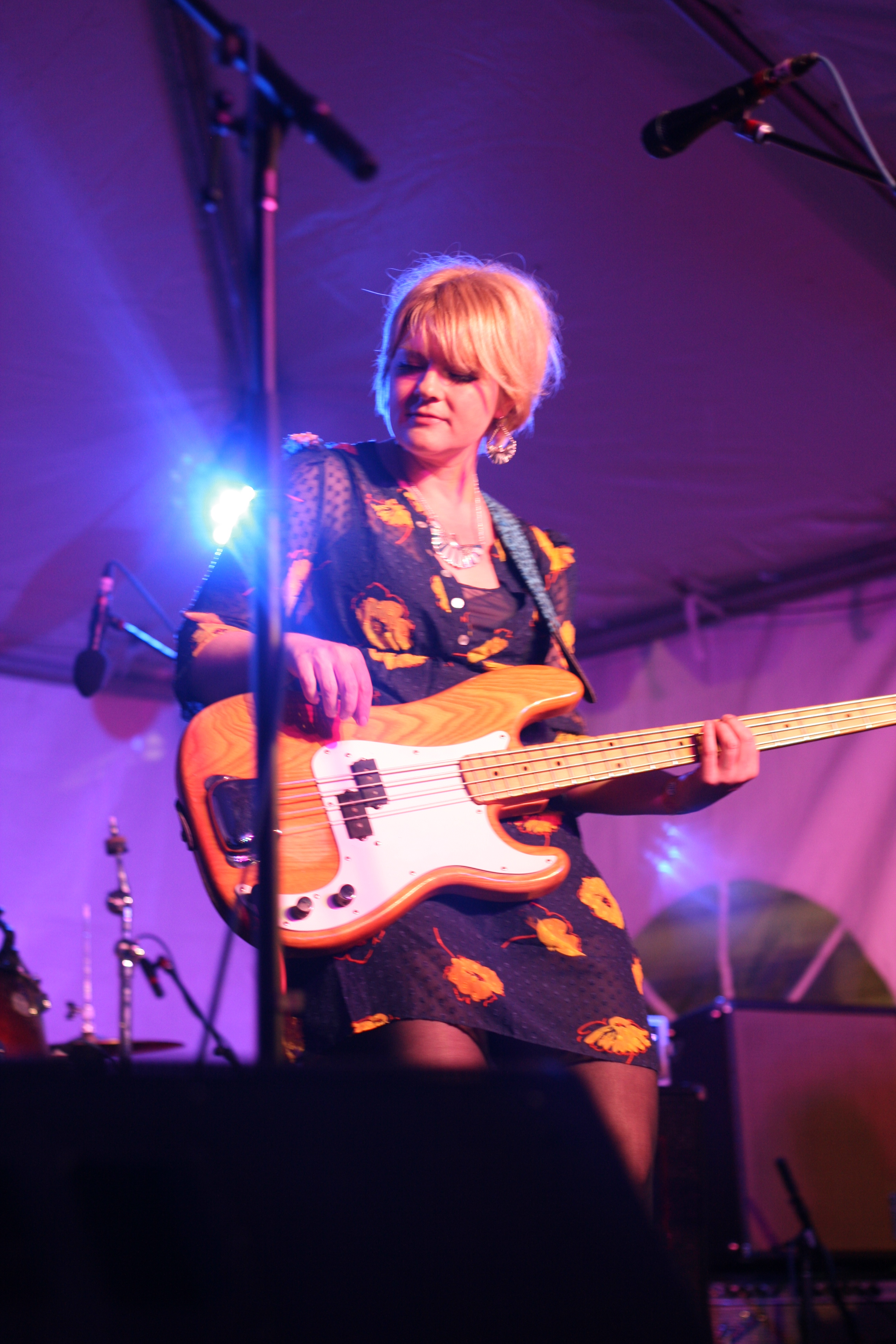
- Tucker in 2013

Background information
- Born: February 27, 1978 (age 48); Killen, Alabama, U.S.
- Genres: Southern rock; country rock; rock and roll
- Occupations: Singer-songwriter; bassist
- Instruments: Bass guitar; vocals; guitar
- Years active: 2003–present
- Label: Sweet Nectar Records
- Formerly of: Drive-By Truckers
- Spouse: Jason Isbell (m. 2002; div. 2007)
- Website: Official website

Shonna Tucker is an American bassist and songwriter from Killen, Alabama, near Muscle Shoals.

== Background ==
Tucker grew up in Killen, Alabama, receiving her first bass at age 12, a gift from her father. She describes her musical education as "mostly playing along with Creedence Clearwater Revival tapes".

== With the Drive-by Truckers ==
Tucker joined the Athens, Georgia-based Drive-By Truckers in 2003, replacing original bassist Earl Hicks. Tucker had previously played upright bass on the Truckers' album Decoration Day. She played bass on their next two records, The Dirty South and A Blessing and a Curse, before contributing her first songs on 2008's Brighter Than Creation's Dark. She wrote three songs on that record: "I'm Sorry, Huston", "Home Field Advantage", and "The Purgatory Line". She also joined the band backing up Booker T. Jones on his record Potato Hole and Bettye LaVette on her record The Scene of the Crime. For most of her career in the band, she was married to guitarist Jason Isbell, though the two eventually divorced. She also performed on Isbell's first solo album Sirens of the Ditch.

== Solo career ==
Patterson Hood announced Tucker's departure from the band in December 2011 via a post on the band's Facebook page. Hood stated that "Her charm and spark will be irreplaceable and her part in our last decade of this band's history is indisputable."

Tucker released a series of instructional cooking videos on YouTube, entitled "Sweet Soul Cookin' with Shonna Tucker".

Tucker's next musical project started taking shape when she, John Neff, and Bo Bedingfield worked up a version of Deana Carter's "Strawberry Wine", thus forming the band Shonna Tucker and Eye Candy. The band released their first album A Tell All in October 2013, a record that features songs "about love and jealousy, nights spent on the road and nights spent in the kitchen, the things men do to women and women do for men." Tucker contributed a cover of "Roll On (Eighteen Wheeler)" to the Alabama tribute record High Cotton.

== Eye Candy ==
Tucker's current band, Eye Candy, is made up of primarily Athens-based musicians. The lineup is currently:

- John Neff (ex-guitarist for the Drive-By Truckers).
- Bo Bedingfield (guitar).
- Clay Leverett (drums, formerly of Bright Eyes).
- Neil Golden (keyboards, formerly of The Glands, Japancakes and Elf Power).

== Discography ==
=== Studio albums ===
- A Tell All (2013)
- Dreams of Mine - EP (2019)
