= Alabama Ass Whuppin' =

Live album by Drive-By Truckers
- Released: 2000
- Recorded: Fall 1999
- Genre: Country rock
- Label: Second Heaven Records

Drive-By Truckers chronology
Pizza Deliverance (1999)	Alabama Ass Whuppin' (2000)	Southern Rock Opera (2001)

Professional ratings
Review scores
Source	Rating
Allmusic	3.5/5 stars

Alabama Ass Whuppin' is the title of the first Drive-By Truckers live album. It was recorded live in Athens and Atlanta in 1999. During the band's 2012 New Year's Eve rock show at the 9:30 Club in DC, it was announced that an expanded vinyl and CD release of the album was scheduled for 2013. A new version of the album was remastered and released on ATO Records in 2013.

== Track listing ==
1. "Why Henry Drinks"
2. "Lookout Mountain"
3. "The Living Bubba"
4. "Too Much Sex (Too Little Jesus)"
5. "Don't Be in Love Around Me"
6. "18 Wheels of Love"
7. "The Avon Lady"
8. "Margo and Harold"
9. "Buttholeville"
10. "Steve McQueen"
11. "People Who Died" (Cover of The Jim Carroll Band)
12. "Love Like This"

== Personnel ==
- Mike Cooley - guitars, lead and backing vocals
- Patterson Hood - guitars, lead and backing vocals
- Rob Malone - bass, backing vocals
- Brad Morgan - drums
