= Wes Freed =

American outsider artist (1964–2022)

- Born: April 25, 1964
- Died: September 4, 2022 (aged 58)
- Partner: Jackie Folkes (2012-Death)

Wes Freed (April 25, 1964 – September 4, 2022) was an Americana Culture artist. His works appeared on album covers of Lauren Hoffman and numerous American rock bands, including Cracker and the Drive-By Truckers.

== Early life ==
Freed was born in the Shenandoah Valley, Virginia, on April 25, 1964. During his high school years, he served as secretary of his school's Future Farmers of America chapter. Injured severely in a cattle chute while in high school, Wes whiled away the hours in recovery drawing and developing his future style of poetic country noir and southern gothic that evoked the dark and lonesome characters of boot leggers, mechanics and haunts grappling with a transitioning rural south during the 1970s. He considered moving to New York to become an artist. However, he relocated to Richmond, Virginia, in 1983 to study painting and printmaking at Virginia Commonwealth University. He ultimately remained in Richmond until his death.

== Career ==
In addition to his art, Freed played in Dirt Ball, an alternative country band based in Richmond. He served as its lead singer starting in 1986. He also played with other local groups, such as the Shiners (a spin-off from Dirt Ball), Mudd Helmet, the Mutant Drones, and the MagBats. It was during his time with Dirt Ball and Mudd Helmet that Freed designed show posters, adopting an "outsider" style that would influence his later works.

Freed became acquainted with the Drive-By Truckers (DBT) in 1997, when they were invited to play in the first Capital City Barndance, a show designed to reflect the long lived Old Dominion Barn Dance with the addition of folk and rock artists as well as traditional country. That fateful event led to a long and beloved relationship between Wes and the Drive By Truckers. As DBT grew in fame and sales so did Wes' art which adorned backdrops, drum kits and roadie boxes up until his first album cover for the band Southern Rock Opera. He ultimately designed ten album covers for the Truckers. He later identified the cover art of The Dirty South (2004) as his personal favorite. Freed utilized marker, watercolor, and acrylic paint, typically on wood. He continued to design posters, T-shirts, backgrounds, and miscellaneous merchandise for DBT, as well as the artwork in the 2009 documentary about the Truckers, titled The Secret To A Happy Ending. The final cover he designed for the band was for Welcome 2 Club XIII (2022).

Apart from his work with DBT, Freed also collaborated with Lauren Hoffman and Cracker. He continued to paint commissioned and gifted work for various recipients globally. While visiting Wes he consistently had active projects. He maintained a high volume of artistic output. He released in 2019 The Art of Wes Freed – Paints, Posters, Pin-ups and Possums, a coffee table book that compiled his most notable works. Multitudes of friends and family carry his art everywhere they go right on their skin.

== Personal life ==
Freed is survived by his longtime partner, Jackie Folkes.

Freed died on September 4, 2022, at the age of 58, nine months after he was diagnosed with colorectal cancer.
