= Southern Rock Opera =

Studio album by Drive-By Truckers
- Released: 25 September 2001
- Recorded: September 2000
- Genres: Southern rock; alternative country
- Length: 94:04
- Label: Soul Dump
- Producers: Drive-By Truckers; Dick Cooper; David Barbe

Drive-By Truckers chronology
Alabama Ass Whuppin' (2000)	Southern Rock Opera (2001)	Decoration Day (2003)

Southern Rock Opera is the third studio album by the American rock band Drive-By Truckers, released on 25 September 2001. A double album covering an ambitious range of subject matter from the politics of race to 1970s stadium rock, Southern Rock Opera either imagines, or filters, every topic through the context of legendary Southern band Lynyrd Skynyrd. The record was originally self-released on Soul Dump Records. The album was re-released on July 16, 2002, by Lost Highway Records. The album was financed by issuing promissory notes in exchange for loans from fans, family and friends of the band.

The album's artwork was done by Richmond, Virginia artist Wes Freed.

== Origin and making of the album ==
The idea for Southern Rock Opera pre-dates the band's formation in 1996. Southern Rock Opera began in a long discussion between Drive-By Truckers' frontman Patterson Hood and former Truckers bassist and producer Earl Hicks, during a road trip. The pair discussed writing a semi-autobiographical screenplay about growing up in the South and about the plane crash that almost ended the career of the rock band Lynyrd Skynyrd, taking singer Ronnie Van Zant, guitarist Steve Gaines, and Gaines' back-up-singer sister Cassie Gaines.

Soon after this discussion, Hood formed Drive-By Truckers. The Truckers recorded two studio albums and one live album during the four years between their formation and the actual recording of Southern Rock Opera. During these years, Drive-By's principal songwriters Hood, Mike Cooley, and Rob Malone continued to contribute songs to "The Rock Opera", as they had come to call it.

After the release of their live album Alabama Ass Whuppin', Drive-By Truckers began recording what they hoped would be their magnum opus: Southern Rock Opera. According to Patterson Hood, "(the album) was recorded in Birmingham, upstairs in a uniform shop during an early September heat wave, with no air-conditioning. We had to turn the fans off when we were recording, and we worked from 6 p.m. to 6 a.m. So Southern Rock Opera was fun to write, but we had a miserable time making it."

After the album was finished, however, the troubles continued for The Truckers when they ran out of funding for the immense project. To resolve the problem, and to avoid "any fine print crap", as Hood put it, the band took a non-traditional approach. The Truckers made a prospectus and solicited investors, with a promise of 15% interest, to pay for the manufacturing and distribution of Southern Rock Opera. The approach worked. Through their fan-based online news group and by sheer word of mouth, The Truckers were able to raise $23,000. This allowed them to print about 5,000 copies of the album, and buy a "new" used van for touring.

Southern Rock Opera was finally released on September 12, 2001, on Soul Dump Records.

== Critical reception ==
Professional ratings
Aggregate scores
Source	Rating
Metacritic	86/100
Review scores
Source	Rating
AllMusic	5/5 stars
The Austin Chronicle	4/5 stars
Now	4/5
Q	3/5 stars
Rolling Stone	4/5 stars
The Rolling Stone Album Guide	4/5 stars
The Village Voice	A−

The album was voted the 22nd best of the year in the Pazz & Jop music critic poll of 2002.

The poll founder, Robert Christgau, named it his 23rd favorite album of 2001.

Rhapsody (online music service) ranked the album #6 on its "Rock's Best Albums of the Decade" list.

The album was also included in the book 1001 Albums You Must Hear Before You Die.

== Re-release ==
The critical praise for Southern Rock Opera created no shortage of buzz around the album and the band. The Truckers did not have the means to press the necessary number of copies of the album on their own.

In order to meet demand, Drive-By Truckers signed a large-scale distribution deal with Lost Highway Records. Southern Rock Opera was re-released, this time worldwide, on July 16, 2002.

== Track listing ==
=== Disc one: Act one: Betamax Guillotine ===
Vinyl releases have tracks 1–5 on side A, and 6–11 on side B. Some early vinyl printings lack Moved.

No.	Title	Writer(s)	Length
1.	"Days of Graduation"	Hood	2:36
2.	"Ronnie and Neil"	Hood	4:52
3.	"72 (This Highway's Mean)"	Cooley	5:26
4.	"Dead, Drunk, and Naked"	Hood	4:51
5.	"Guitar Man Upstairs"	Cooley	3:17
6.	"Birmingham"	Hood	5:03
7.	"The Southern Thing"	Hood	5:08
8.	"The Three Great Alabama Icons"	Hood	6:51
9.	"Wallace"	Hood	3:27
10.	"Zip City"	Cooley	5:16
11.	"Moved"	Malone	4:17
Total length:			51:04

=== Disc two: Act two ===
Vinyl releases have tracks 1–5 on side C, and 6–9 on Side D.

No.	Title	Writer(s)	Length
1.	"Let There Be Rock"	Hood	4:19
2.	"Road Cases"	Hood	2:42
3.	"Women Without Whiskey"	Cooley	4:19
4.	"Plastic Flowers on the Highway"	Hood	5:04
5.	"Cassie's Brother"	Malone	4:58
6.	"Life in the Factory"	Hood	5:28
7.	"Shut Up and Get on the Plane"	Cooley	3:38
8.	"Greenville to Baton Rouge"	Hood	4:11
9.	"Angels and Fuselage"	Hood	8:00
Total length:			42:39

== Personnel ==
=== Band ===
- Mike Cooley – lyrics, guitar, ambience, vocals
- Earl Hicks – bass
- Patterson Hood – lyrics, guitar, ambience, vocals, storytelling
- Rob Malone – lyrics, guitar, ambience, vocals
- Brad Morgan – drums

=== Guest performers ===
- Kelly Hogan – backing vocals on "Cassie's Brother" and "Angels And Fuselage" (as Cassie Gaines)
- Anne Richmond Boston – 1st group vocal
- Jyl Freed – 2nd group vocal
- Amy Pike – 3rd group vocal

=== Crew ===
- David Barbe, Dick Cooper, Drive-By Truckers – production
- Rodney Mills – mastering
- Dick Cooper, Earl Hicks – engineering
- Wes Freed, Patrick Hood – artwork, photography, cover art
- Patterson, Lilla Hood – art direction, design, adaptation, liner notes

== See also ==
- Wes Freed
