= Gangstabilly =

Album by Drive-By Truckers

Studio album by Drive-By Truckers
- Released: March 24, 1998
- Genre: Post-cowpunk
- Length: 53:53
- Label: Soul Dump
- Producers: Andy Baker; Andy LeMaster; Drive-By Truckers

Drive-By Truckers chronology
Gangstabilly (1998)	Pizza Deliverance (1999)

Professional ratings
Review scores
Source	Rating
AllMusic	3/5 stars
Pitchfork Media	7.8/10.0

Gangstabilly is the 1998 debut album of American rock band Drive-By Truckers. The album was recorded "live in the studio" over the course of two days and was produced by Andy Baker and Andy LeMaster. The album's cover art was created by Jim Stacy. The album was re-released on January 25, 2005 by New West Records along with the band's second studio effort, Pizza Deliverance.

On the band's website, bandmember Patterson Hood says that "[Gangstabilly is] the most country of any of our albums." He goes on to admit that the record is "not our best album, but lots of fun and more than a little hint of the better things to come." Hood has consistently stated that the song "The Living Bubba" is the best song he has ever written.

Hood wrote "Demonic Possession" while watching Pat Buchanan's televised speech at the 1996 Republican National Convention. "The Living Bubba" is a tribute to musician Gregory Dean Smalley.

== Track listing ==
1. "Wife Beater" - 3:32 (Patterson Hood)
2. "Demonic Possession" - 4:51 (Hood)
3. "The Tough Sell" - 3:41 (Hood)
4. "The Living Bubba" - 5:56 (Hood)
5. "Late for Church" - 5:26 (Hood, Howell)
6. "Panties in Your Purse" - 4:41 (Mike Cooley)
7. "Why Henry Drinks" - 4:13 (Hood)
8. "18 Wheels of Love" - 4:10 (Hood)
9. "Steve McQueen" - 5:12 (Hood)
10. "Buttholeville" - 5:25 (Hood)
11. "Sandwiches for the Road" - 6:40 (Hood)

== Personnel ==
- Mike Cooley - guitars, vocals, banjo (5)
- Patterson Hood - guitars, vocals, banjo
- John Neff - pedal steel guitar, vocals
- Adam Howell - upright bass, vocals
- Matt Lane - drums
- Barry Sell - mandolin (5), backing vocals (5)
- Redneck Greece - backing vocals (8)
- Jim Stacy - harmonica (9, 10)
