= Mike Cooley (musician) =

American singer-songwriter

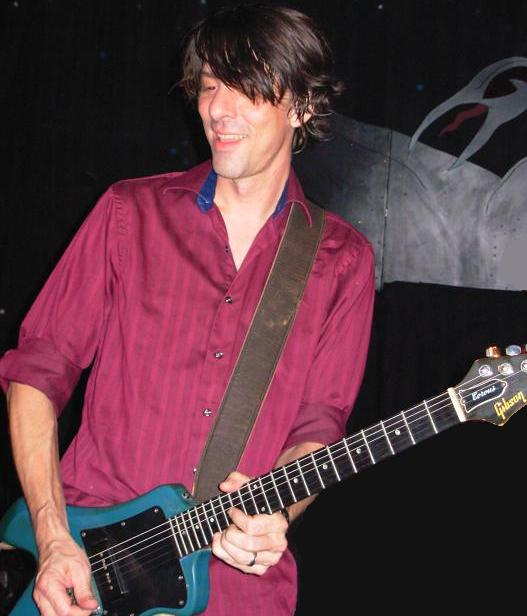

Background information
- Origin: Tuscumbia, Alabama
- Genres: Southern rock; country rock; rock and roll
- Occupations: Singer-songwriter, guitarist
- Instruments: Vocals, guitar
- Years active: 1985–present
- Label: ATO Records
- Member of: Drive-By Truckers

John Michael Cooley (born September 14, 1966) is an American songwriter, singer, and guitarist from Tuscumbia, Alabama, near Muscle Shoals. He is a member of the band Drive-By Truckers.

== Background ==
Cooley received his first guitar at age 8, spending time with a local bluegrass musician to pick up the instrument. In 1985, he formed the punk-influenced band Adam's House Cat with Patterson Hood. The band was chosen as a top ten Best Unsigned Band by a Musician contest in the late 1980s. After the end of Adam's House Cat, Cooley and Hood performed as a duo under the name "Virgil Kane." While living in Auburn, Alabama they started a new band, "Horsepussy," before splitting for a few years. It was during this split that Hood moved to Athens, Georgia and began forming what would become Drive-By Truckers with the intent of luring Cooley back into the fold.

== With the Drive-by Truckers ==
Hood and Cooley formed Drive-By Truckers in 1996. Cooley contributed one song to their debut record Gangstabilly and three songs to the follow-up, Pizza Deliverance. Cooley wrote five songs for the breakout double album Southern Rock Opera, which received a four star rating from Rolling Stone Magazine. Cooley added four songs to the Truckers' next two records Decoration Day and The Dirty South, including his signature song "Carl Perkins' Cadillac". He wrote two songs for the follow-up A Blessing and a Curse and seven for Brighter Than Creation's Dark. He has written three songs for each of the Truckers' records Go-Go Boots and The Big To Do and six songs for their 2014 release English Oceans.

== Solo career ==
In 2013, Cooley released his first solo effort The Fool on Every Corner, a live album recorded at Atlanta's The EARL.

On June 15, 2014, Cooley, Patterson Hood, and Jason Isbell performed at a benefit concert in Florence, Alabama's Shoals Theater. The live acoustic concert was released as an album, Mike Cooley Patterson Hood and Jason Isbell Live at the Shoals Theater on November 6, 2020.

Cooley and Hood occasionally perform as an acoustic duo under the moniker Dimmer Twins.

On May 22, 2021, he performed at a benefit concert in Brookwood, Alabama in support of striking workers during the 2021 Warrior Met Coal strike.

Cooley lives in Hoover, Alabama with his wife and children.

== Drive-By Truckers contributions ==
Year	Album	Song
2022	Welcome 2 Club XIII	"Maria's Awful Disclosures"
2022	Welcome 2 Club XIII	"Every Single Storied Flameout"
2020	The New OK	"Sarah's Flame"
2020	The Unraveling	"Slow Ride Argument"
2020	The Unraveling	"Grievance Merchants"
2016	American Band	"Ramon Casiano"
2016	American Band	"Surrender Under Protest"
2016	American Band	"Filthy and Fried"
2016	American Band	"Kinky Hypocrite"
2016	American Band	"Once They Banned Imagine"
2014	English Oceans	"Shit Shots Count"
2014	English Oceans	"Primer Coat"
2014	English Oceans	"Made Up English Oceans"
2014	English Oceans	"Hearing Jimmy Loud"
2014	English Oceans	"Natural Light"
2014	English Oceans	"First Air of Autumn"
2011	Go-Go Boots	"Cartoon Gold"
2011	Go-Go Boots	"The Weakest Man"
2011	Go-Go Boots	"Pulaski"
2010	The Big To Do	"Birthday Boy"
2010	The Big To Do	"Get Downtown"
2010	The Big To Do	"Eyes Like Glue"
2008	Brighter Than Creation's Dark	"3 Dimes Down"
2008	Brighter Than Creation's Dark	"Perfect Timing"
2008	Brighter Than Creation's Dark	"Self Destructive Zones"
2008	Brighter Than Creation's Dark	"Bob"
2008	Brighter Than Creation's Dark	"Lisa's Birthday"
2008	Brighter Than Creation's Dark	"Checkout Time in Vegas"
2008	Brighter Than Creation's Dark	"A Ghost to Most"
2006	A Blessing and a Curse	"Gravity's Gone"
2006	A Blessing and a Curse	"Space City"
2004	The Dirty South	"Where the Devil Don't Stay"
2004	The Dirty South	"Carl Perkins' Cadillac"
2004	The Dirty South	"Cottonseed"
2004	The Dirty South	"Daddy's Cup"
2003	Decoration Day	"Marry Me"
2003	Decoration Day	"Sounds Better in the Song"
2003	Decoration Day	"When the Pin Hits the Shell"
2003	Decoration Day	"Loaded Gun in the Closet"
2001	Southern Rock Opera	"72 (This Highway's Mean)"
2001	Southern Rock Opera	"Guitar Man Upstairs"
2001	Southern Rock Opera	"Zip City"
2001	Southern Rock Opera	"Women Without Whiskey"
2001	Southern Rock Opera	"Shut Up and Get on the Plane"
2001	Pizza Deliverance	"Uncle Frank"
2001	Pizza Deliverance	"One of These Days"
2001	Pizza Deliverance	"Love Like This"
1998	Gangstabilly	"Panties in Your Purse"

== Discography ==
Live Albums

- The Fool on Every Corner (2013)
