= David Barbe =

American musician (born 1963)

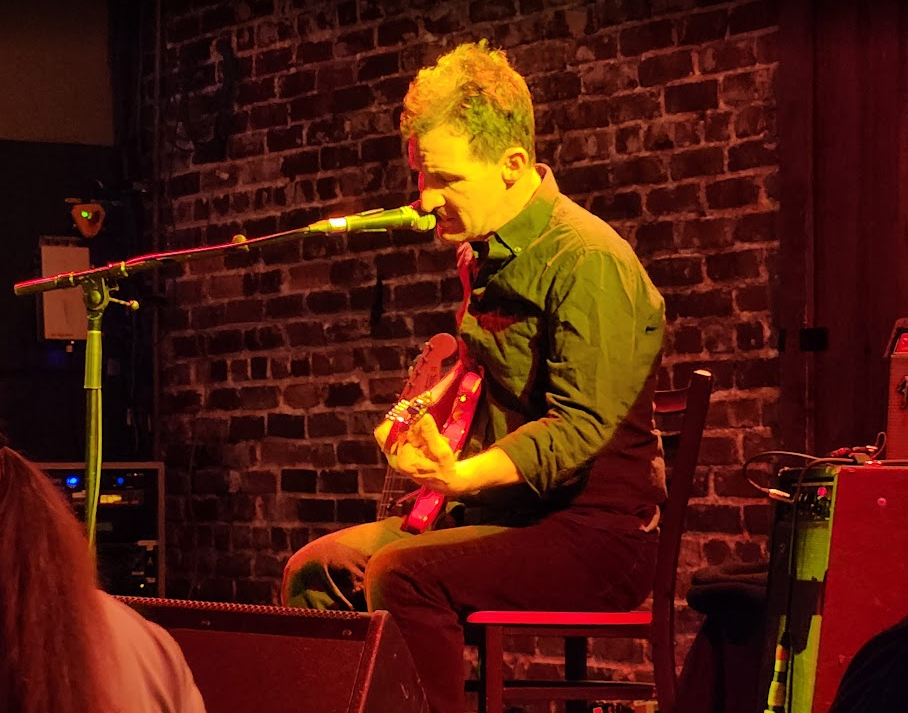
- David Barbe performing in Orlando in 2024

Background information
- Born: September 30, 1963 (age 63); Atlanta, Georgia
- Genres: Rock, Punk
- Instruments: Bass guitar, guitar
- Years active: 1985–present

David Barbe (Note: pronounced /ˈbɑːr.bi/ BAR-bee) (born September 30, 1963) is an American musician and producer/engineer from Athens, Georgia, and director of the Music Business Certificate Program at the University of Georgia. He is chief of Chase Park Transduction studio in Athens. Barbe is known for his work as a songwriter, singer, guitarist, and bass guitarist in Sugar, Mercyland, and Buzz Hungry, as well as solo performances. He has produced nearly every album by the popular country rock band Drive-By Truckers, and has worked as producer and engineer with Son Volt. He has an all-star solo band in Athens called the Quick Hooks.

== Biography ==
David Barbe was musically influenced by his parents — "Time Lady" Jane Barbe and composer John Barbe — who were both big band musicians.

Barbe and his wife, Amy, have three children — daughter Annabelle and sons Winston and Henry. He is a past president of the Athens-Clarke County Little League baseball league and has managed his sons' all-star teams to several city championships.

== Music career ==
Barbe moved to Athens, Georgia, in 1981 to attend the University of Georgia. In Athens, he played occasional guitar with punk favorites Bar-B-Que Killers. In 1985 he formed his own group, Mercyland, with guitarist Andrew Donaldson and drummer Joel Suttles, and in that group acted as the main songwriter, bassist, and co-lead singer. After Mercyland disbanded in 1991, he fronted Buzz Hungry.

He was tutored by John Keane in music production and engineering. Barbe also played with Bob Mould in the Sugar band. He contributed a number of songs, some from Buzz Hungry and some original, that were performed live and/or released as B-sides, such as "Where Diamonds are Halos", which was also recorded as part of a BBC radio session. He left Sugar in early 1995.

Barbe joined Mould for a full gig on October 18, 2009, at the Treasure Island Music Festival.

In 1997, Barbe and two co-owners opened Chase Park Transduction studios in Athens. Since opening Chase Park, Barbe has worked as a producer, engineer, writer and musician on hundreds of recording projects with many artists, including Drive-By Truckers, Deerhunter, the Glands, Jerry Joseph, Amy Ray, k.d. lang, and R.E.M. Barbe has performed in a wide variety of "one-off" bands such as Christa McAuliffe and the Challengers and helped create or contribute to many cassette and vinyl compilation records around Athens and Atlanta such as Proud o' Me Gluttony and Some. He performed at AthFest 2007 with Jack Logan.

In 2011, Barbe remixed and reissued Mercyland’s sole full-length album, No Feet on the Cowling. In 2022, he put out the same band's We Never Lost A Single Game, an album that had been completed long ago but never properly released, and then reunited with Donaldson and Suttles for a pair of reunion shows in Atlanta and Athens.

In August 2010, Barbe was named interim director of the University of Georgia’s Music Business Certificate Program, then in March 2011 he was appointed the certificate program’s director on a permanent basis by Terry College of Business Dean Robert Sumichrast.

David's parents, Jane and John Barbe, were inducted into the Georgia Music Hall of Fame on September 26, 2015.
