= Say Yes =

Say Yes may refer to:

== Music ==
- "Say Yes" (Chage and Aska song), 1991
- "Say Yes", 1997 single by Burnin' Daylight
- "Say Yes", 2007 single by Dusty Drake
- "Say Yes" (Floetry song), 2003
- "Say Yes" (Elliott Smith song), 1997
- "Say Yes" (Michelle Williams song), 2014
- "Say Yes" (Tony Moran song), 2016
- "Say Yes (Church Ballad)", a 2018 song by Lukas Graham from 3 (The Purple Album)
- "Say Yes" (Weezer song), 2026

== Other uses ==
- Say Yes (film), a 2001 South Korean horror film
- "Say Yes" (The Walking Dead), a 2017 television episode of The Walking Dead
- Say Yes demonstrations, a series of Australian political demonstrations
- "Say Yes" (short story), a short story written by Tobias Wolff in 1985
