= Moda Center =

Sports arena in Portland, Oregon

- Rose Garden

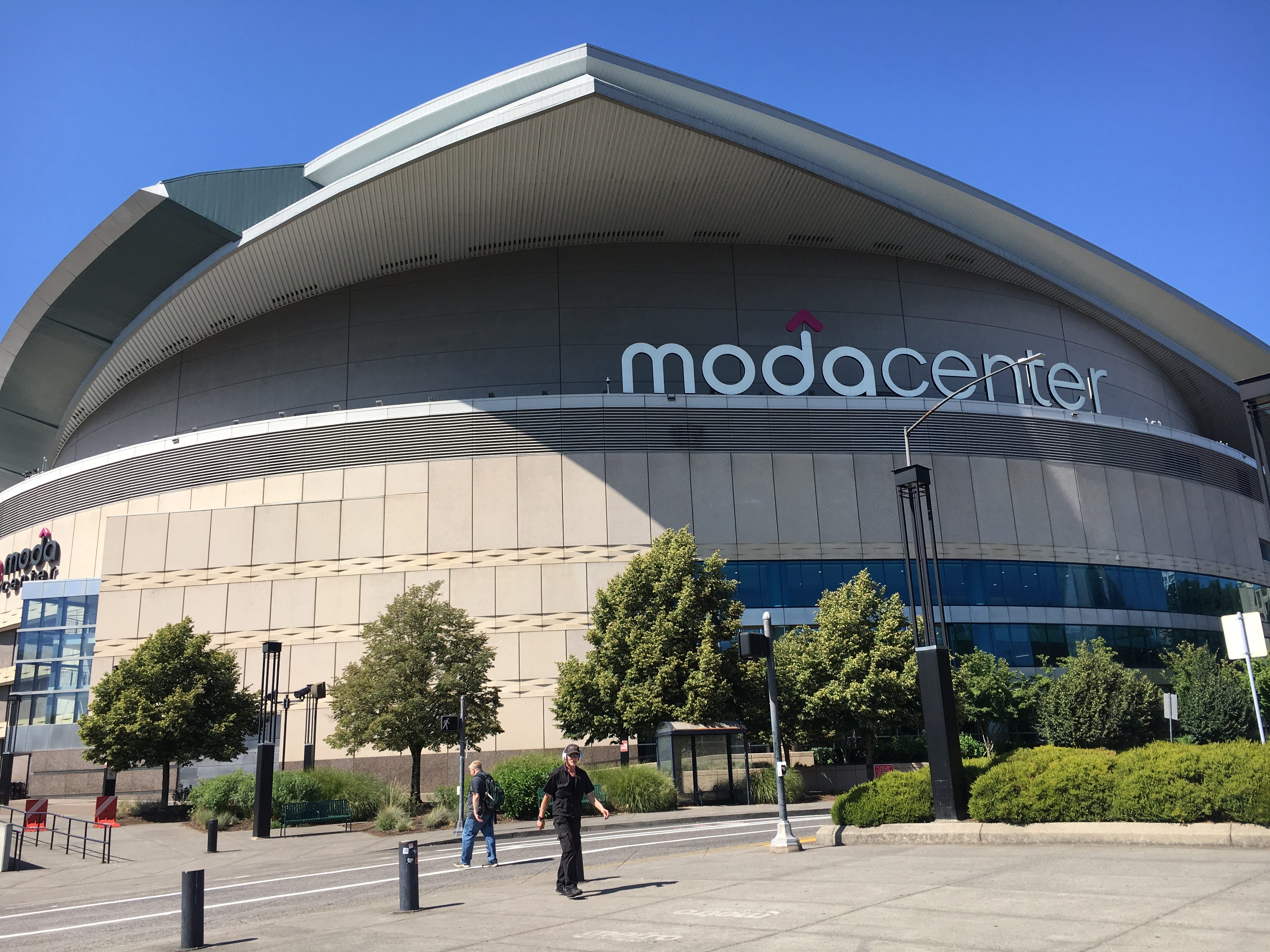
- Moda Center in 2019

- Location in Portland Location in Oregon Location in the United States
- Full name: Moda Center at the Rose Quarter
- Former names: Rose Garden (1995–2013)
- Address: 1 North Center Court Street
- Location: Portland, Oregon, U.S.
- Coordinates: 45°31′54″N 122°40′0″W
- Owner: City of Portland
- Operator: Rip City Management
- Capacity: Basketball: 19,393 (2015–present); 19,441 (2014–2015); 19,980 (1999–2014); 21,538 (1996–1999); 21,401 (1995–1996); Ice hockey / Box lacrosse: 18,280; Center stage: approx. 20,500; End stage: approx. 15,000 "Theatre of the Clouds": approx. 6,500
- Public transit: MAX Light Rail at Rose Quarter Transit Center at Interstate/Rose Quarter; Bus Service; 4, 8, 35, 44, 77

Construction
- Groundbreaking: July 12, 1993
- Opened: October 12, 1995
- Cost: $262 million ($554 million in 2025 dollars)
- Architect: Ellerbe Becket
- Project managers: Shiels Obletz Johnsen, Inc.
- Structural engineer: KPFF Consulting Engineers
- Services engineer: Flack + Kurtz, Inc.
- General contractor: Drake/Turner

Tenants
- Portland Trail Blazers (NBA) (1995–present); Portland Winterhawks (WHL) (1995–2021); Portland Forest Dragons (AFL) (1997–1999); Portland Pythons (WISL) (1998–1999); Portland Fire (WNBA) (2000–2002); Portland LumberJax (NLL) (2006–2009); Portland Thunder/Steel (AFL) (2014–2016); Portland Fire (WNBA) (2026–present)

Website
- rosequarter.com

Moda Center, formerly known as the Rose Garden, is the primary indoor sports arena in Portland, Oregon, United States. It is used for basketball, rodeos, circuses, conventions, ice shows, concerts, and dramatic productions. The arena has a capacity of 20,500 spectators. As of 2007, it is equipped with state-of-the-art acoustics and other amenities.

The arena is owned by the City of Portland. The primary tenants are the Portland Trail Blazers of the NBA, and the WNBA's Portland Fire.

The other major tenant of the building was the major junior hockey franchise Portland Winterhawks of the Western Hockey League, which used to split its schedule with the Memorial Coliseum next door. In addition to the Blazers and Winterhawks, several other professional sports franchises, and the Portland State University men's basketball team, either currently play home games in Moda Center, or have done so in the past. In addition, Moda Center is a popular venue for concerts and other artistic productions.

Construction began in 1993, and the arena opened on October 12, 1995. The arena cost US$262 million to build; construction was financed with funds obtained by a variety of sources, including the City of Portland, Paul Allen's personal fortune, and $155 million in bonds issued by a consortium of mutual funds and insurance companies. These bonds would become the subject of an acrimonious 2004 bankruptcy in which the Oregon Arena Corporation, the holding company which owned the arena at the time, would forfeit title to the arena in lieu of repaying the bonds per the payment terms. Allen would later repurchase the arena from the creditors in 2007.

== Description ==
Moda Center is a multipurpose arena which is suitable for numerous indoor sports, including basketball, ice hockey, arena football, and lacrosse, as well as for hosting other events such as concerts, conventions, and circuses. The arena is located in a sports and entertainment district known as the Rose Quarter, a parcel of land in inner northeast Portland which also includes the Memorial Coliseum arena, as well as several parking structures, restaurants, and other amenities.

=== Name ===
The original name of the facility was "Rose Garden"; however, the arena was also commonly known as the "Rose Garden Arena" to distinguish it from the International Rose Test Garden, also located in Portland. The name was chosen both to reflect Portland's reputation as the Rose City, and to reflect the importance to basketball heritage of Boston Garden and Madison Square Garden arenas in Boston and New York City, respectively. When the name was selected, the remainder of the former coliseum grounds were given the name "Rose Quarter".

In 2007, the Trail Blazers and Vulcan announced that they were seeking a corporate partner to grant naming rights for the facility, with the goal of a new name being available for the Blazers' 2008–09 season. In August 2013, the Trail Blazers announced a 10-year deal with Moda Health, an Oregon-based health insurance provider, to rename the arena Moda Center.

The renaming spurred a public outcry and petition by fans and Portlanders who preferred the old name. Portland mayor Charlie Hales initially expressed concern about the name, calling it a "head scratcher".

=== Structure and architecture ===
Moda Center is a precast concrete-framed structure with a roof made up of skeletal steel. The arena structure encloses a total of over 785,000 square feet (72,900 m^{2}), on eight levels, five of which are open to the public. The building height is 140 feet (43 m), from the event floor to the pinnacle of the saddle-shaped roof. The arena includes a 60-by-40-foot (18 m × 12 m) permanent stage, and a 200-by-85-foot (61 m × 26 m) ice rink.

The building is composed of over 48,000 cubic yards (37,000 m^{3}) of concrete, and over 9,700 short tons (8,800 t) of steel. The exterior is composed of over 29,000 square feet (2,700 m^{2}) of glass, 17,500 square feet (1,630 m^{2}) of plaster, 52,000 square feet (4,800 m^{2}) of architectural precast, 39,000 square feet (3,600 m^{2}) of insulation, and 13,654 square feet (1,268.5 m^{2}) of steel louvers.

The building, designed by architecture firm Ellerbe Becket, has been criticized by some in Portland's architectural community. A survey of local architects and planners was conducted by the Portland Tribune, and subsequently Moda Center was listed among the five ugliest buildings in the city.

=== Seating ===
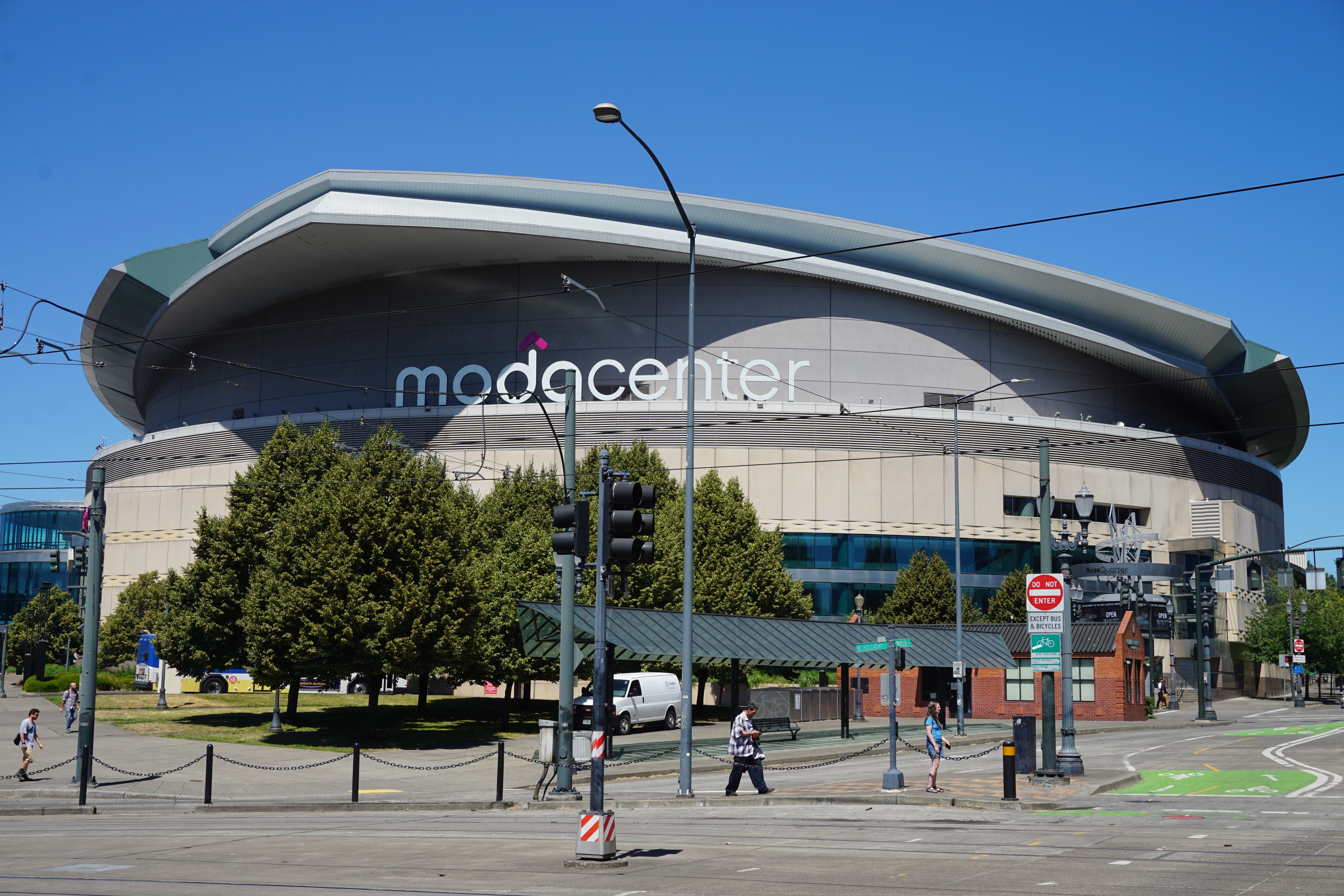
Moda Center at the Rose Quarter

The arena has a total of over 14,000 permanent seats arranged in two bowls. An additional 1540 permanent seats are found in the arena's 70 skyboxes. Over 4,200 portable seats may or may not be installed, depending on the arena's configuration. When configured for basketball, the arena has a capacity of 19,393, and can accommodate a total of up to 20,796 patrons with standing room. Prior to the 1998 NBA season the capacity was reduced to 19,980 from the original 21,485 spectators. When configured for hockey or lacrosse, capacity decreases to 17,544. The arena supports numerous other configurations for events such as concerts, monster trucks, and circuses. The seating below the suites, known as the lower bowl, is further divided into the 100 and 200 levels. The upper bowl seats, above the suites, are the 300 level.

==== Skyboxes and suites ====
The arena features 70 Suites and 8 Skyboxes each with a seating capacity of 22 guests. Suites include amenities such as a wet bar, catering, a private restroom, multiple television monitors, and a sound system. Suites may be rented on a yearly or single-event basis; yearly renters of suites are given access to all Moda Center events. The arena also features modular party suites, which can be configured either as a pair of 44-person Super Suites, or as one 88-person mega suite.

==== Theater of the Clouds ====
For smaller, more intimate events, Moda Center can be placed into a configuration known as the "Theater of the Clouds". This configuration, part of a trend of large arenas having smaller theater configurations, places the stage at center court, and utilizes the western side of the arena. Custom floor-to-ceiling theater curtains are draped at the edges of the seating area, creating a more intimate setting. As of 2004, on average 10 events per year have been held in the Theater of the Clouds configuration. The Theater of the Clouds configuration seats 6,500, with 16 of the 70 luxury boxes being usable.

=== Amenities ===
Two concourses, the 100 level and the 300 level, are open to the ticket-buying public during events; the 100 level concourse provides access to the lower bowl (including the 200-level seats); the 300-level concourse provides access to the upper bowl. A third concourse, the 200 level, provides access to guest services such as a sports bar, a barbecue grill, an executive banquet facility, and several outdoor terraces. A fourth concourse, known as Suite Level, provides access to the skyboxes and is restricted to patrons who have skybox admission. All concourses provide a variety of concession stands. The arena also features 32 public restrooms; women's toilets outnumber men's toilets 3 to 1. There are Wi-Fi hotspots throughout the arena. The concourses are decorated with historical memorabilia.

The primary scoreboard is a Mitsubishi-manufactured HD video scoreboard. This scoreboard, which hangs from the ceiling over center court, features four 15 feet by 22.5 feet (4.5 m by 6.75 m) video screens, among the biggest in the NBA. The arena also features over 650 television monitors placed throughout, showing the action on court. Auxiliary scoreboards located both in the arena itself and the concourses provide statistical information, including "hustle" statistics for basketball (rebounds, blocked shots, and steals). Three media towers, one at each main entrance, provide video of other games in the NBA.

=== Acoustics ===
A unique feature found in no other multi-purpose arena is known as the "acoustical cloud". The acoustical cloud is a set of 160 rotating acoustic panels suspended from the Moda Center ceiling, intended to recreate the roar of noise that made the old Memorial Coliseum one of the loudest buildings in the NBA. One side of each 10 feet by 10 feet (3 m by 3 m) panel reflects sound, while the other side absorbs sound. Each panel is shaped like an airplane wing, and is 8 inches (20 cm) thick at the center and 4 inches (10 cm) thick at the edges. The effect during Blazers games is to absorb the noise from the upper levels and reflect it back down to the court.

The panels permit the acoustics of the arena to be adjusted according to the requirements of the event. For smaller events in which only the lower bowl of the arena is used, the panels can be lowered to further improve the sound and increase the intimacy of the arena. The acoustical cloud cost US$2 million to design and install. The arena is also equipped with a JBL sound system. The acoustics of Moda Center have been widely praised compared to similar venues.

== Ownership and management ==
The Moda Center is owned by the City of Portland, which acquired the arena for $7.13 million from the estate of Paul Allen in 2024. Management and operation of Moda Center, along with other Rose Quarter facilities, is performed by Rip City Management, a sister company of the Portland Trail Blazers, also wholly owned by the estate of Paul Allen.

== Tenants ==
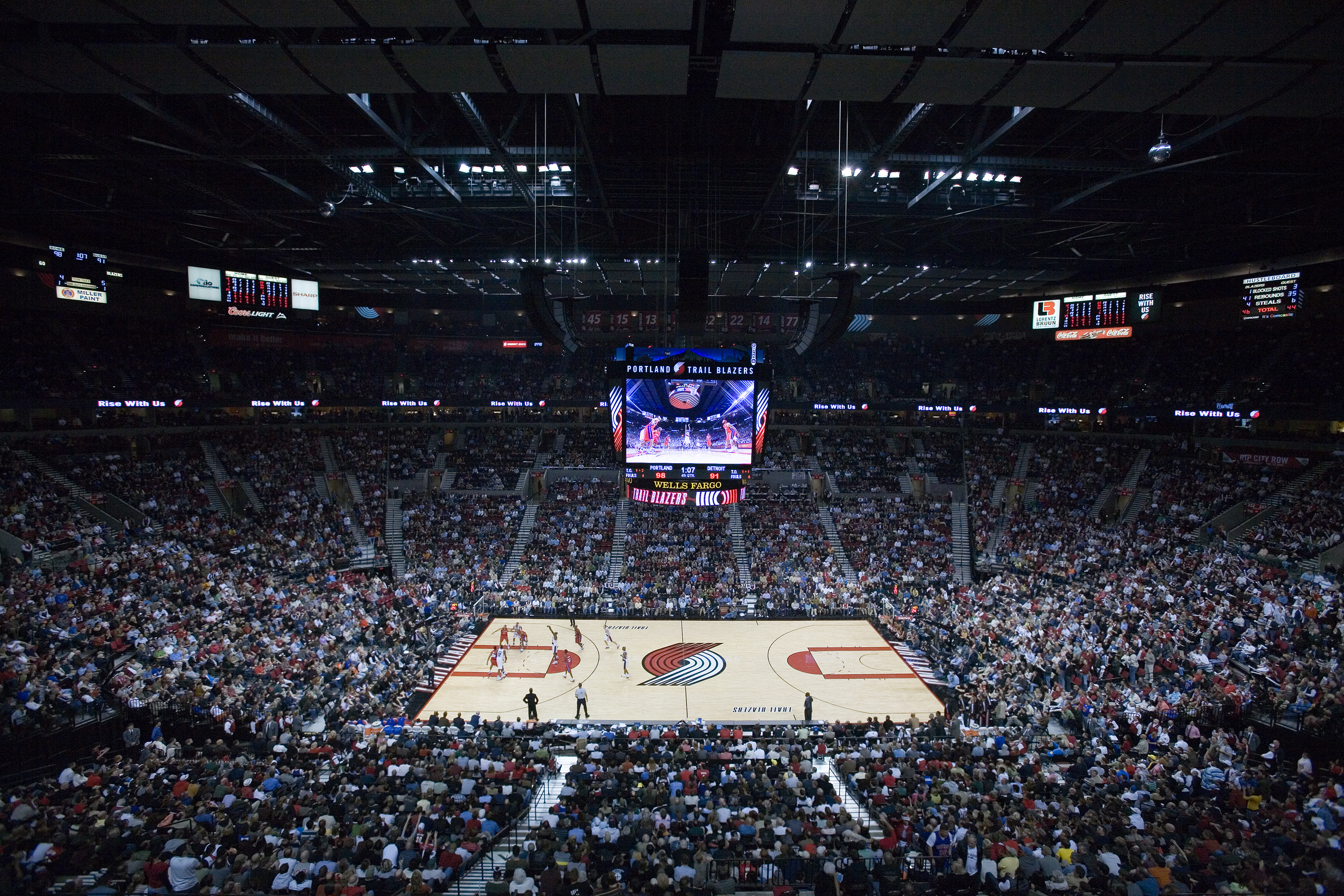
Interior during a Trail Blazers game

The arena's current primary tenant is the Portland Trail Blazers of the NBA currently owned by entrepenur Thomas Dundon, who purchased the team from the estate of Microsoft co-founder Paul Allen in March 2026. The head of the estate is his sister Jody Allen. The Trail Blazers have a lease agreement with Moda Health which ran through 2025, and an exclusive site agreement with the City of Portland requires the team to remain in Portland through October 2030.

In 2025, before the end of the lease and before purchasing the Blazers, representatives of Dundon convinced state and local officials to finance renovations to the Moda Center. In 2026, negotiations over details of the renovations and who would pay and how much began to falter. In August of 2026, the terms of negotiations were approved by the Portland City Council. Officials from both sides agreed to meet later in the month to begin negotiating a new, 20-year lease.

It was home to the Portland Winterhawks of the Western Hockey League, a Canadian-based junior hockey league. Both the Trail Blazers and Winterhawks previously played in the Memorial Coliseum and moved to the arena when it was completed in 1995. However, the Winterhawks played home games in both facilities during the season. Moda Center and Winterhawks held the Western Hockey League's at the time record for single game attendance with a crowd of 14,103 on March 15, 1997, in which Portland tied the visiting Seattle Thunderbirds, 6–6. Prior to the start of the 2021-22 WHL season, the Winterhawks announced they will be moving back to Veterans Memorial Coliseum full-time.

The arena is also built to accommodate an NHL franchise and there has been speculation over the years about Portland landing an NHL team; however this has not occurred. A former third tenant was the Portland Lumberjax of the National Lacrosse League, who played four seasons in the arena prior to disbanding.

The arena has hosted numerous other minor league sports teams as well. In 1997, an AFL team landed in Portland from Memphis as the Portland Forest Dragons. Two seasons later, they relocated to Oklahoma City. The arena started hosting another AFL team, the Portland Steel (originally called the Portland Thunder), from 2014 until it disbanded in 2016. From 2000 through 2002, the facility hosted the original Portland Fire of the WNBA. In the past, the Portland State Vikings men's basketball team has played home games in the arena; currently, the team plays its home games at Viking Pavilion on the PSU campus.

On September 18, 2024, the WNBA announced that a revived Portland Fire would play at the arena and in Portland for the first time since 2002.

== History ==
In the early 1980s, as the National Basketball Association increased in popularity, it became apparent that the 12,888-seat Memorial Coliseum, which was the home of the Portland Trail Blazers at the time, was no longer an adequate NBA facility. The Trail Blazers had sold out every home game since April 5, 1977. In 1988, the team was purchased by Paul Allen and made appearances in the NBA Finals in 1990 and 1992. Allen soon expressed a desire to build a new arena for his team, and in 1991 chartered the Oregon Arena Corporation, a private corporation with Allen as the sole shareholder, to build and operate a new facility. The team soon made an agreement with the City of Portland to build a new multi-purpose arena on the Coliseum's parking lot.

A major factor in the choice of the site for the new arena was its close proximity to transit, with MAX Light Rail and bus service at TriMet's Coliseum Transit Center (later renamed Rose Quarter Transit Center) being adjacent to the site. In July 1995, the Portland Business Journal quoted the Trail Blazers' then-president Marshall Glickman as saying, "There is no doubt that transit made it possible for us to build here. The thing that burns everyone in terms of financing big projects like this is parking. The fact that we have a [light rail] stop outside our front door, and the potential for what we'll get with the south/north line made this the only place for us to build." (The "south/north" MAX line referred to was a then-planned line from Clackamas Town Center to Vancouver via downtown Portland, which was canceled in 1996, but partially revived several years later, with the MAX Yellow Line connecting Moda Center with areas to the north.)

=== Financing ===
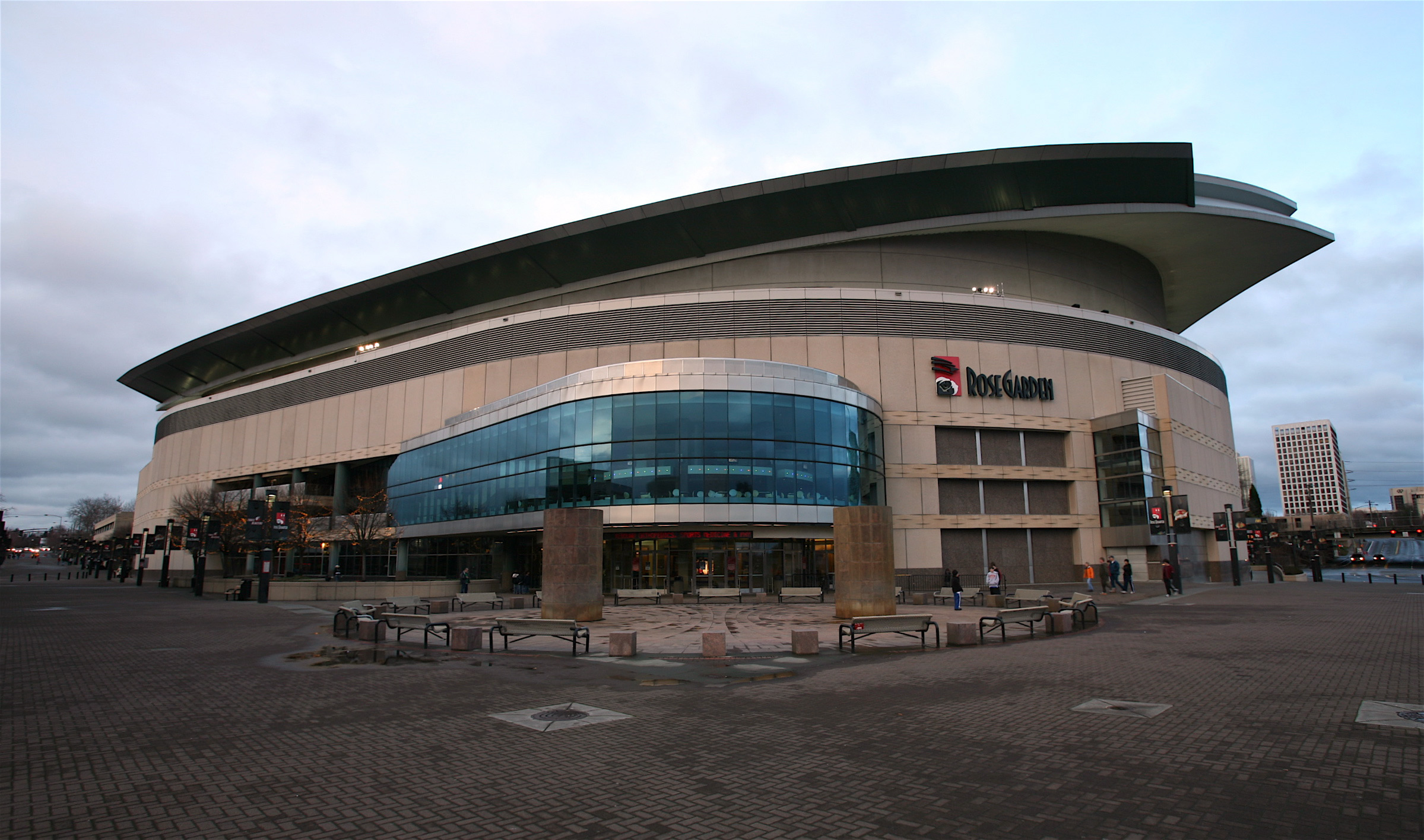
An exterior shot of the arena

The financing of the construction of the facility was widely hailed at the time as a good example of public-private partnership; most of the costs were borne by Allen and/or Allen-owned companies, rather than by taxpayers. The bulk of the $262 million construction costs were funded by a $155 million loan from a consortium of lenders led by pension fund TIAA-CREF. As Allen was unwilling to guarantee the loan with his personal finances, the lenders demanded an interest rate of 8.99%, with no opportunity for prepayment. Other major creditors included Prudential Insurance, and Farmers Insurance.

The remainder of funds came from the City of Portland ($34.5 million), Allen himself ($46 million), with the final $10 million coming from a bond backed by box office and parking revenues. In addition, the City transferred to Allen the underlying land. The city maintains ownership of the Memorial Coliseum and the adjacent parking garages, but the right to manage these was also transferred to Allen. In exchange, Allen signed an exclusive site agreement with the city requiring the Trail Blazers to play all home games in Portland for 30 years The City of Portland hoped that the building of the arena would lead to other renovation or development in the Rose Quarter district, but as of 2021 this has yet to materialize.

=== Construction and opening ===
Ground on the arena was broken in 1993, and the arena opened on October 12, 1995. The project included the largest construction and demolition recycling program in the U.S. up to that time, in which 32,700 tonnes (32,200 long tons; 36,000 short tons) of construction waste and 308,400 tonnes (303,500 long tons; 340,000 short tons) of dirt were recycled, saving OAC over $127,000. This effort later won the project an environmental award from the city.

The first concert held in the arena was held two weeks after opening, when David Bowie performed on October 25, with Nine Inch Nails opening. The first regular-season game to be played at the facility was the Trail Blazers hosting the then-Vancouver Grizzlies on November 3, 1995, a 92–80 defeat for the home team. The arena was originally capable of seating 20,340 spectators for NBA basketball. Its capacity has since been reduced to 19,393 by subsequent modifications. At the time of its construction, the arena was a state-of-the-art facility. Although more recent NBA arenas have surpassed Moda Center in amenities, it still is well regarded as a facility. A 2005 survey by USA Today ranked the facility in the middle of the pack among the 29 NBA arenas; factors unrelated to the venue itself (such as ticket prices and entertainment offerings) are considered in the rankings.

Soon after the arena opened, it was the subject of several lawsuits seeking to enforce the Americans with Disabilities Act. One lawsuit (United States v. Ellerbe Becket, Inc.) was filed by the United States Department of Justice against architect Ellerbe-Becket; another (Independent Living Resources v. Oregon Arena Corporation) was filed by a disabled advocacy group against OAC. Both lawsuits alleged that Moda Center (and other facilities designed by Ellerbe Becket) did not provide adequate seating for patrons using wheelchairs, and that the line-of-sight of patrons in wheelchairs was frequently obstructed by standing spectators. The first case was settled with a consent decree, wherein Ellerbe Becket agreed to design future projects in compliance with the ADA; the lawsuit against Oregon Arena Corp was resolved in 1998 when OAC agreed to install over one hundred elevated seats permitting wheelchair-using patrons to see over standing spectators in front.

=== Oregon Arena Corporation bankruptcy ===
Claiming the local economy was responsible for reduced revenues which made it unable to make payments on the loans used to finance construction, the Oregon Arena Corporation filed for bankruptcy on February 27, 2004. After negotiations concurrent with the bankruptcy failed to produce a settlement, the United States Bankruptcy Court ordered on November 8 of that year that the Oregon Arena Corporation transfer the facility to the creditors. A new corporation owned by the creditors, Portland Arena Management (PAM) took over operation of the arena. PAM in turn hired Global Spectrum to operate the arena. For several years, the Trail Blazers (still owned by Allen) and the Portland Arena Management had a highly hostile relationship, with the two entities competing for ticket sales.

The team made numerous complaints about a "broken economic model", and there was much speculation that the Trail Blazers might leave. The team was put up for sale in the summer of 2006, only to be taken off the market again several months later. Speculation intensified as to what would happen, and the team and Paul Allen were roundly criticized in the media. Despite the criticism and the team's poor finances the team insisted that bankruptcy was the right move.

Early in 2007, Allen and the creditors reached an agreement for Allen to repurchase the arena, and the team and the building were united under common ownership once more. After much speculation that Allen would hire Anschutz Entertainment Group (AEG) to replace Global Spectrum, arena management elected to extend Global Spectrum's management contract by one year in the summer of 2007. In September 2007, Global Spectrum announced that the arena would undergo $13 million in renovations.

== Notable events ==
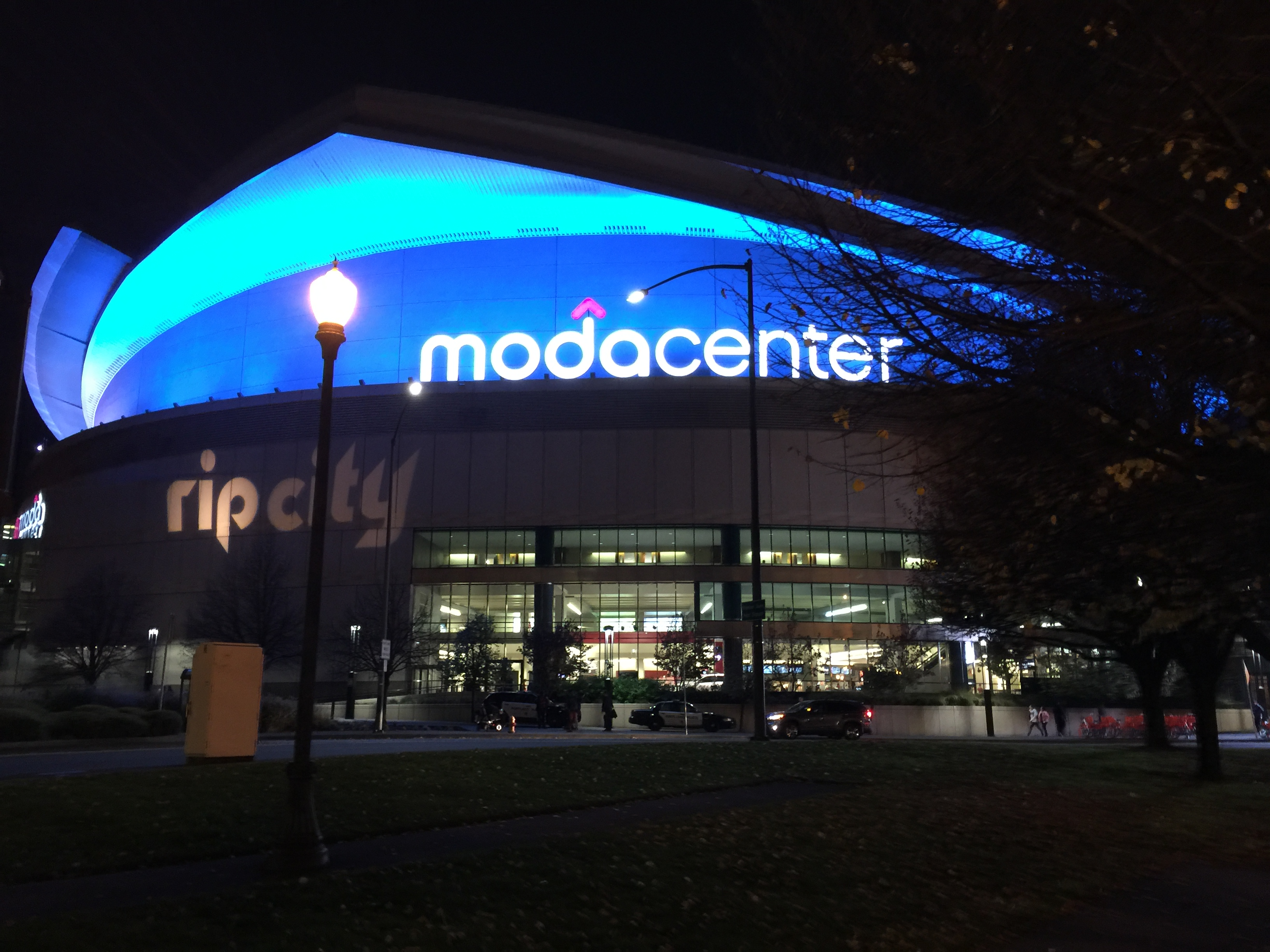
Moda Center at night

While Moda Center has never hosted the NBA Finals (Portland's last appearance in the Finals was in 1992, three years before the arena opened), it has hosted three NBA Western Conference Finals series: in 1999 vs. the San Antonio Spurs; in 2000 vs. the Los Angeles Lakers; and in 2019 vs. the Golden State Warriors. One NBA-related event Moda Center—and for that matter, the Trail Blazers franchise—has never hosted is the NBA All-Star Game. The Trail Blazers are one of several franchises to never host an All-Star game; the Blazers' All-Star drought of 42 years is second only to the Boston Celtics, who last hosted the game in 1964. According to the Oregon Sports Authority, the main issue is hotel space close to the arena; the city of Portland lacks the large "headquarters" hotel needed to host the NBA and media entourage which accompanies the game.

Moda Center has also hosted PBR Built Ford Tough Series bull riding events.

The arena has hosted various WWE events, including Unforgiven in 2004, No Mercy in 2008, and NXT TakeOver: Portland in 2020. The arena has also hosted various episodes of Raw and SmackDown.

The arena has also hosted UFC 102 in 2009.

In 2004, Portland was selected as one of five cities in the U.S. to host the Dew Action Sports Tour, a new extreme sports franchise to start in 2005. Titled the Vans Invitational, the event was held at the Rose Quarter from August 17 to 21. The Rose Quarter hosted BMX: Dirt and Freestyle Motocross. The Dew Action Sports returned to Portland for a third year.

In the winter of 2005, the Rose Quarter hosted the U.S. Figure Skating Championships, an event attended by over 100,000 spectators. The arena would later host the 2007 NLL All Star Game on March 10, 2007.

In 2009, the arena hosted first- and second-round games of the NCAA men's basketball tournament as well as in 2015 and 2022. It was the first time NCAA men's tournament games were played in the state of Oregon since 1983, though the arena did host the finals of the 2008 Big Sky Conference men's basketball tournament. The state had been under an NCAA-imposed tournament embargo due to sports betting being legal in the state (specifically, the Oregon Lottery's "Sports Action" game, a parlay game which allowed bettors to wager on NFL games), but was awarded 2009 tournament games when the state Legislature eliminated Sports Action from the lottery's lineup. In addition to sports, the arena regularly hosts numerous other types of events, including concerts, circuses, ice shows, and conventions. Portland State University holds its spring commencement ceremonies at the arena.

Notable non-sports related events include the 1998 Portland State commencement ceremony, where the keynote speaker was then U.S. President Bill Clinton. The President, speaking before a packed house in the Garden (including a graduating class of 2000), gave a speech embracing immigration to the United States, and was also awarded an honorary Doctor of Humane Letters from the university.

On June 27, 2000, a concert by former Pink Floyd member Roger Waters at the arena became the basis for the concert video In the Flesh: Live.

On July 7, 2001 Janet Jackson opened her All for You Tour at the arena. The first three songs of the premiere concert were broadcast live on VH1 as Janet Jackson: Opening Night Live. Along with live reporting from the venue, the broadcast featured clips of Jackson's "Greatest Television Moments".

On September 8, 2007, Beyoncé performed at the arena as part of her The Beyoncé Experience.

On April 24, 2012, British rock band Coldplay performed a sold-out show at the arena as part of their Mylo Xyloto Tour. On October 2, 2017, the band came back to the arena during their A Head Full of Dreams Tour. The band covered Free Fallin' with Peter Buck of R.E.M. there as a tribute to Tom Petty following his death that day.

Lady Gaga performed at the arena on January 15, 2013, as part of her Born This Way Ball tour trek through North America. This was one of the few shows the singer completed in the United States before she was forced to cancel the remainder of the tour due to a labral tear of the hip.

On Sunday, August 9, 2015, Bernie Sanders held a campaign rally at Moda Center that was attended by over 28,000 people.

On April 9, 2017, Radiohead performed at the arena for the first time during their A Moon Shaped Pool tour. It was also their first concert in Portland since 1996.

On October 1, 2019, AJR headlined the theater in Moda Center for their Neotheater World Tour.

The exterior of Moda Center was featured in How I Met Your Mother's 2011 episode, Tick Tick Tick; again in the 2013 episode Platonish, and the series finale episode, Last Forever.

The exterior of Moda Center was also featured in iCarly's 2009 episode, iFight Shelby Marx.

On August 22, 2021, Guns N' Roses played a show as part of their 2020 Tour.

On November 8, 2021, Harry Styles performed a sold-out show as part of his Love On Tour.

On March 29, 2022, Dua Lipa performed a sold-out show as part of her Future Nostalgia Tour.

On April 5, 2022, Olivia Rodrigo performed a sold-out show as the first show on her Sour Tour.

On June 27, 2022, Shawn Mendes performed a sold-out show, as the first show on his Wonder: The World Tour.

On November 4, 2022, Lizzo performed a sold-out show on her The Special Tour. 6 days later, on November 10, 2022, she performed another sold-out show on the same tour.

On April 24, 2024, AJR performed their second show in the arena.

On August 10, 2024, Olivia Rodrigo performed her second show in the arena on her Guts World Tour.

On September 5, 2024, Gracie Abrams kicked off her The Secret of Us Tour with a sold-out show.

On December 8, 2024, Billie Eilish performed a sold-out show on her Hit Me Hard and Soft: The Tour.

On April 20, 2025, Phish performed their first show in Portland in over 25 years in the arena.

On September 19, 2025, Linkin Park performed a show at the arena as part of the From Zero World Tour promoting their eighth studio album, From Zero.

On September 8, 2026, Tame Impala performed a live show at the arena as a part of the Deadbeat Tour promoting his studio album of the same name.

On September 11, 2026, Weezer performed at the arena as part of the Gathering tour, as promotion for their album of the same name.

== See also ==
- List of sports venues in Portland, Oregon
- List of indoor arenas in the United States
- Veterans Memorial Coliseum (Portland, Oregon)
- List of indoor arenas by capacity

Events and tenants
| Preceded by Memorial Coliseum | Home of the Portland Trail Blazers; 1995 – present | Succeeded by current |
