= C.E.O. (song) =

Single by Weezer

from the album Weezer (Gold Album)
- Released: August 5, 2026
- Length: 2:54
- Label: Reprise; Warner
- Songwriter: Rivers Cuomo
- Producers: Klas Åhlund; Kenneth Blume

Weezer singles chronology
"We Might as Well Be Strangers" (2026])	"C.E.O." (2026)

Music video
- "C.E.O." on YouTube

"C.E.O." is a song by American rock band Weezer. It serves as the third single for their twentieth album, Weezer (also referred to as the "Gold Album"), and was released on August 5, 2026.

== Background ==
In 2023, Rivers Cuomo and Brian Bell teased the song as a "meta and mind-bending" sequel to the band's first single, "Undone – The Sweater Song".

== Composition and lyrics ==
The song opens as a complaint about fan service, with Cuomo saying over the intro, "Wish I could do something new, but nobody wants to hear that/They just want the classics".

== Reception ==
Consequence of Sound said the idea of the song "Admittedly doesn’t sound great on paper, but it’s heartening that everything about the song feels real" and then described the song as "compelling" and "wicked".

== Music video ==
The video pays homage to the song's inspiration, "Undone – The Sweater Song", by having the band perform for two C.E.O.s in a replica of the music video's set, though the backdrop is now gold, not blue. Cuomo then complains about being "stuck in the past" and the band leaves the set, only to be replaced by look-alikes.

The video features appearances by Tony Hawk, Curry Barker, Dax Flame, Jay Renshaw, Rob Riggle, Rob Huebel, Michael Peña, Giovanni Ribisi, and Christopher Mintz-Plasse.

== Personnel ==
Credits adapted from Tidal.

=== Weezer ===
- Rivers Cuomo – vocals, guitar
- Brian Bell – vocals, guitar
- Scott Shriner – vocals, bass
- Patrick Wilson – vocals, guitar, drums

=== Technical ===
- Klas Åhlund – production
- Kenneth Blume – production
- Dale Becker – mastering
- Adam Burt – assistant mastering engineer
- Katie Harvey – assistant mastering engineer
- Josh Gudwin – mixing
- Felix Byrne – assistant mixer
- Daniel McNeill – recording engineer
- Ryan Nasci – additional engineer
- Tovi Schenk – assistant engineer
