= Now You See Me (soundtrack) =

Now You See Me (Original Motion Picture Soundtrack)

Film score by Brian Tyler
- Released: May 28, 2013
- Recorded: 2013
- Genre: Soundtrack
- Length: 51:21
- Label: Glassnote
- Producer: Brian Tyler

Brian Tyler chronology
Iron Man 3 (2013)	Now You See Me (Original Motion Picture Soundtrack) (2013)	Standing Up (2013)

Singles from Now You See Me (Original Motion Picture Soundtrack)
- 1. "Entertainment" Released: 19 February 2013

Now You See Me (Original Motion Picture Soundtrack) is the soundtrack to the 2013 film Now You See Me directed by Louis Leterrier. The film's original score is composed by Brian Tyler and features songs performed by the Two Door Cinema Club, Phoenix, Zedd and Galactic. The soundtrack was released digitally and physically on May 28, 2013 through Glassnote Records.

== Development ==
In March 2012, it was reported that the Chemical Brothers—an electronic music duo formed by Ed Simons and Tom Rowlands—would score the film. Later in January 2013, David Sardy had replaced the duo as the composer, before in that March, another replacement with Brian Tyler scoring the film in place of Sandy. Tyler signed the film immediately after finishing the score for Iron Man 3 (2013). According to Tyler, the music for the film was different from his previous works as it is a combination of multiple musical styles. Tyler utilized modern strings to reflect the caper nature of the film and live music that reflects the James Bond music from the 1960s and inspiration of Henry Mancini's scores. Tyler played the drums and vibraphone, and used bass, congas and piano to reflect the 1940s and 1950s old-school type band recording and collaborated with the London Philharmonic Orchestra for the orchestral sound. When he read the script for the film, he eventually wrote a piano theme privately which was the first cue from the soundtrack. But despite writing the film, Tyler did not compose much of the cues until the film was in post-production.

== Critical reception ==
In a 5-star review, Filmtracks.com summarized "If its groove does resonate with you, then be prepared to enjoy possibly Tyler's best entry since Children of Dune." Pete Simons of Synchrotones rated 4 (out of 5) and called it as "one of Tyler’s finer efforts and one of the most enjoyable scores of the year". Daniel Schweiger of Assignment X wrote "Brian Tyler comes up with jazzy fun for superheroes of illusion". Scott Foundas of Variety wrote "Composer Brian Tyler’s big, brassy, Lalo Schifrin-esque score stands apart from an otherwise serviceable tech package." Brent Simon of Screen International wrote "Brian Tyler's energetic music puts a spring in the movie’s step, matching up with a solid technical package." The Hollywood Reporter called it as "a techno score that never quits".

== Track listing ==
All music is composed by Brian Tyler, except where noted.

Now You See Me (Original Motion Picture Soundtrack) track listing
No.	Title	Music	Length
1.	"Now You See Me"	Brian Tyler	5:26
2.	"The Four Horsemen"	Brian Tyler	3:34
3.	"Now You See Me" (Reprise)	Brian Tyler	1:49
4.	"Sun" (Jesse Marco Remix)	Two Door Cinema Club	4:45
5.	"Now You Don't"	Brian Tyler	4:21
6.	"Entertainment"	Phoenix	3:38
7.	"Sleight of the Mind"	Brian Tyler	4:45
8.	"Now You See Me" (Robert DeLong Remix)	Brian Tyler	3:40
9.	"Welcome to the Eye"	Brian Tyler	5:49
10.	"Codec"	Zedd	6:01
11.	"Cineramascope" (featuring Trombone Shorty and Corey Henry)	Galactic	3:14
12.	"Now You See Me" (Spellbound Remix)	Brian Tyler	4:19
Total length:			51:21

== Personnel ==
Credits adapted from liner notes.

- Music composer and producer – Brian Tyler
- Co-producer – Paul Katz
- Performer – London Philharmonic Orchestra
- Engineer – Peter Fuchs, Simon Rhodes
- Mixing – Gregory Hayes
- Mastering – Roman Vail
- Score editor – Adam Smalley, Clint Bennett
- Assistant score editor – Gary Krause, Scott Johnson
- Music consultant – Julia Michels
- Copyist – Jill Streater
- Layout and design – Sam Oshin
