= We Might as Well Be Strangers =

2026 single by Weezer featuring Wednesday

Single by Weezer featuring Wednesday

from the album Weezer (Gold Album)
- Released: June 3, 2026
- Genre: Alternative rock; power pop
- Length: 3:34
- Label: Reprise; Warner
- Songwriters: Brian Bell; Rivers Cuomo; Allan Grigg; Karly Hartzman; Luther Russell
- Producers: Klas Åhlund; Kenneth Blume

Weezer singles chronology
"Shine Again" (2026)	"We Might as Well Be Strangers" (2026)	"C.E.O." (2026)

Wednesday singles chronology
"Townies" (2025)	"We Might as Well Be Strangers" (2026)

Music video
- "We Might as Well Be Strangers" on YouTube

"We Might as Well Be Strangers" is a song by the American rock band Weezer featuring American rock band Wednesday. It was released on June 3, 2026, as the second single for their twentieth (Note: Despite being widely marketed as EPs, Weezer frontman Rivers Cuomo considers the SZNZ series of EPs to be individual studio albums.) studio album, Weezer (also known as the Gold Album), alongside a music video and the announcement of the album's title and release date.

The track features guest appearances from Wednesday band members Karly Hartzman and Xandy Chelmis. It is Weezer's first single to feature another artist since 2014's "Go Away", which featured Best Coast's Bethany Cosentino, which became a viral hit in 2026.

== Critical reception ==
The song received positive reviews from critics. Rock Revival called the song, "a direct, raw iteration of the band as urgent and vital as anything else in their catalog three decades in". JamBase said, "'We Might As Well Be Strangers' is a hard-hitting track playing into Weezer’s strengths as Hartzman splits verses with frontman Rivers Cuomo before their two voices intertwine".

== Live performances ==
Weezer performed the song with Nikki Monninger, the bassist for Silversun Pickups, on The Tonight Show Starring Jimmy Fallon. Cuomo was dressed in an all gold costume while Monninger wore a gold dress.

== Personnel ==
Credits adapted from Tidal.

=== Weezer ===
- Rivers Cuomo – lead vocals, guitar
- Brian Bell – guitar, vocals
- Patrick Wilson – drums, vocals, guitar
- Scott Shriner – bass, vocals

=== Wednesday ===
- Karly Hartzman – lead vocals
- Xandy Chelmis – pedal steel guitar

=== Technical ===
- Klas Åhlund – production
- Kenneth Blume – production
- Dale Becker – mastering
- Adam Burt – assistant mastering engineer
- Katie Harvey – assistant mastering engineer
- Josh Gudwin – mixing
- Felix Byrne – assistant mixer
- Daniel McNeill – recording engineer
- Ryan Nasci – additional engineer
- Tovi Schenk – assistant engineer

== Charts ==
Weekly chart performance for "We Might as Well Be Strangers"
Chart (2026)	Peak position
Canada Modern Rock (Billboard Canada)	9
Canada Rock (Billboard)	18
US Rock & Alternative Airplay (Billboard)	7
