= Shine Again =

Single by Weezer

from the album Weezer (Gold Album)
- Released: April 1, 2026
- Recorded: January 2026
- Genre: Power pop
- Length: 4:05
- Label: Reprise; Warner
- Songwriter: Patrick Wilson
- Producers: Kenneth Blume; Klas Åhlund

Weezer singles chronology
"Buddy Holly" / "Say it Ain't So" (with Olivia Rodrigo)" (2025)	"Shine Again" (2026)	"We Might as Well Be Strangers" (2026)

Music video
- "Shine Again" on YouTube

"Shine Again" is a song by the American rock band Weezer. It was released as the lead single from their twentieth (Note: Despite being widely marketed as EPs, Weezer and frontman Rivers Cuomo consider the SZNZ series of EPs to be each individual studio albums.) album Weezer (also known as the Gold Album) on April 1, 2026, along with a lyric video and the announcement of the album. This song marks the first release on their new label, Reprise Records, who they announced their signing with alongside the single's release.

The song had been distributed by the band during an intimate concert performance that occurred a week before release, with the song available on USB drives given out to fans who attended the show.

== Background ==
Kenneth Blume, who produced the song, stated that he and co-producer Klas Åhlund "discussed incorporating "tones from desert rock bands like Kyuss...kind of like stoner metal tones. Nothing to do with the writing, just as references sonically." He also stated that, before recording the song, he "studied [the White Album] because [he] wasn't familiar," and that "I studied a lot of Weezer, really really hard. Every day and night before and after I was with them. Absolutely 0 exaggeration".

In an interview with KROQ-FM, Cuomo said that he personally interprets the new song as "confidence in ourselves again, and just trusting ourselves as a four-piece creative unit, and saying the sun is shining within us and to look there for inspiration".

"Shine Again" is the first Weezer song to be written completely by drummer Patrick Wilson since "In the Mall", a song off their seventh studio album, Raditude (2009), and the band's first single to be written completely by him.

== Personnel ==
Credits adapted from Tidal.

=== Weezer ===
- Rivers Cuomo – lead vocals, guitar
- Brian Bell – guitar
- Patrick Wilson – drums, vocals, guitar
- Scott Shriner – bass

=== Technical ===
- Klas Åhlund – production
- Kenneth Blume – production
- Dale Becker – mastering
- Adam Burt – assistant mastering engineer
- Katie Harvey – assistant mastering engineer
- Josh Gudwin – mixing
- Felix Byrne – assistant mixer
- Daniel McNeill – recording engineer
- Ryan Nasci – additional engineer
- Tovi Schenk – assistant engineer

== Critical reception ==
Gil Kaufman of Billboard called the song "bombastic" and "triumphant" in his positive review of the single, while Emily Garner of Kerrang! described the track as "uplifting". Paulo Ragusa of Consequence of Sound said, "the band dials back into their core power-pop style and escalates "Shine Again" to rousing heights" in his review of the single.
