= Iron Man 3 (soundtrack) =

2013 film score by Brian Tyler

Iron Man 3 (Original Motion Picture Soundtrack) is the film score for the Marvel Studios film, Iron Man 3 by Brian Tyler, released on April 30, 2013. A separate soundtrack and concept album titled, Iron Man 3: Heroes Fall (Music Inspired by the Motion Picture) by various artists was released on the same date by Hollywood Records and Marvel Music.

== Iron Man 3 (Original Motion Picture Soundtrack) ==
Iron Man 3 (Original Motion Picture Soundtrack)

Film score by Brian Tyler
- Released: April 30, 2013
- Studio: Abbey Road Studios
- Genre: Film score
- Length: 75:53
- Labels: Hollywood; Marvel Music
- Producer: Brian Tyler

Brian Tyler chronology
Army of Two: The Devil's Cartel (2013)	Iron Man 3 (Original Motion Picture Soundtrack) (2013)	Now You See Me (2013)

Professional ratings
Review scores
Source	Rating
Empire	4/5 stars
Allmusic	3.5/5 stars

Composer Brian Tyler acknowledged that the film's score needed to be darker and more melodic than Ramin Djawadi and John Debney's previous scores, citing the change in Tony Stark's life following the events of The Avengers as the catalyst.

The score was recorded at Abbey Road Studios by the London Philharmonic Orchestra.

=== Track listing ===
All music is composed by Brian Tyler.

No.	Title	Length
1.	"Iron Man 3"	2:24
2.	"War Machine"	7:19
3.	"Attack on 10880 Malibu Point"	4:36
4.	"Isolation"	2:01
5.	"Dive Bombers"	2:24
6.	"New Beginnings"	3:55
7.	"Extremis"	5:07
8.	"Stark"	4:32
9.	"Leverage"	2:16
10.	"The Mandarin"	2:37
11.	"Heat and Iron"	5:43
12.	"Misfire"	3:27
13.	"Culmination"	2:30
14.	"The Mechanic"	3:44
15.	"Hot Pepper"	4:42
16.	"Another Lesson From Mandy"	2:57
17.	"Dr. Wu"	2:41
18.	"Return"	6:20
19.	"Battle Finale"	3:57
20.	"Can You Dig It (Iron Man 3 Main Titles)"	2:42

=== Charts ===
Weekly chart performance for Iron Man 3 (Original Motion Picture Soundtrack)
Chart (2013)	Peak position
UK Soundtrack Albums (OCC)	10

== Iron Man 3: Heroes Fall (Music Inspired by the Motion Picture) ==
Iron Man 3: Heroes Fall (Music Inspired by the Motion Picture)

Soundtrack album by Various Artists
- Released: April 30, 2013
- Labels: Hollywood; Marvel Music
- Producers: Mitchell Leib; Dave Jordan

Professional ratings
Review scores
Source	Rating
Allmusic	2/5 stars
Melodic.net	3.5/5 stars

=== Track listing ===
Iron Man 3: Heroes Fall
No.	Title	Writer(s)	Producer(s)	Length
1.	"Ready Aim Fire" (performed by Imagine Dragons)	Dan Reynolds; Alexander Grant; Josh Mosser	Alex da Kid	4:01
2.	"Some Kind of Joke" (performed by Awolnation)	Aaron R. Bruno	Bruno	4:54
3.	"Some Kind of Monster" (performed by Neon Trees)	Tyler Glenn; Sam Hollander; Dave Katz	Hollander; Katz; Steve Shebby (co.)	3:48
4.	"American Blood" (performed by Passion Pit)	Michael Angelakos		4:24
5.	"No Time" (performed by Rogue Wave)	Zack Rogue		3:16
6.	"One Minute More" (performed by Capital Cities)	Ryan Merchant; Sebu Simonian	Merchant; Simonian	3:40
7.	"Back to the Start" (performed by Mr Little Jeans)	Monica Birkenes; Alexander Burke; Brian Tyler	Tim Anderson; Birkenes (co.); Drew McFadden (co.)	4:06
8.	"Keep Moving" (performed by Andrew Stockdale (of Wolfmother))	Stockdale	Stockdale	3:02
9.	"Redemption" (performed by Redlight King)	Mark Kasprzyk; Wally Gagel	Gagel; Xandy Barry; Kasprzyk (co.)	3:40
10.	"Big Bad Wolves" (performed by Walk the Moon)	Nicholas Petricca; Eli Maiman; Kevin Ray; Sean Waugman	Walk the Moon	2:10
11.	"Bad Guy" (performed by 3OH!3)	3OH!3	3OH!3	3:07
12.	"Let's Go All the Way" (performed by The Wondergirls featuring Ashley Hamilton and Robbie Williams)	Gary Lee Cooper	Jay Gordon	4:28

=== Charts ===
Weekly chart performance for Iron Man 3: Heroes Fall (Music Inspired by the Motion Picture)
Chart (2013)	Peak position
UK Soundtrack Albums (OCC)	25
US Billboard 200	16
US Soundtrack Albums (Billboard)	1

== Additional music ==
Music not included in the Iron Man 3 soundtrack, but featured in the film:

Title	Length	Performer(s)	Key Scenes/Notes
"Blue (Da Ba Dee)"	4:40	Eiffel 65	Heard in the opening flashback scene set in 1999, the year the song was released. A special Mandarin Chinese version was created and sung by Eiffel 65 lead singer Jeffrey Jey and keyboardist Maurizio Lobina to be used in the Chinese release of the film.
"Mambo No. 5 (A Little Bit of...)"	3:39	Lou Bega	Played in the background during the flashback scene set in 1999.
"Jingle Bells" (Bombay Dub Orchestra Remix)	3:45	Joe Williams	Played while Tony first tries out his Mark 42 armor.
"Santa Claus Is Back In Town"	2:25	Elvis Presley	
