= Weezer (Gold Album) =

Studio album by Weezer
- Released: August 21, 2026
- Recorded: October 7–December 2025; January 5–February 6, 2026
- Studios: Putnam Hill, Los Angeles
- Genres: Alternative rock; power pop; grunge
- Length: 32:48
- Labels: Reprise; Warner; Crush
- Producers: Klas Åhlund; Kenneth Blume

Weezer chronology
SZNZ: Winter (2022)	Weezer (2026)

Singles from Weezer
- 1. "Shine Again" Released: April 1, 2026; 2. "We Might as Well Be Strangers" Released: June 3, 2026; 3. "C.E.O." Released: August 5, 2026

Weezer (also known as the Gold Album) is the twentieth studio album by the American alternative rock band Weezer, released on August 21, 2026 on Reprise Records and Crush Music physically, and Warner Records digitally. Produced by Klas Åhlund and Kenneth Blume, the album was preceded by the singles "Shine Again", "We Might as Well Be Strangers" and "C.E.O.".

Inspired by the collaborative nature of working on a forthcoming feature film together, the writing and recording sessions marked a return to all four band members – Rivers Cuomo, Patrick Wilson, Brian Bell and Scott Shriner – working together as creative equals, with Wilson noting: "We finally got our mission statement. Let’s just work together."

Released to positive reviews from critics, it was the band's first studio release in four years since SZNZ, the band's series of four mini-albums released in 2022, and their first full-length album since Van Weezer in 2021.

== Background ==
In 2022, Weezer released four seasonal mini-albums across the year under the name SZNZ, with the band announcing a six-night Broadway concert residency to perform the new material. The concerts were ultimately cancelled "due to low ticket sales and unbelievably high expenses," with the band also cancelling a planned boxset of the albums. Instead of the Broadway residency, SZNZ was promoted with the Indie Rock Road Trip, a concert tour.

Shortly after, the band began working on new material, alongside an improvised comedy feature film directed by Henry Joost and Ariel Schulman. The yet-to-be-released film will star the band itself, alongside Keanu Reeves, Ben Schwartz, Eric Andre, Johnny Knoxville, Joseph Gordon-Levitt and Rainn Wilson.

Through working on the feature film together as a band, frontman Rivers Cuomo was impressed with the acting and improvised contributions of his bandmates, Brian Bell, Patrick Wilson and Scott Shriner, with Wilson noting: "It was so collaborative that Rivers was like, 'Hey, you know, I really love this. I really love how everyone’s just bringing what they do.'" Cuomo elaborated: "I have never had so much fun as I did working with these guys during that time. We were improv acting and joking around, but it was so funny and so fun. And at the end of that process, I was like, ‘Wow, if only record-making could be that much fun, and feel so collaborative, and like we’re playing off of each other’s energy, and making stuff up together in the moment.’ And so I wanted to head into the making of this record with the goal of having that much fun with these guys."

The band carried this collaborative nature into sessions for a new studio album, with the band opting to start afresh with new material in Orange County, California. For several months, the four-piece worked on songs together in the living room of Panic! at the Disco drummer Dan Pawlovich's house. Wilson described the songwriting sessions as "kind of a rebirth, in a cool way."

== Recording ==
For the first time, Cuomo deferred to Wilson's taste and judgement throughout the recording process, noting: "I had this super-strong instinct that I wanted Pat to take a turn at the wheel, as far as the overall aesthetic of the album. I come from a more grid-like background — I grew up on Metallica records where everything is super precise and machine-like. But I just had this feeling like, man, if we make the kind of record Patrick would actually listen to, that could be a real sweet spot for Weezer." Bass guitarist Shriner praised the chemistry between himself and Wilson during the sessions, noting: "Lately, we’ve been communicating and coming together and really playing like a kind of rhythm section that I have always wanted us to be.”

The band reached out to Swedish producer Klas Åhlund to produce the album, with Cuomo being a fan of his work on the Ghost albums Meliora (2015) and Impera (2022). Åhlund suggested that the band also work with producer Kenneth Blume, who had produced Geese's acclaimed album, Getting Killed (2025), and had recently worked with Åhlund in producing Show Me the Body's fourth studio album, Alone Together (2026), together as a team. The band credited Blume with bringing a "brutal, raw energy" to the recording sessions. Blume specifically favoured a small Gibson guitar amplifier from the 1940s during the recording process: "It looks like something you’d buy in a Sears catalog back in the mid-20th century. But if you turn it up all the way, it sounds brutal. It’s actually quite a bit like what our guitars sounded like before we made the Blue Album, before we started working with Ric Ocasek. It felt like coming home."

The album was recorded to tape, with the band eschewing a digital approach. Wilson, in turn, recorded his drums without a click track, noting: "You get a certain kind of tightness when you’re not playing along to a click track [...] It breathes and moves, but it’s just so together." Shriner praised the sessions for bringing all four band members together in the studio at the same time, and described the analogue approach as having "actually some life in the music that I haven’t felt in such a long time."

During the sessions, producer Blume introduced the band to the music of the indie rock band Wednesday. Following the unexpected resurgence of Weezer's 2014 single "Go Away", which went on to become one of the band's highest streaming songs in 2026 and featured a duet with Best Coast frontwoman Bethany Cosentino, the band reached out to Wednesday frontwoman Karly Hartzman and the band's pedal steel player Xandy Chelmis to collaborate on the song "We Might as Well Be Strangers".

== Writing and composition ==
The album marks a return to significant songwriting contributions from drummer Patrick Wilson and guitarist and backing vocalist Brian Bell. The tracks "We Might as Well Be Strangers", "Up in the Clouds", and "The LA Sound" all feature writing credits from Bell's longtime collaborator Luther Russell. Russell most notably co-wrote the White Album single "L.A. Girlz". Additionally, the track "The Show Must Go On" is the first Weezer song to have a writing credit from band historian and assistant Karl Koch, as well as Åhlund.

"C.E.O" was teased by Cuomo and Bell in late 2023 as a "meta and mind-bending" sequel to the Blue Album single "Undone – The Sweater Song". The song was written by Cuomo following the 2022 release of SZNZ, feeling that "fewer and fewer people were listening to them" with each successive release. At the time, he felt torn between continuing the experimental and ambitious pursuits of projects like SZNZ, or creating music that catered to a wider demographic. He later stated "I need to think less like a mad scientist in the research and development department and more like a CEO.", leading to the songs title and premise. "Up in the Clouds" was notably demoed during sessions for Everything Will Be Alright in the End (2014), though the song was initially written in 2006 as "East Coast or West Coast" for their 2008 self-titled release, the Red Album. The album's closing track, "The L.A. Sound", was originally written by Bell and Russell for the White Album, but the song was rejected by the album's producer Jake Sinclair and remained shelved until the recording of Gold began.

Reflecting on the band's decision to make this their "gold" album, Bell noted: "Gold doesn’t necessarily represent what you would think, which is having a hit, or currency, or gold-plated. It’s more in line with the expression ‘Stay gold,’ which Ponyboy says in The Outsiders, which essentially means having a sense of wonder. This album is about getting back to that sense of wonder as a band."

== Cover artwork ==
The album cover is the first in Weezer's color albums to not feature a photo of the band. However, according to the band, it features "four symbols believed to represent its creators".

== Release and promotion ==
On March 26, 2026, Weezer announced a tour titled The Gathering and teased the release of the lead single from the album, titled "Shine Again", which was released on April 1. On June 3, the band fully announced the album and released the second single, "We Might as Well Be Strangers", featuring Wednesday. The second single also received a music video. On August 5, Weezer released the third single, "C.E.O.", and announced international tour dates for The Gathering. A lyric video for "Say Yes" featuring backstage imagery from the band's appearance on The Tonight Show Starring Jimmy Fallon to promote the album was published online with the rest of the album on August 21.

This is Weezer's first release through Reprise Records. They had previously been signed to Atlantic Records since 2016's White Album.

== Critical reception ==
Professional ratings
Aggregate scores
Source	Rating
Any Decent Music	7.4/10
Metacritic	79/100
Review scores
Source	Rating
AllMusic	4.5/5 stars
Consequence	B+
Exclaim!	7/10
Kerrang!	3/5
No Ripcord	7/10
Our Culture Mag	3.5/5 stars
Pitchfork	6.1/10
Rolling Stone	4/5 stars
Sputnikmusic	3.8/5
Under the Radar	8.5/10

Any Decent Music gave the album a weighted average score of 7.4 out of 10 from twelve critic scores. According to Metacritic, it received "generally favorable" reviews based on a weighted average score of 79 out of 100 from nine critic scores.

== Track listing ==
Credits adapted from Deezer.

Weezer track listing
No.	Title	Writer(s)	Length
1.	"Say Yes"	Rivers Cuomo	3:04
2.	"Shine Again"	Patrick Wilson	4:06
3.	"Don't Make It Weird"	Cuomo; Wilson	2:49
4.	"We Might as Well Be Strangers" (featuring Wednesday)	Cuomo; Brian Bell; Allan Grigg; Karly Hartzman; Luther Russell	3:34
5.	"C.E.O."	Cuomo	2:54
6.	"Hoops"	Cuomo; Wilson	2:35
7.	"Nowhere"	Wilson	2:48
8.	"The Show Must Go On"	Cuomo; Wilson; Bell; Karl Koch; Klas Åhlund	3:23
9.	"Up in the Clouds"	Cuomo; Bell; Russell	3:39
10.	"The LA Sound"	Bell; Russell	3:57
Total length:			32:48

== Personnel ==
Credits are adapted from Tidal.

=== Weezer ===
- Brian Bell – guitar, backing vocals
- Rivers Cuomo – vocals, guitar
- Scott Shriner – bass, backing vocals
- Patrick Wilson – drums, guitar, backing vocals

=== Additional contributors ===
- Kenneth Blume – production
- Klas Åhlund – production
- Daniel McNeill – engineering
- Ryan Nasci – additional engineering
- Tovi Schenk – engineering assistance
- Josh Gudwin – mixing
- Felix Byrne – mixing assistance
- Dale Becker – mastering
- Adam Burt – mastering assistance
- Katie Harvey – mastering assistance
- Karly Hartzman – vocals on "We Might as Well Be Strangers"
- Xandy Chelmis – pedal steel guitar on "We Might as Well Be Strangers"

== Charts ==
Chart performance for Weezer (Gold Album)
Chart (2026)	Peak position
Australian Albums (ARIA)	50
Austrian Albums (Ö3 Austria)	35
Belgian Albums (Ultratop Wallonia)	44
Croatian International Albums (HDU)	21
French Albums (SNEP)	198
French Rock & Metal Albums (SNEP)	14
German Rock & Metal Albums (Offizielle Top 100)	15
Hungarian Albums (MAHASZ)	37
Japanese Albums (Oricon)	30
Japanese Digital Albums (Oricon)	13
Japanese Download Albums (Billboard Japan)	7
Japanese Rock Albums (Oricon)	5
Japanese Top Albums Sales (Billboard Japan)	34
New Zealand Albums (RMNZ)	32
Scottish Albums (Official Charts)	5
Swiss Albums (Schweizer Hitparade)	23
UK Albums (Official Charts)	45
US Billboard 200	35
US Top Rock & Alternative Albums (Billboard)	7
