= The Gathering (tour) =

2026-27 concert tour by Weezer

- Tour by Weezer
- Location: Europe; North America; Asia
- Associated album: Weezer (Gold Album)
- Start date: September 8, 2026
- End date: June 1, 2027
- Supporting acts: Silversun Pickups; The Shins; Taking Back Sunday
Weezer tour chronology
2025 European tour (2025)	The Gathering (2026-27)

The Gathering (also known as Weezer: The Gathering) is a concert tour by American alternative rock band Weezer to promote their twentieth studio album Weezer (Gold Album) (2026).

== Background and promotion ==
On March 26, 2026, the North American leg of the tour was announced, with The Shins and Silversun Pickups opening. A few months later, the Japan and Europe legs of the tour were announced, with Taking Back Sunday opening.

== Tour Dates ==
Date	City	Country	Venue
September 8, 2026	Sacramento	United States	Golden 1 Center
September 9, 2026	San Francisco	United States	Chase Center
September 11, 2026	Portland	United States	Moda Center
September 12, 2026	Vancouver	Canada	Rogers Arena
September 13, 2026	Seattle	United States	Climate Pledge Arena
September 15, 2026	West Valley City	United States	Maverik Center
September 16, 2026	Denver	United States	Ball Arena
September 20, 2026	Saint Paul	United States	Grand Casino Arena
September 22, 2026	Chicago	United States	United Center
September 23, 2026	Detroit	United States	Little Caesars Arena
September 25, 2026	Toronto	Canada	Scotiabank Arena
September 26, 2026	Laval	Canada	Place Bell
September 27, 2026	Boston	United States	TD Garden
September 29, 2026	Philadelphia	United States	Xfinity Mobile Arena
September 30, 2026	Brooklyn	United States	Barclays Center
October 2, 2026	Washington, D.C.	United States	Capital One Arena
October 3, 2026	Charlotte	United States	Spectrum Center
October 4, 2026	Raleigh	United States	Lenovo Center
October 6, 2026	Columbus	United States	Nationwide Arena
October 7, 2026	Milwaukee	United States	Fiserv Forum
October 9, 2026	Nashville	United States	Bridgestone Arena
October 10, 2026	Atlanta	United States	State Farm Arena
October 11, 2026	Orlando	United States	Kia Center
