= Another Evil =

- Directed by: Carson Mell
- Written by: Carson Mell
- Produced by: Jeff Keith; Carson Mell; Sebastian Pardo; Riel Roch Decter
- Starring: Steve Zissis; Mark Proksch; Jennifer Irwin; Dax Flame; Dan Bakkedahl; Steve Little
- Cinematography: Drew Bienemann
- Edited by: Alex O'Flinn
- Music by: White Dove
- Production company: Memory
- Distributed by: Dark Sky Films (USA); Horrify (Netherlands)
- Release date: March 12, 2016 (SXSW)
- Running time: 90 minutes
- Country: United States
- Language: English

Another Evil is a 2016 comedy horror film that was written and directed by Carson Mell. The movie had its world debut on March 12, 2016 at the South by Southwest Film Festival and stars Steve Zissis, a man who hires a ghost hunter (Mark Proksch) to rid his house of ghosts but finds that he instead wishes to rid himself of the hunter.

== Synopsis ==
During a trip to their cabin in the woods so that the father Dan can work on his paintings, the Papadakis family experiences supernatural phenomena that prompts them to seek out someone who can rid their house of ghosts. The first person they hire, the laid back Joey, confirms that their house is haunted by two ghosts but tells them that there is no need to get rid of them, as the ghosts are benign and the phenomenon was only them trying to make contact. Unhappy with this, Dan chooses to hire demonologist Os on the recommendation of his friend George, who claims that Os can effectively exorcise ghosts.

Dan chooses to remain in the cabin with Os, who proves to be a very eccentric person prone to over-imbibing and periodic rages fueled in part by his impending divorce. His actions periodically make Dan uncomfortable, however the two bond one night after Os captures one of the two ghosts. Os tells Dan a story about how he caught gonorrhea from the Devil, who appeared to him as a beautiful woman, and Dan confesses that his paintings, which depict a black circle in the middle of a canvas, have no deep meaning to them despite the public claims stating otherwise. Eventually Os's actions become too much and Dan deliberately lies that the remaining ghost left the home due to Os's actions. The two celebrate by drinking aged canned wine, however the following day Os claims that the second ghost has returned. Dan admits that he lied due to Os's strange actions and states that the two are not really friends, which hurts the other man. Shortly thereafter Os comes to the conclusion that Dan accidentally opened up a portal to another realm, bringing over a demon that possessed Dan's son Jazz.

Unconvinced, Dan demands that Os leave the cabin, only to be knocked out and tied up. While he is unconscious Dan's wife Mary and son Jazz arrive at the cabin and are also captured and handcuffed. Os makes several attempts to exorcise Jazz using wind-up toys and cards featuring naked women, which bewilders Jazz, who claims that he is not possessed. Upset that he is not making any headway, Os calls a priest for advice and is advised to kill the demon inside Jazz. He chooses to do so by burying Jazz alive as he had several other items during the course of the film to supposedly rid them of their power.

Left alone in the cabin, Mary and Dan witness the supposedly captured ghost wander into the room and drop the handcuff key, implying that Os is not actually able to get rid of ghosts. Now free, Dan manages to overpower Os and free his son just as the police arrive. The film ends with Dan and his family going to the hospital for care and Os in jail.

== Cast ==
- Steve Zissis as Dan Papadakis
- Mark Proksch as Os Bijourn
- Jennifer Irwin as Mary Papadakis
- Dax Flame as Jasper 'Jazz' Papadakis
- Dan Bakkedahl as Joey Lee Dansing
- Steve Little as George

== Release ==
Another Evil had its world premiere at the South by Southwest Film Festival on March 12, 2016. This was followed by a home video release on Blu-ray and DVD on July 18, 2017 through Dark Sky Films.

== Reception ==
Critical reception for Another Evil has been mixed and the film holds a rating of 67% on Rotten Tomatoes, based on 25 reviews. Common criticism for the film centered upon the mixture of horror and comedy, which Trace Thurman of Bloody Disgusting has stated is "one of the most difficult sub-genres to pull off" and that Another Evil did not do successfully. The performances of Zissis and Proksch were more favorably received by reviewers for outlets such as Collider and RogerEbert.com. Gareth Jones of Dread Central gave Another Evil 3 1/2 stars, noting that it wasn't as successful as the movie Creep as "the threat doesn’t quite feel as prevalent here, with the film definitely erring more often on the funny side – but it remains a highly entertaining, subtly tense jaunt through genre-tinged territory and is more than deserving of your attention." Dennis Harvey of Variety was also critical, writing that "It doesn’t bore, but at 90 minutes it lacks the kind of heft, hilarity or other assertive quality that render its pleasant-enough progress memorable."
