= Moda Health =

Health insurance company

Moda, Inc.
- Trade name: Moda Health
- Formerly: ODS Health
- Company type: Private, For-profit
- Industry: Health insurance
- Founded: 1955; 71 years ago
- Headquarters: Portland, Oregon
- Area served: Alaska, Oregon, Texas, Washington
- Website: www.modahealth.com

Moda, Inc. (formerly ODS Health) is a health insurance company based in Portland, Oregon. The company provides medical and dental insurance in Oregon, Alaska and Texas (and in Washington State before 2016). The Moda Center, a sports arena that is home to the Portland Trail Blazers, and Moda Tower, the tenth-tallest building in Portland, are both named after the company. Moda Health is a member of Delta Dental.

== History ==
Originally started as part of the Oregon Dental Society (now the Oregon Dental Association), the company began as a dental insurance plan. In 1995, the Oregon Department of Justice investigated claims of anti-trust issues related to a most favored nation clause in its contracts with dentists, which led to the removal of the clause. The company announced in 1996 it would move to what became the ODS Tower. In July 1999, ODS moved into the new office building, and the next month sold its former headquarters for $9.6 million to the retirement trusts for Les Schwab Tires and law firm Stoel Rives. ODS changed its name to Moda Health in May 2013, though it kept the ODS moniker for its dental plans in Oregon. Later that year it announced a sponsorship deal with the NBA's Portland Trail Blazers, in which the former Rose Garden Arena would be renamed as the Moda Center. The company is also the shirt sponsor of National Women's Soccer League side Seattle Reign. As of 2013, the company had nearly 1,400 employees and $1.7 billion in annual revenues.

=== ACA's Risk corridor program ===
The risk corridors program under the PPACA section 1342, was a temporary risk management device, modeled on similar successful risk corridors in Medicare Part D, to encourage reluctant insurers into the "new and untested" ACA insurance market during the first three years that ACA was implemented (2014-2016). While the program did succeed in attracting insurers, it did not pay for itself and suffered billions of dollars of losses and funds were to be paid from "general government revenues". Congressional Republicans "railed against" the program as a 'bailout' for insurers. and in 2014, then-Rep. Jack Kingston (R-Ga.), on the Appropriations Committee that funded the HHS "[slipped] in a sentence" — Section 227 — in the "massive" spending bill that said that no funds in the discretionary spending bill "could be used for risk-corridor payments." This effectively "blocked the administration from obtaining the necessary funds from other programs." Moda, and a number of other insurers, suffered financially.

As a result, in January 2016, regulators in Oregon and Alaska temporarily suspended the ability of Moda Health to sell insurance after large financial losses left it with a lack of capital. The restrictions were lifted in February 2016 after the parent company agreed to raise additional funds.

== Moda Health Plan, Inc. v. The United States ==
Moda Health took the case to court and won a "$214-million judgment against the federal government". On February 10, 2017, Judge Thomas C. Wheeler stated, "the Government "made a promise in the risk corridors program that it has yet to fulfill. Today, the court directs the Government to fulfill that promise. After all, 'to say to [Moda], 'The joke is on you. You shouldn't have trusted us,' is hardly worthy of our great government."

On June 14, 2018, the U.S. Court of Appeals for the Federal Circuit Court overturned the lower court ruling, reversing the $214 million judgment. The Supreme Court later ruled in favor of Moda Health.
