= Nick Nervies =

American actor

- Born: January 24, 1995 (age 31); Torrance, California, US
- Occupation: Actor
- Years active: 2006–present

Nick Nervies (born January 24, 1995) is an American actor. He had his breakout with a recurring role as Daryl Black on the HBO comedy television series Curb Your Enthusiasm (2007; 2009).

Nervies later starred in the teen comedy film Project X (2012) and had a recurring role as Milton on the syndicated television series Mr. Box Office (2012–2014).

== Career ==
From 2007 to 2009, Nervies had a recurring role as Daryl Black on the HBO television series Curb Your Enthusiasm.

In 2008, Nervies had a minor role in the comedy film Role Models. In 2009, Nervies guest-starred in an episode of the USA Network television series Monk. He played the role of Norman Walters, which earned him a nomination for the Young Artist Award for Best Performance in a TV Series – Guest Starring Young Actor 14 and Over.

In 2012, Nervies had a starring role in the found footage teen comedy film Project X. He had a recurring role as Milton on the television series Mr. Box Office (2012–2014).

== Filmography ==
=== Film ===
Year	Title	Role	Notes
2007	Awaken the Dead	Zombie	
2007	Hell on Earth	Kurtis	Television film
2008	Role Models	Ronnie's Friend JJ	
2009	The Soloist	Jennifer's Son	
2010	House Broken	Brando	
2012	Project X	Tyler	
2015	November Rule	Lil Sneakerhead	
2018	Cagney and Lacey	Dude 1	

=== Television ===
Year	Title	Role	Notes
2006	Will & Grace	Boy	Episode: "Von Trapped"
2007; 2009	Curb Your Enthusiasm	Daryl Black	10 episodes
2008	Everybody Hates Chris	Boy #1	Episode: "Everybody Hates Doc's"
2008	Chocolate News	Kid	Episode: "Episode #1.5"
2009	Monk	Norman Walters	Episode: "Mr. Monk Goes Camping"
2012–2014	Mr. Box Office	Milton	27 episodes
2015	The Mindy Project	Tyler	Episode: "Road Trip"
2017	Rerouted	Nick	Episode: "Chapter 1"
2018	GLOW	Tyler	Episode: "Mother of All Matches"
