= Project X (2012 film) =

American film by Nima Nourizadeh

- Theatrical release poster
- Directed by: Nima Nourizadeh
- Screenplay by: Matt Drake; Michael Bacall
- Story by: Michael Bacall
- Produced by: Todd Phillips
- Starring: Thomas Mann; Oliver Cooper; Jonathan Daniel Brown; Kirby Bliss Blanton; Dax Flame; Brady Hender; Nick Nervies; Alexis Knapp; Miles Teller
- Cinematography: Ken Seng
- Edited by: Jeff Groth
- Production companies: Silver Pictures; Green Hat Films
- Distributed by: Warner Bros. Pictures
- Release date: March 2, 2012
- Running time: 88 minutes
- Country: United States
- Language: English
- Budget: $12 million
- Box office: $102.7 million

Project X is a 2012 American found footage teen comedy film directed by Nima Nourizadeh, written by Michael Bacall and Matt Drake and produced by Todd Phillips. The film follows three friends—Thomas (Thomas Mann), Costa (Oliver Cooper) and J.B. (Jonathan Daniel Brown)—who attempt to gain popularity by throwing a party, a plan which quickly escalates out of their control. Kirby Bliss Blanton, Dax Flame, Brady Hender, Nick Nervies, Alexis Knapp, and Miles Teller also star.

The film has also been associated with the infamous 2008 house party held by Australian teenager Corey Worthington in Narre Warren South, Melbourne. The party attracted hundreds of people after the address (60 Galloway Drive, Narre Warren), was circulated online and became widely reported in Australian media. Its similarities to the film have led to speculation that the event may have served as a loose influence or basis for some elements of Project X, particularly its depiction of an initially small house party escalating into widespread chaos. However, the filmmakers have not confirmed that Worthington’s party directly inspired the film, and director Nima Nourizadeh has stated that he was not inspired by the event specifically.

The title Project X was initially a placeholder for a final title, but interest generated by the secretive title kept it in place. A nationwide open casting call was employed to find fresh faces. The majority of the cast were sourced from this casting call, but a few with prior acting credits, such as Mann, were accepted after multiple auditions. Filming took place on sets in Los Angeles over five weeks on a US$12 million budget. The film is presented as a home movie from the perspective of an attendee using a camera to document the night's events.

Project X was produced by Silver Pictures and Green Hat Films, and distributed by Warner Bros. Pictures. It was released theatrically in the United States on March 2, 2012, and grossed $102 million worldwide during its theatrical run. Criticism focused on the "loathsome" behavior of the lead characters and the disregard for the effects of drug use. Other reviews considered it funny and thrilling, and equated it to a modern incarnation of National Lampoon's Animal House. Following its release, organizers of various large-scale parties either referenced or used the film as inspiration, with some parties being directly named after the film.

== Plot ==
In Pasadena, high-school students Costa and J.B. plan to throw a party for their friend Thomas Kub's 17th birthday, aiming to increase their popularity. Thomas's parents go away for the weekend, leaving him alone in the house, but warn him not to have too many people over and not to drive his father's Mercedes-Benz CLS. Thomas is reluctant to have the party at his house, but Costa continues with his plan and hires A/V student Dax to chronicle the night's events. While Costa, J.B., and Dax advertise the party throughout the school, Thomas himself invites his best friend Kirby, who has a crush on him, and Alexis, a popular girl in their school whom Thomas has his own crush on. As the boys shop for party supplies, they have a chance encounter with Miles Teller and nervously invite him to the party, only to discover that he has already heard about it through the grapevine and plans to attend.

The trio then visits drug dealer T-Rick to buy marijuana, and Costa steals his lawn gnome to use as a party mascot. As they leave, T-Rick discovers the theft and chases after them, but they escape in Thomas's mini-van. As night falls, the party's start time passes, but no one turns up, and Thomas worries that the party will fail. Suddenly, partygoers arrive en masse, Miles included. Thomas intends to limit the party to the backyard and pool house, with the house guarded by Everett and Tyler, two young security guards hired by Costa. However, more and more people begin arriving, and the party moves beyond their control and into the house. Thomas begins to have a nervous breakdown in the bathroom and Costa and J.B. find him there. After J.B. admits how the party was advertised, Thomas demands an answer from Costa, forcing him to confess that he put ads on Craigslist and on a local radio station, worried that no one would attend, much to his horror. Things escalate quickly as the party draws the ire of the neighbors and the police arrive, responding to a noise complaint. However, the partygoers hide and remain silent, convincing the officers that the party has already ended. The police leave and the party resumes.

Miles Teller smashes T-Rick's gnome, revealing that it contains large amounts of ecstasy tablets, which the partygoers quickly consume, including Thomas and his friends. Thomas kisses Kirby and reveals that he loves her. Alexis meanwhile flirts with Thomas throughout the night and eventually seduces him. Kirby walks in on the pair as they are about to have sex and leaves the party upset, as does Alexis, upset with Thomas running off and being secretly filmed. The party then escalates into violence, property damage and vandalism, which has now spilled into the surrounding neighborhood; it receives televised news coverage with helicopters flying over the house. A dwarf guest drives Thomas's dad's Mercedes into the pool after being forced into an oven by other partygoers earlier.

T-Rick arrives armed with a flamethrower, setting fire to trees, cars, and houses in the neighborhood in search of Costa and in an attempt to reclaim his gnome, forcing the guests to flee and the party to end. The police shoot his flamethrower pack, and it explodes. Thomas, Costa, J.B., and Dax flee with the other guests as Thomas's house (and the rest of the neighborhood) is left aflame, and the SWAT team moves in to retake the neighborhood. By morning, the boys return to their respective homes to discover what punishment awaits them. After his parents return, Thomas's father commends him for throwing such a large party because he thought he was a loser but reveals that Thomas is very much in deep trouble as his college fund will be used to cover the damages. At school, the boys are cheered by the students, and Thomas reconciles romantically with Kirby.

The epilogue reveals that T-Rick survived the explosion and is arrested for his actions; Thomas is convicted for disturbing the peace, contributing to the delinquency of minors, and inciting a riot, but is also voted most likely to succeed by his classmates. Costa and J.B. are acquitted; Costa having an expensive lawyer but awaiting results of three separate paternity tests, and J.B.'s parents convincing the court that he is mentally incapable and unfit to stand trial only for him to ride the short bus for the remainder of high school. Dax, meanwhile, is under investigation for the disappearance of his parents, due to the fact that he lives alone. In his show, Jimmy Kimmel makes jokes regarding the party, whereas Costa invites Jillian Reynolds to his next event during a television interview.

== Cast ==
- Thomas Mann as Thomas Kub.
  Mann had prior acting experience, in the feature film It's Kind of a Funny Story (2010), and was told he could not audition for Project X because the producers wished to cast only people without acting credits. Mann ultimately auditioned seven times before winning the role.
- Oliver Cooper as Oliver Costa.
  The film is Cooper's feature film debut. Costa's confident nature and backstory of being unwillingly moved to the film's setting of North Pasadena from Queens, New York, was developed based on Cooper's auditions, where it was felt he gave the impression of being from New York City, despite originating from Ohio.
- Jonathan Daniel Brown as J.B. The film is Brown's feature film debut.
- Kirby Bliss Blanton as Kirby: Thomas's friend, who has an unrequited crush on him.
- Dax Flame as Dax:
  A friend of J.B.'s hired to chronicle the party. Flame was discovered through his personal YouTube video blog. Describing his character, Flame stated "Because he's holding the camera, my character doesn't have a lot of screen time, but when he does, it's very impactful."
- Brady Hender and Nick Nervies as Everett and Tyler: A pair of children hired as security for Costa's party.
- Alexis Knapp as Alexis:
  A popular high school girl. Knapp's character required nudity, something with which she was initially uncomfortable, stating "I just had a lot of moral issues with it but I got over it and I heard that it's not that revealing. So I'm relieved." Knapp described her character as a tomboy, and was given the opportunity to add to the role, move beyond a "hot chick" archetype.
- Miles Teller as himself: In the film, the fictionalized Teller is both a celebrity actor and college baseball star.

The cast also includes Martin Klebba as the dwarf guest, Rick Shapiro as drug dealer T-Rick, Rob Evors as Thomas's neighbor Rob, Caitlin Dulany and Peter Mackenzie as Thomas's parents, Nichole Bloom as J.B.'s girl, and Jesse Marco as the party DJ. Television hosts Jillian Barberie and Jimmy Kimmel cameo as themselves.

== Production ==
=== Development ===
Producer Todd Phillips described the film as an experiment, after executive producer Alex Heineman provided a basic concept, with the production team sharing tales of memorable parties that they had either attended or heard about. Writer Michael Bacall developed these stories into an outline scenario in one night with the goal of creating the "gnarliest high school party of all time". The remainder of the story was fleshed out in the following weeks. Bacall and Drake were told to "go crazy" with the script, although Bacall confessed "I was a nerd in high school so I never did anything like what's in the movie". Bacall worked on the script generally at nights between simultaneously working on the scripts for 21 Jump Street and Scott Pilgrim vs. the World.

It has been widely speculated that the plot was loosely based around an infamous party held by 16-year-old Australian Corey Worthington in 2008—whose party was also a clandestine, out-of-control event with hundreds of gatecrashers and widespread chaos—although this was never confirmed or denied by any of the writers or producers. Worthington became a viral sensation after being interviewed on A Current Affair by host Leila McKinnon to answer for the damage, destruction, and fear caused by the gatecrashers, and for rebuffing McKinnon's requests for him to remove his glasses. At the end of the film, the character of Costa is also interviewed on TV following the fictional party, and he has a very similar exchange to Worthington as well as being dressed in similar clothing.

Nima Nourizadeh had previously only worked directing music videos and commercials, but he came to the producers' attention for his directing work on a series of party-themed Adidas commercials. Nourizadeh explained to the producers how he would want to develop the script and how he would want the film to look and feel, and he was eventually brought from London to Los Angeles, for what he believed would be two weeks, but stretched to two years. Phillips believed that Nourizadeh's interpretation of the film was compatible with his vision, influencing the decision to hire Nourizadeh in his feature film debut.

Project X was not intended to be the title of the film, but it was kept to capitalize on interest generated by the rumored secrecy surrounding the project. Adding to the secrecy, producers decided to not send full scripts to any prospective cast member, instead providing only watermarked individual pages.

=== Casting ===
To create the impression that the events of Project X had actually happened, the producers decided against casting known faces and instead find completely new actors. Phillips stated that the goal of the open call was to cast "unknown actors" and "real people of all ethnicities," who would not normally be given a chance to star in a film. Phillips and producer Joel Silver decided to create a nationwide open casting call, allowing any United States resident over the age of 18 to audition for Project X through a specially created website. Actors were required to provide videos of themselves telling embarrassing or funny stories, or dancing. However, traditional casting was still employed to allow actors with little professional acting credits to audition. The process allowed traits of the selected actors to be incorporated into their characters, including in several cases, their respective characters taking the actors' names. In casting the three leads, the production avoided solo casting and instead had a group of three actors auditioning together, switching out and adding different actors to see which group worked best together.

The casting of low-profile actors aided in keeping the production budget low by avoiding the larger salaries attached to stars. To prepare for the role and create a believable friendship between the leads, Brown, Cooper, and Mann were sent to Disneyland together and spent a weekend in a cabin at Big Bear City, California.

=== Principal photography ===
"Project X was filmed on eight different camera systems. It's a POV film told by the masses of people who attend the party, which gives it a totally unique point of view on the situation. We also really looked at how best to capture the size of this event and the level of destruction with our resources. For instance, how we could make 200 or so extras look like more than 1,000."

— Cinematographer Ken Seng on filming Project X

Principal photography was scheduled to begin on June 14, 2010, in Los Angeles on a budget of $12 million. Filming took place over 25 nights between 5 p.m. and 5 a.m. on the Warner Ranch in Burbank, California. The set contained a faux residential area featuring multiple houses. The house belonging to Thomas was situated directly opposite the house used by Danny Glover's character Roger Murtaugh in the Silver-produced 1987 action film Lethal Weapon.

The production decided to film on a set because locating a real neighborhood that could be effectively closed off and which would allow filming throughout the evening and early morning proved difficult. Phillips explained that using a real neighborhood would have also proven difficult because of the fire damage required for the film. Much of the set was destroyed as part of filming. The film was largely shot in chronological sequence as repairing the set damage from a later scene to film an earlier one would have been difficult. Mann described the filming as a "party atmosphere", with New York disc jockey Jesse Marco on set performing music even when the cameras stopped rolling to maintain the energy of the cast and extras. Many of the same extras were brought back for multiple nights of filming, and would continue to party between scenes. Periodic takes of up to 20 minutes were made of just extras dancing. During filming, Burbank police were called to the set concerning noise complaints made by nearby residents.

Project X was filmed in cinéma vérité style, only displaying the events of the film through the first-person view of the cameraman observing the party, to create the effect of the audience being in attendance at the out of control party. Nourizadeh stated that the style allowed the film to seem "real" and "show some of the realities of what kids do". Cinematographer Ken Seng and Nourizadeh tested twelve different camera systems before choosing the digital-HD Sony F23 video camera, basing their decision on its ability to handle sudden extreme changes in lighting due to natural daylight and strobe lights.

The film is primarily presented from the perspective of the character Dax and his camera, but Nourizadeh also obtained footage by providing the cast and extras with recording devices such as BlackBerrys and iPhones to capture events occurring outside of the perspective or knowledge of the cameraman. This resulted in hours of unusable footage that had to be observed by Nourizadeh and his team to find segments that could be incorporated into the final film. Nourizadeh stated "when you have real material being shot by real people, it then kind of feels like it is. It is found footage. I hated spending 10 hours looking through bits of flip footage—people didn't press stop, it's like in their pockets. But yeah, it was great, man." Other footage was provided from fictional police and news cameras to give a different perspective on the events.

== Soundtrack ==
The Project X (Original Motion Picture Soundtrack) was released on iTunes and on CD on February 28, 2012, by WaterTower Music. The album features 13 tracks which appeared throughout the film, with songs by Kid Cudi, Steve Aoki, D12, MGK, Nas, and Pusha T.

There is also a promotional video online for Mr. 305 artist Jamie Drastik's song "White Boy Wasted". The song does not appear on the soundtrack album.

== Release ==
Project X held its world premiere on February 29, 2012, at the Grauman's Chinese Theatre in Hollywood, followed by an after party with performances by Kid Cudi, Tyler, the Creator, and The Hundred in the Hands. Party guests were greeted by a Los Angeles Police Department cruiser and a bouncer warning them to keep their clothes on.

The film was scheduled for release in November 2011, but in August of that year the date was pushed back four months to March 2012. The film first received a wide release on March 1, 2012, in Australia, followed on March 2, 2012, by the United States and Canada.

=== Home media ===
Project X was released on DVD, Blu-ray, the UltraViolet cloud storage service and digital download on June 19, 2012, by Warner Home Video. Two versions of the Blu-ray were released: one containing a Blu-ray and UltraViolet copy of the film, and a combo pack containing the film on Blu-ray, DVD and UltraViolet. The Blu-ray version contains an extended edition featuring approximately 6 minutes of additional footage, the theatrical cut, and presents the film in 1080p/AVC with DTS-HD Master Audio sound. The home release also contains three featurettes: "Project X: Declassified", a behind-the-scenes look at the film's production; "Project X: The Pasadena Three", showing the casting of the three leads, Mann, Cooper, and Brown; and "Project Xpensive", detailing how much the damage caused in the film would have cost in reality. The DVD version sold 401,204 units in the United States during its first week, earning approximately $5.9 million, and as of December 2012, it had sold 1,012,223 units and earned $15.5 million from home media sales.

== Reception ==
=== Box office ===
Project X grossed $54.7 million in the United States and Canada, and $48 million in other territories, for a worldwide total of $102.7 million, against a budget of $12 million.

The film opened to $1.2 million in midnight takings from 1,003 theaters in the United States and Canada. Throughout its opening day, the film's release was expanded to 3,055 theaters, where it grossed a total of $8.2 million including midnight takings. The end of the opening weekend saw the film take a total of $21 million—an average of $6,891 per theater—finishing as the number-two-grossing film of the weekend behind the animated family film The Lorax ($70.2 million), and exceeding expectations that it would finish with a gross in the mid- to high teens. Project X was highly popular with males and youth; 58 percent of the opening-weekend audience for the film was male, and 67 percent of the audience was under the age of 25.

Outside of North America, the film had its most successful opening weekends in France ($3.8 million), Australia ($1.3 million), and Germany ($1.2 million). These countries also represented its largest total gross takings, with $15 million from France, $4.4 million from Australia, and $4.3 million from Germany.

=== Critical response ===
On Rotten Tomatoes, the film holds an approval rating of 28% based on 139 reviews. The website's critical consensus reads: "Unoriginal, unfunny, and all-around unattractive, Project X mines the depths of the teen movie and found-footage genres for 87 minutes of predictably mean-spirited debauchery." On Metacritic, the film has a weighted average score of 48 out of 100, based on 25 critics, indicating "mixed or average reviews". Audiences polled by CinemaScore gave the film an average grade of "B" on an A+ to F scale, with young males rating it the highest (A), and males in general rating the film higher (B+) than females (C+).

Criticism against the film focused on the perceived misogynistic and mean-spirited behavior of the characters, and disregard for the effects of drugs. Empire's Chris Hewitt gave the film one star out of five, and referred to the central characters portrayed by Mann, Cooper, and Brown, as "spectacularly unlikable". Hewitt labeled the characters "unrepentant, nihilistic, vile, venal, animalistic, avaricious, charmless, entitled, sub-Kardashian, stunningly irresponsible brats". Hewitt ended his review by stating that the film was "possibly the worst film of the last 20 years. It's certainly the worst comedy of the last 20 years". Todd McCarthy of The Hollywood Reporter was similarly critical, calling it "grimly depressing, glumly unfunny teensploitation", but admitted that it would "enthrall a portion of the high school/college age demographic it depicts, just as it alternately outrages, confounds and disgusts other, presumably older audiences." USA Today's Claudia Puig found the film treated female characters poorly, labeling it a "heinous, misogynistic movie filled with faceless crowds and nary a character who resembles an actual human being", a sentiment echoed by Melissa Anderson of The Village Voice who felt the film promoted "skull-numbing hedonism without consequences", and "second-nature misogyny", and that the only purpose of the male characters is to "'get high, fuck bitches.'"

Robbie Collin of The Telegraph called the film "flamboyantly loathsome on every imaginable level" and was critical of the three lead characters, saying "unlike Superbad's leads, these three are poisonously unpleasant, and the supposedly comedic banter between them comes off as bullying." The Los Angeles Times' Robert Abele called the main trio "numbingly predictable" and the film itself "unoriginal", stating the film "bears a cravenly piggish attitude toward rewarding socially unacceptable behavior that feels unseemly rather than exciting".

Neil Genzlinger of The New York Times said that the funny script and skilled editing potentially made it the "Animal House of the iPhone generation". Owen Gleiberman of Entertainment Weekly praised the film for updating the clichés of similarly themed films from the 1970s to the 1980s like Animal House and Risky Business "so that they look just dangerous enough to make nostalgia feel naughty", but stated that the film does not offer anything more outrageous than real parties, despite implying "that it's breaking down bold new barriers of misbehavior". Gleiberman accused negative reviews of "fulfilling the role of all those uptight parents in '50s news reports about the dangers of rock & roll", by applying moral judgments to the events of the film. Time Out's Joshua Rothkopf gave the film four stars out of five, calling it "brainless", but feeling that the sheer anarchy of the film's events were "thrilling". Peter Travers of Rolling Stone praised the film as "gut-bustingly funny" that appealed to a base youth element to become "shitfaced and run amok", and said that it puts its own spin on Animal House. Travers gave particular mention to Mann as "excellent"; however, he also stated that Nourizadeh's filmmaking was a "disaster".

Several reviewers were particularly critical towards Cooper and his character. Hewitt called him "the most annoying movie character since Jar Jar Binks", while others similarly described him as "singularly loathsome, venal and without humor", "supremely annoying", "that dick in a sweater-vest" and a "misogynistic" imitation of Jonah Hill "minus the timing, sad sack appeal and motormouth grace". Conversely, Genzlinger praised Cooper for bringing a "mischievous likability" to Costa that "anchors" the events.

=== Accolades ===
Cooper was nominated for two 2012 MTV Movie Awards for Best Comedic Performance and Best On-Screen Dirtbag, and the film received a nomination for Best Music for the Steve Aoki remix of the Kid Cudi song "Pursuit of Happiness". Project X was listed as the number 1 most pirated film of 2012 on BitTorrent with approximately 8.7 million downloads.

Year	Award	Category	Recipient	Result	Ref.
2012	MTV Movie Awards	Best Comedic Performance	Oliver Cooper	Nominated	
2012	MTV Movie Awards	Best On-Screen Dirtbag	Oliver Cooper	Nominated	
2012	MTV Movie Awards	Best Music	"Pursuit of Happiness" by Kid Cudi (Steve Aoki remix)	Nominated	

== Cultural impact ==
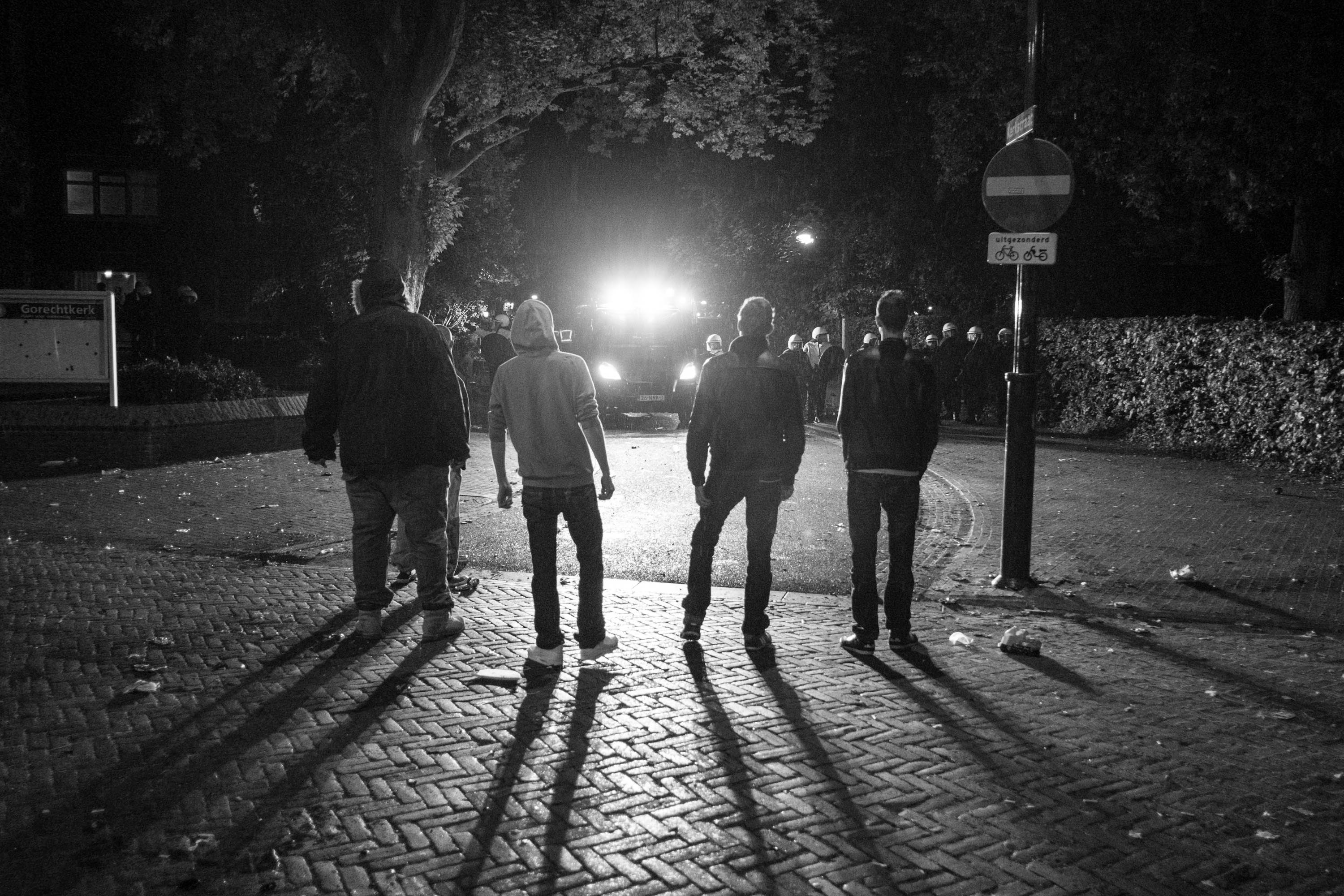
Youths standing in front of police in Haren, Netherlands during a Project X-inspired party in 2012, called Project X Haren

Following the release of Project X, many parties were inspired by the film.

On March 9, 2012, "Project M" became the first event to gain media attention after a party invitation was posted on Twitter by Farmington Hills, Michigan, high-schooler Mikey Vasovski, and was subsequently passed to thousands of users, to the point that the message was being resent once per second, and was posted on Craigslist. The party was dubbed "Project M" by Vasovski, and the invitation contained the address of a foreclosed home where the party would take place. By 9 a.m. on March 9, potential party-goers began arriving at the location, but by 11 a.m. the party had been officially cancelled after police began escorting people off of the premises. Based on his promotional skills, Vasovski was offered a summer internship by Gawker Media.

On March 13, 2012, two separate parties were attempted in Miramar, Florida, and Houston, Texas. In Miramar, people were invited to a foreclosed home to recreate the film as "Project X House Party 2". The promoter was arrested and charged with $19,000 of criminal damage before the party had begun. Police claimed to have turned away 2,000 teenagers who approached the property unaware of the party's cancellation. In Houston, 13 teenagers were arrested after successfully throwing a party and causing up to $100,000 of damage to an empty home. When police questioned the teens about their motivation, they claimed to have been inspired by the film. A second Houston party attracted between 500 and 1,000 guests, but resulted in the death of one person after an attendee started firing a gun when police attempted to break up the event.

On September 21, 2012, a party in the small Dutch town of Haren spiraled out of control after a Facebook invitation. News reports indicated that "There were multiple mentions of an American film called Project X", and that some revelers wore T-shirts reading "Project X Haren". The damage was estimated to be over €1 million ($1.32 million). In 2025, a Netflix documentary was created documenting what occurred in Haren called Trainwreck: The Real Project X.

In 2012, a party called Proyecto X ("Project X" in Spanish) was held in the Pilar Partido of Buenos Aires Province, Argentina. The event gathered 4,500 teenagers who were sold alcohol.

In 2014, a party called "Project P" was thrown in Mecosta County, Michigan, that attracted more than 2,000 people to an isolated farm house. There were go-go dancers, strippers, a fire thrower and two DJs reportedly hired for the party. Dozens of participants were taken to area hospitals after overdosing on drugs (particularly heroin) and alcohol including one reported sexual assault. Police from seven agencies who responded chose to manage the situation from the perimeter because of the risk of hundreds of intoxicated drivers fleeing the scene. Three suspected organizers of the rave were formally charged.

On August 16, 2014, in Mexico in the state of Jalisco in the city of Zapopan a party called La Fiesta de los 4 mil got out of control after a young man named Alejandro Chassin Godoy made an event on Facebook. The party was held on the day of his birthday. A few days after the disaster was revealed the attendance of guests at the event had reached 6,799 people. There were six injured and 281 were arrested. The majority of the guests were young teenagers. According to the Guadalajara Police, the guests had guns and secured 462 grams of marijuana at the party. Chass was fined 2,800 pesos for damages caused at the party.

Rapper Ken Carson's debut studio album Project X (2021) was named after the film, and its artwork references the film's promotional material.

In a 2021 essay for Metrograph, film critic Nick Pinkerton lauded Project X, calling it "an authentic cult object" and writing, "The buzzkill, pursed-lipped Pharisees of a corrupt critical commentariat tried to kill it once, as they do anything that threatens their sense of authority, but it's still raging after the cops have cleared out."

== Sequel ==
On March 6, 2012, four days after its release, Warner Bros. announced a sequel, with Bacall returning to write a script. On May 19, 2015, the studio officially announced that the sequel would be titled Project XX and was initially scheduled for release on August 19, 2016. In December 2021, Jonathan Daniel Brown had commented on Instagram the sequel will "never happen".

On March 12, 2023, Dax Flame released a concept trailer for Project X 2 featuring Jonathan Daniel Brown on his YouTube channel daxflame. At the end of the trailer he ask his fans to share the video in the hopes of getting Warner Bros. attention so they might pick up the project again.

On February 17, 2024, a sequel was officially announced by movie insider Jeff Sneider on his Twitter account, @TheInSneider. "They're gonna do another one of these with female leads and call it PROJECT XX. Subscribe to my newsletter, party people…"

On February 24, 2024, a teaser trailer was uploaded to a YouTube channel named "ProjectxDose," starring lead actors Oliver Cooper, Thomas Mann, and Jonathan Daniel Brown (voice), alongside Miles Teller and Dax Flame. In the video, Cooper contacts the actors and producers of the first movie attempting to convince them to star in, and fund, the sequel he will be directing. Near the end of the video, he convinces Mann to join him, saying that Teller agreed to recreate the party at his house. An official release date was not listed in the video.
