= Jennifer Irwin =

Canadian actress

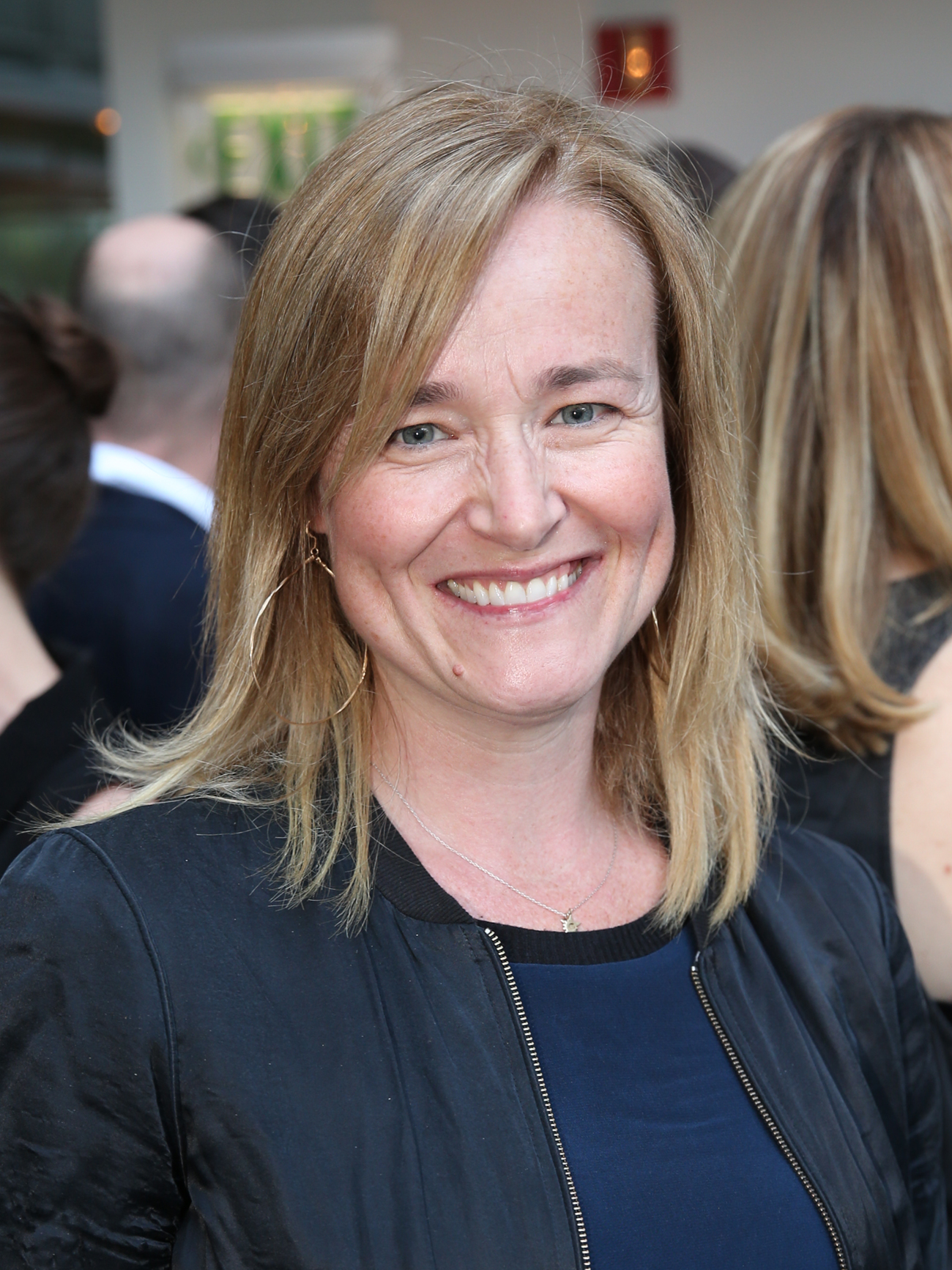
- Irwin in 2015
- Born: 1970 or 1971 (age 54–55); Toronto, Ontario, Canada
- Years active: 1985–present

Jennifer Irwin (born c. 1970 or 1971) is a Canadian film and television actress best known for her roles as Linda Michaels in Still Standing, Cassie Powers in Eastbound & Down, Virginia Kremp on The Goldbergs, Laurie Neustadt in the third and fourth season of NBC's Superstore and Dolly Durkins in the final season of iZombie.

Irwin is a 1994 graduate of McGill University in Montreal, Quebec. She worked with The Second City in the mid-1990s, and has had a handful of starring and supporting roles in film.

== Filmography ==
=== Film ===
Year	Title	Role	Notes
1987	The Gate	Linda Lee	
1996	Mrs. Winterbourne	Susan	
1998	A Cool, Dry Place	Connie Harper	
1999	Superstar	Maria	
2001	Exit Wounds	Linda	
2011	No Strings Attached	Megan	
2011	Bad Teacher	Chase’s Mom	
2015	Zoom	Marissa	
2016	Another Evil	Mary Papadakis	
2017	Fallen Stars	Gwen	
2019	The Mortuary Collection	Margaret	
2021	The Exchange	Sheila	

=== Television ===
Year	Title	Role	Notes
1985	Anne of Green Gables	Student	TV miniseries
1986	Easy Prey	Jenny	TV film
1993	Are You Afraid of the Dark?	Candy Warren	"The Tale of Locker 22"
1997	Melanie Darrow	Leslie Hollister	TV film
1999–2000	The Red Green Show	Anne Marie Humphrey (voice)	"Too Much Information", "The Beaver Dam", "Winston's Wedding"
2000	Harlan County War	Mary Ball	TV film
2000	Twice in a Lifetime	Kristy	"Whistle Blower"
2000–2003	The Gavin Crawford Show	Various	TV series
2001	The Ellen Show	Meg	"Pilot"
2001–2002	Inside Schwartz	Emily Cobert	Main role
2002	Gilda Radner: It's Always Something	Jane Curtin	TV film
2002–2006	Still Standing	Linda Michaels	Main role
2003	Slings & Arrows	Holly Day	Main role (season 1)
2008	Aliens in America	Maureen	"Hunting"
2009	Lie to Me	Mary Clark	"Tractor Man"
2009–2013	Eastbound & Down	Cassie Powers	Main role (season 1), recurring (seasons 2–4)
2010	Better Off Ted	Denise	"The Great Repression"
2010	Party Down	Mona Greengold	"Constance Carmell Wedding"
2010	Raising Hope	Kate	"Toy Story"
2010–2012	Less Than Kind	Susan	"Something Better", "Lawyers and Cougars and Bankers, Oh My!"
2011	Michael: Every Day	Sammy Dunbar	Main role
2011–2012	Breaking In	Creepy Carol	Recurring role
2011–2013	Crash Canyon	Sheila Wendell (voice)	Main role
2012	American Judy	Wendy	TV film
2013	His Turn	Christine Willow	TV film
2013–2023	The Goldbergs	Virginia Kremp	Recurring role (Seasons 1-10); 57 episodes
2014	Motive	Barb Birk	"Abandoned"
2014	Working the Engels	Charisse	Recurring role
2015	Schitt's Creek	Dee Dee	"Little Sister"
2015	Halt and Catch Fire	Cookie Kuempel	"Play with Friends", "Extract and Defend"
2017	The Legend of Master Legend	Suze	TV film
2018–2019	Superstore	Laurie	Recurring (Seasons 3-4); 5 episodes
2019	iZombie	Dolly Durkins	Recurring, Season 5
2025	Grosse Pointe Garden Society	Marilyn	Recurring; 8 episodes

== Awards and nominations ==
At the 6th Annual Canadian Comedy Awards (2005) she was nominated for Pretty Funny Female. She was nominated for a Gemini Award for her performance Slings and Arrows. In 2010, the Canadian Comedy Awards nominated her for Best Performance by a Female in TV for Less Than Kind. At the 1st Canadian Screen Awards in 2013 Irwin was nominated for Best Performance by an Actress in a Continuing Leading Comedic Role for her performance in Michael: Tuesdays and Thursdays, episode "Heights".
