= Dax Flame =

American actor (born 1991)

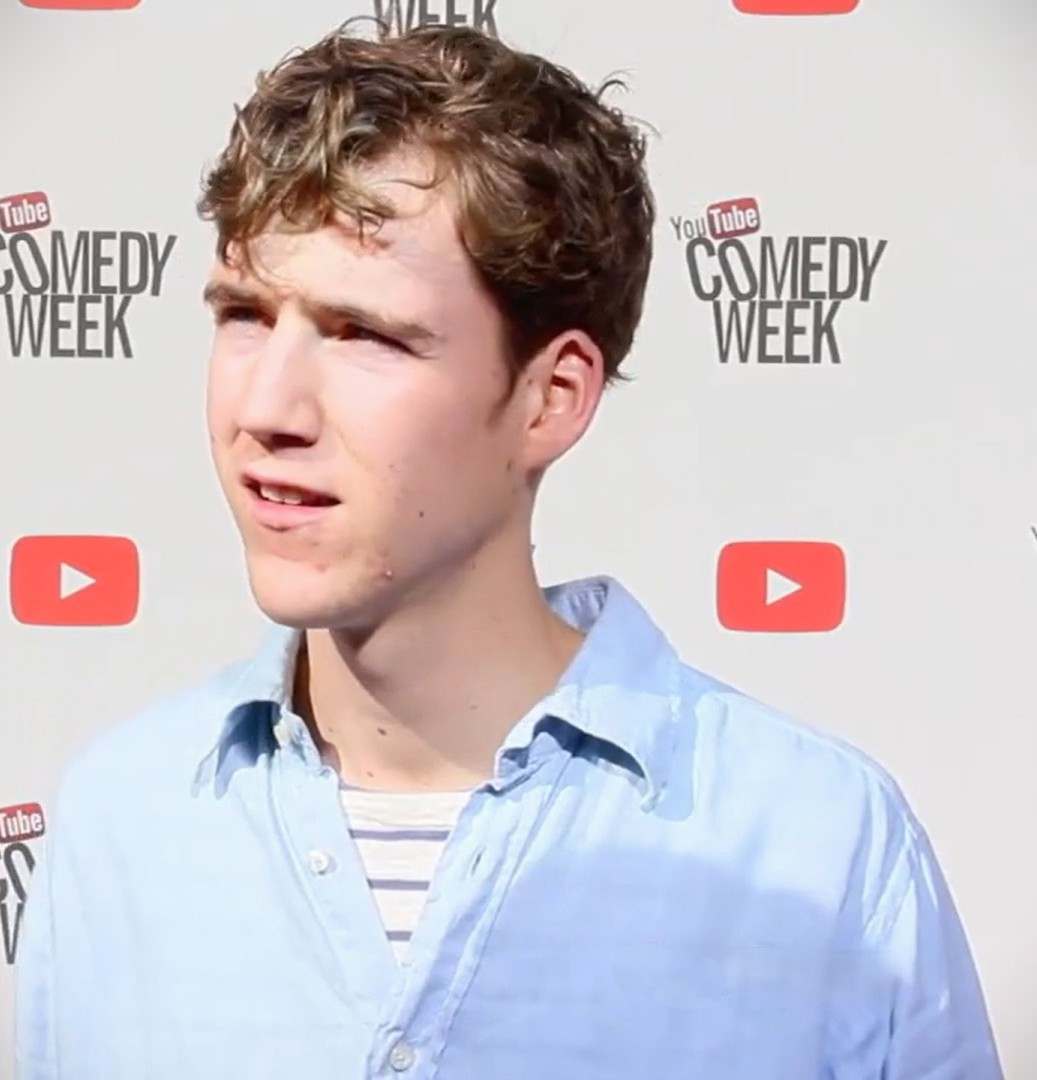
- Flame in 2013
- Born: Theodore Madison Patrello; November 5, 1991 (age 34); Dallas, Texas, U.S.
- Occupations: Actor; YouTuber
- Years active: 2007–present

Theodore Madison Patrello (born November 5, 1991), known professionally as Dax Flame, is an American actor, comedian, and YouTuber. He began his career making diary entry videos on YouTube before transitioning to acting, with a starring role in the found footage teen comedy film Project X (2012). Flame later had supporting roles in 21 Jump Street (2012) and 22 Jump Street (2014), and a starring role in Another Evil (2016). He continues to post comedic videos on YouTube, TikTok and Instagram.

Flame's style of comedy has been described as "endearing nice-guy awkwardness that no one could really say was just a bit or not". Since the start of his career, viewers have wondered how much of his persona is an act.

== Career ==
Originally opening his account in January 2007, Flame initially gained recognition from his YouTube channel, which was at one point one of the top 20 most subscribed channels on the website. He was favored for his honest personality and comedic videos, whether "diaries" (vlogs) or short films. Flame's popularity led to collaborations with multiple other YouTube personalities of the time.

In 2011, Flame was cast in a starring role in the found footage teen comedy film Project X. He was picked for the role due to his YouTube success. Describing his character, Flame stated, "Because he's holding the camera, my character doesn't have a lot of screen time, but when he does, it's very impactful." The film was released theatrically on March 2, 2012. Flame also had supporting roles in the films 21 Jump Street (2012) and 22 Jump Street (2014). He starred in the horror comedy film Another Evil (2016).

He had a cameo role in the film Please Don't Destroy: The Treasure of Foggy Mountain (2023). In 2023, Flame started a talk show called The Hot Seat.

== Filmography ==
=== Film ===
Year	Title	Role	Notes
2012	Project X	Dax	
2012	21 Jump Street	Zack	
2012	The Watch	Teenage Announcer	Credited as “Flax Dame”
2014	22 Jump Street	Zack	
2016	Another Evil	Jasper "Jazz" Papadakis	
2021	Drowning in Potential	Dan	Also director, writer, and producer
2021	Making YouTube	Chad Hurley	Also director and writer
2023	Please Don't Destroy: The Treasure of Foggy Mountain		Uncredited
2023	Goodlongpee the Movie	Himself	
2024	Anyone Else But Me	Levi	
2024	Addy Daddy	Dax	
2024	It Just Takes Time	Reese	
2024	You're Point Girl	Marvin	

=== Television ===
Year	Title	Role	Notes
2025	Haha You Clowns	Will / Gentle Sir / Officer #1 (voice)	Episode: "Movie Night"

=== Web series ===
Year	Title	Role	Notes
2007	Smosh	Himself	Episode: "Three Guys in a Hotel"

=== Music video ===
Year	Title	Role	Notes
2026	C.E.O.	Himself	Cameo appearance
