= Say Yes (Weezer song) =

Song by Weezer

from the album Weezer (Gold Album)
- Released: August 21, 2026
- Genre: Geek rock
- Length: 3:04
- Label: Reprise; Warner
- Songwriter: Rivers Cuomo
- Producers: Klas Åhlund; Kenneth Blume

Music video
- "Say Yes" on YouTube

"Say Yes" is a song by American rock band Weezer. It serves as the opening track on their twentieth album, Weezer (also referred to as the "Gold Album").

== Composition and lyrics ==
The song was originally titled "School Sucks" and was written by Cuomo for his middle-school aged son. The song was later retitled to "Say Yes".

On the track, Cuomo questions his place and his worth in the music industry. The song also features a guitar solo partway through the song that was described as "mind-blowing" by Showbiz by PS.

== Reception ==
Consequence of Sound described the song as "sheer power, as feedback swells into geek rock glory: power-chord fuzz, overdriven guitar leads, distorted bass, swaggering open-hi-hat drumming, and Cuomo’s ever-youthful falsetto". Karina Selvig writing for New Noise Magazine said the song was "a pretty good reminder of why Weezer have managed to stick around for this long" and that "It’s a nice way into the album without immediately throwing everything around you. It doesn’t take many songs before Weezer reminds you that no matter how seriously the band might take the actual music, Cuomo is going to write like he always has". Alternative Press described the song as "an easy earworm".
