= Jesse Marco =

DJ and music producer

Jesse Marco (born 1988) is a DJ/producer/turntablist and model from New York City. Being introduced to the music industry by Mark Ronson and mentored by the late DJ AM, Marco now holds residencies at a number of prominent nightclubs and has performed at events for celebrity clients including Jay-Z and Heidi Klum. Additionally, Marco has played at fashion events for designers including Tom Ford, Giorgio Armani and Alexander Wang.

Marco made his on-screen debut in 2012 playing himself as the DJ in Todd Phillips' party film Project X and has since appeared on the Jimmy Kimmel Show alongside Kid Cudi, promoting Cudi's Rock the Bells tour, which Marco was tour DJ for.

== Career ==
In an interview with StyleCaster, Marco credited his growing up in a musical household for first triggering a musical interest. He continues that when 'he was about 13' his best friend introduced him to turntables and scratching records was something he wanted to do 'probably more than anything else [he] did'. At the age of 18, Marco started interning at Mark Ronson's now-defunct Allido Records where he was introduced to DJ AM. According to Marco, they became close and subsequently DJ AM signed Marco to his label.

=== DJ/Producing Career ===
==== Producing ====
Marco's production career began with his 2012 single “Daddy Cool” [Big Beat/Atlantic Records]. Subsequent releases included the 2014 single, “Superstar” on Glassnote Records followed by a string of remixes for Two Door Cinema Club, Peter Bjorn & John, and The Knocks. Marco's latest single "Bum Bum" was released on Atrak's Fool's Gold Records.

==== DJ career ====
In 2012, Marco headlined the 'College Dropouts Tour' of the U.S. alongside photographer Kirill Was Here, a nightlife photographer. After selecting submissions from students, the DJ and photographer hosted parties at universities including Kansas State University, Michigan State University and the University of Washington.

Marco typically blends hip-hop, house, electro, downtempo, and trap into his DJ sets. Over the course of his career, the DJ has played in clubs including Bang Bang (Singapore), Libertine (London), KKC (Frankfurt), and Kaufleuten (Zurich). In 2016 Marco, will be holding residencies in Las Vegas, San Diego, New York and LA, among others.

Marco has also played fashion events for Alexander Wang, Giorgio Armani, Calvin Klein, Vivienne Westwood, Donna Karan, Diesel, GQ, and Kaws. For instance, Wang hired Marco to produce a mixtape titled "Urban Survival" for his Tokyo pop-up store as a part of a capsule collection. Of his choice to hire Jesse to DJ his Milan Fashion Week runway show, Tom Ford said Jesse's “musical taste reminds me of my childhood.”

In 2013 Marco's friend Kid Cudi recruited him as his personal tour DJ, which included performances on the Rock the Bells tour and the Jimmy Kimmel show.

Some of his other clientele include Jay-Z, Kanye West, Heidi Klum, Alessandra Ambrosio, Russell Simmons and Spike Lee.

=== Modeling ===
Marco has modeled for Marc Jacobs, Uniqlo, Converse, and Stussy.

=== Film and TV ===
Marco made his screen debut in the movie Project X where he appears as himself. The movie was promoted by an eleven-city Vice Magazine sponsored tour with Pusha T and Machine Gun Kelly.

In 2014, New Amsterdam Vodka featured Marco in its television ad campaign

== Discography ==
=== Singles ===
==== As lead artist ====
Title	Details
"Daddy Cool"	Released: 2012-02-07 Label: Big Beat Records
"Superstar"	Released: 2013-03-12 Label: Glassnote Records
"Bum Bum"	Released: 2016 Label: Fool's Gold

==== As Remixer ====
Title	Details
"Sun (Jesse Marco Remix)"	Released: 2013-02-26 Label: Glassnote Records Artist: Two Door Cinema Club
