= Say Yes (short story) =

1985 short story by Tobias Wolff about interracial marriage and identity

- Short story by Tobias Wolff
- Language: English
- Genre: Short story

Publication
- Published in: The Atlantic
- Publication type: Magazine
- Media type: Print (hardback & paperback), e-book
- Publication date: 1985

“Say Yes” is a short story written by Tobias Wolff in 1985. This story is about a husband and wife discussing the issues of interracial marriage. While she feels that race should not be a factor when marrying someone, he disagrees, saying, “how can you understand someone who comes from a completely different background?” The couple's discussion confronts the theories on identity, race, and love.

== Themes ==
The themes of the story revolve around knowledge of self and others and the nature of self within romantic relationships.

The story is ironic. The husband says interracial couples should not marry because they have no hope of understanding each other. Ironically, he fails to see that he and Ann are hopelessly unable to understand each other at the very same moment.

The author also leaves the husband nameless, emphasizing his lack of self-knowledge and Ann’s inability to understand or honestly know him.

Just as his views on interracial marriage reduce complex humans to simple colors that can never know each other, his failure to connect with his wife, in the end, reduces her to a simple color moving through the dark. With the story's final words, she becomes “a stranger” to him.

The ending suggests that both Ann and her husband are correct. The husband is correct that interracial couples can never truly know one another, but only because no one in any marriage can ever truly know their spouse. Ann, by this logic, is also correct that interracial couples should be allowed to marry, as their marriages are no more hopeless than any other couple.

== Characters ==
The characters of this story are Ann and her husband, who remains unnamed. Ann is upset with her husband for his views on interracial marriage. They argue while carelessly doing the dishes. When she becomes upset by his admittance that he would not marry her if she were black, she responds by becoming indifferent, flipping slowly through a magazine. The husband must act similarly. The husband views himself as considerate, for he often helps around the house, but he isn't too concerned if his opinions hurt his wife or if she thinks they're rather stupid. He expects the matter to be dropped when he comes to her aid after she's cut her thumb. He is seen as less than genuine, doing things out of effect rather than sincere desire. Closer to the end of the story, he begins to feel overwhelmed with thoughts of love for his wife, and when he returns from taking out the garbage, he tells her he would marry her no matter what. He waits for a response but is given none. And he waits alone in bed for her, while it seems to him she has become a stranger.
