= Dale Becker =

American mastering engineer

Becker (left) at the 2026 Latin Grammys

Dale Becker is an American mastering engineer who has worked with international artists and bands, including Billie Eilish, SZA, Benson Boone, G-Eazy, Lil Nas X, Sexxy Red, Lola Young, The Kid LAROI, Doja Cat, Doechii, Katy Perry, Playboi Carti, Ravyn Lenae, FINNEAS, Timothee Chalamet, AJR, RAYE, Victoria Monet, NewJeans, Kim Petras, Summer Walker, Yeat, Chris Brown, Jennie, Joji, BoyWithUke, Iann Dior, Snoh Aalegra, Jack Harlow, Justin Bieber, JPEGMAFIA, Tai Verdes, N J B, Jerome Farah, kidprod and 24kGoldn.

== Life and career ==
Becker attended Azusa Pacific University, graduating with a degree in Commercial Music in 2006. After graduating, he joined Becker Mastering, a studio created in 1977 by his father, Bernie Becker, located in Pasadena, California. In his career, Becker has been nominated by the Grammys 6 times, and won the Latin Grammys 1 time.

== Awards and nominations ==
=== Grammy Awards ===
Year	Category	Nominated work	Result	Ref.
2020	Record of the Year	"Talk"	Nominated	
2022	Album of the Year	Planet Her (Deluxe)	Nominated	
2024	Album of the Year	SOS	Nominated	
2024	Record of the Year	"Kill Bill"	Nominated	
2025	Album of the Year	Hit Me Hard and Soft	Nominated	
2025	Record of the Year	"Birds of a Feather"	Nominated	
2026	Album of the Year	Swag	Nominated	
2026	Record of the Year	"Wildflower"	Nominated	
2026	Best Engineered Album, Non-Classical	All Things Light	Nominated	

=== Latin Grammy Awards ===
Year	Category	Nominated work	Result	Ref.
2020	Best Engineered Album	3:33	Won	
