= MJ Lenderman (album) =

Studio album by MJ Lenderman
- Released: June 15, 2019
- Studio: Drop of Sun studios (Asheville, North Carolina)
- Genres: Lo-fi music; Indie rock
- Length: 61:59
- Label: Self-released (reissued by Dear Life Records)
- Producer: Colin Miller

MJ Lenderman chronology
MJ Lenderman (2019)	Ghost of Your Guitar Solo (2021)

MJ Lenderman is the debut studio album by American singer-songwriter and multi-instrumentalist MJ Lenderman. It was self-released on June 15, 2019, but received a more widespread vinyl re-release through Dear Life Records in 2023 after the success of later album Boat Songs.

== Background ==
Before recording his solo debut, Lenderman played with fellow Asheville musicians Indigo De Souza and Karly Hartzman, providing guitar and backing vocals in the latter's band Wednesday. Lenderman recorded his debut self-titled album with the help of some of these earlier mentioned artists, with De Souza providing backup vocals on Left Your Smile and Southern Birds, while Hartzman sang on "Space" and "My Baby Says".

== Release ==
The sound of the record drew comparisons to artists like Jason Molina's work and Neil Young and Crazy Horse.

Originally recorded digitally by Colin Miller, the record was remastered by Heather Jones for its 2023 vinyl release. After this rerelease, the album received renewed attention with Pitchfork's Claire Shaffer giving the album a 7.8 score. Shaffer notes that Lenderman focused more introspective songwriting, before finding "his signature blend of deadpan humor and tight hooks".

== Track listing ==
All tracks are written by MJ Lenderman.

No.	Title	Length
1.	"Come Over"	7:02
2.	"Heartbreak Blues"	7:15
3.	"Left Your Smile"	6:41
4.	"My Baby Says"	4:13
5.	"Southern Birds"	5:22
6.	"Space"	8:12
7.	"Grief"	6:11
8.	"Basketball No. 1"	8:19
9.	"Ghost Town"	8:44
Total length:		61:59

== Personnel ==
Credits are taken from the album's information on bandcamp.

- MJ Lenderman - vocals, guitar
- Owen Stone - drums
- Collin Miller - bass, recording, mixing, mastering
- Lewis Dahm - guitar
- Xandy Chelmis - lap steel guitar

Additional musicians

- Indigo De Souza - vocals on "Left Your Smile" and "Southern Birds"
- Karly Hartzman - vocals on "Space" and "My Baby Says"
- Alex Brown - saxophone on "Southern Birds", "Grief" and "Ghost Town"
