= Bull Believer =

Single by Wednesday

from the album Rat Saw God
- Released: September 8, 2022
- Studio: Drop of Sun
- Genre: Grunge; noise rock; shoegaze
- Length: 8:30
- Label: Dead Oceans
- Songwriters: Karly Hartzman; Alexander Chelmis; Margo Schultz; Richard Alan Miller; Mark Jacob Lenderman
- Producer: Alex Farrar

Wednesday singles chronology
"Feast of Snakes" (2022)	"Bull Believer" (2022)	"Chosen to Deserve" (2023)

Music video
- "Bull Believer" on YouTube

"Bull Believer" is a song by American rock band Wednesday from their fifth studio album, Rat Saw God (2023). It was released by Dead Oceans as the lead single of the album on September 8, 2022. The song was written by the five members of the band at the time and produced by Alex Farrar. It was recorded in Drop of Sun Studios in the band's hometown of Asheville, North Carolina. Characterized by its loud, distorted guitars and lead singer Karly Hartzman's screaming, the song is about the pain of losing someone to addiction.

The song received praise for its length and complexity as well as for Hartzman's vocals. It appeared on Paste and Pitchfork's year-end lists for best songs of 2022. Since its release, "Bull Believer" regularly serves as the closing or penultimate track of Wednesday's live shows.

== Recording and composition ==
This song is an excuse for me to scream on stage, an outlet for the anger and sadness that has been collected by the current and past versions of myself. An offering to myself of a brief moment of release from being tolerant of the cruelty of life: feels like cutting my hair to let go of the history it holds.

— Karly Hartzman

The song, like the rest of Rat Saw God, was recorded in their hometown of Asheville, North Carolina at Drop of Sun Studios. The band signed with Dead Oceans on the final day of recording in the studio.

"Bull Believer" is a two part noise rock, grunge, and shoegaze suite that runs for eight minutes and 30 seconds. The first part, "Bull", depicts a bullfight and is an analogy for losing someone to addiction. It is characterized by the back-and-forth of quieter guitar harmonics (compared in Paste to Sonic Youth's "Bull in the Heather") and "raucous instrumental" of distorted lap steel and electric guitar. The lyrics were inspired by the biography of George Jones in the second season of Cocaine & Rhinestones, which included a tangent about the history of bullfighting in Spain.

After bridging the first and second parts with literal references to bridges, the second part, "Believer", begins with mellow shoegaze riffs. The bullfight analogy gives way to a direct recollection of Hartzman's last memory of a friend who died when she was seventeen years old. The lyrics include references to Mortal Kombat and Augustine of Hippo via Nurse Jackie. Hartzman repeatedly sings "finish him" as the song gradually crescendos, culminating with her full-throated screams. Hartzman was self-conscious about her scream during the recording of the single and opted to record it while the rest of the band was playing Tetris in another part of the studio. In an interview, Hartzman remarked that the recording of "Bull Believer" was "probably the third time [she] ever screamed in [her] life."

== Release and reception ==
The single was released on September 8, 2022, with the announcement of the band signing with Dead Oceans. The accompanying cover art for the single depicts a three-headed doll with human teeth. Hartzman, who created the doll, said the making of the cover art caused her to become more involved in dollmaking subculture and also informed the artwork for the band's next album, Bleeds (2025). The music video was directed by Josh Finck and released on the same day.

The song received positive reviews from critics. Writing for PopMatters, Rob Moura described the song as a "masterpiece" and praised its "length, complexity, and the cosmic power of its closing minutes." In his review of Rat Saw God, Tim Sentz of Beats Per Minute praised the song as the "epic centerpiece that isn't at the center" of the album. While praising the album, Jonah Krueger described "Bull Believer" as "the entirety of the album condensed into one song." Stephen Deusner of Uncut highlighted Hartzman's vocals, writing "Rarely does so much noise convey such raw melancholy."

Pitchfork ranked "Bull Believer" as the 92nd best song of 2022. Paste ranked the song as the fifth best song of 2022. They later ranked it 12th in their "The 100 Best Songs of the 2020s So Far" article, published on October 16, 2024.

== Live performances ==
During their tour for Rat Saw God, the band performed "Bull Believer" as the ultimate song of their sets. Speaking to The Line of Best Fit, Hartzman explained she "does not think about the original memory on stage anymore" during the climax of the song, adding "I channel it into other things I'm upset about to help mitigate that really intense place in my mind that I sometimes feel I have no control over." Wednesday performed the song on the Amazon Music stage at Primavera Sound 2023. Despite being streamed on the music platform, Hartzman dedicated the performance to "any [Amazon] warehouse workers who have ever been mistreated."

During the tour for their 2025 album, Bleeds, the band performs "Bull Believer" as the penultimate song of their set, before ending with "Wasp".

== Credits and personnel ==
Credits are adapted from Apple Music and Bandcamp.

- Karly Hartzman – vocals, guitar, songwriter
- MJ Lenderman – backing vocals, guitar, songwriter
- Xandy Chelmis – lap steel guitar, songwriter
- Margo Schultz – bass guitar, songwriter
- Alan Miller – drums, songwriter
- Alex Farrar – mixing engineer, producer
- Huntley Miller – mastering engineer
