= Exploding Trees & Airplane Screams =

Studio album by Patterson Hood
- Released: February 21, 2025
- Studio: Chase Park Transduction, Athens, Georgia; JackPot Studio, Portland, Oregon; The Panther, Portland, Oregon
- Length: 42:59
- Label: ATO
- Producer: Chris Funk

Patterson Hood chronology
Heat Lightning Rumbles in the Distance (2012)	Exploding Trees & Airplane Screams (2025)

Singles from Exploding Trees & Airplane Screams
- 1. "A Werewolf and a Girl" Released: November 20, 2024; 2. "The Pool House" Released: January 15, 2025

Exploding Trees & Airplane Screams is the fourth studio album by American singer Patterson Hood. It was released on February 21, 2025, in LP, CD, and digital formats, by ATO Records.

== Background ==
Exploding Trees & Airplane Screams was written with inspiration from memories of Hood's earlier years, including those of his relationship, his fascination with Pinocchio, and attended parties. Centering on the theme of introspection of his childhood until his early adulthood, the album features the work of artists such as Katie Crutchfield and Steve Berlin. In an interview with PopMatters, Hood mentioned that some of the songs were written between 1970 and 1994 while several others were written during the COVID-19 lockdown. Hood's piano performance in the album was his first on a recorded project.

Consisting of ten songs, Exploding Trees & Airplane Screams is Hood's first album since Heat Lightning Rumbles in the Distance in 2012. It was produced by his long-time friend and multi-instrumentalist Chris Funk, at several locations in Georgia and Oregon, including Chase Park Transduction in Athens, JackPot Studio, and the Panther in Portland.

The lead single, "A Werewolf and a Girl", was released on November 20, 2024, and features singer Lydia Loveless. Hood wrote it in August 2021 about a relationship with his significant other during his time in high school. On January 15, 2025, Hood released the album's second single, "The Pool House", featuring a music video directed by Frances Thrasher, who also designed the album cover art.

== Reception ==
Professional ratings
Aggregate scores
Source	Rating
AnyDecentMusic?	7.8/10
Metacritic	86/100
Review scores
Source	Rating
AllMusic	4/5 stars
And It Don't Stop	A
Mojo	4/5 stars
Paste	7.8/10
Pitchfork	8.0/10
PopMatters	8/10
Slant Magazine	4/5 stars
Uncut	9/10
Under the Radar	8.5/10

According to the review aggregator Metacritic, Exploding Trees & Airplane Screams received "universal acclaim" based on a weighted average score of 86 out of 100 from 8 critic scores. AllMusic described the album as "the most carefully crafted and cohesive solo effort Hood has released to date," and rated it four out of five. Stephen M. Deusner of Pitchfork stated in his review of the album that "Exploding Trees & Airplane Screams is about the perspective that adulthood brings: the ability to comprehend all the small tragedies that happened (and are happening) around us, not least of which is the distance that imposes itself between our current selves and our foundational memories." Slant Magazine noted that "the melodic, piano-based songwriting and lush, evocative orchestrations that are abundant throughout represent a level of sonic exploration that Hood has never approached before," giving Exploding Trees & Airplane Screams four stars out of five. Andrew Sacher of BrooklynVegan remarked that the composition of the album featured "some gentle acoustic guitar, the occasional fuzzed-out electric, horns, vintage analog synths, and some sweeping string arrangements," while No Depression referred to it as "a powerhouse set from an artist who doesn't conflate self-assuredness with complacency." Paste Magazine assigned it a rating of 7.8 out of ten, calling it "an expansive but subtle collection of songs that include strings, woodwinds and analog synthesizers."

== Track listing ==
All tracks are written by Patterson Hood.

Exploding Trees & Airplanes Screams track listing
No.	Title	Length
1.	"Exploding Trees"	4:17
2.	"A Werewolf and a Girl" (featuring Lydia Loveless)	4:03
3.	"The Forks of Cypress" (featuring Waxahatchee)	5:01
4.	"Miss Coldiron's Oldsmobile"	5:13
5.	"The Pool House"	3:18
6.	"The Van Pelt Parties" (featuring Wednesday)	3:10
7.	"Last Hope"	3:56
8.	"At Safe Distance"	5:19
9.	"Airplane Screams"	4:45
10.	"Pinocchio"	3:57
Total length:		42:59

== Personnel ==
Credits adapted from Tidal.

- Patterson Hood – vocals (all tracks), piano (tracks 1, 2, 4, 5, 9), 12-string electric guitar (2), acoustic guitar (2–4, 8–10), background vocals (5, 8), guitar (5), electric guitar (6, 9), harmony vocals (9), liner notes
- Chris Funk – production (all tracks), synthesizer (1, 2, 4, 9), bass (2, 7), piano (2, 9), Mellotron (4)
- Zach Bloomstein – mixing, engineering
- Greg Calbi – mastering
- Steve Fallone – mastering
- David Barbe – engineering (all tracks), bass (6)
- Steve Drizos – engineering (all tracks), drums (2)
- Dan Hunt – drums (1, 3, 6, 8–10), bass clarinet (5)
- Steve Berlin – baritone saxophone (2), flute (5), saxophone (7)
- Lydia Loveless – vocals (2)
- Phil Cook – Dobro guitar, organ, piano (3)
- Brad Cook – bass (3)
- Katie Crutchfield – harmony vocals (3)
- Kevin Morby – lead guitar (3)
- Stuart Bogie – bass clarinet (4), baritone saxophone (8)
- Nate Query – electric upright bass (5, 8), bass (9, 10)
- Kyleen King – viola, violin (5, 9); vocals (9)
- Karly Hartzman – harmony vocals (6)
- MJ Lenderman – lead guitar (6)
- Xandy Chelmis – pedal steel guitar (6)
- Brad Morgan – drums (7)
- Jay Gonzalez – autoharp, guitar, keyboards (10)
- Lilla Hood – art direction
- Frances Thrasher – cover painting
- Jason Thrasher – photographhy
- Matt Pence – photography
- Patrick Hood – photography
- Tommy Wright – photography
