= Rat Saw God (album) =

2023 studio album by Wednesday

Studio album by Wednesday
- Released: April 7, 2023
- Studio: Drop of Sun (Asheville, North Carolina)
- Genres: Indie rock; shoegaze; alt-country; grunge
- Length: 37:03
- Label: Dead Oceans
- Producer: Alex Farrar

Wednesday chronology
| Mowing the Leaves Instead of Piling 'em Up (2021) | Rat Saw God (2023) | Bleeds (2025) |

Singles from Rat Saw God
- 1. "Bull Believer" Released: September 8, 2022; 2. "Chosen to Deserve" Released: January 18, 2023; 3. "Bath County" Released: February 23, 2023; 4. "TV in the Gas Pump" Released: March 22, 2023

Rat Saw God is the fifth studio album by American rock band Wednesday, released by Dead Oceans on April 7, 2023. It was preceded by the singles "Bull Believer" and "Chosen to Deserve". The album received high praise from critics, praising it as "stunningly powerful" and "riveting". It was noted by critics for its depiction of life in the American South.

It was the band's final album with bass guitarist Margo Schultz, who painted the album's artwork. She was replaced by Ethan Baechtold ahead of the album's tour.

The album was named after the Veronica Mars episode "Rat Saw God".

== Background ==
Wednesday released their cover album, Mowing the Leaves Instead of Piling 'Em Up, through Ordinal Records in March 2022. It received positive reviews from Pitchfork and Under the Radar. The album's sound ranged from country, to Americana, to alternative rock. The band recorded the album after getting an opportunity to record in a studio in Durham, North Carolina with Alli Rogers; the band's singer and guitarist Karly Hartzman said the band recorded a cover album because "Wednesday owes so much to [their] musical influences" and the members' favorite music "is a big part of what brought [them] together". Mark Moody from Under the Radar called it a "one-off placeholder until Wednesday's next full-length of original material comes out".

== Development ==
=== Production ===
Hartzman felt that blending influences of emo, shoegaze, and country made the record have an "original sound […] that hasn't been done [much before]". She was inspired by country musicians and bands such as Lucinda Williams, Tom T. Hall, Outlaw Country, Vic Chesnutt, and Drive-By Truckers. The album presents a Wall of Sound achieved by Xandy Chelmis on the lap steel guitar, the noisy slide sections, and the pedal steel guitar, as well as MJ Lenderman on the album's lead guitar sections.

Hartzman stated that the positive reception toward their third album, Twin Plagues (2021), made her more confident in singing on Rat Saw God; she felt that the confidence can be heard in the album itself. Throughout the recording process, the band utilized overdubbing. In contrast to Twin Plagues, the band were unable to play the songs live before recording them. The band was affected by time constraints and limited time in the studio; Alan Miller said they were getting studio time "as a favor, because [the band was not] on a big label yet". In the studio, Hartzman typically wrote the lyrics and guitar passages, while the rest of the band work out their respective contributions. Hartzman expressed that the album sees the band heading into a heavier sound; she enjoyed the idea of showcasing a heavy song mixed with country aspects. Wednesday signed with Dead Oceans the last day they were in the studio recording the album.

== Release ==
On September 8, 2022, the band announced that they left Orindal Records and signed to Dead Oceans, releasing the single "Bull Believer". On January 18, 2023, the band released the single "Chosen to Deserve" and announced their fifth album, Rat Saw God, which was released on April 7, 2023. The album cover art is a 6' x 6' oil painting made by former bassist Margo Schultz.

== Critical reception ==
Professional ratings
Aggregate scores
| Source | Rating |
|---|---|
| AnyDecentMusic? | 8.2/10 |
| Metacritic | 89/100 |
Review scores
| Source | Rating |
| AllMusic | 4/5 stars |
| Beats Per Minute | 87% |
| Clash | 9/10 |
| DIY | 3.5/5 stars |
| Exclaim! | 8/10 |
| Paste | 8.3/10 |
| Pitchfork | 8.8/10 |
| Rolling Stone | 4/5 stars |
| Slant Magazine | 4.5/5 stars |
| Under the Radar | 8/10 |

Rat Saw God received universal acclaim from music critics. At Metacritic, which assigns a normalized rating out of 100 to reviews from professional publications, the album received an average score of 89, based on 16 reviews.

Reviewing the album for AllMusic, Mark Deming concluded, "Some albums sound like the artists were trying with all their might to make an epic statement in words and music; Rat Saw God sounds like Wednesday had no such lofty aims, but their commitment to the people they write about and their instincts about crafting music to match make this a stunningly powerful work that may well turn out to be a masterpiece." In Beats Per Minute, Tim Sentz claimed that the album is an example of, "a band operating at their highest most infectious potency, and the end result is riveting." Craig Howwieson at Clash described it as, "Finding magic in the mire - Rat Saw God is an emphatic, uplifting reminder of the privilege of being alive."

Writing for DIY, Sam Thirwell stated that, "While some of the stylistic variation here can feel disjointed at times, there's plenty on offer to suggest a band on the rise, capable of rising even higher." In Exclaim, Dylan Barbabe claimed that, "Rat Saw God is wildly ambitious and easily lives up to the industry hype — Wednesday have succeeded once again in twisting nostalgia and existential dread into a braid of bruising, life-affirming rock music." At Paste, Samantha described Karly Hartzman's, "Lyrical precision is what makes the record shine, the fact that Hartzman can recall the exact video game, in this case, Mortal Kombat, that someone was playing when her nose started bleeding at a New Year's Eve party she didn't even want to be at."

Sam Sodomsky of Pitchfork wrote, "Wednesday's noisy, rangy sound finds a home in the quiet, lonely corners of America. Their outstanding new album is why they're one of the best indie rock bands around." In Rolling Stone, Jon Dolan proclaimed that, "There's a Flannery O'Connor story collection worth of Southern fucked-up-ness going on here. But Wednesday are just as interested in sucking you in with a walloping guitar banger as they are in freaking you out with their snapshots from the ruralburban coming-of-age abyss. These songs are so catchy you almost don't notice the body count." Jeremy Winograd praised the album in the review for Slant: "All of the wobbling between tempos and styles might sound haphazard, but it's executed with precision. And Hartzman's snatches of Americana imagery—rain-rotted houses, parking lots, "piss-colored bright yellow Fanta"—ultimately cohere into an evocative portrait of the fringes of American life."

=== Year-end lists ===
Select year-end rankings of Rat Saw God
| Critic/Publication | List | Rank | Ref. |
|---|---|---|---|
| Consequence | The 50 Best Albums of 2023 | 2 | |
| Exclaim! | Exclaim!'s 50 Best Albums of 2023 | 6 | |
| The Line of Best Fit | The Best Albums of 2023 | 2 | |
| Paste | The 50 Best Albums of 2023 | 1 | |
| Pitchfork | The 50 Best Albums of 2023 | 4 | |
| Rolling Stone | The 100 Best Albums of 2023 | 27 | |
| Stereogum | The 50 Best Albums of 2023 | 1 | |

== Track listing ==
All tracks are written by Karly Hartzman, Margo Schultz, Mark Jacob Lenderman, Richard Miller, and Alexander Reuben.

Rat Saw God track listing
| No. | Title | Length |
|---|---|---|
| 1. | "Hot Rotten Grass Smell" | 1:35 |
| 2. | "Bull Believer" | 8:30 |
| 3. | "Got Shocked" | 2:18 |
| 4. | "Formula One" | 2:52 |
| 5. | "Chosen to Deserve" | 5:32 |
| 6. | "Bath County" | 3:10 |
| 7. | "Quarry" | 4:07 |
| 8. | "Turkey Vultures" | 4:05 |
| 9. | "What's So Funny" | 2:32 |
| 10. | "TV in the Gas Pump" | 2:22 |
| Total length: | | 37:03 |

== Personnel ==
Credits adapted from the album's liner notes.

=== Wednesday ===
- Karly Hartzman – guitar, vocals
- MJ Lenderman – guitar, backing vocals
- Xandy Chelmis – lap steel
- Margo Schultz – bass, painting
- Alan Miller – drums

=== Additional contributors ===
- Alex Farrar – production, mixing, engineering
- Huntley Miller – mastering
- Charlie Boss – photography
