= Manning Fireworks =

Studio album by MJ Lenderman
- Released: September 6, 2024
- Studio: Drop of Sun (Asheville, North Carolina)
- Genres: Alternative country; slacker rock; country rock
- Length: 38:51
- Labels: Anti-; Epitaph
- Producers: MJ Lenderman; Alex Farrar

MJ Lenderman chronology
And the Wind (Live and Loose!) (2023)	Manning Fireworks (2024)

Singles from Manning Fireworks
- 1. "She's Leaving You" Released: June 24, 2024; 2. "Joker Lips" Released: July 29, 2024; 3. "Wristwatch" Released: September 4, 2024

Manning Fireworks is the fourth solo album by American musician MJ Lenderman. The album was released on September 6, 2024, through Anti- and Epitaph Records. Produced by Lenderman and Alex Farrar, the album features contributions from Lenderman's Wednesday bandmates Karly Hartzman, Xandy Chelmis and Ethan Baechtold.

== Background ==
Manning Fireworks was announced on June 24, 2024, accompanied by the single release of "She's Leaving You". Lenderman recorded the album at Drop of Sun Studios in his home town of Asheville, North Carolina. A press release refers to the record as an insight into Lenderman's "frank observations on the intersection of wit and sadness" that transfers "punchlines" and "rusted-wire guitar solos" from previous works and presents a "new sincerity" and perspective through "his warped lens".

== Critical reception ==
Professional ratings
Aggregate scores
Source	Rating
AnyDecentMusic?	8.2/10
Metacritic	88/100
Review scores
Source	Rating
AllMusic	4/5 stars
The Guardian	4/5 stars
Mojo	4/5 stars
MusicOMH	4.5/5 stars
NME	4/5 stars
Pitchfork	8.7/10
Rolling Stone	4/5 stars
Slant Magazine	4/5 stars
The Skinny	4/5 stars
Uncut	9/10

According to the review aggregator Metacritic, Manning Fireworks received "universal acclaim" based on a weighted average score of 88 out of 100 from 22 critic scores.

In a review for AllMusic, Mark Deming declared that, "coupled with his scrappy guitar and the satisfyingly loose report of his band, [Lenderman] makes it all into something often moving and always compelling." Pitchfork awarded the record its Best New Music designation, with Jeremy D. Larson describing the record "witty and sincere, the mark of a songwriter finding his voice." Rolling Stone's Jon Dolan called it an "indie-rock gem" with "ace" storytelling. Steven Hyden in Uproxx was effusive, depicting it as an "especially precious commodity" in the modern age. Damien Morris at the Guardian interpreted it as a "joyously weird" LP steeped in religion, while PopMatters' Patrick Gill praised its witty lyricism and "exceptional" sonic sensibilities.

In an interview with NME, writer Jordan Bassett opined that the album "often amounts to a study in thwarted masculinity" and the expression of Lenderman's "hate-watch" of "macho influencers". A premature evaluation conducted by Stereogum writer Danielle Chelosky already called Manning Fireworks "one of the best albums of the year" and the fall equivalent of Brat by Charli XCX. Jeremy Winograd of Slant Magazine thought Manning Fireworks was "something of a solitary affair", praising the "vitality and enthusiasm" that comes through in his guitar work. Winograd concluded that if the album is the product of "all those nights playing Guitar Hero" then there's hoping that "Lenderman never leaves his room". John Amen of Beats Per Minute was slightly more ambivalent, writing, "While the mixes on Manning Fireworks are studiously crafted, Lenderman’s presence largely enrolling, and his guitar acumen undeniable, the set’s overall gestalt is naggingly emulative. Lenderman, as compelling as he can be, rarely transcends the influence of his forebears."

=== Year-end lists ===
Manning Fireworks was featured by many music and culture publications as one of the best albums of 2024. The New Yorker named the album as the best of the year, while Brooklyn Vegan, The Line of Best Fit, and Stereogum placed it second. The record was ranked in the top ten albums of 2024 by Rolling Stone, Uncut, Clash, Paste, Associated Press, Vulture, Pitchfork, The Fader, Impose, and Entertainment Weekly. Gorilla vs. Bear, The A.V. Club, Exclaim!, Loud and Quiet, The Guardian, NME, The Ringer, The Skinny, Consequence, and Slant Magazine ranked it in their top 20, with Crack, AllMusic, NPR, Uproxx, Vogue, and Billboard also including it in a list of the best albums of the year.

Select year-end rankings for Manning Fireworks
Publication/critic	Accolade	Rank	Ref.
The A.V. Club	25 Best Albums of 2024	12	
Consequence	50 Best Albums of 2024	18	
Entertainment Weekly	10 Best Albums of 2024	7	
Exclaim!	50 Best Albums of 2024	11	
The New Yorker	(20) Best Albums of 2024	1	
NME	50 Best Albums of 2024	14	
Paste	100 Best Albums of 2024	7	
Pitchfork	50 Best Albums of 2024	4	
Rolling Stone	100 Best Albums of 2024	3	
Rough Trade UK	(100) Albums of the Year 2024	24	
Slant	50 Best Albums of 2024	14	
Stereogum	50 Best Albums of 2024	2	
Uncut	80 Best Albums of 2024	8	

== Track listing ==
All tracks are written by MJ Lenderman.

Manning Fireworks track listing
No.	Title	Length
1.	"Manning Fireworks"	2:59
2.	"Joker Lips"	3:01
3.	"Rudolph"	3:31
4.	"Wristwatch"	3:42
5.	"She's Leaving You"	4:38
6.	"Rip Torn"	3:32
7.	"You Don't Know the Shape I'm In"	3:36
8.	"On My Knees"	3:52
9.	"Bark at the Moon"	10:00
Total length:		38:51

== Personnel ==
- MJ Lenderman – vocals, bass guitar, drums, guitar, organ, production
- Karly Hartzman – vocals (tracks 1, 4–7, 9)
- Landon George – bass guitar (tracks 1, 6, 7), fiddle (1, 6), trombone (1, 9)
- Xandy Chelmis – pedal steel guitar (tracks 3, 4), background vocals (3)
- Ethan Baechtold – piano (track 6)
- Shane McCord – clarinet (tracks 7, 9)
- Colin Miller – slide guitar (track 7)
- Adam McDaniel – bass clarinet (track 9)
- Alex Farrar – production, mixing, engineering (all tracks); Mellotron (track 2), piano (4, 5), drums (7)
- Lawson Anderson – assistant engineering (track 7)
- Greg Obis – mastering
- Matthew Reed – cover art
- Andrew James – cover art

== Charts ==
Chart performance for Manning Fireworks
Chart (2024)	Peak position
Belgian Albums (Ultratop Flanders)	177
Scottish Albums (Official Charts)	19
UK Albums (Official Charts)	85
UK Album Downloads (Official Charts)	29
UK Americana Albums (Official Charts)	6
UK Country Albums (Official Charts)	2
UK Independent Albums (Official Charts)	9
US Folk Albums (Billboard)	15
US Independent Albums (Billboard)	48
