= Ghost of Your Guitar Solo =

Second studio album by MJ Lenderman

Studio album by MJ Lenderman
- Released: March 26, 2021
- Genres: Indie rock; lo-fi rock; slacker rock
- Length: 25:12
- Label: Dear Life Records
- Producer: MJ Lenderman

MJ Lenderman chronology
MJ Lenderman (2019)	Ghost of Your Guitar Solo (2021)	Boat Songs (2022)

Ghost of Your Guitar Solo is the second solo album by American musician MJ Lenderman. The album was released on March 26, 2021, through Dear Life records. The album received positive reviews from critics.

== Background ==
Lenderman's lyrics came through a series of daily writing exercises. Much of the album came through jam-sessions with Lenderman's roommates, whose melodies and freestyled lyrics were later polished by Lenderman.

== Release ==
The album was released on digital platforms on March 26, 2021.The album cover was designed by Jon Samuels. It was later released on both vinyl and CD in May 2023. Music videos were released for "Gentleman's Jack", "I Ate Too Much At The Fair", and "Someone Get The Grill Out of the Rain". Although the album received limited attention upon release, it received newfound evaluation following the release of Lenderman's live album And the Wind (Live and Loose!), which features new versions of several songs from the album.

== Critical reception ==
In a positive review for undrcurrents.com, David Wilikofsky praised the album's lyricism and its "relaxed, off the cuff" production, and compared the album to David Berman's Purple Mountains. Another reviewer noted that despite the brevity of many tracks, Lenderman was able to convery "simple yet significant statements of regret through blown-out lo-fi wattage". The wide-ranging genres covered on the album drew comparisons to both Harry Crews and Larry Brown.

== Track listing ==
All tracks are written by MJ Lenderman.

No.	Title	Length
1.	"Ghost of Your Guitar Solo"	4:45
2.	"I Ate Too Much At The Fair"	1:54
3.	"Someone Get the Grill Out of the Rain"	1:13
4.	"Inappropriate"	1:13
5.	"Gentleman's Jack"	2:31
6.	"Another Place"	2:26
7.	"Infinity Pool"	2:45
8.	"Ghost of Your Guitar Solo 2"	2:03
9.	"Catholic Priest"	3:30
10.	"Live Jack"	2:52

== Personnel ==
All songs were written and performed by MJ Lenderman. The album was mastered by Colin Miller, who played drums, alongside guitarist Lewis Dahm, on the track "Live Jack".
