= Colin Miller (musician) =

American indie rock musician

Colin Miller is an American indie rock musician from Asheville, North Carolina. Miller is both a solo artist and a member of MJ Lenderman's band.

== History ==
Miller began his solo career uploading songs to Bandcamp, as well as releasing two EPs, My Love in the Winter and Hook. He also produced and engineered albums for numerous Asheville based bands, such as MJ Lenderman, Indigo De Souza and Wednesday. Miller released his debut full-length record, Haw Creek, in 2023. Miller began working on his second studio album after the death of his landlord Gary King. The album was announced in February 2025 and released in April of that year. The album features Lenderman as well as other members of the band Wednesday. The album was produced by Alex Farrar. The album received positive reviews.

== Discography ==
Studio albums

- Haw Creek (2023)
- Losin' (2025)

EPs

- My Love in the Winter (2020)
- Hook (2021)
