= I Was Trying to Describe You to Someone =

I Was Trying to Describe You to Someone may refer to:

- "I Was Trying to Describe You to Someone", a short literary work by Richard Brautigan published in his 1971 collection Revenge of the Lawn
- I Was Trying to Describe You to Someone (Crime in Stereo album), 2010
- I Was Trying to Describe You to Someone (Wednesday album), 2020
