= Precipice (disambiguation) =

A precipice is a significant vertical rock exposure.

Precipice may also refer to:

- "Precipice" (Battlestar Galactica), the second episode of the third season of Battlestar Galactica
- "Precipice" (Smallville), the nineteenth episode of the second season of Smallville
- Precipice National Park, a national park in Queensland, Australia
- Precipice (album), a 2025 album by singer-songwriter Indigo De Souza
- Precipice (video game), a 2009 video game
- The Precipice (Goncharov novel), an 1869 novel by Ivan Goncharov
- The Precipice (MacLennan novel), a 1948 novel by Hugh MacLennan
- The Precipice: Existential Risk and the Future of Humanity, a 2020 non-fiction book by Toby Ord
- The Precipice (Bova novel), a 2001 science fiction novel by Ben Bova
