= Thomas Dollbaum =

American musician

- Born: Tampa, Florida, U.S.
- Genres: Alt-country; country rock
- Instruments: Vocals; guitar
- Years active: 2022–Present
- Label: Dear Life Records
- Website: www.dearliferecs.com/thomas-dollbaum

Thomas Dollbaum is an American singer-songwriter and poet. His musical style has been described as alternative country and "countryish indie." His debut album Wellswood released in 2022, followed by Birds of Paradise in 2026.

== Biography ==
=== Early life and education ===
Dollbaum was born and raised in Tampa, Florida. In his youth, he was introduced to live music through friends who played in the local punk scene. At thirteen, he started a local reggae band, though he was a fan of artists like Bob Dylan, John Prine, and Damien Jurado. After graduating high school, Dollbaum attended the University of New Orleans, graduating with an MFA in poetry.

=== Career ===
In New Orleans, Dollbaum began to play shows in local venues, and eventually wrote and recorded his debut album Wellswood, released by Big Legal Mess in 2022. After playing a show in Asheville, North Carolina, Dollbaum met MJ Lenderman, and Lenderman invited Dollbaum to perform at the release show for Lenderman's album Boat Songs. In 2023, Dollbaum asked Lenderman to play drums on Dollbaum's next album. After recording some material, Lenderman suggested harmonies to Dollbaum, and went on to sing backup vocals for the songs "Coyote," "Pulverize," and "Waterbirds."

Though Dollbaum recorded the material for the album in 2023, a falling out with Big Legal Mess kept the album from releasing for several years. In 2025, Dollbaum recorded and released the EP Drive All Night, then reached an agreement with Dear Life Records (who put out Lenderman's album Boat Songs) to release Birds of Paradise in 2026. The album was released on May 22, 2026. Writing for Pitchfork, Sam Sodomsky gave Birds of Paradise a 7.8 out of 10, favorably describing Dollbaum's vivid storytelling and the record's combination of "rootsy, heartland rock" with a "driving, electric sound."

== Personal life ==
Dollbaum owns and operates a carpentry business in New Orleans.
