= Bleeds (Wednesday album) =

Studio album by Wednesday
- Released: September 19, 2025
- Studio: Drop of Sun (Asheville, North Carolina)
- Length: 36:44
- Label: Dead Oceans
- Producer: Alex Farrar

Wednesday chronology
| Rat Saw God (2023) | Bleeds (2025) |

Singles from Bleeds
- 1. "Elderberry Wine" Released: May 21, 2025; 2. "Wound Up Here (By Holdin On)" Released: June 18, 2025; 3. "Pick Up That Knife" Released: July 24, 2025; 4. "Bitter Everyday" Released: August 19, 2025

Bleeds is the sixth studio album by American rock band Wednesday, released on September 19, 2025, on Dead Oceans. Produced by Alex Farrar, who had worked with the band on their previous studio albums, Twin Plagues (2021) and Rat Saw God (2023), the album was preceded by the singles, "Elderberry Wine", "Wound Up Here (By Holdin On)", "Pick Up That Knife" and "Bitter Everyday".

It is the band's first album to feature bass guitarist Ethan Baechtold, who joined the band in 2023 ahead of touring in support of Rat Saw God. Prior to the album's release, lead guitarist MJ Lenderman announced that he would no longer be touring with Wednesday, but would remain a full contributing member of the band in a studio context. He was replaced by guitarist Jake "Spyder" Pugh on Bleeds' accompanying tour.

== Background and themes ==
Frontwoman Karly Hartzman described Bleeds as the "spiritual successor to Rat Saw God" and said it represents what the band was "supposed to sound like" after spending a great deal of time trying to figure that out. According to her, the album is the quintessential "Wednesday Creek Rock" record. Originally, Hartzman wanted to title the album Carolina Girl, but her bandmates were unsatisfied with the name. The final title, Bleeds, comes from the song "Reality TV Argument Bleeds", which Hartzman felt paired well with the band's name ("Wednesday Bleeds"). The album showcases a "cohesion across a variance of sound", drawing partly from the band's earlier themes. Hartzman acknowledges that, in a way, she's "writing the same songs over and over", but with the intention of refining and improving them in the process.

Most songs on the album were written before Hartzman and bandmate MJ Lenderman ended their romantic relationship after six years in 2024. However, several lyrics already hint at the strain in their bond. While themes of loss and violence influence the album, Hartzman does not view it as a "dark record". Instead, she embraces a more realistic perspective, describing it as having a "southern gothic attitude", a sound that's "a little bit scary, but with a heart of gold underneath".

== Promotion ==
The band announced the album on June 18, 2025, coinciding with the release of the second single, "Wound Up Here (By Holdin On)", and its accompanying music video directed by Joriel Cura. Recorded at Drop of Sun in Asheville, North Carolina with longtime producer Alex Farrar, the album features twelve tracks, including the previously released single "Elderberry Wine", which arrived on May 21, 2025. To support the album, the band will embark on a U.S. tour in October and November 2025. Support acts include indie rock band Friendship and Daffo. Guitarist MJ Lenderman will no longer join the band on tour but continues to collaborate with them on music.

== Critical reception ==
Professional ratings
Aggregate scores
| Source | Rating |
|---|---|
| AnyDecentMusic? | 8.4/10 |
| Metacritic | 88/100 |
Review scores
| Source | Rating |
| AllMusic | 3.5/5 stars |
| The Line of Best Fit | 8/10 |
| Mojo | 4/5 stars |
| NME | 5/5 stars |
| Pitchfork | 8.7/10 |
| PopMatters | 9/10 |
| Record Collector | 4/5 stars |
| The Skinny | 4/5 stars |
| Slant Magazine | 4/5 stars |
| Uncut | 9/10 |

According to the review aggregator Metacritic, Bleeds received "universal acclaim" based on a weighted average score of 88 out of 100 from 20 critic scores. It placed at No.2 in The Alternative's 50 Best Albums of 2025.

== Track listing ==
All tracks are written by Karly Hartzman, Ethan Baechtold, Alexander Chelmis, Mark Jacob Lenderman, and Richard Alan Miller; except "The Way Love Goes" written by Hartzman, Baechtold, Chelmis, Lenderman, Miller, Lefty Frizzell and Sanger D. Shafer.

Bleeds track listing
| No. | Title | Length |
|---|---|---|
| 1. | "Reality TV Argument Bleeds" | 3:02 |
| 2. | "Townies" | 3:15 |
| 3. | "Wound Up Here (By Holdin On)" | 3:28 |
| 4. | "Elderberry Wine" | 3:35 |
| 5. | "Phish Pepsi" | 2:29 |
| 6. | "Candy Breath" | 2:52 |
| 7. | "The Way Love Goes" | 1:56 |
| 8. | "Pick Up That Knife" | 4:21 |
| 9. | "Wasp" | 1:26 |
| 10. | "Bitter Everyday" | 3:21 |
| 11. | "Carolina Murder Suicide" | 4:24 |
| 12. | "Gary's II" | 2:35 |
| Total length: | | 36:44 |

== Personnel ==
Credits adapted from the album's liner notes.

=== Wednesday ===
- Karly Hartzman – lead vocals, guitar
- Jake Lenderman – guitar, vocals
- Xandy Chelmis – lap steel, pedal steel
- Ethan Baechtold – bass guitar, piano
- Alan Miller – drums

=== Additional contributors ===
- Alex Farrar – production, mixing, engineering
- Huntley Miller – mastering
- Miles Johnson – art direction

== Charts ==
Chart performance for Bleeds
| Chart (2025) | Peak position |
|---|---|
| French Rock & Metal Albums (SNEP) | 47 |
| Scottish Albums (Official Charts) | 14 |
| UK Albums Sales (OCC) | 17 |
| UK Americana Albums (Official Charts) | 3 |
| UK Independent Albums (Official Charts) | 5 |
| US Independent Albums (Billboard) | 46 |
| US Top Album Sales (Billboard) | 22 |
