= She's Leaving You =

Single by MJ Lenderman

from the album Manning Fireworks
- Released: June 24, 2024
- Studio: Drop of Sun Studios (Asheville, North Carolina)
- Genre: Indie rock
- Length: 4:38
- Label: Anti-
- Songwriter: MJ Lenderman
- Producers: MJ Lenderman; Alex Farrar

MJ Lenderman singles chronology
"Knockin'" (2023)	"She's Leaving You" (2024)	"Joker Lips" (2024)

"She's Leaving You" is a song recorded by the American singer-songwriter MJ Lenderman. The song was released on June 24, 2024, through Anti-, as the lead single from his fourth studio album, Manning Fireworks. The song is a tragicomic anthem of a lousy middle-aged man exposed in deceit after a bender in Vegas. The song features a rollicking guitar solo and backing vocals from his Wednesday bandmate Karly Hartzman. Lenderman co-produced the song with his partner Alex Farrar, and plays nearly all instruments on the track.

Critics widely praised the song, with many considering it a highlight of Manning Fireworks and one of Lenderman's best songs.

== Background ==
"She's Leaving You" depicts a hapless loser in middle-age unmasked in infidelity. Lenderman opens the song: "You can put your clothes back on, she’s leaving you." In each chorus, he concedes "it falls apart / we all got work to do." In a press release, the song is described as a "half-sneering portrait of a middle-aged man cheating his way through a midlife crisis, at least until he gets caught and blasts Clapton in a rented Ferrari en route to Vegas." Lenderman recorded the song at Drop of Sun Studios in his hometown of Asheville, North Carolina between touring breaks, and plays nearly all instruments on the song, including guitar, drums, bass, vocals, organ, and drone. Alex Farrar, who co-produced the song, adds piano. The song also contains backing vocals from Karly Hartzman of Wednesday, who was romantically linked with Lenderman. The song was compared to the work of Neil Young.

The song's music video is set at a talent show and was directed by Clay Tatum and Whitmer Thomas. In the clip, Lenderman performs alongside cheerleaders and magicians. Critics interpreted the song as reminiscent of the video for "Smells Like Teen Spirit" and Drop Dead Gorgeous.

== Release and reception ==
Anti- released the song on June 24, 2024. The song's release was met with excitement and several viral "dudes rock" memes; one asked, in the style of an op-ed, "Is the Cure to Male Loneliness MJ Lenderman?"

"She's Leaving You" was widely lauded by contemporary music critics. The Fader called it the song of the summer, with Cady Siregar writing: "MJ Lenderman's 'She’s Leaving You' is the slacker anthem of the summer, a no-frills indie rock banger with shades of Built to Spill and Pavement that’s melancholy in tone, but with stadium-ready hooks." Lindsay Zoladz of The New York Times remarked that it "expertly blends pathos and bleak humor [...] Lenderman somehow turns this chronicle of almost achingly banal male behavior into a bona fide anthem, complete with a fist-pumping chorus and a killer guitar solo." The Guardian's Damien Morris called it "superb" and his "best song yet," while Jon Dolan from Rolling Stone called it the album's highlight. Steven Hyden in Uproxx dubbed it one of Lenderman's finest songs.

=== Year-end lists ===
Publication	Accolade	Rank	Ref.
Billboard	Staff List: The 100 Best Songs of 2024	72	
Consequence	200 Best Songs of 2024	10	
The FADER	The 50 Best Songs of 2024	8	
NME	The 50 Best Songs of 2024	15	
Rolling Stone	The 100 Best Songs of 2024	24	
Slant Magazine	The 50 Best Songs of 2024	36	
Stereogum	The 50 Best Songs of 2024	7	

== Personnel ==
- MJ Lenderman - guitar, drums, bass, vocals, organ, drone
- Karly Hartzman - vocals
- Alex Farrar - piano

== Charts ==
Weekly chart performance for "She's Leaving You"
Chart (2024)	Peak position
US Rock Airplay (Billboard)	45
