= I Love My Mom =

Studio album by Indigo De Souza
- Released: June 8, 2018
- Genre: Garage pop; grunge; indie rock
- Length: 34:46
- Label: Self-released (2018); Saddle Creek (2021)
- Producer: Indigo De Souza; Owen Stone; Jake Lenderman

Indigo De Souza chronology
| Don't Cry Just Do (2017) | I Love My Mom (2018) | Any Shape You Take (2021) |

I Love My Mom is the debut record by North Carolina–based musician Indigo De Souza. It was self-released in June 2018 but was given a full re-release by Saddle Creek Records in June 2021.

== Composition ==
The "playful, spunky, and unpredictable" songs on Mom have been seen as "folksy" garage pop, "steady" grunge and indie rock.

== Critical reception ==
Professional ratings
Review scores
| Source | Rating |
|---|---|
| AllMusic | 3.5/5 stars |
| Pitchfork | 7.2/10 |

Abby Jones for Pitchfork called the album "imperfect, unabashed, and endearing", while Marcy Donelson for AllMusic called it "an especially candid and personal set" where "De Souza solidly find[s] her footing."

== Track listing ==
All tracks are written by Indigo De Souza, except where noted

| No. | Title | Writer(s) | Length |
|---|---|---|---|
| 1. | "How I Get Myself Killed" | | 3:16 |
| 2. | "Take Off Ur Pants" | De Souza; Owen Stone; Jake Lenderman | 3:40 |
| 3. | "Good Heart" | | 2:40 |
| 4. | "Smoke" | | 3:13 |
| 5. | "Sick in the Head" | | 3:29 |
| 6. | "What Are We Gonna Do Now" | | 3:24 |
| 7. | "Home Team" | De Souza; Emily Constantino | 3:23 |
| 8. | "Ghost" | | 4:11 |
| 9. | "The Sun is Bad" | | 2:38 |
| 10. | "I Had to Get Out" | | 4:51 |
| Total length: | | | 34:46 |

== Personnel ==
Adapted from the record's Bandcamp page.

Indigo De Souza

- Indigo De Souza – lead vocals, guitar, keys
- Owen Stone – bass, guitar, keys
- Jake Lenderman – drums, guitar

Technical

- Indigo De Souza – production
- Owen Stone – production
- Jake Landerman – production
- Colin Miller – recording, mixing, mastering

Artwork and design

- Kimberly Oberhammer – cover artwork
