= Primavera Sound 2023 =

Music festival in Barcelona, Spain

- Genre: Pop; alternative rock; indie; electronic; dance; hip hop; reggaeton
- Dates: 1 June 2023 – 3 June 2023
- Locations: Barcelona (Catalonia, Spain)
- Coordinates: 41°24′40.75″N 2°13′28.57″E
- Founders: Pablo Soler
- Previous event: Primavera Sound 2022
- Next event: Primavera Sound 2024
- Attendance: 253,000
- Website: primaverasound.com

The Primavera Sound 2023 music festival was held between 1 and 3 June at the Parc del Fòrum, in Barcelona, Spain. The festival's line-up was headlined by Blur, Calvin Harris, Depeche Mode, Halsey, Kendrick Lamar, New Order and Rosalía.

After the two-weekend format introduced the previous year, the festival went back to the usual three-day format in the city, but held a parallel festival in Madrid with a nearly identical lineup a week later under the tagline "I'll Be Your Mirror".

The 21st edition of the festival, performances were also live-streamed on Amazon Music's Twitch channel, which was available to watch through Amazon Prime Video as well. In addition to the main festival, there was also a free "welcome day" concert at the Parc del Fòrum headlined by Pet Shop Boys, with RSVP tickets offered to both festivalgoers and Barcelona city residents. There was also a closing "Brunch on the Beach" party held at the Parc del Fòrum on 4 June, featuring electronic music performances from DJs including Diplo and Purple Disco Machine. Under Primavera a la Ciutat (English: "Primavera in the City"), the festival held shows throughout various different concert venues and clubs in downtown Barcelona in the days surrounding the main festival, featuring exclusive appearances from the likes of Black Midi, Molchat Doma, Cloud Nothings and The Chills.

== Background ==
Depeche Mode was announced as the first headliner of the festival on 4 October 2022. The full festival lineup was announced on 29 November 2022. Billed as "I'll Be Your Mirror", the festival was set to be held in two cities, Barcelona and Madrid during the two weekends. On 7 March, New Order was announced as the final festival headliner.

On 26 April, it was announced that the festival was livestreamed on Twitch via Amazon Music's channel and Amazon Prime Video.

During the festival's free opening night on 31 May, a 57-year old Scottish man was killed by a tram outside Parc del Fòrum after the Pet Shop Boys' performance.

Blur performed their UK number-one single "Country House" for the first time since 2015 and the B-side "Luminous" for the first time since 1999.

On Friday 2 June, headliner Kendrick Lamar performed his verses from Pusha T's "Nosetalgia" and The Weeknd's "Sidewalks" live for the first time. Later, Skrillex's set was disrupted because the stage caught fire as he performed.

Rosalía, a Barcelona native, reportedly drew the largest crowd gathering of the festival when she headlined on Saturday.

On Saturday 3 June, the Ron Brugal stage suffered from sound problems. Kelela's set was halted for 10 minutes and ultimately cut short as her microphone suddenly cut out. The delay resulted in Måneskin's set on the neighboring Amazon Music stage also running past its scheduled end time. As a result, Death Grips could not take the Ron Brugal stage on time, and Death Grips fans began to boo Måneskin for continuing to perform overtime and delaying the Death Grips set.

Prior to performing their final song "Bull Believer" on Saturday, Wednesday lead singer Karly Hartzman criticised Jeff Bezos and Amazon while performing on the Amazon Music stage, dedicating the song to "any warehouse workers who have ever been mistreated."

Ticket preferences shifted with the previous ratio of 90% full festival tickets to 10% day tickets reversing in both editions. This change in trend was linked to the rising prices of tickets, flights, and accommodation. Barcelona experienced a decrease in foreign attendees from 70% to 52%, mainly among British visitors, which was attributed to the impact of Brexit and increased costs.

=== Madrid ===
This year was the inaugural edition held in Madrid exactly a week after Barcelona with nearly identical lineups. The grounds were held at the Ciudad del Rock, outside Madrid's Arganda del Rey municipality. However, the festival was cancelled entirely on Thursday as a result of weather concerns, which was announced a day prior. Blur performed a makeup show at the La Riviera club (capacity: 2,000), while Yard Act and Off! organized a show at the Wurlitzer Ballroom.

The festival faced a mobility challenge, especially on June 9, when traffic jams at the entrances led to a 45-minute delay in Depeche Mode's concert. Limited parking, half of which was unusable due to prior rains, contributed to these issues. There were rumors of widespread distribution of gifted tickets to meet the target of 50,000 daily attendees, though organizers denied any unusual practices without disclosing exact numbers.

Death Grips pulled out of their Saturday set at the last minute, citing an illness.

The organizers noted that 38% of the attendees came from foreign countries, and in Madrid, there was a higher representation of Latin American attendees compared to Barcelona, which they attributed to Madrid being a more accessible and direct destination.

On 22 July 2023, Primavera Sound announced that it would not be returning to Madrid in 2024, stating: "the expectations we had were not fulfilled and the experience of the festivalgoers due to several logistical aspects was not the desired one. Inside the Ciudad del Rock, we experienced a festival full of great musical moments, but we are not oblivious to the annoyances. And that leads us to understand that, now, the conditions are not right for Madrid to have a Primavera Sound as it deserves in 2024."

== Headline set lists ==
Thursday, 1 June

Blur
1. "St Charles Square"
2. "There's No Other Way"
3. "Popscene"
4. "Tracy Jacks"
5. "Beetlebum"
6. "Trimm Trabb"
7. "Villa Rosie"
8. "Coffee & TV"
9. "Luminous"
10. "End of a Century"
11. "Country House"
12. "Parklife"
13. "To the End"
14. "Girls & Boys"
15. "Song 2"
16. "Intermission"
17. "This Is a Low"
18. "Tender"
19. "The Narcissist"
20. "The Universal"
Halsey
1. "Nightmare"
2. "Castle"
3. "Easier than Lying"
4. "You Should Be Sad"
5. "Graveyard"
6. "Colors"
7. "Eastside"
8. "The Lighthouse"
9. "Honey"
10. "Bad at Love"
11. "3AM"
12. "Closer"
13. "Gasoline"
14. "Experiment on Me"
15. "Without Me"
16. "I Am Not a Woman, I'm a God"
New Order
1. "Regret"
2. "Age of Consent"
3. "Academic"
4. "Your Silent Face"
5. "Be A Rebel"
6. "Sub-culture"
7. "Bizarre Love Triangle"
8. "Plastic"
9. "True Faith"
10. "Blue Monday"
11. "Temptation"
12. "Love Will Tear Us Apart"

Friday, 2 June

Depeche Mode
1. "My Cosmos Is Mine"
2. "Wagging Tongue"
3. "Walking in My Shoes"
4. "It's No Good"
5. "In Your Room" (Zephyr Mix)
6. "Everything Counts"
7. "Precious"
8. "Home"
9. "Ghosts Again"
10. "I Feel You"
11. "A Pain That I'm Used To" (Jacques Lu Cont Remix)
12. "World in My Eyes"
13. "Stripped"
14. "John the Revelator"
15. "Enjoy the Silence"

Encore

16. "Just Can't Get Enough"
17. "Never Let Me Down Again"
18. "Personal Jesus"
Kendrick Lamar
1. "N95"
2. "Element"
3. "A.D.H.D"
4. "King Kunta"
5. "Worldwide Steppers"
6. "Nosetalgia"
7. "Backseat Freestyle"
8. "M.A.A.D City"
9. "Swimming Pools (Drank)"
10. "Loyalty"
11. "Purple Hearts"
12. "DNA"
13. "Rich Spirit"
14. "Humble"
15. "Sidewalks"
16. "Count Me Out"
17. "Money Trees"
18. "Bitch, Don't Kill My Vibe"
19. "Die Hard"
20. "Love"
21. "Alright"
22. "Vent" (with Baby Keem)
23. "Family Ties" (with Baby Keem)
24. "Savior"

Saturday, 3 June

Rosalía
1. "Saoko"
2. "Bizcochito"
3. "La Fama"
4. "De aquí no sales"/"Bulerías"
5. "La Noche de Anoche"
6. "Linda"
7. "Diablo"
8. "Despechá"
9. "Hentai"
10. "Candy"
11. "Motomami"
12. "La Combi Versace"
13. "Con altura"
14. "Beso"
15. "Vampiros"
16. "Héroe"
17. "Malamente"
18. "Chicken Teriyaki"
19. "CUUUUuuuuuute"

== Line-up ==
Headline performers are listed in boldface. Artists listed from latest to earliest set times.

=== Estrella Damm ===
Thursday, 1 June 2023	Friday, 2 June 2023	Saturday, 3 June 2023
**Blur**; **New Order**; Turnstile; Black Country, New Road	Skrillex; **Kendrick Lamar**; Baby Keem; Los Hacheros	**Rosalía**; Caroline Polachek; Sevdaliza; Grupo de Expertos Solynieve

=== Santander ===
Thursday, 1 June 2023	Friday, 2 June 2023	Saturday, 3 June 2023
**Halsey**; NxWorries; Alex G	Fred again..; **Depeche Mode**; Japanese Breakfast	**Calvin Harris**; St. Vincent; Arlo Parks

=== Amazon Music ===
Thursday, 1 June 2023	Friday, 2 June 2023	Saturday, 3 June 2023
Darkside; Alison Goldfrapp; Rema; Ghost; Joe Crepúsculo; Antònim	Mora; Christine and the Queens; Four Tet; Sparks; Julia Jacklin; Carlota Flâneur	Charlotte de Witte; Måneskin; The War on Drugs; My Morning Jacket; Wednesday; Desert

=== Cupra ===
Thursday, 1 June 2023	Friday, 2 June 2023	Saturday, 3 June 2023
Folamour (A/V); Loyle Carner; Perfume; Pusha T; flowerovlove; Júlia Colom	VTSS B2B LSDXOXO; Yves Tumor; Bad Religion; The Moldy Peaches; The Delgados; Bala	DJ Coco; Two Shell; Nia Archives; Maggie Rogers; Holly Humberstone; Twin

=== Plenitude ===
Thursday, 1 June 2023	Friday, 2 June 2023	Saturday, 3 June 2023
Hudson Mohawke; Drain Gang; Self Esteem; PinkPantheress; Sudan Archives; Terno Rei; Cabiria	TSHA (Live); Unwound; Goat Girl; Alvvays; Gabriels; Soul Glo; Niña Coyote eta Chico Tornado	Overmono; DJ Playero; Liturgy; Tokischa; Be Your Own Pet; Judeline; Alissic

=== Ron Brugal ===
Thursday, 1 June 2023	Friday, 2 June 2023	Saturday, 3 June 2023
The Comet Is Coming; Le Tigre; Central Cee; Red Velvet; Yard Act; Heather	Channel Tres; Trueno; The Wedding Present; Avalon Emerson & the Charm; Cavetown	JPEGMafia; Death Grips; Kelela; The Voidz; Surf Curse; DOMi & JD BECK

=== Auditori Santander ===
Thursday, 1 June 2023	Friday, 2 June 2023	Saturday, 3 June 2023
Boris; Come; Emeralds	Swans; Julia Holter; Beth Orton; Israel Fernández y Diego del Morao	Laurie Anderson; John Cale; James Ellis Ford; Núria Graham

=== Dice ===
Thursday, 1 June 2023	Friday, 2 June 2023	Saturday, 3 June 2023
Ascendant Vierge; Machine Girl; Amenra; Off!; Built to Spill; joe unknown	Lebanon Hanover; Kyary Pamyu Pamyu; Nation of Language; Karate; Shellac; The Beths	Los Ganglios; Gilla Band; Jockstrap; Gaz Coombes; Villano Antillano; Bar Italia

=== Pull&Bear ===
Thursday, 1 June 2023	Friday, 2 June 2023	Saturday, 3 June 2023
Brutalismus 3000; Chica Gang; Karenn; Juliana Huxtable B2B Jasss; Rhyw (Live); Verraco	Daphni; John Talabot; The Soft Pink Truth (Live); Voices from the Lake; Gigi FM; Nazira; Maddy Maia B2B Tottie; Velmondo	Jayda G; Pional; Josey Rebelle; DJ Storm; Anish Kumar; Wooden Wisdom + DJ Fitz

=== Stone Island Sound at the Warehouse ===
Thursday, 1 June 2023	Friday, 2 June 2023	Saturday, 3 June 2023
Jana Rush; Abadir & Hogir (Live); Blackhaine; Slauson Malone; Heinali; Salamanda	Bill Kouligas; Upsammy; Tzusing; Low Jack x Lala &Ce (Live); Honour; Tongue in the Mind	CCL; Mala; Om Unit (Live); The Drift Institute; Oriana B2B Melina Serser; Ubaldo

=== Night Pro ===
Thursday, 1 June 2023	Friday, 2 June 2023	Saturday, 3 June 2023
RIP; Elmalamía; European Vampire; Vale Castillo; Guatemala; Dagger Moth	Chunyan; Farze; Atzur; Lilium; Rubber Band; Ibiza Pareo	Dirtytwo; Monikaze; Prins; Proteins of Magic; Dem Mob; Cruz Caiman

=== Boiler Room × Cupra ===
Thursday, 1 June 2023	Friday, 2 June 2023	Saturday, 3 June 2023
Tra Tra Trax Sound Sistema; Avalon Emerson; S-Candalo; OK Williams; Kikelomo; Mellow & Sleazy; European305; Iration Steppas; Nplgnn (Live)	Musa XXL x Toro; Mura Masa (DJ set); CCL; Crystallmess; DJ Babatr; Vhoor; Jon K; Yves Tumor (DJ set); Ikram Bouloum	La Creole; Drazzit; LustSickPuppy; Physical Therapy; Akanbi; DJSport; Jehia

=== Aperol Island of Joy ===
Thursday, 1 June 2023	Friday, 2 June 2023	Saturday, 3 June 2023
Ganges; Magia Bruta; Mira Paula; MARIALLUÏSA; Julia Amor	TMATNB; Ciutat; Selva Nua; Comic Sans; Amore	Enry-K (DJ set); Antònim; Morreo; Yudi Saint X; Galgo Lento

=== The Vision by Pull&Bear ===
Thursday, 1 June 2023	Friday, 2 June 2023	Saturday, 3 June 2023
Numero Group DJ; Dorian Concept; Blondshell; Gallus; Chaqueta de Chándal; NOIA️️	DJ Playero; Enamorados; Japanese Breakfast; Tomberlin; The Wedding Present; Casero	Unai Muguruza; L'Hereu Escampa; Del Water Gap; Soyuz; Molly Payton; Heal

=== Barcelona Sona by Estrella Damm ===
Thursday, 1 June 2023	Friday, 2 June 2023	Saturday, 3 June 2023
Miqui Puig (DJ set); Nahoomie; Santa Eulàlia; Stein B2B Formica	Tamarindo; Vonvon; Rob Maart	Tropikal Rockers; Iets Anders; Santoral Disco

== Primavera a la Ciutat line-up ==
=== La [2] Apolo ===
Monday, 29 May 2023	Tuesday, 30 May 2023	Wednesday, 31 May 2023	Sunday, 4 June 2023
Panic Shack; CUMGIRL8; Pip Blom; Saya Gray	Far Caspian; Just Mustard; La Paloma	Marc Piñol; Darkside	Klara Missyle; ElectroniCON; Maggie Rogers; Gwenno; Lila Drew

=== Razzmatazz ===
Monday, 29 May 2023	Tuesday, 30 May 2023	Sunday, 4 June 2023
Black Midi; Los Bitchos; Goat Girl; Enumclaw; Heather	Black Country, New Road; Las Robertas; PUP; Cabiria	Sama Yax; Loyle Carner; Yves Tumor; Joy Anonymous; Ciutat

=== Razzmatazz 2 ===
Monday, 29 May 2023	Tuesday, 30 May 2023	Sunday, 4 June 2023
Arab Strap; The Goa Express; MAVICA	The Comet Is Coming; Yunè Pinku; The Waeve; Blondshell	Jockstrap; Blondshell; Japanese Breakfast; The Chills; Adelaida

=== Razzmatazz 3 ===
Tuesday, 30 May 2023
- Elmalamía
- Vale Castillo

=== Sala Apolo ===
Monday, 29 May 2023	Tuesday, 30 May 2023	Sunday, 4 June 2023
L'éclair; Molchat Doma; Calibro 35; Crack Cloud	Glass Beams; Melody's Echo Chamber; Zopa; Julia Amor	Oddzero B2B Ferdiyei; Dave P; DJ Playero; Pet Shop Boys

=== Paral.lel 62 ===
Sunday, 4 June 2023
electroniCON party
- Satin Sheets x ESPRIT 空想
- FM Skyline
- Windows 96
- Neggy Gemmy
- George Clanton
- Death's Dynamic Shroud
- Unwound
- Gilla Band
- Cloud Nothings
- joe unknown
- Niña Coyote eta Chico Tornado

=== Welcome Day and Closing Party line-up ===
Amazon Music

Wednesday, 31 May 2023
- Pet Shop Boys
- Confidence Man
- Jake Bugg
- La Paloma

Night Pro

Wednesday, 31 May 2023
- Dagger Moth
- Guatemala
- Dagger Moth

Cupra

Sunday, 4 June 2023
- Diplo
- Purple Disco Machine
- CamelPhat
- Ben Böhmer
- Carlita
- Two Ex

== Reception ==
Rolling Stone praised this edition of the festival for improving logistics from the year prior, such as boosting the number of on-site essentials while reducing the overall capacity, though lamenting the loss of the electronic music-centered Bits area at Sant Adrià de Besòs. It commented on the musical diversity on the lineup, which had multiple East Asian pop acts including Red Velvet, Perfume and Kyary Pamyu Pamyu, and the Nigerian singer Rema. Pitchfork said that the festival held appeal from "casual festival-goers and full-on obsessives to outright skeptics... you could lose it on the dancefloor to pop phenomena like Rosalía, mosh by the sea to the epiphanic black metal of Liturgy, or hear a Numero Group DJ set featuring the rarest-of-rare Italo disco 7''s, and still feel like you’ve only scratched the surface." Variety said "the female performers – like St. Vincent, PinkPantheress, Caroline Polachek, Arlo Parks, Maggie Rogers, Holly Humberstone and the girl-fronted Alvvays and Wednesday – really dominated the festival’s lineup and provided some of the most spectacular, standout sets."

NME gave the festival a four-star review, stating that "a festival that entreats its punters to care about the future looks to be gradually entering a new, bright and reinvigorated era of its own."
