= All of This Will End =

Studio album by Indigo De Souza
- Released: April 28, 2023
- Genres: Indie rock; alternative rock
- Length: 32:40
- Label: Saddle Creek
- Producers: Indigo De Souza; Alex Farrar

Indigo De Souza chronology
Any Shape You Take (2021)	All of This Will End (2023)	Wholesome Evil Fantasy (2024)

All of This Will End is the third album by American singer Indigo De Souza. It was released on April 28, 2023, by Saddle Creek Records.

== Critical reception ==
Professional ratings
Aggregate scores
Source	Rating
AnyDecentMusic?	7.5/10
Metacritic	78/100
Review scores
Source	Rating
AllMusic	3.5/5 stars
NME	4/5 stars
Paste	9.0/10
Pitchfork	7.6/10
The Skinny	4/5 stars

On Metacritic, All of This Will End holds a score of 78 out of 100, indicating "generally favorable" reception, based on 13 reviews.

== Track listing ==
All tracks are written by Indigo De Souza.

1. "Time Back" – 2:11
2. "You Can Be Mean" – 2:24
3. "Losing" – 2:19
4. "Wasting Your Time" – 2:00
5. "Parking Lot" – 2:25
6. "All of This Will End" – 2:59
7. "Smog" – 3:14
8. "The Water" – 3:23
9. "Always" – 2:51
10. "Not My Body" – 4:11
11. "Younger & Dumber" – 4:39

== Personnel ==
Credits adapted from Tidal.

- Indigo De Souza – lead vocals, production (all tracks); guitar (tracks 1, 6, 8–10), keyboards (1–3, 7, 9, 10)
- Alex Farrar – keyboards, production, mixing, engineering (all tracks); guitar (2–6, 11), bass guitar (3, 4, 6), drum machine (3), percussion (3)
- Josh Bonati – mastering
- Dexter Webb – additional production (all tracks), guitar (2, 4–6, 8–11), whistle (2), keyboards (6); drum machine, percussion (8), piano (11)
- Avery Sullivan – drums (1, 2, 4–9, 11), whistle (2), percussion (5, 6, 8, 10)
- Dave Hartley – bass guitar (2, 5, 8–10)
- Zack Kardon – whistle (2), piano (8, 10), bass guitar (11)
- Alex Bradley – trumpet (5, 8)
- John James Tourville – pedal steel guitar (10, 11)
- Ryan Oslance – drums, percussion (10)
- Kimberly Oberhammer – artwork
- Emma Headley – design

== Charts ==
Chart performance for All of This Will End
Chart (2023)	Peak position
US Top Album Sales (Billboard)	66
US Top Heatseekers (Billboard)	18
