= I Was Trying to Describe You to Someone (Wednesday album) =

Studio album by Wednesday
- Released: February 7, 2020
- Genre: Indie rock; shoegaze
- Length: 30:20

Wednesday chronology
| Yep Definitely (2017) | I Was Trying to Describe You to Someone (2020) | Twin Plagues (2021) |

I Was Trying to Describe You to Someone is the second full-length studio album by the American band Wednesday. It was released on February 7, 2020.

== Critical reception ==
I Was Trying to Describe You to Someone received generally positive reviews upon its release. Reviewing the album for Melted Magazine, Savannah Woodard writes "...the quality of product that Wednesday has created is evident of the talent, work, and emotions that have been poured into every track on this album" and that "Wednesday has created a truly unique and note-worthy album; one that will be marked from now on as an important moment for the band and the underground music scene." Rob Maura, reviewing the album for Post-Trash, called it "endearingly messy and immediately identifiable" and "anxious and dissonant in all the right ways."

== Track listing ==
| No. | Title | Length |
|---|---|---|
| 1. | "Fate Is..." | 2:40 |
| 2. | "Billboard" | 2:56 |
| 3. | "Love Has No Pride (Condemned)" | 5:13 |
| 4. | "Underneath" | 5:17 |
| 5. | "November" | 3:25 |
| 6. | "Maura" | 3:07 |
| 7. | "Coyote" | 4:56 |
| 8. | "Revenge of the Lawn" | 2:46 |
| Total length: | | 30:20 |

== Personnel ==
- Karly Hartzman - vocals, guitar
- Xandy Chelmis - lap steel
- Daniel Gorham - guitar
- Alan Miller - drums
- Margo Schultz - bass
