= And the Wind (Live and Loose!) =

Live album by MJ Lenderman
- Released: November 17, 2023
- Venue: Lodge Room, Los Angeles, California; Lincoln Hall, Chicago, Illinois
- Genre: Indie rock
- Length: 54:23
- Label: Anti-
- Producer: MJ Lenderman

MJ Lenderman chronology
Boat Songs (2022)	And the Wind (Live and Loose!) (2023)	Manning Fireworks (2024)

And the Wind (Live and Loose!) is the first live album by American musician MJ Lenderman, released on November 17, 2023, through Anti-. It consists of recordings from two shows, one at the Pitchfork Music Festival afterparty held at the Lincoln Hall in Chicago and one at the Lodge Room in Los Angeles, in early 2023, and received positive reviews from critics.

== Critical reception ==
Professional ratings
Aggregate scores
Source	Rating
Metacritic	82/100
Review scores
Source	Rating
Exclaim!	6/10
Paste	9.0/10
Pitchfork	8.0/10

And the Wind (Live and Loose!) received a score of 82 out of 100 on review aggregator Metacritic based on four critics' reviews, indicating "universal acclaim". Paste named it album of the week, with the publication's Matt Mitchell describing it as "a crucial addition to not just Lenderman's discography, but to the compendium of contemporary live material altogether as we know it", going on to say that "the star-power of these tracks; their timelessness shines through so greatly that, when crowd applause and hollers come ringing in at every fadeout, you suddenly remember that this is, after all, a live album". Arielle Gordon of Pitchfork wrote that Lenderman "transforms his dreamlike narratives into something joyous, collective, and free" on the album, which she called "a document of friendship, the experience of watching the stories Lenderman wrote in isolation become bigger than their creator". Exclaim!'s Marko Djurdjic found it to be "a winding, expressive live album (that's a little less loose than its title would suggest)" as he wished that Lenderman had "leaned into the dive bar clatter and freewheeling wildness that always feels just at the periphery of his music".

== Track listing ==
And the Wind (Live and Loose!) track listing
No.	Title	Length
1.	"Hangover Game"	2:16
2.	"Knockin"	3:41
3.	"You Have Bought Yourself a Boat"	2:47
4.	"TLC Cagematch"	4:22
5.	"Rudolph"	6:18
6.	"Toontown"	4:11
7.	"Dan Marino"	2:32
8.	"Under Control"	2:25
9.	"SUV"	2:01
10.	"Catholic Priest"	3:31
11.	"Live Jack"	3:02
12.	"Someone Get the Grill Out of the Rain"	2:20
13.	"You Are Every Girl to Me"	6:21
14.	"Tastes Just Like It Costs"	4:30
15.	"Long Black Veil" (featuring Styrofoam Winos)	4:06
Total length:		54:23

== Personnel ==
- MJ Lenderman – vocals, guitar
- Jon Samuels – guitar
- Colin Miller – drums
- Xandy Chelmis – pedal steel guitar
- Ethan Baechtold – bass guitar
- Alex Farrar – mixing and mastering

== Charts ==
Chart performance for And the Wind (Live and Loose!)
Chart (2025)	Peak position
Scottish Albums (Official Charts)	71
UK Independent Albums (Official Charts)	35
