= Precipice (album) =

Studio album by Indigo De Souza
- Released: July 25, 2025
- Studio: Pee Jar; 64 Sound; Garden
- Genre: Pop
- Length: 31:43
- Label: Loma Vista
- Producer: Indigo De Souza; Elliott Kozel

Indigo De Souza chronology
Some Evil Fantasy (2024)	Precipice (2025)

Singles from Precipice
- 1. "Heartthrob" Released: April 30, 2025; 2. "Crying Over Nothing" Released: June 4, 2025; 3. "Be Like the Water" Released: July 8, 2025

Precipice is the fourth studio album by the American singer-songwriter Indigo De Souza. Produced by De Souza with Elliott Kozel, the album was released on July 25, 2025, by Loma Vista Recordings. The album was preceded by three singles: "Heartthrob", "Crying Over Nothing", and "Be Like Water".

Precipice received generally positive reviews from music critics.

== Background and recording ==
De Souza traveled to Los Angeles, where she met Elliott Kozel for the first time during a "blind session" in his recording studio. In the first hour of their session, Kozel composed an instrumental using a synthesizer and vocal sample, which led De Souza to write the lyrics of "Not Afraid" in ten minutes.

The album had been completed by September 2024. Shortly after, De Souza's home in Asheville, North Carolina was severely damaged by Hurricane Helene while she was on tour, prompting her to return to Los Angeles and record "a whole other album" with Kozel.

== Composition ==
De Souza credited Charli XCX, Mura Masa, Justin Bieber, and Caroline Polachek as influences on her decision to record a pop album.

== Release ==
De Souza announced the album on April 30, 2025, alongside the lead single "Heartthrob" and its music video directed by Neta Ben Ezra. The second single, "Crying Over Nothing", was released on June 4 with a video directed by Kai Dickson. She also announced tour dates spanning from July to November, including performances at the Pitchfork Music Festival in Paris and London. The final single before the album's release, "Be Like the Water", was released with a lyric video on July 8.

Precipice was released on July 25, 2025, through Loma Vista Recordings. The same day, De Souza hosted a fan event in Williamsburg, Brooklyn, where she performed acoustic versions of songs from the album and held a Q&A with attendees.

== Critical reception ==
Professional ratings
Aggregate scores
Source	Rating
Metacritic	70/100
Review scores
Source	Rating
AllMusic	2.5/5 stars
Clash	9/10
Dork	3/5
Far Out	2.5/5 stars
The Line of Best Fit	9/10
New Noise Magazine	3.5/5 stars
Our Culture Mag	4/5 stars
Paste	8.2/10
Pitchfork	6.6/10
Uncut	7/10

Precipice received generally positive reviews from music critics. At Metacritic, which assigns a normalized rating out of 100 to reviews from mainstream critics, the album received an average score of 70, based on eight reviews. Writing for The Line of Best Fit, John Amen scored the album 9/10 and commented, "Precipice is that rare album that brings together vulnerability, self-reflection, and the trademarks of a mainstream milestone: super earworms, coolly cosmopolitan sonics, and a voice that grows more compelling with each track".

== Track listing ==
Precipice track listing
No.	Title	Writer(s)	Length
1.	"Be My Love"	Indigo De Souza	2:19
2.	"Crying Over Nothing"	De Souza; Elliott Kozel	3:15
3.	"Crush"	De Souza; Kozel; Jonathan Smith	2:31
4.	"Not Afraid"	De Souza; Kozel	3:15
5.	"Be Like the Water"	De Souza; Kozel	3:28
6.	"Heartthrob"	De Souza; Kozel	3:13
7.	"Dinner"	De Souza; Kozel	2:01
8.	"Clean It Up"	De Souza; Kozel	2:57
9.	"Heartbreaker"	De Souza; Kozel; Jesse Schuster	2:53
10.	"Pass It By"	De Souza; Kozel	2:22
11.	"Precipice"	De Souza; Kozel; Schuster	3:25
Total length:			31:43

== Personnel ==
Credits adapted from the album's liner notes.

- Indigo De Souza – vocals, production, instrumentation
- Elliott Kozel – production, recording, instrumentation
- Jesse Schuster – production (track 9), upright bass (1, 2, 10, 11), guitar (2, 6, 9), piano (11)
- Tyler Karmen – additional drum recording
- Andy Baldwin – additional drum recording
- Steve Kaye – mixing
- Jannick Frampton – mix engineering assistance
- Ruairi O'Flaherty – mastering
- Joe Nino-Hernes – vinyl cut
- Landon George – bass guitar (5, 6, 9, 10)
- Maddie Schuler – lap steel (1, 4, 9), guitar (5)
- Jonathan Smith – drums (3, 5, 6, 9)
- Kosta Galanopoulos – drums (4, 8, 11)
- Kimberly Obarhammer – cover art
- Daniel Barlow – cover art photography
- Hannah Sommer – insert photography
- Natalia Szmidt – package design
