= Any Shape You Take =

Studio album by Indigo De Souza
- Released: August 27, 2021
- Genres: Indie rock; alternative rock; grunge pop; synth-pop
- Label: Saddle Creek
- Producers: Indigo De Souza; Brad Cook

Indigo De Souza chronology
I Love My Mom (2018)	Any Shape You Take (2021)	All of This Will End (2023)

Any Shape You Take is the second album by North Carolina-based singer Indigo De Souza. It was released on August 27, 2021, by Saddle Creek Records. It was recorded with Brad Cook, who has worked alongside musicians like Liz Phair, Bon Iver, and Waxahatchee.

== Composition ==
Any Shape You Take's "hooky, jagged" indie rock songs have been described collectively as a "masterwork" of the genre. And for being "steeped in alternative '90s goodness", it has been compared to works by bands such as the Breeders and Dinosaur Jr. Meanwhile, the album's grunge-influenced rock tracks have been regarded as a "masterful slice of grunge pop".

== Critical reception ==
Professional ratings
Aggregate scores
Source	Rating
AnyDecentMusic?	8.2/10
Metacritic	84/100
Review scores
Source	Rating
AllMusic	3/5 stars
The A.V. Club	A−
Gigwise	10/10
The Line of Best Fit	9/10
Loud and Quiet	7/10
NME	4/5 stars
Paste	8.6/10
Pitchfork	8.3/10
The Skinny	4/5 stars
Uncut	8/10

Any Shape You Take received critical acclaim. On Metacritic, it holds a score of 84 out of 100, indicating "universal acclaim", based on fifteen reviews.

Alex McLevy for The A.V. Club applauded the record, seeing it as "ferocious and vulnerable in equal measure" and "one of the year's best." Jason Anderson for Uncut called De Souza's songs "as jagged as they are exuberant." Gigwise saw the album as imbuing "existentialism in an intricately crafted mixture of melancholy joy." The Line of Best Fit dubbed De Souza's songwriting as "unafraid of expressing (neither) the depths nor the heights of a life lived with supreme sensitivity."

=== Accolades ===
Any Shape You Take on year-end lists
Publication	List	Rank	Ref.
Paste	The 50 Best Albums of 2021	25	
Pitchfork	The 50 Best Albums of 2021	25	
Pitchfork	The 31 Best Rock Albums of 2021	—	

== Track listing ==
1. "17" – 3:06
2. "Darker than Death" – 3:12
3. "Die/Cry" – 2:26
4. "Pretty Pictures" – 2:58
5. "Real Pain" – 4:50
6. "Bad Dream" – 4:52
7. "Late Night Crawler" – 4:17
8. "Hold U" – 4:16
9. "Way Out" – 4:01
10. "Kill Me" – 4:20
