= Boat Songs =

Studio album by MJ Lenderman
- Released: April 29, 2022
- Studios: Drop of Sun, Asheville, North Carolina
- Genres: Indie rock; alt-country
- Length: 33:40
- Label: Dear Life
- Producer: MJ Lenderman

MJ Lenderman chronology
Ghost of Your Guitar Solo (2021)	Boat Songs (2022)	And the Wind (Live and Loose!) (2023)

Singles from Boat Songs
- 1. "Hangover Game" Released: January 2022; 2. "TLC Cage Match" Released: March 2022

Boat Songs is the third solo album by American musician MJ Lenderman. It was released on April 29, 2022, by Dear Life Records. The album was listed on several publications' lists of the best albums of 2022.

== Release ==
On January 25, 2022, Stereogum managing editor Chris DeVille announced the release date of the album alongside the music video for "Hangover Game," comparing the album to Jason Molina, Uncle Tupelo, and Pinegrove. In March, Stereogum senior editor Tom Breihan posted the music video for second single "TLC Cage Match." The song is named after the tables, ladders, and chairs WWE match style, which it uses as a metaphor for self-destructive behavior.

On April 29, 2022, Boat Songs was released on Dear Life Records via Bandcamp in digital form, CD, vinyl, and cassette.

== Critical reception ==
Professional ratings
Review scores
Source	Rating
Pitchfork	8.3/10
Uncut	4/5 stars

Sasha Geffen at Pitchfork praised Lenderman's alt-country songwriting for its "disarming insights into the fray of living" delivered with fuzzy, lo-fi distortion, "loping, lackadaisical melodic phrasing," and "gentle, unhurried deadpan." Dillon Riley, writing for Flood Magazine, characterized Lenderman's writing as economical, yet low-brow compared to the more literary writing of his Wednesday bandmate Karly Hartzman. Uncut's Erin Osmon described Boat Songs with comparisons to John Prine, Neil Young and Crazy Horse, and Drive-By Truckers's Patterson Hood, praising Lenderman's "refreshing and thoroughly unpretentious perspective" that, by imbuing working-class signifiers with depth and importance, blurs the boundary between high and low art.

In 2026, "Hangover Game" was listed as the 31st best rock song of the 21st-century by Rolling Stone. The same year, Pitchfork ranked the album as the 79th best indie-rock album of all time.

=== Year-end lists ===
Boat Songs on year-end lists
Publication	Accolade	Rank	Ref.
The A.V. Club	30 Best Albums of 2022	27	
The Alternative	Top 50 Albums of 2022	4	
The Bitter Southerner	(22) Best Southern Albums of 2022	9	
Consequence	Top 50 Albums of 2022	49	
Paste	50 Best Albums of 2022	10	
Pitchfork	50 Best Albums of 2022	35	
The Ringer	33 Best Albums of 2022	12	
Rolling Stone	100 Best Albums of 2022	98	
Stereogum	50 Best Albums of 2022	11	

== Track listing ==
Boat Songs track listing
No.	Title	Writer(s)	Length
1.	"Hangover Game"	MJ Lenderman	2:16
2.	"You Have Bought Yourself a Boat"	Lenderman	2:51
3.	"TLC Cage Match"	Lenderman	3:52
4.	"Toontown"	Lenderman, Andrew James	3:56
5.	"SUV"	Lenderman	1:57
6.	"Under Control"	Lenderman	2:19
7.	"Dan Marino"	Lenderman	2:15
8.	"You Are Every Girl to Me"	Lenderman	3:50
9.	"Tastes Just Like It Costs"	Lenderman	3:47
10.	"Six Flags"	Lenderman	6:36
Total length:			33:40

== Personnel ==
Credits adapted from the album's Bandcamp release page.

- Xandy Chelmis – pedal steel
- Alex Farrar – guitar on "You Are Every Girl to Me", recording, mixing, production
- Colin Miller – production, mastering, bass, keys, trumpet
- Lewis Dahm – guitar on "You Are Every Girl to Me"
- Andrew James – writing on "Toontown", album art
- Jon Samuels – layout
- MJ Lenderman – production, all other instruments and writing

== Charts ==
Chart performance for Boat Songs
Chart (2025)	Peak position
UK Independent Albums (Official Charts)	48
UK Record Store (OCC)	26
