= Twin Plagues =

Studio album by Wednesday
- Released: August 13, 2021
- Studio: Drop of Sun (Asheville)
- Genres: Grunge; guitar-pop; indie rock; shoegazing
- Label: Orindal
- Producers: Alex Farrar; Adam McDaniel; Jake Lenderman

Wednesday chronology
I Was Trying to Describe You to Someone (2020)	Twin Plagues (2021)	Mowing the Leaves Instead of Piling 'em Up (2021)

Twin Plagues is the third studio album by American band Wednesday, released by Orindal Records on August 13, 2021.

== Composition ==
Twin Plagues has musical footing in "punchy" grunge pop and "vitreous" guitar-pop, and is "as indie rock as it gets." It also leans into dissonant noise pop and shoegazing sounds.

== Critical reception ==
Professional ratings
Review scores
Source	Rating
DIY	3.5/5 stars
Pitchfork	7.4/10

Twin Plagues was welcomed with generally positive reviews upon its release. Kelly Liu of Pitchfork saw the band's sound as "big and loud...with an undercurrent of anxiety beneath the clutter."

=== Accolades ===
Twin Plagues on year-end lists
Publication	List	Rank	Ref.
Paste	The 50 Best Albums of 2021	31	
Pitchfork	The 31 Best Rock Albums of 2021	—	

== Track listing ==
All tracks are written by Karly Hartzman, except where noted.

No.	Title	Writer(s)	Length
1.	"Twin Plagues"		4:08
2.	"Handsome Man"		2:28
3.	"The Burned Down Dairy Queen"		3:08
4.	"Cliff"		2:40
5.	"How Can You Live If You Can't Love How Can You If You Do"		3:02
6.	"Cody's Only"		2:31
7.	"Toothache"		2:39
8.	"Birthday Song"		3:16
9.	"One More Last One"	Xandy Chelmis	3:19
10.	"Three Sisters"	Hartzman; Jake Lenderman	2:16
11.	"Gary's"		2:11
12.	"Ghost of a Dog"	Edie Brickell; Kenny Withrow	2:24

== Personnel ==
Wednesday

- Karly Hartzman – vocals, guitar, arrangements, cover photo
- Jake Lenderman – guitar, arrangements, recording and production on "Ghost of a Dog"
- Xandy Chelmis – lap steel, arrangements, vocals on "One More Last One"
- Margo Schultz – bass, arrangements
- Alan Miller – drums, arrangements

Technical

- Alex Farrar and Adam McDaniel – recording and production on all tracks except "Ghost of a Dog"
- Scoops Dardaris – mastering
