= MJ Lenderman =

American musician (born 1999)

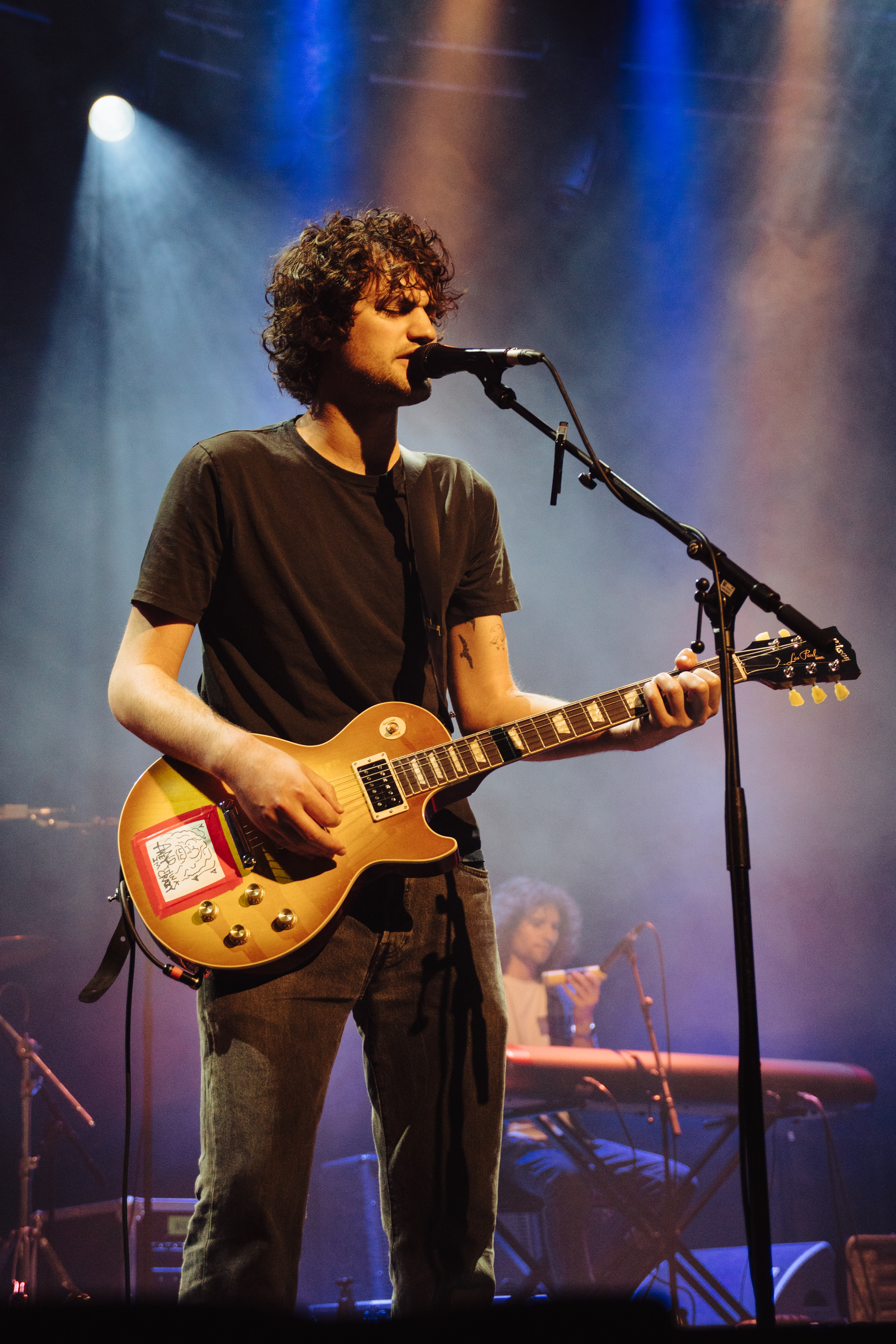
- Lenderman performing in 2025

Background information
- Born: Mark Jacob Lenderman; February 4, 1999 (age 27); Asheville, North Carolina, U.S.
- Genres: Indie rock; alt-country; country rock; slacker rock
- Instruments: Vocals; guitar; bass guitar; drums
- Years active: 2018–present
- Label: Anti-
- Member of: Wednesday; Snocaps
- Website: www.mjlenderman.com

Mark Jacob Lenderman (born February 4, 1999), also known as MJ Lenderman and Jake Lenderman, is an American singer-songwriter and multi-instrumentalist. His style has been described as indie rock and alternative country.

Alongside his solo career, Lenderman is a member of the indie rock band Wednesday, with whom he has recorded four studio albums: Twin Plagues (2021), Mowing the Leaves Instead of Piling 'Em Up (2022), Rat Saw God (2023) and Bleeds (2025). He is currently a non-touring member of the band, after taking a step back from live performances in 2025 to focus on his solo career.

Lenderman's solo career began to gain traction with his 2022 album, Boat Songs, followed by 2024's Manning Fireworks, which was released to widespread critical acclaim. During live performances, Lenderman is joined by his backing band the Wind, which includes bandmates Landon George (bass, fiddle), Jon Samuels (guitar), Xandy Chelmis (pedal steel), Ethan Baechtold (keys), and Colin Miller (drums).

Described by Waxahatchee frontwoman Katie Crutchfield as one of her "most trusted collaborators," Lenderman contributed significantly to Waxahatchee's sixth studio album, Tigers Blood (2024), and became a member of her band Snocaps in 2025, releasing one self-titled studio album in October that same year. Lenderman is also a former member of singer-songwriter Indigo De Souza's backing band, appearing on her first two studio albums, I Love My Mom (2018) and Any Shape You Take (2021), primarily as a drummer.

== Biography ==
=== Early life and education ===
Lenderman was born in Asheville, North Carolina, and grew up in a family of musicians. He started playing guitar around seven or eight years old. His great-grandfather was saxophonist Charlie Ventura. He was raised Catholic and was an altar boy. He played basketball and obsessively watched tapes of Michael Jordan. He grew up listening to Mark Linkous and Jason Molina. In his junior and senior years of high school, he began posting his music to Bandcamp. Lenderman studied at UNC Asheville for three semesters.

=== 2018–2021: Early collaborations, solo albums and joining Wednesday ===
In 2018, Lenderman played the drums for fellow Asheville artist Indigo De Souza on her albums I Love My Mom and Any Shape You Take. Lenderman met Karly Hartzman, lead singer for the group Wednesday, and he joined the band for an EP called How Do You Let Love Into the Heart That Isn't Split Wide Open (2018).

In July 2019, he released a self-titled album, his first solo album. At that time, he was working in an ice cream shop to support himself financially.

Lenderman toured with Wednesday in early February 2020, until the COVID-19 pandemic ended the tour. During the pandemic, while collecting unemployment insurance, Lenderman wrote the songs that became the album Ghost of Your Guitar Solo, released in 2021.

=== 2022–2024: Boat Songs and Manning Fireworks ===
His third album, Boat Songs, was released in 2022 on Dear Life Records. It was listed as one of the best albums of 2022 by Pitchfork, The A.V. Club, Rolling Stone, and The Ringer. After the success of the album, Lenderman signed a recording contract with Anti-. In 2023, he released the singles "Rudolph" and "Knockin'".

Lenderman contributed guitar and vocals to the album Tiger's Blood by Waxahatchee, released in March 2024, and was listed as featured guest artist on the album's lead single, "Right Back To It". In March 2024, Lenderman performed "Right Back To It" with Waxahatchee on The Late Show with Stephen Colbert. Lenderman's next album, Manning Fireworks, was released in September 2024.

=== 2025–present: Bleeds, Snocaps and further collaborations ===
Lenderman departed as a touring member of Wednesday in 2025. He stated that he still planned to record with the group, and remained a full contributing member of the band on its sixth studio album, Bleeds, released in September 2025.

On October 31, 2025, Lenderman was revealed as a member of the surprise indie rock band Snocaps, which released its self-titled debut album, Snocaps, that same day. Fronted by Katie and Allison Crutchfield, the album features Lenderman on guitar, bass and drums throughout. The band played six shows in December 2025. Also in 2025, Lenderman (along with Katie Crutchfield and several others) contributed background vocals to soul singer Mavis Staples's covers record Sad and Beautiful World, named for the Sparklehorse song of the same name.

In 2026, Lenderman contributed significantly to Thomas Dollbaum's second studio album, Birds of Paradise, performing drums throughout, alongside additional guitar and backing vocals. Lenderman and his the Wind bandmates, Landon George and Xandy Chelmis, are set to feature on Wild Pink's forthcoming album, Still Coming Down, released on August 21, 2026 and produced by regular collaborator Alex Farrar. Lenderman wrote a foreword to a Penguin Classics edition of Harry Crews' 1990 book Body to be released in November 2026.

Lenderman, along with Colin Miller, produced and performed on Tracey Nelson's debut LP, Hercules, which was released on K Records on July 10, 2026. Hercules featured additional contributions from Landon George, as well as Wednesday members Karly Hartzman, Ethan Baechtold, and Xandy Chelmis.

== Critical reception ==
Critic Jeremy D. Larson, writing for Pitchfork, gave Lenderman's album Manning Fireworks an 8.7, calling it "witty and sincere, the mark of a songwriter finding his voice."

== Personal life ==
Lenderman was in a relationship with his Wednesday bandmate Karly Hartzman for six years. In July 2024, The Guardian reported that the two had split. In a February 2025 interview with GQ, Lenderman revealed that the two broke up in March 2024 while on tour in Tokyo and initially kept it a secret from other Wednesday members.

Lenderman was in a relationship with Water from Your Eyes vocalist Rachel Brown starting in 2024. The two broke up in November 2025.

== Discography ==
=== Albums ===
List of albums, with selected details
Title	Details
MJ Lenderman	Released: June 15, 2019; Label: Self-released (reissued by Dear Life Records)
Ghost of Your Guitar Solo	Released: March 26, 2021; Label: Dear Life Records
Boat Songs	Released: April 29, 2022; Label: Dear Life Records
And the Wind (Live and Loose!)	Released: November 17, 2023; Label: Anti-
Manning Fireworks	Released: September 6, 2024; Label: Anti-

=== Extended plays ===
List of EPs, with selected details
Title	Credit	Details
How Do You Let Love Into the Heart That Isn't Split Wide Open	MJ Lenderman & Wednesday	Released: December 13, 2018; Label: Self-released
Faucet	Nash to Stoudemire^{1}	Released: November 7, 2019; Label: Self-released
Lucky	MJ Lenderman	Released: December 25, 2019; Label: Self-released
Guttering	MJ Lenderman & Wednesday	Released: January 22, 2021; Label: Super Enema
DLDRG 002 – Knockin'	MJ Lenderman	Released: August 20, 2021; Label: Dear Life Records

^{1}Lenderman and Karly Harztman

=== Singles ===
Title	Year	Peak chart positions	Album
Title	Year	US AAA	Album
"Hangover Game"	2022	—	Boat Songs
"TLC Cage Match"	2022	—	Boat Songs
"Rudolph"	2023	—	Manning Fireworks
"Knockin'"	2023	—	Non-album single
"She's Leaving You"	2024	23	Manning Fireworks
"Wristwatch"	2025	23	Manning Fireworks
"Separate Ways"	2026		
