= Indigo De Souza =

American singer-songwriter (born 1997)

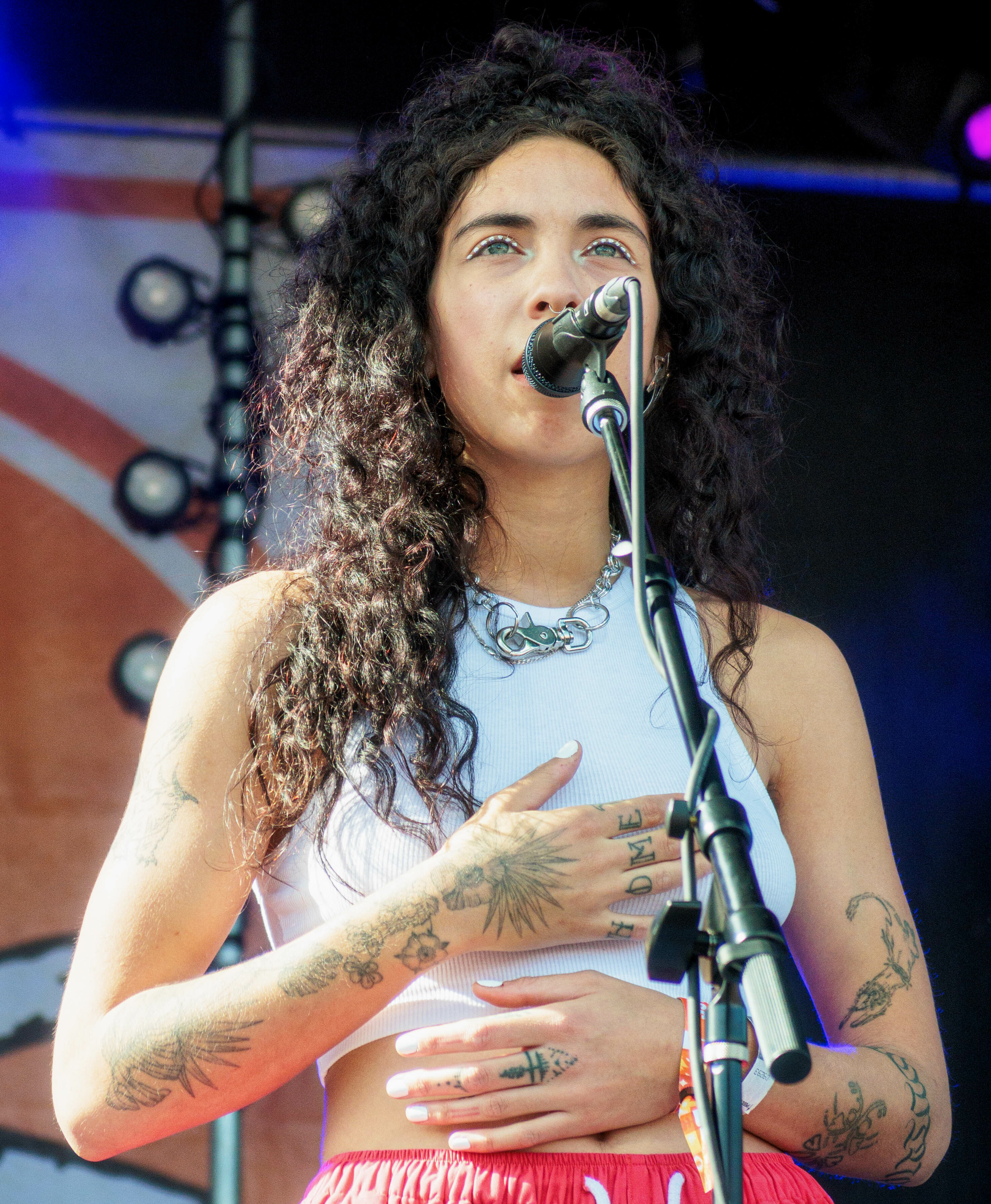
- De Souza performing in 2022

Background information
- Born: July 1, 1997 (age 29); Danbury, Connecticut, U.S.
- Origin: North Carolina, U.S.
- Genres: Indie rock; alternative rock
- Occupations: Singer; songwriter
- Instruments: Vocals; guitar; keyboards
- Years active: 2016–present
- Labels: Loma Vista; Saddle Creek

Indigo De Souza (born July 1, 1997) is an American singer-songwriter from Spruce Pine, North Carolina. Her (Note: De Souza uses both she/her and they/them pronouns and switches between them. This article uses she/her pronouns for consistency.) third album, All of This Will End, was released in April 2023. Her fourth album, Precipice, was released in July 2025. She has been noted for creating "intimate, anxious indie rock songs [that] wrangle with disappointment and relationship challenges," with personal and confessional lyrics.

== Early life ==
De Souza was born in Danbury, Connecticut, where she lived until the age of seven. She then grew up in Spruce Pine, North Carolina, where she and her artist mother, Kimberly Oberhammer, faced difficulty fitting in. De Souza's father is a Brazilian guitarist who was absent during much of her childhood. De Souza moved with her older sister to Asheville when she was 16.

== Career ==
=== 2016–2020: Boys, Don't Cry Just Do, and I Love My Mom ===
With encouragement from her mother, De Souza started making music at age 9, and began self-producing her own recordings in 2016. Her first release was an EP titled Boys that was recorded in a friend's garage, followed by another EP titled Don't Cry Just Do in 2017. She self-released her first full-length album, I Love My Mom, in June 2018. Saddle Creek Records discovered the album and gave it a proper release in 2021. The album gained notice from journalists for De Souza's lyrics on taboo topics.

=== 2021–2022: Any Shape You Take ===
De Souza co-produced her second album, Any Shape You Take, with Brad Cook, who has also produced for Bon Iver and Waxahatchee. The album was released in August 2021, and was noted for De Souza's emotional singing and her mastery of several different musical styles. The cover of the album features an apocalyptic supermarket overgrown with greenery, and is painted by De Souza's mother. On the song "Real Pain", De Souza included recordings of crowdsourced screams in the chorus, which she explained as "a representation of the idea that, no matter how separate our brains are, we all experience pain in such immense ways throughout our lives, and how that connects us". She noted the idea of personal change and growth as a central theme in the album.

De Souza toured with a full band featuring Dexter Webb (guitar), Zack Kardon (bass), and Avery Sullivan (drums). She also formed a neo soul side project called Icky Bricketts with Ethan Baechtold.

=== 2023–2024: All of This Will End ===
In February 2023, De Souza announced via social media that her next album All of This Will End would be released in April of that year. The announcement was paired with the release of a single called "Younger & Dumber" that same day. This was followed by two subsequent singles, "Smog" and "You Can Be Mean", released on March 8, 2023, and April 5, 2023, respectively. Both singles were released with accompanying music videos. De Souza described the concept of "Smog" as revealing her feelings of anxiety about living alone during the COVID-19 pandemic, when everything felt "unknown and distant", and described her emotional state as "delirious joy and a real tired hopelessness". De Souza revealed that "You Can Be Mean" is written about a brief toxic relationship and her realization that "I could choose not to allow harmful behavior into my life". All of This Will End was released on April 28, 2023, with 11 tracks. Compared to previous releases, De Souza says the album focuses more on acceptance and self-worth than obsession and desperation. The title "All This Will End" conveys De Souza's intention to focus on acknowledging but making peace with mortality and inevitable death by celebrating small moments in life.

De Souza embarked on a summer tour in support of the album, saying that she already had material written for another LP, and was hoping to explore the pop genre in the future.

=== 2025–present: Precipice ===
In April 2025, it was announced that De Souza would release her first album for Loma Vista, Precipice in July of that year. The announcement was accompanied by the release of the album's lead single, "Heartthrob". Precipice was released on July 25 with 11 tracks. The album is more pop-leaning than some of De Souza's previous work and presents a more polished sound in comparison with All of This Will End.

De Souza started a tour of the album in October and featured two international shows in the tour lineup. She plans to return for a spring tour.

== Personal life ==
For most of her life, De Souza resided in Asheville and maintained a close relationship with her mother, who paints her album cover art. She has said that she finds life while touring "crazy" and "unsustainable", but clarified that she still loves it. However, she has expressed disapproval of music festivals, saying that she feels they are "often about making money rather than being about art", and do not care about performing artists. She has also criticized the music industry as a whole as "money first" instead of "people first", and believes that the industry frequently disregards mental health. Despite this, she frequently expresses gratitude toward the close-knit community she has found in the industry.

De Souza was diagnosed with borderline personality disorder in 2023, following mental health issues while touring that prompted friends to stage an intervention. She credited the diagnosis for providing "a better picture of why [she is] the way [she is]".

During her tour in 2024, De Souza's house was hit by Hurricane Helene and was mostly destroyed. She has since relocated to Los Angeles and said she's written another record that's more grunge-centered.

== Artistry ==
On her straightforward writing style, De Souza remarked that she always wants to express exactly what she is feeling in the hopes that people will be able to relate to her music. De Souza also credits her exploration of mortality with allowing her to write openly, stating " I don't feel scared of being open about my feelings because they're fleeting, and I know that at the end of it all, I'm going to die".

Much of De Souza's discography is centered around the idea of death, with album All of This Will End and songs titled "Die/Cry" and "Kill Me". She states that exploring abstract concepts of death and mortality allows her to write songs true to herself, stating "the acceptance of mortality allows me to make music that is directly from the heart, and is completely true and is very vulnerable and raw". She also hopes to connect to listeners through the idea of loss and highlight the joy of community and the small moments "we have while we are here".

Imagery of nature also appears frequently in De Souza's lyrics and concept art, often in contrast to grocery stores or parking lots. De Souza has explained that she sees grocery stores as a symbol in her life where she feels out of touch with humanity, and that she prefers to connect with the earth and learn from nature. She also says that parking lots inspire her to consider nature before human intervention. De Souza says her work is heavily inspired by spending time in nature where she feels she can gain a deeper understanding of herself.

== Discography ==
=== Studio albums ===
List of studio albums, with selected chart positions
Title	Album details	Peak chart positions	
Title	Album details	US Heat.	US Sales
I Love My Mom	Released: June 8, 2018; Label: Self-released, Saddle Creek (2021 reissue); Formats: CD, digital download, streaming, LP	–	–
Any Shape You Take	Released: August 27, 2021; Label: Saddle Creek; Formats: LP, CD, cassette, digital download, streaming	–	–
All of This Will End	Released: April 28, 2023; Label: Saddle Creek; Formats: LP, CD, cassette, digital download, streaming	18	66
Precipice	Released: July 25, 2025; Label: Loma Vista; Formats: LP, CD, cassette, digital download, streaming	–	–

=== Extended plays ===
Title	EP details
Boys	Released: March 25, 2016; Label: Cement Hotel; Formats: Digital download, streaming, CD
Don't Cry Just Do	Released: September 19, 2017; Label: New Galaxy; Formats: Digital download, streaming
Indigo De Souza on Audiotree Live	Released: January 21, 2019; Label: Audiotree Music; Formats: Digital download, streaming
Wholesome Evil Fantasy	Released: September 20, 2024; Label: Loma Vista; Formats: Digital download, streaming

=== Singles ===
Title	Year	Peak chart positions	Album
Title	Year	US AAA	Album
"Nomoah"	2018	–	Non-album single
"Kill Me"	2021	–	Any Shape You Take
"Hold U"	2021	38	Any Shape You Take
"Real Pain"	2021	–	Any Shape You Take
"Ivy" (Frank Ocean cover)	2021	–	Non-album single
"Younger & Dumber"	2023	–	All of This Will End
"Smog"	2023	35	All of This Will End
"You Can Be Mean"	2023	–	All of This Will End
"Heartthrob"	2025	38	Precipice
