= Karly Hartzman =

American musician (born 1996)

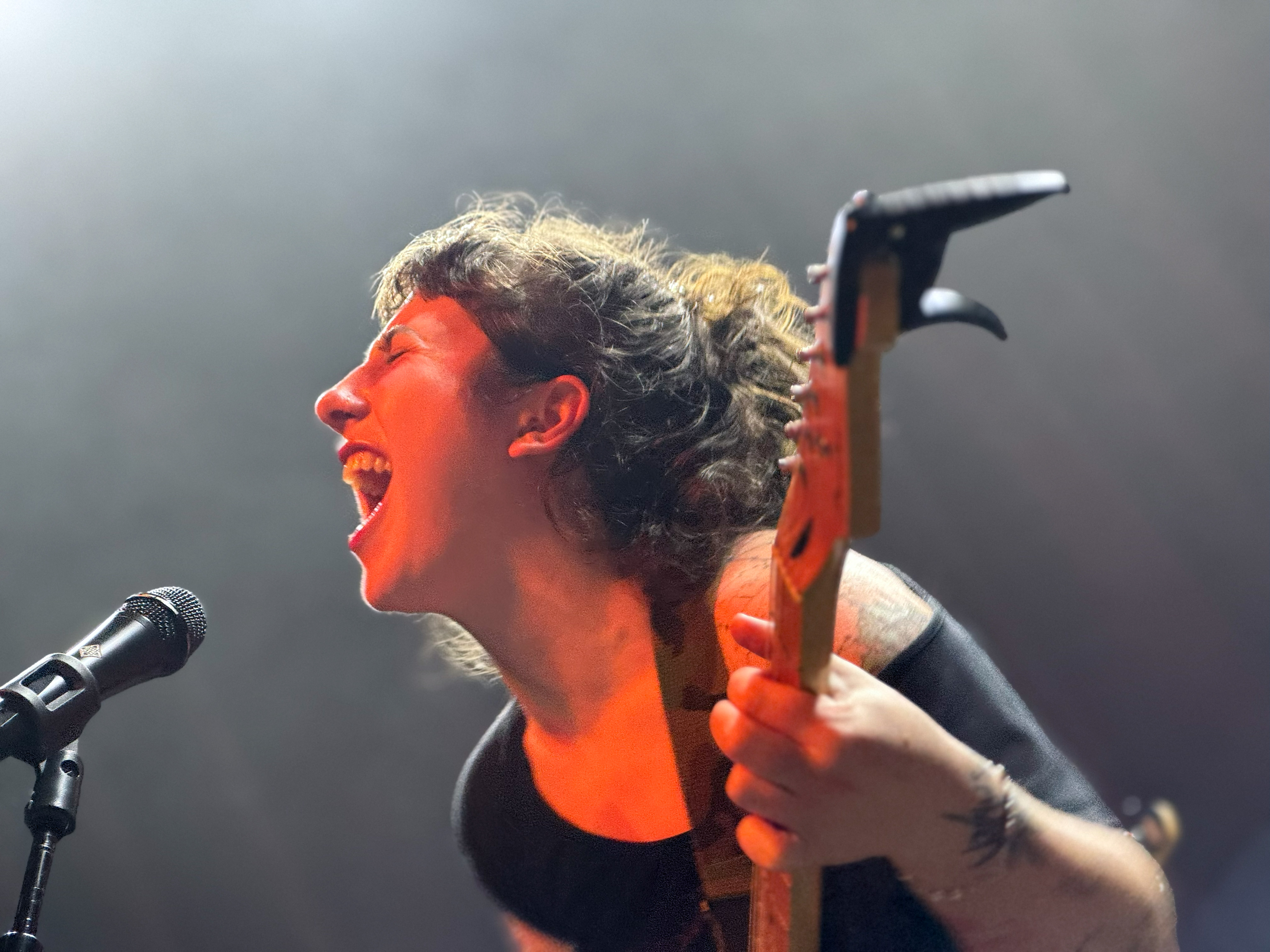
- Hartzman in 2024

Background information
- Born: November 1996 (age 29); Greensboro, North Carolina, U.S.
- Genres: Shoegaze; indie rock; alt-country; noise rock; slacker rock; alternative rock
- Occupations: Singer; songwriter; musician
- Instruments: Vocals; guitar
- Years active: 2017–present
- Member of: Wednesday
- Formerly of: Diva Sweetly
- Website: prisondivorcebombshell.com

Karly Matana Hartzman (born 1996) is an American singer, songwriter, and musician. She is best known as the frontwoman and principal songwriter of the rock band Wednesday, with whom she has recorded six studio albums.

== Early life ==
Hartzman was born in November 1996 in Greensboro, North Carolina. She was involved in musical theater as a child. While in college at the University of North Carolina Asheville, where she studied photography, Hartzman taught herself how to play guitar.

== Career ==
Hartzman started Wednesday as a solo project in 2017. The first Wednesday album, titled yep definitely, was released in January 2018. It was recorded with Hartzman's college friend Daniel Gorham, who would become the second member of the band, before leaving to become a member of the band Prince Daddy & the Hyena.

In 2018, she became a member of band Diva Sweetly, a spin-off of band Pictures of Vernon. Diva Sweetly released one album, In The Living Room, in 2019.

Soon after, Hartzman welcomed friends from the Asheville music scene into the Wednesday project, hoping to create music that better aligned with her artistic vision than the work of Diva Sweetly. The original line-up included Gorham and drummer Alan Miller; it later grew to include MJ Lenderman, Xandy Chelmis, and Margo Schultz. As of 2026, Gorham and Schultz are no longer members, and Lenderman no longer tours with the band. Ethan Baechtold and Jake "Spyder" Pugh are now members of the band.

With Wednesday, Hartzman has released six LPs and three EPs, as well as an Audiotree live album. In 2022, Wednesday signed to record label Dead Oceans.

In 2025, Hartzman, dressed in a nun costume, sang backing vocals for the band Mannequin Pussy during their performance on the TV show Everybody's Live with John Mulaney.

In 2026, Hartzman and her Wednesday bandmate Xandy Chelmis featured on the Weezer single, "We Might As Well Be Strangers."

Hartzman hosts a radio show on NTS called Prison Divorce Bombshell. She runs a blog under the same name.

== Personal life ==
Hartzman is Jewish.

Hartzman dated singer-songwriter and Wednesday bandmate MJ Lenderman for six years; they broke up while on tour in Tokyo in March 2024. She and Lenderman lived together in Haw Creek, Asheville. She has since relocated to her hometown of Greensboro.

Hartzman cites the bands Palberta, Unwound, Swirlies, Drive-By Truckers, Mannequin Pussy, The Sundays, Gouge Away, Loudon Wainwright III, Jessica Lea Mayfield, and Richard Buckner, among others, as musical influences. Her songwriting is influenced by authors including Lynda Barry, Richard Brautigan, and Mary Karr.
