= Wednesday (American band) =

American alternative rock band

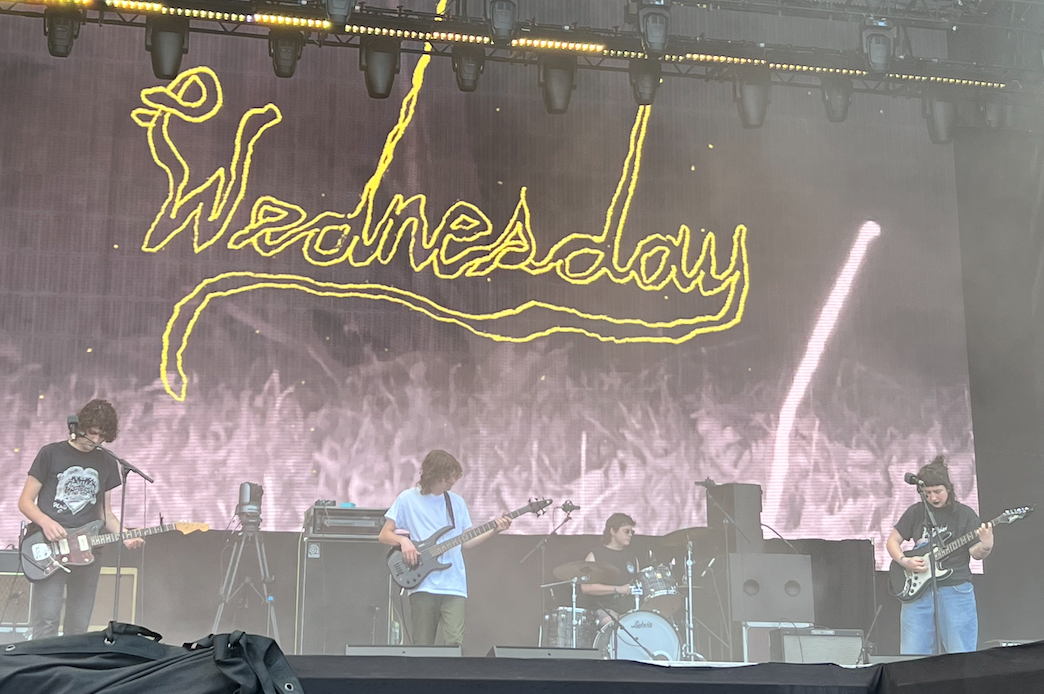
- Wednesday performing at Primavera Sound 2023

Background information
- Origin: Asheville, North Carolina, U.S.
- Genres: Shoegaze; indie rock; alt-country; noise rock; slacker rock
- Years active: 2017–present
- Labels: Orindal; Dead Oceans
- Members: Karly Hartzman; Alan Miller; Xandy Chelmis; Ethan Baechtold; MJ Lenderman (Note: Lenderman stopped touring with the band in February 2025)
- Past members: Daniel Gorham; Margo Schultz
- Website: wednesday.band

Wednesday is an American rock band formed in Asheville, North Carolina, in 2017. The band consists of Karly Hartzman (vocals, guitar), MJ Lenderman (guitar, backing vocals), Xandy Chelmis (pedal steel, backing vocals), Alan Miller (drums), and Ethan Baechtold (bass). The band's style has been described as a mixture of shoegaze, noise rock and alternative country, while their lyrical content has been praised for its storytelling about life in the American south.

Wednesday was formed in 2017 as a solo project of Karly Hartzman, with multi-instrumentalist Daniel Gorham joining shortly after the project's formation. The pair recorded the band's debut album, yep definitely (2018), as a duo. The band expanded to a five-piece with the addition of Miller, Chelmis and bass guitarist Margo Schultz. The band's second studio album, I Was Trying to Describe You to Someone, was released in 2020 to positive reviews, followed by Twin Plagues in 2021, which was the band's first album to feature Lenderman as a full contributing member. The band released a covers album titled Mowing the Leaves Instead of Piling 'em Up in 2022. Months after the album's release, the band left its label and signed with Dead Oceans.

In 2023, Wednesday released its fifth studio album, Rat Saw God, to widespread critical acclaim. It was the band's final album with Schultz, who painted the album's cover art. She was replaced by Baechtold ahead of extensive touring commitments. Their sixth album, Bleeds, was released on September 19, 2025, with Lenderman taking a step back from touring ahead of the album's release. He was replaced by Jake "Spyder" Pugh for the album's accompanying tour.

== Career ==
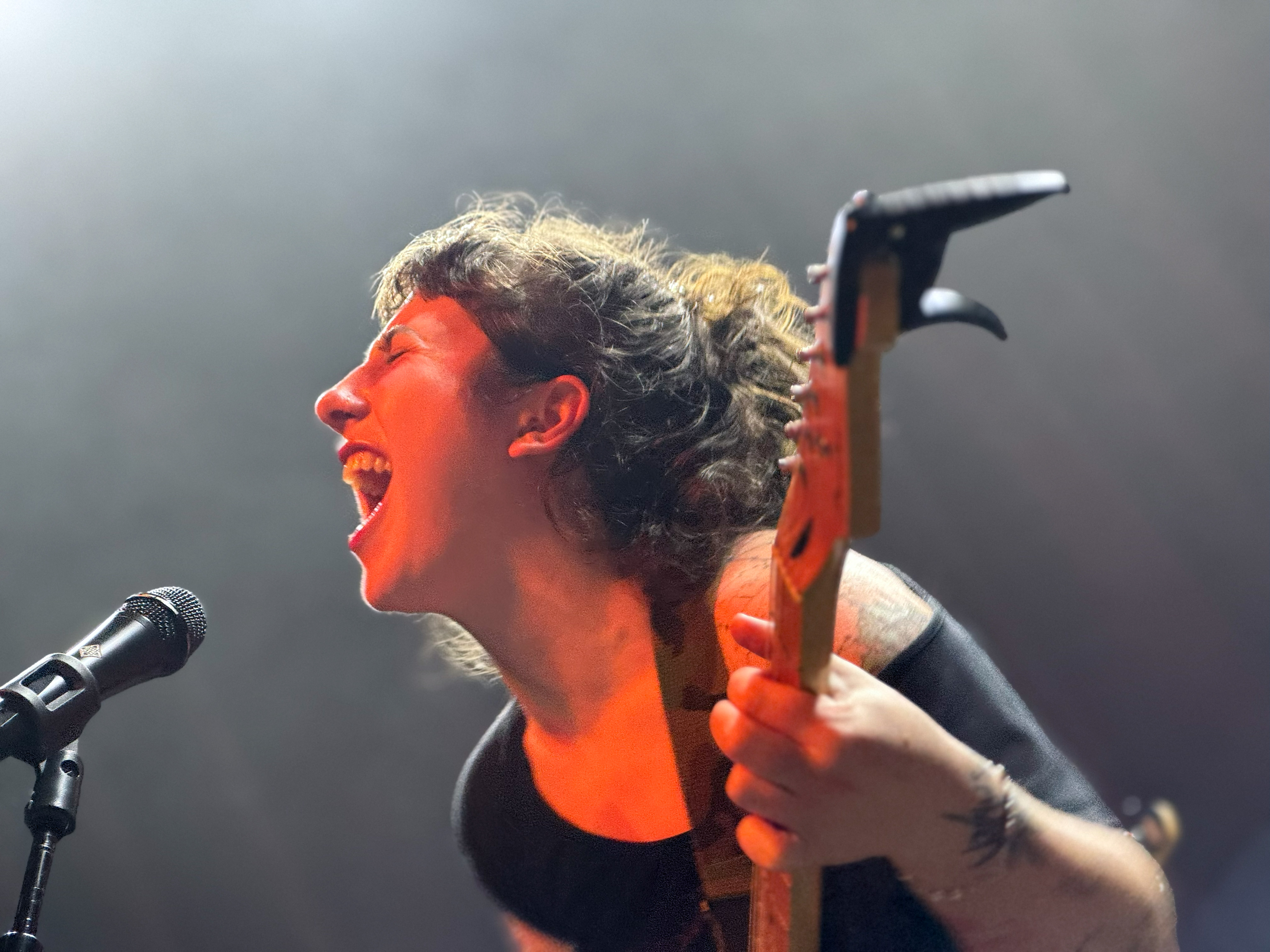
Karly Hartzman performing in Pittsburgh in January 2024.

=== 2017–2022: Formation and early work ===
Hartzman was inspired to start playing guitar after watching Mitski's NPR Tiny Desk concert. Wednesday initially began as a solo project of Hartzman's. Hartzman attended college in Asheville, where she met Daniel Gorham. The two recorded an album together under the moniker Wednesday titled yep definitely. The band's name was inspired by the British band The Sundays. In 2017, Hartzman met Lenderman after he slept over at Hartzman's family home after a show. Lenderman would join Wednesday in 2018 for an EP called How Do You Let Love Into the Heart That Isn’t Split Wide Open.

Hartzman and Gorham formed another band called Diva Sweetly, alongside members of the band Pictures of Vernon, which released an album in 2019. However, Hartzman was interested in making music that was closer to shoegaze, a departure from the style of Diva Sweetly. After Gorham left Wednesday to become a member of Prince Daddy & the Hyena, Hartzman gathered new members from the local music scene in Asheville to join Wednesday. The group released their second album, titled I Was Trying to Describe You to Someone in 2020. The group released their third record, Twin Plagues, on August 13, 2021. Twin Plagues is the first Wednesday album with Lenderman as a full member of the band.

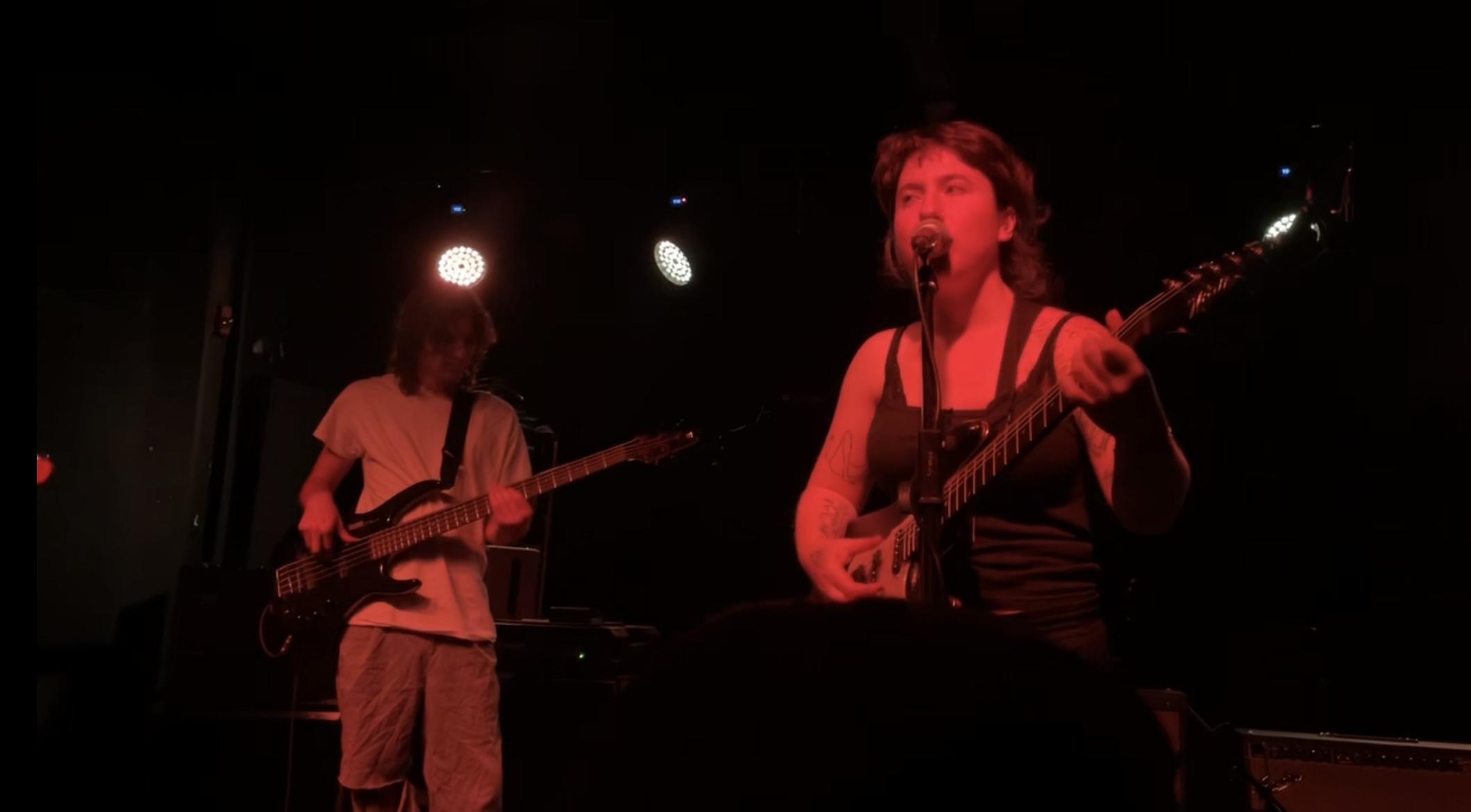
Hartzman and Baechtold playing with Wednesday in Grand Rapids, Michigan in 2023.

On March 11, 2022, the band released a covers album titled Mowing the Leaves Instead of Piling 'em Up, featuring cover versions of songs by Gary Stewart, Chris Bell, Roger Miller, Drive-By Truckers, Hotline TNT, Greg Sage, Vic Chesnutt, Medicine and The Smashing Pumpkins.

=== 2022–present: Rat Saw God and Bleeds ===
On September 8, 2022, the band left Orindal Records and signed to Dead Oceans, releasing the single "Bull Believer". On January 18, 2023, the band released the single "Chosen to Deserve" and announced a fifth album, Rat Saw God, which was released on April 7, 2023. It was the band's final album with bass guitarist Margo Schultz, who painted the album's artwork. She was replaced by Ethan Baechtold ahead of the album's tour.

The band performed at the Primavera Sound festival in Barcelona on June 4, 2023, where the band, playing on the Amazon Music stage, went on an anti-Amazon speech prior to "Bull Believer" and dedicated the song to "any warehouse workers who have ever been mistreated."

In March 2024, while Wednesday was touring in Tokyo, Hartzman and Lenderman broke up after six years. The two kept this hidden from the other members of the band, but it was eventually publicized in a July 2024 interview that Lenderman did with The Guardian.

In February 2025, Lenderman announced his departure from touring with the band. He remains a full contributing member of the band in the studio. Reflecting on Lenderman's decision to take a step back from touring, Hartzman stated: "Because we care about each other, it wasn’t difficult for me to accept that that’s what he needed. I know he needs that rest. He was able to say, definitively, that he’s still going to be on these records and in the band creatively, because he’s a non-negotiable part of our identity. The confidence in knowing that we’ll continue to take care of each other and nourish the parts that aren’t killing us, it’s been really nice."

In May 2025, Wednesday shared a new single, "Elderberry Wine", and performed it on The Late Show with Stephen Colbert with Lenderman performing as a member of the band. The band's sixth studio album, Bleeds, was released on September 19, 2025 to widespread critical acclaim.

For the album's accompanying tour, the band added guitarist Jake "Spyder" Pugh to their line-up. Reflecting on Pugh's arrival, Hartzman stated: "The chemistry of the band is obviously going to change, but he's playing the same parts, and [Lenderman's] still going to be recording with us. [...] I do sense change. The exciting part of it is that there will be new influences coming in, because Jake Pugh listens to very different music to MJ Lenderman. He makes avant garde, electronic, weirdo music, but is also a shredder on guitar. He was in this band called Nihilist Davis. [...] I'm mostly just excited about that - having a new element and knowing that MJ Lenderman will always be there to collaborate when we want to too."

In June 2026, Hartzman and Chelmis collaborated with Weezer for the single "We Might as Well Be Strangers", the second single from their 2026 album Weezer.

The band is scheduled to co-headline the North American Bitch Cabal Tour with Mannequin Pussy, which begins on October 30, 2026 in Asheville and conclude on November 18, 2026 in St. Louis. Snõõper and Truth Club will open on select dates.

== Musical style and influences ==
Wednesday's sound has been categorized as shoegaze, indie rock, alt-country, noise rock, slacker rock, and country rock. Hartzman said her first formative record was Reading, Writing and Arithmetic by The Sundays. After discovering the shoegaze band Swirlies, she knew she wanted to "combine The Sundays’ vocals with [Swirlies'] music and country lyrics." Hartzman also cites the band's lead guitarist and former romantic partner MJ Lenderman as an influence, having been a fan of his solo work since before the two met.

The band's music contains semi-autobiographical details about Hartzman's past life experiences in Greensboro, North Carolina, claiming "where I'm [Hartzman] from is the most original thing about me". AllMusic described the band's lyrics as "personal meditations on Southern life". Themes explored in the songs include psychological trauma, doubt and anxiety. Some songs combine minor details in the environment with darker tales of drug abuse. Hartzman credits the alternative country band Drive-By Truckers as a songwriting influence, mentioning the band in the song "Bath County". According to pop culture website The Ringer, the band was also influenced by "country storytellers" like Lucinda Williams and Richard Buckner.

Additionally, several Wednesday songs have since made reference to Hartzman and Lenderman's relationship, though they have since split.

== Band members ==
Current members

- Karly Hartzman – lead vocals, rhythm guitar (2017–present)
- Alan Miller – drums (2017–present)
- Xandy Chelmis – pedal steel, lap steel, backing vocals (2020–present)
- MJ Lenderman – lead guitar, backing vocals (2020–present; touring hiatus 2025–present)
- Ethan Baechtold – bass guitar (2023–present)

Current touring musicians

- Jake "Spyder" Pugh – lead guitar (2025–present; substitute for MJ Lenderman)

Former members

- Daniel Gorham – lead guitar, bass guitar, synthesizer, drums (2017–2019)
- Margo Schultz – bass guitar (2020–2022)

Timeline

== Discography ==
=== Studio albums ===
Title	Details
Yep Definitely	Released: January 31, 2018; Label: Self-released
I Was Trying to Describe You to Someone	Released: February 7, 2020; Label: Orindal Records
Twin Plagues	Released: August 13, 2021; Label: Orindal Records
Mowing the Leaves Instead of Piling 'Em Up	Released: March 11, 2022; Label: Orindal Records
Rat Saw God	Released: April 7, 2023; Label: Dead Oceans
Bleeds	Released: September 19, 2025; Label: Dead Oceans

=== Live albums ===
Title	Details
Wednesday on Audiotree Live	Released: September 21, 2021; Label: Audiotree

=== Extended plays ===
Title	Details
How Do You Let the Love Into the Heart That Isn't Split Wide Open (with MJ Lenderman)	Released: December 13, 2018; Label: Sub-Fi
Wednesday	Released: May 20, 2019; Label: Manic Static
Guttering (with MJ Lenderman)	Released: January 22, 2021; Label: Super Enema

=== Singles ===
Song	Year	Peak chart positions			Album
Song	Year	US AAA	US Alt.	CAN Rock	Album
"Fate Is" / "Billboard"	2019	—	—	—	I Was Trying to Describe You to Someone
"November"	2020	—	—	—	I Was Trying to Describe You to Someone
"Handsome Man"	2021	—	—	—	Twin Plagues
"Cody's Only"	2021	—	—	—	Twin Plagues
"One More Last One"	2021	—	—	—	Twin Plagues
"How Can You Live If You Can't Love How Can You If You Do"	2021	—	—	—	Twin Plagues
"She's Actin' Single (I'm Drinkin' Doubles)"	2022	—	—	—	Mowing the Leaves Instead of Piling 'em Up
"Feast of Snakes"	2022	—	—	—	Non-album single
"Bull Believer"	2022	—	—	—	Rat Saw God
"Chosen to Deserve"	2023	—	—	—	Rat Saw God
"Elderberry Wine"	2025	11	—	—	Bleeds
"Wound Up Here (By Holdin On)"	2025	—	—	—	Bleeds
"Pick Up That Knife"	2025	—	—	—	Bleeds
"Townies"	2025	27	—	—	Bleeds
"We Might as Well Be Strangers" (Weezer feat. Wednesday)	2026	14	1	23	Weezer
