= Birthday Boy =

Birthday Boy may refer to:

== Film and television ==
- Birthday Boy (2004 film), a short animated film by Sejong Park
- Birthday Boy (2022 film), a Panamanian thriller drama film
- "Birthday Boy" (Squirrel Boy), an episode of Squirrel Boy
- "Birthday Boy" (Without a Trace), an episode of Without a Trace
- "Birthday Boy" is an episode of Whatever Happened to the Likely Lads?
- The Birthday Boy, a 2024 Indian Telugu-language film

== Literature and art ==
- "Birthday Boy" (short story), an unpublished short story by J. D. Salinger
- The Birthday Boys, a 1991 novel by Beryl Bainbridge
- Birthday Boy, a 1983 painting by Eric Fischl

== Music ==
- Birthday Boy (album), a 1995 album by Junkhouse, or the title song
- "Birthday Boy", a song by Drive-By Truckers from The Big To-Do
- "Birthday Boy", a song by Pet Shop Boys from Release
- "Birthday Boy", a song by The Residents from Duck Stab/Buster & Glen
- "Birthday Boy", a song by Robin Trower from Caravan to Midnight
- "Birthday Boy", a song by Ween from GodWeenSatan: The Oneness
- "Birthday Boy (Drama)", a song by Montt Mardié from Clocks/Pretender

== See also ==
- Birthday Girl (disambiguation)
