= P54 =

P54 may refer to:

== Aircraft ==
- Percival P.54 Survey Prince, a British reconnaissance aircraft
- P.Z.L. P.54 Ryś, a Polish heavy fighter design project
- Vultee XP-54, an American prototype fighter aircraft

== Vessels ==
- ARA Bartolomé Cordero (P-54), a patrol vessel of the Argentine Navy
- HMS Unshaken (P54), a submarine of the Royal Navy
- INS Sarayu (P54), a patrol vessel of the Indian Navy sold in 2000
- INS Saryu (P54), a patrol vessel of the Indian Navy commissioned in 2013

== Other uses ==
- Papyrus 54, a biblical manuscript
- Peugeot 408 (P54), a crossover car
- P54, a state regional road in Latvia
