= Margarita Ball =

Dallas Margarita Society (Dallas Children's Charities) is a 501(c)(3) charitable corporation formed in 1977 when a group of Dallas businessmen decided to host a holiday party. That event, the annual Dallas Margarita Ball, has grown into the largest, invitation-only, charity black tie gala in the world with over 12,000 guests attending. Guests drop off donated toys upon entry to the ball or sponsor gifts with cash donations.

As the annual Dallas Margarita Ball has expanded over four decades, so have the organization's goals. They have preserved the founders' original intent – to provide gifts for "at risk youth" in the Dallas area during the holiday season. The event now provides support to over 50 regional children's charities with gifts of cash, toys, computers, exercise gear, and school supplies, not just at Christmas, but throughout the year. Over its history, the organization and its supporters have contributed millions of hours of community service and millions of dollars in gifts, including over 200,000 toys.
