= Louis Lafon =

French photographer

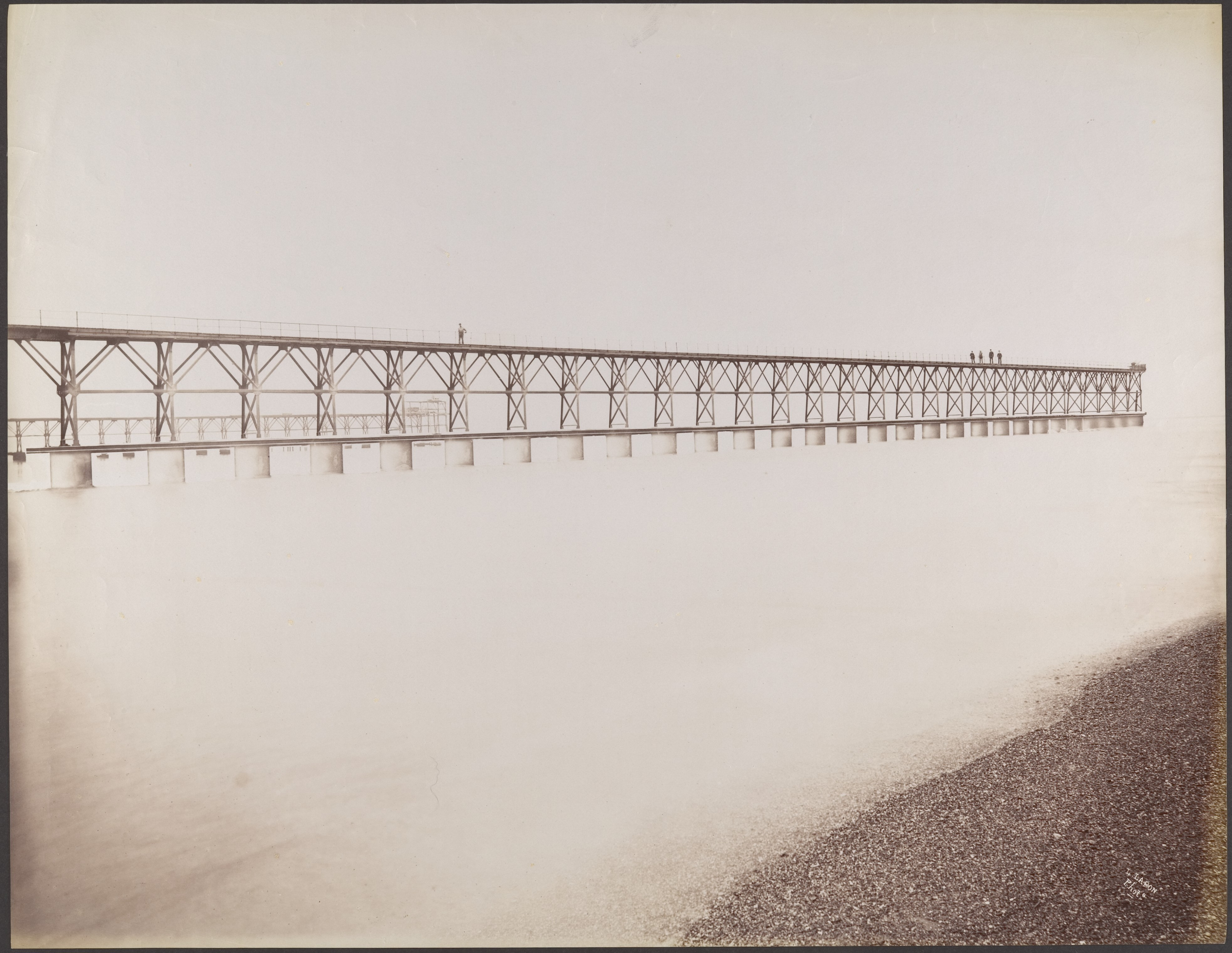
Tubular Jetty, Mouth of the Adour, Port of Bayonne. 1892.

Louis Lafon was a French photographer active between the 1870s and 1890s. He is noted for having photographed industrial scenes as well as landscapes involving man-made artifacts.

== Work ==
The Metropolitan Museum of Art has written about Lafon, “He was based in Paris, photographed primarily industrial subjects, and won a medal for his submissions to the 1874 exhibition of the Société Française de Photographie.”

Lafon used the albumen print technique, which produces a glossy surface on the images.

Lafon created a large scale (by 19th c. standards) photograph (now in the collection of Princeton University Library) of a high-speed printing press fabricated by Hippolyte Marinoni (Presse Universelle). The press revolutionized the mechanical reproduction industry.

== Collections ==
Lafon's work is included in the collection of the Metropolitan Museum of Art, the National Gallery of Art, Washington, the Clark Art Institute, and the Museum of Fine Arts Houston.

== Gallery ==
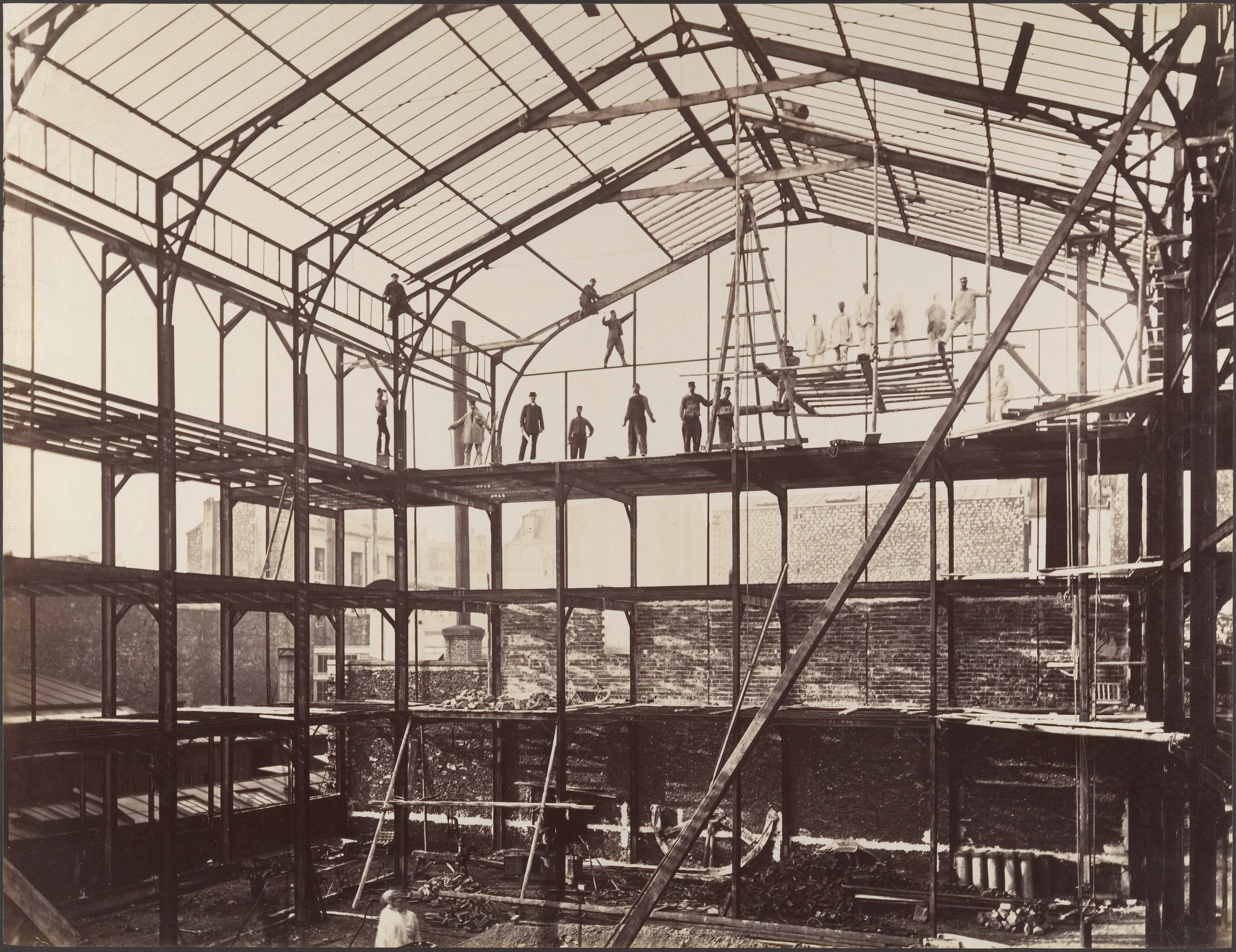
Construction Site, 1880s

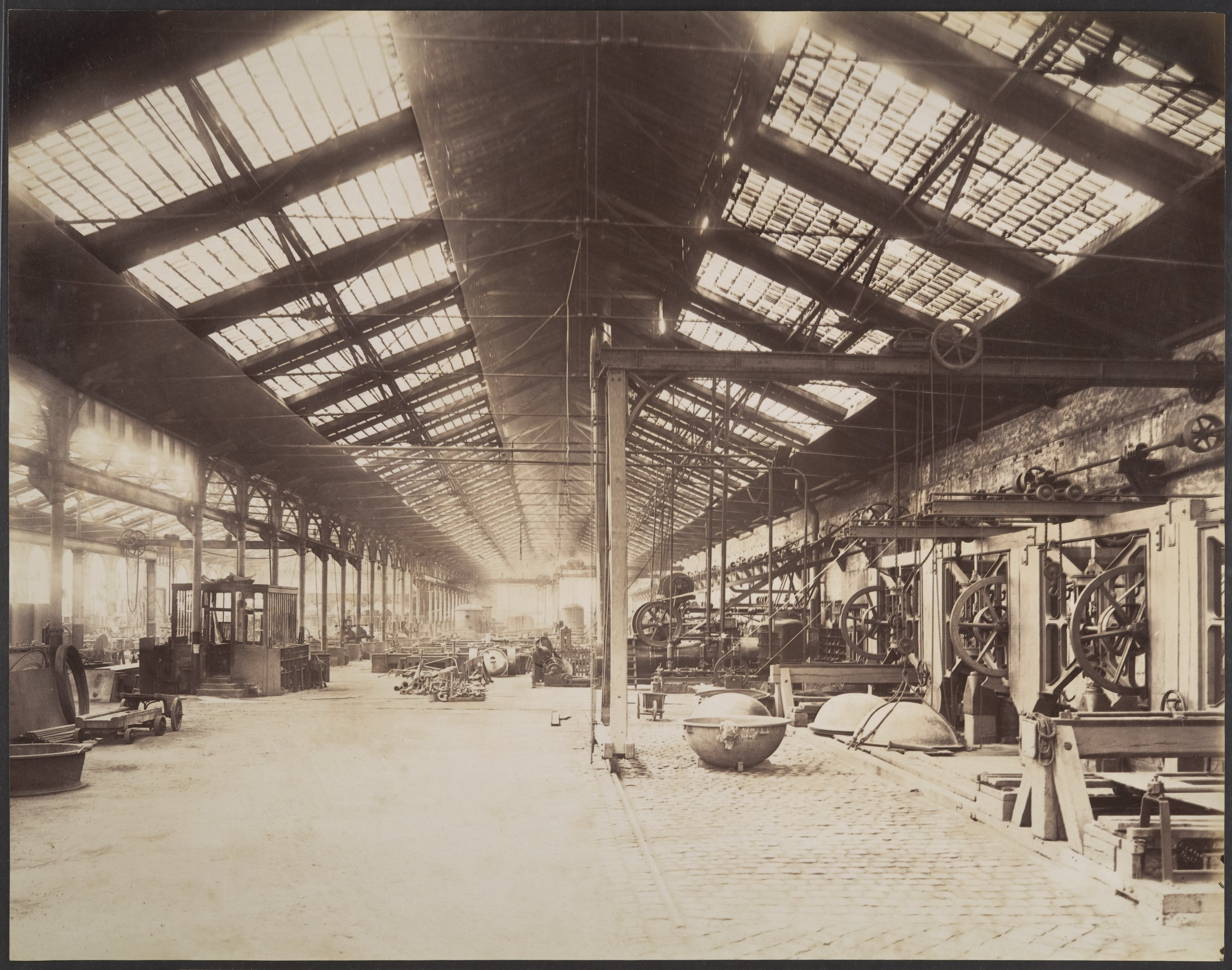
Factory Interior, 1880.

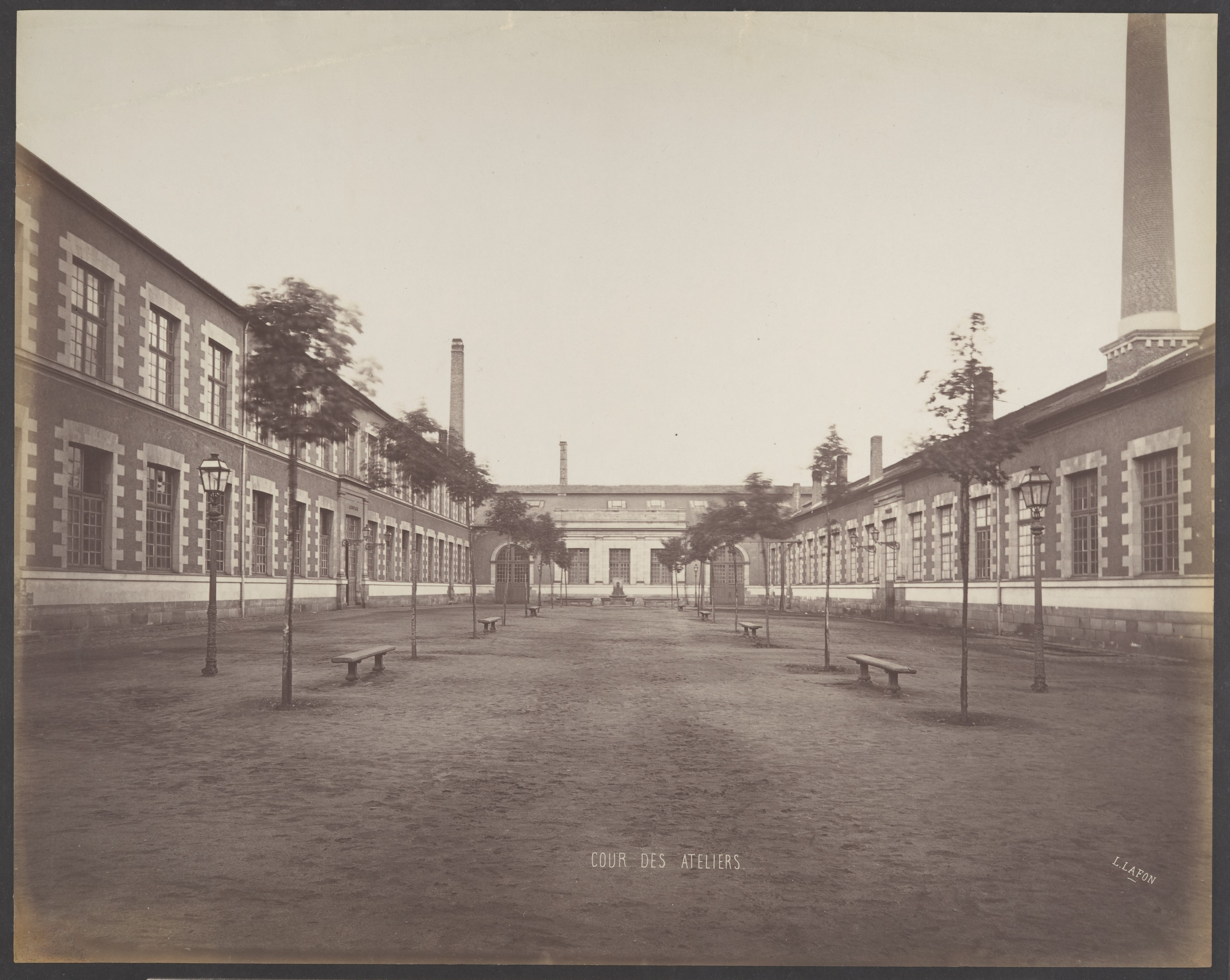
Cour des Ateliers

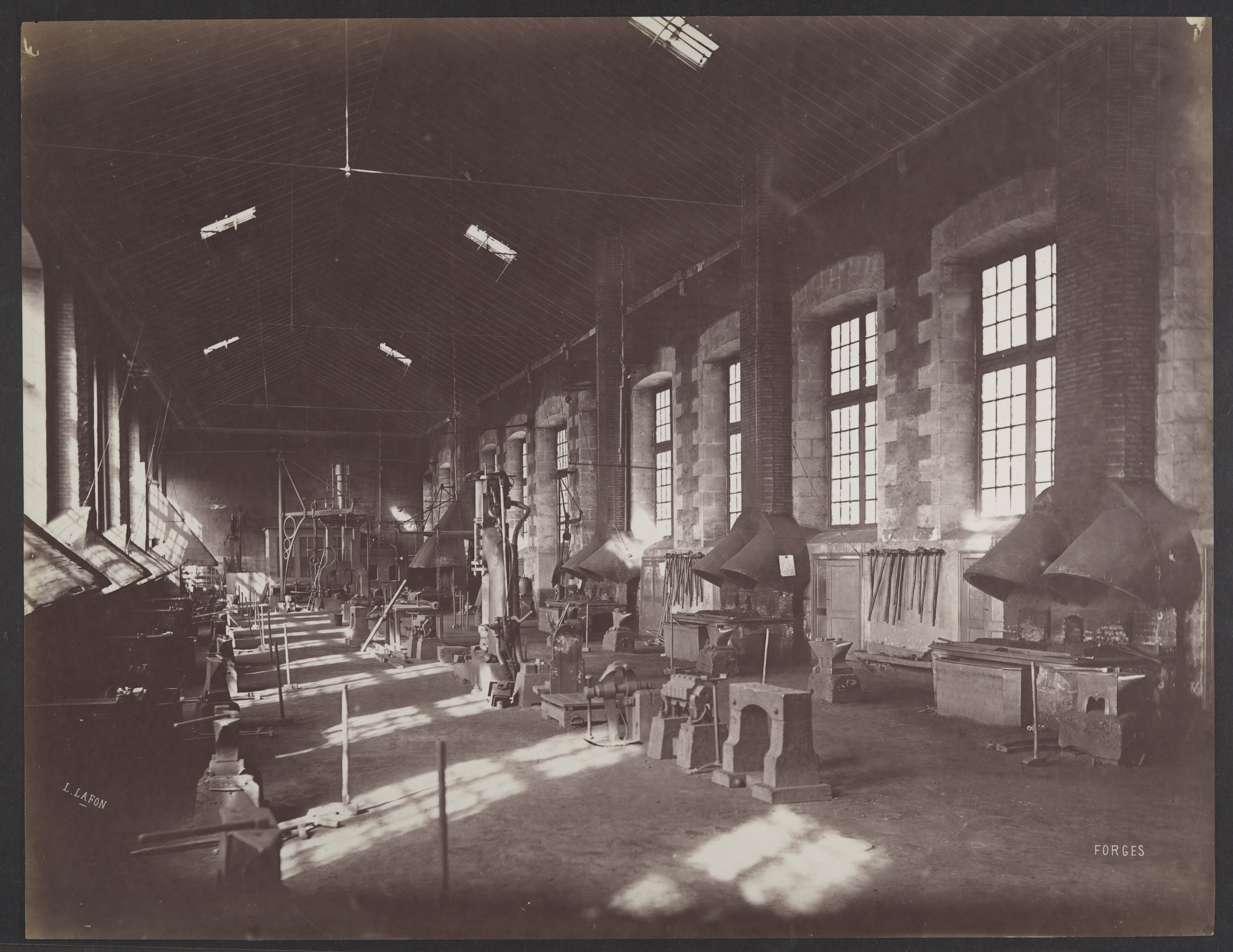
Forges, circa 1880.

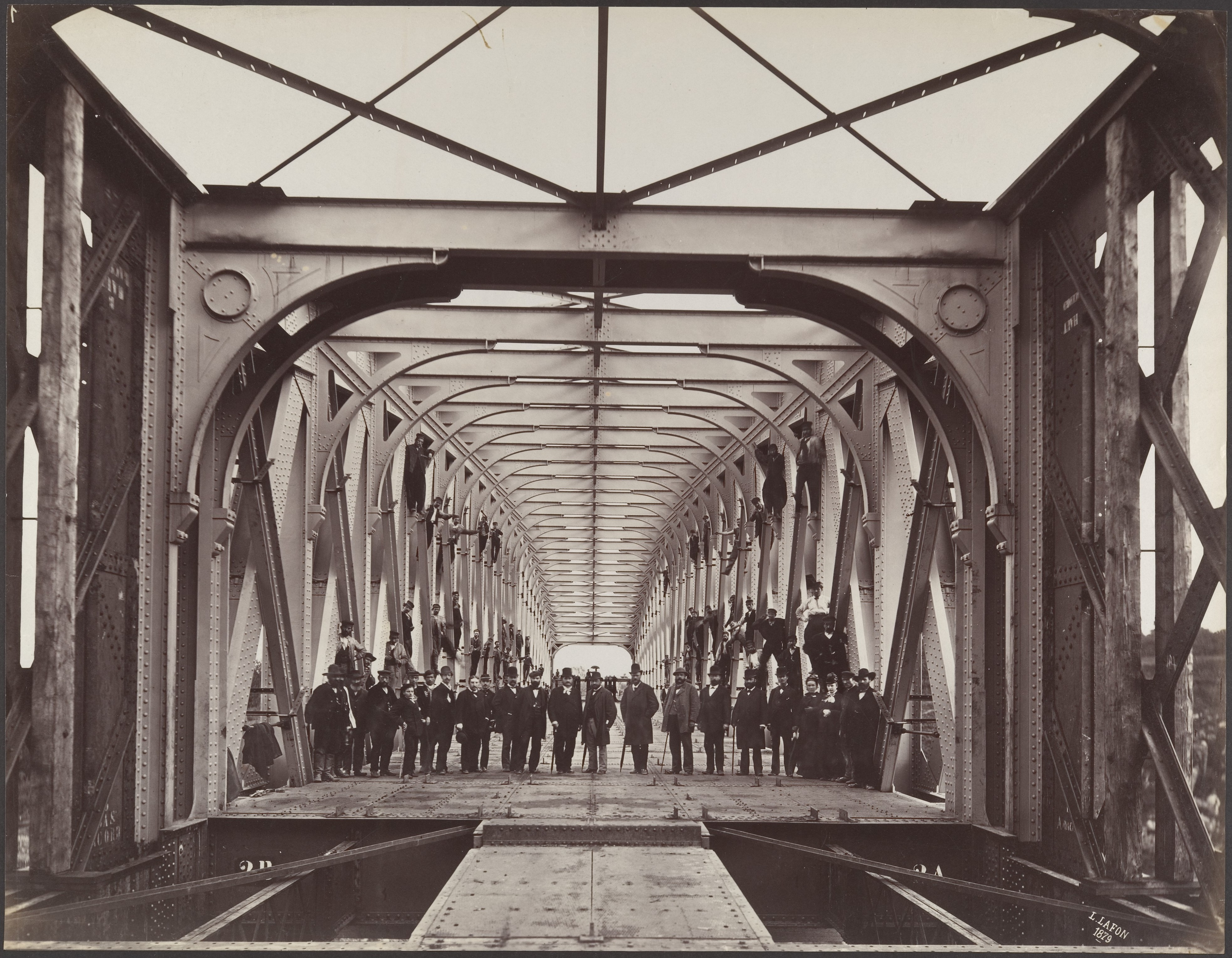
Lessart viaduct on the Rance river. October 1879.

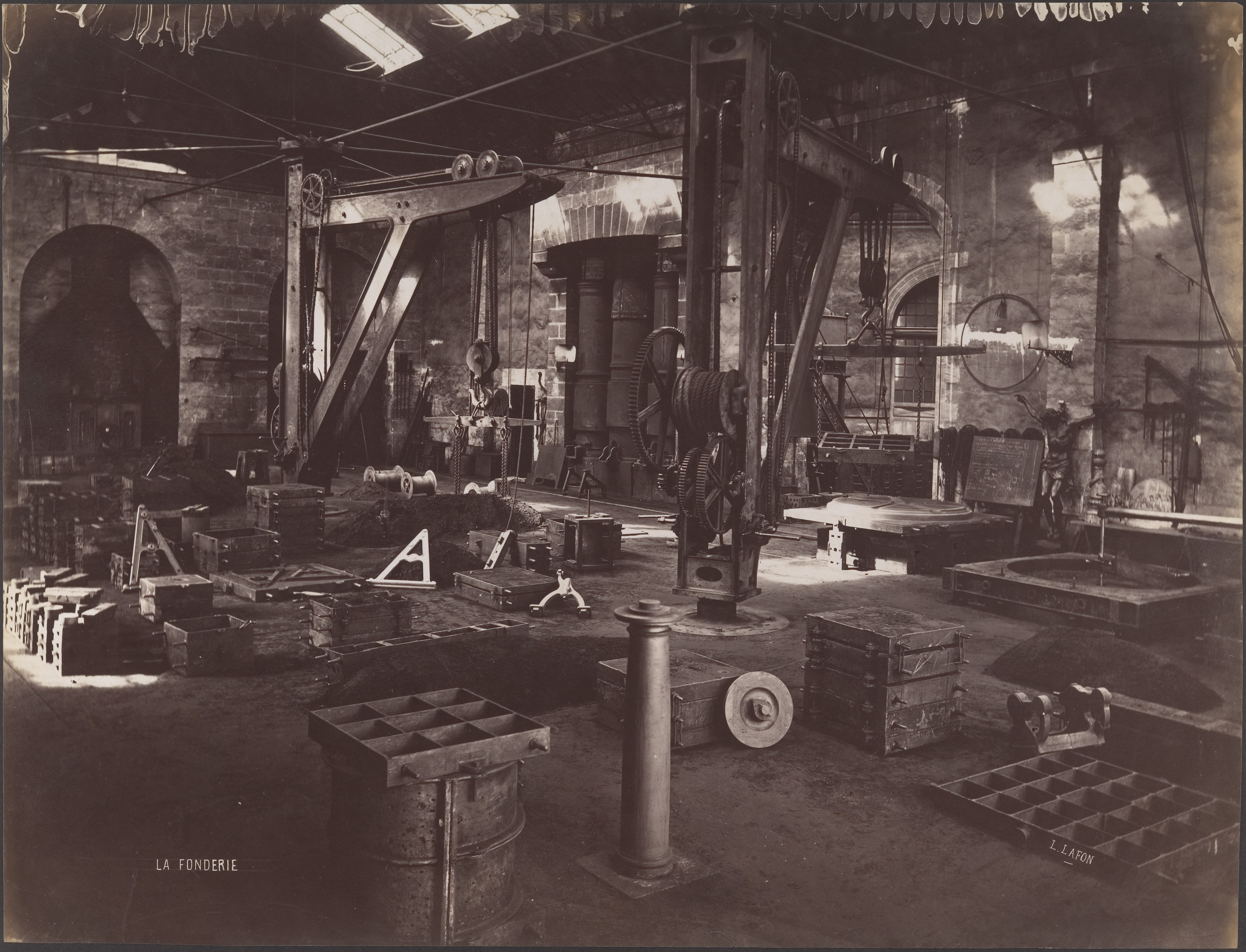
The Foundry

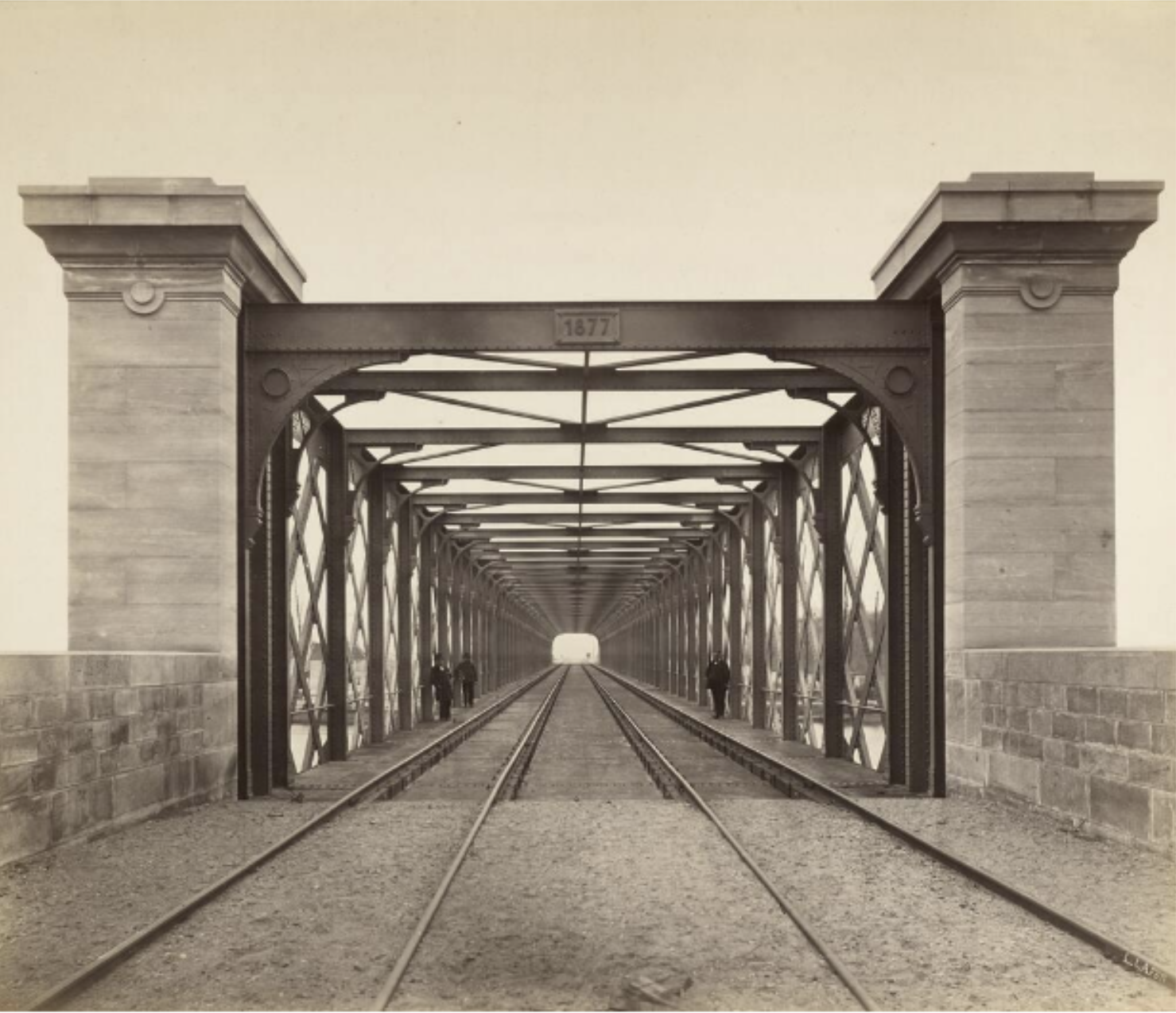
Railroad Viaduct at La Fontaine-des-Eaux, France. C. 1879-1880
