= Birthday Girl =

Birthday Girl may refer to:

- "Birthday Girl" (short story), by Haruki Murakami, 2002
- Birthday Girl (2001 film), an erotic comedy thriller directed by Jez Butterworth
- Birthday Girl (2023 film), a Danish thriller film
- Birthday Girl, a 2002 feature-length TV drama starring Sarah Lancashire
- "Birthday Girl", a 2012 single by Starshell
- "Birthday Girl", a song from the 2008 album Rising Down by The Roots
- "Birthday Girl", a song from the 2022 album Special by Lizzo

== See also ==
- Birthday Boy (disambiguation)
