= What.CD =

Private BitTorrent tracker (2007–2016)

- Website type: BitTorrent tracker
- Available in: English
- Dissolved: November 17, 2016; 9 years ago
- Website: what.cd (defunct)
- Commercial: No
- Launched: October 27, 2007; 18 years ago
- Current status: Defunct

What.CD was a private, invitation-only music BitTorrent tracker and community launched in 2007. The site was shut down on 17 November 2016, after French authorities seized the site's servers.

== History ==
What.CD was founded on the day of Oink's Pink Palace's closure in October 2007. New users could only gain admission through a referral from an existing user, or through a difficult interview process. In November 2007, many site users received a hoax email purporting to be from the Recording Industry Association of America threatening to press charges for illegal downloads.

In 2008, the Canadian Recording Industry Association asked now-defunct Moxie Colo, then What.CD's host, to take down several tracker sites, including What.CD. The company refused, saying, "We will not be following the request and will be fighting for the rights of our clients as—to date—laws in Canada protect them." In October, the site released "The What CD Volume 2", a compilation album of artists that contributed to the site. Earlier that year, the site released Volume One.

In December 2008, What.CD and Open Your Eyes Records formed a partnership in which the record label would exclusively distribute new releases on the tracker.

In 2010, CNET reported that a teenage boy had gained access to playMPE.com, an industry website used by music labels to share music with radio stations, by posing as an Australian music critic. He subsequently uploaded a number of unreleased albums to What.CD. In September 2010, What.CD debuted a new lightweight tracker called "Ocelot". The lightweight tracker used only 3GB of RAM to power over five million peers. In December 2010, What.CD's collection reached one million torrents, a record for a private BitTorrent tracker.

Throughout early 2014, the site was subject to a severe and prolonged DDoS attack, causing intermittent tracker downtime and limiting many of the site's services.

=== Shutdown ===
On 17 November 2016, French authorities seized 12 servers from the internet service provider OVH in the north of France. What.CD announced its closure on its index page later that day, saying, "Due to some recent events, What.CD is shutting down. We are not likely to return any time soon in our current form. All site and user data has been destroyed. So long, and thanks for all the fish."

On 18 November 2016, What.CD issued a statement about its shutdown, stating that its users and staff were safe, thanking all contributors and recommending that donations go to Internet Archive, Electronic Frontier Foundation, La Quadrature du Net and Initiative für Netzfreiheit.

In October 2017, for What.CD's ten-year anniversary, former What.CD staff released a torrent containing the last backup of all non-user data from the site, saying that this message would "likely be the last".

== Leaks ==
The Radiohead song "These Are My Twisted Words" was uploaded to the tracker on 12 August 2009. Fans speculated the song had been leaked by the band itself and contained hints to an upcoming EP entitled Wall of Ice. The song was released on 17 August 2009, on the band's website, similar to their release of In Rainbows.

In 2009, Microsoft's forensic tool, Computer Online Forensic Evidence Extractor (COFEE), was leaked on the site. Administrators later removed the software. The What.CD staff said of the removal: "Suddenly, we were forced to take a real look at the program, its source, and the potential impact on the site and security of our users and staff. And when we did, we didn't like what came of it. So, a decision was made. The torrent was removed (and it is not to be uploaded here again)."

On 28 November 2013, a What.CD user uploaded scans of three unpublished stories by American author J. D. Salinger, including The Ocean Full of Bowling Balls. Similar to the response to the COFEE upload, an administrator removed the torrent.
