= Papyrus 54 =

Papyrus 𝔓^{54}
- New Testament manuscript
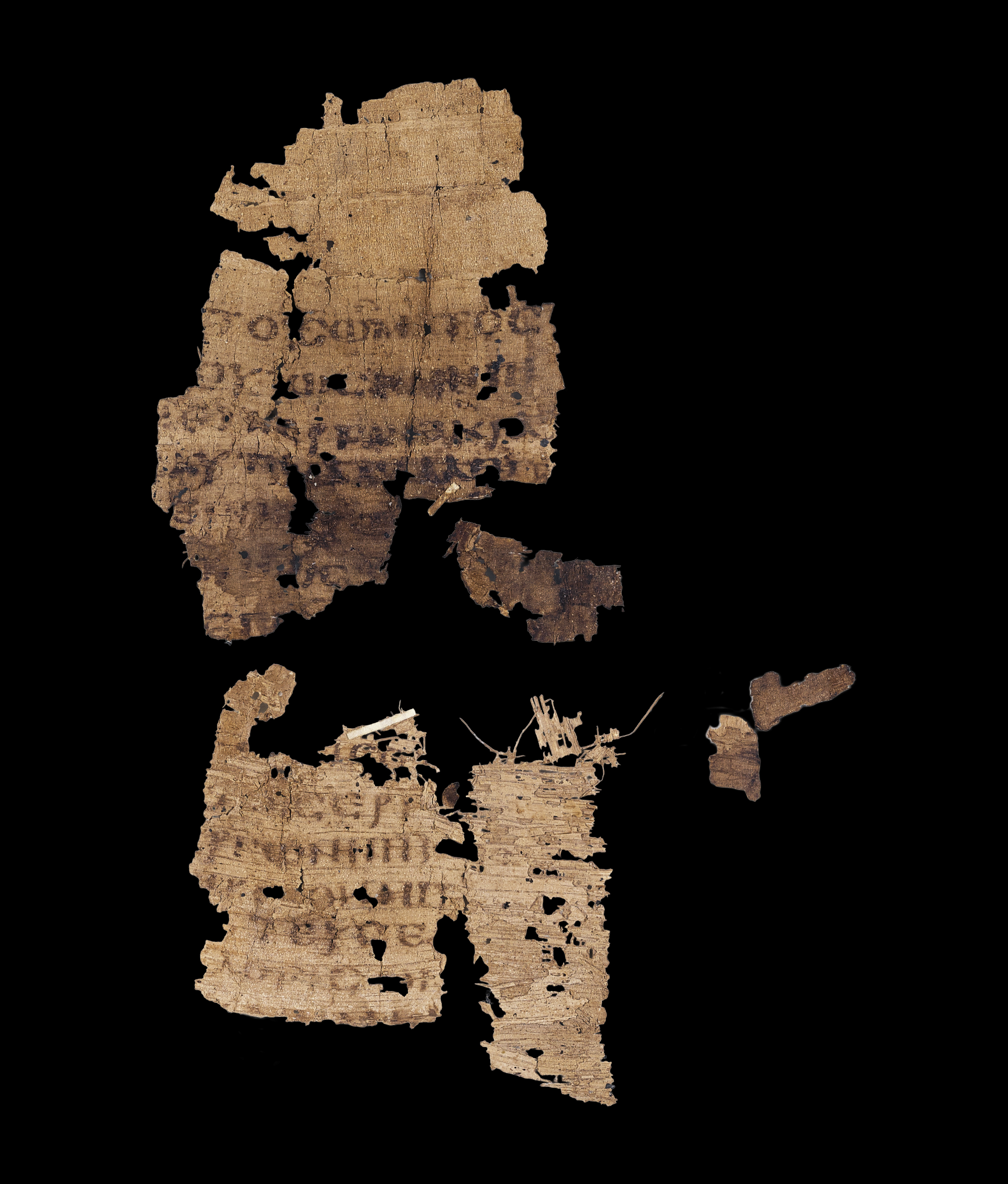
- Recto James 2:16-18, 22, 24-25
- Name: P. Princeton
- Text: Epistle of James 2; 3 †
- Date: 5th / 6th century
- Script: Greek
- Found: Egypt
- Now at: Princeton University Library
- Cite: E. H. Kase, Papyrus in the Princeton University Collections II (Princeton: 1936), pp. 1-3.
- Size: 8.7 x 6.5 cm
- Type: Alexandrian text-type
- Category: III/II

Papyrus 54 (in the Gregory-Aland numbering), designated by siglum 𝔓^{54}, is an early copy of the New Testament in Greek. The manuscript palaeographically has been assigned to the 5th century (or 6th century).

It is a papyrus manuscript of the Epistle of James, it contains only fragments of James 2:16-18.22-26; 3:2-4.

The Greek text of this codex is a representative of the Alexandrian text-type. Aland placed it, with some hesitation, in Category III (possibly II).

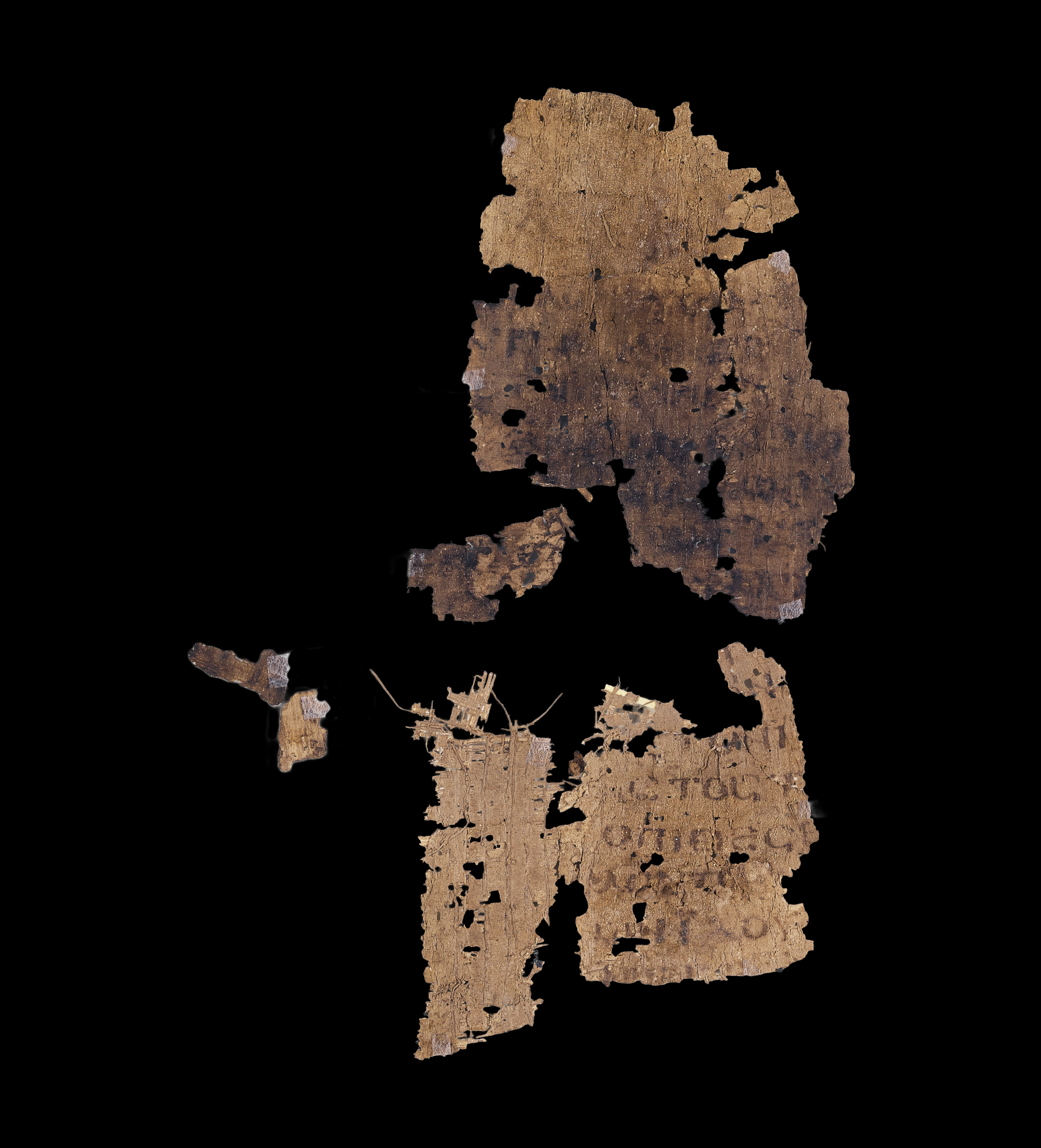
Verso James 3:2-4

It is currently housed at the Princeton University Library (P. Princ. 15; earlier Garrett Depots 7742) in Princeton, New Jersey.

== See also ==
- James 2; James 3
- List of New Testament papyri
- Princeton Papyri

== Images ==
- 𝔓^{54} at the Princeton University Library Papyrus
