= The Ocean Full of Bowling Balls =

Unpublished work by J.D. Salinger

"The Ocean Full of Bowling Balls" is an unpublished work by J. D. Salinger. It is about the death of Kenneth Caulfield, who later became the character Allie in The Catcher in the Rye.

== History ==
The story was initially going to appear in Harper's Bazaar, but Salinger withdrew the story before publication. This story is available in the Princeton University Library Special Collections Department's Story Magazine and Story Press Records (C0104). Per the terms of Salinger's donation of the manuscript to Princeton University, it cannot be published until 50 years after his death; thus, the earliest it can be published is January 27, 2060. In November 2013, the manuscript of "The Ocean Full of Bowling Balls" was leaked to the general public, and made available online on the website what.cd.

According to Jack Sublette in his 1984 annotated bibliography of J. D. Salinger, Collier's fiction editor Knox Burger stated in 1948 that "Ocean Full of Bowling Balls" "contains the greatest letter home from camp ever composed by man or boy." The letter referred to is sent from Holden Caulfield (later the protagonist of The Catcher in the Rye) to his younger brother in this story, Kenneth.

"The Ocean Full of Bowling Balls", along with the short stories "Birthday Boy" and "Paula", was printed in a small edition titled Three Stories, reportedly in 1999, a copy of which was sold on eBay and then posted on internet file sharing sites in late November 2013.
