= Oink's Pink Palace =

Defunct BitTorrent tracker and music sharing community website

- Oink.cd frontpage (logged in) on 18 October 2007
- Website type: Private BitTorrent tracker
- Owner: Alan Ellis (aka Oink)
- Creator: Oink (Modified TBSource)
- Revenue: Voluntary donations
- Website: OiNK.cd or OiNK.me.uk
- Registration: Free, Invitation only
- Launched: 30 May 2004
- Current status: Tracker forcibly shut down

Oink's Pink Palace (frequently stylized as OiNK) was a prominent BitTorrent tracker which operated from 2004 to 2007. Following a two-year investigation by the International Federation of the Phonographic Industry (IFPI) and the British Phonographic Industry (BPI), the site was shut down on 23 October 2007, by British and Dutch police agencies. These music industry organisations described OiNK as an "online pirate pre-release music club", whereas former users described it as one of the world's largest and most meticulously maintained online music repositories. About a month before the shut-down, music magazine Blender elected OiNK's creator, British software engineer Alan Ellis, to their The Powergeek 25 – the Most Influential People in Online Music list. Alan Ellis was tried for conspiracy to defraud at Teesside Crown Court, the first person in the UK to be prosecuted for illegal file-sharing, and found not guilty on 15 January 2010.

== Background ==
Oink's Pink Palace was launched in 2004. OiNK was an invitation-only BitTorrent community, with about 180,000 members. When closed by the authorities, the site had stored about 200,000 torrent files. One of OiNK's rules was that users could not pay to gain membership to the site, but had an opportunity to donate money to the site. Members were required to maintain minimum upload-to-download ratios, and to have cute avatars.

OiNK placed an emphasis on the sharing of torrents for high-quality MP3 and lossless audio formats such as FLAC, along with other formats such as Ogg Vorbis and M4A. Torrents for E-books, computer software, and e-learning videos were also routinely shared amongst OiNK's users.

== Shut-down and media response ==
OiNK's main page immediately after closure

Following a joint operation codenamed Operation Ark Royal, between Interpol, the International Federation of the Phonographic Industry (IFPI), the British Phonographic Industry (BPI), and some other organisations, on 23 October 2007 the site was closed. The site's creator, Alan Ellis, was arrested by British police, and Dutch police confiscated OiNK's hosting service company NForce's servers. The e-mail addresses of the site's members were not encrypted and were therefore available to the authorities; however, members' passwords were only stored as a salted md5 hash. Data stored on OiNK's servers was insufficient to incriminate OiNK users.

Jeremy Banks, head of the IFPI's Internet Anti-Piracy Unit, opined that OiNK was central to the illegal distribution of pre-release music, and that the site had leaked over 60 major album releases in 2007. The shut-down was covered in media worldwide mainly based on IFPI, BPI and Cleveland Police's press releases and original BBC news footage of the arrest of Ellis.

The British and Dutch Pirate Parties issued a joint statement condemning the actions as retaliatory, questioning the ethics of choreographing it and letting representatives of the alleged victims participate in the investigation.

In the days following the arrest, when news sources like Wired, The Guardian, and Slyck.com started fact checking based on internet sources, it was revealed that not everything reported in the mainstream media was entirely correct. Common errors quoted by media were: that OiNK was an extremely lucrative website and made hundreds of thousands of pounds from "donations", which users had to pay to be able to download; that users had to offer new content to the site in order to get invitations; and that the site was centered around the release of pre-released material. The first two claims clearly conflicted with the site's written rules and conventions. A counterargument for the third was that only a tiny portion of the site's content was pre-released material. TechCrunch wrote that while links to pre-release albums definitely appeared on OiNK early it was unlikely that the site's members were actually responsible for these releases and claim this shows how poorly the scene is understood.

After OiNK was raided, several new BitTorrent Trackers were set up by former members of the site, What.cd being the most notable.

=== Legal proceedings ===
Between 23 and 28 May 2008 six former members were arrested and questioned, but released on bail without being charged.

On 12 September 2008 five of the six members of OiNK who had previously been arrested were charged with copyright infringement. The sixth, OiNK's administrator Alan Ellis, had bail extended four times until 10 September 2008, when he was finally charged with conspiracy to defraud. A hearing was held at a magistrates' court on 24 September 2008.

On 24 September Ellis's case, along with the case of one of the former OiNK members charged with copyright infringement, were referred to Teesside Crown Court sitting at Middlesbrough, with the next hearing scheduled for 2 October 2008 but the conspiracy to defraud case was adjourned until 14 November 2008 at Teesside Crown Court. It was then adjourned again until 12 December, then 23 March 2009, then 15 May 2009, and once again until 25 September 2009.

In December 2008 four of the former OiNK members pleaded guilty at Teesside Crown Court, where they were charged with copyright infringement offences. Three were sentenced to a total of 330 hours of community service and court costs of £378 each; the other fined £500. A further defendant, also charged with a copyright infringement offence, pleaded not guilty and was set for trial along with the administrator of the site, Alan Ellis.

On 15 January 2010 Ellis was found not guilty of conspiracy to defraud, with the jury returning a unanimous verdict. Ellis was represented by Morgan Rose, with Alex Stein as the barrister.

The CPS took the decision to continue the prosecution against the final OiNK defendant, Matthew Wyatt, despite their failure to secure a conviction against Ellis. The matter was due to proceed to trial but, at the eleventh hour, the CPS decided to drop the case entirely. Commentary at the time suggested that this was in an effort to shield the International Federation of the Phonographic Industry and the British Phonographic Industry from explaining the methods by which they secured the evidence against Wyatt, as well as the practices of the music industry in general.

== Notable users ==
OiNK's user-base included several musicians, most notably Trent Reznor, founder of Nine Inch Nails. In a 2007 interview, Reznor said "I'll admit I had an account there and frequented it quite often. At the end of the day, what made Oink a great place was that it was like the world's greatest record store. Pretty much anything you could ever imagine, it was there, and it was there in the format you wanted. If Oink cost anything, I would certainly have paid, but there isn't the equivalent of that in the retail space right now." Of the site's members, Reznor opined, "They're not stealing it because they're going to make money off of it; they're stealing it because they love the band." Reznor also criticised legal music download sites such as iTunes, due to "DRM, low bit rate, etc." Reznor later worked for legal music services Beats Music and then Apple Music, saying of the latter "It’s kind of a miracle to think that a device in your pocket can play pretty much any song that the world has ever created."
