= Love Lockdown =

2008 single by Kanye West

- Cover art for the digital and CD releases of "Love Lockdown"

Single by Kanye West

from the album 808s & Heartbreak
- Released: September 18, 2008
- Recorded: September 2008
- Studio: Glenwood (Burbank, California); Avex Recording (Honolulu, Hawaii)
- Genre: Electropop
- Length: 4:30 (album version); 3:55 (radio edit)
- Label: Roc-A-Fella; Def Jam
- Songwriters: Kanye West; Jeffrey "Jeff" Bhasker; Jenny-Bea Englishman; Malik Jones; LaNeah Menzies
- Producer: Kanye West

Kanye West singles chronology
"Stay Up! (Viagra)" (2008)	"Love Lockdown" (2008)	"Heartless" (2008)

Music video
- "Love Lockdown" on YouTube

"Love Lockdown" is a song by American rapper Kanye West from his fourth studio album, 808s & Heartbreak (2008). The song was produced by West, while co-produced by Jeff Bhasker. The producers co-wrote it with Esthero, Malik Yusef, and Starshell. West initially shared the song via his blog on September 10, 2008, before re-recording it after negative reactions. The song was later released for digital download on September 18, 2008 by Roc-A-Fella and Def Jam as the lead single from the album. An electropop song, its instrumentation relies on piano and Roland TR-808 drumbeats.

West sings through Auto-Tune on the song, with the lyrics looking at a failed relationship's after effects. "Love Lockdown" received widely positive reviews from music critics, many of whom complimented the production. Some directed praise towards the drums in the production, while numerous critics highlighted West's vocal performance on the song. It was named to year-end lists for 2008 by multiple publications, including Pitchfork and Blender. The song won the award of Best Rap/Hip Hop Dance Track at the 2009 International Dance Music Awards. On the US Billboard Hot 100, it became West's highest debut by entering at number three on the chart. The song also reached the top 10 in Canada, Denmark, Germany, Ireland, the Netherlands, and the United Kingdom.

"Love Lockdown" has been certified quadruple platinum and platinum in the United States and the UK by the Recording Industry Association of America (RIAA) and British Phonographic Industry (BPI), respectively. An accompanying music video premiered on October 7, 2008. The video replicates the role of Christian Bale in the American film American Psycho (2000), with West making his appearance in his own apartment while all colour has been removed from the rooms. In 2008, Time listed the visual as their Video of the Year.

West first performed the song live at the 2008 MTV Video Music Awards, taking influence from the 2008 Summer Olympics' opening ceremony for the performance. He later performed it on multiple occasions, including at the Coachella Valley Music and Arts Festival and Hollywood Bowl in 2011 and 2015, respectively. The song was used for Grand Theft Auto's standalone video game compilation, Grand Theft Auto: Episodes from Liberty City (2009). Cover versions of it were performed by Glass Animals and Lorde in 2014 and 2018, respectively. A remix 12" vinyl was released in November 2008 for "Love Lockdown", which included remixes done by Chew Fu and Jake Trothn, among others.

== Background and recording ==
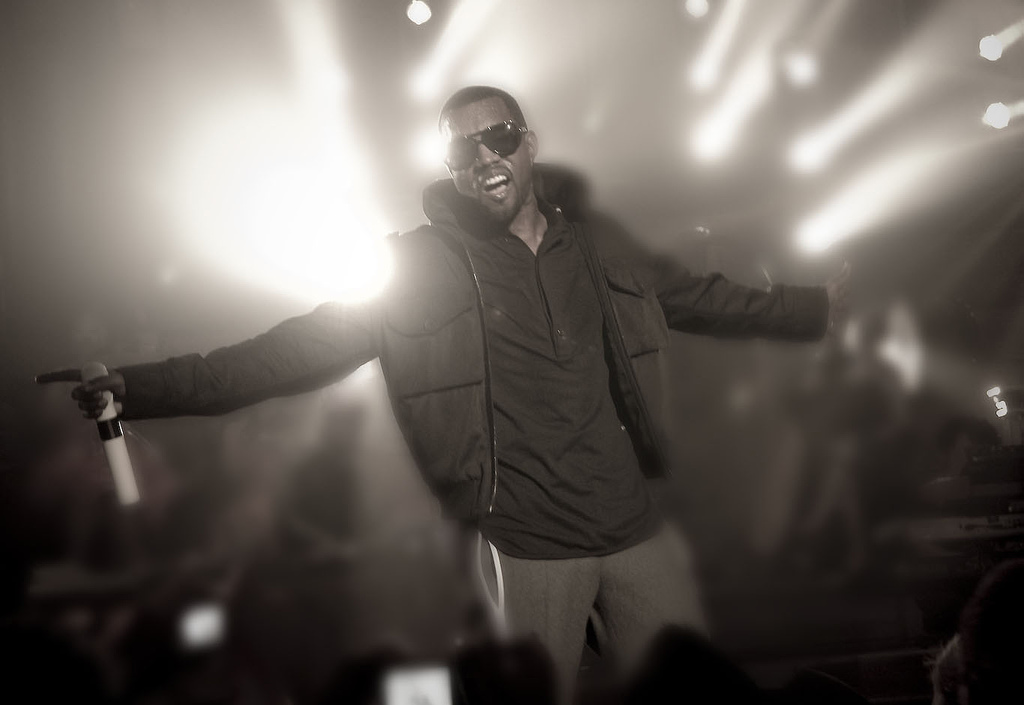
After the success of West's third studio album Graduation in 2007, he said that "Love Lockdown" was one of the first two tracks he crafted after entering "album mode".

Around the time of West's third studio album Graduation being released in September 2007, American record producer Jeff Bhasker started to play keyboards for West's band due to them needing someone to fill in. Originally, Bhasker met West through the rapper's DJ A-Trak and was trying to increase name recognition for himself as a producer by working with West; Bhasker called him "awesome". He contributed writing to multiple songs on 808s & Heartbreak, including "Love Lockdown", which was co-written by West, Esthero, Malik Yusef, and Starshell. Bhasker recalled that all of the songwriters "deciphered what" was being said on the song's demo, shortly after it had been freestyled in full by West. According to Bhasker, the writers helped fill in the words when deciphering West's demo and he admitted collaborators are needed "that understand songwriting to make the song as good as it can be, even if its not like, 'Okay, let's try this melody or that melody.'" West produced the song, while co-production was handled by Bhasker. After she accidentally met West in the hallway of a recording studio, Starshell participated in a songwriting session. During the session, the track was written. Starshell later expressed feelings of gladness that she had worked with West, since gathering the experience early in her career helped her understand how the music business works. She explained, stating: "In this industry, it's about networking and relationships."

Inspired by 1980s synthpop icons such as Phil Collins, Gary Numan and Boy George for the material on 808s & Heartbreak, West considered the tracks to be more minimal and functional due to him making usage of the Roland TR-808 drum machine. West stated his intention was to juxtapose the mechanical sounds of the Auto-Tune and 808s with the more traditional sounds of taiko drums and choir monks. "Love Lockdown" was premiered live by West at the 2008 MTV Video Music Awards on September 7. Two days later, West admitted via his blog that the song was his favorite to date at the time and had been written a week and a half before the premiere. In an interview with Kiss FM, West revealed that it was one of the first two tracks created by him once he went "into album mode" after the success of Graduation. On September 10, 2008, West shared the song through his blog. The shared version was met with generally negative responses from fans of West, including an Underwriter blog critic that heavily appreciated his previous works. Replying to his fans, West confirmed via his blog that the song was being re-recorded: "Your prayers have been answered! There's a new version of 'Love Lockdown' coming." Simultaneously, West revealed that he "re-sung it" and the song was being mastered while telling those who do not like Auto-Tune it is "too bad" because he loves the effect and has been using it since his debut studio album The College Dropout (2004); "Love Lockdown" was ultimately released as a single on September 18, 2008. The cover art for the single features PostScript's Type 4 font, which West described as "perfected" to please all the "design snobs, lol". On September 25, 2008, West posted six stems for the song to his blog, each featuring isolated song portions of "Love Lockdown", and the stems were used to enable fans to remix the song. The stems included an a cappella, distorted vocals, the piano, and the outro synth-beat. West went on to name "Love Lockdown" as an example of him creating a track "that people never heard before".

== Composition and lyrics ==
"Love Lockdown"
A 28-second sample of "Love Lockdown", which features a synth pulse and West attempting to decide whether he should stay or go prior to drums coming in. The chorus is led by "thundering" tribal taiko drums, while it also contains hand claps and "a stampede" of percussion that Gibi Zé Bruno, Lula Almeida, and Rodney Dassis contributed. West uses the chorus to sing his exhortion to "keep your love locked down", representing a man leaving a love interest for protection of his heart.

Musically, "Love Lockdown" is an electropop song. According to the sheet music published at Musicnotes.com, the song is set in the time signature of common time. "Love Lockdown" is composed in the key of C♯ minor with a quick tempo of 120 beats per minute (BPM) and West's vocal range spans two octaves, going from a low of G♯_{2} to a high of G♯_{4}. The song is written in a verse-chorus form that expresses quiet-loud dynamics, featuring verses delivered in a low, somber tone before shifting into loud, chanting choruses. The track is built around sharp piano and "harsh" Roland TR-808 drumbeats, the latter of which emulate a human heartbeat. The song commences with a heartbeat-like low tone bass, which was described as "melodic". Prior to the drums of the song, a synth pulse is featured. For going against the typical sound of a hip hop beat, along with the Roland TR-808, the track instead makes use of "thundering" tribal taiko drums in its chorus' instrumentation that accompany West's vocals. The chorus also contains hand claps and heavy percussion, the latter of which was contributed by Gibi Zé Bruno, Lula Almeida, and Rodney Dassis. Military drums are included in the song, accompanied by a house piano riff. West does not rap at all on the song, with him singing for the entirety of it. Auto-Tune is used on West's voice throughout, being accompanied by somber keys for much of the song. West sings through a voice synthesizer, while strangled squeals are also included in the song.

The song contains introspective lyrics, in which West discusses the after effects of a failed romantic relationship. Before the chorus of the song, West demonstrates trying to make the decision between staying and going. In the chorus, West fully suggests to "keep your love locked down". The chorus' lyrics represent a man moving on from someone he loves, as this will protect his heart. Certain lyrics of the song are used by West to portray a struggle to properly show love; the lyrics were described by PopMatters as "simplistic, succinct and powerful".

== Release ==
On September 18, 2008, "Love Lockdown" was released for digital download in various countries as the lead single from 808s & Heartbreak by West's record labels Roc-A-Fella and Def Jam. The song was serviced to US rhythmic contemporary radio stations on September 30, 2008. West blogged that he considered the song making it to radio to be a triumph. On October 18, 2008, a CD single was released for the song in various countries.

A 12" vinyl was later released for the song across Europe on November 11, 2008. The vinyl features remixes by Aero Tronic, Chew Fu, and Flufftronix on the A-side, while the B-side includes the instrumental of the song, a remix by Jake Trothn, and the song's main mix. An Essential 5 EP for the song was released for digital download in Germany on November 18, 2008. Six days later, West's fourth studio album 808s & Heartbreak was released, including "Love Lockdown" as the fifth track on the album.

== Critical reception ==
Professional ratings
Review scores
Source	Rating
BBC	4/5 stars
Digital Spy	3/5 stars
The Observer	4/5 stars

"Love Lockdown" was met with widely positive reviews from music critics, who generally praised the production and West's vocals. In his review of the song for BBC, Fraser McAlpine glorified the "remarkable" production that "would still be great" if "literally" any contemporary music artist was put over it, and he highlighted the "frantic martial drumming". McAlpine approved West "attempting to sing" despite being a rapper by calling his attempt "automatically impressive" and explained West "left his comfort zone" by doing so, with him concluding that West is "probably not as much of a genius as he thinks he is" but is "trying, and this should be applauded" despite West sounding somewhat similar to Jamaican-American rapper Sean Kingston. Comparing "Love Lockdown" to the version of the song West originally shared, Gareth Grundy of The Observer commented that the "synthesized vocal and shuffling drums" had been "quickly beefed up", which added "drama to what was previously a dirge". Writing for PopMatters, Dave Heaton analyzed the song as starting "with a heartbeat-like bass tone that manages to be melodic" despite not having a heavy presence and lauded West's vocals, noting that he "at one point goes into a brief robot scream". He continued, directing praise towards the song's piano melody and "high-powered drums", admitting that the latter "kick the song up a thousand notches".

Chris Richards from The Washington Post said that the rhythm of the track "feels particularly vivid", with him opining that West's "scorned" performance alongside "a stampede of percussion" is "as thrilling as it is melancholy". The Sunday Times' Dan Cairns stated West shows "an emotional candour of such a personal nature" on the track that listening to it "can seem almost voyeuristic". Jon Caramanica of The New York Times wrote that the track's "thunderous drums cut through an electro haze", which he viewed as suggesting West's "old, oversize sound". Jody Rosen from Rolling Stone highlighted the track for being "powered by thundering tribal drums", while describing West's vocals as sliding "from digitized trills into strangled squeals". Scott Plagenhoef was less positive in Pitchfork, citing "the clapping drums" of the track as being one of the album's sonic highlights and calling it a "very good" song that does "work surprisingly well on the car radio", though he pointed the track out as a "second-tier" single from West. Reviewing for Digital Spy, Nick Levine praised the Taiko drums of the track and observed "a house piano riff" as well as "military-style drums", though called the result "unsettling" and "a little bit paranoid". He elaborated, branding the song "much less radio-friendly" in comparison to West's singles "Stronger" (2007) and "Homecoming" (2008); Levine concluded by labeling "Love Lockdown" an "interesting experiment" but wondered why West would "want to turn himself into a barely adequate singer?"

=== Accolades ===
"Love Lockdown" appeared on year-end lists for 2008 of multiple publications. The song was named the 41st best single of the year by laut.de, while Pitchfork listed it as the 39th best track and Mike Powell of the publication called the song West's "most deceptively ambitious" piece of music. On Blender's list of the top songs from 2008 to download, the track was ranked at number 21. PopMatters listed the track as the 10th best single of the year, with the magazine's Josh Timmermann admitting it "isn't quite a pop-cultural event" like other songs by rappers while calling the track "a weirder, moodier, more personal creation" and citing it as proof "that Kanye the AutoTune Soul Man is yet another force to reckon with, in addition to Kanye the Rapper and Kanye the Super-Producer". "Love Lockdown" was voted 9th on The Village Voice's Pazz & Jop poll for 2008 with 38 mentions; 37 of them were for the single version of it. The track's best achievement was being named by Time as the best song of the year.

For the 2014 issue of XXL that was in celebration of 40 years of hip hop, the magazine selected the track as one of the five best singles of 2008. The track is included in the 2015 edition of Robert Dimery's book 1001 Songs You Must Hear Before You Die. It was awarded Best Rap/Hip Hop Dance Track at the 2009 International Dance Music Awards, alongside receiving a nomination for Best R&B/Urban Dance Track at the ceremony. The track was nominated for the Viewer's Choice Award at the 2009 BET Awards, ultimately losing to fellow rapper T.I.'s single "Live Your Life". At the 2009 Teen Choice Awards, "Love Lockdown" received a nomination for Choice Music: R&B Track.

== Music video ==
=== Background ===
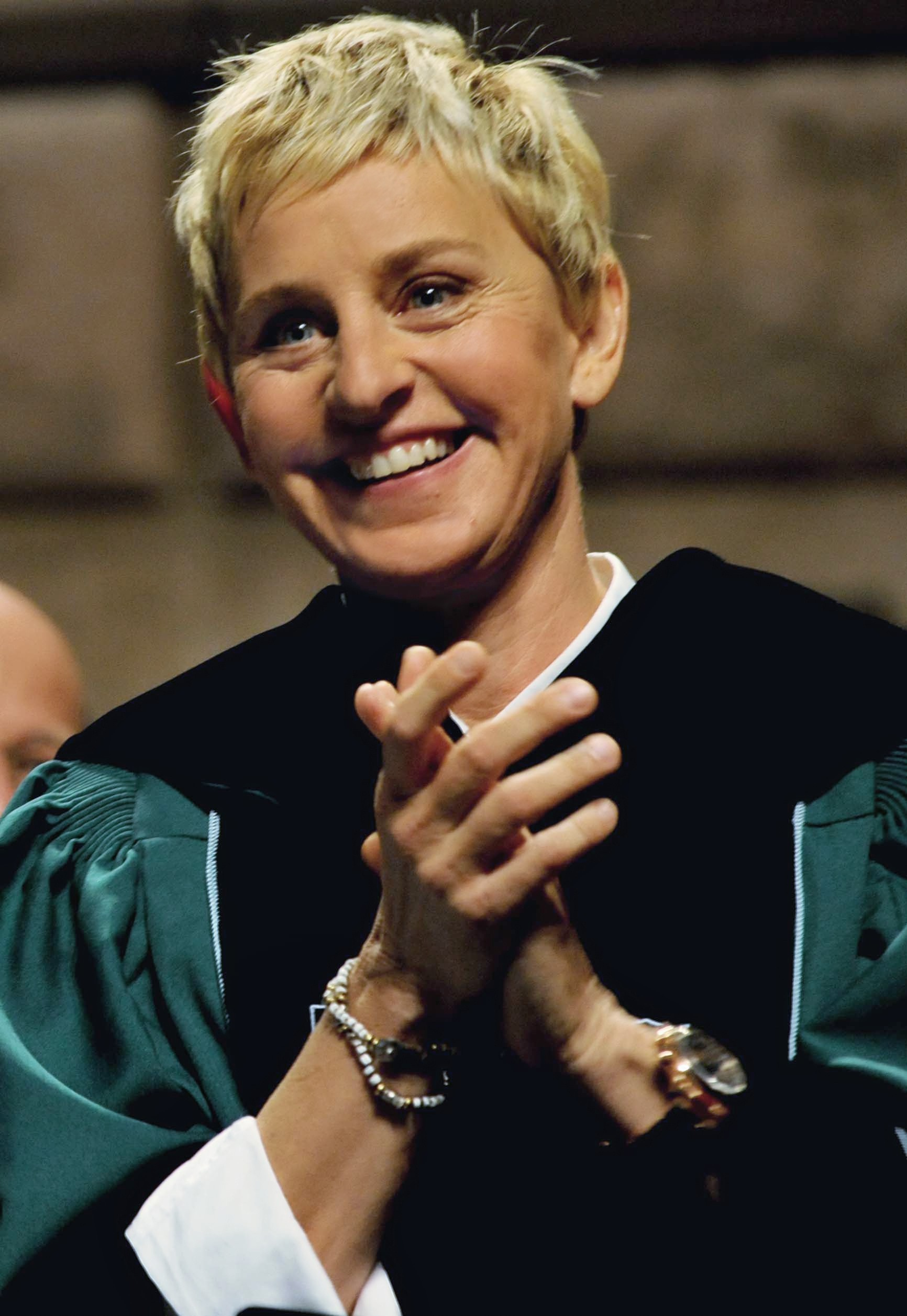
West debuted an accompanying music video on The Ellen DeGeneres Show in October 2008, detailing its inspiration from the 2000 film American Psycho to Ellen DeGeneres.

On October 7, 2008, the music video for "Love Lockdown" premiered exclusively on The Ellen DeGeneres Show. West admitted to Ellen DeGeneres that he based parts of the video on actor Christian Bale's portrayal of the murderer character Patrick Bateman from the 2000 film adaptation of the novel American Psycho (1991), saying he does "kind of embody" Bateman. Recalling the end of the film where Bateman "didn't really kill anyone", West expressed admiration for "the clean aesthetic and the way he was all about labels", concluding by stating that he "wanted to express all of that in the video". Following the premiere, DeGeneres deemed the visual "brilliant" and it was subsequently posted on her website.

=== Synopsis and reception ===
The music video is mostly set in West's real life apartment, with him being dressed in white while appearing in the apartment. For paying homage to Bale's role in American Psycho, the rooms were treated to remove all colour. West unhappily moves around the apartment, not looking into the camera until two minutes into the video. During the song's choruses, African dancers and drummers appear, beating on djembe drums to the Roland TR-808 drumbeats of song. Simultaneously, African tribe members are present, who run wildly and head into battle. Two women eventually increase their vividness, becoming some of the dominant characters. West later sits against the wall as the camera starts shaking.

Time named the music video as their Video of the Year for 2008. At the 2009 MTV Video Music Awards, the visual received nominations for the awards of Video of the Year, Best Male Video and Best Hip-Hop Video.

=== Credits and personnel ===
Credits adapted from The Inspiration Room.

Filming

- Produced by HSI London
- Edited at The Whitehouse Post, London
- Post-production by Prime Focus London

Personnel

- Simon Henwood – director
- Hagai Shaham – director
- Jonathan Sela – director of photography
- Richard LaSelle – production designer
- Nicki Allix – editor
- Josephine Simon-Mogensen – post-production
- Dan Lorenzini – post-production
- James Maclachlan – post-production
- Chris Chitty – post-production
- Adam Crocker – post-production
- Richard Watson – post-production
- Duncan Russell – post-production
- Tom Russell – post-production

== Commercial performance ==
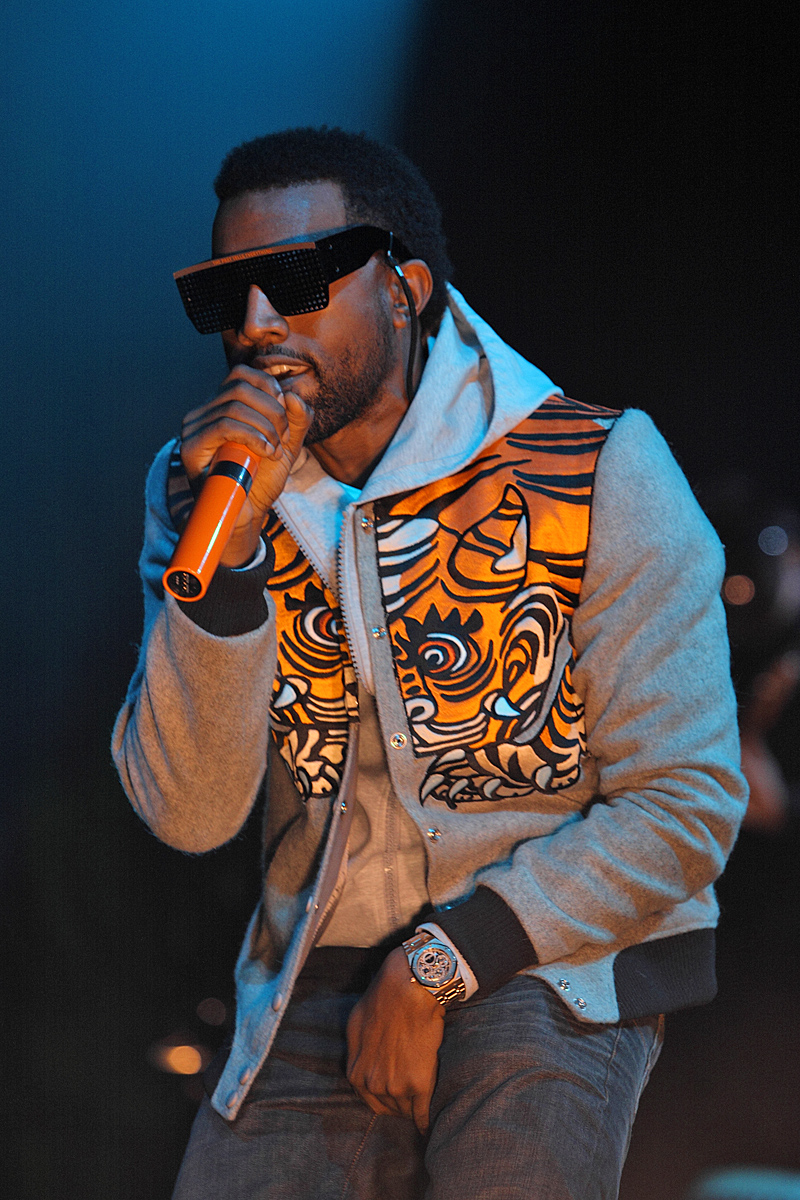
The song's debut at number three on the US Billboard Hot 100 broke the previous record for West's highest entry on the chart, set by the single "Swagga Like Us" earlier in 2008.

On the US Billboard Hot 100, the song opened at number three for the issue date of September 29, 2008, with first-week digital sales of 213,000. The song became West's highest debuting single on the chart, surpassing his previous record of entering at number five with "Swagga Like Us" one week prior. "Love Lockdown" also became West's sixth entry as a solo artist on the Hot 100 and his third highest charting single as a lead artist, behind "Gold Digger" (2005) and "Stronger. The song experienced the second highest debut of 2008 on the chart, tying with David Cook's "The Time of My Life". On the Hot 100, "Love Lockdown" also became the 10th song of the 2000s decade to debut in the top three. However, the song was the second entry in the top three of the chart by any artist unaffiliated with American Idol. As of May 31, 2018, the song stands as West's ninth biggest hit of all time on the Hot 100.

The song entered at number 13 on the US Pop 100 for the issue dated October 4, 2008 and remained at the same position the following week. For the issue date of December 20, 2008, the song reached the top 10 at the closing position, rising from number 12 the previous week. It eventually peaked at number eight on the Pop 100 on the chart issue dated January 10, 2009. The song was the 24th most downloaded single of 2008 in the United States, with digital sales of 1,863,000. By July 2011, the song had surpassed digital sales of 3,000,000 in the US. This made it the fifth track to do so that includes West, while the song became his fourth track as a lead artist to surpass the sales amount in the country. On September 23, 2020, "Love Lockdown" was certified quadruple platinum by the Recording Industry Association of America (RIAA) for pushing 4,000,000 certified units in the US.

On the Canadian Hot 100, "Love Lockdown" debuted and peaked at number five. The song debuted at number 30 on the New Zealand Singles Chart for the issue dated September 29, 2008, though departed the chart for a week before re-entering at number 29. It climbed the New Zealand Singles Chart during the succeeding four weeks, going on to peak at number 11 on the November 10, 2008 chart issue. On January 12, 2009, "Love Lockdown" was certified gold by Recorded Music NZ (RMNZ) in its 15th week on the chart for sales of over 7,500 units in the country. In Australia, the song opened at number 37 on the ARIA Singles Chart dated October 5, 2008. Later that same month, it reached number 39 on the chart and remained in the top 40 for 13 consecutive weeks prior to peaking at number 18 for the week of January 25, 2009. The song lasted for 23 weeks on the ARIA Singles Chart. By February 16, 2009, the song had been certified gold by the Australian Recording Industry Association (ARIA) for exceeding 35,000 shipped copies in Australia.

The song peaked at number four in Denmark and Ireland on the Danish Top 40 and Irish Singles Chart, respectively. On the German Singles Chart, "Love Lockdown" debuted at number eight, becoming West's first top 10 single in Germany as a lead artist. In the United Kingdom, the song debuted at number 84 on the UK Singles Chart for the issue dated September 21, 2008. The following week, the song rose 68 places to number 16 on the chart. It later peaked at number eight on the UK Singles Chart for the issue date of October 26, 2008. The song remained at the same position for two consecutive weeks and lasted for a total of 26 weeks on the chart. As of April 17, 2017, "Love Lockdown" stands as the 90th biggest hip-hop song of all time in the UK. It ranks as West's 19th most successful track of all time on the UK Singles Chart up to August 5, 2021. On October 18, 2024, the song was certified platinum by the British Phonographic Industry (BPI) for selling 600,000 units in the UK. It further charted at number 10 and 11 in the Netherlands and Sweden on the Dutch Single Top 100 and Sverigetopplistan charts, respectively. The song also reached the top 20 on Norway's Topp 20 Singles chart, the Billboard European Hot 100 Singles chart, Austria's Ö3 Austria Top 40, the Switzerland Singles Top 75, and the Official Finnish Singles Chart.

== Live performances ==
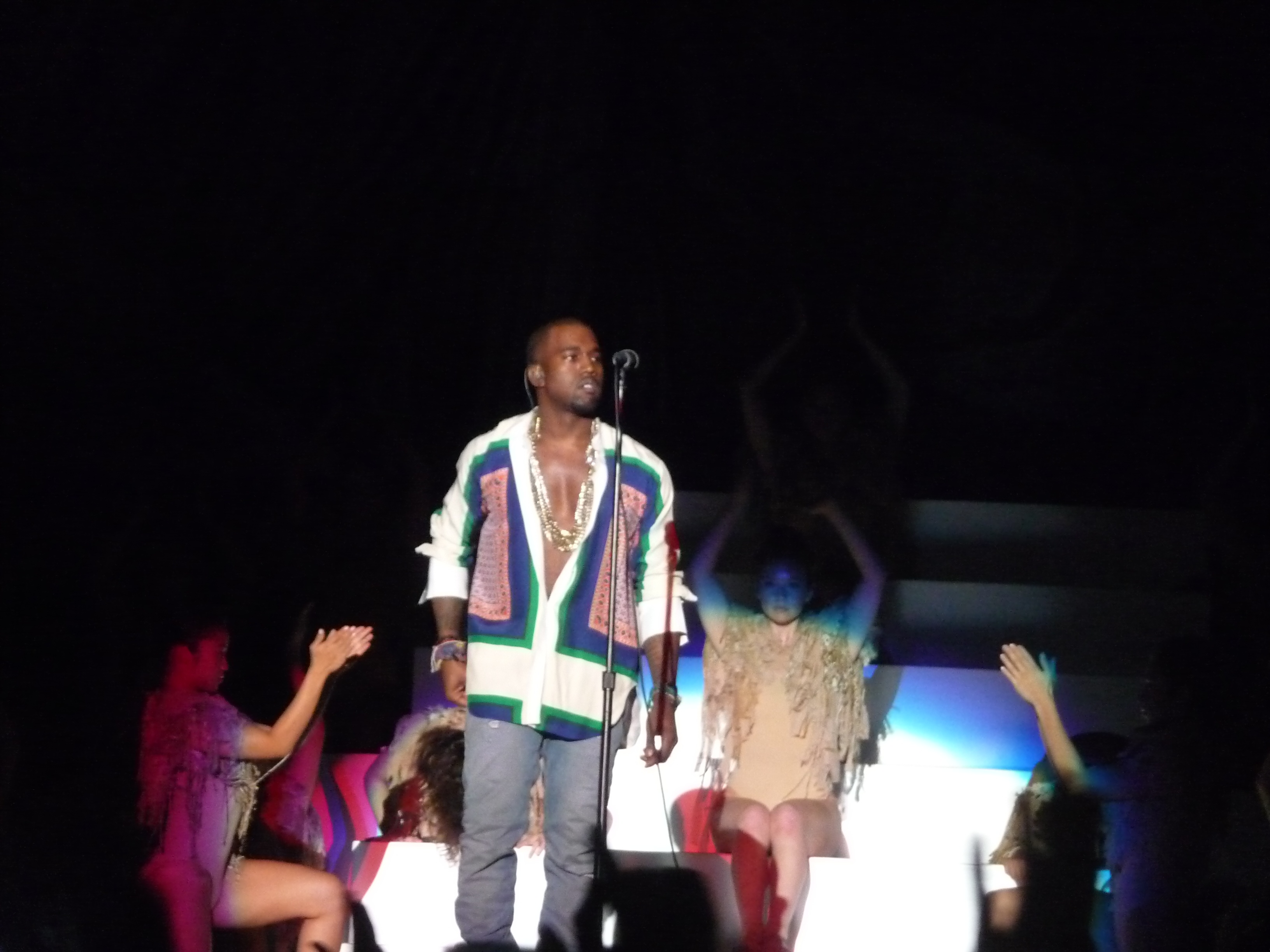
West performed the song live with an instrumental intro at the 2011 Coachella Valley Music and Arts Festival.

West first performed "Love Lockdown" live at the 2008 MTV Video Music Awards, with the performance closing the show. The performance was noted for taking influence from the opening ceremony of the 2008 Summer Olympics and saw West singing a version of the song through Auto-Tune that featured a deep bassline, a simple piano riff used to emphasize his vocal melody, and a beat delivered for the chorus by a series of marching drummers. On October 14, 2008, West performed the song on Jimmy Kimmel Live! while wearing a Sonny Crockett outfit and sang off-key at points. West started his appearance at the 2008 MTV Europe Music Awards with a performance of the song. He performed it for the Late Show with David Letterman on November 24 of that year, being accompanied by drummers and lights. In 2015, Complex ranked the performance as the 17th best hip hop performance on the show. On December 13, 2008, West performed the song live on Saturday Night Live (SNL) but went silent for the high notes, which were delivered by a piped-in female backup singer.

A rearranged version of "Love Lockdown" was performed by West for his 2010 live album VH1 Storytellers in February 2009, though the performance had not been included for broadcast and was solely made available online. West delivered a performance of the song at the 2011 Coachella Festival, using the Alan Parsons Project's instrumental "Sirius" (1982) as an intro for it. For West's two night concert of 808s in Heartbreak in full at the 2015 Hollywood Bowl, he performed the song as the set's fifth number. This marked West's first time performing the song since October 26, 2013, and saw him wearing loose garments in white and off-white shades. The performance started with a monolithic white background wall that went on to be turned into a two-story-high stairwell by "Broadway-like stagecraft", filled with numerous muscular African-American men who were stripped up to their waists. The men wore white jeans and had chalky white makeup on; they moved from the stage to the crowd for taking strategic positions in the aisles there during the final chorus, after fireworks went off above.

== Appearances in media ==
For episode eight of competitive dance reality TV series America's Best Dance Crew's sixth season, a dance challenge set to the music of West used "Love Lockdown", "All of the Lights" (2010), "Touch the Sky" (2006) and "Gold Digger". I.aM.mE, ICONic Boyz and Phunk Phenomenon, who were the remaining three crews for the episode, performed dances to the singles for the challenge. The episode first aired on May 26, 2011. For the 2009 episodic expansion pack Lost and Damned of the action-adventure game Grand Theft Auto IV (2008), the song was one of the new tracks to be added to the fictional hip hop radio station The Beat 102.7. It is the 14th track on the radio station, with the song being among the tracks presented by DJ Funkmaster Flex for his radio show. The song was featured in the video game compilation Grand Theft Auto: Episodes from Liberty City later in 2009, which contains The Lost and Damned alongside fellow Grand Theft Auto IV episodic expansion pack The Ballad of Gay Tony (2009). A mashup of the song with Metallica's "The Day That Never Comes" (2008) was used for the soundtrack of rhythm video game DJ Hero 2 (2010), with the track listing being revealed on September 22 of that year. The New York compilation album for annual promotional event the Victoria's Secret Fashion Show was released in 2018, featuring "Love Lockdown".

== Other versions ==
Macy Gray covered "Love Lockdown", and it was officially included on her Covered album (2012), though she mixed it with another song Buck from Nina Simone rather than doing a straight cover.

A re-imagined version of the song, titled "Warden", was shared by American rapper Tonedeff on September 29, 2008. On June 24, 2015, American record producer Y2K released his remix of "Love Lockdown" through SoundCloud. The remix features an edited version of West's vocals, which are in a slightly lower pitch compared to the original. It is an upbeat remix, with the beat being prominent.

The song was covered by English post-punk band White Lies for BBC Radio 1's Live Lounge segment on January 22, 2009. On April 3, 2014, psychedelic pop band Glass Animals performed a cover version of the song for Australian radio station Triple J's Like A Version series. The cover maintained the same melody as the original, though featured the band's trademark sound. Glass Animals later performed the cover at other live sets throughout 2014 and also recorded a studio version, which premiered via the Billboard website on July 15. Explaining the cover version, the band's frontman Dave Bayley called the original "so well-written" and highlighted the "incredible" work West did for the song, though recalled that they "thought it could be cool to push it in a different direction". The cover includes Bayley's throat vibrato over moans and handclap, both of which are looped, and was ultimately included on the EP for Glass Animals' single Pools (2014). During New Zealand singer Lorde's concert in West's hometown of Chicago on March 27, 2018 for her Melodrama World Tour (2017–18), she performed an a cappella rendition of the song. The rendition featured Lorde performing a section of the song while she moved around the stage, with the performance lasting for 90 seconds. Lorde said to the crowd at the concert, "It must be nice to come from the same place as Kanye West."

== Track listings ==
Digital download (Note: Open the citations for the United States, Denmark, Canada, the Netherlands, and New Zealand to view this track listing.)

1. "Love Lockdown" – 4:30

Digital download (Note: Open the citations for Israel and Norway to view this track listing.)

1. "Love Lockdown" – 4:31
2. "Flashing Lights" – 3:57

CD single

1. "Love Lockdown" – 4:30
2. "Flashing Lights" (Album Version) – 3:57
3. "Stronger" (A-Trak Remix) – 4:34
4. "Love Lockdown" (Video) – 4:36

EU 12" vinyl Remixes

A-side

1. "Love Lockdown" (Aero Tronic Mix)
2. "Love Lockdown" (Chew Fu Small Room Mix)
3. "Love Lockdown" (Flufftronix Mix)

B-side

1. "Love Lockdown" (Instrumental)
2. "Love Lockdown" (Jake Troth Mix)
3. "Love Lockdown" (Main Mix)

Germany Essential 5 EP

1. "Love Lockdown" – 4:31
2. "Homecoming" (feat. Chris Martin) – 3:23
3. "Stronger" – 5:12
4. "Gold Digger" (feat. Jamie Foxx) – 3:29
5. "Good Life" (feat. T-Pain) – 3:27

== Credits and personnel ==
Information taken from 808s & Heartbreak liner notes.

Recording

- Recorded at Glenwood Studios (Burbank, California) and Avex Recording Studio (Honolulu, Hawaii)

Personnel

- Kanye West – songwriter, producer
- Jeff Bhasker – songwriter, co-producer, keyboards
- Jenny-Bea Englishman – songwriter
- Malik Jones – songwriter
- LaNeah Menzies – songwriter
- Andrew Dawson – recording, mixer
- Gibi Zé Bruno – drums/percussion
- Lula Almeida – drums/percussion
- Rodney Dassis – drums/percussion

== Charts ==
=== Weekly charts ===
Chart performance for "Love Lockdown"
Chart (2008–2009)	Peak position
Australia (ARIA)	18
Austria (Ö3 Austria Top 40)	18
Belgium (Ultratop 50 Flanders)	13
Belgium (Ultratop 50 Wallonia)	38
Canada Hot 100 (Billboard)	5
Canada CHR/Top 40 (Billboard)	13
Canada Hot AC (Billboard)	33
Denmark (Tracklisten)	4
European Hot 100 Singles (Billboard)	16
Finland (Suomen virallinen lista)	20
Germany (GfK)	8
Hungary (Rádiós Top 40)	34
Ireland (IRMA)	4
Italy (FIMI)	33
Mexico Ingles Airplay (Billboard)	44
Netherlands (Dutch Top 40)	13
Netherlands (Single Top 100)	10
New Zealand (Recorded Music NZ)	11
Norway (VG-lista)	14
Russia (Tophit)	94
Scottish Singles Sales (Official Charts)	10
Sweden (Sverigetopplistan)	11
Switzerland (Schweizer Hitparade)	18
UK Singles (Official Charts)	8
UK Hip Hop/R&B (Official Charts)	1
US Billboard Hot 100	3
US Dance Airplay (Billboard)	7
US Dance Club Songs (Billboard)	26
US Hot R&B/Hip-Hop Songs (Billboard)	26
US Pop Airplay (Billboard)	10
US Pop 100 (Billboard)	8
US Rhythmic Airplay (Billboard)	7

=== Year-end charts ===
2008 year-end chart performance for "Love Lockdown"
Chart (2008)	Position
Australia (ARIA)	91
Canada (Canadian Hot 100)	95
UK Singles (OCC)	43
US Billboard Hot 100	74

2009 year-end chart performance for "Love Lockdown"
Chart (2009)	Position
Australia Urban (ARIA)	38
Canada (Canadian Hot 100)	65
Hungary (Rádiós Top 40)	130
UK Singles (OCC)	187
US Billboard Hot 100	44

== Certifications ==
Certifications and sales for "Love Lockdown"
Region	Certification	Certified units/sales
Australia (ARIA)	Gold	35,000^{^}
Denmark (IFPI Danmark)	Gold	7,500^{^}
Germany (BVMI)	Gold	150,000^{‡}
New Zealand (RMNZ)	Platinum	30,000^{‡}
United Kingdom (BPI)	Platinum	600,000^{‡}
United States (RIAA)	4× Platinum	4,000,000^{‡}
^{^} Shipments figures based on certification alone.^{‡} Sales+streaming figures based on certification alone.

== Release history ==
Release dates and formats for "Love Lockdown"
Region	Date	Format	Version	Label(s)	Ref.
Various	September 18, 2008	Digital download (Note: Both digital downloads for the original version of "Love Lockdown" were released simultaneously.)	Original	Roc-A-Fella; Def Jam	
United States	September 30, 2008	Rhythmic contemporary radio	Original	Roc-A-Fella; Def Jam	
Various	October 18, 2008	CD single	Original	Roc-A-Fella; Def Jam	
Europe	November 11, 2008	12" vinyl	Remixes	Roc-A-Fella; Def Jam	
Germany	November 18, 2008	Digital download	Essential 5 EP	Roc-A-Fella; Def Jam	

== Bibliography ==
- Bailey, Julius (2014). The Cultural Impact of Kanye West. Palgrave Macmillan. ISBN 978-1-137-57425-1.
