= Starshell =

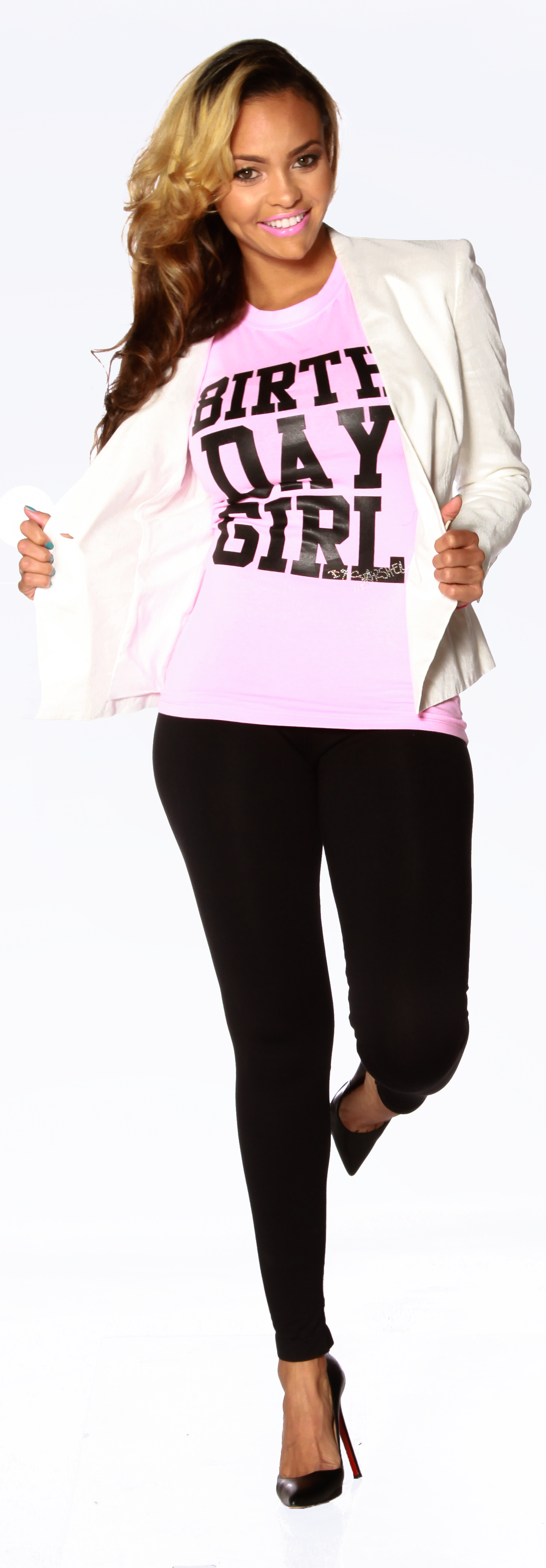

Background information
- Born: LaNeah Menzies; May 27, 1988 (age 38); Lowell, Massachusetts
- Genres: R&B; pop; hip hop; dance
- Occupations: Singer-songwriter; model; actress
- Instrument: Vocals
- Years active: 2009–present
- Labels: Matriarch; Interscope; Streamline
- Website: starshellworld.com birthdaygirlworld.com

LaNeah Menzies (born May 27, 1983), known professionally as Starshell, is an American actress, songwriter, social entrepreneur, and recording artist.

== Life and career ==
Menzies was born to African-American and Brazilian parents and was raised in Lowell, Massachusetts.

Menzies began her career as a child actress and model. As a teenager, she pursued her music career and, soon after college, signed to Universal Music Group's Interscope Records Matriarch Record company. She co-penned "Love Lockdown" for rapper Kanye West, which debuted at number three on the U.S. Billboard Hot 100 and went on to sell over three million copies. In 2009, she co-penned "I Can See in Color" and "Closer" for Mary J. Blige. The former was featured in the Oscar-nominated film, Precious, while the latter is featured on Blige's album, Stronger with Each Tear. Menzies's first single, "Superluva", produced by Fernando Garibay and written by Menzies and Nire Alldai, was released in the summer of 2010. The single was followed by a retro-pop remix version produced by DJ Cassidy, entitled "Superluva" (Cass & Dubs Remix).

In the summer of 2012, Menzies toured with Jennifer Lopez and Enrique Iglesias on their Dance Again World Tour, as well as on Mary J. Blige and D'Angelo's Liberation Tour with her second single, and pop hit, "Birthday Girl". Birthday Girl debuted via iTunes on February 7, 2012. Menzies's clothing line, Birthday Girl, consisting of a wide range of basics and was launched in 2013 with the help of Kickstarter. She also appeared in Law and Order: Special Victims Unit, Season 14, Episode 16: 'Funny Valentine' in February 2013.

== Causes ==
In June 2013, Menzies partnered with the American Foundation for Suicide Prevention (AFSP) to raise awareness about suicide and suicide prevention. She was announced as the national spokesperson for the Foundation at AFSP's annual Overnight Walk.

== Discography ==
=== Singles ===
Year	Single	Peak chart positions	Album	
Year	Single	R&B	Album	
2010	"Superluva"		TBA	
2012	"Birthday Girl"		TBA	TBA
2013	"My Star"			TBA

=== Film ===
Year	Title	Role	Notes
2015	November Rule	Erica	
