= Birthday Boy (short story) =

"Birthday Boy" is an unpublished short story by J. D. Salinger.

== Plot ==
The story concerns a woman named Miss Collins visiting her fiancé Ray at the hospital. Ray is being treated for an alcohol-induced illness, and when she enters, he pleads for a drink. When she denies his request he becomes enraged and gropes her.

== History ==
Salinger references this story as late as 1951 in letters, but its date of completion was actually 1946. According to notes available on the manuscript found in the Harry Ransom Center, as well as the correspondence to his literary agent at the time, Dorothy Olding, he intended to sell the story to one of the "slicks" to acquire some financial security after he returned from his military service.

“Birthday Boy”, along with the stories “The Ocean Full of Bowling Balls” and “Paula”, was printed in a small run titled "Three Stories", reportedly in 1999, and posted to the Internet in late November, 2013.

This story is considered to be the same story titled "The Male Goodbye" in some instances.
