= The Big To-Do =

Studio album by Drive-By Truckers
- Released: March 16, 2010
- Recorded: 2009
- Genre: Alternative country; country
- Length: 53:39
- Label: ATO
- Producer: David Barbe

Drive-By Truckers chronology
The Fine Print: A Collection of Oddities and Rarities (2009)	The Big To-Do (2010)	Go-Go Boots (2011)

Professional ratings
Aggregate scores
Source	Rating
AnyDecentMusic?	7.4/10
Metacritic	78/100
Review scores
Source	Rating
AllMusic	4/5 stars
The A.V. Club	A−
Entertainment Weekly	A−
The Guardian	3/5 stars
The Independent	4/5 stars
Los Angeles Times	3/4 stars
NME	7/10
Pitchfork	7.4/10
Rolling Stone	3.5/5 stars
Spin	7/10

The Big To-Do is the eighth studio album by American rock band Drive-By Truckers, released on March 16, 2010. It is their first album released on ATO Records, which they signed to after completing their four-album deal with New West Records.

== Background ==
The Big To-Do marks the seventh Drive-By Truckers album produced by David Barbe. The addition of keyboardist Jay Gonzalez to the band's line-up (though he played on the band's second live album) further differentiates this album from its predecessors, and showcases the influence Tom Petty and the Heartbreakers (specifically Benmont Tench) have had on the band.

The Big To-Do was recorded over three blocks of sessions in 2009 (ten days in January, five days in March, and ten days in May) resulting in 25 songs. The band decided to split these tracks between The Big To-Do and its follow-up Go-Go Boots. The album had been mixed, mastered, and completely done before Cooley wrote "Birthday Boy," which was quickly recorded, mixed, and inserted into The Big To-Do.

Bandmember Patterson Hood said that The Big To-Do is "very much a rock album. Very melodic and more rocking than anything since disc 2 of Southern Rock Opera." Hood also states in the album's liner notes that The Big To-Do was not written or recorded with a specific concept in mind (unlike many of the band's earlier albums). The recurring images of the circus, Hood explains, are analogous to "rock shows." While most of the Drive-By Trucker's albums have chronicled the Southern past, The Big To-Do is written entirely about the present. Hood and Cooley's respective songs "This Fucking Job" and "Get Downtown," describe from different points of view the current floundering economy (and are argued by Grant Alden to be the band's most political songs since "The Living Bubba").

Guitarist Mike Cooley commented on the development of the album, explaining that because he didn't have many songs to contribute when the band started working on the album, he decided to focus on "being a player on everybody else's songs while still trying to come up with my own thing." Cooley's hook of a riff in "That Wig He Made Her Wear" exemplifies this statement. He continued by saying that, for him, the turning points in creating the album were working on the songs "You Got Another" and "The Flying Wallendas."

== Track listing ==
No.	Title	Writer(s)	Length
1.	"Daddy Learned to Fly"	Hood	4:44
2.	"The Fourth Night of My Drinking"	Hood	4:45
3.	"Birthday Boy"	Cooley	3:36
4.	"Drag the Lake Charlie"	Hood	3:17
5.	"The Wig He Made Her Wear"	Hood	5:47
6.	"You Got Another"	Tucker	5:18
7.	"This Fucking Job"	Hood	4:58
8.	"Get Downtown"	Cooley	3:13
9.	"Girls Who Smoke (Vinyl Only Bonus Track)"	Hood	2:58
10.	"After the Scene Dies"	Hood	4:07
11.	"(It's Gonna Be) I Told You So"	Tucker	2:03
12.	"Santa Fe"	Hood	3:26
13.	"The Flying Wallendas"	Hood	5:16
14.	"Eyes Like Glue"	Cooley	3:16
Total length:			53:39

== Personnel ==
- Patterson Hood – guitar, vocals
- Mike Cooley – guitar, vocals
- Brad Morgan – drums
- Shonna Tucker – bass, vocals
- John Neff – guitar, pedal steel
- Jay Gonzalez – keyboards, backing vocals
- David Barbe – guitar, keyboards

== Charts ==
Chart (2010)	Peak position
Belgian Albums (Ultratop Flanders)	83
Greek Albums (IFPI Greece)	27
Norwegian Albums (VG-lista)	23
Swedish Albums (Sverigetopplistan)	31
UK Albums (OCC)	61
US Billboard 200	22
US Independent Albums (Billboard)	1
US Top Rock Albums (Billboard)	6
US Top Tastemaker Albums (Billboard)	5
