= Princeton University Library =

Main library of the university

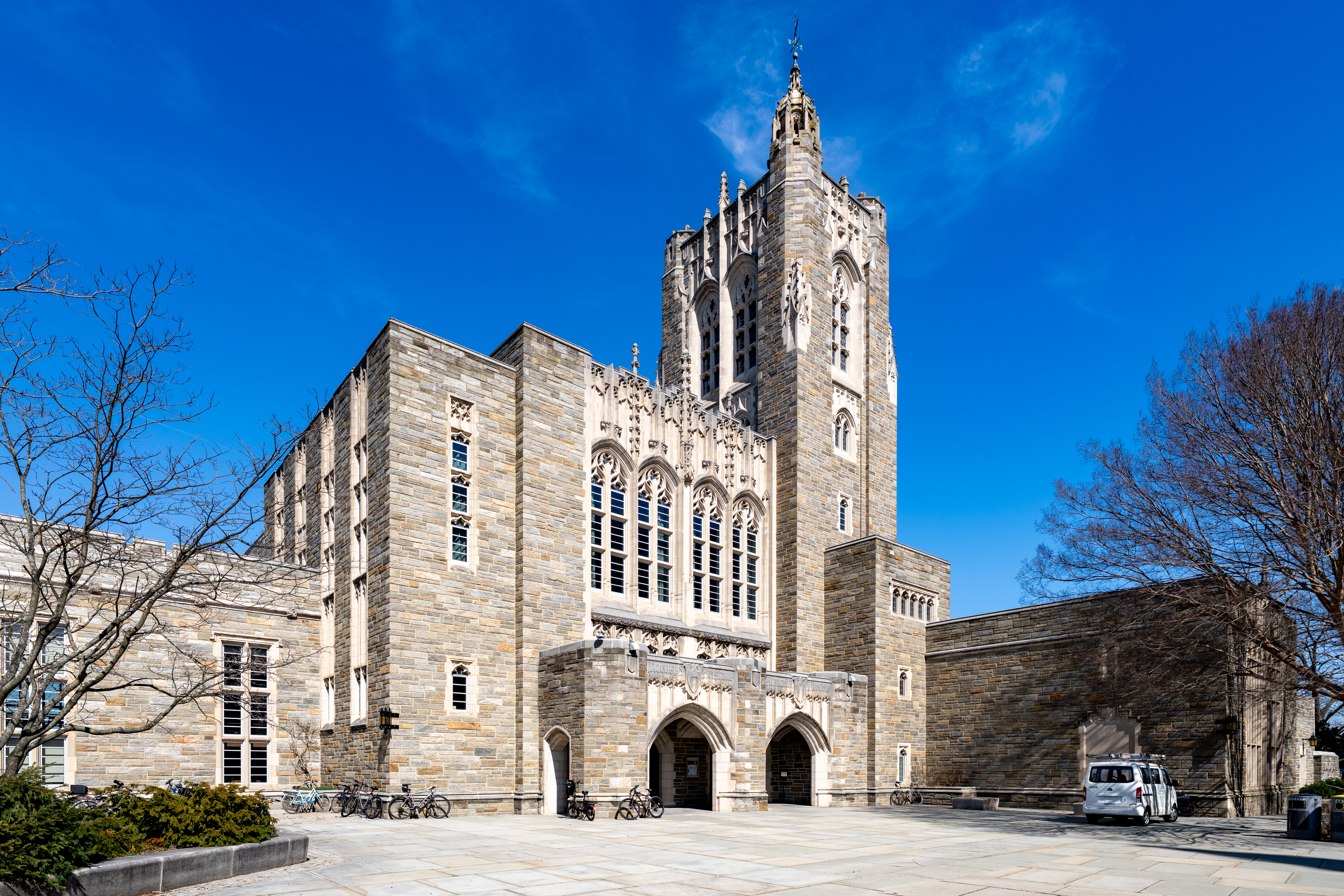
- Location: Princeton, New Jersey, United States
- Type: Academic library system
- Branches: 10

Collection
- Size: 7.3 million volumes, 83,000 serial titles, 6.7 million microforms, 49,000 linear feet of manuscripts (ARL Stats 2011)

Other information
- Director: Anne Jarvis
- Employees: 375 (FTE)
- Website: http://library.princeton.edu/
- Firestone Library
- U.S. Historic district – Contributing property
- Location within Mercer County, New Jersey
- Location: 1 Washington Road, Princeton, NJ
- Coordinates: 40°20′57.9″N 74°39′26.9″W
- Built: 1948
- Architects: Robert B. O'Connor and Walter H. Kilham Jr.
- Architectural style: Collegiate Gothic
- Part of: Princeton Historic District (ID75001143)
- Designated CP: 27 June 1975

Princeton University Library is the main library system of Princeton University. With holdings of more than 7 million books, 6 million microforms, and 48,000 linear feet of manuscripts, it is among the largest libraries in the world by number of volumes. The main headquarters of the university system is the Harvey S. Firestone Memorial Library building, named after tire magnate Harvey Firestone. Additionally, Princeton is part of the Research Collections and Preservation Consortium (ReCAP) along with Columbia Libraries, Harvard Library, Yale University Library, and New York Public Library.

== Firestone Library ==
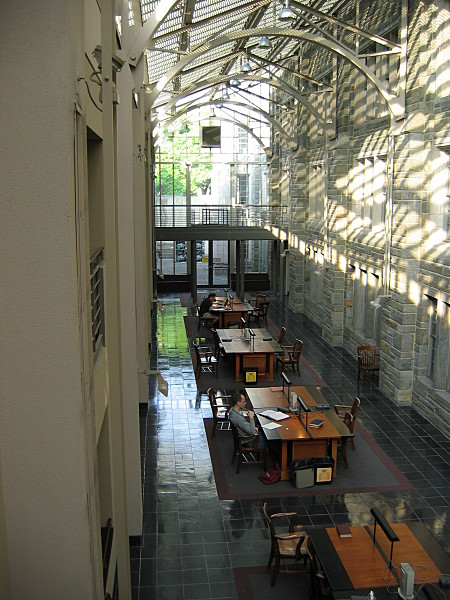
Interior of Firestone Library before renovation

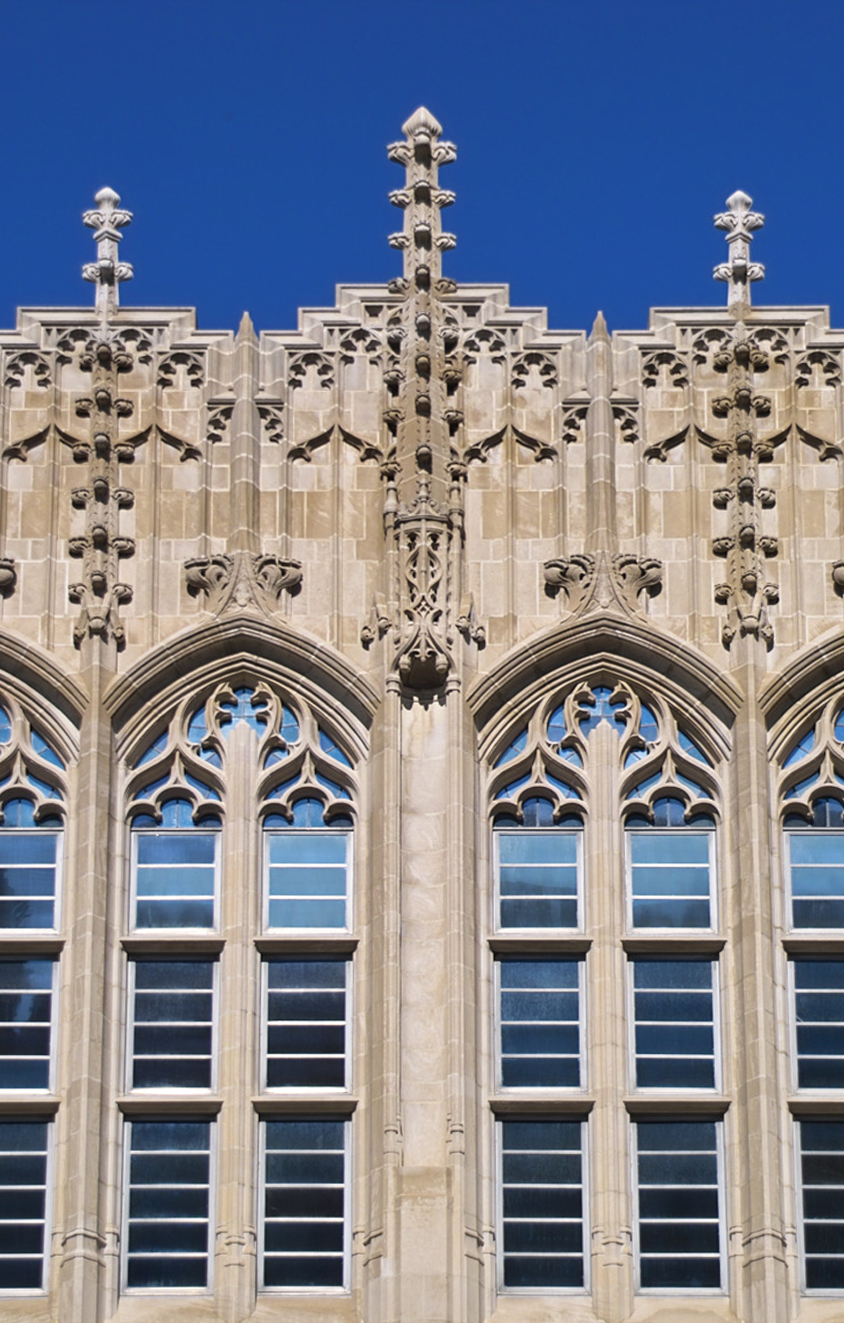
The ornate front windows of the Firestone Library

Firestone Library opened in 1948, as the first large American university library constructed after World War II. It was designed by architects Robert B. O'Connor and Walter H. Kilham Jr. Roughly 1.5 million volumes were moved during the summer of 1948 from East Pyne Hall, which until then had served as the University's main library. The library building was expanded in 1971 and again in 1988 and currently has more than 70 miles (110 km) of bookshelves, making Firestone one of the largest open-stack libraries in existence. Though not the largest university library in the world, the library has more books per enrolled student than that of any other university in the United States.

The Firestone building itself does not appear very large from the outside, because most of its books are stored in three partially underground levels that extend beyond the footprint of the main building. Firestone has four smaller above-ground floors. Princeton's book collection has outgrown Firestone's present capacity. Therefore, volumes relating to many academic subjects are no longer housed at Firestone, but at approximately a dozen other library buildings or spaces located around the campus.

Firestone contains many study spaces, most prominently the Trustee Reading Room (an open study space bounded on one side by glass panels containing the names of all present and past university trustees and presidents) and the atrium. It contains a small number of the original carrels (offices about the size of a large closet) reserved for faculty, graduate students, and undergraduate seniors working on their theses. Many academic departments also maintain seminar and study rooms within Firestone.

=== Special Collections ===
In addition to its open-stack collections, Firestone also houses the Department of Special Collections, which includes The Scheide Library, a now permanent part of the library's collections following the death of William H. Scheide. This marks the largest gift in University's history. It also includes the Cotsen Children's Library, an extensive collection presented to the library by its owner Lloyd E. Cotsen in 1997.

Also included in special collections are the autographed manuscript of F. Scott Fitzgerald's The Great Gatsby, Mario Vargas Llosa's Papers, Toni Morrison's Papers, and George F. Kennan's Long Telegram. Another notable collection is a vellum fragment of an original Gutenberg Bible.

Since the 1970s, the library has collected Latin American and Spanish ephemera to document with non-governmental primary sources the political developments, a rare emphasis on systematically acquiring these materials. In early 2015, the Digital Archive of Latin American and Caribbean Ephemera became available, thanks to a grant from the Council on Library and Information Resources. This expands access to some of the items not previously catalogued in sub-collections and microfilmed.

The library also contains a social science data center, and a variety of library services.

== Other libraries ==
Other campus libraries include the following:

- Architecture Library
- East Asian Library and Gest Collection
- Engineering Library
- Lewis Science Library
- Marquand Library of Art and Archaeology
- Seeley G. Mudd Manuscript Library
- Furth Plasma Physics Library
- Mendel Music Library
- Scheide Library
- Stokes Library for Public and International Affairs & Population Research

In addition, ReCAP (Research Collections and Preservation Consortium) and two annexes, the Forrestal Annex (Annex A) and Fine Hall Annex (Annex B), located at the Princeton University Forrestal campus, are used to store volumes and materials that are less frequently used.

Lewis Science Library, designed by Frank Gehry, is the campus' newest library building, having opened in the Fall of 2008. Lewis consolidates research collections and staff for the physical and life sciences, as well as maps and geospatial information.

Exterior of Dulles Reading Room

== Access to library services ==
Currently only registered students, alumni, university faculty, staff, their spouses, domestic partners and dependents, students of Princeton Theological Seminary, the Institute for Advanced Study, and visiting faculty are permitted open (free) access and borrowing privileges in the Princeton University library system. Patrons of the Princeton Public Library may borrow daily access to Firestone. In general, non-university patrons may use the library for research but are not given borrowing privileges and must purchase an access card in order to enter and use the library facilities.

== See also ==
- Google Books Library Project
- Princeton Papyri
- The Ocean Full of Bowling Balls – a J. D. Salinger story held only in this library
