= Princeton Papyri =

The Princeton University's collection of papyri, housed at the Princeton University, was compiled by Rosalie Cook and other papyrologists, working under the supervision of Don C. Skemer. The catalog contains 1529 inventory items, 648 of them belong to 'unidentified papyri', nearly 700 items in Greek, 260 of them are published. 115 papyri written in various scripts of the Egyptian language, only 8 Coptic papyri have been published.

The first papyri arrived at Princeton between 1901 and 1922 (90 papyri).

- Pharaonic Papyri
- Biblical manuscripts (𝔓^{20}, 𝔓^{54}, manuscripts of LXX)
- Christian literature (writings of the Church Fathers)
- Greek Documentary Papyri
- Arabic Papyri
