= Invitation system =

An invitation system is a method of encouraging people to join an organization, such as a club or a website. In regular society, it refers to any system whereby new members are chosen; they cannot simply apply. In relation to websites and other technology-related organisations, the term refers to a more specific situation whereby invitations are sent, but there is never any approval needed from other members. Popular alternatives to this specific version are open registration and closed registration. Open registration is where any user can freely join. Closed registration involves an existing member recommending a new member and approval is sought amongst existing members. The basis of the invitation system is that a member can grant approval to a new user without having to consult any other members.

Existing members may receive a set number of invitations (sometimes in the form of tokens) to allow others to join the service. Those invited to a website are typically sent either a specialized URL or a single-use pass code.

== Applications ==
Invitation systems for websites are usually temporary. They are typically used for services in private beta testing, in order to control the number of users on the service. In other cases, they can be used due to limited availability of server resources. There are a growing number of sites which use invitation systems on a permanent basis to create exclusivity and to control quality of user-generated content. Rarely, they may be used on a permanent basis in order to aggregate social network statistics (all users will ultimately have a traceable connection to all others). They are sometimes used to avoid abusive types or spammers, by relying on mutual trust between all members.

== Variations ==
Sometimes, a tiered invitation system may be in place, wherein those higher up the hierarchy will have the power to grant more invitations, whereas low-ranking members may receive few or even no invitation rights.

== Examples ==
Some prominent services which were once invitation-based include blog-host LiveJournal, social network Yahoo 360°, and podcast publisher Odeo. When Google releases new services, an invitation requirement has often been imposed for the first few months of the service's existence, including email provider Gmail, social networking service Orkut and real-time collaboration site Google Wave.

Many BitTorrent trackers, known as "private trackers", use an invitation system in order to maintain torrent quality, speeds, and safety. Demonoid and ImmortalSeed are examples of invitation-only trackers. Despite its invitation-only status, Oink's Pink Palace was accessed by government authorities and forced to close in October 2007.

Several actors in the video game industry are also using this approach.
