= Lost Years of Merlin series =

Novel series by T. A. Barron

The Lost Years of Merlin series consists of the following books written by T. A. Barron, describing the experiences of a young Merlin before his appearance in the Arthurian legend. The series consists of the following books: The Lost Years of Merlin (1996),The Seven Songs of Merlin (1997), The Fires of Merlin (1998), The Mirror of Merlin (1999), and The Wings of Merlin (2000).
