= Merlin Book 9: The Great Tree of Avalon =

2004 novel by T. A. Barron

- The Great Tree of Avalon Cover
- Author: T. A. Barron
- Original title: The Great Tree of Avalon: Child of the Dark Prophecy
- Illustrator: David Elliot
- Cover artist: Larry Rostant and Tony Sahara
- Language: English
- Series: Merlin Saga
- Genre: Fantasy
- Publisher: Philomel Books
- Publication date: October 2004
- Publication place: United States
- Media type: Print (hardcover)
- Pages: 434 (hardcover edition)
- ISBN: 0-399-23763-1
- OCLC: 54806035
- LC Class: PZ7.B27567 Ch 2004
- Preceded by: Merlin Book 8: Ultimate Magic
- Followed by: Merlin Book 10: Shadows on the Stars
- Website: The Great Tree of Avalon

The Great Tree of Avalon is a fantasy novel by T. A. Barron, published by Penguin Young Readers Group. The book is the ninth novel in the 12-book series known as Merlin Saga. It was originally published as The Great Tree of Avalon: Child of the Dark Prophecy, the first novel in The Great Tree of Avalon trilogy, and is set in a world made up of a great tree and its seven roots inhabited by creatures.

== Plot summary ==
Avalon started its life as a magical seed that beat like a heart, planted by Merlin in earlier books from the Merlin Saga. Soon it grew into a huge tree, having members of every existing species living in its 7 root-realms. Élano, the sap of the Great Tree, is a liquid that has the power to create, with powers far greater than that of Merlin himself.

For the first several centuries of Avalon's existence, the creatures lived in harmony, guided by the religion of Avalon, the Society of the Whole, its followers known as Drumadians, named after a wood in The Lost Years of Merlin. The Society was started by Elen and Rhiannon, mother and sister to Merlin respectively, also characters from The Lost Years of Merlin. The Society promotes harmony between all races, and the upkeep of the Great Tree, which sustains them all. However, sometime after Elen died, Rhiannon, called Rhia, resigned as High Priestess and left, never to be seen again.

Peace is shattered by the War of Storms, a war that included almost all of the races in Avalon and lasted for several centuries. The beginning of the war was heralded by the darkening of the stars in the constellation the Wizard's Staff. The war was only resolved by the Treaty of the Swaying Sea, crafted by the mysterious Lady of the Lake and by Merlin. After the war ended, Merlin said that he would probably not return to Avalon, and that Avalon's problems must be solved by Avalonians. As a parting gift he, with the help of his friend Basilgarrad the dragon, flew up to the stars and rekindled the darkened constellation.

All was well until the Lady of the Lake again appeared, this time to say a prophecy that begins: "A year will come when stars go dark,/ And faith will fail anon--/ For born shall be a child who spells/ The end of Avalon."

During the foretold Dark Year, the majority of creatures in Avalon forbade childbirth, killing all children born in spite of the moratorium. Despite this, rumors persist of a child being born in the Flamelon stronghold in the root-realm Rahnawyn or Fireroot.

17 years after the Dark Year, things are going badly. A drought appears in realms Olanabram, Brynchilla, and El Urien; humans become anthropocentric and arrogant; and the stars in the Wizard's Staff are again darkening, one by one. Characters Tamwyn, Elli, Nuic, Henni, Llynia, and later Batty Lad, must journey to the Lady of the Lake to find out what is happening, and how they can stop it.

Eventually, it is revealed that a sorcerer, Kulwych or White Hands, a servant of the evil spirit Rhita Gawr, has dammed the river that sustains the three realms named above with the sole purpose of collecting enough of the water, which has élano, a powerful life-giving substance, to produce a pure and powerful crystal. For this, he needs Merlin's staff, Ohnyalei, which has been for seventeen years in the keeping of Tamwyn's foster-brother, the eagleman Scree, who was also born in the Dark Year.

== Characters ==
=== Main characters ===
- Tamwyn: A young man who has, for the majority of his lifetime, lived in the realm of Rahnawyn with his adopted brother, Scree. He has suspicions that he might be the Dark Child, as he is born in the Dark Year and seems to think there is a hidden darkness in him. His name means Dark Flame in the language of the flamelons, his mother's people. He is also very adventurous.
- Scree: An eagleboy, having the ability to change between human form and that of an eagle. After his mother was murdered, he was adopted by Tamwyn's mother, and raised by her until he was ten years old. As their mother attempted to teach the two the art of portalseeking, wherein the traveler is teleported through the vascular system of Avalon itself, she is killed by the assassin-like birds called ghoulacas. Later, visiting the portal, Tamwyn and Scree are attacked by the birds again; the two boys enter the portal to escape. Tamwyn is sent to Olanabram or Stoneroot, while Scree returns to Rahnawyn or Fireroot. The two then spend the next seven years in search of one another.
- Elliryana Lailoken/Elli: A young and newly minted priestess at the Society of the Whole. Her parents were killed in gnome raids; she was kept in slavery for the majority of her life, clinging to the only remnant of her parents: a harp made by her father, who was a priest in the Society of the Whole, that was later accidentally destroyed by Tamwyn the first day they met. After escaping, shortly before the events of this book took place, she went to the Drumadian compound to become a priestess, hoping to follow in her father's footsteps. Her memories continue to haunt her.
- Nuic: Elli's faithful maryth; one of the diverse creatures voluntarily bound in partnership to Drumadian priests and priestesses. He is an old creature, often referring to ancient events at which he was present. He is a small pinnacle sprite; a rotund mountain-dweller whose color changes according to his thoughts and emotions. He is often sarcastic and impatient, though he is wise and witty.
- Rhita Gawr: A shape-shifting, immortal spirit who seeks to dominate all the worlds. He emerges slowly into physical form throughout the first two books. He is arrogant, cruel, egocentric, and prone to undervaluing all whom he meets.
- Olewyn: Though not named until Shadows on the Stars, he is quite prominent in both books. Appearing several times, he is a mysterious bard whose knowledge and power far exceeds that which he chooses to reveal. He is notable for his broad, white beard, his skills of music and poetry, and for a creature called a museo, which dwells in his hat. This creature possesses the most musical voice of all voices in Avalon.
- Kulwych: An evil sorcerer who desires to gain totalitarian control of Avalon. He especially hates Merlin, and wishes to rid Avalon of the wizard's image. He is shown to be a servant of Rhita Gawr. Kulwych is known as White Hands, because he hides his battle-scarred body beneath a cloak, allowing only his perfectly white hands to show. His plan involves the creation of a dam by which to capture the water of Geyser Crystillia, which has enough eláno to make a crystal. He then plans to corrupt the crystal, making it a thing of destruction, rather than creation.
- Brionna: A young elf from El Urien or Woodroot who is captured by White Hands's arms master, Harlech. She is forced to work on Kulwych's dam. Later, Kulwych blackmails her into stealing the staff Ohnyalei from Scree, who has been its keeper, by threatening the life of her grandfather Tressimir. Brionna obeys, fearing to lose her grandfather. She meets and befriends Shim. Brionna, having stolen Ohnyalei, is betrayed by Kulwych. She later abets the destruction of his dam.
- Henni: Henni is a hoolah; a mischievous, reckless, comical person who sees life as a game. He enjoys seeing people become frustrated or hot-tempered, because they are then excited and therefore appear absurd to him. He fulfills this liking by joining the travelling group consisting of Elli, Nuic, Llynia, Llynia's maryth Fairlyn, and Tamwyn, whom he teases relentlessly. Henni, for his part, becomes more sober as a result of his experiences of violence and danger.

=== Supporting characters ===
- Shim: A giant who has been reduced to the size of a dwarf, not once but twice, having grown to giant-size in between. He is as old as Avalon itself. Shim is a friend of Merlin's, encountered first in The Lost Years of Merlin. In Child of the Dark Prophecy, he befriends Brionna. Shim always speaks with a particular mannerism, distinguished by his haphazard use of suffices and his use of syn
- Llynia: A priestess of the Society of the Whole. Llynia is excessively arrogant, egocentric, and anthropocentric. She torments Elli constantly and abuses all whom she meets, except the gardener Hanwan Bellamir, who is as anthropocentric as she despite his gentler demeanor.
- Batty Lad: A small, green-eyed, bat-like creature who joins Tamwyn. Batty Lad is happy-go-lucky, cheerful, and talkative. He speaks very quickly, with a tendency toward colorful language. His origins are implied to be of great significance.
- Rhiannon: T. A. Barron's re-invention of the Lady of the Lake. Rhia, as she is sometimes called, is vital, optimistic, friendly, humorous, courteous, compassionate, wise, and skilled in magical arts. She is very much in touch with nature, though at times she surrenders to her frustrations. She is Merlin's sister and Tamwyn's great-aunt.
- Krystallus Eopia: Though he did not actually take action in the book, Krystallus was often mentioned. Son of the wizard Merlin and deer-woman Hallia, Krystallus was a great explorer who died on his greatest expedition, the journey to the stars. The Lady of the Lake later revealed to Tamwyn that Krystallus was his father.

== The Seven Root Realms ==
The Great Tree of Avalon splits into seven roots (realms):

- Airroot (Y Swylarna)
- Mudroot (Maloch)
- Stoneroot (Olanabram)
- Waterroot (Brynchilla)
- Fireroot (Rahnawyn)
- Woodroot (El Urien)
- Shadowroot (Lastrael)

== The Books in the Merlin Saga ==
=== The Lost Years of Merlin Epic ===
- Merlin Book 1: The Lost Years; originally issued as The Lost Years of Merlin (1996)
- Merlin Book 2: The Seven Songs; originally issued as The Seven Songs of Merlin (1997)
- Merlin Book 3: The Raging Fires; originally issued as The Fires of Merlin (1998)
- Merlin Book 4: The Mirror of Fate; originally issued as The Mirror of Merlin (1999)
- Merlin Book 5: A Wizard's Wings; originally issued as The Wings of Merlin (2000)

=== Merlin's Dragon Trilogy ===
- Merlin Book 6: The Dragon of Avalon; originally issued as Merlin's Dragon (2008)
- Merlin Book 7: Doomraga's Revenge (2009)
- Merlin Book 8: Ultimate Magic (2010)

=== The Great Tree of Avalon Trilogy ===
- Merlin Book 9: The Great Tree of Avalon; originally issued as Child of the Dark Prophecy (2004)
- Merlin Book 10: Shadows on the Stars (2005)
- Merlin Book 11: The Eternal Flame (2007)

=== The Book of Magic ===
- Book 12: Merlin: The Book of Magic (2011), companion to the Merlin saga
