= Christian mythology =

Body of myths associated with Christianity

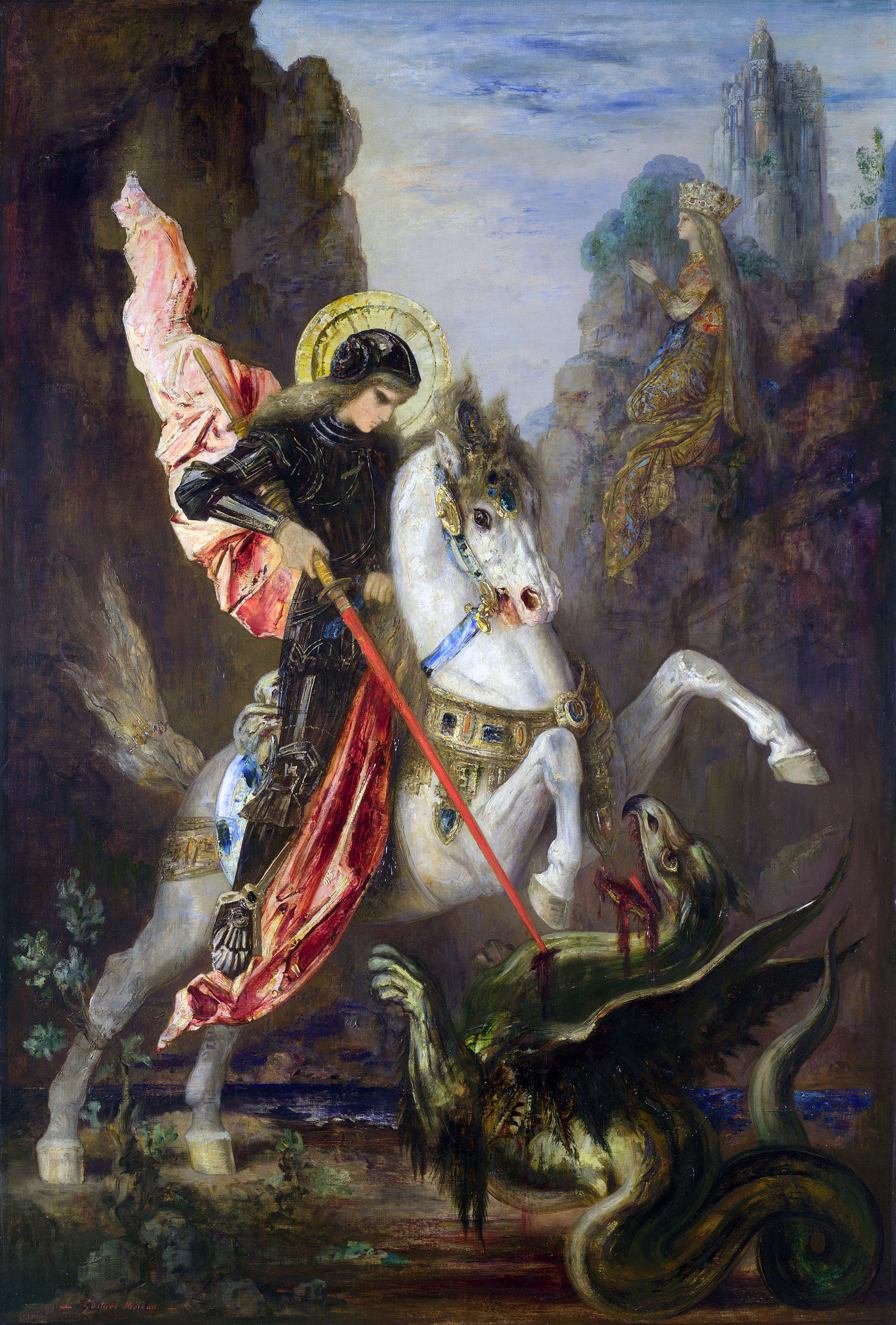
Saint George and the Dragon by Gustave Moreau, 1889–90

Christian mythology is the body of myths associated with Christianity. Christian mythology has been examined by scholars in the fields of comparative mythology, theology and literary studies. The term encompasses a broad variety of legends and narratives, especially those considered sacred narratives. Mythological themes and elements occur throughout Christian literature, including recurring myths such as ascending a mountain, the axis mundi, myths of combat, descent into the Underworld, accounts of a dying-and-rising god, a flood myth, stories about the founding of a tribe or city, and myths about great heroes (or saints) of the past, paradises, and self-sacrifice.

Various authors have also used it to refer to other mythological and allegorical elements found in the Bible, such as the story of the Leviathan. The term has been applied to myths and legends from the Middle Ages, such as the story of Saint George and the Dragon, the stories of King Arthur and his Knights of the Round Table, and the legends of the Parsival. Multiple commentators have classified John Milton's epic poem Paradise Lost as a work of Christian mythology. The term has also been applied to modern stories revolving around Christian themes and motifs, such as the writings of C. S. Lewis, J. R. R. Tolkien, Madeleine L'Engle, and George MacDonald.

Medieval Christian mythology also incorporated motifs from local European folklore and pre-Christian traditions. Elements of Christian mythology has influenced modern fantasy literature, visual art, music and popular culture.

Over the centuries, Christianity has divided into many denominations. Not all of these denominations hold the same set of sacred traditional narratives. For example, the books of the Bible accepted by the Roman Catholic Church and the Eastern Orthodox churches include a number of texts and stories (such as those narrated in the Book of Judith and Book of Tobit) that many Protestant denominations do not accept as canonical.

== Attitudes ==
Christian theologian and professor of New Testament, Rudolf Bultmann wrote that:

The cosmology of the New Testament is essentially mythical in character. The world is viewed as a three storied structure, with the earth in the center, the heaven above, and the underworld beneath. Heaven is the abode of God and of celestial beings – the angels. The underworld is hell, the place of torment. Even the earth is more than the scene of natural, everyday events, of the trivial round and common task. It is the scene of the supernatural activity of God and his angels on the one hand, and of Satan and his demons on the other. These supernatural forces intervene in the course of nature and in all that men think and will and do. Miracles are by no means rare. Man is not in control of his own life. Evil spirits may take possession of him. Satan may inspire him with evil thoughts. Alternatively, God may inspire his thought and guide his purposes. He may grant him heavenly visions. He may allow him to hear his word of succor or demand. He may give him the supernatural power of his Spirit. History does not follow a smooth unbroken course; it is set in motion and controlled by these supernatural powers. This æon is held in bondage by Satan, sin, and death (for "powers" is precisely what they are), and hastens towards its end. That end will come very soon, and will take the form of a cosmic catastrophe. It will be inaugurated by the "woes" of the last time. Then the Judge will come from heaven, the dead will rise, the last judgment will take place, and men will enter into eternal salvation or damnation.

=== Myths as traditional or sacred stories ===
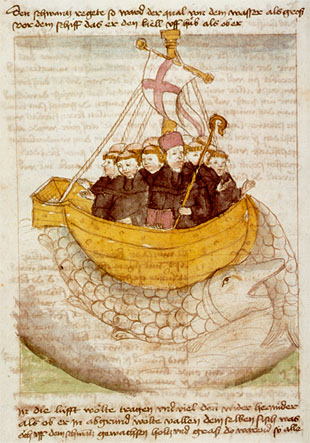
Saint Brendan's voyage, from a German manuscript

In its broadest academic sense, the word myth simply means a traditional story. However, many scholars restrict the term "myth" to sacred stories. Folklorists often go further, defining myths as "tales believed as true, usually sacred, set in the distant past or other worlds or parts of the world, and with extra-human, inhuman, or heroic characters".

In classical Greek, muthos, from which the English word myth derives, meant "story, narrative." By the time of Christ, muthos had started to take on the connotations of "fable, fiction," and early Christian writers often avoided calling a story from canonical scripture a "myth". Paul warned Timothy to have nothing to do with "godless and silly myths" (bebēthous kai graōdeis muthous). This negative meaning of "myth" passed into popular usage. Some modern Christian scholars and writers have attempted to rehabilitate the term "myth" outside academia, describing stories in canonical scripture (especially the Christ story) as "true myth"; examples include C. S. Lewis and Andrew Greeley. (Note: C. S. Lewis used the expression "true myth" to describe the story of Jesus Christ: "The story of Christ is simply a true myth: a myth working on us in the same way as the others, but with this tremendous difference that it really happened: and one must be content to accept it in the same way, remembering that it is God's myth where the others are men's myths" (C. S. Lewis, in Brown). Andrew Greeley stated: "Many Christians have objected to my use of this word [myth] even when I define it specifically. They are terrified by a word which may even have a slight suggestion of fantasy. However, my usage is the one that is common among historians of religion, literary critics, and social scientists. It is a valuable and helpful usage; there is no other word which conveys what these scholarly traditions mean when they refer to myth. The Christian would be well advised to get over his fear of the word and appreciate how important a tool it can be for understanding the content of his faith" (Greeley, Myths of Religion, in: Bierlein, 1994, 304–305).) Several modern Christian writers, such as C. S. Lewis, have described elements of Christianity, particularly the story of Christ, as "myth" which is also "true" ("true myth"). Others object to associating Christianity with "myth" for a variety of reasons: the association of the term "myth" with polytheism, the use of the term "myth" to indicate falsehood or non-historicity, and the lack of an agreed-upon definition of "myth". As examples of Biblical myths, Every cites the creation account in Genesis 1 and 2 and the story of Eve's temptation.

Christian tradition contains many stories that do not come from canonical Christian texts yet still illustrate Christian themes. These non-canonical Christian myths include legends, folktales, and elaborations on canonical Christian mythology. Christian tradition has produced a rich body of legends that were never incorporated into the official scriptures. Legends were a staple of medieval literature. Examples include hagiographies such as the stories of Saint George or Saint Valentine. A case in point is the historical and canonized Brendan of Clonfort, a 6th-century Irish churchman and founder of abbeys. Round his authentic figure was woven a tissue that is arguably legendary rather than historical: the Navigatio or "Journey of Brendan". The legend discusses mythic events in the sense of supernatural encounters. In this narrative, Brendan and his shipmates encounter sea monsters, a paradisal island and a floating ice island and a rock island inhabited by a holy hermit: literal-minded devotés still seek to identify "Brendan's islands" in actual geography. This voyage was recreated by Tim Severin, suggesting that whales, icebergs and Rockall were encountered.

Folktales form a major part of non-canonical Christian tradition. Folklorists define folktales (in contrast to "true" myths) as stories that are considered purely fictitious by their tellers and that often lack a specific setting in space or time. Christian-themed folktales have circulated widely among peasant populations. One widespread folktale genre is that of the Penitent Sinner (classified as Type 756A, B, C, in the Aarne-Thompson index of tale types); another popular group of folktales describe a clever mortal who outwits the Devil. Not all scholars accept the folkloristic convention of applying the terms "myth" and "folktale" to different categories of traditional narrative.

Christian tradition produced many popular stories elaborating on canonical scripture. According to an English folk belief, certain herbs gained their current healing power from having been used to heal Christ's wounds on Mount Calvary. In this case, a non-canonical story has a connection to a non-narrative form of folklore — namely, folk medicine. Arthurian legend contains many elaborations upon canonical mythology. For example, Sir Balin discovers the Lance of Longinus, which had pierced the side of Christ. According to a tradition widely attested in early Christian writings, Adam's skull lay buried at Calvary; when Christ was crucified, his blood fell over Adam's skull, symbolizing humanity's redemption from Adam's sin.

== Christ ==
- The Gospel accounts of Jesus Christ, his life and death. Here the narrative is combined by the author with a story of how all Christian theology "came to be". For example, the story of Jesus as the "word" or "Logos" (John 1:1), the Incarnation of the Logos or Son of God as the man Jesus (e.g., Luke 1:35), and Christ's atonement for humanity's sins (e.g., Matthew 26:28). Important narratives within the Gospel accounts include:
  - Christ's miraculous conception and birth from the Virgin Mary
  - The baptism of Jesus
  - Satan's temptation of Christ
  - The Transfiguration of Jesus
  - Parables of Jesus
  - The Last Supper
  - The death and resurrection of Jesus
  - The Ascension
- The Acts of the Apostles – the story of the Early Christian church, the ministry of the Twelve Apostles and of Paul the Apostle.
  - The descent of the Holy Spirit on Jesus' disciples after the Ascension.

== Eschatology ==
- The coming of the Antichrist
- The Second Coming
- The resurrection of the dead
- Judgement Day
- The final and total establishment of the Kingdom of God on earth

== Other examples ==
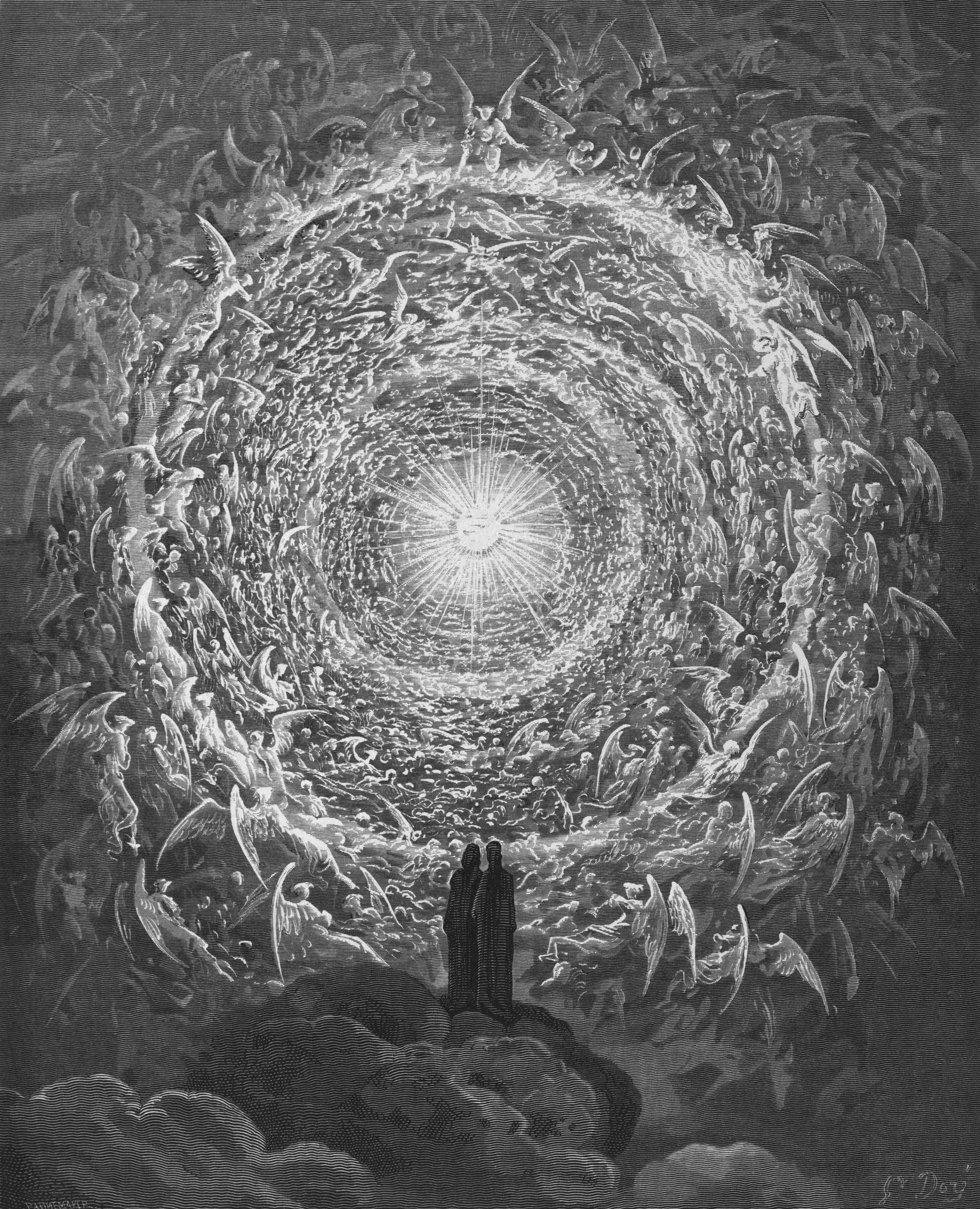
Dante and Beatrice gaze upon the highest Heaven (The Empyrean), illustration for the Divine Comedy by Gustave Doré (1832–1883), Paradiso Canto 31.

Examples of (1) Christian myths not mentioned in canon and (2) literary and traditional elaborations on canonical Christian mythology:

- Versions of Christian mythology used by Gnostic Christianity
  - The Valentinian creation myth involving Sophia and the demiurge.
  - The Manichaean creation myth.
  - The Gnostic accounts of Jesus, some of which present a Docetic view of Jesus; see Gnostic Gospels.
- Literary treatments of Christian canon or theology
  - John Milton's Paradise Lost, which describes Satan's rebellion against God and the Fall of Man, and his Paradise Regained, which describes Satan's temptation of Christ.
  - Dante Alighieri's Divine Comedy, a literary allegory that describes a visit to Hell, Purgatory, and Heaven.
  - John Bunyan's Pilgrim's Progress, a Christian spiritual allegory.
  - C. S. Lewis's The Pilgrim's Regress, a more modern Christian spiritual allegory.
  - According to some interpretations, Aslan's role in C. S. Lewis's The Lion, the Witch, and the Wardrobe allegorically represents Christ's death and resurrection (although Lewis denies that the story is a direct allegory; see section on "Mythopoeia" above).
- Legends about Christian saints and heroes. Examples include Abgarus of Edessa, John the Dwarf, and Saint George. Legends about saints are commonly called hagiographies. Some such stories are heavily miraculous, such as those found in Jacobus de Voragine's Golden Legend; others, less so.
- Stories about artifacts such as the Holy Grail, Holy Lance, and Shroud of Turin.
- Names and biographical details supplied for unnamed Biblical characters; see List of names for the Biblical nameless
- The legends of King Arthur and Charlemagne as Christian kings, notably the Quest for the Holy Grail.
- Legendary history of the Christian churches, such as the tales from the Crusades or the paladins in medieval romance.
- Legends of the Knights Templar and the Priory of Sion.
- Medieval Christian stories about angels and guardian angels.
- Non-canonical elaborations or amendments to Biblical tales, such as the tales of Salomé, the Three Wise Men, or St. Dismas.

== Connections to other belief systems ==
=== Jewish mythology ===
- Cosmogony
  - The 7-day creation week narrative (Genesis 1:1—2:3)
  - The Eden narrative (Genesis 2:4—3:24)
- Origins
  - The Fall of Man: Although the Book of Genesis does not mention original sin, many Christians interpret the Fall as the origin of sin.
  - Noah's Ark
  - The Tower of Babel: the origin and division of nations and languages
- The life of Abraham
- The Exodus of the Hebrews from Egypt
- The Hebrews' conquest of the Promised Land
- The period of the Hebrew prophets. One example is the apocryphal part of the Book of Daniel (14:1–30; excluded from the Hebrew and Protestant canon) that tells the story of Bel and the dragon.

=== Zoroastrianism ===
Some scholars believe that many elements of Christian mythology, particularly its linear portrayal of time, originated with the Persian religion of Zoroastrianism. Mary Boyce, an authority on Zoroastrianism, writes:

Zoroaster was thus the first to teach the doctrines of an individual judgment, Heaven and Hell, the future resurrection of the body, the general Last Judgment, and life everlasting for the reunited soul and body. These doctrines were to become familiar articles of faith to much of mankind, through borrowings by Judaism, Christianity and Islam.

Mircea Eliade believes the Hebrews had a sense of linear time before Zoroastrianism influenced them. However, he argues, "a number of other [Jewish] religious ideas were discovered, revalorized, or systematized in Iran". These ideas include a dualism between good and evil, belief in a future savior and resurrection, and "an optimistic eschatology, proclaiming the final triumph of Good".

The Zoroastrian concepts of Ahriman, Amesha Spentas, Yazatas, and Daevas probably gave rise to the Christian understanding of Satan, archangels, angels, and demons.

=== Other connections ===
In Buddhist mythology, the demon Mara tries to distract the historical Buddha, Siddhartha Gautama, before he can reach enlightenment. Huston Smith, a professor of philosophy and a writer on comparative religion, notes the similarity between Mara's temptation of the Buddha before his ministry and Satan's temptation of Christ before his ministry.

In the Book of Revelation, the author sees a vision of a pregnant woman in the sky being pursued by a huge red dragon. The dragon tries to devour her child when she gives birth, but the child is "caught up to God and his throne". This appears to be an allegory for the triumph of Christianity: the child presumably represents Christ; the woman may represent God's people of the Old and New Testaments (who produced Christ); and the Dragon symbolizes Satan, who opposes Christ. According to Catholic scholars, the images used in this allegory may have been inspired by pagan mythology:

This corresponds to a widespread myth throughout the ancient world that a goddess pregnant with a savior was pursued by a horrible monster; by miraculous intervention, she bore a son who then killed the monster.

== Mythical themes and types ==
Academic studies of mythology often define mythology as deeply valued stories that explain a society's existence and world order: those narratives of a society's creation, the society's origins and foundations, their god(s), their original heroes, mankind's connection to the "divine", and their narratives of eschatology (what happens in the "after-life"). This is a very general outline of some of the basic sacred stories with those themes.

=== Cosmogonic myths ===
The Christian texts use the same creation myth as Jewish mythology as written in the Old Testament. According to the Book of Genesis, the world was created out of a darkness and water in seven days. (Unlike a Jew, a Christian might include the miracle of Jesus' birth as a sort of second cosmogonic event) Canonical Christian scripture incorporates the two Hebrew cosmogonic myths found in Genesis 1:1—2:2 and Genesis 2:4—3:24.

==== Genesis 1:1—2:3 ====
In the first text on the creation (Genesis 1:1—2:3), the Creator is called Elohim (commonly translated simply as "God"). He creates the universe over a six-day period, creating a new feature each day: first he creates day and night; then he creates the firmament to separate the "waters above" from the "waters below"; then he separates the dry land from the water; then he creates plants on the land; then he places the Sun, Moon, and stars in the sky; then he creates swimming and flying animals; then he creates land animals; and finally he creates man and woman together, "in his own image". On the seventh day, God rests, providing the rationale for the custom of resting on Sabbath.

==== Genesis 2:4—3:24 ====
The second creation myth in Genesis differs from the first in a number of important elements. Here the Creator is called Yahweh elohim (commonly translated "Lord God" or "LORD God" (with small caps), although Yahweh is in fact the personal name of the God of Israel and does not literally mean "Lord").

This myth begins with the words, "When the LORD God made the earth and the heavens, and no shrub of the field was yet in the earth, and no plant of the field had yet sprouted, for the LORD God had not sent rain upon the earth ..." (Genesis 2:4–5 NASB). It then proceeds to describe Yahweh creating a man called Adam out of dust. Yahweh creates the Garden of Eden as a home for Adam, and tells Adam not to eat the fruit of the Tree of Knowledge of Good and Evil in the center of the Garden (next to the Tree of Life).

Yahweh also creates animals, and shows them to man, who names them. Yahweh sees that there is no suitable companion for the man among the beasts, and he subsequently puts Adam to sleep and takes out one of Adam's ribs, creating from it a woman whom Adam names Eve.

A talking serpent tempts Eve to eat from the Tree of Knowledge of Good and Evil, and she succumbs, offering the fruit to Adam as well. As a punishment, Yahweh banishes the couple from the Garden and "placed on the east side of the Garden of Eden the cherubim with a fiery revolving sword to guard the way to the Tree of Life". The Lord says he must banish humans from the Garden because they have become like him, knowing good and evil (because of eating the forbidden fruit), and now only immortality (which they could get by eating from the Tree of Life) stands between them and godhood:

"The man has now become like one of us, knowing good and evil. He must not be allowed to reach out his hand and take also from the tree of life and eat, and live forever" (Genesis 3:22).

Although the text of Genesis does not identify the tempting serpent with Satan, Christian tradition equates the two. This tradition has made its way into non-canonical Christian "myths" such as John Milton's Paradise Lost.

=== Ascending the mountain ===
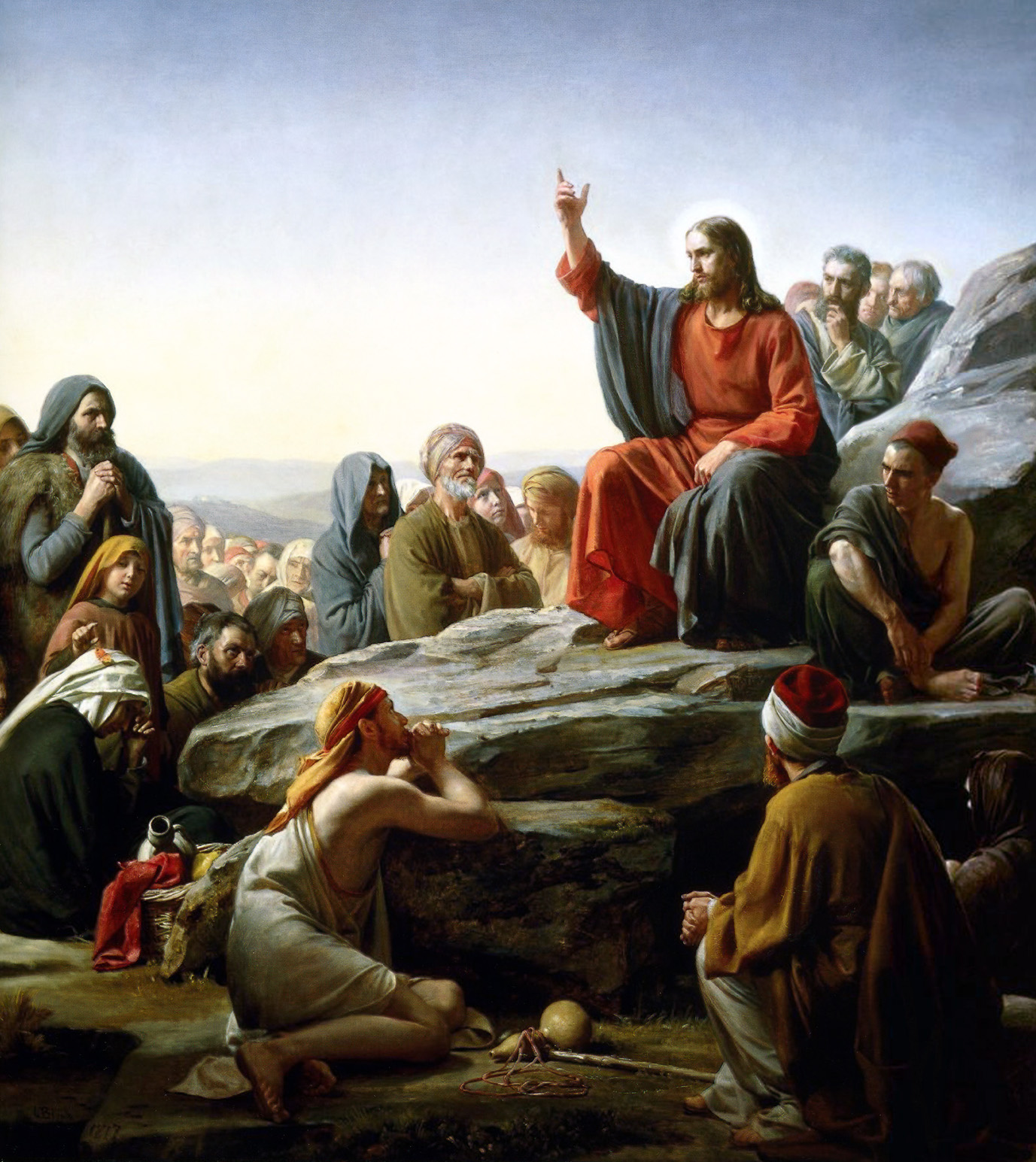
Jesus' Sermon on the Mount depicted by Carl Bloch

According to Lorena Laura Stookey, many myths feature sacred mountains as "the sites of revelations": "In myth, the ascent of the holy mountain is a spiritual journey, promising purification, insight, wisdom, or knowledge of the sacred". As examples of this theme, Stookey includes the revelation of the Ten Commandments on Mount Sinai, Christ's ascent of a mountain to deliver his Sermon on the Mount, and Christ's ascension into Heaven from the Mount of Olives.

=== Axis mundi ===
Many mythologies involve a "world center", which is often the sacred place of creation; this center often takes the form of a tree, mountain, or other upright object, which serves as an axis mundi or axle of the world. A number of scholars have connected the Christian story of the crucifixion at Golgotha with this theme of a cosmic center. In his Creation Myths of the World, David Leeming argues that, in the Christian story of the crucifixion, the cross serves as "the axis mundi, the center of a new creation".

According to a tradition preserved in Eastern Christian folklore, Golgotha was the summit of the cosmic mountain at the center of the world and the location where Adam had been both created and buried. According to this tradition, when Christ is crucified, his blood falls on Adam's skull, buried at the foot of the cross, and redeems him. George Every discusses the connection between the cosmic center and Golgotha in his book Christian Mythology, noting that the image of Adam's skull beneath the cross appears in many medieval representations of the crucifixion.

In Creation Myths of the World, Leeming suggests that the Garden of Eden may also be considered a world center.

=== Combat myth ===
Many Near Eastern religions include a story about a battle between a divine being and a dragon or other monster representing chaos—a theme found, for example, in the Enuma Elish. A number of scholars call this story the "combat myth". A number of scholars have argued that the ancient Israelites incorporated the combat myth into their religious imagery, such as the figures of Leviathan and Rahab, the Song of the Sea, Isaiah 51:9–10's description of God's deliverance of his people from Babylon, and the portrayals of enemies such as Pharaoh and Nebuchadnezzar. The idea of Satan as God's opponent may have developed under the influence of the combat myth. Scholars have also suggested that the Book of Revelation uses combat myth imagery in its descriptions of cosmic conflict.

=== Descent to the underworld ===
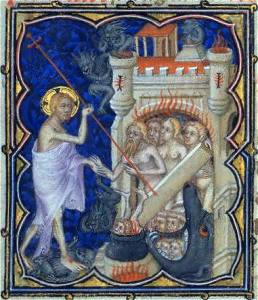
The Harrowing of Hell, depicted in the Petites Heures de Jean de Berry, 14th-century illuminated manuscript

According to David Leeming, writing in The Oxford Companion to World Mythology, the harrowing of hell is an example of the motif of the hero's descent to the underworld, which is common in many mythologies. According to Christian tradition, Christ descended to hell after his death in order to free the souls there; this event is known as the Harrowing of Hell. This story is narrated in the Gospel of Nicodemus and may be the meaning behind 1 Peter 3:18–22. (Note: Every also sees New Testament references to the general resurrection (e.g. in John 5:25–29) as connected with the harrowing of hell, because he believes that early Christianity did not distinguish clearly between the Christ's liberation of souls from hell and the general resurrection (Every 66).)

=== Dying God ===
Many myths, particularly from the Near East, feature a God who dies and is resurrected; this figure is sometimes called the "dying god". An important study of this figure is James George Frazer's The Golden Bough, which traces the dying God theme through a large number of myths. The dying God is often associated with fertility. A number of scholars, including Frazer, have suggested that the Christ story is an example of the "dying God" theme. In the article "Dying God" in The Oxford Companion to World Mythology, David Leeming notes that Christ can be seen as bringing fertility, though of a spiritual as opposed to physical kind.

In his 2006 homily for Corpus Christi, Pope Benedict XVI noted the similarity between the Christian story of the resurrection and pagan myths of dead and resurrected gods: "In these myths, the soul of the human person, in a certain way, reached out toward that God made man, who, humiliated unto death on a cross, in this way opened the door of life to all of us."

=== Flood myths ===
Many cultures have myths about a flood that cleanses the world in preparation for rebirth. Such stories appear on every inhabited continent on earth. An example is the biblical story of Noah. In The Oxford Companion to World Mythology, David Leeming notes that, in the Bible story, as in other flood myths, the flood marks a new beginning and a second chance for creation and humanity.

=== Founding myths ===
According to Sandra Frankiel, the records of "Jesus' life and death, his acts and words" provide the "founding myths" of Christianity. Frankiel claims that these founding myths are "structurally equivalent" to the creation myths in other religions, because they are "the pivot around which the religion turns to and which it returns", establishing the "meaning" of the religion and the "essential Christian practices and attitudes". Tom Cain uses the expression "founding myths" more broadly, to encompass such stories as those of the War in Heaven and the fall of man; according to Cain, "the disastrous consequences of disobedience" is a pervasive theme in Christian founding myths.

Christian mythology of their society's founding would start with Jesus and his many teachings, and include the stories of Christian disciples starting the Christian Church and congregations in the 1st century. This might be considered the stories in the four canonical gospels and the Acts of the Apostles. The heroes of the first Christian society would start with Jesus and those chosen by Jesus, the twelve apostles including Peter, John, James, as well as Paul and Mary (mother of Jesus).

=== Hero myths ===
In his influential 1909 work The Myth of the Birth of the Hero, Otto Rank argued that the births of many mythical heroes follow a common pattern. Rank includes the story of Christ's birth as a representative example of this pattern.

According to Mircea Eliade, one pervasive mythical theme associates heroes with the slaying of dragons, a theme which Eliade traces back to "the very ancient cosmogonico-heroic myth" of a battle between a divine hero and a dragon. He cites the Christian legend of Saint George as an example of this theme. An example from the Late Middle Ages comes from Dieudonné de Gozon, third Grand Master of the Knights of Rhodes, famous for slaying the dragon of Malpasso. Eliade writes:

"Legend, as was natural, bestowed upon him the attributes of St. George, famed for his victorious fight with the monster. [...] In other words, by the simple fact that he was regarded as a hero, de Gozon was identified with a category, an archetype, which [...] equipped him with a mythical biography from which it was impossible to omit combat with a reptilian monster."

In the Oxford Companion to World Mythology, David Leeming lists Moses, Jesus, and King Arthur as examples of the heroic monomyth, calling the Christ story "a particularly complete example of the heroic monomyth". Leeming regards resurrection as a common part of the heroic monomyth, in which the resurrected heroes often become sources of "material or spiritual food for their people"; in this connection, Leeming notes that Christians regard Jesus as the "bread of life".

In terms of values, Leeming contrasts "the myth of Jesus" with the myths of other "Christian heroes such as St. George, Roland, el Cid, and even King Arthur"; the later hero myths, Leeming argues, reflect the survival of pre-Christian heroic values—"values of military dominance and cultural differentiation and hegemony"—more than the values expressed in the Christ story.

=== Paradise ===
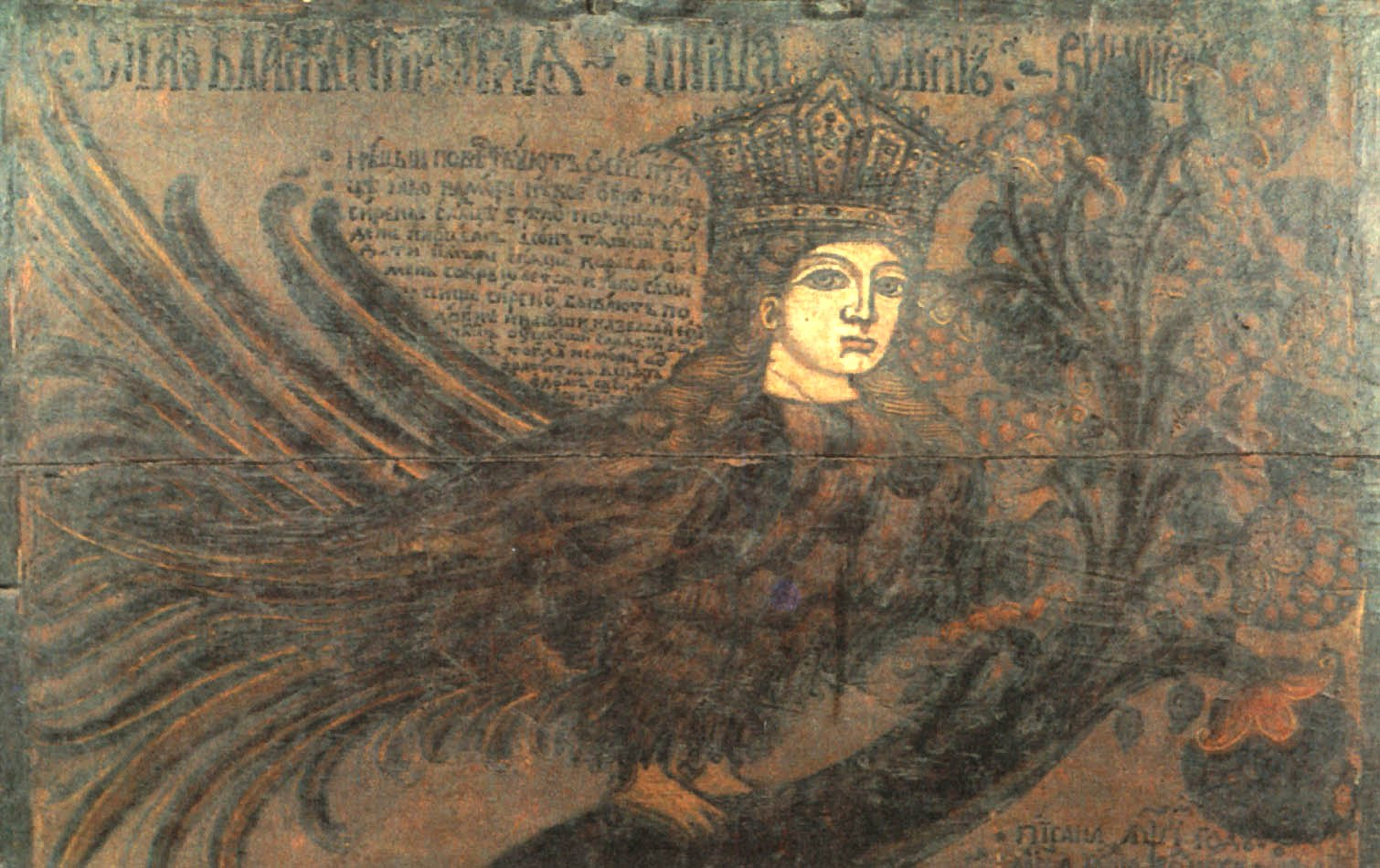
In illustrations of the Book of Genesis, Pomors often depicted sirins as birds sitting in paradise trees. 1710

Many religious and mythological systems contain myths about a paradise. Many of these myths involve the loss of a paradise that existed at the beginning of the world. Some scholars have seen in the story of the Garden of Eden an instance of this general motif.

=== Sacrifice ===
Sacrifice is an element in many religious traditions and often represented in myths. In The Oxford Companion to World Mythology, David Leeming lists the story of Abraham and Isaac and the story of Christ's death as examples of this theme. Wendy Doniger describes the gospel accounts as a "meta-myth" in which Jesus realizes that he is part of a "new myth [...] of a man who is sacrificed in hate" but "sees the inner myth, the old myth of origins and acceptance, the myth of a god who sacrifices himself in love".

=== Eucharist ===
Related to the doctrine of transsubstantiation, the Christian practice of eating the flesh and blood of Jesus Christ during the Eucharist is an instance of theophagy.

=== Transference of evil ===
The theological concept of Jesus being born to atone for original sin is central to the Christian narrative. According to Christian theology, by Adam disobeying God in the Garden of Eden, humanity acquired an ingrained flaw that keeps humans in a state of moral imperfection, generally called "original sin". According to Paul the Apostle, Adam's sin brought sin and death to all humanity: "Through one man, sin entered the world, and through sin, death" (Romans 5:12).

According to the orthodox Christian view, Jesus saved humanity from final death and damnation by dying for them. Most Christians believe that Christ's sacrifice supernaturally reversed death's power over humanity, proved when he was resurrected, and abolished the power of sin on humanity. According to Paul, "if the many died by the trespass of the one man, how much more did God's grace and the gift that came by the grace of the one man, Jesus Christ, overflow to the many" (Romans 5:15). For many Christians, atonement doctrine leads naturally into the eschatological narratives of Christian people rising from the dead and living again, or immediately entering heaven to join Jesus.

==== Atonement in canonical scripture ====
Paul's theological writings lay out the basic framework of the atonement doctrine in the New Testament. However, Paul's letters contain relatively little mythology (narrative). The majority of narratives in the New Testament are in the Gospels and the Book of Revelation.

Although the Gospel stories do not lay out the atonement doctrine as fully as does Paul, they do have the story of the Last Supper, crucifixion, death and resurrection. Atonement is also suggested in the parables of Jesus in his final days. According to Matthew's gospel, at the Last Supper, Jesus calls his blood "the blood of the new covenant, which will be poured out for the forgiveness of many" (Matthew 26:28). John's gospel is especially rich in atonement parables and promises: Jesus speaks of himself as "the living bread that came down from heaven"; "and the bread that I shall give is My flesh, which I shall give for the life of the world" (John 6:51); "Truly, truly, I say to you, unless a grain of wheat falls to the ground and dies, it remains alone; but if it dies, it bears much fruit" (John 12:24).

==== Atonement in non-canonical literature ====
The sacrifice and atonement narrative appears explicitly in many non-canonical writings as well. For instance, in Book 3 of Milton's Paradise Lost, the Son of God offers to become a man and die, thereby paying mankind's debt to God the Father.

The Harrowing of Hell is a non-canonical myth extrapolated from the atonement doctrine. According to this story, Christ descended into the land of the dead after his crucifixion, rescuing the righteous souls that had been cut off from heaven due to the taint of original sin. The story of the harrowing was popular during the Middle Ages. An Old English poem called "The Harrowing of Hell" describes Christ breaking into Hell and rescuing the Old Testament patriarchs. (The Harrowing is not the only explanation that Christians have put forth for the fate of the righteous who died before Christ accomplished the atonement.)

In modern literature, atonement continues to be theme. In the first of C. S. Lewis's Narnia novels, The Lion, the Witch and the Wardrobe, a boy named Edmund is condemned to death by a White Witch, and the magical lion-king Aslan offers to die in Edmund's place, thereby saving him. Aslan's life is sacrificed on an altar, but returns to life again. Aslan's self-sacrifice for Edmund is often interpreted as an allegory for the story of Christ's sacrifice for humanity; although Lewis denied that the novel is a mere allegory. (Note: A letter to a child fan named Patricia, printed in The Essential C. S. Lewis.)

=== Eschatological myths ===
Christian eschatological myths include stories of the afterlife: the narratives of Jesus Christ rising from the dead and now acting as a saviour of all generations of Christians, and stories of heaven and hell. Eschatological myths would also include the prophesies of end of the world and a new millennium in the Book of Revelation, and the story that Jesus will return to earth some day.

The major features of Christian eschatological mythology include afterlife beliefs, the Second Coming, the resurrection of the dead, and the final judgment.

==== Immediate afterlife (heaven and hell) ====
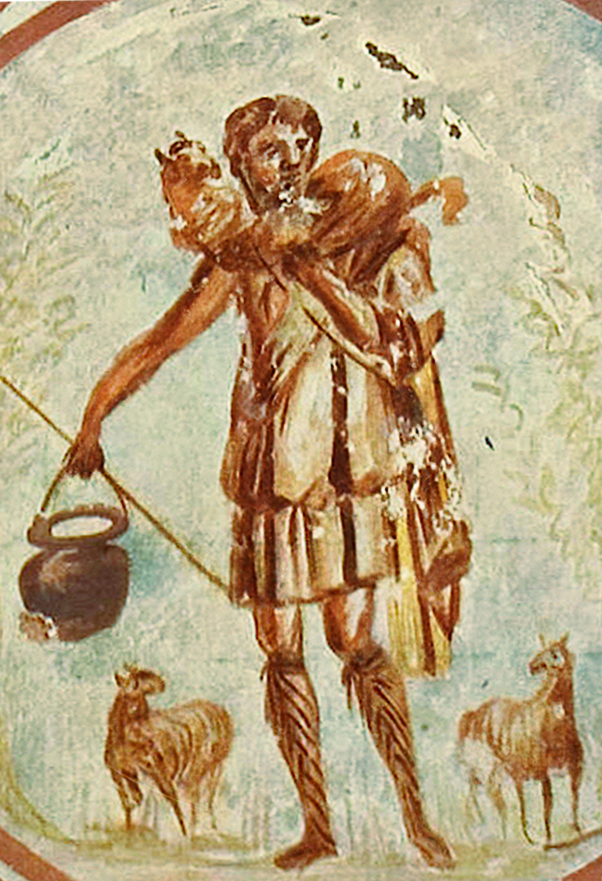
Jesus as the Good Shepherd, painting on ceiling of S. Callisto catacomb, early Christian art, mid 3rd century A.D.. Example of earliest Christian art showing a pastoral scene in the afterlife.

Most Christian denominations hold some belief in an immediate afterlife when people die. Christian scripture gives a few descriptions of an immediate afterlife and a heaven and hell; however, for the most part, both New and Old Testaments focus much more on the myth of a final bodily resurrection than any beliefs about a purely spiritual afterlife away from the body.

Much of the Old Testament does not express a belief in a personal afterlife of reward or punishment:

"All the dead go down to Sheol, and there they lie in sleep together–whether good or evil, rich or poor, slave or free (Job 3:11–19). It is described as a region "dark and deep," "the Pit," and "the land of forgetfulness," cut off from both God and human life above (Psalms 6:5; 88:3–12). Though in some texts Yahweh's power can reach down to Sheol (Psalms 139:8), the dominant idea is that the dead are abandoned forever. This idea of Sheol is negative in contrast to the world of life and light above, but there is no idea of judgment or of reward and punishment."

Later Old Testament writings, particularly the works of the Hebrew prophets, describe a final resurrection of the dead, often accompanied by spiritual rewards and punishments:

"Many who sleep in the dust of the earth shall awake. Some shall live forever; others shall be in everlasting contempt. But the wise shall shine brightly like the splendor of the firmament, and those who lead the many to justice shall be like the stars forever" (Daniel 12:2).

However, even here, the emphasis is not on an immediate afterlife in heaven or hell, but rather on a future bodily resurrection.

The New Testament also devotes little attention to an immediate afterlife. Its primary focus is the resurrection of the dead. Some New Testament passages seem to mention the (non-resurrected) dead experiencing some sort of afterlife (for example, the parable of rich man and Lazarus); yet the New Testament includes only a few myths about heaven and hell. Specifically, heaven is a place of peaceful residence, where Jesus goes to "prepare a home" or room for his disciples (John 14:2). Drawing on scriptural imagery (John 10:7, John 10:11–14), many Christian narratives of heaven include a nice green pasture land and a meeting with a benevolent God. Some of the earliest Christian art depicts heaven as a green pasture where people are sheep led by Jesus as "the good shepherd" as in interpretation of heaven.

As the doctrines of heaven and hell (and also Catholic purgatory) developed, non-canonical Christian literature began to develop an elaborate mythology about these locations. Dante's three-part Divine Comedy is a prime example of such afterlife mythology, describing Hell (in Inferno), Purgatory (in Purgatorio), and Heaven (in Paradiso). Nowadays, conceptualizations of hell differ quite widely across various denominations.

==== Second Coming ====
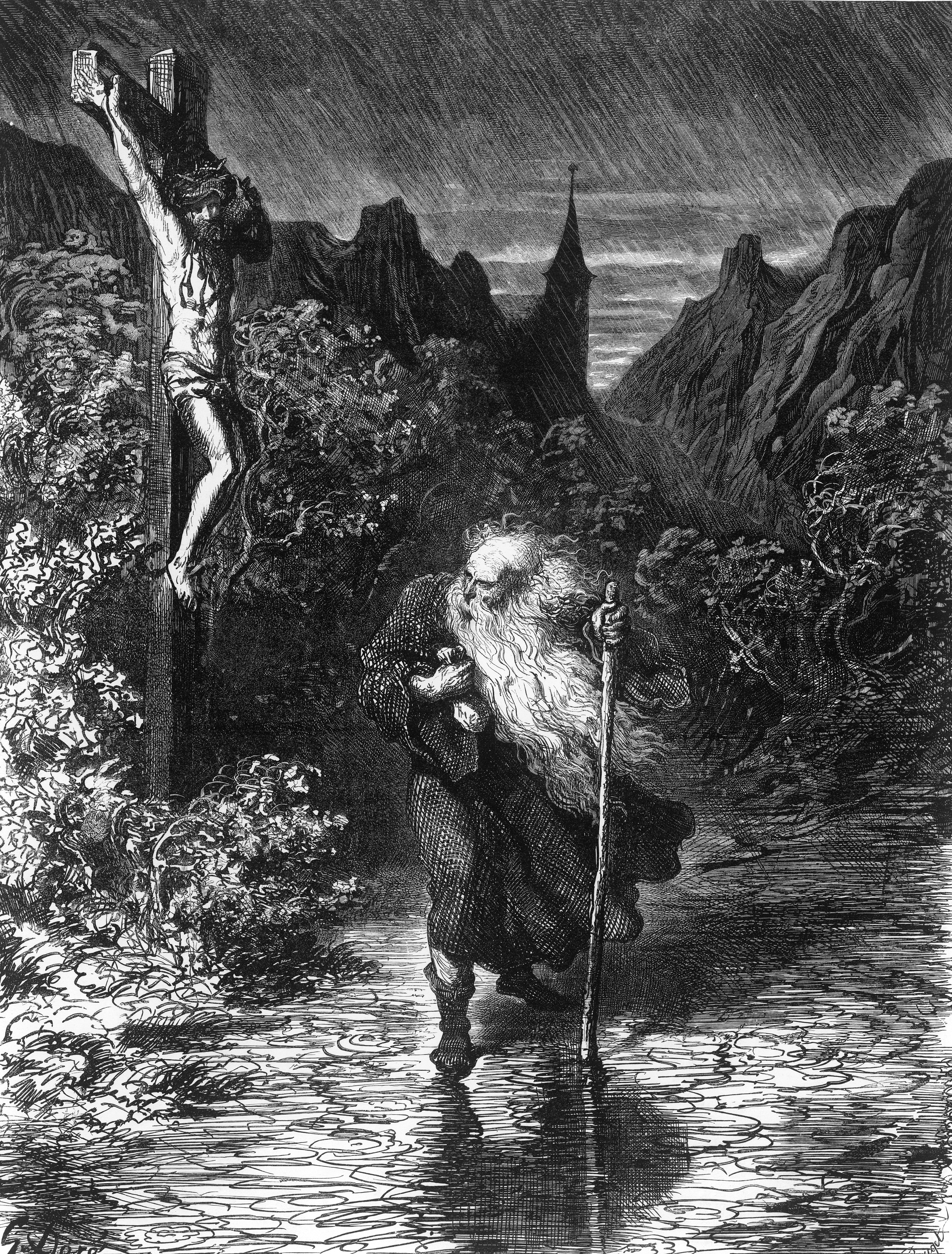
The Wandering Jew by Gustave Doré.

The Second Coming of Christ holds a central place in Christian mythology. The Second Coming is the return of Christ to Earth during the period of transformation preceding the end of this world and the establishment of the Kingdom of Heaven on Earth. According to Matthew's gospel, when Jesus is on trial before the Roman and Jewish authorities, he claims, "In the future you will see the Son of Man sitting at the right hand of the Mighty One and coming on the clouds of heaven." The legend of the Wandering Jew concerns a Jew who taunted Jesus on the way to the Crucifixion and was then cursed to walk the earth until the Second Coming.

==== Resurrection and final judgment ====
Christian mythology incorporates the Old Testament's prophecies of a future resurrection of the dead. Like the Hebrew prophet Daniel (e.g., Daniel 12:2), the Christian Book of Revelation (among other New Testament scriptures) describes the resurrection: "The sea gave up the dead that were in it, and death and Hades gave up the dead that were in them; and they were judged, every one of them according to their deeds." The righteous and/or faithful enjoy bliss in the earthly Kingdom of Heaven, but the evil and/or non-Christian are "cast into the lake of fire".

==== The Kingdom of Heaven on Earth ====
Christian eschatological myths feature a total world renovation after the final judgment. According to the Book of Revelation, God "will wipe every tear from their eyes, and there will be no more death or mourning, wailing or pain, for the old order has passed away". According to Old and New Testament passages, a time of perfect peace and happiness is coming:

"They will beat their swords into plowshares and their spears into pruning hooks. One nation will not raise the sword against another; nor will they train for war again."

Certain scriptural passages even suggest that God will abolish the current natural laws in favor of immortality and total peace:

- "Then the wolf will be a guest of the lamb, and the leopard will lie down with the kid. The calf and the young lion will browse together, with a little child to guide them. [...] There will be no harm or ruin on all my holy mountain, for the earth will be filled with knowledge of the LORD as water fills the sea."
- "On this mountain, [God] will destroy the veil that veils all peoples, the web that is woven over all nations: he will destroy Death forever."
- "The trumpet will sound, and the dead will be raised imperishable, and we will be changed."
- "Night will be no more, nor will they need light from lamp or sun, for the Lord God shall give them light, and they shall reign forever and ever."

==== Millennialism and amillennialism ====
When Christianity was a new and persecuted religion, many Christians believed the end times were imminent. Scholars debate whether Jesus was an apocalyptic preacher; however, his early followers, "the group of Jews who accepted him as messiah in the years immediately after his death, understood him in primarily apocalyptic terms". Prevalent in the early church and especially during periods of persecution, this Christian belief in an imminent end is called "millennialism". (It takes its name from the thousand-year ("millennial") reign of Christ that, according to the Book of Revelation, will precede the final world renovation; similar beliefs in a coming paradise are found in other religions, and these phenomena are often also called "millennialism")

Millennialism comforted Christians during times of persecution, for it predicted an imminent deliverance from suffering. From the perspective of millennialism, human action has little significance: millennialism is comforting precisely because it predicts that happiness is coming no matter what humans do: "The seeming triumph of Evil made up the apocalyptic syndrome which was to precede Christ's return and the millennium."

However, as time went on, millennialism lost its appeal. Christ had not returned immediately, as earlier Christians had predicted. Moreover, many Christians no longer needed the comfort that millennialism provided, for they were no longer persecuted: "With the triumph of the Church, the Kingdom of Heaven was already present on earth, and in a certain sense the old world had already been destroyed." (Millennialism has revived during periods of historical stress, and is currently popular among Evangelical Christians.)

In the Roman Church's condemnation of millennialism, Eliade sees "the first manifestation of the doctrine of [human] progress" in Christianity. According to the amillennial view, Christ will indeed come again, ushering in a perfect Kingdom of Heaven on earth, but "the Kingdom of God is [already] present in the world today through the presence of the heavenly reign of Christ, the Bible, the Holy Spirit and Christianity". Amillennialists do not feel "the eschatological tension" that persecution inspires; therefore, they interpret their eschatological myths either figuratively or as descriptions of far-off events rather than imminent ones. Thus, after taking the amillennial position, the Church not only waited for God to renovate the world (as millennialists had) but also believed itself to be improving the world through human action.

=== Witches ===
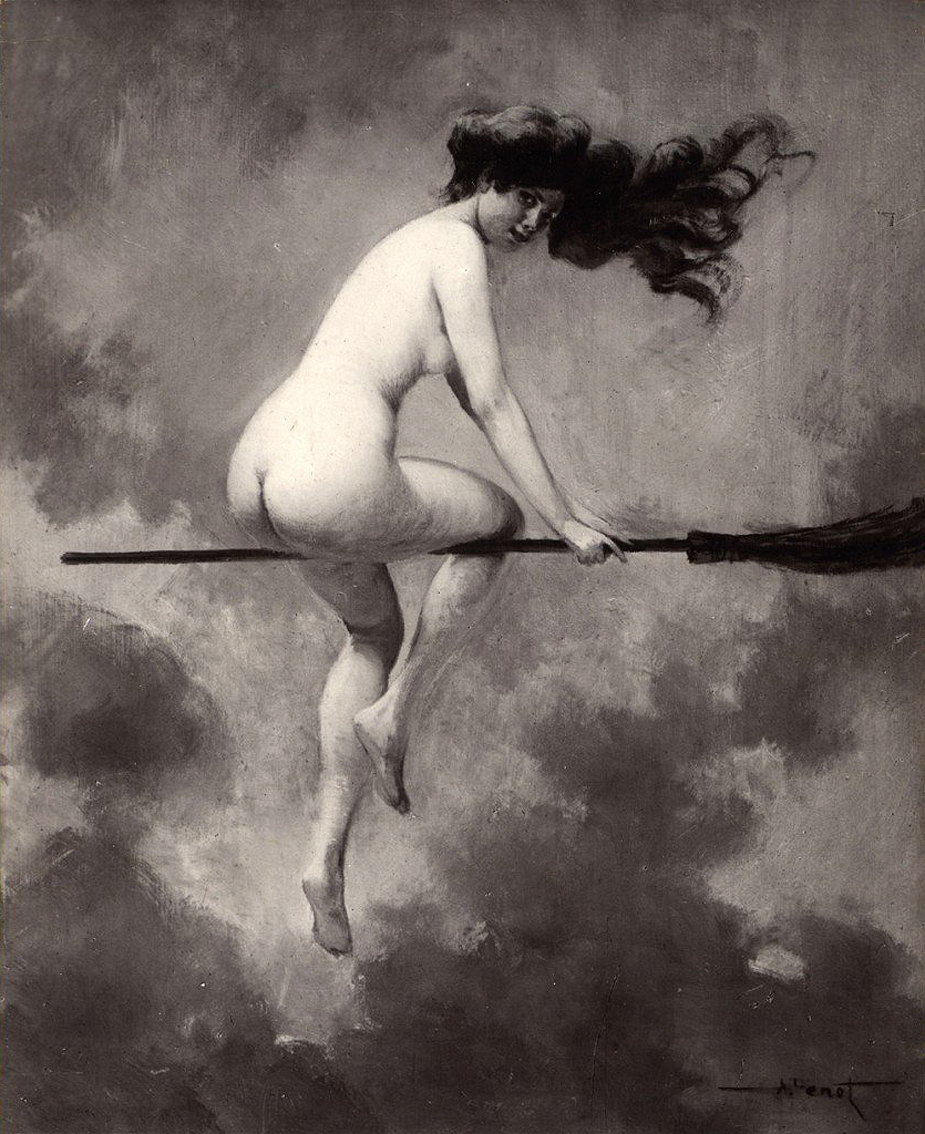
A witch departing for Witches' Sabbath on a broomstick — a motif included in Errores Gazariorum ("Errors of the Gazarii") written in 1437, probably by a Savoyard inquisitor

In the early modern period, distinguished Christian theologians developed elaborated witch mythologies which contributed to the intensification of witch hunts. Major works in Christian demonology, such as Malleus Maleficarum, were dedicated to the implementation of Exodus 22:18 of the Old Testament: "You shall not permit a sorceress to live." The concept of Witches' Sabbath was well articulated by the 17th century. Theologian Martin Delrio was one of the first to provide a vivid description in his influential Disquisitiones magicae:

There, on most occasions, once a foul, disgusting fire has been lit, an evil spirit sits on a throne as president of the assembly. His appearance is terrifying, almost always that of a male goat or a dog. The witches come forward to worship him in different ways. Sometimes they supplicate him on bended knee; sometimes they stand with their back turned to him. They offer candles made of pitch or a child's umbilical cord, and kiss him on the anal orifice as a sign of homage. Sometimes they imitate the sacrifice of the Mass (the greatest of all their crimes), as well as purifying with water and similar Catholic ceremonies. After the feast, each evil spirit takes by the hand the disciple of whom he has charge, and so that they may do everything with the most absurd kind of ritual, each person bends over backwards, joins hands in a circle, and tosses his head as frenzied fanatics do. Then they begin to dance. They sing very obscene songs in his [Satan's] honour. They behave ridiculously in every way, and in every way contrary to accepted custom. Then their demon-lovers copulate with them in the most repulsive fashion.

=== Legend and folklore ===
- Legendary
- Prester John
- Saint George and the Dragon
- Wandering Jew

==== Legendary creatures ====
Numerous legendary creatures exist in Christian mythology. Behemoth is a primeval monster attested in the Book of Job, and is often paired with Leviathan, a sea serpent referred to multiple times in the Old Testament who is a version of the Canaanite Lotan. In addition, a creature known as Ziz is sometimes added to the duo as the king of the birds. A group known as the Nephilim is mentioned in Genesis alongside the "mighty men of old", and are expanded upon in the Book of Enoch as being giant offspring of angels and human women.

== Attitudes toward time ==
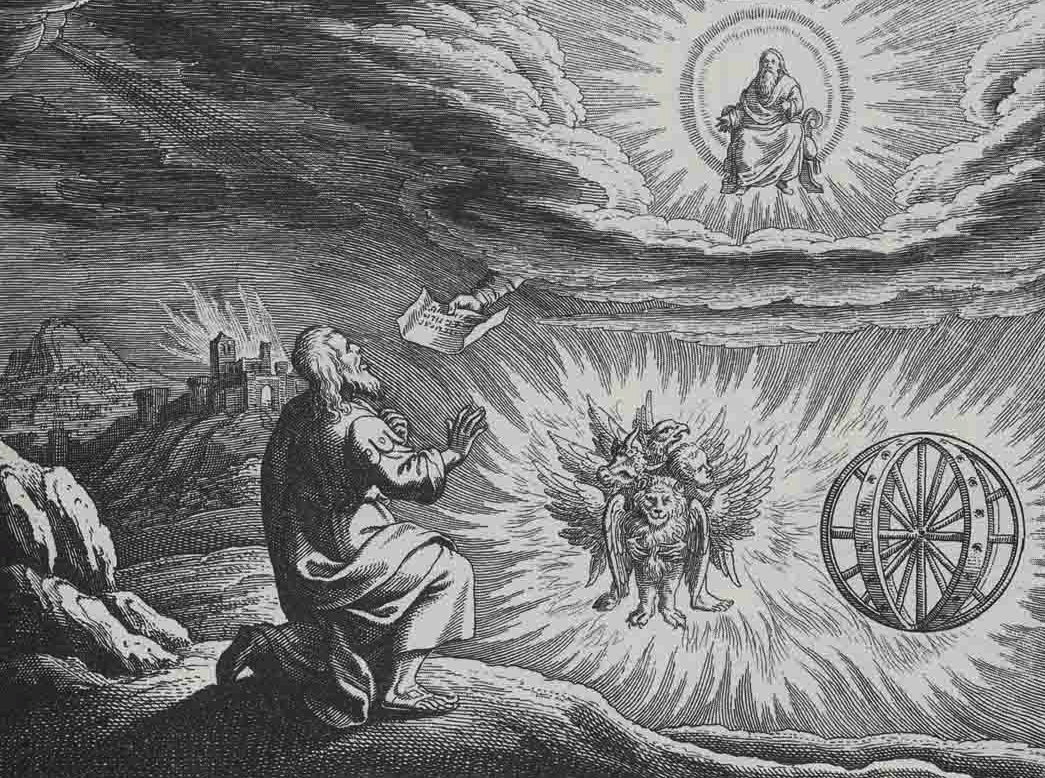
One traditional depiction of the cherubim and chariot vision, based on the description by Ezekiel.

According to Mircea Eliade, many traditional societies have a cyclic sense of time, periodically reenacting mythical events. Through this reenactment, these societies achieve an "eternal return" to the mythical age. According to Eliade, Christianity retains a sense of cyclical time, through the ritual commemoration of Christ's life and the imitation of Christ's actions; Eliade calls this sense of cyclical time a "mythical aspect" of Christianity.

However, Judeo-Christian thought also makes an "innovation of the first importance", Eliade says, because it embraces the notion of linear, historical time; in Christianity, "time is no longer [only] the circular Time of the Eternal Return; it has become linear and irreversible Time". Summarizing Eliade's statements on this subject, Eric Rust writes, "A new religious structure became available. In the Judaeo-Christian religions — Judaism, Christianity, Islam — history is taken seriously, and linear time is accepted. [...] The Christian myth gives such time a beginning in creation, a center in the Christ-event, and an end in the final consummation."

In contrast, the myths of many traditional cultures present a cyclic or static view of time. In these cultures, all the "[important] history is limited to a few events that took place in the mythical times". In other words, these cultures place events into two categories, the mythical age and the present, between which there is no continuity. Everything in the present is seen as a direct result of the mythical age:

"Just as modern man considers himself to be constituted by [all of] History, the man of the archaic societies declares that he is the result of [only] a certain number of mythical events."

Because of this view, Eliade argues, members of many traditional societies see their lives as a constant repetition of mythical events, an "eternal return" to the mythical age:

"In imitating the exemplary acts of a god or of a mythical hero, or simply by recounting their adventures, the man of an archaic society detaches himself from profane time and magically re-enters the Great Time, the sacred time."

According to Eliade, Christianity shares in this cyclic sense of time to an extent. "By the very fact that it is a religion", he argues, Christianity retains at least one "mythical aspect" — the repetition of mythical events through ritual. Eliade gives a typical church service as an example:

"Just as a church constitutes a break in plane in the profane space of a modern city, [so] the service celebrated inside [the church] marks a break in profane temporal duration. It is no longer today's historical time that is present — the time that is experienced, for example, in the adjacent streets — but the time in which the historical existence of Jesus Christ occurred, the time sanctified by his preaching, by his passion, death, and resurrection."

Heinrich Zimmer also notes Christianity's emphasis on linear time; he attributes this emphasis specifically to the influence of Augustine of Hippo's theory of history. Zimmer does not explicitly describe the cyclical conception of time as itself "mythical" per se, although he notes that this conception "underl[ies] Hindu mythology".

Neil Forsyth writes that "what distinguishes both Jewish and Christian religious systems [...] is that they elevate to the sacred status of myth narratives that are situated in historical time".

== Legacy ==
=== Concepts of progress ===
According to Carl Mitcham, "the Christian mythology of progress toward transcendent salvation" created the conditions for modern ideas of scientific and technological progress. Hayden White describes "the myth of Progress" as the "secular, Enlightenment counterpart" of "Christian myth". Reinhold Niebuhr described the modern idea of ethical and scientific progress as "really a rationalized version of the Christian myth of salvation".

According to Irwin, from the perspective of the Hebrew Bible (Old Testament), "history is a tale of progress". Christianity inherited the Hebrew sense of history through the Old Testament. Thus, although most Christians believe that human nature is inherently "fallen" (see original sin) and cannot become perfected without divine grace, they do believe that the world can and will change for the better, either through human and divine action or through divine action alone.

=== Political and philosophical ideas ===
According to Mircea Eliade, the medieval "Gioacchinian myth [...] of universal renovation in a more or less imminent future" has influenced a number of modern theories of history, such as those of Lessing (who explicitly compares his views to those of medieval "enthusiasts"), Fichte, Hegel, and Schelling; and has also influenced a number of Russian writers.

Calling Marxism "a truly messianic Judaeo-Christian ideology", Eliade writes that Marxism "takes up and carries on one of the great eschatological myths of the Middle Eastern and Mediterranean world, namely: the redemptive part to be played by the Just (the 'elect', the 'anointed', the 'innocent', the 'missioners', in our own days the proletariat), whose sufferings are invoked to change the ontological status of the world".

In his article "The Christian Mythology of Socialism", Will Herberg argues that socialism inherits the structure of its ideology from the influence of Christian mythology upon western thought.

In The Oxford Companion to World Mythology, David Leeming claims that Judeo-Christian messianic ideas have influenced 20th-century totalitarian systems, citing the state ideology of the Soviet Union as an example.

According to Hugh S. Pyper, the biblical "founding myths of the Exodus and the exile, read as stories in which a nation is forged by maintaining its ideological and racial purity in the face of an oppressive great power", entered "the rhetoric of nationalism throughout European history", especially in Protestant countries and smaller nations.

=== Christmas stories in popular culture ===
Christmas stories have become prevalent in Western literature and culture.

== The Bible ==
=== Old Testament ===
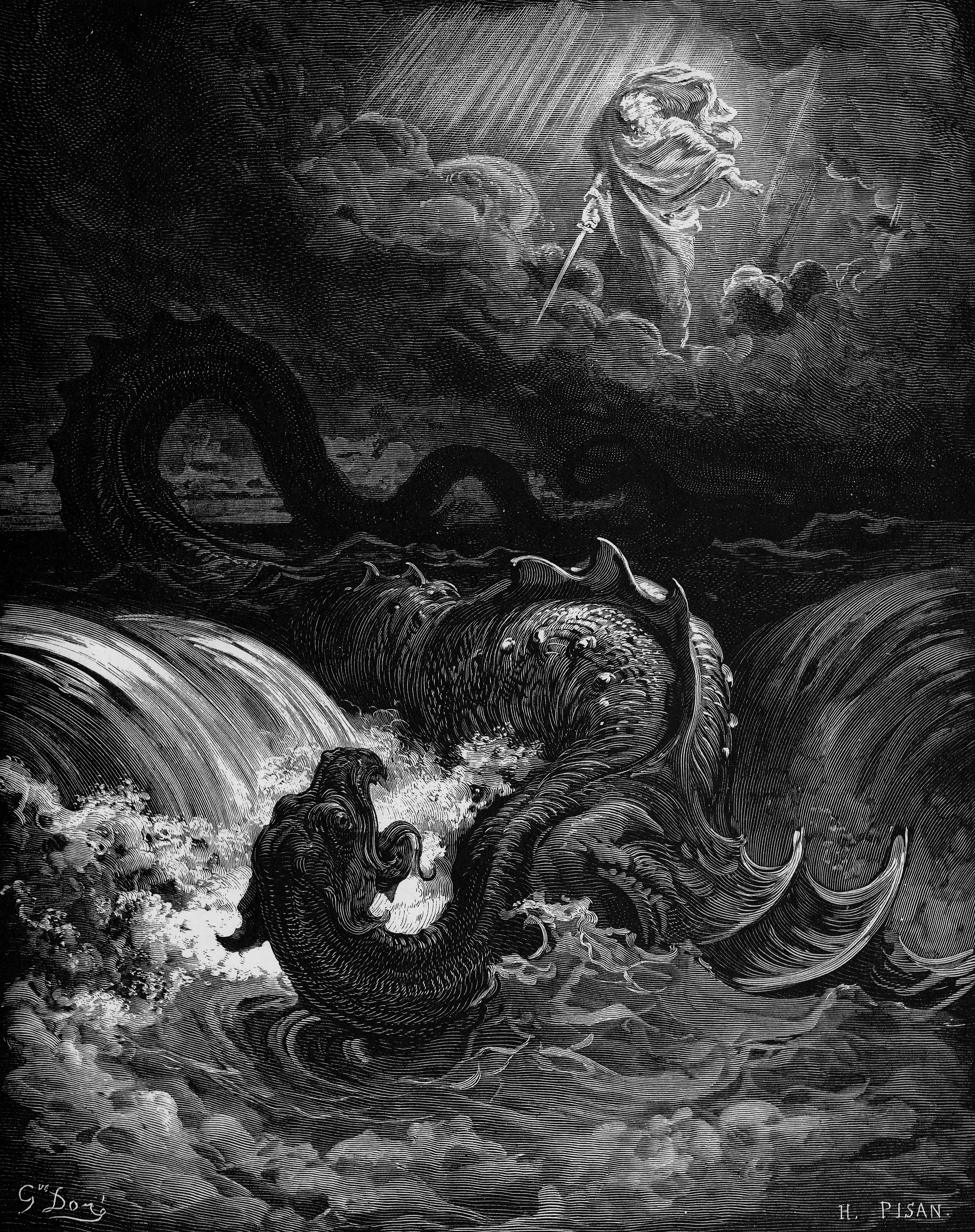
Destruction of Leviathan. 1865 engraving by Gustave Doré

Mythic patterns such as the primordial struggle between good and evil appear in passages throughout the Hebrew Bible, including passages that describe historical events. A distinctive characteristic of the Hebrew Bible is the reinterpretation of myth on the basis of history, as in the Book of Daniel, a record of the experience of the Jews of the Second Temple period under foreign rule, presented as a prophecy of future events and expressed in terms of "mythic structures" with "the Hellenistic kingdom figured as a terrifying monster that cannot but recall [the Near Eastern pagan myth of] the dragon of chaos".

Mircea Eliade argues that the imagery used in some parts of the Hebrew Bible reflects a "transfiguration of history into myth". For example, Eliade says, the portrayal of Nebuchadnezzar as a dragon in Jeremiah 51:34 is a case in which the Hebrews "interpreted contemporary events by means of the very ancient cosmogonico-heroic myth" of a battle between a hero and a dragon.

According to scholars including Neil Forsyth and John L. McKenzie, the Old Testament incorporates stories, or fragments of stories, from extra-biblical mythology. According to the New American Bible, a Catholic Bible translation produced by the Confraternity of Christian Doctrine, the story of the Nephilim in Genesis 6:1–4 "is apparently a fragment of an old legend that had borrowed much from ancient mythology", and the "sons of God" mentioned in that passage are "celestial beings of mythology". The New American Bible also says that Psalm 93 alludes to "an ancient myth" in which God battles a personified Sea. Some scholars have identified the biblical creature Leviathan as a monster from Canaanite mythology. (Note: In a footnote on Psalm 29:3, the New American Bible identifies Leviathan as "the seven-headed sea monster of Canaanite mythology".) (Note: Forsyth 65: "[In Job 26:5–14] Yahweh defeats the various enemies of the Canaanite myths, including Rahab, another name for the dragon Leviathan.") According to Howard Schwartz, "the myth of the fall of Lucifer" existed in fragmentary form in Isaiah 14:12 and other ancient Jewish literature; Schwartz claims that the myth originated from "the ancient Canaanite myth of Athtar, who attempted to rule the throne of Ba'al, but was forced to descend and rule the underworld instead".

Some scholars have argued that the calm, orderly, monotheistic creation story in Genesis 1 can be interpreted as a reaction against the creation myths of other Near Eastern cultures. (Note: David and Margaret Leeming contrast the "structured, majestic, logical, somewhat demythologized" creation story in Genesis 1 with the "high-paced, capricious, ritualistic, magic-filled drama" of other Near Eastern creation myths (Leeming, A Dictionary of Creation Myths, 113-14). They add, "One could [...] say this story was written in reaction to creation myths of nearby cultures [...] In other Near Eastern mythologies, the sun and moon are gods who have names and rule. P [i.e., the hypothesized "Priestly" textual source from which Genesis 1 is drawn] tells of their creation on the fourth day as simply luminaries without name or function except to keep time. [...] While in the Enuma Elish the earth and its inhabitants are created almost haphazardly, as needed, Elohim creates with an unalterable plan in mind" (Leeming, A Dictionary of Creation Myths, 116).) (Note: John L. McKenzie calls Genesis 1 "a deliberate polemic against the [Near Eastern] creation myth. Polytheism is removed, and with it the theogony and the theomachy which are so vital in the Mesopotamian form of the myth. [...] The act of creation is achieved in entire tranquility" (McKenzie 57).) In connection with this interpretation, David and Margaret Leeming describe Genesis 1 as a "demythologized myth", and John L. McKenzie asserts that the writer of Genesis 1 has "excised the mythical elements" from his creation story.

Perhaps the most famous topic in the Bible that could possibly be connected with mythical origins is the topic of Heaven (or the sky) as the place where God (or angels, or the saints) resides, with stories such as the ascension of Elijah (who disappeared in the sky), war of man with an angel, flying angels. Even in the New Testament Paul the Apostle is said to have visited the third heaven, and Jesus was portrayed in several books as going to return from Heaven on a cloud, in the same way he ascended thereto. The official text repeated by the attendees during Roman Catholic mass (the Apostles' Creed) contains the words "He ascended into Heaven, and is Seated at the Right Hand of God, The Father. From thence He will come again to judge the living and the dead".

=== New Testament and early Christianity ===
According to a number of scholars, the Christ story contains mythical themes such as descent to the underworld, the heroic monomyth, and the "dying god" (see section above on "mythical themes and types").

Some scholars have argued that the Book of Revelation incorporates imagery from ancient mythology. According to the New American Bible, the image in Revelation 12:1–6 of a pregnant woman in the sky, threatened by a dragon, "corresponds to a widespread myth throughout the ancient world that a goddess pregnant with a savior was pursued by a horrible monster; by miraculous intervention, she bore a son who then killed the monster". Bernard McGinn suggests that the image of the two Beasts in Revelation stems from a "mythological background" involving the figures of Leviathan and Behemoth.

The Pastoral Epistles contain denunciations of "myths" (muthoi). This may indicate that Rabbinic or Gnostic mythology was popular among the early Christians to whom the epistles were written and that the epistles' author was attempting to resist that mythology. (Note: Barrett 69–71 mentions both Rabbinic and gnostic mythology as a possibility.) (Note: A footnote on 1 Timothy 6:20–21 in the New American Bible refers only to the possibility of gnostic mythology, not of Rabbinic mythology.)

The Sibylline oracles contain predictions that the dead Roman Emperor Nero, infamous for his persecutions, would return one day as an Antichrist-like figure. According to Bernard McGinn, these parts of the oracles were probably written by a Christian and incorporated "mythological language" in describing Nero's return.

== Historical development ==
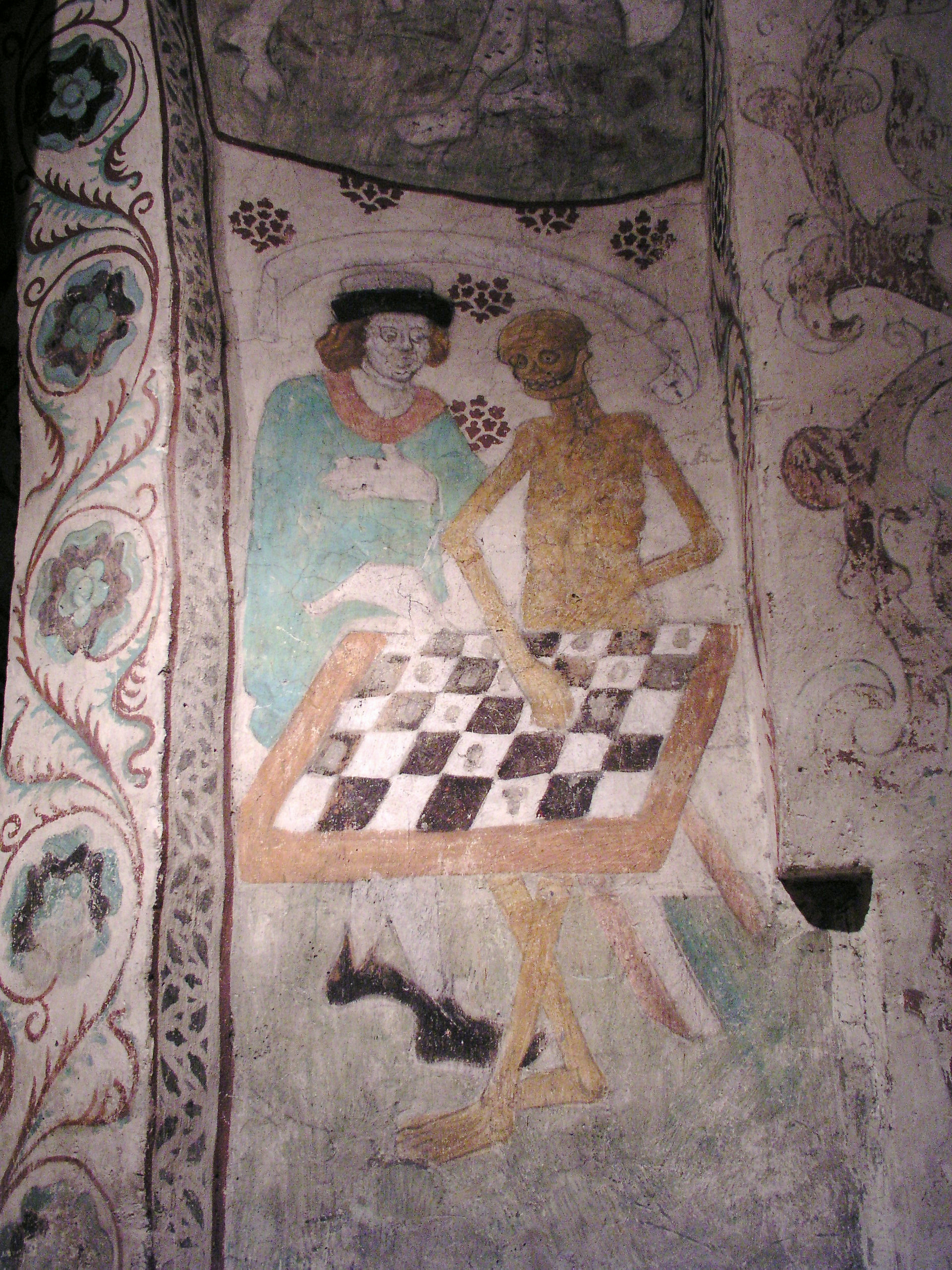
Medieval painting of Death playing chess from Täby Church in Sweden

=== From Roman Empire to Europe ===
After Christian theology was accepted by the Roman Empire, promoted by St. Augustine in the 5th century, Christian mythology began to predominate the Roman Empire. Later the theology was carried north by Charlemagne and the Frankish people, and Christian themes began to weave into the framework of European mythologies. The pre-Christian Germanic and Celtic mythology that were native to the tribes of Northern Europe were denounced and submerged, while saint myths, Mary stories, Crusade myths, and other Christian myths took their place. However, pre-Christian myths never went entirely away, they mingled with the (Roman Catholic) Christian framework to form new stories, like myths of the mythological kings and saints and miracles, for example (Eliade 1963:162–181). Stories such as that of Beowulf and Icelandic, Norse, and Germanic sagas were reinterpreted somewhat, and given Christian meanings. The legend of King Arthur and the quest for the Holy Grail is a striking example. The thrust of incorporation took on one of two directions. When Christianity was on the advance, pagan myths were Christianized; when it was in retreat, Bible stories and Christian saints lost their mythological importance to the culture.

=== Middle Ages ===
According to Mircea Eliade, the Middle Ages witnessed "an upwelling of mythical thought" in which each social group had its own "mythological traditions". Often a profession had its own "origin myth" which established models for members of the profession to imitate; for example, the knights tried to imitate Lancelot or Parsifal. The medieval trouveres developed a "mythology of woman and Love" which incorporated Christian elements but, in some cases, ran contrary to official church teaching.

George Every includes a discussion of medieval legends in his book Christian Mythology. Some medieval legends elaborated upon the lives of Christian figures such as Christ, the Virgin Mary, and the saints. For example, a number of legends describe miraculous events surrounding Mary's birth and her marriage to Joseph. (Note: According to one legend, Anna, Christ's maternal grandmother, initially cannot conceive; in response to Anna's lament, an angel appears and tells her that she will have a child (Mary) who will be spoken of throughout the world (Every 76–77). Some medieval legends about Mary's youth describe her as living "a life of ideal asceticism", fed by angels. In these legends, an angel tells Zacharias, the future father of John the Baptist, to assemble the local widowers; after the widowers have been assembled, some miracle indicates that, among them, Joseph is to be Mary's wife (according to one version of the legend, a dove comes from Joseph's rod and settles on his head) (Every 78).)

In many cases, medieval mythology appears to have inherited elements from myths of pagan gods and heroes. According to Every, one example may be "the myth of St. George" and other stories about saints battling dragons, which were "modelled no doubt in many cases on older representations of the creator and preserver of the world in combat with chaos". Eliade notes that some "mythological traditions" of medieval knights, namely the Arthurian cycle and the Grail theme, combine a veneer of Christianity with traditions regarding the Celtic Otherworld. According to Lorena Laura Stookey, "many scholars" see a link between stories in "Irish-Celtic mythology" about journeys to the Otherworld in search of a cauldron of rejuvenation and medieval accounts of the quest for the Holy Grail.

According to Eliade, "eschatological myths" became prominent during the Middle Ages during "certain historical movements". These eschatological myths appeared "in the Crusades, in the movements of a Tanchelm and an Eudes de l'Etoile, in the elevation of Fredrick II to the rank of Messiah, and in many other collective messianic, utopian, and prerevolutionary phenomena". One significant eschatological myth, introduced by Gioacchino da Fiore's theology of history, was the "myth of an imminent third age that will renew and complete history" in a "reign of the Holy Spirit"; this "Gioacchinian myth" influenced a number of messianic movements that arose in the late Middle Ages.

=== Renaissance and Reformation ===
During the Renaissance, there arose a critical attitude that sharply distinguished between apostolic tradition and what George Every calls "subsidiary mythology"—popular legends surrounding saints, relics, the cross, etc.—suppressing the latter.

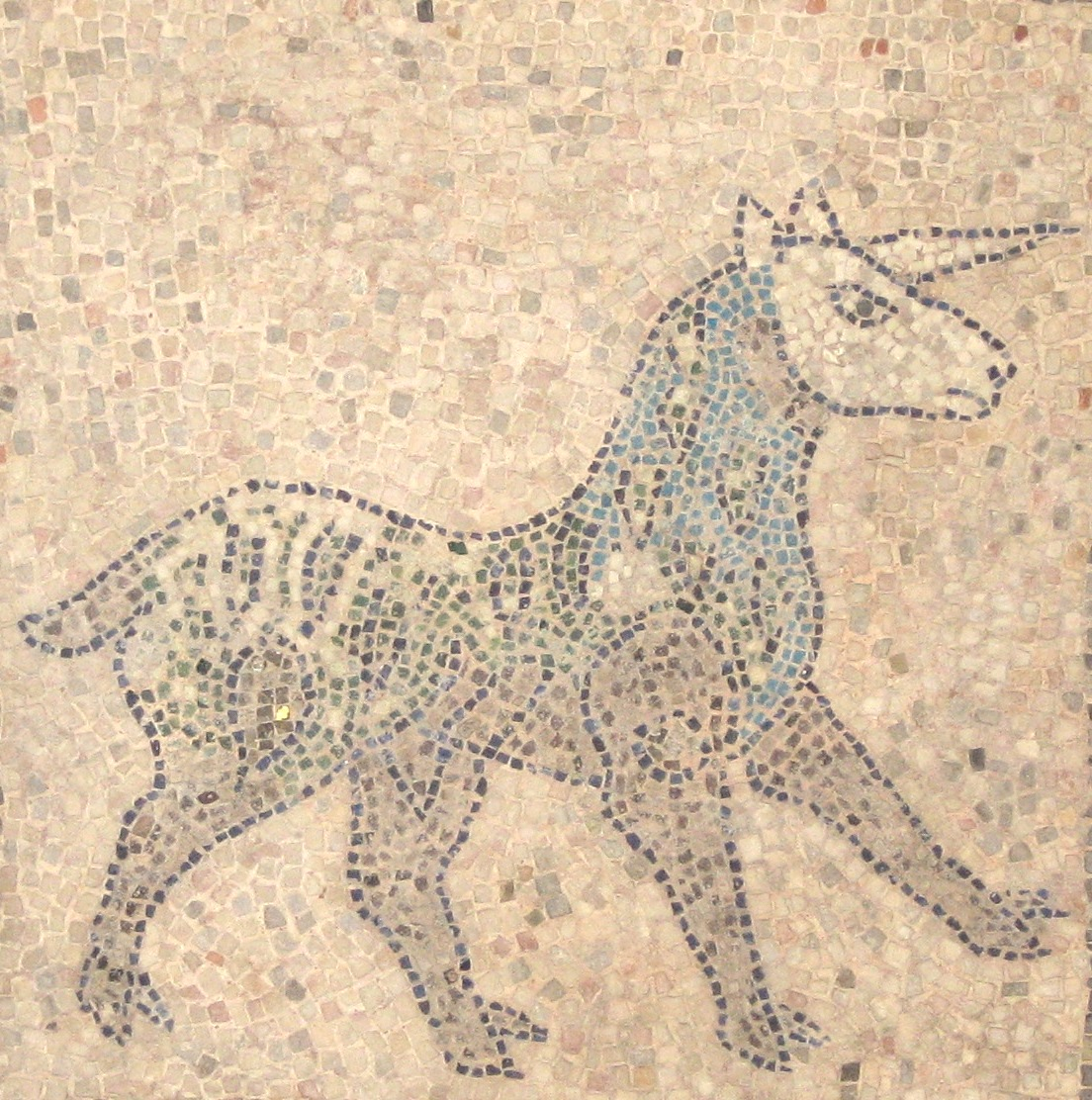
Unicorn mosaic on a 1213 church floor in Ravenna

The works of Renaissance writers often included and expanded upon Christian and non-Christian stories such as those of creation and the Fall. Rita Oleyar describes these writers as "on the whole, reverent and faithful to the primal myths, but filled with their own insights into the nature of God, man, and the universe". An example is John Milton's Paradise Lost, an "epic elaboration of the Judeo-Christian mythology" and also a "veritable encyclopedia of myths from the Greek and Roman tradition".

According to Cynthia Stewart, during the Reformation, the Protestant reformers used "the founding myths of Christianity" to critique the church of their time.

Every argues that "the disparagement of myth in our own civilization" stems partly from objections to perceived idolatry, objections which intensified in the Reformation, both among Protestants and among Catholics reacting against the classical mythology revived during the Renaissance.

=== Enlightenment ===
The philosophes of the Enlightenment used criticism of myth as a vehicle for veiled criticisms of the Bible and the church. According to Bruce Lincoln, the philosophes "made irrationality the hallmark of myth and constituted philosophy—rather than the Christian kerygma—as the antidote for mythic discourse. By implication, Christianity could appear as a more recent, powerful, and dangerous instance of irrational myth".

Since the end of the 18th century, the biblical stories have lost some of their mythological basis to western society, owing to the scepticism of the Enlightenment, 19th-century freethinking, and 20th century modernism. Most westerners no longer found Christianity to be their primary imaginative and mythological framework by which they understand the world. However other scholars believe mythology is in our psyche, and that mythical influences of Christianity are in many of our ideals, for example the Judeo-Christian idea of an after-life and heaven. The book Virtual Faith: The Irreverent Spiritual Quest of Generation X by Tom Beaudoin explores the premise that Christian mythology is present in the mythologies of pop-culture, such as Madonna's Like a Prayer or Soundgarden's Black Hole Sun. Modern myths are strong in comic book stories (as stories of culture heroes) and detective novels as myths of good versus evil.

=== Modern period ===
Some commentators have categorized a number of modern fantasy works as "Christian myth" or "Christian mythopoeia". Examples include the fiction of C. S. Lewis, Madeleine L'Engle, J.R.R. Tolkien, and George MacDonald. (Note: An example of this kind of "mythopoeic" literary criticism can be found in Oziewicz 178: "What L'Engle's Christian myth is and in what sense her Time Quartet qualifies as Christian mythopoeia can thus be glimpsed from both critical assessment of her work and her own reflection as presented in interviews and her voluminous non-fiction.")

In The Eternal Adam and the New World Garden, written in 1968, David W. Noble argued that the Adam figure had been "the central myth in the American novel since 1830". (Note: The full title of Noble's book is The Eternal Adam and the New World Garden: The Central Myth in the American Novel since 1830.) As examples, he cites the works of Cooper, Hawthorne, Melville, Twain, Hemingway, and Faulkner.

== See also ==
- Abraham Abulafia
- Allegory in the Middle Ages
- George Arundale
- Biblical cosmology
- Christian mysticism
- Esoteric Christianity
- Folk religion
- Islamic mythology
- Joseph of Arimathea
- Charles Webster Leadbeater
- Mormon folklore
- Panbabylonism
- Superstitions in Muslim societies
