= Eternal return (Eliade) =

Idea proposed by Mircea Eliade

The "eternal return" is an idea for interpreting religious behavior proposed by the historian Mircea Eliade; it is the belief that through ritual practices (sometimes implicitly, but often explicitly) one is able to merge with or return to the "mythical age"—the actual time of one's myths. It should be distinguished from the philosophical concept of eternal return.

== Sacred and profane ==
According to Eliade,

all the definitions given up till now of the religious phenomenon have one thing in common: Each has its own way of showing that the sacred and the religious life are the opposite of the profane and secular life.

This concept had already been extensively formulated by the French sociologist Émile Durkheim in 1912. The scholar Jack Goody posits that it may not be universal.

This sharp distinction between the sacred and the profane is Eliade's trademark theory. According to Eliade, traditional man distinguishes two levels of existence: (1) the Sacred, and (2) the profane world. (Here "the Sacred" can be God, gods, mythical ancestors, or any other beings who established the world's structure.) To traditional man, things "acquire their reality, their identity, only to the extent of their participation in a transcendent reality". Something in our world is only "real" to the extent that it conforms to the Sacred or the patterns established by the Sacred.

Hence, there is profane space, and there is sacred space. Sacred space is space where the Sacred manifests itself; unlike profane space, sacred space has a sense of direction:

In the homogeneous and infinite expanse, in which no point of reference is possible and hence no orientation is established, the hierophany [appearance of the Sacred] reveals an absolute fixed point, a center.

Where the Sacred intersects our world, it appears in the form of ideal models (e.g., the actions and commandments of gods or mythical heroes). All things become truly "real" by imitating these models. Eliade claims: "For archaic man, reality is a function of the imitation of a celestial archetype." As evidence for this view, in The Myth of the Eternal Return, he cites a belief of the Iranian Zurvanites. The Zurvanites believed that each thing on Earth corresponds to a sacred, celestial counterpart: for the physical sky, there is a sacred sky; for the physical Earth, there is a sacred Earth; actions are virtuous by conforming to a sacred pattern. These are some other examples Eliade gives:

According to Mesopotamian beliefs, the Tigris has its model in the star Anunit and the Euphrates in the star of the Swallow. A Sumerian text tells of the "place of the creation of the gods," where "the [divinity of] the flocks and grains" is to be found. For the Ural–Altaic peoples the mountains, in the same way, have an ideal archetype in the sky. In Egypt, places and nomes were named after the celestial "fields": first the celestial fields were known, then they were identified in terrestrial geography.

Further, there is profane time, and there is sacred time. According to Eliade, myths describe a time that is fundamentally different from historical time (what modern man would consider "normal" time). "In short," says Eliade, "myths describe ... breakthroughs of the sacred (or the 'supernatural') into the World". The mythical age is the time when the Sacred entered our world, giving it form and meaning: "The manifestation of the sacred ontologically founds the world". Thus, the mythical age is sacred time, the only time that has value for traditional man.

== Origin as power ==
According to Eliade, in the archaic worldview, the power of a thing resides in its origin, so that "knowing the origin of an object, an animal, a plant, and so on is equivalent to acquiring a magical power over them". The way a thing was created establishes that thing's nature, the pattern to which it should conform. By gaining control over the origin of a thing, one also gains control over the thing itself.

Eliade concluded that, if origin and power are to be the same, "it is the first manifestation of a thing that is significant and valid". The Sacred first manifested itself in the events of the mythical age; hence, traditional man sees the mythical age as the foundation of value.

== Sacred time ==
Eliade's theory implies that as the power of a thing lies in its origin, the entire world's power lies in the cosmogony. If the Sacred established all valid patterns in the beginning, during the time recorded in myth, then the mythical age is sacred time—the only time that contains any value. Man's life only has value to the extent that it conforms to the patterns of the mythical age.

The religion of the Australian Aboriginals is supposed to contain many examples of the veneration paid to the mythical age. Just before the dawn of the first day, the Bagadjimbiri brothers emerged from the Earth in the form of dingos, and then turned into human giants whose heads touched the sky. Before the Bagadjimbiri came, nothing had existed. But when the sun rose, and the brothers began naming things, the "plants and animals began really to exist". The brothers met a group of people and organized them into a civilized society. The people of this tribe—the Karadjeri of Australia—still imitate the two brothers in many ways:

One of the Bagadjimbiri stopped to urinate ... That is the reason why the Australian Karadjeri stop and take up a special position in order to urinate. ... The brothers stopped and ate a certain grain raw; but they immediately burst into laughter, because they knew that one ought not eat it so ... and since then men imitate them whenever they have this grain cooked. The Bagadjimbiri threw a primal (a kind of large baton) at an animal and killed it—and this is how men have done it ever since. A great many myths describe the manner in which the brothers Bagadjimbiri founded all the customs of the Karadjeri, and even their behavior.

The mythical age was the time when the Sacred appeared and established reality. For traditional man, Eliade argues, (1) only the first appearance of something has value; (2) only the Sacred has value; and, therefore, (3) only the first appearance of the Sacred has value. Because the Sacred first appeared in the mythical age, only the mythical age has value. According to Eliade's hypothesis, "primitive man was interested only in the beginnings ... to him it mattered little what had happened to himself, or to others like him, in more or less distant times". Hence, traditional societies express a "nostalgia for the origins", a yearning to return to the mythical age. To traditional man, life only has value in sacred time.

== Myths, rituals, and their purpose ==
Eliade also explained how traditional man could find value for his own life (in a vision of where all events occurring after the mythical age cannot have value or reality); he indicated that, if the Sacred's essence lies only in its first appearance, then any later appearance must actually be the first appearance. Thus, an imitation of a mythical event is actually the mythical event itself, happening again—myths and rituals carry one back to the mythical age:

In imitating the exemplary acts of a god or of a mythic hero, or simply by recounting their adventures, the man of an archaic society detaches himself from profane time and magically re-enters the Great Time, the sacred time.

Myth and ritual are vehicles of "eternal return" to the mythical age. Traditional man's myth- and ritual-filled life constantly unites him with sacred time, giving his existence value. As an example of this phenomenon, Eliade cites church services, by which churchgoers "return" to the sacred time of Scripture:

Just as a church constitutes a break in plane in the profane space of a modern city, [so] the service celebrated inside [the church] marks a break in profane temporal duration. It is no longer today's historical time that is present—the time that is experienced, for example, in the adjacent streets—but the time in which the historical existence of Jesus Christ occurred, the time sanctified by his preaching, by his passion, death, and resurrection.

== Cyclic time ==
Eliade attributes the well-known "cyclic" view of time in ancient thought to the eternal return. In many religions, a ritual cycle correlates certain parts of the year with mythical events, making each year a repetition of the mythical age. For instance, Australian Aboriginal peoples annually reenact the events of the "Dreamtime":

The animals and plants created in illo tempore by the Supernatural Beings are ritually re-created. In Kimberley the rock paintings, which are believed to have been painted by the Ancestors, are repainted in order to reactivate their creative force, as it was first manifested in the mythical times, at the beginning of the World.

Every New Year, the people of Mesopotamia reenacted the Enuma Elish, a creation myth, in which the god Marduk slays Tiamat, the primordial monster, and creates the world from her body. They correlated the birth of the year with the mythical birth of the world.

By periodically bringing man back to the mythical age, these liturgical cycles turn time itself into a circle. Those who perform an annual ritual return to the same point in time every 365 days: "With each periodical [ritual] festival, the participants find the same sacred time—the same that had been manifested in the festival of the previous year or in the festival of a century earlier."

According to Eliade, some traditional societies express their cyclic experience of time by equating the world with the year:

In a number of North American Indian languages the term world (= Cosmos) is also used in the sense of year. The Yokuts says "the world has passed," meaning "a year has gone by." For the Yuki, the year is expressed by the words for earth or world. ... The cosmos is conceived [of] as a living unity that is born, develops, and dies on the last day of the year, to be reborn on New Year's Day. ... At every New Year, time begins ab initio.

The New Year ritual reenacts the mythical beginning of the cosmos. Therefore, by the logic of the eternal return, each New Year is the beginning of the cosmos. Thus, time flows in a closed circle, always returning to the sacred time celebrated during the New Year: the cosmos's entire duration is limited to one year, which repeats itself indefinitely.

These ritual cycles do more than give humans a sense of value. Because traditional man identifies reality with the Sacred, he believes that the world can endure only if it remains in sacred time. He periodically revives sacred time through myths and rituals in order to keep the universe in existence. In many cultures, this belief appears to be consciously held and clearly stated. From the perspective of these societies, the world must be periodically renewed or it may perish. The idea that the Cosmos is threatened with ruin if not annually re-created provides the inspiration for the chief festival of the California Karok, Hupa, and Yurok tribes. In the respective languages the ceremony is called "repair" or "fixing" of the world, and, in English, "New Year". Its purpose is to re-establish or strengthen the Earth for the following year or two years.

== Human creativity ==
To some, the theory of the eternal return may suggest a view of traditional societies as stagnant and unimaginative, afraid to try anything new. However, Eliade argues that the eternal return does not lead to "a total cultural immobility". If it did, traditional societies would never have changed or evolved, and "ethnology knows of no single people that has not changed in the course of time". The mere fact that traditional societies have colonized new lands and invented new technologies proves that the eternal return hasn't suppressed their sense of initiative.

Far from suppressing creativity, Eliade argues, the eternal return promotes it:

There is no reason to hesitate before setting out on a sea voyage, because the mythical Hero has already made [such a voyage] in the fabulous Time. All that is needed is to follow his example. Similarly, there is no reason to fear settling an unknown, wild territory, because one knows what to do. One has merely to repeat the cosmogonic ritual, whereupon the unknown territory (= "Chaos") is transformed into "Cosmos".

According to Eliade, traditional man has endless creative possibilities because "the possibilities for applying the mythical model are endless".

== "Terror of History" ==
According to Eliade, this yearning to remain in the mythical age causes a "terror of history". Traditional man desires to escape the linear march of events, empty of any inherent value or sacrality. In Chapter 4 of The Myth of the Eternal Return (entitled "The Terror of History") and in the appendix to Myths, Dreams and Mysteries, Eliade suggests that the abandonment of mythical thought and the full acceptance of linear, historical time, with its "terror", is one of the reasons for modern man's anxieties. Traditional societies escape this anxiety to an extent, as they refuse to completely acknowledge historical time. Eliade describes the difference between ancient and modern man's reactions to history, as well as modern man's impotence before the terror of history, as follows:

In our day, when historical pressure no longer allows any escape, how can man tolerate the catastrophes and horrors of history—from collective deportations and massacres to atomic bombings—if beyond them he can glimpse no sign, no transhistorical meaning; if they are only the blind play of economic, social, or political forces, or, even worse, only the result of the 'liberties' that a minority takes and exercises directly on the stage of universal history?

We know how, in the past, humanity has been able to endure the sufferings we have enumerated: they were regarded as a punishment inflicted by God, the syndrome of the decline of the "age," and so on. And it was possible to accept them precisely because they had a metahistorical meaning ... Every war rehearsed the struggle between good and evil, every fresh social injustice was identified with the sufferings of the Saviour (or, for example, in the pre-Christian world, with the passion of a divine messenger or vegetation god), each new massacre repeated the glorious end of the martyrs. ... By virtue of this view, tens of millions of men were able, for century after century, to endure great historical pressures without despairing, without committing suicide or falling into that spiritual aridity that always brings with it a relativistic or nihilistic view of history

== Terror of the eternal return ==
In general, according to Eliade, traditional man sees the eternal return as something positive, even necessary. However, in some religions, such as Buddhism and certain forms of Hinduism, the traditional cyclic view of time becomes a source of terror:

In certain highly evolved societies, the intellectual élites progressively detach themselves from the patterns of traditional religion. The periodical resanctification of cosmic time then proves useless and without meaning. ... But repetition emptied of its religious content necessarily leads to a pessimistic vision of existence. When it is no longer a vehicle for reintegrating a primordial situation ... that is, when it is desacralized, cyclic time becomes terrifying; it is seen as a circle forever turning on itself, repeating itself to infinity.

When the world becomes desacralized, the traditional cyclic view of time is too firmly entrenched to simply vanish. It survives, but in a profane form (such as the myth of reincarnation). Time is no longer static, as for the Karadjeri, for whom almost every action imitates a mythical model, keeping the world constantly in the mythical age. Nor is time cyclical but sacred, as for the ancient Mesopotamians, whose ritual calendar periodically returned the world to the mythical age. Rather, for some Dharmic religions, "time was homologized to the cosmic illusion (māyā)".

For most of traditional humanity, linear history is profane, and sacredness lies in cyclic time. But, in Buddhism, Jainism, and some forms of Hinduism, even cyclic time has become profane. The Sacred cannot be found in the mythical age; it exists outside all ages. Thus, human fulfilment does not lie in returning to a sacred time, but in escaping from time altogether, in "a transcendence of the cosmos." In these religions, the "eternal return" is less like the eternal return in most traditional societies (for whom time has an objective beginning, to which one should return) and more like the philosophical concept of eternal return—an endless cosmic cycle, with no beginning and, thus, no inherently sacred time.

== Scholarly criticism ==
Although immensely influential in religious studies, the ideas behind Eliade's hypothesis of the eternal return are less well accepted in anthropology and sociology. According to the classicist Geoffrey Kirk, this is because Eliade overextends the application of his ideas: for example, Eliade claims that the modern myth of the "noble savage" results from the religious tendency to idealize the primordial, mythical age. Kirk claims that Eliade's relative unpopularity among anthropologists and sociologists also results from Eliade's assumption—essential for belief in the eternal return as Eliade formulates it—that primitive and archaic cultures had concepts such as "being" and "real", although they lacked words for them.

Kirk thinks Eliade's theory of eternal return applies to some cultures. Specifically, he agrees that Australian Aborigines used myths and rituals "to bring the Dreamtime" (the Australian mythical age) "into the present with potent and fruitful results". However, Kirk argues, Eliade takes this Australian phenomenon and applies it to other cultures uncritically. In short, Kirk sees Eliade's theory of eternal return as a universalization of the Australian Dreamtime concept.

As two counterexamples to the eternal return, Kirk cites Native American mythology and Greek mythology. The eternal return is nostalgic: by retelling and reenacting mythical events, Australian Aborigines aim to evoke and relive the Dreamtime. However, Kirk believes that Native American myths "are not evocative or nostalgic in tone, but tend to be detailed and severely practical". In many Native American mythologies, animals once acted like humans, during the mythical age; but they don't any longer: the division between animals and men is now a firm one, and according to Kirk, "that in itself reduces the effectiveness of myth-telling as a reconstitution" of the mythical age. As for Greek myths, many of them fall outside any sacred age of origins: this challenges Eliade's claim that almost all myths are about origins, and that people retell and reenact myths to return to the time of origins. (Note that the classicist Kirk uses a much broader definition of "myth" than many professional folklorists. According to the classical definition used by folklorists, many Greek stories conventionally called "myths" are not myths, precisely because they fall outside a sacred age of origins.)

Even Wendy Doniger, a religious-studies scholar and Eliade's successor at the University of Chicago, claims (in the Introduction to Eliade's own Shamanism) that the eternal return does not apply to all myths and rituals, although it may apply to many of them.

== References in popular culture ==
In T. A. Barron's The Lost Years of Merlin (the "Sacred Time" chapter), Merlin's mother says that "stories"—specifically, myths—are "real enough to help [her] live. And work. And find the meaning hidden in every dream, every leaf, every drop of dew." She states that "they dwell in sacred time, which flows in a circle. Not historical time, which runs in a line."

Jean Cocteau's screenplay for L'Éternel retour portrays the timeless nature of the myth of Tristan and Isolde.

The symphonic metal band Therion released "Eternal Return" on their 2000 album "Deggial." The song is thematically in line with Eliade's concept of the eternal return and would seem to be inspired by it.

In Milan Kundera's book, The Unbearable Lightness of Being, the author fixates around the theme of eternal return. This is especially evident in his exploration of the concept of lightness.

== See also ==
- Correspondence (theology)
- Meta-historical fall
