= Merlin Book 10: Shadows on the Stars =

2005 novel by T. A. Barron

- Shadows on the Stars Cover
- Author: T. A. Barron
- Original title: The Great Tree of Avalon: Shadows on the Stars
- Illustrator: David Elliot
- Cover artist: Larry Rostant and Tony Sahara
- Language: English
- Series: Merlin Saga
- Genre: Fantasy
- Publisher: Penguin Young Readers Group
- Publication date: 6 October 2005
- Publication place: United States
- Media type: Print (Hardback & Paperback)
- Pages: 430 (hardcover edition)
- ISBN: 0-399-23764-X
- OCLC: 58832613
- LC Class: PZ7.B27567 Sha 2005
- Preceded by: Merlin Book 9: The Great Tree of Avalon
- Followed by: Merlin Book 11: The Eternal Flame
- Website: Shadows on the Stars

Shadows on the Stars is a fantasy novel by T. A. Barron, published by Penguin Young Readers Group. The book is the tenth novel in the 12-book series known as Merlin Saga. It was originally published as The Great Tree of Avalon: Shadows on the Stars, the second novel in The Great Tree of Avalon trilogy, and is set in a world made up of a great tree and its seven roots inhabited by creatures.

== Plot summary ==
In the previous book, Merlin Book 9: The Great Tree of Avalon, the evil sorcerer Kulwych made a pure crystal of élano out of the water from the White Geyser of Crystillia. Élano is the most powerful substance in Avalon and is known for its power to create life. At the beginning of Shadows on the Stars, the wicked spirit Rhita Gawr corrupted this pure crystal of élano and thereby transformed into an anti-matter-like version of itself, called vengélano, which destroys whatever it touches.

Facing this danger, the three young heroes, Tamwyn, Elli, and Scree, must push their abilities to their limit to save Avalon. Tamwyn must somehow find and relight the darkened stars of the constellation Wizard's Staff. Elli must seek the crystal of vengélano and destroy it. Scree must confront his greatest mistake, which nearly cost him his life and the staff of Merlin, to help defeat Rhita Gawr's army.

Tamwyn, accompanied by Henni the hoolah and the small, winged creature called Batty Lad, leaves Avalon's root-realms – the seven familiar sections of Avalon, home to the greatest diversity of lifeforms – and enters the trunk and is separated from his friends. He discovers, among other things, growth rings of the Tree that tell its history; places where giant termites dwell; and the Ayanowyn, whose once glorious society has become a dystopia. When living with the Ayanowyn, Tamwyn learns that if a wreath of mistletoe were to appear among them, the one to whom it appeared would become their leader. While leaving the Ayanowyn to continue his travels, Tamwyn finds such a wreath and leaves it with his former host.

Because, as a rule, humans think of trees as being wooden, the description of Avalon's trunk as being essentially made of stone and consisting of such topography as exists in our real world creates some ambiguity. In Avalon's tree-world, a knothole becomes a valley, and the outside of the trunk becomes similar to a cliff, or to Amara, though Avalon's surface is less steep than Amara's.

In or near Merlin's Knothole, Tamwyn meets Ethaun, a blacksmith and the sole survivor of his father Krystallus' expedition to the stars. Ethaun shelters Tamwyn, reforges Tamwyn's broken dagger, brings him to visit Krystallus' grave, and gives him a globular compass. Tamwyn eventually discovers the stars that illuminate Avalon, occupying the niche held by the Sun in our world, and the niche held by the stars of our night sky, are "doors of fire" that lead to other worlds including ours and the spirits' Otherworld. To rekindle the constellation Wizard's Staff, Tamwyn must shut the doors of which it is made.

Elli, accompanied by Nuic, Shim, Brionna, and a priest of the order to which Elli belongs, called Lleu, seek the aid of the water dragons. When the aid comes slowly, they leave via the portals that link the seven root-realms; mistakenly to the realm Malóch, where they learn that Elli's former tormentor Llynia is part of a eugenic, genocidal effort to impose human rule. Escaping from Llyina's clutches with the help of a gnome whose life Elli had saved in the previous book, they continue with greater urgency.

In a dream created by Tamwyn's magic, he and Elli meet on a cloud. There he gives her a half-finished harp in replacement of the one he broke. In exchange, they kiss.

Scree returns to Rahnawyn, the realm of his birth and learns eaglefolk clan called Bram Kaie is destroying other eaglefolk. Having experienced their cruelty firsthand, Scree attacks the renegade clan alone. He has previously met their leader, Quenakhya, who had seduced Scree to seize the magic staff Ohnyalei. When he understood this, Scree had fled. On returning, he watches as Quenakhya's son challenges and kills her for leadership. Scree immediately challenges and kills him. On her last breaths, the dying Quenakhya reveals that Scree is the father of the warrior whom he has slain. Ashamed of himself, but cognisant of necessity, Scree takes the leadership of Bram Kaie.

== Characters ==
- Tamwyn: A young man who has for the majority of his lifetime lived in the realm of Rahnawyn with an adopted brother, Scree. He has suspicions that he might be the Dark Child, as he is 17 years old and seems to think there is a hidden darkness in him. His name means Dark Flame in the language of the flamelons, his mother's people. His father is Krystallus, Merlin's explorer son. Although they have never met, Tamwyn seeks to follow in his father's footsteps by traveling to the stars, even before learning of his father's identity. Has feelings for Elliryana.
- Elliriyanna Lailoken/Elli: A young trainee at the Society of the Whole. Her parents were killed in gnome raids; she was herself kept in slavery for the majority of her life, clinging to the only remnant of her parents: a harp made by her father that was accidentally destroyed by Tamwyn the first day they met. After escaping shortly before the events of the first book took place, she goes to the Drumadian compound to become a priestess, hoping to follow in her father's footsteps. Her memories continue to haunt her. Has feelings for Tamywn.
- Nuic: Elli's faithful maryth; one of the diverse creatures voluntarily bound in partnership to Drumadian priests and priestesses. He is an old creature, often referring to ancient events at which he was present. He is a small pinnacle sprite; a rotund mountain-dweller whose color changes according to his thoughts and emotions. He is often sarcastic and impatient, though he is wise and witty. Nuic is said to have been the maryth to Rhia, daughter of the Drumadian founder.
- Kulwych: An evil sorcerer who desires to gain totalitarian control of Avalon. He especially hates Merlin and wishes to rid Avalon of that wizard's image. He is shown to be a servant of Rhita Gawr. Kulwych is known as White Hands, due to the fact that he hides his battle-scarred body beneath a cloak, allowing only his perfectly white hands to show. His plan involves the creation of a dam by which to capture the water of Geyser Crystillia, wherein is eláno enough to make a crystal. He plans then to corrupt the crystal, making it a thing of destruction rather than creation. Having done so, he is reduced to Rhita Gawr's second-in-command.
- Brionna: A young elf from El Urien who is captured by White Hands' arms master, Harlech. She is forced to work on Kulwych's dam. Later, Kulwych blackmails her into stealing the staff Ohnyalei from Scree, who has been its keeper, by threatening the life of her grandfather Tressimir. Brionna obeys, fearing to lose her grandfather. She meets and befriends Shim. Brionna, having stolen Ohnyalei, is betrayed by Kulwych. She later abets the destruction of his dam. Brionna accompanies Elli on the quest to destroy the crystal of vengeláno. It is implied that she has feelings for Scree.
- Scree: An eagleman who is Tamwyn's half-brother. Becomes leader of the eagle clan. Has feelings for Brionna.

=== Supporting characters ===
- Shim: A giant who has been reduced to the size of a dwarf, not once but twice, having grown to giant-size in between. He is as old as Avalon itself. Shim is a friend of Merlin's, encountered first in The Lost Years. In The Great Tree of Avalon, he befriends Brionna. Shim always speaks with a particular mannerism, distinguished by his haphazard use of suffices and his use of synonymous adjectives such as "certainly, definitely, absolutely" in trios. He calls Brionna his "niece".
- Henni: Henni is a hoolah; a mischievous, reckless, comical person who sees life as a game. He enjoys seeing people become frustrated or hot-tempered, because they are then excited and therefore appear absurd to him. He fulfills this liking by joining the travelling group consisting of Elli, Nuic, Llynia, Llynia's maryth Fairlyn, and Tamwyn, whom he teases relentlessly. Henni, for his part, becomes more sober as a result of his experiences of violence and danger. Although Tamwyn presumes him dead after their involuntary separation en route to the stars, it is implied at the end of the book that he is still alive.
- Llynia: A priestess of the Society of the Whole. Llynia is excessively arrogant, egocentric, and anthropocentric. She torments Elli constantly and abuses all whom she meets, except the gardener Hanwan Bellamir, who is as anthropocentric as she despite his gentler demeanor. Later, she joins the anthropocentric movement "Humanity First", which seeks to impose human rule on all nonhuman life.
- Batty Lad: A small, green-eyed, bat-like creature who joins Tamwyn. Batty Lad is happy-go-lucky, cheerful, and talkative. He speaks very quickly, with a tendency toward colorful language. His origins are implied to be of great significance. Although Tamwyn presumes him dead after their involuntary separation en route to the stars, it is implied at the end of the book that he is still alive.
- Rhiannon: T. A. Barron's re-invention of the Lady of the Lake. Rhia, as she is sometimes called, is vital, optimistic, friendly, humorous, courteous, compassionate, wise, and skilled in magical arts. She is very much in touch with nature, though at times she surrenders to her frustrations. She is Merlin's sister and Tamwyn's great-aunt.
- Krystallus Eopia: Though he did not actually take action in the book, Krystallus was often mentioned. Son of the wizard Merlin and deer-woman Hallia, Krystallus was a great explorer who died on his greatest expedition, the journey to the stars; he never made it to the stars, and it is said that he mostly died of grief for the wife and child he thought he lost. The Lady of the Lake revealed to Tamwyn that Krystallus was his father in book one.
- Deth Macoll: An assassin and master of disguise. Poses as a jester to infiltrate Elli's party. Later reveals himself, only to fall to his death.
- Olewyn: Though not named until Shadows on the Stars, he is quite prominent in both books. Appearing several times, he is a mysterious bard whose knowledge of the status quo far exceeds that which he chooses to reveal. He is notable for his broad, white beard; for his skills of music and poetry; and for the creature called a museo, which dwells in his hat. This creature possesses the most musical voice of all voices in Avalon.

== The Seven Root Realms ==
The Great Tree of Avalon splits into seven roots (realms):

- Airroot (Y Swylarna)
- Mudroot (Maloch)
- Stoneroot (Olanabram)
- Waterroot (Brynchilla)
- Fireroot (Rahnawyn)
- Shadowroot (Lastrael)
- Woodroot (El Urien)

Each is named for the primary component of its environments.

== See also ==
- Merlin Book 9: The Great Tree of Avalon, previous book in the series
- Merlin Book 11: The Eternal Flame, next book in the series
