= T. A. Barron =

American writer (born 1952)

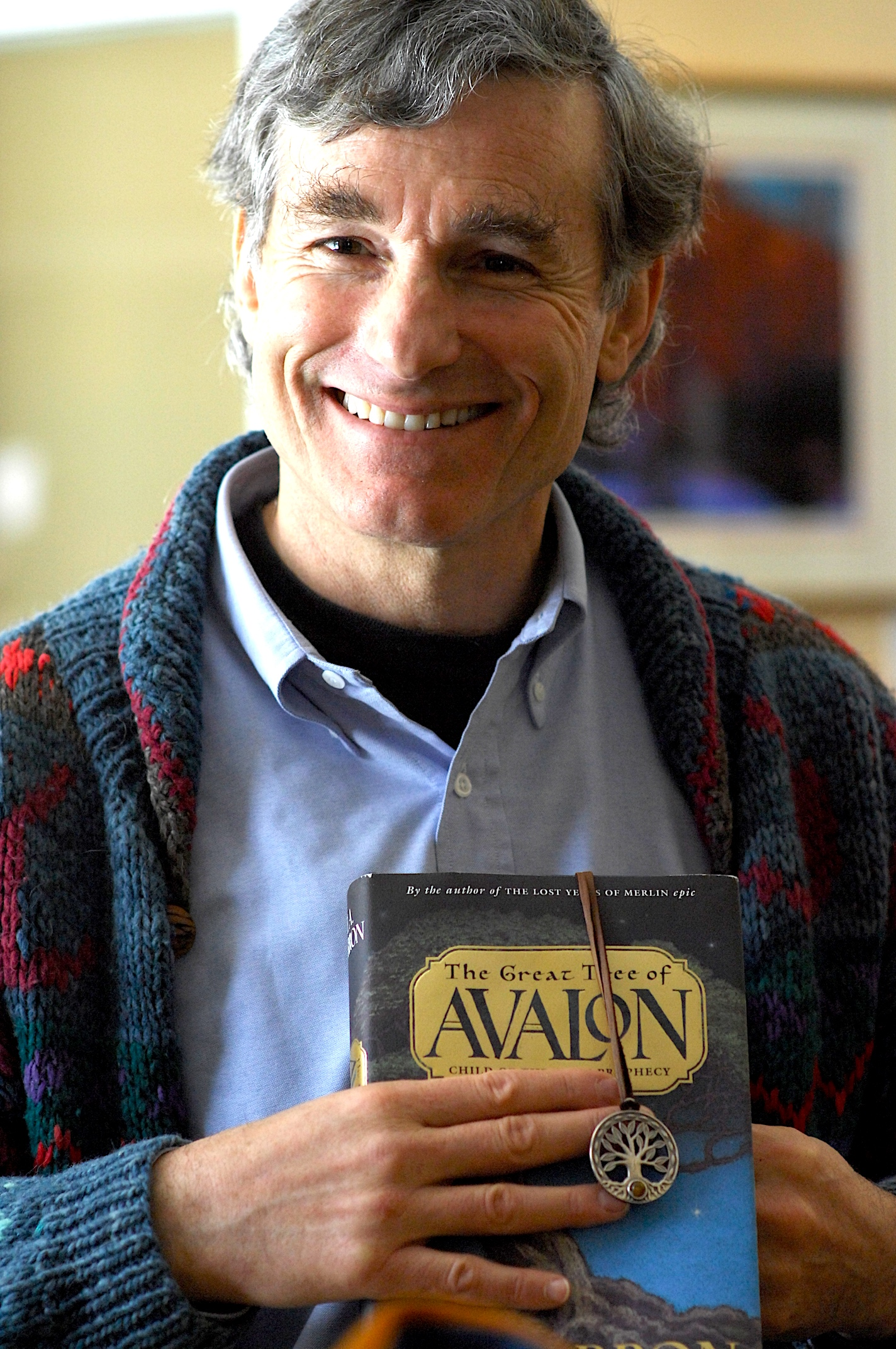
- Barron in 2008
- Born: Thomas Archibald Barron; March 26, 1952 (age 74); Boston, Massachusetts, U.S.
- Education: Princeton University; Harvard University
- Occupation: Novelist
- Writing career
- Language: English
- Genres: Fantasy, self help, science fiction, nature
- Notable works: The Merlin Saga (13 books); The Atlantis Saga trilogy; The Hero's Trail; Naming Nature
- Website: tabarron.com

Thomas Archibald Barron (born March 26, 1952) is an American writer of fantasy literature, books for children and young adults, and nature books.

== Biography ==
Barron spent his early childhood in Harvard, Massachusetts, a town with lots of apple orchards and New England history (including the childhood home of Louisa May Alcott). His family moved to Colorado and he spent much of his youth on a ranch in the Rocky Mountains. Barron's writing reflects his great passion for nature and the spiritual values of the natural world, as well as his belief in the power of every person to matter and make a difference.

He studied history and politics at Princeton University before he won a Rhodes Scholarship to attend Oxford University. He also has business and law degrees from Harvard University. To further his education, he spent a year traveling with his backpack around Europe, Asia, and Africa. He served as president of a private equity firm in New York City before changing careers in 1990, when he returned to Colorado with his wife, Currie, and their children to become a full-time writer and conservationist.

Since then, he has written more than thirty novels, children's books, non-fiction books, and nature books. In 2011, he received The de Grummond Medallion for "lifetime contribution to the field of children's and young adult literature." He has also won the Nautilus Award Grand Prize, and many other literary awards.

He is actively involved with environmental and conservation organizations, including World Wildlife Fund, The Wilderness Society, Earthjustice, Wildlife Conservation Society, The Nature Conservancy, Alaska Conservation Foundation, and Colorado Open Lands.

In 2001, he founded a national prize to celebrate outstanding young people, who help other people or the environment—the Gloria Barron Prize for Young Heroes (named after his mother). He has produced a documentary film, “Dream Big”, as well as several highly acclaimed videos that honor extraordinary young people of diverse backgrounds for his Inspiring Young Heroes website. He won a Telly Award in 2020 for excellence in video production in the Social Impact category.

To support the experience of Rhodes Scholars at Oxford, he created the Travel Program for Environmental Stewardship, which enables young leaders from around the world to visit inspiring wilderness regions like Patagonia. In addition, he supported the program for character, service, and leadership for Rhodes Scholars.

At Princeton University, where he served as a Trustee, Barron created the Barron Family Fund for Innovations in Environmental Studies, which assists faculty and students involved in the environment and humanities, as well as the Prize for Environmental Leadership given to students who demonstrate outstanding initiative in environmental issues. All this builds on Barron's work decades earlier to help found the High Meadows Environmental Institute. He and his wife also created the Thomas A. and Currie C. Barron Family Biodiversity Research Fund which supports research to protect different species and ecosystems. In addition, he created the Henry David Thoreau Freshman Seminar in Environmental Writing.

Beyond his support of the Rhodes Scholarships and Princeton, T. A. Barron has worked to advance education and environmental protection. At World Wildlife Fund, he helped to establish the Boundless fellowship program, a global program to support young environmental leaders. He created scholarships for environmental law at Harvard University, as well as scholarships for students in environmental studies at University of California Santa Barbara. He also created scholarships for creative writing at Vermont College of Fine Arts and at Hamline University, and an internship for the conservation of ancient manuscripts at Oxford University's Bodleian Library. In addition, he founded the Youth in Wilderness program at The Wilderness Society, as well as the organization's scholarships for graduate students working to advance the cause of conservation. Recently, The Wilderness Society honored him with the Robert Marshall Award, its highest award given to citizens active in conservation.

== Writer ==
In many of his novels, Barron writes about nature and ecology in mythical settings. Inspired by nature's power of renewal as well as humanity's power to make meaningful choices, he says, "I truly believe every person can make a difference — that's why I'm drawn to heroic quest stories." His books have received the Nautilus Award Grand Prize for literature that helps to renew the spirit and envision a better world, as well as many other awards from the American Library Association, and the International Literacy Association. The Merlin Saga (13 titles) and the novel The Ancient One have been international best sellers; The Great Tree of Avalon trilogy has been a New York Times best seller.

According to Booklist, his books are "completely magical" and "will enchant readers." The New York Times has called his work "august" and "compelling". Fellow author Isabel Allende has said his writing is "brilliant—a real gift." In the same spirit, author Madeleine L'Engle called his stories "a crescendo of miracles." Fellow writer Terry Tempest Williams has hailed him as the creator of "environmental fables for our time." Robert Coles, M.D. praised his work by saying, "Here is so much grace." And writer Lloyd Alexander called his books "an intense and profoundly spiritual adventure."

Jane Goodall praised T. A. Barron’s book Naming Nature, describe it as "a celebration of nature's beauty, a love poem to language, and a plea to save the environment for all living creatures." She called it "an inspiring book for all to treasure!”

His podcast, Magic and Mountains: The T. A. Barron Podcast, illuminates the magic of Merlin, the wonders and challenges of nature, the experience of creative writing, the inspiration of young heroes, and the invitation to everyone to see your life as a story.

== Adaptations ==
Disney film studios is currently developing a film adaptation of The Merlin Saga. In November 2015, Philippa Boyens was hired to write the script. Ridley Scott was in talks about directing it in 2018. By October 2021, Michael Matthews was attached to direct it, and Gil Netter was set as the film's producer.

== Works ==
=== Adventures of Kate books ===
- The Heartlight Saga (Combined edition) (2013)
- Heartlight (1990) (Illustrated by Anne Yvonne Gilbert in 2003)
- The Ancient One (1992) (Illustrated by Anne Yvonne Gilbert in 2004)
- The Merlin Effect (1994)

=== The Atlantis Saga ===
- Atlantis Rising (2013)
- Atlantis in Peril (2015)
- Atlantis Lost (2016)
- Never Again: The Origins of Grukkar (eBook) (2017)

=== The Merlin Saga ===
The Merlin Saga (2021) is a 13-book series originally sold as three separate series: The Lost Years of Merlin epic, Merlin's Dragon trilogy, and The Great Tree of Avalon trilogy. It also includes the prequel, GIANT (2021). The final book in the series is The Book of Magic, an encyclopedia of the characters and places in the series.

Prequel

- GIANT (2021)

The Lost Years of Merlin Epic

- Merlin Book 1: The Lost Years; originally issued as The Lost Years of Merlin (1996)
- Merlin Book 2: The Seven Songs; originally issued as The Seven Songs of Merlin (1997)
- Merlin Book 3: The Raging Fires; originally issued as The Fires of Merlin (1998)
- Merlin Book 4: The Mirror of Fate; originally issued as The Mirror of Merlin (1999)
- Merlin Book 5: A Wizard's Wings; originally issued as The Wings of Merlin (2000)

Merlin's Dragon Trilogy

- Merlin Book 6: The Dragon of Avalon; originally issued as Merlin's Dragon (2008)
- Merlin Book 7: Doomraga's Revenge (2009)
- Merlin Book 8: Ultimate Magic (2010)

The Great Tree of Avalon Trilogy

- Merlin Book 9: The Great Tree of Avalon; originally issued as Child of the Dark Prophecy (2004)
- Merlin Book 10: Shadows on the Stars (2005)
- Merlin Book 11: The Eternal Flame (2007)

The Book of Magic

- Merlin Book 12: Merlin: The Book of Magic (2011), companion to the Merlin Saga

=== Other fiction books ===
- Tree Girl (2001)
- Ben Barron: How the Boy Became King of Shadows

=== Picture books ===
- Where is Grandpa? (1999)
- High as a Hawk (2004)
- The Day the Stones Walked (2007)
- Ghost Hands (2011)

=== Books to Inspire (Nonfiction) ===
- The Hero's Trail: True Stories of Young People to Inspire Courage, Compassion, and Hope (2015)
- The Wisdom of Merlin (2015)

=== Adult Nonfiction ===
- Naming Nature (2026)

=== Nature books ===
- To Walk In Wilderness (1993)
- Rocky Mountain National Park: A 100 Year Perspective (1995)

=== Podcast ===
- Magic & Mountains: The T. A. Barron Podcast (2022)

== Other sources ==
- "T. A. Barron Author Documentary
- "Jane Goodall on the Barron Prize for Young Heroes
- "Jane Goodall on T. A. Barron's Books
- "It's Only Natural: T.A. Barron follows his passion on a literary quest", Interview by Linda Castellitto
- "T. A. Barron receives the de Grummond Medallion
