= Merlin Book 5: A Wizard's Wings =

2000 children's fantasy novel by T. A. Barron

- A Wizards Wings Cover
- Author: T. A. Barron
- Original title: The Wings of Merlin
- Language: English
- Series: Merlin Saga
- Genre: Fantasy
- Publisher: Penguin Group USA
- Publication date: 2000
- Publication place: United States
- Media type: Print (Hardcover)
- Pages: 352 pp (hardcover edition)
- ISBN: 0-399-23456-X
- OCLC: 44128693
- LC Class: PZ7.B27567 Wi 2000
- Preceded by: Merlin Book 4: The Mirror of Fate
- Followed by: Merlin Book 6: The Dragon of Avalon
- Website: A Wizard's Wings

A Wizard's Wings is a children's fantasy novel by T. A. Barron. A Wizard's Wings is the fifth book in a 12-book series known as The Merlin Saga. This book was originally published as The Wings of Merlin, the final book in the five-book series The Lost Years of Merlin, which provides a childhood story for Merlin, the legendary Arthurian wizard.

In the series, Merlin searches for his true identity while overcoming perilous odds as he learns to use his powers for good and discovers his strengths and weaknesses. Merlin is also given the task of ending evil in the land and finds out secrets of his past that change his life. In A Wizard's Wings, winter approaches, and Merlin must quickly unify Fincayra's dwarves, canyon eagles, walking trees and other creatures against an invasion by Rhita Gawr while a mysterious killer hunts down the children of Fincayra.
