= Merlin Book 2: The Seven Songs =

1997 novel by T. A. Barron

- Merlin Book 2: The Seven Songs Cover
- Author: T. A. Barron
- Original title: The Seven Songs of Merlin
- Language: English
- Series: The Merlin Saga
- Genre: Fantasy
- Publisher: Penguin
- Publication date: 1997
- Publication place: U.S.A.
- Media type: Print (Hardcover)
- Pages: 336 pp (hardcover edition)
- ISBN: 978-0-399-25021-7
- Preceded by: Merlin Book 1: The Lost Years
- Followed by: Merlin Book 3: The Raging Fires
- Website: The Seven Songs

Merlin Book 2: The Seven Songs is a fantasy novel by T. A. Barron, published by Philomel Books in 1997. The Seven Songs is the second book in a 12-book series known as The Merlin Saga. This book was originally published as The Seven Songs of Merlin, book two of The Lost Years of Merlin epic, a 5-book series. These books chronicle the childhood of Merlin.

== Plot summary ==
Young Merlin has brought new hope to Fincayra, the enchanted isle that lies between earth and sky. Having finally freed it from the terrible Blight, Merlin and the forest girl Rhia set out to heal the land using the magical Flowering Harp. But Fincayra remains in great danger still — and the first victim of the renewed tide of evil is Merlin's own mother.

To save his mother's life, Merlin must master the Seven Songs of Wizardry, passed down from his grandfather Tuatha, a wizard in Fincayra. He can then travel to the Otherworld of the spirits to obtain the Elixir of Dagda. To accomplish this, he must defeat Balor, an ogre whose glance is fatal, and learn to see with his heart rather than his eyes.

=== The Seven Songs ===
The Seven Songs refer to the seven major arts of Wizardry. These arts are Changing, Binding, Protecting, Naming, Leaping, Eliminating, and Seeing. A song written on the walls inside Arbassa (Merlin's Sister's Home, an Oak Tree) by Merlin's grand father Tuatha tells of these seven arts and it is only by finding the "Souls of the Songs" that Merlin can begin to master these arts and venture into the Otherworld to retrieve the cure for his Mother.
