= Merlin Book 4: The Mirror of Fate =

1999 fantasy novel by T. A. Barron

- The Mirror of Fate Cover
- Author: T. A. Barron
- Original title: The Mirror of Merlin
- Language: English
- Series: Merlin Saga
- Genre: Fantasy
- Publisher: Penguin
- Publication date: 1999
- Publication place: U.S.A.
- Media type: Print (Hardcover)
- Pages: 245 pp (hardcover edition)
- ISBN: 0-399-23455-1
- OCLC: 40925815
- LC Class: PZ7.B27567 Mi 1999
- Preceded by: Merlin Book 3: The Raging Fires
- Followed by: Merlin Book 5: A Wizard's Wings
- Website: The Mirror of Fate

The Mirror of Fate is a 1999 fantasy novel by T. A. Barron published by Penguin. The Mirror of Fate is the fourth book in a 12-book series known as The Merlin Saga. This book was originally published as The Mirror of Merlin, book four of The Lost Years of Merlin epic, a 5-book series providing a childhood story for the legendary Merlin, wizard of Arthurian legend.

In a remote swamp on the magical isle of Fincayra, uncommon wickedness arises. Young Merlin must journey to terrifying places - both within himself as well as on land - to save both his homeland, and his own destiny.

Accompanied by the deer-woman he has come to love, Hallia, and his own roguish shadow, Merlin discovers "a magical mirror that can alter anyone's fate." The person Merlin beholds upon gazing into the mirror is the person he least expects to find.
