= Merlin Book 3: The Raging Fires =

Fantasy novel about Merlin battling raging fires

- Merlin Book 3: The Raging Fires Cover
- Author: T. A. Barron
- Original title: The Fires of Merlin
- Illustrator: Larry Rostant
- Cover artist: Tony Sahara
- Language: English
- Series: Merlin Saga
- Genre: Fantasy
- Publisher: Penguin
- Publication date: 1998
- Publication place: U.S.A.
- Media type: Print (Hardcover)
- Pages: 261 pp (hardcover edition)
- ISBN: 0-399-23020-3
- OCLC: 38090925
- LC Class: PZ7.B27567 Fi 1998
- Preceded by: Merlin Book 2: The Seven Songs
- Followed by: Merlin Book 4: The Mirror of Fate
- Website: The Raging Fires

The Raging Fires is a fantasy novel by T. A. Barron originally published by Penguin in 1998. The Raging Fires is the third book in a 12-book series known as The Merlin Saga. This book was originally published as The Fires of Merlin, book three of The Lost Years of Merlin epic, a 5-book series providing a childhood story for the legendary Merlin, wizard of Arthurian legend.

Wings of Fire, the once-sleeping dragon, now threatens Fincayra with his raging fury. Merlin, whose magical powers are new and unproven, is the only one who can stop him - though it could cost the young wizard his life.

Before facing the dragon's fires, Merlin must confront several others: the dreaded kreelixes, who live to devour magic; the mysterious Wheel of Wye; the sorceress Domnu, who holds the treasured Galator; and perhaps most importantly and most challenging, those fires within himself.
