= Merlin Book 1: The Lost Years =

1996 novel by T. A. Barron

- Author: T. A. Barron
- Original title: The Lost Years of Merlin
- Language: English
- Series: Merlin Saga
- Genre: Fantasy
- Publisher: Penguin Group USA
- Publication date: 1996
- Publication place: United States
- Media type: Print (Hardcover)
- Pages: 326 pp (hardcover edition)
- ISBN: 0-399-23018-1
- OCLC: 34357368
- LC Class: PZ7.B27567 Lo 1996
- Preceded by: First in series
- Followed by: Merlin Book 2: The Seven Songs
- Website: The Lost Years

The Lost Years (originally entitled The Lost Years of Merlin) is a novel by T. A. Barron, published by Penguin Group USA about the legendary wizard Merlin's youth. The book is the first in the 12-book Merlin Saga, and was originally published as The Lost Years of Merlin, book one of the Lost Years of Merlin 5-book series.

== Plot ==
In the beginning, a young boy has just regained consciousness and finds he, along with a woman with long blond hair and a tattered blue tunic, are washed up on a beach. The boy encounters a boar as he is walking toward the woman, which tries to attack him and the woman. It charges at the boy while he tries to drag the woman into a hollowed out tree trunk. He puts the woman in first, then tries to fit himself in but is too big to fit. A stag leaps from the forest and stands between him and the boar. The stag and the boar fight. Angrily, the boar retreats. The stag and the boar go away, and soon the woman regains consciousness. The woman declares herself the boy's mother, and that her name is Branwen and his is Emrys. Years later, Emrys finds that he has magical powers and eventually uses them to defend Branwen against a terrorizing bully who is trying to burn her at the stake. Emrys then uses his powers to will an old tree to fall on the bully, trapping him in the fire.

Emrys, in his attempt to save the bully, goes blind from the fire, but learns to see through a visual "second sight", after swearing never to use his powers again. After learning to sense well enough to be mobile, Emrys leaves Branwen at the monastery where he had been treated for his burns and sets out to find his true home.

Emrys builds a raft and floats all the way to the magical and mythical island of Fincayra, which is somewhere between heaven and earth, also called the "in between," place, with only the bag of herbs his mother gives him and the Galator, which is a pendant whose powers are described as "vast beyond knowing".

There he meets Rhiannon, a girl who seeks his assistance in stopping the terrible blight which is now beginning to kill the forest she lives in. Emrys initially refuses, intent on discovering who he is and regaining the lost memories of his childhood, but when the two are attacked by goblins and Rhia tricks them into kidnapping her instead of him because he won't use his powers to save them both, he vows to save her. Along with a dwarf-sized giant, Shim, Emrys sets out to the Shrouded Castle to rescue her.

He learns, from a wise bard named Cairpre, that Branwen really was his mother, but her real name is Elen. He also learns his father serves the king and was turned evil by the troublesome Rhita Gawr, a spirit who wants to control Fincayra before moving on to Earth. Cairpre suggests that he visit the dangerous wagerer Domnu, who may be able to help them reach the castle. Emrys plays her game and wagers the only thing of value he has, the Galator, which he has since learned is the one treasure King Stangmar, under the control of Rhita Gawr, doesn't have, and it is more powerful than all the treasures he does. Domnu shrinks him and Shim to allow them to fly on the back of Trouble, Emrys' merlin (bird), to the castle, where he realizes that his own father is the king who has made a deal to kill him for the safety of his mother in a deal made with Rhita Gawr.

With the help of his friends, Emrys completes a prophecy from ancient times and destroys the castle and the hold that Rhita Gawr has on Fincayra. Both Trouble and Shim sacrifice themselves, the former by attacking Gawr and pushing him back into the otherworld, and the second by throwing himself into the Cauldron of Death. But because he went in willingly, Shim destroys the Cauldron and grows to his true size as a giant. Stangmar, the king is locked up.

In the aftermath, Rhia suggests that if Emrys doesn't feel as if he has his true name, maybe he should go by the name Merlin. Emrys agrees to try the name out for a while.

== Critical reception ==
Publishers Weekly said of the novel, "Readers may find this attempt to create a biography for Merlin less of an organic novel than a showcase for the author's deft recycling of Welsh myth." Kirkus Reviews said that it "transforms the early years of the mythical wizard's life into a vivid, action-filled fantasy, replete with deep forests, ruined castles, and evil spells: a promising first installment of a projected trilogy."
