= Eternal flame (disambiguation) =

An eternal flame is a memorial consisting of a perpetually burning flame.

Eternal flame or eternal fire may also refer to:

== Memorials ==
- Eternal Flame (Azerbaijan)
- Eternal Flame (Bangladesh)
- Eternal Flame (Belgrade)
- Eternal flame (Sarajevo)
- John F. Kennedy Eternal Flame

== Books ==
- The Eternal Flame (novel), the second book in the Orthogonal trilogy by Greg Egan
- Merlin Book 11: The Eternal Flame, the third book in The Great Tree of Avalon trilogy by T. A. Barron
- Eternal flame, a short story of Andrzej Sapkowski in Sword of Destiny book

== Music ==
- Eternal Flame (album), by Do As Infinity
- Eternal Flame (band), a Dutch rock band
- "The Eternal Flame", a song from the 2005 album The Circle of Life by Freedom Call
- "Eternal Flame" (song), a 1988 song by The Bangles
- "Eternal Flame", a song by Mystic Prophecy from the album Regressus
- "Eternal Fire", a song from the 2017 album Berserker by Beast in Black

== Other ==
- Eternal Flame Falls, a waterfall in New York State, USA, which features a natural gas flame
- Shalleh-ye Javiyd (English: Eternal Flame), a Maoist political party in Afghanistan
- Eternal Fire (film), a 1985 Spanish film
- The Eternal Flame (film), a 1922 silent film
- Eternal Fire (esports), a Turkish esports organization

== See also ==
- The Eternal Frame, 1975 artwork
- Eternal light (disambiguation)
- Sacred fire (disambiguation)
