= Matt Focht =

American singer

Matthew David Focht is an American musician originally from Omaha, Nebraska. He is best known as the lead singer and rhythm guitarist in the Chicago-based band Head of Femur. Matt is currently working on a record with his wife, Crystal Hartford, for the band, Hartford/Focht. Also playing drums in Omaha band, High Up.

Previously, he played with Bright Eyes, Pablo's Triangle, The Holy Ghost, and Opium Taylor.

== Album Appearances ==
- Bright Eyes - Letting Off the Happiness (1998 · Saddle Creek)
- Bright Eyes - There Is No Beginning to the Story (2002, Saddle Creek)
- Bright Eyes - Lifted or The Story is in the Soil, Keep Your Ear to the Ground (2002 · Saddle Creek)
- Head of Femur - Ringodom or Proctor (2003 · Greyday Productions)
- Head of Femur - Hysterical Stars (2005 · spinART)
- Head of Femur - Great Plains (2008 · Greyday Productions)
