= Lux perpetua =

Lux Perpetua (Latin, 'eternal light') may refer to:

- a phrase from the Christian prayer Requiem Æternam
- Light Perpetual (Sapkowski novel), a 2006 historical fantasy novel by Andrzej Sapkowski
- Lux Perpetua (band), a Polish power metal band

== See also ==
- Eternal light (disambiguation)
- Perpetua (disambiguation)
- Lux Aeterna (disambiguation)
