= Intonation =

Intonation may refer to:

- Intonation (linguistics), variation of speaking pitch that is not used to distinguish words
- Intonation (music), a musician's realization of pitch accuracy, or the pitch accuracy of a musical instrument
- Intonation Music Festival, a summer music festival in Chicago

== See also ==
- Intonation unit, a segment of speech that occurs with a single prosodic contour
- Tone (disambiguation)
