= Head of femur =

Head of femur may refer to:

- Femoral head
- Head of Femur (band)
