= Pitchfork Music Festival 2006 =

Music festival

- Dates: July 29–30, 2006
- Locations: Union Park, Chicago, United States
- Website: pitchforkmusicfestival.com

The Pitchfork Music Festival 2006 was held over two days on July 29 to 30, 2006 at the Union Park, Chicago, United States. The edition marks the first edition under the current name, after the publication curated the lineup for Intonation Music Festival the previous year.

== Lineup ==
Artists listed from latest to earliest set times.

Aluminum Stage
Saturday, July 29	Sunday, July 30
Silver Jews; The Walkmen; Art Brut; The Mountain Goats; Man Man; Hot Machines	Os Mutantes; Yo La Tengo; Mission of Burma; Liars; Jens Lekman; Tapes 'n Tapes

Connector Stage
Saturday, July 29	Sunday, July 30
The Futureheads; Ted Leo and the Pharmacists; Destroyer; Band of Horses; Chin Up Chin Up	Spoon; Devendra Banhart; Aesop Rock & Mr. Lif; The National; Danielson

Biz 3 Stage
Saturday, July 29	Sunday, July 30
A-Trak; Matthew Dear; Matmos; Spank Rock; Ghislain Poirier; Tyondai Braxton; Chicago Underground Duo; Flosstradamus; 8 Bold Souls	Diplo; Dominik Eulberg; Glenn Kotche; Ada; Tarantula A.D. Cage; CSS; Bonde do Rolê; Jeff Parker & Nels Cline Quartet
