= Sacred fire =

Sacred fire or holy fire may refer to:

== Religion ==
- Any instance of fire worship, or the use of fires in religious ritual
- Yajna, Hindu rituals and sacrifices performed at a fire
  - Homa (ritual), general term for South Asian fire rituals
  - Vedi (altar), altar for fire rituals in Vedic religion
- The Sacred fire of Vesta in ancient Roman religion
- Holy Fire, a concept in Orthodox Christianity
- The sacred fire in Solomon's Temple
- The sacramental Easter Fire
- Fire personified as a deity in Indo-European religion:
  - Atar in Zoroastrianism
  - Agni in Hinduism
- Eternal flame modern flames kept permanently alight, on memorials etc.

== Entertainment ==
=== Books ===
- Sacred Fire (novel), a 2003 Dragonlance novel by Chris Pierson
- Holy Fire (novel), a 1996 novel by Bruce Sterling

=== Music ===
- Sacred Fire, a 2011 album by Jimmy Cliff
- Sacred Fire: Live in South America, a 1993 album by Santana
- Holy Fire (album), an album by Foals released in 2013
- The Holy Fire, an American indie rock band
  - The Holy Fire (EP), an EP by the eponymous band released in 2004

== Other uses ==
- Various diseases all also referred to as St. Anthony's fire
- Holy Fire (2018), a wildfire in California

== See also ==
- Eternal flame (disambiguation)
