= Amar Deep =

Amar Deep (transl. The Eternal Lamp) may refer to these in Indian cinema:

- Amardeep (1958 film), a Bollywood film
- Amar Deep (1979 film), a Bollywood film
- Amara Deepam (1956 film), a Tamil film
- Amara Deepam (1977 film), a Telugu film
- Amar Kaleka (born 1978), full name Amardeep Singh Kaleka, film director
- Amardeep Jha (born 1960), Indian actress

== See also ==
- Amardeep Singh (disambiguation)
- Eternal light (disambiguation)
