= Perpetua (disambiguation) =

Perpetua was a third-century Christian martyr.

Perpetua or Perpétua may also refer to:

== People ==
- Perpetua of Hippo (died c. 423), abbess and sister of Augustine of Hippo
- Maria Perpétua (1790–1817), a Brazilian alleged witch
- Perpétua Almeida (born 1964), Brazilian politician, banker and teacher
- Perpetua Nkwocha (born 1976), Nigerian footballer
- Perpetua Pope (1916–2013), Scottish landscape painter
- Perpetua Sappa Konman (born 1972), Micronesian physician and politician
- Perpetua Siyachitema (born 1983), Zimbabwean netball player

== Other uses ==
- Perpetua (typeface), serif typeface designed by Eric Gill
- Perpetua (film) or Love's Boomerang, a 1922 crime film
- Cape Perpetua, headland in Oregon, United States
- Perpetua oilfield, Angola
- Perpetua Press, a 1930s English printing press
- Perpetua (DC Comics), fictional character from DC Comics

== See also ==
- Lux perpetua (disambiguation)
- Perpetual (disambiguation)
- Esto perpetua, the state motto of Idaho
- Reclusión perpetua, a variant of life imprisonment
- St. Perpetua School, a school in California
