= Colonies in antiquity =

Colonies founded from a mother-city during the classical period

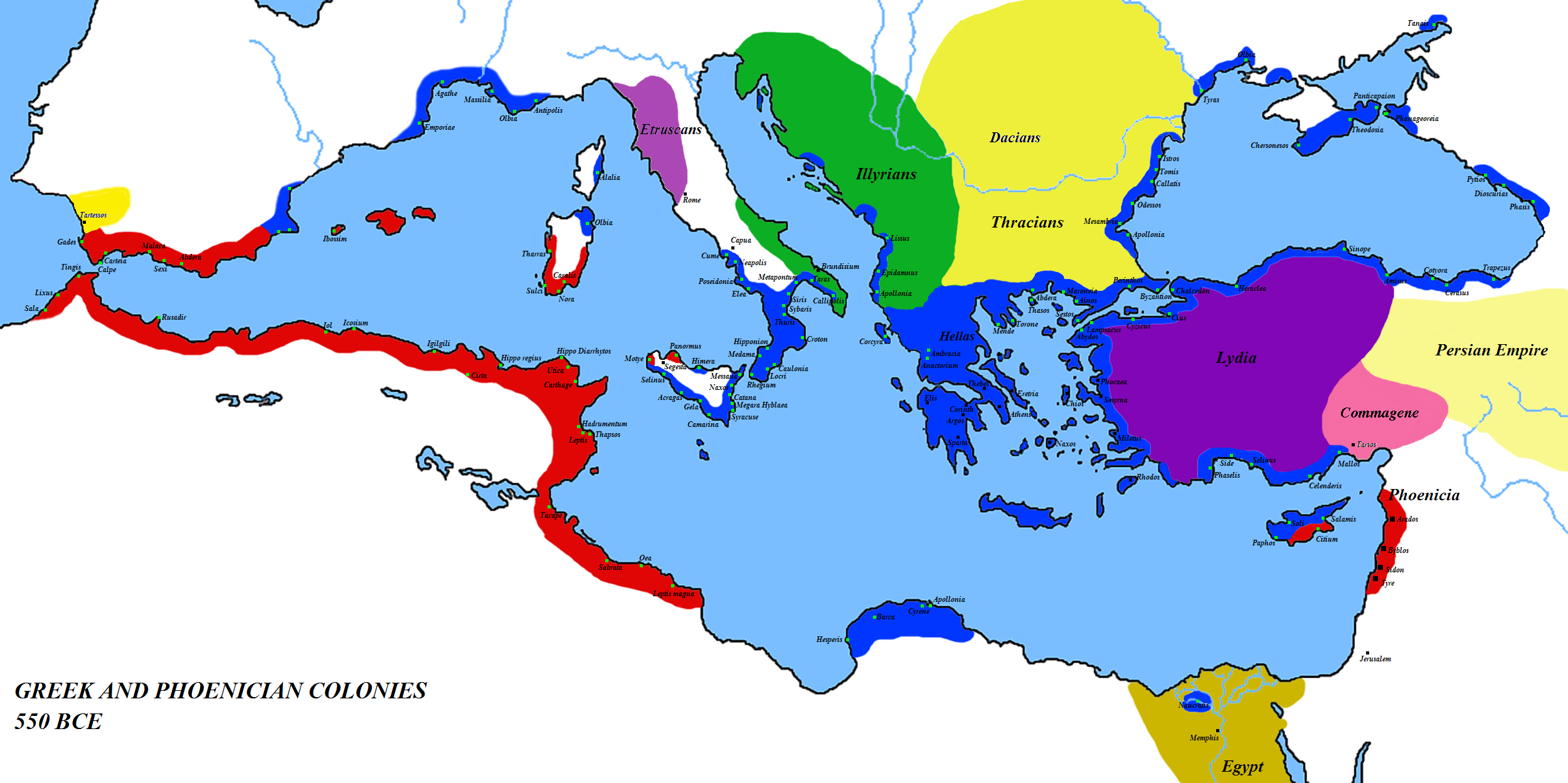
The Mediterranean c. 6th century BC: Phoenician settlements in red, Greek areas in blue, and other territories as marked

Colonies in antiquity were post-Iron Age city-states founded from a mother-city or metropolis rather than from a territory-at-large. Bonds between a colony and its metropolis often remained close, and took specific forms during the period of classical antiquity. Generally, colonies founded by the ancient Phoenicians, Carthage, Rome, Alexander the Great and his successors remained tied to their metropolis, though Greek colonies of the Archaic and Classical eras were sovereign and self-governing from their inception. While earlier Greek colonies were often founded to solve social unrest in the mother-city by expelling a part of the population, Hellenistic, Roman, Carthaginian, and Han Chinese colonies served as centres for trade (entrepôts), expansion and empire-building.

== Egyptian colonies ==
Egyptian settlement and colonisation is attested from about 3200 BC onward, all over the area of southern Canaan, by almost every type of artifact: architecture (fortifications, embankments and buildings), pottery, vessels, tools, weapons, seals, etc. Narmer had Egyptian pottery produced in Canaan and exported back to Egypt, from regions such as Arad, En Besor, Rafiah, and Tel Erani. An area of permanent settlement may have been administered from Tell es-Sakan, which is the largest Egyptian settlement in the region. An Early Bronze Age brewery belonging to an Egyptian settlement was found in Jaffa. Shipbuilding was known to the ancient Egyptians as early as 3000 BC, and perhaps earlier. The Archaeological Institute of America reports that the earliest dated ship — dating to 3000 BC – may have belonged to the Pharaoh Aha.

== Phoenician and Carthaginian colonies ==
The Phoenicians were the major trading power in the Mediterranean in the early part of the first millennium BC. They had trading contacts in Egypt and Greece, and established colonies as far west as modern Spain, at Gadir (modern Cádiz), and modern Morocco, at Tingis and Mogador. From Spain and Morocco, the Phoenicians controlled access to the Atlantic Ocean and the trade routes to Britain and Senegal.

The most famous and successful of Phoenician colonies was founded by settlers from Tyre in 814–813 BC and called Kart-Hadasht (Qart-ḥadašt, literally "New Town"), known in English as Carthage. The Carthaginians later founded their own colonies in the western Mediterranean, notably a colony in southeast Spain, Carthago Nova, which was eventually conquered by their enemy, Rome.

According to María Eugenia Aubet, Professor of Archaeology at the Pompeu Fabra University, Barcelona:

The earliest presence of Phoenician material in the West is documented within the precinct of the ancient city of Huelva, Spain... The high proportion of Phoenician pottery among the new material found in 1997 in the Plaza de las Monjas in Huelva argues in favour, not of a few first sporadic contacts in the zone, but of a regular presence of Phoenician people from the start of the ninth century BC. The recent radiocarbon dates from the earliest levels in Carthage situate the founding of this Tyrian colony in the years 835–800 cal BC, which coincides with the dates handed down by Flavius Josephus and Timeus for the founding of the city.

== Sabaeans and the Horn of Africa ==
The nature of the origins of Dʿmt (founded c. 800 BCE around Ethiopia's Tigray Region) regarding the role played by Sabaeans from Sheba in South Arabia continues to be debated by historians. Evidence of strong Sabaean influence includes Sabaic inscriptions and Sabaean temples. As of 2017, scholars of South Arabian archaeology and epigraphy tended to favour a migration and/or colonisation, while scholars of African archaeology tended to stress an indigenous origin. However writing in 2025 Alfredo González-Ruibal said that "idea of colonisation as such has been discarded".

In 2019, Sabaean inscriptions were found in Somaliland and Puntland, as well as a Sabaean temple whose inscriptions say its construction was ordered by the admiral of Sheba's fleet. González-Ruibal said "we can perhaps discern two different models: a proper colonialist one along the northern Somali seaboard, with direct intervention of the state and aimed at the extraction of resources, and a diasporic model in the northern Horn, led by élites who soon mixed with local people, while maintaining ties with their ancestral homeland".

== Ancient Greek colonies ==
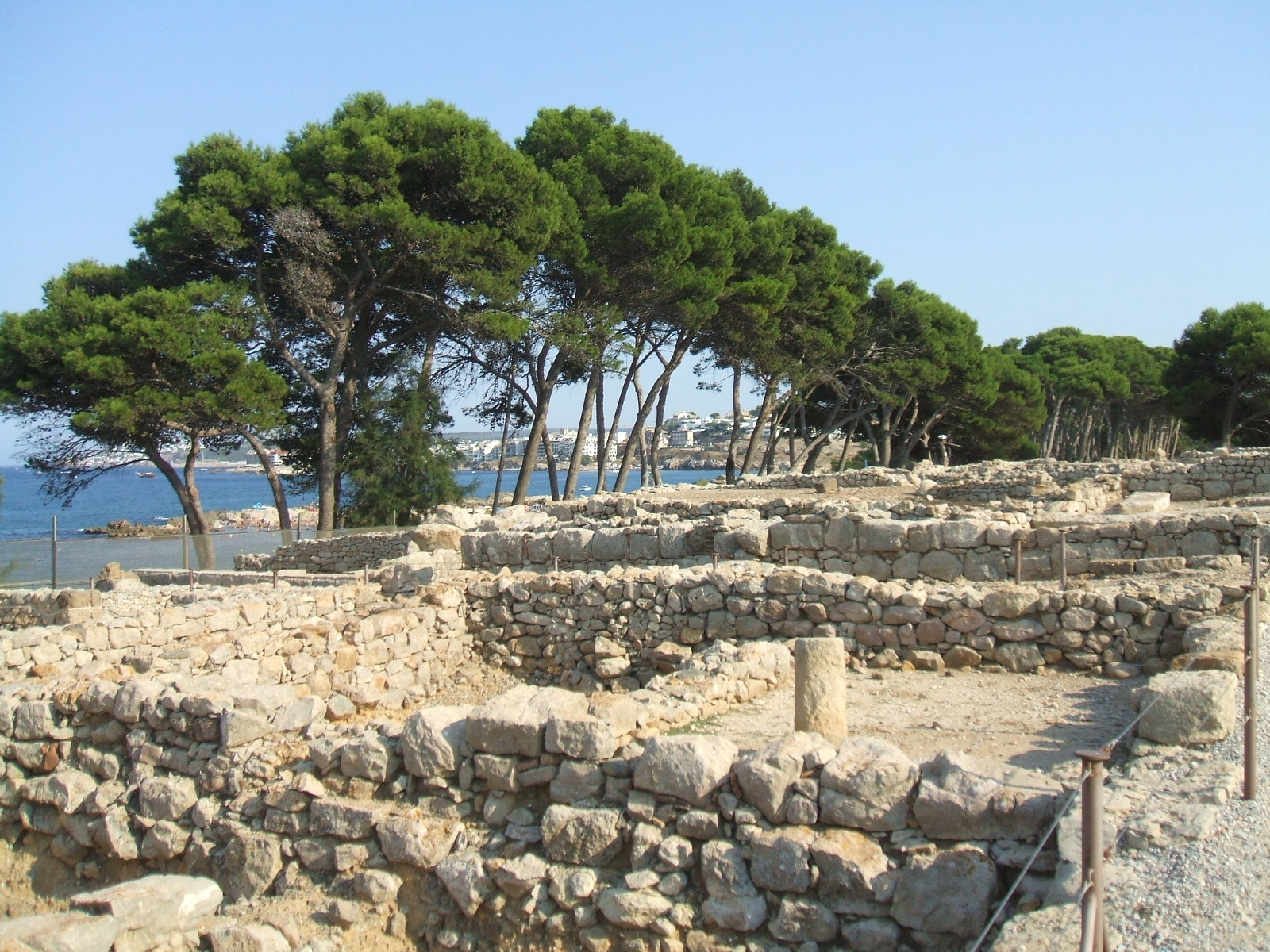
Ruins of a peristyle home from the Greek period of Empúries, Catalonia, Spain

In Ancient Greece, a defeated people would sometimes found a colony, leaving their homes to escape the subjugation of a foreign enemy. Sometimes colonies formed as a result of civil disorder, where the losers in internecine battles left to form a new city elsewhere; sometimes they would form to relieve population pressure and thereby to avoid internal unrest; and also, as a result of ostracism. In most cases, however, colony founders aimed to establish trade relations with foreign areas and to further the wealth of the metropolis. Colonies were established in Ionia and Thrace as early as the 8th century BC.

More than thirty Greek city-states had multiple colonies, dotted all across the Mediterranean world. From the late 9th to the 5th century BC, the most active colony-founding city, Miletus of the Ionian League, spawned more than 60 colonies encompassing the shores of the Black Sea in the east, the Iberian Peninsula in the west, Magna Graecia (present-day southern Italy) and several colonies on the Libyan coast of northern Africa.

Greeks founded two similar types of colony:

- the apoikía (ἀποικία from ἀπό apó “away from” + οἶκος oîkos "home", pl. ἀποικίαι apoikiai), an independent city-state
- the emporion (ἐμπόριov, pl. ἐμπόρια emporia), a trading colony

Greek city-states began to establish colonies between 900 and 800 BC; the first two were Al Mina on the Syrian coast and the Greek emporium Pithecusae at Ischia in the Bay of Naples, both established about 800 BC by Euboeans.

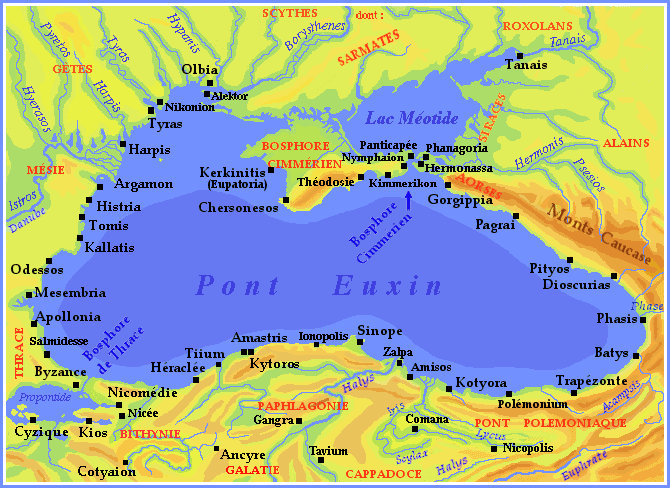
Ancient Greek colonies of the Black Sea, 8th-3rd century BC

In the "Great Greek Colonization", two new waves of colonists set out from Greece between the Dark Ages and the start of the Archaic Period – the first in the early 8th century BC and the second in the 6th century BC. Population growth and cramped conditions at home seem an insufficient explanation for these migrations, while the economic and political dynamics produced by the competition between the frequently leaderless Greek city-states – newly introduced as a concept and striving to expand their spheres of economic influence – better fits as their likely incentive. By means of this Greek expansion, the use of coins flourished throughout the Mediterranean Basin.

Influential Greek colonies in the western Mediterranean – many in present-day southern Italy — included Cyme; Rhegion frounded from Chalcis and Zancle (c. 8th century); Syracuse from Corinth and Tenea (c. 734 BC); Naxos from Chalcis (c. 734 BC); Massalia (Marseille, c. 598 BC) and Agathe, shortly after Massalia, from Phocaea; Hyele in Italy and Emporion in Spain from Phocaea and Massalia (c. 540 BC and early 6th century); Antipolis in France from Achaea; Alalia in Corsica from Phocaea and Massalia (c. 545 BC) and Cyrene (Cyrenaica, Libya) from Thera (762/61 and 632/31 BC).

The Greeks also colonised the Crimea in the Black Sea. The settlements they established there included the city of Chersonesos (modern Sevastopol). Another area with significant Greek colonies was the coast of ancient Illyria on the Adriatic Sea (e.g. Aspalathos, modern Split, Croatia).

Cicero remarks on the extensive Greek colonization, noting that "Indeed it seems as if the lands of the barbarians had been bordered round with a Greek sea-coast."

Several formulae generally shaped the solemn and sacred occasions when a new colony set forth. If a Greek city decided to send out a colony, the citizenry almost invariably consulted an oracle, such as the Oracle of Delphi, beforehand. Sometimes certain classes of citizens were called upon to take part in the enterprises; sometimes one son was chosen by lot from every house where there were several sons; and strangers expressing a desire to join were admitted. A person of distinction was selected to guide the emigrants and to make the necessary arrangements. It was usual to honor these founders as heroes after their death. Some of the sacred fire was taken from the public hearth in the Prytaneum, from which the fire on the public hearth of the new city was kindled. Just as each individual had his private shrines, so the new community maintained the worship of its chief domestic deities, the colony sending embassies and votive gifts to the mother-city's principal festivals for centuries afterwards.

After the conquests of Macedonia and Alexander the Great in the 4th century BC, a further large number of Hellenistic colonies were founded, ranging from Egypt to India.

=== Greek colonies in Anatolia ===
By the 15th century BC, the Mycenaeans had reached Rhodes, Crete, Cyprus (where the legendary Teucer allegedly founded the first colony) and the shores of Anatolia. In addition, Greeks settled in Ionia and Pontus. Miletus in Ionia was an ancient Greek city on the west coast of Anatolia, near the mouth of the Meander River. In the late Bronze Age (13th century BC), Miletus saw the arrival of the Carians, Luwian-speakers from south central Anatolia. Later in that century, other Greeks arrived. The city at that time rebelled against the Hittite Empire. After the fall of that empire, the city was destroyed in the 12th century BC and starting about 1000 BC was resettled extensively by Ionians.

Before the invasion from Persia in the middle of the 6th century BC, Miletus ranked as one of the greatest and wealthiest Greek poleis. Over several centuries, numerous ancient Greek city-states were established on the coasts of Anatolia. Greeks began developing Western philosophy on the western coast of Anatolia (Pre-Socratic philosophy). Thales, Anaximander, Anaximenes and Diogenes of Apollonia were among the renowned philosophers of the Milesian school. Heraclitus lived in Ephesus another ancient Greek city in Ionia, and Anaxagoras came from Clazomenae, a member of the Ionian League. All the Ancient Greek dialects were spoken in Anatolia in the various city-states and the list of ancient Greek theatres in Anatolia is one of the longest among all places where the Greeks settled.

Greeks traditionally lived in the region of Pontus, on the south shores of the Black Sea and in the Pontic Alps in northeastern Anatolia, in the area of the present-day province of Kars in the Caucasus, and also in Georgia. Those from southern Russia, Ukraine, and Crimea are often referred to as 'Northern Pontic Greeks', in contrast to those from 'South Pontus', which strictly speaking is Pontus proper. Those from Georgia, northeastern Anatolia, and the ones who lived in present-day Armenia are often referred to as 'Eastern Pontic Greeks' or Caucasus Greeks. Many Greek-founded colonies are well-known cities to this day. Sinope and Trabzon (Greek: Τραπεζοῦς Trapezous), were founded by Milesian traders (756 BC) as well as Samsun, Rize and Amasra. Greek was the lingua franca of Anatolia from the conquests of Alexander the Great up to the invasion of the Seljuk Turks in the eleventh century AD.

=== Jewish colonies ===
The historian Josephus states that Abraham "contrived to settle [his sons and grandsons] in colonies", referring to those of his family descended from Keturah.

During the Ptolemaic rule of Judea (from 301 BC to 198 BC), large-scale Jewish settlement in Egypt commenced. The Hellenistic Ptolemies brought in Jewish soldiers along with their families, while other Jews migrated from Judea to Egypt — likely for economic opportunities. Additionally, the Ptolemies established Jewish colonies in the cities of Cyrenaica (modern-day Libya).

=== Relations of colony and metropolis ===
The relation between colony and mother-city (metropolis) was viewed as one of mutual affection. Differences were resolved peacefully whenever possible, war being seen as a last resort. (Note though that the Peloponnesian War of 431–404 BC broke out partly due to a dispute between Corinth and her colony Corcyra.)

The charter of foundation contained general provisions for the arrangement of the affairs of the colony, and also some special enactments. A colony would usually adopt the constitution of the mother-city, but the new city remained politically independent. The "holy fire" of the metropolis was preserved in a special place to remind people of the common ties. If the colony sent out a fresh colony on its own account, the mother-city was generally consulted, or was at least asked to furnish a leader. Frequently the colonies, declaring their commitment to the various metropolitic alliances formed in the Greek mainland and for religious reasons, would pay tribute in religious centres such as Delphi, Olympia, or Delos.

The cleruchs (κληροῦχοι, klêrouchoi) formed a special class of Greek colonists, each being assigned an individual plot of land (κλῆρος, klêros). The trade-factories set up on foreign shores, such as Naucratis in Egypt, were somewhat different from ordinary colonies, with the members retaining the right of domicile in their own homeland and confining themselves to their own quarter in the foreign city.

== Roman colonies ==
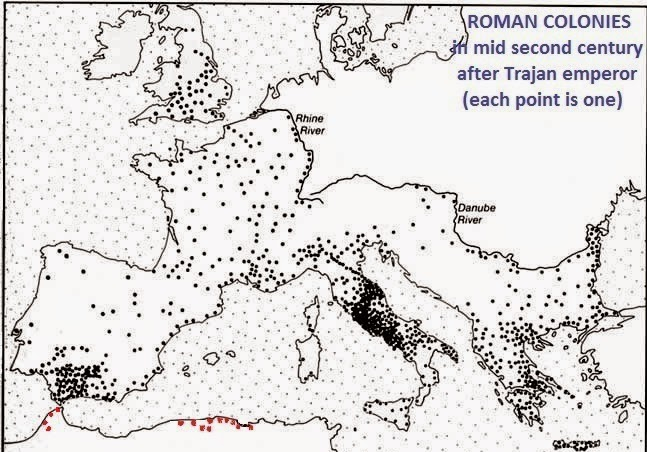
Roman colonies as of the mid-2nd century AD. Augustus' "Roman coloniae" in north Africa are depicted in red.

It was an old custom in ancient Italy to send out colonies for the purpose of securing new conquests. The Romans, having no standing army, used to plant bodies of their own citizens in conquered towns as a kind of garrison. These bodies would consist partly of Roman citizens, usually to the number of three hundred and partly of members of the Latin League in larger numbers. One third of the conquered territory was taken for the settlers. The coloniae civium Romanorum (colonies of Roman citizens) were specially intended to secure the two coasts of Italy, and were hence called coloniae maritimae. The far more numerous coloniae Latinae served the same purpose for the mainland, but they were also inhabited by Latins and much more populated.

The duty of leading the colonists and founding the settlement was entrusted to a commission usually consisting of three members. These men continued to stand in the relation of patrons (patroni) to the colony after its foundation. The colonists entered the conquered city in military array, preceded by banners, and the foundation was celebrated with special solemnities. The coloniae were free from taxes, and had their own constitution, a copy of the Roman, electing from their own body their Senate and other officers of State. To this constitution the original inhabitants had to submit. The coloniae civium Romanorum retained Roman citizenship, and were free from military service, their position as outposts being regarded as an equivalent. The members of the coloniae Latinae served among the socii, the allies, and possessed the so-called ius Latinum or Latinitas. This secured to them the right of acquiring property, the concept of commercium, and the right of settlement in Rome, and under certain conditions the power of becoming Roman citizens; though in course of time these rights underwent many limitations.

From the time of the Gracchi the colonies lost their military character. Colonization came to be regarded as a means of providing for the poorest class of the Roman Plebs. After the time of Sulla it was adopted as a way of granting land to veteran soldiers. The right of founding colonies passed into the hands of the Roman emperors during the Principate, who used it mainly in the provinces for the exclusive purpose of establishing military settlements, partly with the old idea of securing conquered territory. It was only in exceptional cases that the provincial colonies enjoyed the immunity from taxation which was granted to those in Italy.

== Chinese colonies ==
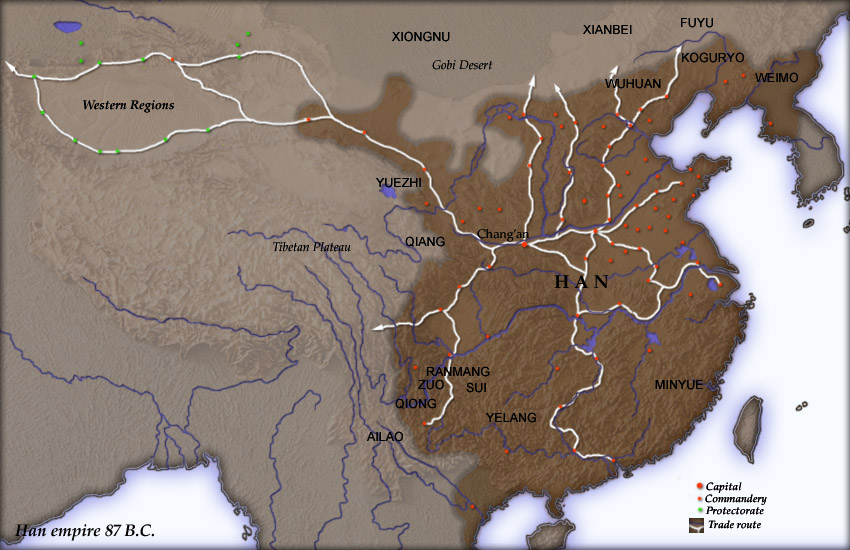
Han dynasty in 87 BC, showing the Protectorate of the Western Regions to the west in the Tarim Basin

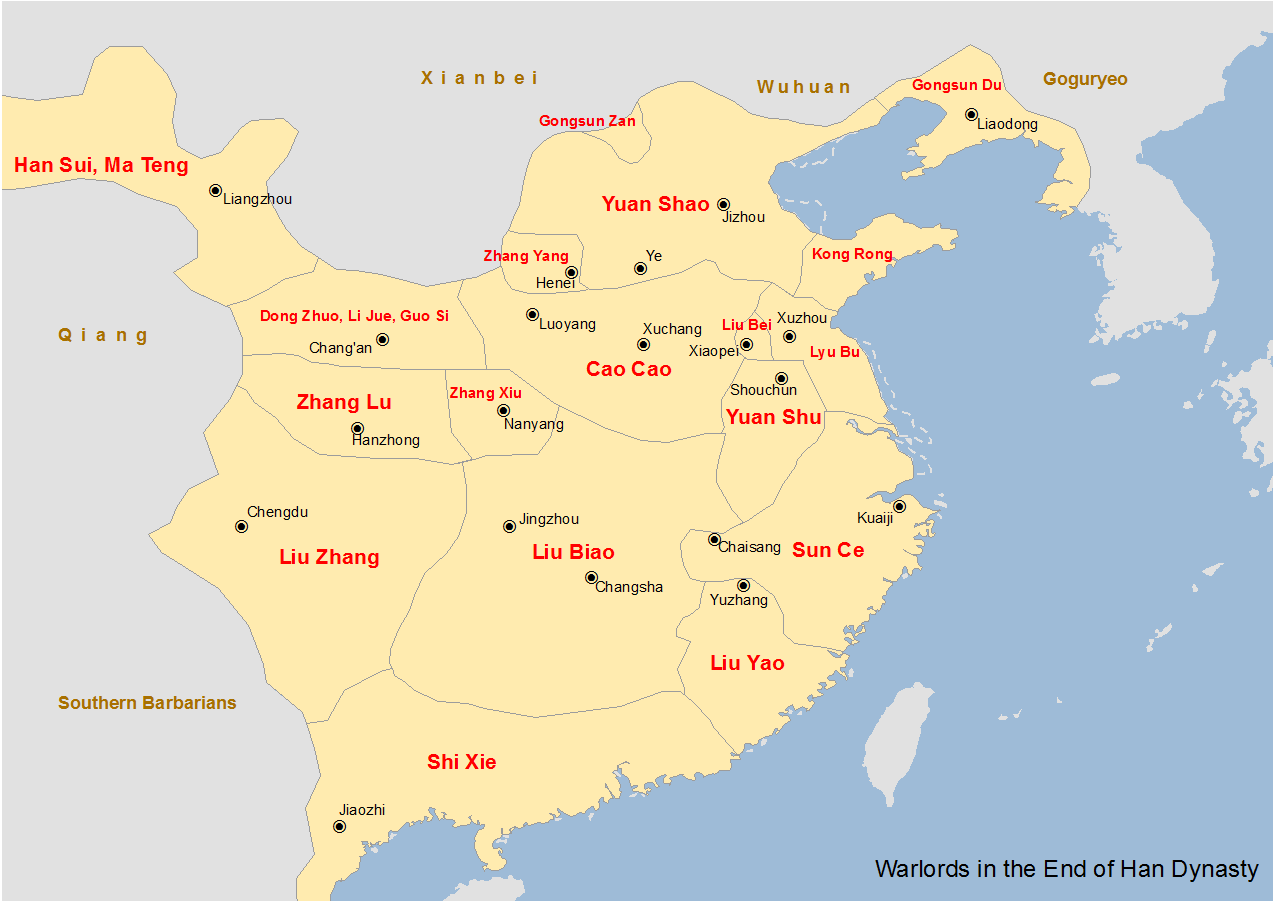
China at the end of the Han dynasty from 189-220 AD

Imperial China during the Han dynasty (202 BC–220 AD) extended its rule over what is now much of China proper as well as Inner Mongolia, northern Vietnam, northern Korea, the Hexi Corridor of Gansu, and the Tarim Basin region of Xinjiang on the easternmost fringes of Central Asia. After the nomadic Mongolic Xiongnu ruler Hunye (渾邪) was defeated by Huo Qubing in 121 BC, settlers from various regions of China under the rule of Emperor Wu of Han colonized the Hexi Corridor and Ordos Plateau. Tuntian, self-sustaining agricultural military garrisons, were established in frontier outposts to secure the massive territorial gains and Silk Road trade routes leading into Central Asia. Emperor Wu oversaw the Han conquest of Nanyue in 111 BC, bringing areas of Guangdong, Guangxi, Hainan Island, and northern Vietnam under Han rule, and by 108 BC completed the Han conquest of Gojoseon in what is now North Korea. Han Chinese colonists in the Xuantu and Lelang commanderies of northern Korea dealt with occasional raids by the Goguryeo and Buyeo kingdoms, but conducted largely peaceful trade relations with surrounding Korean peoples who in turn became heavily influenced by Chinese culture.

In 37 AD the Eastern Han general Ma Yuan sent Han Chinese to the northeastern frontier and settled defeated Qiang tribes within Han China's Tianshui Commandery and Longxi Commandery. Ma pursued a similar policy in the south when he defeated the Trưng Sisters of Jiaozhi, in what is now modern northern Vietnam, resettling hundreds of Vietnamese into China's Jing Province in 43 AD, seizing their sacred bronze drums as rival symbols of royal power, and reinstating Han authority and laws over Jiaozhi. Historian Rafe de Crespigny remarks that this was a "brief but effective campaign of colonisation and control", before the general returned north in 44 AD.

Cao Song, an Eastern Han administrator of Dunhuang, had military colonies established in what is now Yiwu County near Hami in 119 AD. However, Empress Deng Sui, regent for the young Emperor Shang of Han, pursued a slow, cautious policy of settlement on the advice of Ban Yong, son of Ban Chao, as the Eastern Han Empire came into conflict with the Jushi Kingdom, the Shanshan and their Xiongnu allies located around the Taklamakan Desert in the Western Regions. In 127 AD Ban Yong was able to defeat the Karasahr in battle and colonies were established all the way to Turfan, but by the 150s AD the Han presence in the Western Regions began to wane. Towards the end of the Han dynasty, chancellor Cao Cao established agricultural military colonies for settling wartime refugees. Cao Cao also established military colonies in Anhui province in 209 AD as a means to clearly demarcate a border between his realm and that of his political rival Sun Quan.

== See also ==
- Classical demography
- List of cities founded by the Romans
- List of ancient cities in Thrace and Dacia
- List of settlements in Illyria
- List of Roman colonies
- Alexandria (disambiguation)
- Roman Empire
