= In the Name of the World =

EP by The Holy Fire
- Released: February 21, 2006
- Recorded: 2005
- Genre: Indie Rock
- Length: 21:08
- Label: The Militia Group
- Producer: Michael Ivins

The Holy Fire chronology
| The Holy Fire (EP) (2004) | In the Name of the World (2006) |

Professional ratings
Review scores
| Source | Rating |
|---|---|
| Allmusic | 3.5/5 stars |

In the Name of the World is the second EP by American rock band The Holy Fire and was produced by The Flaming Lips bassist Michael Ivins.

== Track listing ==
1. "Raised on Planes"
2. "Dreams to Spend"
3. "Bombs in the Distance"
4. "We're Not Here to Learn"
5. "In the Name of the World"
6. "Hate Your Smile"

== Personnel ==
- Sean Hoen - guitar, vocals
- Nathan Miller - bass
- Nick Marko - drums
- Ryan Wilson - guitar
- Michael Ivins - producer
- Michael Fossenkemper - engineer
- Mark Penxa - artwork
