= The Holy Fire =

American indie rock band

- Origin: Detroit, Michigan
- Genres: Indie rock
- Years active: 2004–2006
- Labels: Conquer The World Records, Down Peninsula Audio, The Militia Group
- Members: Sean Hoen; Nathan Miller; Nick Marko; Ryan Wilson; Eric Maluchnik; Dan Skyver

The Holy Fire was an post-rock band from Metro Detroit, Michigan. In 2006, they signed with the California-based label, The Militia Group, which released their six-song EP In the Name of the World that year.

== History ==
The Holy Fire was formed in 2004 after a studio session that produced the group's debut self-titled EP. Reviewing the band's debut EP, Real Detroit Weekly wrote, "This EP redefines what a Detroit rock band should sound like," while Punk Planet gave the EP high praise. Alternative Press also praised the EP, comparing it to Hüsker Dü and Jawbox.

In 2006, The Holy Fire signed to the Sony/BMG-distributed southern California label The Militia Group. Their second EP In the Name of the World was released on February 21, 2006, and produced by The Flaming Lips bassist Michael Ivins. The band broke up after playing South By Southwest during their 2006 tour to support the EP. Two months prior to their breakup, the band had been featured on the cover of Detroit's Metro Times.

All Music Guide's James Christopher Monger gave the In The Name of the World EP the following review: "Melodic post-rockers the Holy Fire followed up their independent 2004 debut EP with another EP, this time for the Southern California indie imprint The Militia Group. Produced by Flaming Lip Michael Ivins, In the Name of the World is tightly wound, emotive, and succinct in its commercial aspirations without sacrificing any of the Detroit collective's signature volatility. Ivins, a bass player by trade, has fortified the songs' foundations in a way that allows each track to succeed on both a musical and muscular level, allowing standout cuts like "Bombs in the Distance" and "Raised on Planes" the room to pound away at the skull before engaging the brain. Vocalist/guitarist Sean Hoen channels everyone from Jeremy Enigk to Robin Zander, giving a lyric like "Kiss me right here with your mouth/All sick from smoke and beer" a necessary dose of desperation and transcendence, the latter of which the Holy Fire seemed destined to achieve."

The band performed concerts with a number of indie acts, including: TV on the Radio, The Constantines, and Metric.

The Holy Fire included members of Leaving Rouge and the late hardcore band Thoughts of Ionesco. Members went on to play in Your Skull My Closet. Singer/guitarist Sean Hoen recorded a solo album called The Liquor Witch. It was released by Portland's Greyday Productions in 2007.

Official Releases:

- Self-titled EP (Down Peninsula Audio, 2005)
- In the Name of the World (The Militia group, 2006)

== Members ==
The band consists of the following members:

- Sean Hoen
- Nathan Miller
- Nick Marko
- Ryan Wilson
- Eric Maluchnik
- Dan Skyver

== Discography ==
=== Albums ===
- The Holy Fire (Conquer The World Records/Down Peninsula Audio, 2004; re-released, May 10, 2005)
- In the Name of the World (The Militia Group, February 21, 2006)
