= The Holy Fire (EP) =

EP by The Holy Fire
- Released: 2004, re-released May 10, 2005
- Recorded: 2004
- Genre: Indie Rock
- Length: 19:05
- Label: Down Peninsula Audio, Conquer the World
- Producer: The Holy Fire

The Holy Fire chronology
The Holy Fire (2004)	In the Name of the World (2006)

Professional ratings
Review scores
Source	Rating
Alternative Press	4/5 stars
Allmusic	3.5/5 stars

The Holy Fire is the self-titled debut EP by American rock band The Holy Fire and was originally released in 2004.

== Track listing ==
1. "Lift Off Message"
2. "In Signs"
3. "Sleeping, Screaming Boy"
4. "I Heard Your Song"
5. "Outside the Mercury"
6. "Lehman's Lament"

== Personnel ==
- Sean Hoen - guitar, vocals
- Nathan Miller - bass
- Nick Marko - drums
- Dan Skiver - guitar
- Mark Penxa - artwork
- Jon Drew - engineer
