= Perpetual =

Perpetual, meaning "eternal", may refer to:

== Christianity ==
- Perpetual curacy, a type of Christian priesthood in Anglicanism
- Perpetual virginity of Mary, one of the four Marian dogmas in Catholicism

== Finance ==
- Perpetual bond, a bond with no maturity date
- Perpetual futures, (aka perpetual swaps) contract agreements to buy or sell an asset at an unspecified point in the future
- Perpetual plc, a British investment management company merged into Invesco in 2000
- Perpetual (company), an Australian diversified financials company
- Perpetuity, an annuity with payments that continue indefinitely

== Other ==
- Perpetual access or perpetual license, a license that allows continued access to electronic material (e.g. software)
- Perpetual Entertainment, an American software development company
- Perpetual Maritime Truce, the treaty defining peaceful relations in the Trucial States, today the United Arab Emirates
- Perpetual motion (disambiguation)
- Perpetual Union, a concept in American constitutional law and a feature of the Articles of Confederation, which established the United States as a national entity

== See also ==
- Perpetua (disambiguation)
