= Forugh-e Javidan =

Forugh-e Javidan ("eternal light" in Persian) may refer to:

- Film, called Flames of Persia in international release, about the 1971 celebration of the Persian Empire's 2,500th anniversary
- Operation Forough Javidan, 1988 attack against Ayatollah Khomeini's Islamic Republic of Iran by the People's Mujahedin of Iran

== See also ==
- Eternal light (disambiguation)
- Operation Forty Stars
