= Eternal light =

Eternal Light or eternal light may refer to:

- Sanctuary lamp, shines before the altar of religious sanctuaries
- The Eternal Light, 1944–89 NBC radio program on Jewish themes
- Eternal light mushroom (Mycena luxaeterna) bioluminescent fungus
- Eternal Light Flagstaff, 1923 monumental flagstaff in Madison Square, Manhattan, New York
- Eternal Light Peace Memorial, 1938 Gettysburg Battlefield monument
- Palace Theater Light, an incandescent light bulb in Fort Worth, Texas, continuously operating since 1908

== See also ==
- Lux Aeterna (disambiguation) (from the Latin for "eternal light")
- Forugh-e Javidan (disambiguation) (from the Persian for "eternal light")
- Amar Deep (disambiguation) (from the Sanskrit for "eternal light/lamp")
- Peak of eternal light, point on a body within the Solar System which is always in sunlight
- Eternal flame (disambiguation)
- There Is a Light That Never Goes Out, song by The Smiths
