= Park of Friendship, New Belgrade =

Park in Belgrade, Serbia

Park of Friendship
- Парк пријатељства
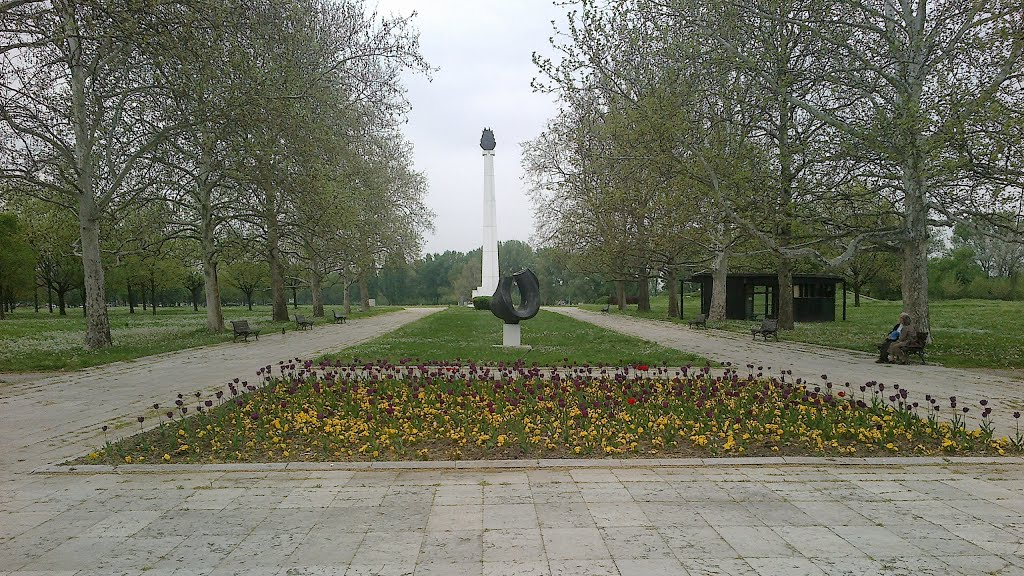

- Location within Belgrade
- Location: New Belgrade, Belgrade
- Coordinates: 44.820°N 20.437°E
- Created: 1961
- Open: Open all year

The Park of Friendship in New Belgrade is one of the largest parks in Belgrade.

== Location ==
The park is located in New Belgrade in the local community Ušće and it extends to a large green area from Hotel Yugoslavia along the Danube and the Sava River to Branko's Bridge. It is bordered by Mihailo Pupin Boulevard, Ušće, and Nikola Tesla Boulevard. Ušće and Nikola Tesla Boulevard. It also borders Veliko ratno ostrvo and Malo ratno ostrvo, and the city center of Belgrade through the Danube and the Sava River. Friendship Park covers an area of 14 hectares. It can be reached by local Bus via Bus Lines 15 and 84.

== Nature and sports facilities ==
The park includes a large number of green areas and trees and it leads to the Sava River and the Danube River. It is suitable for walking, physical activity or relaxation in nature. The park also has a bike path and a running trail. Although located near the center of Belgrade, peace and quiet prevail in the park. Within the park, there is also Skate Park Ušće.

== Construction and history ==
The idea for the establishment of the Friendship Park of memorial character came from Young Gorani, an environmental organization, which, in the name of holding the 1st Summit of the Non-Aligned Movement in Belgrade in 1961, decided to establish a memorial park as a symbol of the struggle for peace and equality for all peoples in the world. On 29 August 1961, their initiative was supported by the Council for Culture and the Council for Urban Planning of the National Committee of the City of Belgrade. Tito's planting of plane trees on 7 September 1961 was considered the grand opening of the Park. The preliminary design was done by engineer Vladeta Đorđević, but the final solution regarding the appearance and organization of the park space is shown in the project called "Potez," which won first prize at the Yugoslav competition in 1965. The Belgrade City Assembly and the committee on taking care of the construction and development of the park announced an all-Yugoslav competition. The specificity of the subject matter was a challenge to the authors since it treated the field of horticulture and the position of the park among the most important government buildings, the Palace of the Federal Executive Council and the former building of the CK CPY (today BC Ušće), Museum of Contemporary Art and Hotel Jugoslavija. Nineteen works were submitted in the competition, of which three were awarded and eleven were purchased. The first prize was won by the work under the code "Potez" by the architect Milan Pališaški. The second prize was shared by the architects Ranko Radović and Ljiljana Pekić. The third prize went to the architect Mira Holambek-Bencler from Zagreb. The construction of the park symbolically marked the establishment of the Non-Aligned Movement, one of whose founders was Yugoslavia. The work of the architect Pališaški, according to the selection panel, was a strict geometric solution with geometrical divisions and monumental size, ceremonial and representative.

== Peace Avenue ==
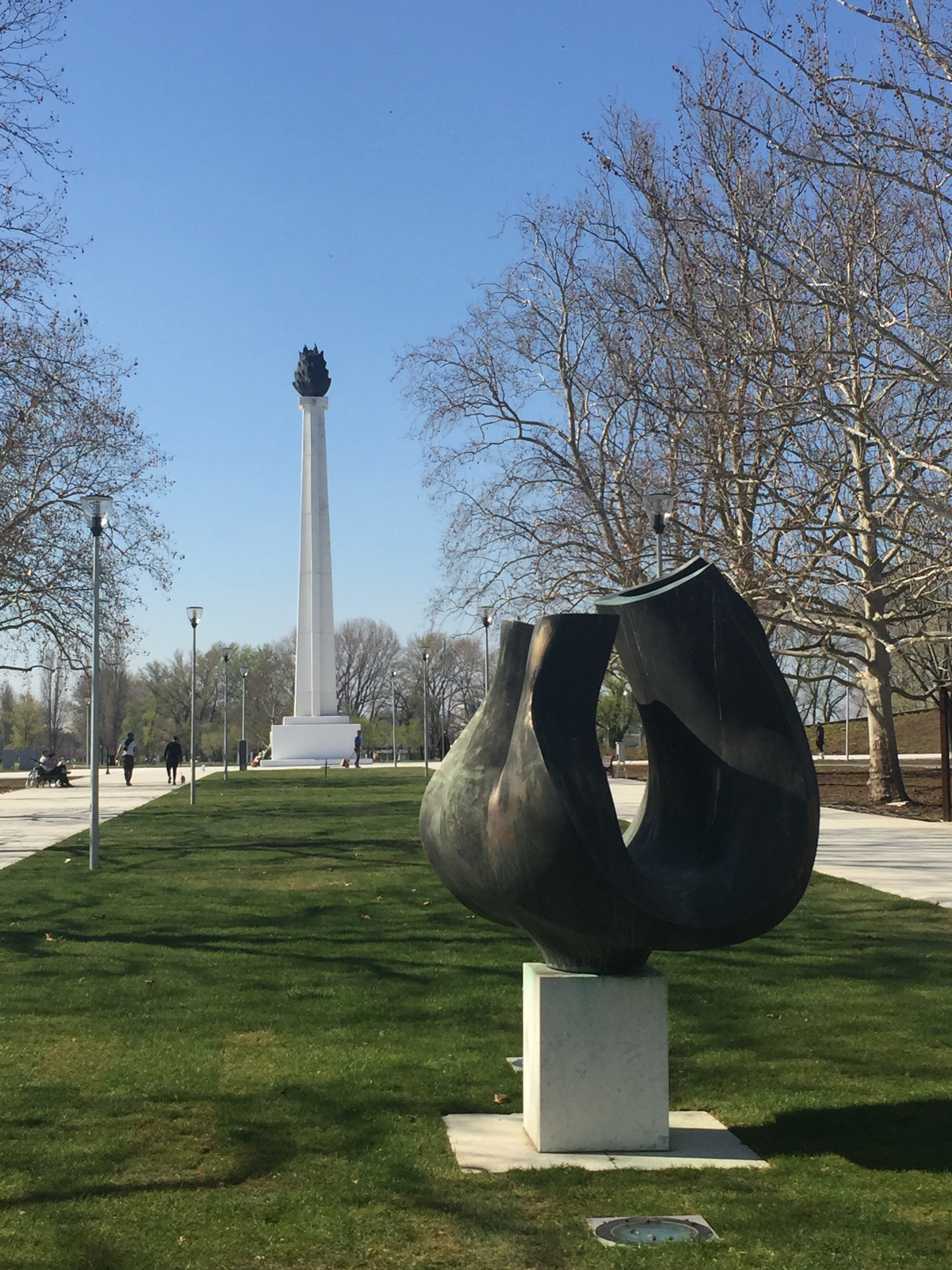
The sculpture Open Form (Flower) by Lidija Mišić, added in 1974. The Eternal Flame monument can be seen in the background

The Avenue of Peace with the memorial obelisk "Eternal Flame" is located in the central part of the park. The park features a flower statue of the sculptor Lidija Mišić. Peace Avenue with 25 plane trees that were planted by statesmen during a conference of the NAM in Belgrade until the 1989 summit, is 180 m long, which also represents the number of countries that committed themselves to peace as a political priority through the so-called policy of peaceful, active coexistence. All participants of the First Conference planted the same plant – plane tree. The selection of plane trees is based on their longevity, which emphasizes the idea of establishing a lasting peace in the world. Next to each planted tree is a tablet with the name of the statesman and the country of origin, year of planting, and the denomination of the tree Platanus acerifolia. Plane tree seedlings are placed at a distance of eight meters so that they can merge when they reach a certain height and thus form a unique green series which also symbolizes the connection of all nations through a common idea. From the competition solution to today, only 9.5 hectares of park area have been realized. Although little has been done out of the original idea of the architect Pališaški, the park’s unique design is still appreciated today.

== Monument "Eternal Flame" ==
The Eternal Flame memorial is located in the park and is dedicated to the military and civilian victims of the NATO bombing of Yugoslavia. The memorial was largely conceived by Mirjana Marković, the leader of the Yugoslav Left, and wife of Yugoslav president Slobodan Milošević. It was originally planned to have a height of 78 meters to symbolize the 78 days of the bombing.

The monument was unveiled on 12 June 2000, to commemorate the first anniversary of the end of the bombing. It was vandalized following the overthrow of Slobodan Milošević and was in a state of ruin for several years. It was partially renovated in 2019, but the flame remained extinguished.

== Famous people in the park ==
In this park, numerous officials and celebrities planted a tree as a sign of friendship. Among them were the following: Francois Mitterrand, Jоsip Broz Tito, Jawaharlal Nehru, Gamal Abdel Nasser, Queen Elizabeth II, Fidel Castro, Muammar Gaddafi, Emperor Haile Selassie, Leonid Brezhnev, Mikhail Gorbachev, Richard Nixon, Jimmy Carter, Todor Živkov, Nicolae Ceausescu, Kim Il Sung, Indira Gandhi and others. The last official who planted a tree during the existence of the Socialist Federative Republic of Yugoslavia was the Romanian President Ion Iliesku, who planted the 194th tree in the park in 1991. Even after the breakup of Yugoslavia, the tradition of planting trees in the park was maintained, so the members of the Rolling Stones planted trees in 2007, before their concert in Belgrade.

== Gallery ==
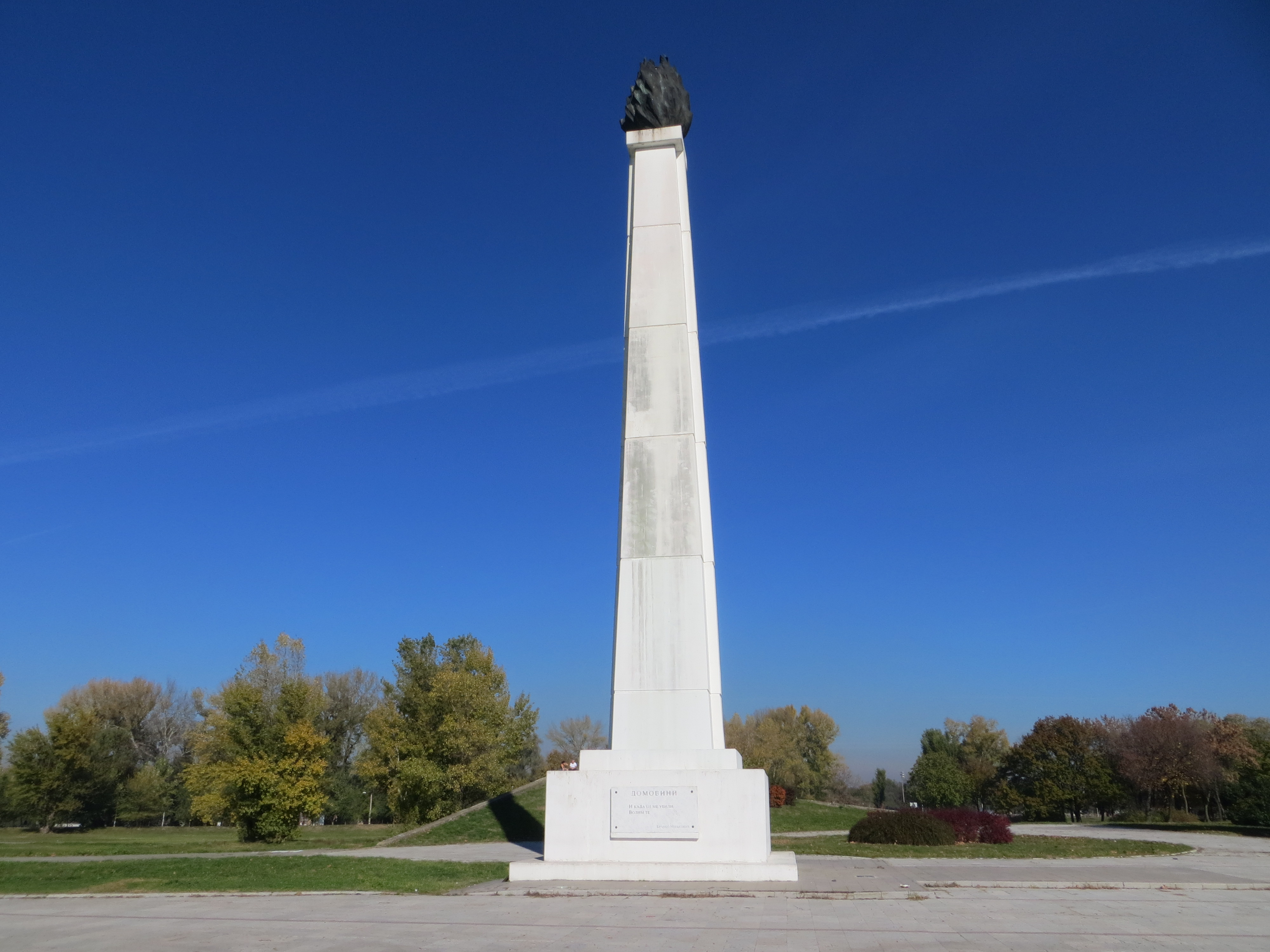
Monument "Eternal Flame"

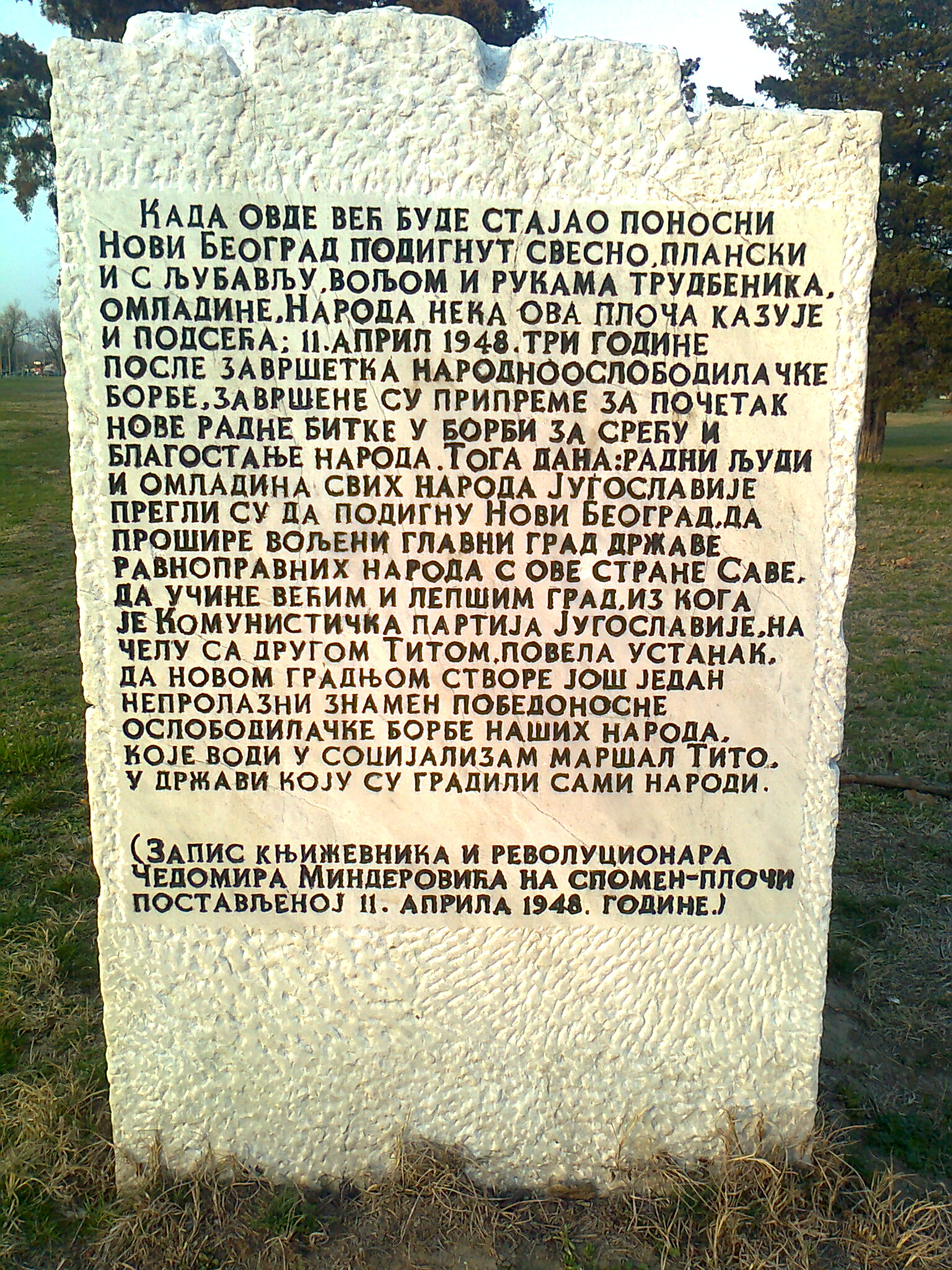
Memorial of the beginning of construction of New Belgrade

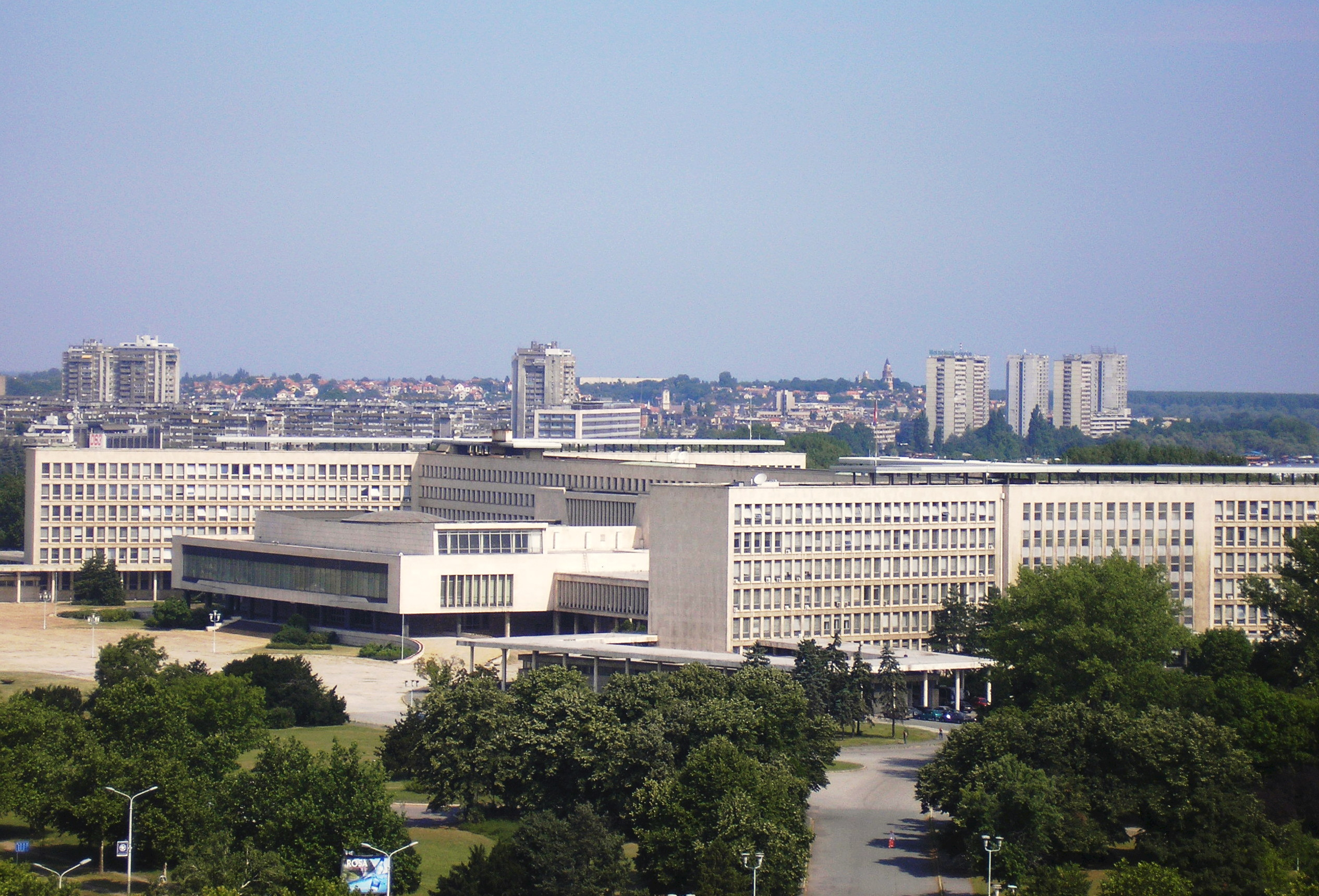
Palace of Serbia

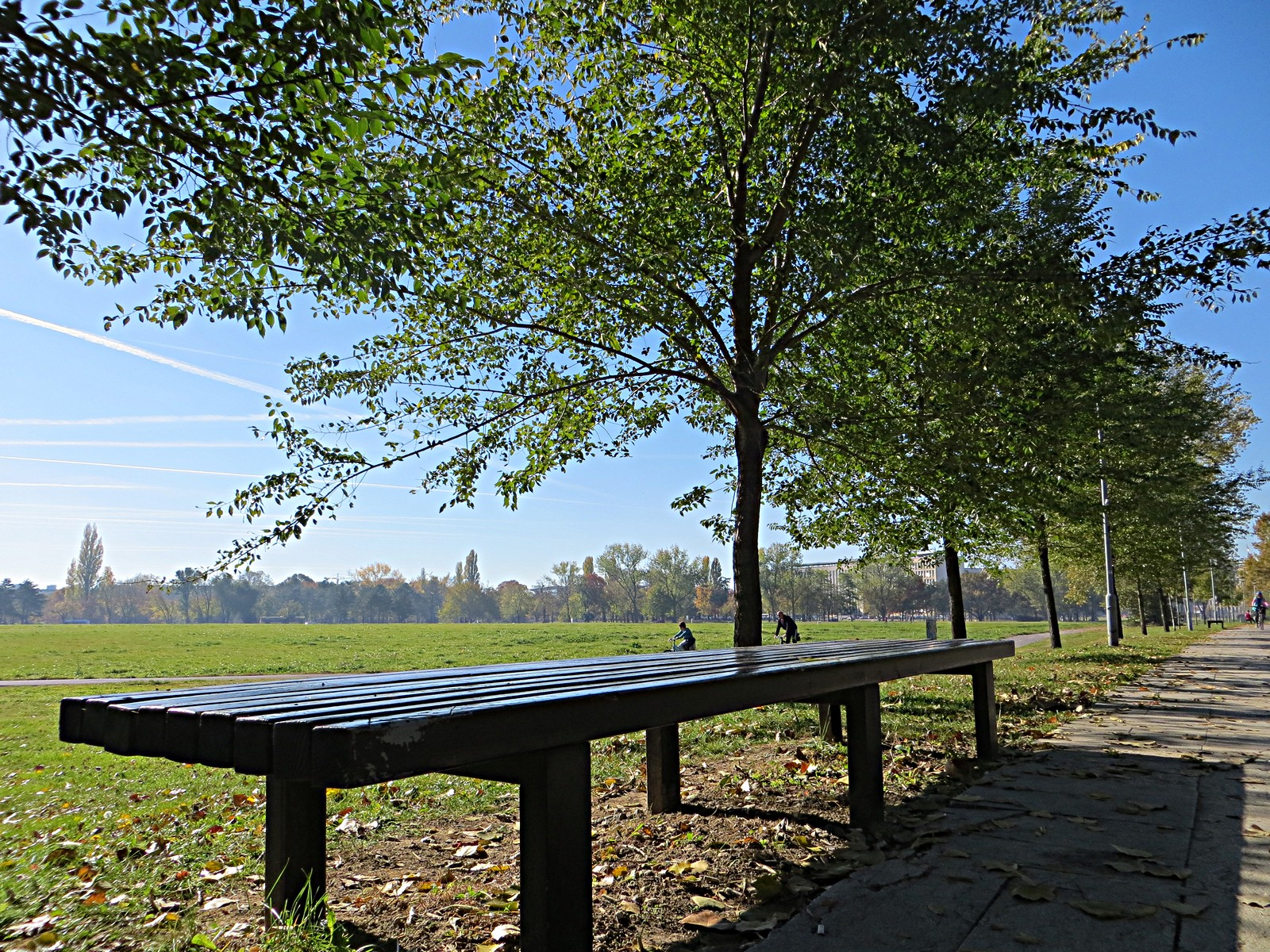
Friendship Park

== See also ==
- Palace of Serbia
- Non-Aligned Movement
- Yugoslavia and the Non-Aligned Movement
