= Leaving Rouge =

- Origin: Detroit, Michigan
- Genre: Indie rock
- Years active: 2001–2006
- Labels: Down Peninsula Audio, Greyday Productions

Leaving Rouge was an indie rock band from Detroit, Michigan.

== History ==
Leaving Rouge released Collected Songs shortly after the band's formation in 2002. The ten song album featured close to twenty musicians, the only constant being vocalist Sean Hoen. Prior to forming Leaving Rouge, Hoen had fronted Thoughts of Ionesco, a Detroit-based noise-core band whom Alternative Press had referred to as "an ultimate expression of pain-through-sound." According to a 2004 article in Real Detroit Weekly, Hoen claimed his change in musical direction drew skepticism from fans of Thoughts of Ionesco, and that the band had a difficult time finding an audience. He cited the Red House Painters and Nick Drake as being primary influences for the band's sound.

A self-titled EP on the Detroit label Down Peninsula Audio followed in 2003, and the band signed with Portland, OR indie label Greyday Productions in 2004. The band released a second EP titled White Houses. The EP was praised by sources as diverse as Harp Magazine and Playgirl Magazine. A second full-length album, Elsewhere, was released on March 21, 2006. A departure from the more experimental tones of White Houses, Elsewhere received mixed reviews and the band broke up before the end of the year. About the album, All Music Guide's Nick Raggett wrote, "As compared with the more stretched-out and reflective sound of the earlier version of the group, everything here is much more direct, aiming for play on a radio station that might not exist but probably should." He went on the say that, "The majestic "Sleep Now Forever," with some absolutely gorgeous guitar figures in particular, is the pick of the album. If there's something odd about Elsewhere it might be its mix—often it almost sounds like a muddy cassette-copy of a clearer master, or as if it should be in the background of a movie scene. It's not constant, though, and with time it sounds more like the artistic choice it was clearly meant to be."

Hoen and Leaving Rouge member Nick Marko played concurrently in The Holy Fire from 2003-2006. The band was signed to California indie label The Militia Group. During this time Leaving Rouge was largely a side project.

During its career, Leaving Rouge opened for Ted Leo, The Appleseed Cast, The Constantines, Kings of Convenience, Karate, and several other "indie" acts. Leaving Rouge, however, would never perform outside of Michigan.

In 2007, Hoen would release a full-length album The Liquor Witch under the name Sean Madigan Hoen.

Songs Only You Know, a memoir by Hoen which includes his experiences in the Detroit punk scene, was published in 2014.

== Members ==
Leaving Rouge members:

- Sean Hoen
- Kari Buzewski
- Josh Machniak
- Jason Vogel
- Nick Marko
- Sean Bondareff
- Brian Repa
- Nathan Miller
- Elizabeth Holbrook
- Blair Maman
- Mark Victor

== Discography ==
=== Albums ===
- Collected Songs (Down Peninsula Audio, 2003)
- Elsewhere (Greyday Productions, March 21, 2006)

=== EPs/Singles ===
- Demonstrations (Cascade Records, 2001)
- White Houses (Greyday Productions, 2004)
- White Cold Sun Digital EP (Greyday Productions, 2006)
