= Ringodom or Proctor =

Studio album by Head of Femur
- Released: August 19, 2003
- Genre: Indie rock
- Label: Greyday Productions
- Producer: Head of Femur; A.J. Mogis

Head of Femur chronology
Ringodom or Proctor (2003)	Hysterical Stars (2005)

Ringodom or Proctor is the first release by Chicago's Head of Femur. It was released on August 19, 2003 on Greyday Productions.

== Track listing ==
1. "January on Strike" – 4:30
2. "Curve that Byrd" – 3:21
3. "Yeoman or Tinker" – 6:02
4. "80 Steps to Jonah" – 3:10
5. "Me, My Dad, My Cousin, and... Ronnie" – 3:09
6. "Acme: The Summit of a Mountain" – 4:16
7. "The True Wheel" – 3:57
8. "Money is the Root..." – 3:35
9. "Science Needed a Medical Man" – 3:28
10. "Finally I've Made It Nowhere" – 4:25
11. "The Car Wore a Halo Hat"

The CD includes an untitled hidden track in the pregap.
