= Lux Aeterna =

Lux Aeterna may refer to:

- Lux Aeterna (Communion), the Communion antiphon for the Roman Catholic Requiem Mass

As such, it has often been set to music. The following works are settings of it, or have been inspired by it:

- Lux Aeterna (Terje Rypdal album) (2002)
- Lux Aeterna (Ligeti), a 1966 choral work by György Ligeti used in the film 2001: A Space Odyssey
- "Lux Aeterna" (Mansell), the theme song to Requiem for a Dream, written by Clint Mansell and performed by the Kronos Quartet
- "Lux Aeterna", a section of the liturgy from Requiem by Giuseppe Verdi
- Lux Aeterna, a 1972 album by William Sheller
- Lux aeterna, a 2011 work for mixed SATB choir by Robert Paterson
- Lux Aeterna, a 1997 five-movement quasi-Requiem by Morten Lauridsen
- "Lux Aeterna", a 2009 track by Christopher Tin from Calling All Dawns
- "Lux Aeterna", a 2014 song by Two Steps from Hell from Miracles
- "Lux Æterna" (Metallica song), a 2022 song by Metallica
- Lux Aeterna for 5 masked musicians, a 1971 avant-garde piece by George Crumb
- Symphony N 5 Lux Aeterna, a 2006 avant-garde piece by Vassil Kazandjiev
- Lux Aeterna for organ, a 1974 work by Joonas Kokkonen
- Lux aeterna, a 1926 symphonic poem for orchestra with viola obligato by Howard Hanson

== See also ==
- Lux Æterna (film), a 2019 film directed by Gaspar Noé
- Luxturna, trade name for voretigene neparvovec, a gene therapy for the treatment of Leber's congenital amaurosis
- Sanctuary lamp or eternal light
- Lux perpetua (disambiguation), synonymous term
