= Amardeep Singh (disambiguation) =

Amardeep Singh is a Singapore-based Punjabi writer, photographer and documentary filmmaker.

Amardeep Singh may also refer to:

- Amardeep Singh Aujla, Indian Army general
- Amardeep Singh Bhinder, Indian Army general
- Amardeep Singh Gill (born 1968), Punjabi director, screenwriter and lyricist
- Amar Kaleka (Amardeep Singh Kaleka, born 1978), Indian-American film director
