= Hysterical Stars =

Studio album by Head of Femur
- Released: May 25, 2005
- Recorded: Wall To Wall Recording, Chicago, Illinois (2004)
- Genre: Indie rock
- Label: Spin Art Records
- Producer: Head of Femur; Chris Brickley; Dan Dietrich

Head of Femur chronology
Ringodom or Proctor (2003)	Hysterical Stars (2005)

Professional ratings
Review scores
Source	Rating
Pitchfork	7.9/10
PopMatters	6/10 stars

Hysterical Stars is the second album by Chicago-based band Head of Femur. It was released on May 25, 2005, on Spin Art Records.

== Track listing ==
1. "Elliott Gould Is in California Split"
2. "Ringodom or Proctor"
3. "Manhattan"
4. "Percy"
5. "Skirts are Takin' Over"
6. "The Sausage Canoe"
7. "Oh You're Blue"
8. "Song for Richard Manuel"
9. "Born in the Seventies"
10. "Easy Street"
11. "Sometimes Friends"
12. "Jack and the Water Buffalo"
