= Eternal Flame (Belgrade) =

Memorial in the Park of Friendship in Belgrade, Serbia

- Вечна ватра Večna vatra
- Serbia
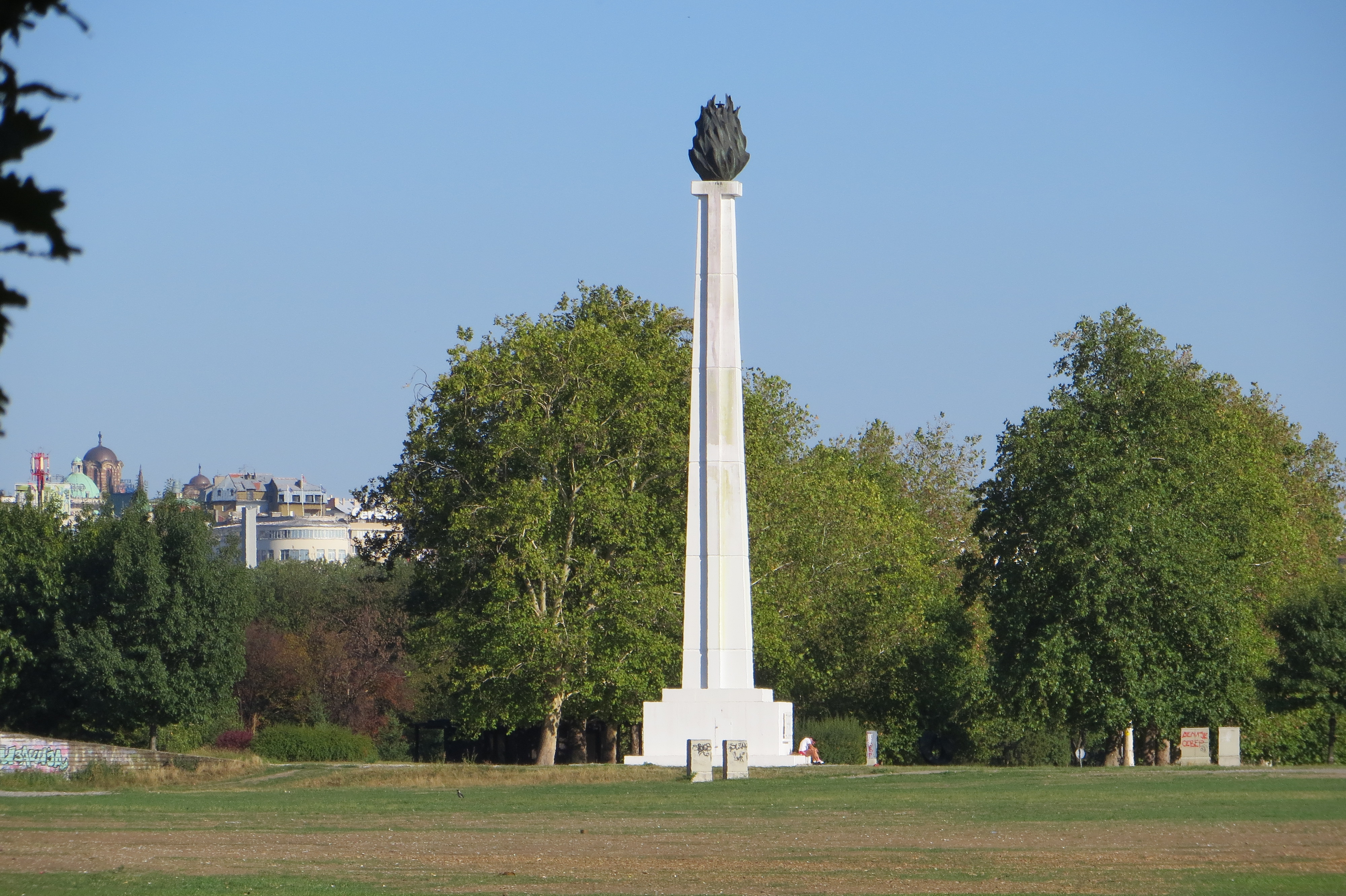
- The Eternal Flame Monument
- For the military and civilian casualties resulting from the 1999 NATO bombing of Serbia
- Unveiled: 12 June 2000
- Location: 44°49′13″N 20°26′06″E; Park of Friendship, Belgrade, Serbia
- Designed by: Marko Stevanović (architect); Svetozar Radović (sculptor); Svetomir Radović (sculptor); Miodrag Cvijić (architect)
- May this flame burn eternally as a memorial to the war that the 19 countries of the NATO pact – the United States, Canada, the United Kingdom, France, Germany, the Netherlands, Italy, Greece, Turkey, Denmark, Belgium, Spain, Portugal, Iceland, Norway, Luxembourg, Poland, Hungary and the Czech Republic – led against Serbia from 24 March to 10 June 1999. May it burn eternally as a memorial to the heroic defense of Serbia in which the entire people took part. May it burn eternally for the whole world. To be free, the world must find in itself the courage and strength with which we fought and defended ourselves in the spring and summer of 1999. The people of Serbia

The Eternal Flame (Serbian: Вечна ватра, Večna vatra) is a memorial in the Park of Friendship in Belgrade, Serbia. It is dedicated to the military and civilian casualties resulting from the NATO bombing of Serbia in 1999 and symbolizes the resistance of the Serbian nation to the attack.

The memorial was unveiled on 12 June 2000, commemorating the first anniversary of the end of the bombing. It was vandalized following the overthrow of Slobodan Milošević in October 2000 and was left to the elements until its partial renovation in 2019, but the flame remained extinguished.

A second eternal flame memorial, commemorating the joint Serbian and Russian victory over fascism, was inaugurated at the Cemetery of the Liberators of Belgrade on 15 December 2020.

== Location ==
The memorial is located in the Park of Friendship, in the Belgrade's neighborhood of Ušće. Park of Friendship is part of the larger Park Ušće, in the municipality of New Belgrade. It is in the park's plane trees alley, some 300 m (980 ft) away from the central landmark in this part of Belgrade, the Ušće Towers skyscrapers. The location of the present monument was formerly occupied by a statue of pharaoh Thutmose III, a gift from the government of Egypt.

== History ==
=== Origin ===
The monument was largely conceived by Mirjana Marković, the leader of the Yugoslav Left and wife of President of FR Yugoslavia Slobodan Milošević. It was originally planned to have a height of 78 meters, to symbolize the 78 days of the NATO bombing of the Federal Republic of Yugoslavia.

It was completed in only 10 days ("overnight") without following any of the legal standards and procedures for such objects, being at odds with the legal procedures stipulated by the city administration. The arrangement of the precast concrete elements actually lasted only 9 days. Over 500 workers were employed in total to finish it in record time, so as to arrange the surrounding plateau area of 10 ha (25 acres). There were never less than 160 workers at one moment on the construction site, and they worked day and night.

The monument was unveiled by Serbian president Milan Milutinović on 12 June 2000. The ceremony was attended by Federal Defence Minister Dragoljub Ojdanić, chairman of the Directorate for the Reconstruction of the Country Milutin Mrkonjić and many other high-ranking officials and members of the cultural and scientific elite. Also, in the transport organized by the state, several thousand people from other parts of Serbia were transported by buses to Belgrade, to attend the unveiling.

=== Later developments ===
During the overthrow of Slobodan Milošević on 5 October 2000, the monument was vandalized and the gas flow was cut off. Notably, an early intervention was the replacement of the word "vatra" (lit. 'fire') with "vutra" – the word for marijuana in the šatrovački street slang. Younger population referred to the entire monument as the "večna vutra" ("eternal marijuana"). In the following years, the obelisk was defaced with graffiti and the letters of the inscription were progressively stolen until only two commas were left in 2006. This has been studied by the Russian-Swedish artist Alexander Vaindorf as an example of the mechanisms of the reconstruction of history. At one point, homeless people dwelled in the base of the monument.

Being built without any necessary permits, the monument was officially considered illegal ("unregulated status"), so it couldn't be legally renovated by any state or local institution. Despite it was built by the state government at the time, it was constructed illegally and not even government can break laws and procedures. In the 2000s, city officials deliberated on the issue as after the political change in 2000, the monument was treated as the "wild [illegal] construction" without any official memorial meaning. Actually, if city itself acted legally in this matter, the monument had to be demolished. Unlike the monument, the surrounding plateau and the green areas were regularly kept.

Still, the city decided not to demolish it "just because it was built by Mira Marković". After consulting with several artists, it was decided to legalize the monument, with certain aesthetic corrections on the memorial. Parts of the plans included replacement of the bronze flame sculptured on top of the obelisk, with fire burning inside, which was deemed contradictory. It was also suggested to replace the inscription with the more appropriate one, which would ease the feeling of the monument as the foreign object in given space. Relocation was also mentioned. City administration then abandoned any plans and works on the subject, claiming that the authors of the monument objected the remodeling, though in some cases the consent is not necessary. One of the co-authors, sculptor Svetomir Radović, who also had issues with the monument as it turned out in the end, said that no one contacted him and that he wouldn't mind the remodeling if he finds it appropriate.

Thanks to an initiative by the Generals and Admirals Club of Serbia, the monument was cleaned in 2009. The Street and Square Names Commission stated that the monument was never restored because it was erected contrary to usual procedure, and was not protected by the Republic Institute for the Protection of Cultural Monuments. The government allocated certain funds to renovate the monument in 2009, but the installations were so damaged that they eventually gave up. The plateau surrounding the monument was fully renovated in 2019.

In March 2019, the Party of Modern Serbia started an initiative to rededicate the monument as a Monument to the Victims of the 1987–2000 Regime.

=== Restoration ===
In March 2020, city administration, which since 2013 has been the same as prior to 2000, announced that the monument will be legalized. Deputy mayor Goran Vesić said that the flame will be lit again on 24 March, on 21st anniversary of the bombing, but also added that gas installations feeding the burner are in extremely bad shape, which may prolong the deadline for a week. However, the flame wasn't lit after all.

== Design ==
The entire sculptural-spatial composition was designed by the sculptors brothers Svetomir and Svetozar Radović, and architects Marko Stevanović and Miodrag Cvijić. However, Mirjana Marković had the final say. The monument consists of a 27 m (89 ft) tall concrete obelisk, topped with a 5-metre-tall (16 ft) bronze fire sculpture from which an eternal flame protrudes. The bronze representation of the flame weights 5 tons. The gas for the eternal flame was supplied by the company "Energogas" and the two gas tanks, fenced by wire, are located left from the monument.

The corners of the pedestal were originally decorated with 4 searchlights ("light cannons"), mounted on the base of the obelisk. Their light beams intersected above the bronze torch on top of the composition, beaming into the sky to the height of 20 km (12 mi). Before the lights were activated in 2000, as Serbia previously had no such light beams in open space, the Belgrade air traffic control had to be notified. The lights were later stolen.

=== Inscription ===
The 5.5-metre-wide (18 ft) eastern wall of the obelisk's base was originally decorated with a short text by Mirjana Marković herself. Her text was named "Eternal Flame". The memorial was also inscribed with the names of its four authors and designers, but also names of the companies which donated money or worked on monument's construction. The letters of the text have all been stolen.

Serbian Cyrillic
Вечна ватра

Ова ватра нека вечно гори као успомена на рат који је 19 земаља НАТО пакта –
Сједињене Америчке Државе, Канада, Велика Британија, Француска, Немачка,
Холандија, Италија, Грчка, Турска, Данска, Белгија, Шпанија, Португалија, Исланд,
Норвешка, Луксембург, Пољска, Мађарска и Чешка –
водило против Србије од 24. марта до 10. јуна 1999. године.

Нека вечно гори и као успомена на херојску одбрану Србије у којој је учествовао цео народ.

Нека вечно гори и за цео свет. Да би био слободан, свет мора да нађе у себи
храброст и снагу са којим смо се ми борили и одбранили у пролеће и лето
1999. године.

Народ Србије

English
The Eternal Flame

May this flame burn eternally as a memorial to the war that the 19 countries of the NATO pact –
the United States, Canada, the United Kingdom, France, Germany,
the Netherlands, Italy, Greece, Turkey, Denmark, Belgium, Spain, Portugal, Iceland,
Norway, Luxembourg, Poland, Hungary and the Czech Republic –
led against Serbia from 24 March to 10 June 1999.

May it burn eternally as a memorial to the heroic defence of Serbia in which the entire people took part.

May it burn eternally for the whole world. To be free, the world must find in itself
the courage and strength with which we fought and defended ourselves in the spring and summer
of 1999.

The people of Serbia

For the lateral sides (northern and southern walls), which are decorated with marble blocks, Marković decided to use quotes from the poems Jugoslavija (Yugoslavia) and Domovini (To the Homeland) by the poet Branko Miljković. Miljković's verses survived as, unlike the main inscription, were carved into the marble.

| Serbian Cyrillic | English |
|---|---|
| Југославија Све што нема ватре у себи сагори Што сагори постаје ноћ Што не изгори рађа дан Бранко Миљковић | Yugoslavia Everything that doesn't have fire in itself burns out What burns out becomes night What doesn't burn out, creates the day Branko Miljković |

| Serbian Cyrillic | English |
|---|---|
| Домовини И када би ме убили Волим те Бранко Миљковић | To the Homeland Even if they were to kill me I love you Branko Miljković |

== Criticism and controversies ==
Despite president Milutinović said at the dedication that "this fire will be the lighthouse for the future generations, a witness that Serbia will defend its freedom as long as we live like a nation in this area", and the pompous unveiling, the monument was disliked by the public from the start as the idea originated from highly disliked Mirjana Marković. The monument and what it represents was deeply analyzed at time. Signing "people of Serbia" under her text was seen as problematic, and especially Marković's usage of Branko Miljković's lyrics, both in terms of their true meaning and author's rights. The monument itself was seen as the symbolic compensation (virtual copy, imperfect reincarnation) for the nearby building of the Ušće Tower, which was bombed and burnt in the attack during the war and was unpleasant evidence for the Serbian political elite which aimed to present itself as the architect of the new Serbian reality. The regular cuts of the design and white surfaces were to outshine the sooty and burnt, at time still not reconstructed, Ušće Tower.

Co-author Svetomir Radović, criticized the text compiled by Mirjana Marković, considering it improper for the work of art, and too long. Instead of the lyrics and listing the names of the countries which bombed Serbia, he thought that the inscription "Eternal flame for the victioms of NATO aggression - people of Serbia" would be better solution. Radović added that the monument wasn't built by Marković, not the state, but by the tax payers. He also opted for the concrete pedestal to be plated with marble and granite slabs so it could be more easily cleaned from the graffiti, but due to the hastiness in construction, this was left out.

Some described the bronze fire on top of the obelisk looking more like a rose or the dome. Ljubiša Strojimirović, president of the Generals and Admirals Club of Serbia which instigated the partial renovation of the monument in 2009, said that the monument is on an excellent location, but that its design is esthetically not the best solution.

The fate of the statue of the pharaoh Thutmose III is unknown. A gift from the government of Egypt, it was removed to make way for the new monument. In the process it disappeared, and is believed to be part of some private collection today. In 2010, the city tried to find the whereabouts of the pharaoh's sculpture, but it ultimately failed or abandoned the search.

== Eternal Flame II ==
Belgrade New Cemetery is located in Belgrade's municipality of Zvezdara. Part of the cemetery's complex, the Cemetery of Belgrade Liberators built in 1954, contains graves of 2,944 National Liberation Army soldiers and 961 Red Army soldiers and the mass grave of 1,381 National Liberation Army soldiers and 711 Red Army soldiers who died during the 1944 Belgrade Offensive.

During his visit to Belgrade in February 2020, Russian Minister of Defence Sergey Shoygu brought a pot of Russian earth, which was poured at the location of the future memorial, also named Eternal Flame, thus marking the beginning of its construction. The sculptural-architectural composition is work of the Russian sculptor Andrey Tyrtyshnikov. Opening was planned for 26 March, during the visit of the Russian foreign minister Sergey Lavrov to Serbia. This was all postponed due to the COVID-19 pandemic. In September 2020 it was announced that the memorial will be finished by the end of the year.

On 14 December 2020, the flame was lit from the eternal flame at the Tomb of the Unknown Soldier in Moscow and transported to Belgrade by the Russian Defence ministry's plane. It was lit the next day, in the presence of Serbian president Aleksandar Vučić and minister Lavrov.

== Gallery ==
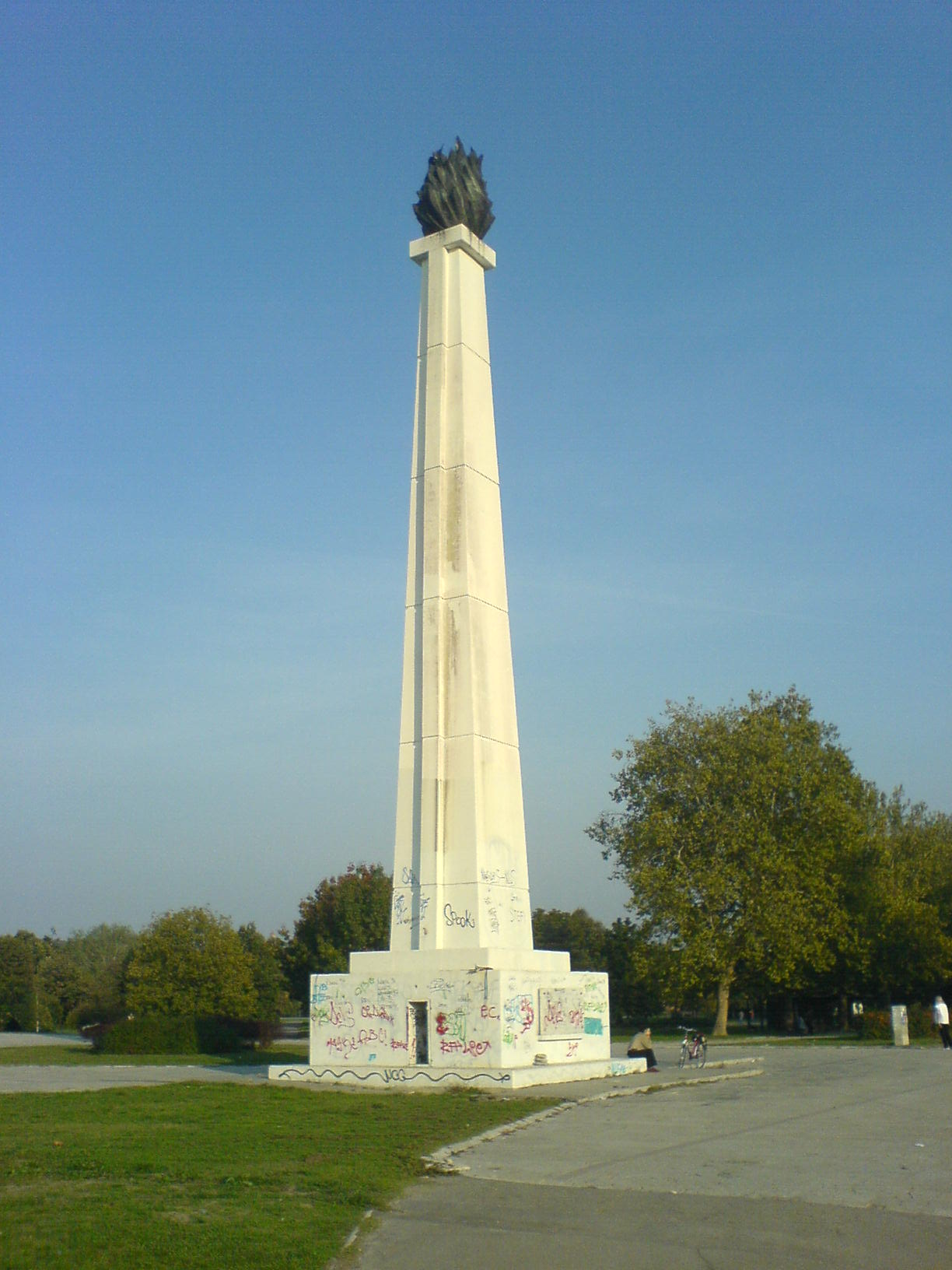
The monument vandalized with graffiti in 2008.

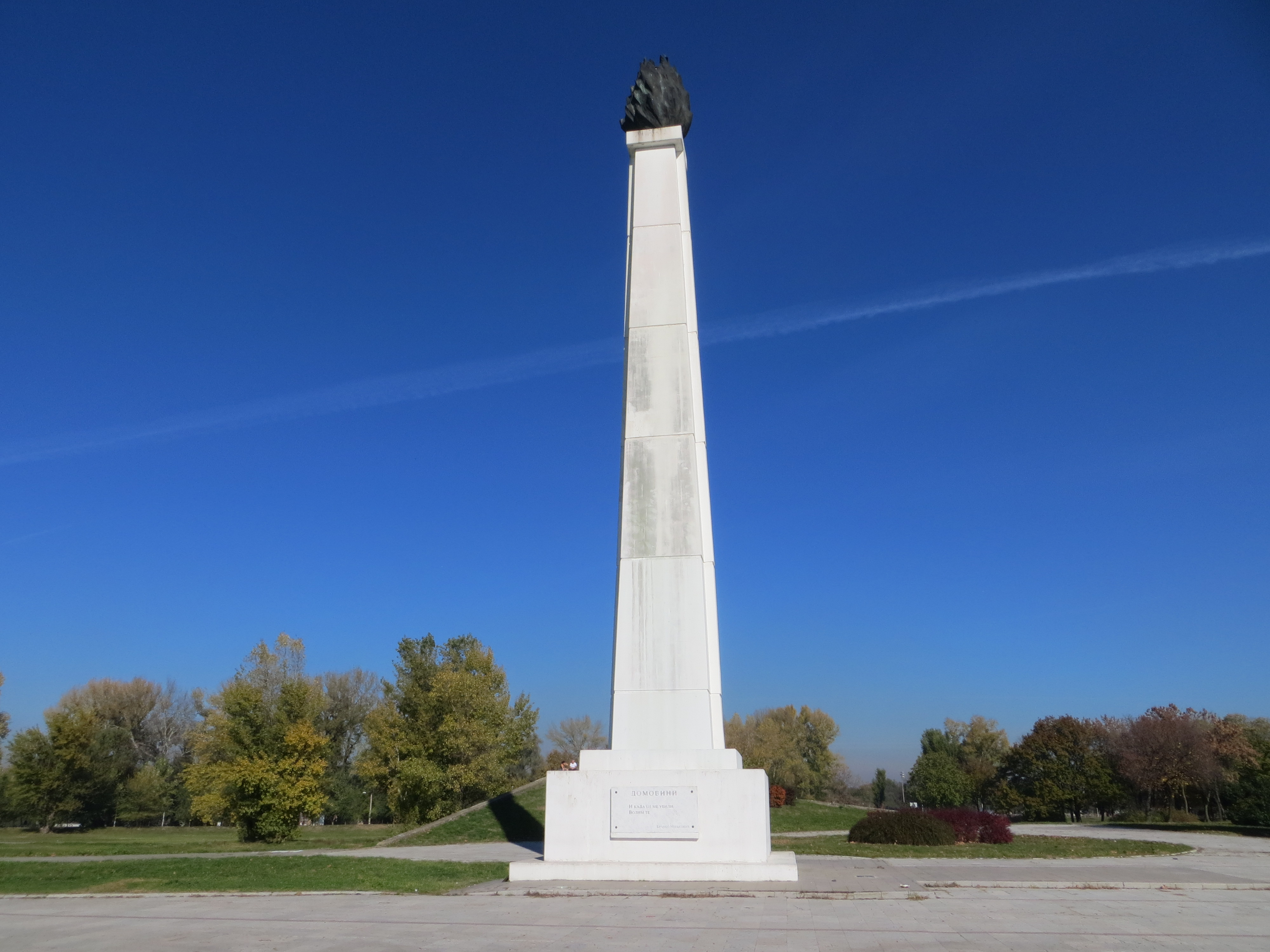
The monument restored after 2019.

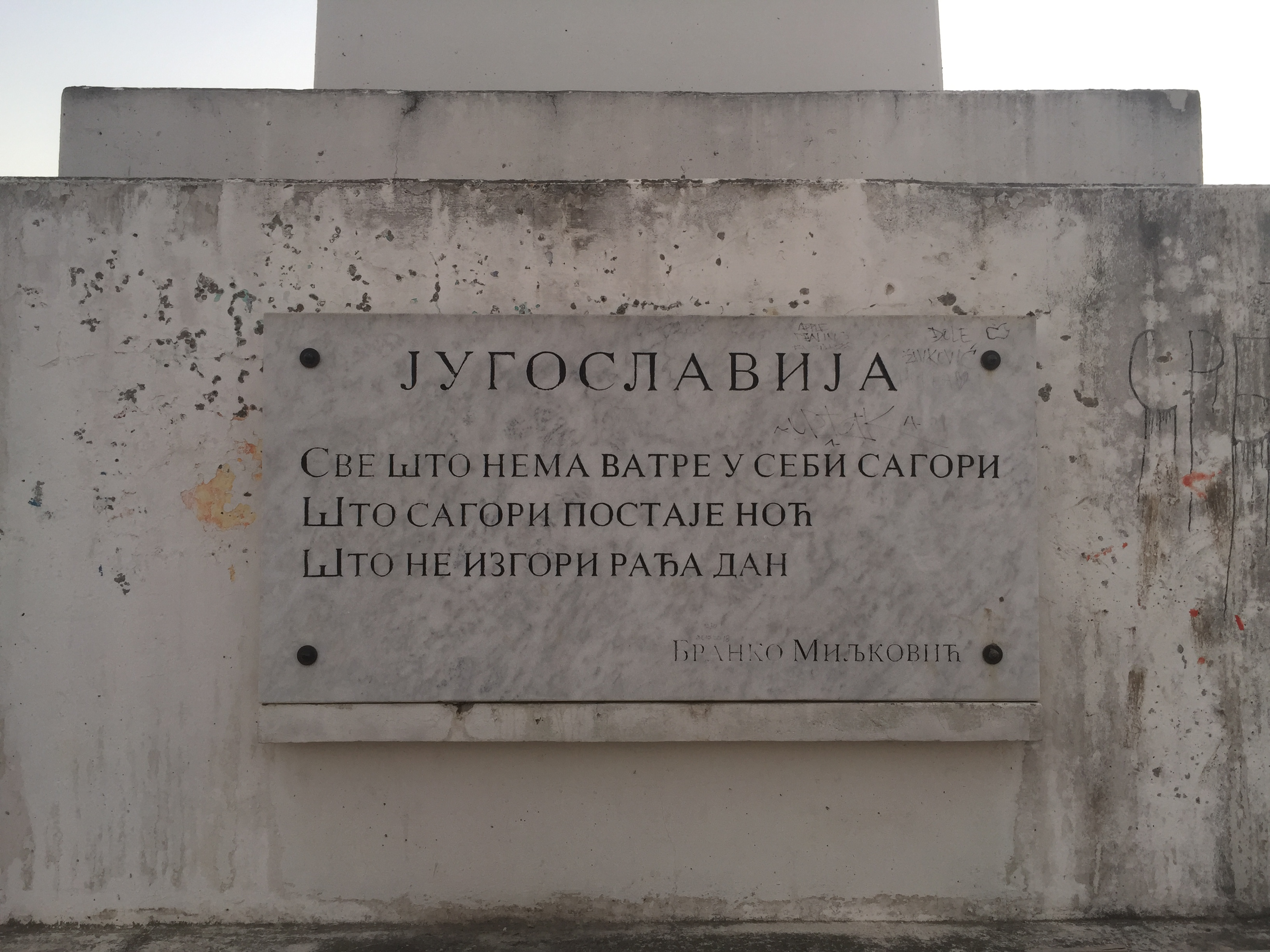
Plaque containing the poem Yugoslavia by Branko Miljković, northern wall of the obelisk.

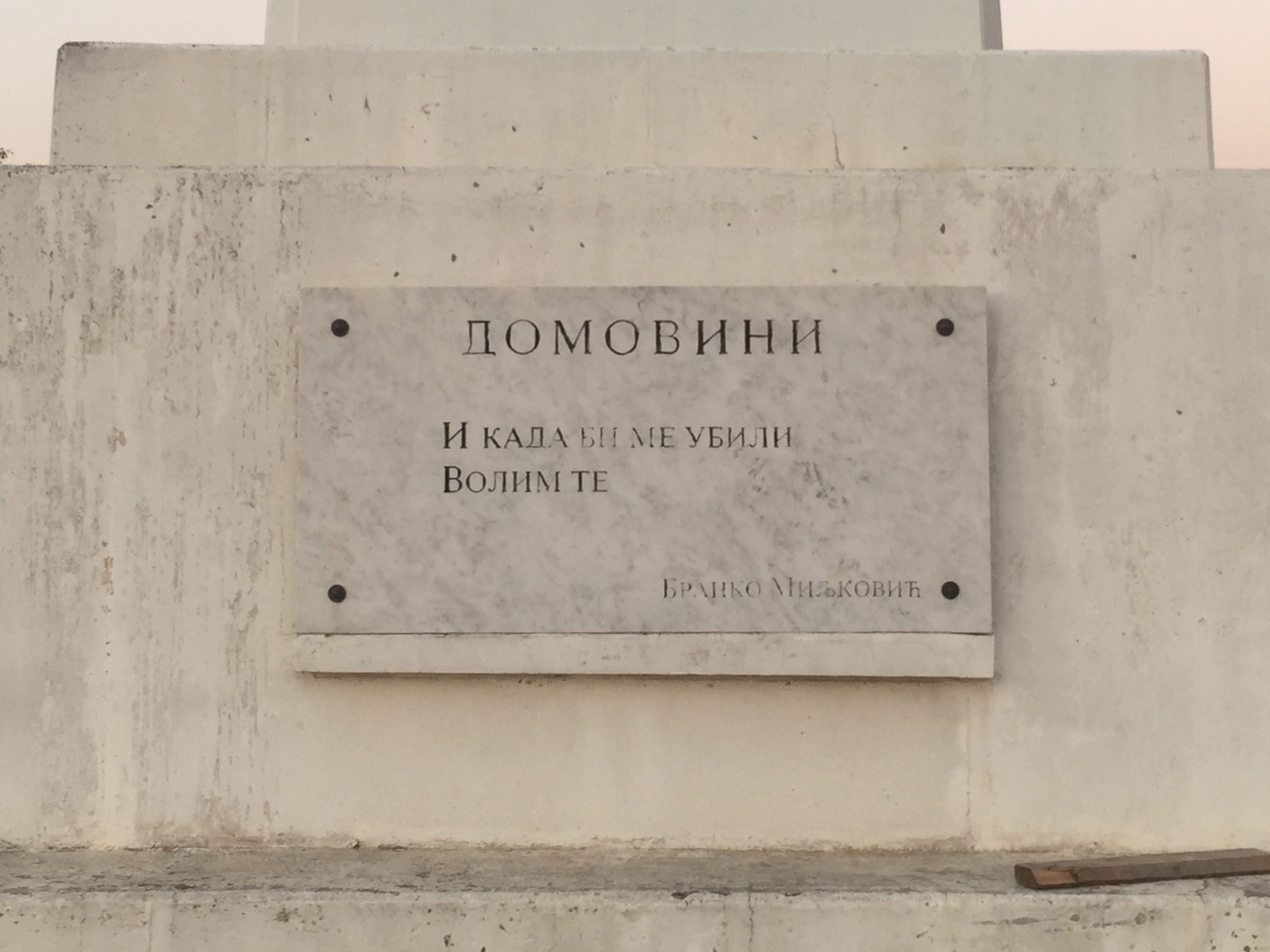
Plaque containing the poem To the Homeland by Branko Miljković, southern wall of the obelisk.

== See also ==
- Park of Friendship, New Belgrade
- Mirjana Marković
