= Thoughts of Ionesco =

1990s post-hardcore band from Detroit

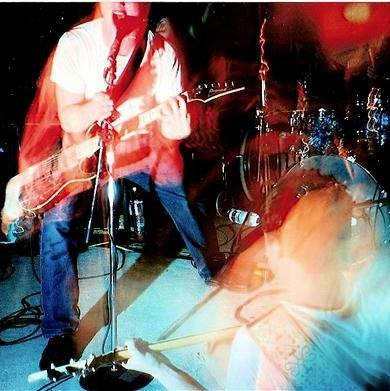
Thoughts of Ionesco in Wayne, Michigan

Thoughts of Ionesco was a Detroit-based post-hardcore band extant 1996–1999 known for detuned guitars, screamed vocals, complex arrangements, improvisational sections inspired by free jazz, and their destructive live performances.

== Background ==
Formed in 1996, the band was briefly a five-piece named Building featuring members of the melodic hardcore band Empathy in addition to founding members Sean Madigan Hoen, Brian Repa, and Nathan Miller. After reducing the line-up to a three-piece, they recorded a demo and played a house show in Ypsilanti, MI under the name Triptych; the show was stopped by local police after the band finished their first song. Their demo tape displayed influences of My War-era Black Flag mixed with then contemporary hardcore groups like Deadguy and Universal Order of Armageddon; the band's sound was further complicated by the metal-influenced double-bass drumming by Repa. Prior to an early show opening for Washington D.C.'s Damnation A.D., the band renamed themselves Thoughts of Ionesco (referencing the absurdist playwright Eugène Ionesco), a decision motivated by their desire for an additional guitarist and what they perceived as constraint in a moniker signifying a set of three. The band, however, would never find an appropriate second guitar-player.

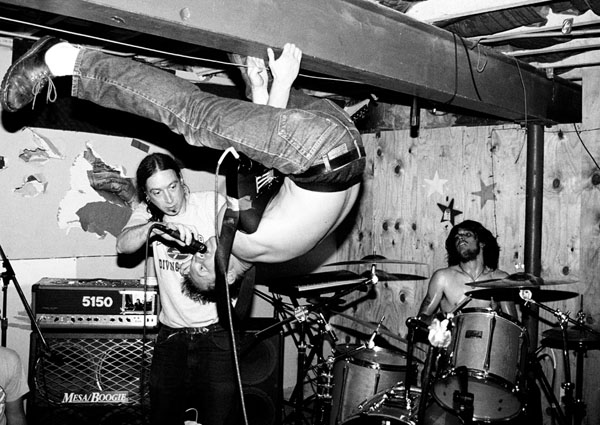
Thoughts of Ionesco in Pontiac, MI. 1999.

Two songs culled from their Triptych demo tape were released as a 7-inch on the band's own record label, Cascade Records, in late 1996. Hoen and Repa were in high school at the time, limiting their performances to weekend excursions around the Midwest. In December 1996, they recorded what would become their album ...And Then There Was Motion with Tim Pak at Woodshed Studios in Oak Park, Michigan. Pak also went on to engineer and produce the next two albums. In early 1997, Michigan hardcore label Conquer the World Records offered to release their latest recording, but the band offered instead a remixed version of their demo tape, which was released as The Triptych Session. The album was well received in hardcore fanzines. Thoughts of Ionesco toured North America in the summer of 1997, frequently with their friends Wallside.

Their second album, ...And Then There Was Motion, was released later in 1997 by Kalamazoo Michigan label Makoto Records. The recording revealed a heavier sound and more complex arrangements and was described by Alternative Press Magazine as "an ultimate realization of pain-through-sound." Throughout 1997 TOI performed shows with North American hardcore bands Converge, Coalesce, Dropdead, His Hero is Gone, Botch, as well as numerous punk and hardcore festivals. A split 7-inch with Detroit band Cromwell was released later that year.

In early 1998, original drummer Brian Repa left the band for the first time and was replaced by Derek Grant of the Suicide Machines (and later Alkaline Trio). With Grant, the band began exploring noise sections, extended improvisation and epic song structures inspired by Mahavishnu Orchestra and electric-period Miles Davis while simultaneously seeking an even heavier sound in the vein of Swans and Godflesh. The band recorded its third LP, A Skin Historic, with Grant in summer of 1998. It was slated to be released by the well-distributed Alley Sweeper Records and received advanced reviews, yet the label folded. Grant left the band and was replaced by Brett Fratangelo. The album was soon released on Makoto Recordings. At this time the band added a live saxophonist and, disillusioned with the hardcore scene, began opening for extreme metal bands like Brutal Truth and Nile. In February 1999 Thoughts of Ionesco contributed two exclusive songs to Utilitarian Records' Various Artists compilation The Collateral Compilation.

In May 1999, Thoughts of Ionesco toured the United States and Canada with Small Brown Bike and Dead Season. Amid personal turmoil and differences with Fratangelo, the band cancelled both a U.S. and European tour that summer. Drummer Brian Repa returned for the band's final recording, For Detroit, From Addiction, which was tracked days after their final show in Ann Arbor Michigan on November 20, 1999. The album was released two year later by At Arms Mechanics. In 2006, Chicago label Seventh Rule released an anthology CD, The Scar is Our Watermark, featuring selected, remastered songs from each of the band's releases.

In 2014, Alternative Press listed Thoughts of Ionesco in their article "Twenty '90s Bands that Need to Reunite Already."

Also in 2014, Hoen, now a writer, published a memoir Songs Only You Know, in which he recounted a troubled young adulthood and family life. The book features several scenes in which he performs and travels as part of Thoughts of Ionesco. The book was a Barnes and Noble Discovery Selection, a Michigan Notable Book, and was named a top-ten book of 2014 by Rolling Stone.

In 2017 TOI reunited with drummer Derek Grant to record a three-song EP, Skar Cymbals, and on June 24 played their first show in nearly eighteen years at the Magic Stick in Detroit, Michigan. Longtime friend and fan Jeff Tuttle (formerly of Dillinger Escape Plan) joined the band as second guitarist. Skar Cymbals was released to underground acclaim, although plans for future performances and releases were not announced.

== Members ==
- Sean Madigan Hoen – Vocals, Guitar
- Nathan Miller – Bass
- Brian Repa – Drums 1996-1997, 1999
- Mike Derrick – Guitar 1997
- Derek Grant – Drums 1998, 2017
- Brett Fratangelo – Drums 1999
- Scott Bridges – Saxophone 1999
- Jeff Tuttle — Guitar 2017

== Discography ==
- Triptych demo tape (1996, Cascade Records)
- Thoughts Of Ionesco 7-inch (1996, Cascade Records)
- The Triptych Session compilation (1997, Conquer the World Records)
- ...And Then There Was Motion LP (1997, Makoto Recordings)
- Split 7-inch with Cromwell (1997, LongBow Masterworks Records)
- A Skin Historic LP (1999, Makoto Recordings)
- Abnormalities compilation (2000, Cascade Records)
- For Detroit, From Addiction LP (2001, At Arms Mechanics)
- Split 7-inch with Heads Will Roll (2005, Down Peninsula Audio)
- The Scar Is Our Watermark compilation (2006, Seventh Rule Recordings)
- Skar Cymbals EP (2017, Corpse Flower Records)
- LIVE DETROIT LP (2024, Beginners Tapes)

== See also ==
- Leaving Rouge

== Other sources ==
- Punknews
- Blabbermouth
- Stylus Magazine
- "12 ’90s Emo Bands That Need To Reunite Already". Alternative Press.
