= Maria Perpétua =

- Born: 1790
- Died: 1817 (aged 26–27); Ilha de São Sebastião
- Cause of death: Murdered by husband

Maria Perpétua (1790, Portugal – 1817, Ilha de São Sebastião), was an alleged Brazilian witch. She was the central figure in a famous murder case in Brazil.

Maria Perpétua was born in Portugal and emigrated to the Portuguese colony of Brazil, where she settled at Ilha de São Sebastião. She came to be infamous for reputed witchcraft and Devil worship. From circa 1812, the parish received complaints about her claimed practice in witchcraft. Among the accusers were captain Domingos, one of the most notable slave traders in the region.

In a famous case, Maria Perpétua was accused of having murdered a slave, Joana, by use of magic. Domingos, as well as several other parishioners, lay forward a complaint to the local priest alleging that she had manufactured magical objects in order to create the illness which killed Joana.

When the governor of São Paulo allowed for the residence of Maria Perpétua to be searched, several magic objects allegedly made to practice magic were found, among them also a human ear. Maria Perpétua was stabbed to death by her husband and was thereby never brought to trial.
