= Head of Femur (band) =

- Origin: Chicago, Illinois, United States
- Genre: Indie rock
- Years active: 2001–present

Head of Femur is an American Chicago-based band, formed in November 2001 by Nebraska natives Mike Elsener, Ben Armstrong and Matt Focht. The band was initially conceived as a forum for the three to compose pop songs while awaiting the reformation of their previous band, Pablo's Triangle. As the weeks passed the reformation looked unlikely.

With a large catalog of songs already taking shape by early 2002, Head of Femur began to recruit musicians to flesh out the lineup for live performance. The nature of the music demanded more than the traditional rock band instrumentation, so strings, trumpet, and orchestral percussion were added along with drums and bass guitar. Head of Femur played their first show at a small club in Chicago in March 2002. They made plans to record a demo with local producer Jim Bentley and perform at Chicago's The Empty Bottle.

On the strength of that demo, Portland's Greyday Productions signed Head of Femur in November 2002. Recording sessions for the band's debut album, Ringodom or Proctor, took place in March 2003. Ten of Ringodom's eleven songs were among the first of the dozens composed by Elsener, Armstrong and Focht, and had been intended to comprise the first record since their inception. The album was recorded at Lincoln, Nebraska's Presto! Recording Studios with A. J. Mogis.

Following more than a year of touring as an 8-piece (2 guitars, trumpet, trombone, violin, drums, keys, 4 vocals and percussion) with such acts as Bright Eyes and Rilo Kiley, as well as outings on their own, Head of Femur signed with Brooklyn's spinART Records in the summer of 2004.

In August 2004, Head of Femur set about recording their next full-length record. Hysterical Stars was recorded at Wall To Wall in Chicago with engineers Chris Brickley and Dan Dietrich and released in late May 2005.

Head Of Femur spent 2005 touring with Architecture in Helsinki, Wilco, Dr. Dog, The Spinto Band, The Bruces, Andrew Bird, Matt Pond PA and headlining tours themselves. They were the first band on the first Intonation Music Festival and performed at the Wicker Park Festival, CMJ and SXSW.

During a short break from touring in the Fall of 2005, the group laid down four tracks mostly live at Truckstop Studios in Chicago. The recordings showcased a more band-oriented sound as opposed to the multi-tracked orchestra captured on their first two albums. The songs, including covers from The Band and Neil Young and Crazy Horse were released in late 2005 as an iTunes exclusive EP. Head Of Femur finished up the year by stripping the lineup down to a more traditional five-piece lineup of the core trio plus Nick "The Chancellor" Westra on bass/vocals and Tyson Thurston on keys. This lineup played two shows on New Year's Eve in Chicago.

May 2007, Head of Femur had completed work on their third full-length, "Great Plains", due to be released March 25, 2008.

After many members moved back to their home state of Nebraska in 2013, they were approached by Mike Semrad, owner of Sower Records, in early 2016 wanting to release a new record. Members had been working with Matt Focht, via the internet, working out tunes and being creative. After numerous sessions in Lincoln at Circle M Studios, 'Hear! Hear! Tunemaker' was finally completed in the Fall of 2016. The new vinyl record is set to be released February 2017 at the historic Pla Mor Ballroom.

== Band members ==
- Matt Focht - vocals, guitar, drums
- Ben Armstrong - keyboards, drums, vocals
- Michael Elsener - guitar, vocals
- Darryl Rivers - bass, vocals
- James Cuato Ballarin - Keyboards, Saxophone

== Discography ==
- Bend the Light (2026, Greyday Records)
- Hear! Hear! Tunemaker (2017· Sower Records)
- Great Plains (2008 · Greyday Records)
- Leader and the Falcon EP (2007)
- Hysterical Stars (2005 · Spin Art Records)
- Do The Tavern And Other Tall Tales iTunes EP (2005)
- Ringodom or Proctor (2003 · Greyday Records)
