= Merlin Book 11: The Eternal Flame =

2006 novel by T. A. Barron

- The Eternal Flame Cover
- Author: T. A. Barron
- Original title: The Great Tree of Avalon: The Eternal Flame
- Illustrator: David Elliot
- Cover artist: Larry Rostant and Tony Sahara
- Language: English
- Series: Merlin Saga
- Genre: Fantasy
- Publisher: Philomel Books
- Publication date: 19 October 2006
- Publication place: United States
- Media type: Print (Hardback & Paperback)
- Pages: 377 (hardcover edition)
- ISBN: 0-399-23764-X
- OCLC: 58832613
- LC Class: PZ7.B27567 Sha 2005
- Preceded by: Merlin Book 10: Shadows on the Stars
- Followed by: Merlin Book 12: The Book of Magic
- Website: The Eternal Flame

The Eternal Flame is a fantasy novel by T. A. Barron, published by Penguin Young Readers Group. The book is the eleventh novel in the 12-book series known as Merlin Saga. It was originally published as The Great Tree of Avalon: The Eternal Flame, the final novel in The Great Tree of Avalon trilogy, and is set in a world made up of a great tree and its seven roots inhabited by creatures.

== Plot introduction ==
Avalon is at the edge of destruction. It seems as if the wicked spirit warlord Rhita Gawr has already gained his victory. The ancient tree has but tiniest hope in the young wizard Tamwyn, the apprentice priestess Elli, the fierce eagleman Scree, the graceful elf maiden Brionna, and the allies of Avalon who hope to prevail over Rhita Gawr's forces. The fate of Avalon lies in three key battles: one involves defeating an immortal serpent (Rhita Gawr himself) and relighting stars; one destroying a powerful crystal, the crystal of vengeláno created by Rhita Gawr; and one on the Plains of Isenwy that will result in the death of many innocent lives. The new wizard, Tamwyn, needs to reach the stars in order to prevail over Rhita Gawr and save Avalon. All of the forces of Avalon must unite to save their world from Rhita Gawr, just as they once did in Fincayra.

== Characters ==
=== Main characters ===
- Tamwyn: A young man who has for the majority of his lifetime lived in the realm of Rahnawyn with his adopted brother, Scree. He has suspicions that he might be the Dark Child destined to bring an end to Avalon, as he is 17 years old and seems to think there is a hidden darkness in him. His name means "Dark Flame" in the language of the flamelons, his mother's people. His father is Krystallus, Merlin's explorer son. Although they have never met, Tamwyn seeks to follow in his father's footsteps, even before learning of his father's identity. Loves Elli.
- Scree: An eagleboy, having the ability to change between human form and that of an eagle. After his parents were murdered, he is adopted by Tamwyn's mother Halona, and raised by her until he is ten years old. As their mother attempts to teach the two the art of portalseeking, wherein the traveler is teleported through the vascular system of Avalon itself, she is killed by the assassin-like birds called ghoulacas. The two boys enter the portal to escape. Tamwyn is sent to Olanabram, while Scree returns to Rahnawyn. The two then spend the next seven years in search of one another.
- Elliriyanna Lailoken/Elli: A young trainee at the Society of the Whole. Her parents were killed in gnome raids; she was herself kept in slavery for the majority of her life, clinging to the only remnant of her parents: a harp made by her father. After escaping shortly before the events of this book took place, she goes to the Drumadian compound to become a priestess, hoping to follow in her father's footsteps. Her memories continue to haunt her. Loves Tamwyn and is consequently somewhat frustrated by his shortcomings.
- Nuic: Elli's faithful maryth; one of the diverse creatures voluntarily bound in partnership to Drumadian priests and priestesses. He is an old creature, often referring to ancient events at which he was present. He is a small pinnacle sprite; a rotund mountain-dweller whose color changes according to his thoughts and emotions. He is often sarcastic and impatient, though he is wise and witty. Nuic is said to have been the maryth to Rhia, daughter of the Drumadian founder.
- Kulwych: An evil sorcerer who desires to gain totalitarian control of Avalon. He especially hates Merlin and wishes to rid Avalon of that wizard's image. He is shown to be a servant of Rhita Gawr. Kulwych is known as White Hands because he hides his battle-scarred body beneath a cloak, allowing only his perfectly white hands to show. His plan involves the creation of a dam by which to capture the water of Geyser Crystillia, wherein is eláno enough to make a crystal. He plans then to corrupt the crystal, making it a thing of destruction rather than creation. Having done so, he is reduced to Rhita Gawr's second-in-command, though he retains his former manner toward his own minions.
- Brionna: A young elf from El Urien who is captured by White Hands' arms master, Harlech. She is forced to work on Kulwych's dam. Later, Kulwych blackmails her into stealing the staff Ohnyalei from Scree, who has been its keeper, by threatening the life of her grandfather Tressimir. Brionna obeys, fearing to lose her grandfather. She meets and befriends Shim. Brionna, having stolen Ohnyalei, is betrayed by Kulwych. She later abets the destruction of his dam. Brionna accompanies Elli on the quest to destroy the crystal of vengeláno.
- Rhita Gawr: A shape-changing, immortal spirit who seeks to dominate all the worlds. Emerges slowly into physical form throughout the first two books. He is arrogant, cruel, egocentric, and prone to undervaluing all whom he meets.

=== Supporting characters ===
- Shim: A giant who has been reduced to the size of a dwarf, not once but twice, having grown to giant-size in between. He is as old as Avalon itself. Shim is a friend of Merlin's, encountered first in The Lost Years. In The Great Tree of Avalon, he befriends Brionna. Shim always speaks with a particular mannerism, distinguished by his haphazard use of suffices and his use of synonymous adjectives such as "certainly, definitely, absolutely" in trios.
- Henni: Henni is a hoolah; a mischievous, reckless, comical person who sees life as a game. He enjoys seeing people become frustrated or hot-tempered, because they are then excited and therefore appear absurd to him. He fulfills this liking by joining the travelling group consisting of Elli, Nuic, Llynia, Llynia's maryth Fairlyn, and Tamwyn, whom he teases relentlessly. Henni, for his part, becomes more sober as a result of his experiences of violence and danger. Although Tamwyn presumes him dead after their involuntary separation en route to the stars, it is implied at the end of the book that he is still alive. He is reunited with Tamwyn in The Eternal Flame and accompanies him further up the Tree.
- Llynia: A priestess of the Society of the Whole. Llynia is excessively arrogant, egocentric, and anthropocentric. She torments Elli constantly and abuses all whom she meets, except the gardener Hanwan Bellamir, who is as anthropocentric as she despite his gentler demeanor. Later, she joins the anthropocentric movement "Humanity First", which seeks to impose human rule on all nonhuman life.
- Batty Lad/Basilgarrad: A small, green-eyed, bat-like creature who joins Tamwyn. Batty Lad is happy-go-lucky, cheerful, and talkative. He speaks very quickly, with a tendency toward colorful language. His origins are implied to be of great significance. Although Tamwyn presumes him dead after their involuntary separation en route to the stars, it is implied at the end of the book that he is still alive. In The Eternal Flame, Batty Lad is revealed to be none other than Basilgarrad, the mighty dragon who once carried Merlin to the stars; repeating this history, Basilgarrad carries Tamwyn to relight the constellation Wizard's Staff, so that the doors to Rhita Gawr's world may be closed. Because Rhita Gawr has taken dragon's form, Basilgarrad fights him directly.
- Rhiannon: T. A. Barron's re-invention of the Lady of the Lake. Rhia, as she is sometimes called, is vital, optimistic, friendly, humorous, courteous, compassionate, wise, and skilled in magical arts. She is very much in touch with nature, though at times she surrenders to her frustrations. She is Merlin's sister and Tamwyn's great-aunt.
- Krystallus Eopia: Though he did not actually take action in the book, Krystallus was often mentioned. Son of the wizard Merlin and deer-woman Hallia, Krystallus was a great explorer who died on his greatest expedition, the journey to the stars. The Lady of the Lake later revealed to Tamwyn that Krystallus was his father. Tamwyn finds Krystallus' grave at the knothole. The Lamp dark.
- Deth Macoll: An assassin and master of disguise. Poses as a jester to infiltrate Elli's party. Later reveals himself, only to seemingly fall to his death. He is later revealed to be alive in The Eternal Flame, wherein he is truly killed while attacking Kulwych.
- Olewyn: Though not named until Shadows on the Stars, he is quite prominent in all three books. Appearing several times, he is a mysterious bard whose knowledge of the status quo far exceeds that which he chooses to reveal. He is notable for his broad, white beard; for his skills of music and poetry; and for the creature called a museo, which dwells in his hat. This creature possesses the most musical voice of all voices in Avalon. He takes part in the final Battle of Avalon, at the end of which he is revealed to be a disguised Merlin.
- Llue: A young priest from the Society of the Whole, he decides to leave to help Brionna and Shim go to the Humanity First campus to try and prevent the coming war. Llue knew Elli's father, even traveled with him at times, before Elli's father was brutally murdered in a Gnome raid on his house. Llue is third in command at the Society of the Whole, wanting only peace and harmony to all of Avalon, but he knows that is no possible unless the people of Avalon fight for their freedom. He is also selected to be one of the speakers in the parley.

== The Seven Root-Realms of the Great Tree of Avalon ==
The Great Tree of Avalon splits into seven roots (realms):

- Airroot (Y Swylarna)
- Mudroot (Maloch)
- Stoneroot (Olanabram)
- Waterroot (Brynchilla)
- Fireroot (Rahnawyn)
- Shadowroot (Lastrael)
- Woodroot (El Urien)

Each is named for the primary component of its environments.

== The Middle Realm of The Great Tree of Avalon ==
The Middle Realm of Avalon is the trunk of the Great Tree, which has a few important places:

- The Great Hall of Heartwood
- The Spiral Cascades
- Murals of the Story Painters
- Lost Realm of the Fire Angels (Ayonowyn)
- Merlin's Knothole

== The Starward Realms of the Great Tree of Avalon ==
The Starward Realms of Avalon are the branches and stars. Much of The Eternal Flame occurs here.

=== The Stars ===
- Pegasus
- The Wizard's Staff
- Golden Bough
- The Mysteries (also known as The Circles)
- Fires of Ogallad the Worthy
- The River of Time

=== The Branches ===
- Bubbling Pits of Resin
- Holosarr "Lowest Realm" to the Taliwonn
- Merlin's Pinnacle
- Starlight's Palette: Lakes of Astonishing Clarity
- River of Time (Cryll Onnawesh)
- Stargazing Point of Angus Oge
- Outer Holosarr
- Forestlands of Etollassa
