= Intonation Music Festival =

The Intonation Music Festival was a yearly summer music festival held at Union Park in Chicago, Illinois.

== 2005 ==
The festival was held on July 16–17, 2005. It was conceived of and launched by Skyline Chicago, who hired Pitchfork Media to curate, and supported by Microsoft (by way of the Xbox), Tower Records, WLUW and PETA2, among others.

The admission price was $15 per day, with a limited number of $22 two-day passes that were available online only. Gates opened at noon each day.

The festival had been announced as slated for Chicago's Pulaski Park, but the festival was moved twice, ending up in the much larger Union Park.

=== Saturday, July 16 ===
- Headliner: Tortoise
- Death from Above 1979, The Go! Team, Broken Social Scene, Four Tet, Magnolia Electric Co., A.C. Newman, The M's, Head of Femur, Pelican and Prefuse 73.

==== DJ Tent ====
- Will Oldham, Jean Grae, and Laurent Lebec (member of Pelican)

=== Sunday, July 17 ===
- Headliner: The Decemberists
- Les Savy Fav, The Wrens, Deerhoof, Andrew Bird, Out Hud, Xiu Xiu, Dungen, The Hold Steady and Thunderbirds Are Now!.

==== DJ Tent ====
- Diplo, El-P, and Reine Fiske (member of Dungen)

== 2006 ==
The 2006 festival was held at Union Park and curated by VICE Records and supported by KEXP. Pitchfork and independent concert promoter Mike Reed withdrew their support from the festival following their split with promotion company Skyline Chicago, who organizes the festival. Pitchfork staged their own music festival in 2006, the Pitchfork Music Festival.

Tickets went on sale on Monday, March 13 and cost $35 for a two-day pass and $20 for a single-day pass, along with a limited quantity of $25 two-day passes available.

=== Saturday, June 24 ===
- Headliner: The Streets
- Ghostface Killah, The Stills, Lady Sovereign, Boredoms, Roky Erickson, José González, Devin the Dude, High on Fire, Chromeo, Erase Errata, 90 Day Men, Favourite Sons

=== Sunday, June 25 ===
- Headliner: Bloc Party
- Dead Prez, Robert Pollard, Jon Brion, Blue Cheer, Lupe Fiasco, Annie, Rhymefest, The Constantines, The Sword, Panthers, Bill Dolan, Tyrades, Neil Hamburger

== 2007 ==
The Chicago Sun-Times reported on April 6 that the festival would not be continuing for what would have been its third year. "'We looked at what was happening this summer, and the festival crowds of Chicago are being well served at this point,' Intonation spokesman David Singer said, citing competition from the Pitchfork Music Festival in Union Park on July 13–15, Eric Clapton's Crossroads Guitar Festival at Toyota Park on July 28, Lollapalooza in Grant Park on Aug. 3-5 and the combination of the Hideout Block Party and Metro's 25th anniversary celebration at Elston and Wabansia on Sept. 7-9."

A free performance of local Chicago acts sponsored by Intonation Music Festival LLC was held October 7, 2007 at the Museum of Contemporary Art, Chicago.
