= Nick Marko =

American musician (born 1978)

- Birth name: Nicholas Thomas Marko
- Born: November 24, 1978 (age 46)
- Origin: Dearborn, Michigan, United States
- Genres: Indie rock; alternative rock; punk rock; alternative country
- Occupations: musician; entrepreneur; composer
- Instrument: Multi-Instrumentalist
- Years active: 1993–present
- Labels: The Militia Group; Greyday Productions; Down Peninsula Audio; ALP Music
- Website: Nick Marko; ALP Music; Singer Soldier; Float Here Forever

Nicholas Thomas Marko (born November 24, 1978) is an American musician, known for being a multi-instrumentalist, playing the guitar, drums and piano for bands such as The Holy Fire, Singer & Soldier, Leaving Rouge, and Levagood in the 2000s and 2010s. He is also an entrepreneur, having started up the company ALP Music, LLC in 2010.

== Musical career ==
Marko joined his first band, Gutwrench, as a drummer in 1993. Three years later in 1996, he played drums in his second band The Habs. Disgruntled at not being able to find a guitarist who liked Fugazi, Marko picked up the guitar in 1998 and proceeded to record his first three-song CD in Joe "Butter" Reynolds' Detroit-area basement studio. Having acquired a better understanding of recording & songwriting, he and childhood friend - bassist Frank Muscat, formed the band Levagood in 1999, which Marko fronted. They released one album "Never Trust The Experts" in the year 2000, recorded at 40 Oz Sound Studios in Ann Arbor. Later on that year, the band played many shows; opening for acts like O.A.R. at the famed Ann Arbor venue the Blind Pig. They then recorded a second album at Woodshed Studios under the direction of Tim Pak from the bands Angry Red Planet and Salt Miners. The album "Curse of A Thousand Legends" was never released. Disgruntled by the band's breakup, Marko moved to Sherman, Texas, where he worked as a roofer. He started the foundation for what is his current project: Singer & Soldier during his time in California, Arizona, and Texas. Marko moved back to the Detroit area in 2003. Upon releasing the Singer & Soldier EP, he met his bandmates for The Holy Fire. On January 1, 2004, the Holy Fire recorded their debut album in Toronto at Signal to Noise Studio. The project was engineered by Canadian music producer Jon Drew. The band's first show was on April 9, 2004 at the Magic Stick Detroit, opening for TV on the Radio. Their Toronto EP made it into the hands of Flaming Lips bassist Michael Ivins, who would go on to produce their first EP at Ferndale's Temper Mill Studios. After this, they started playing and touring on a constant basis, playing with bands such as Metric, the Constantines, and Easy Action. Their second album was recorded at Tar Box Studios in New York and released nationally on February 21, 2006 to positive reviews under The Militia Group record label. During this time, Marko also recorded drums for the Leaving Rouge album "Elsewhere", released by Portland-based record label Greyday Productions on March 21. The Holy Fire's original lineup would eventually disband in the summer of 2006. Marko went on to record and play shows for various projects, including Grammy winner Dave Feeney's American Mars and Ohio's Most Beautiful Losers. Around mid-2016, Marko started collaborating on songs that he had written with his ALP cofounder Darrell Bazian. Marko's project Float Here Forever involved work with Grammy-winning engineer Alan Douches. ESPN recently featured one of ALP's backing instrumental tracks on a 30 second advertisement for "The All-American Cuban Comet" in 2020.

== Reception ==
Marko's drumming has earned him great recognition from various magazines and music critics. In their review of the Holy Fire's album "In The Name of The World", Revolt Media (formerly Running With Scissors Magazine) praised Marko by saying he is "right on point on this song 'Hate Your Smile' as well, serving up a killer rolling drum track at just the right times, keeping the song barreling along, driving it right through the intense conclusion". Furthermore, in reviewing the Holy Fire's self-titled EP, Amplifier Magazine commended Marko by saying he "drives his drums like a rental with 16th notes, his flutter kicks and stop start dynamics pushing the music to great results". Transform Online has called Marko a "money drummer", and lastly, Cloak & Dagger gave Marko's drumming rave reviews, noting "the opening drum beat alone" was enough to catch their interest. The Singer Soldier album "Illusions of Stability", particularly the song 'Bones to Ashes', was lauded by Musings From Boston for its "fragile beauty, delicately floating vocals", as well as the "sparkling of determination". Additionally, Canadian indie music connoisseur website The Revue celebrated the "beautiful punch and eloquent orchestral accompaniment". Real Detroit Weekly hailed the Holy Fire's music, saying "Hands down this EP redefines what a rock band from Detroit should sound like. These guys toss out the garage revival and burn the trashcan with their ability to blend original rock riffs and a dark pop influence".
