= Eternal flame =

Continuously burning fire or lamp

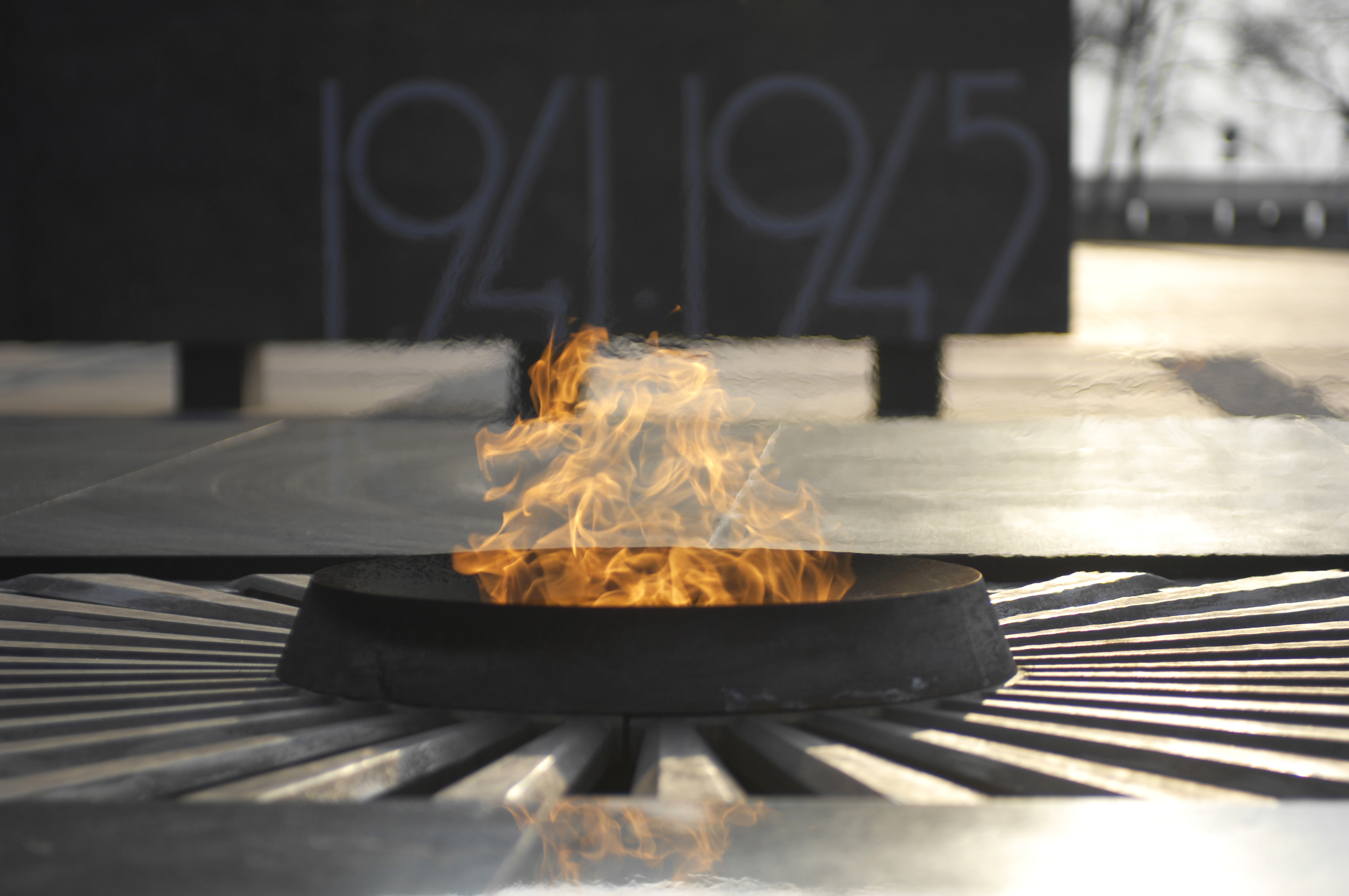
Nizhny Novgorod Kremlin eternal flame memorializing losses during World War II.

An eternal flame is a flame, lamp or torch that burns for an indefinite time. Most eternal flames are ignited and tended intentionally. However, some are natural phenomena caused by natural gas leaks, peat fires and coal seam fires, all of which can be initially ignited by lightning, piezoelectricity or human activity, some of which have burned for hundreds or thousands of years.

In ancient times, eternal flames were fueled by wood or olive oil; modern examples, such as the John F. Kennedy Eternal Flame, typically use a piped supply of natural gas or propane. Human-created eternal flames most often commemorate a person or event of national significance, serve as a symbol of an enduring nature such as a religious belief, or a reminder of commitment to a common goal, such as diplomacy.

== Religious and cultural significance ==
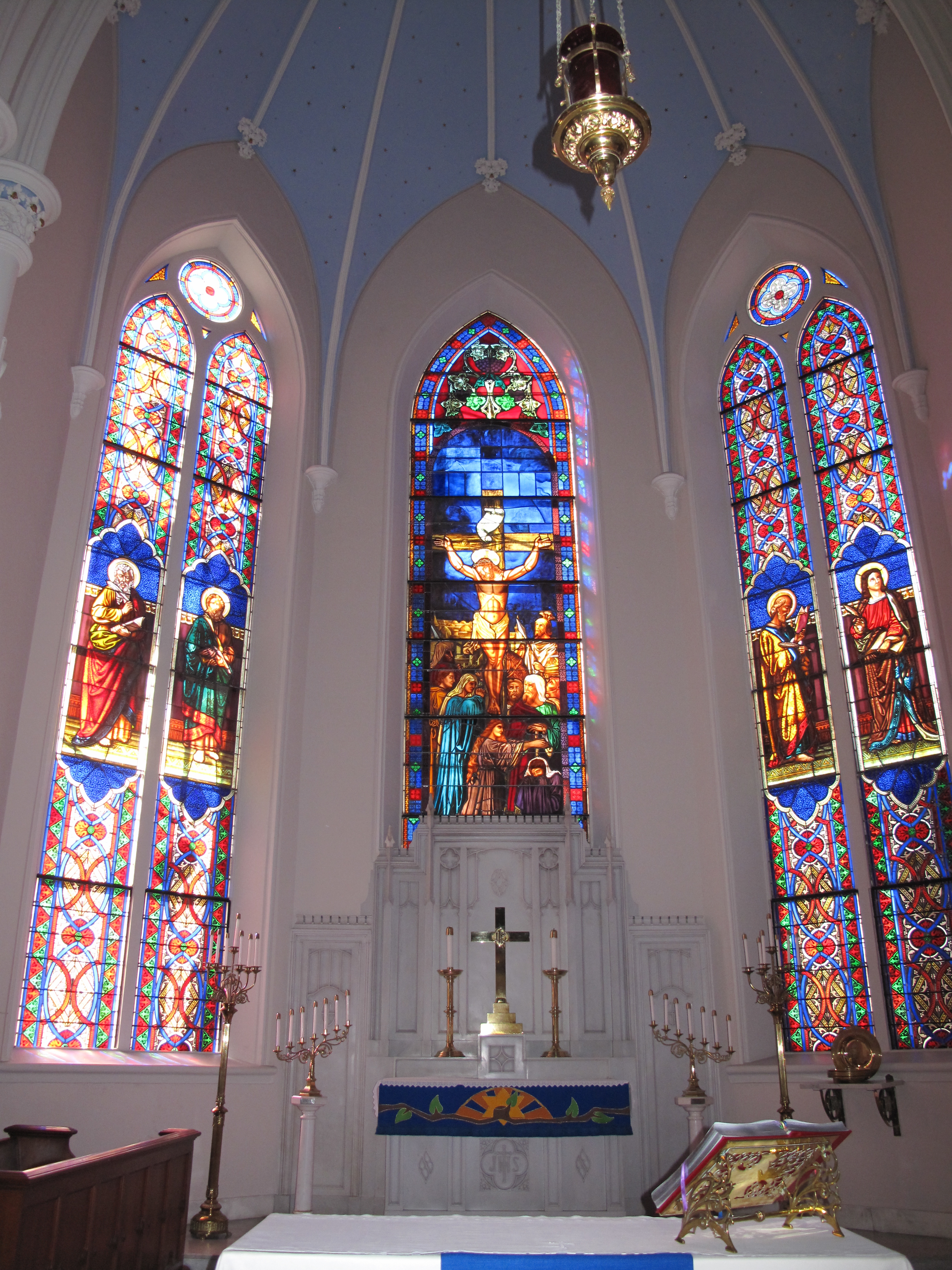
A chancel lamp hangs above the altar of St. Matthew's German Evangelical Lutheran Church

The eternal fire is a long-standing tradition in many cultures and religions. In ancient Iran the atar was tended by a dedicated priest and represented the concept of "divine sparks" or Amesha Spenta, as understood in Zoroastrianism. Period sources indicate that three "great fires" existed in the Achaemenid era of Persian history, which are collectively considered the earliest reference to the practice of creating ever-burning community fires.

The eternal flame was a component of the Jewish religious rituals performed in the Tabernacle and later in the Temple in Jerusalem, where a commandment required a fire to burn continuously upon the Outer Altar. Modern Judaism continues a similar tradition by having a sanctuary lamp, the ner tamid, always lit above the ark in the synagogue. After World War II, such flames gained further meaning, as a reminder of the six million Jews killed in the Holocaust. Judaism has a concept of a נר תמיד or everlasting flame. This is commonly found hanging in front of the Aron Kodesh (holy ark) in orthodox Synagogues. It is meant as a remembrance of the Temple. Occasionally this flame is a fire which is kept lit 24/7. Other times it is merely electric and stays on all the time.

In traditional Christian denominations, such as Catholicism and Lutheranism, an altar lamp continuously burns as an indication of the real presence of Christ in the Eucharist.

The Cherokee Nation maintained a fire at the seat of government until ousted by the Indian Removal Act in 1830. At that time, embers from the last great council fire were carried west to the nation's new home in the Oklahoma Territory. The flame, maintained in Oklahoma, was carried back to the last seat of the Cherokee government at Red Clay State Park in south-eastern Tennessee, to the Museum of the Cherokee People in Cherokee, North Carolina, and to the Cherokee Nation Tribal Complex in Tahlequah, Oklahoma.

In Hindu religious traditions, the maintenance of a continuously burning flame, commonly referred to as an akhand jyoti (unbroken flame), is associated with devotional worship and the enduring presence of the divine. The practice draws upon the religious significance of fire (Agni) in Vedic Hinduism, where fire played a central role in sacrificial rituals and served as the medium through which offerings were conveyed to the gods. In contemporary Hindu worship, lamps are commonly used in puja and aarti, while certain temples maintain continuously burning flames as objects of religious veneration. At the Jwalamukhi Temple in Himachal Pradesh, naturally occurring flames emerging from fissures in the rock are worshipped as manifestations of the goddess Jwalamukhi. At the Badrinath Temple in Uttarakhand, an Akhand Jyoti is traditionally associated with the period of the shrine's winter closure.

In China, it has at times been common to establish an eternally lit lamp as a visible aspect of ancestor veneration; it is set in front of a spirit tablet on the family's ancestral altar.

== Extinguished artificial flames ==
In practice, artificial eternal flames do not burn indefinitely. The realities of infrastructure maintenance, vandalism, ongoing operating costs, weather, and environmental concerns have frequently resulted in the flames being extinguished.

To preserve the continuity of the symbol during necessary maintenance, the physical flame is sometimes transferred to a portable source while the main burner is shut down. Additionally, many modern monuments rely on automated electronic spark igniters to instantly relight the flame if it is accidentally extinguished by severe weather.

=== Permanently extinguished artificial flames ===
- Eternal fire at Nymphaion sanctuary in southern Illyria. Placed around the lower Vjosë/Aoos river near ancient Apollonia and present-day Selenica, Albania, the area was occupied by Illyrians since before archaic colonial times, and the site was likely already a place of worship because of its peculiar physical properties. According to ancient literary accounts the fire of the sanctuary never went out before an ancient war fought between Apollonia and the Illyrians.
- One of the three "Great Flames" of the Achaemenid Empire was extinguished during the reign of Alexander the Great to honour the death of his close friend Hephaestion in 324 BC.
- The Hebrew Bible commands that "The fire shall ever be burning upon the altar; it shall never go out" (Leviticus 6:13, JPS), regarding the altar of Burnt Offering in the Tabernacle, and later the altars in Solomon's Temple and the Second Temple (where the flames were permanently extinguished when the temple was destroyed and sacked by Rome in 70 AD). Many churches (especially Catholic, Anglican, and Lutheran), along with Jewish synagogues, feature an eternal flame on or hung above their altars (churches) or Torah arks (synagogues).
- The Sacred fire of Vesta in Ancient Rome, which burned within the Temple of Vesta on the Roman Forum, was extinguished in 394 AD.
- The sacred fire of the Celtic goddess Brigid burned at Kildare, Ireland in pagan times and the fire was continued when the site was Christianised by Saint Brigid in the 5th century AD. It continued burning until the 16th-century Dissolution of the Monasteries.
- The eternal flame near the Bronze Soldier of Tallinn in Estonia was extinguished after the country gained independence from the USSR in 1991.

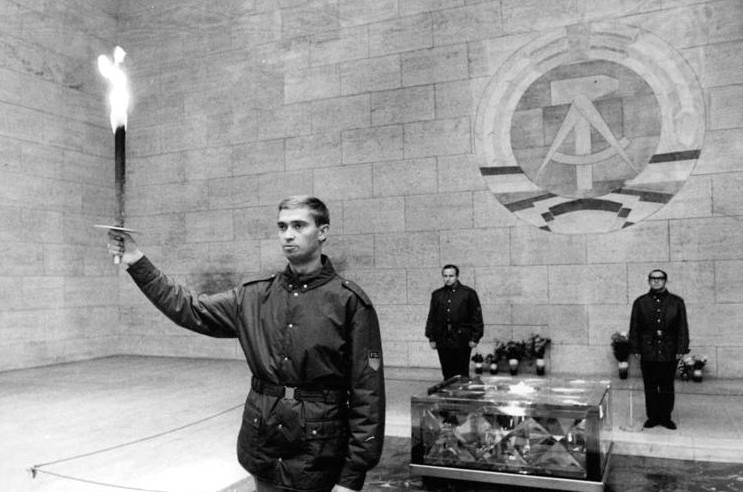
Prismatically broken eternal flame at World War II memorial in East Berlin

- The eternal flame that was part of the East German "Memorial to the Victims of Fascism and Militarism" at the Neue Wache in East Berlin was removed after the 1990 German reunification. In 1993, the space was redesigned without a flame and rededicated as the "Central Memorial of the Federal Republic of Germany for the Victims of War and Tyranny".
- Llama de la Libertad lit by Augusto Pinochet in 1975 in to commemorate the 1973 Chilean coup d'etat against Salvador Allende. It was extinguished in 2004.
- A 23-metre (75 ft) high Eternal flame monument was erected in Belgrade in 2000, to commemorate the victims of 1999 NATO bombing of Yugoslavia. The flame was extinguished just months later, after the overthrow of Slobodan Milošević.
- A lighthouse-like memorial in the suburb of Eira in Helsinki, Finland was originally erected in honour of the Finnish seamen and seafaring. It later became a symbol of those who have perished at the sea, the Baltic Sea in particular. A minor controversy arose when the flame was temporarily extinguished, to conserve gas, technically meaning the flame was not an eternal one. It had been relit but in the middle 2010s, the city of Helsinki grew tired of having to relight the flame and decided to put it out for good.

== Current man-made eternal flames ==
=== Europe ===
==== Belarus ====
- Minsk, at the Victory Square, lit in 1961.
- Baranovichi, at the memorial of the fallen during the Great Patriotic War, lit in 1964.
- Brest, near the ruins of the Engineering Administration, lit in 1972.

==== Belgium ====
- Brussels, at the foot of the Congress Column, surmounting the Tomb of the Unknown Soldier.

==== Bosnia and Herzegovina ====
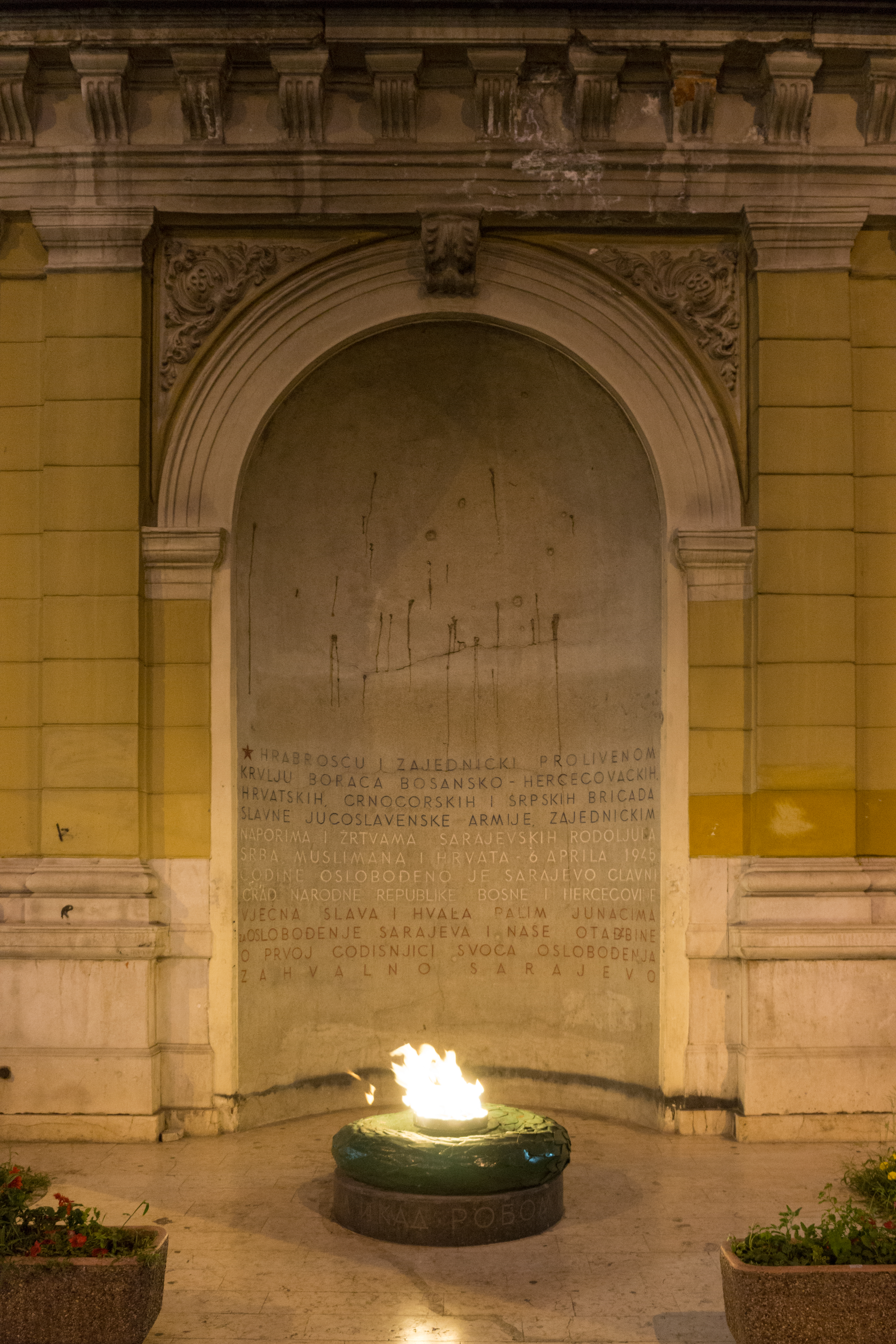
Eternal Flame in Sarajevo

- Sarajevo, the Sarajevo eternal flame (Vječna vatra), in memory of the military and civilian victims of the Second World War.

==== Bulgaria ====
- Sofia, at the Monument to the Unknown Soldier
- Pazardzhik, at the Flower of Eternal Flame

==== Croatia ====
- Zagreb, in front of the Ministry of Internal Affairs in memory of the police officers killed in the Croatian War of Independence
- Sisak, in Dr. Franjo Tuđman Park, in front of the city market and swimming pool, in memory of soldiers fallen in the Croatian War of Independence. It is still active, but has been vandalised and put out several times throughout history.

==== France ====
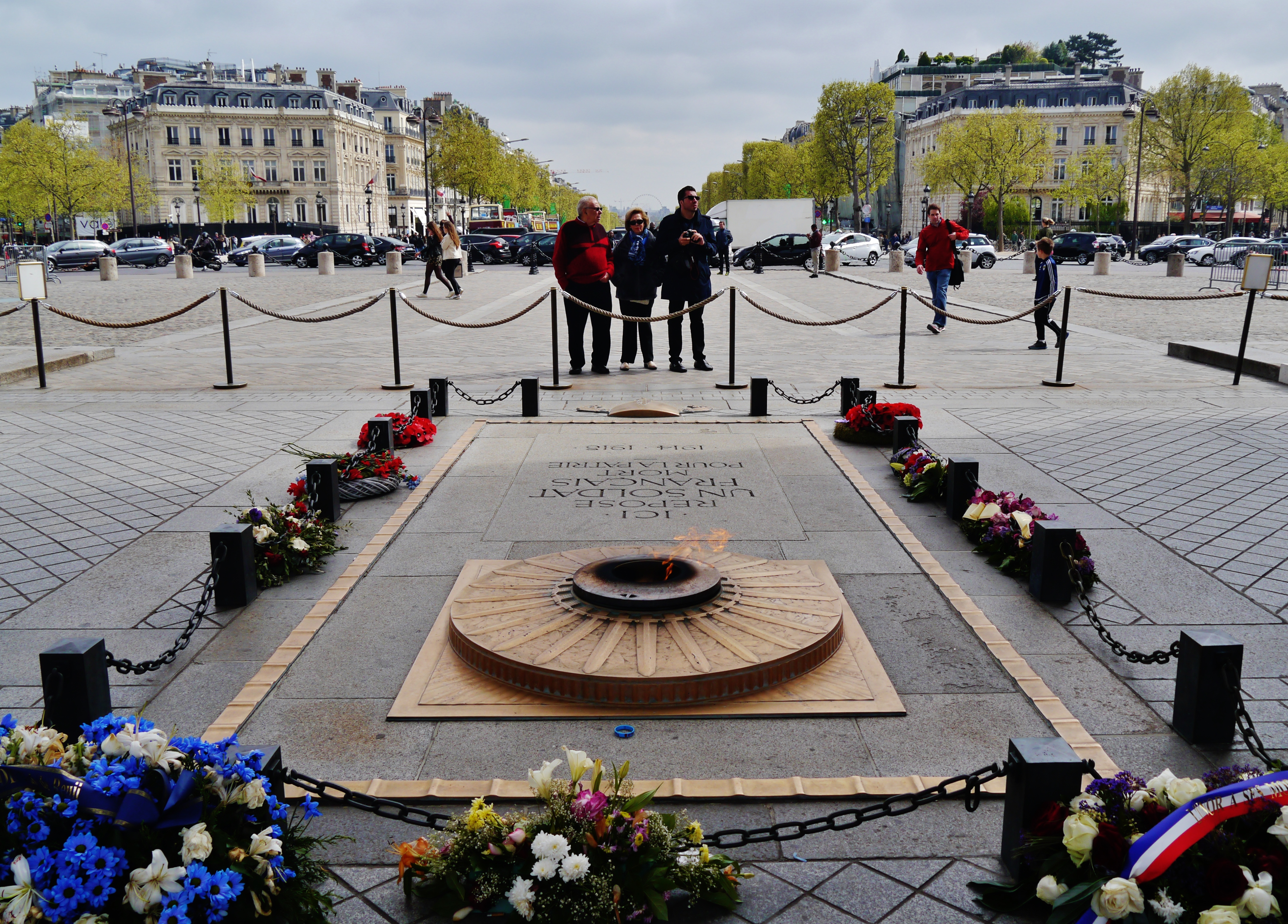
Tomb of the Unknown Soldier with eternal flame beneath the Arc de Triomphe in Paris

- Paris, the Tomb of the Unknown Soldier under the archway at the Arc de Triomphe, which has burned since 1923, and continuously since 1998, in memory of all who died in World War I. It was briefly extinguished during the 1998 World Cup by a drunk tourist.
- Arras, at the Notre Dame de Lorette war memorial.

==== Germany ====
- Berlin, at the Theodor-Heuss-Platz
- Munich, in the Square of the Victims of National Socialism (Platz der Opfer des Nationalsozialismus)

==== Hungary ====
- Budapest, in 2nd district Imre Nagy Square the "Flame Of The Revolution", commemorating the revolutionaries of the 1956 uprising against control by the Soviet Union.
- Budapest, at the corner of Báthory Street and Hold Street burns Batthyány's sanctuary lamp.

==== Ireland ====
- Dublin, at the junction of Amiens St and Memorial Road, the Universal Links on Human Rights by Amnesty International, honouring prisoners of conscience.
- Dublin, at Merrion Square Park, the National Memorial to members of the Defence Forces burns to honour those who have lost their lives in the service of the Irish State.
- Kildare, a perpetual flame burns in the town square. It was formerly housed, since 1993, at Solas Bhríde, a sanctuary run by the Catholic Brigidine sisters. The modern flame rekindles the original one burned by the sisters of Saint Brigit in Kildare, which was extinguished during the Dissolution of the Monasteries.
- New Ross, at a new monument to Irish emigrants. On June 18, 2013, a torch from the eternal flame at the John F. Kennedy grave at Arlington National Cemetery was used to light this flame.

==== Italy ====
- Madonna del Ghisallo, near Lake Como, for all cyclists who have died.
- Rome, on the Altare della Patria, for the Unknown Soldier.

==== Latvia ====
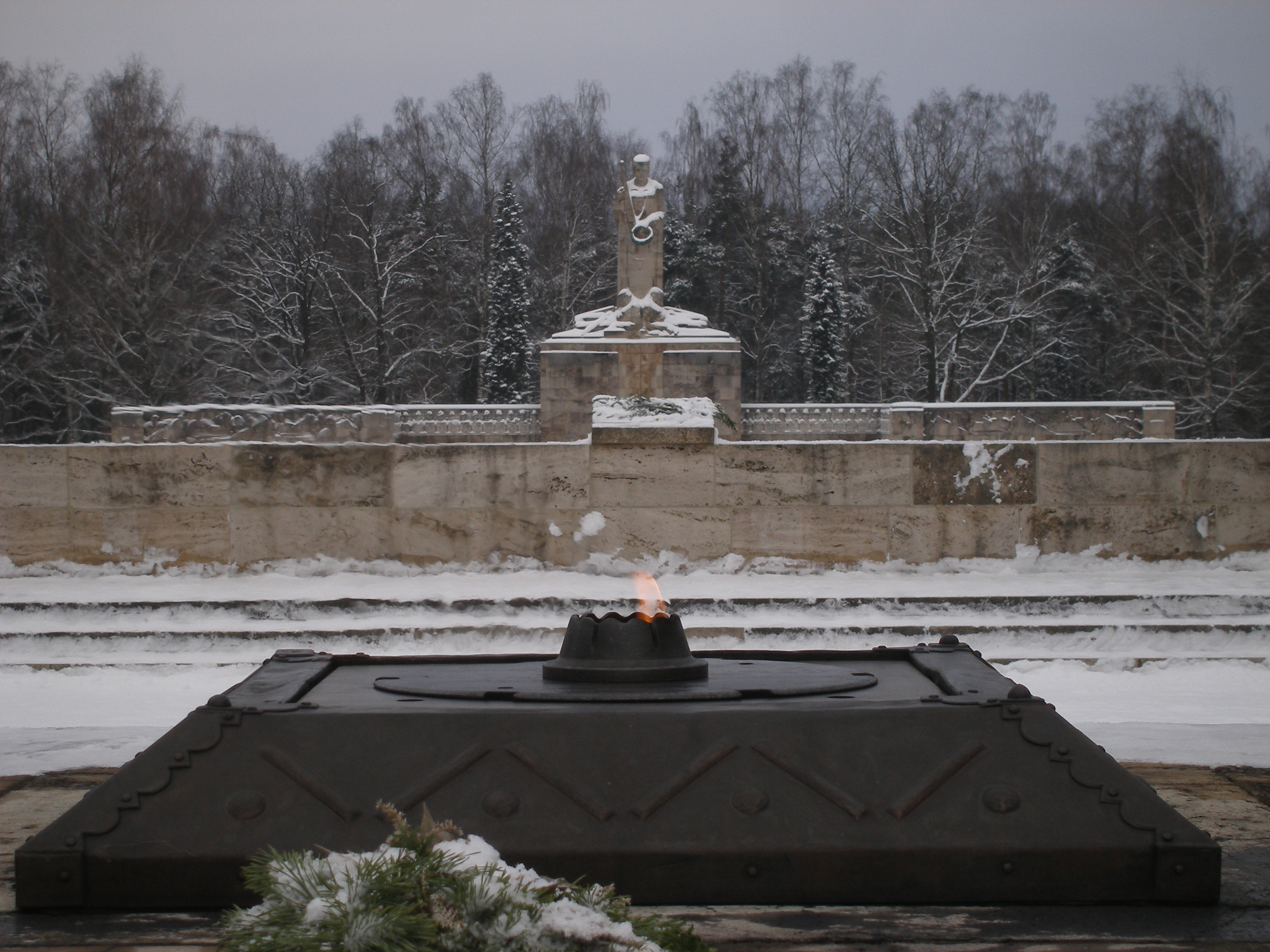
The eternal flame at Brothers' Cemetery, Riga, Latvia

- Riga, at Brothers' Cemetery or Cemetery of the Brethren (Brāļu Kapi), a military cemetery and national monument memorializing thousands of Latvian soldiers who were killed between 1915 and 1920 in World War I and the Latvian War of Independence. The memorial was built between 1924 and 1936, and designed by sculptor Kārlis Zāle.

==== Lithuania ====
- Kaunas, at the Tomb of Unknown Soldier, in the Square of Unity in front of the Vytautas the Great War Museum.

==== Luxembourg ====
- Luxembourg City, near the Place du Saint-Esprit, in memory of all Luxembourgers fallen in World War II.

==== Malta ====
- Floriana, inaugurated in 2012. Two eternal flames are placed beside the War Memorial, dedicated to all the Maltese dead of World War I and World War II.

==== Moldova ====
- Chișinău, a flame dedicated to Chișinău's unknown soldiers who died in World War II at the Eternity Memorial Complex.

==== Netherlands ====
- Amsterdam, at the Hollandsche Schouwburg, in memorial of the Dutch Jewish people who were killed in World War II
- Maastricht, at the Market Square, a statue of Jan Pieter Minckeleers, a Dutch scientist and inventor who discovered illuminating gas (coal gas) and was the inventor of gas lighting.
- The Hague, at the Peace Palace, dedicated to the idea of international peace
- Oosterbeek, at the Airborne Museum Hartenstein, in memorial to those who died in the Battle of Arnhem during Operation Market Garden

==== Norway ====
- Oslo, inaugurated on June 9, 2001 at The Pier of Honour, Port of Oslo by Sri Chinmoy and installed permanently at the Aker Brygge complex in 2002. By 2013 however, it was removed from Aker Brygge and reinstalled at Holmenkollen.

==== Poland ====
- Warsaw, at the Tomb of the Unknown Soldier

==== Portugal ====
- Batalha, at the Tomb of the Unknown Soldier (inside the Batalha Monastery), honoring the Portuguese dead in the World War I, lit April 6, 1921
- Lisbon, at the Monument to the Overseas War Combatants, honoring the dead in the Portuguese Overseas War, lit January 15, 1994

==== Russia ====
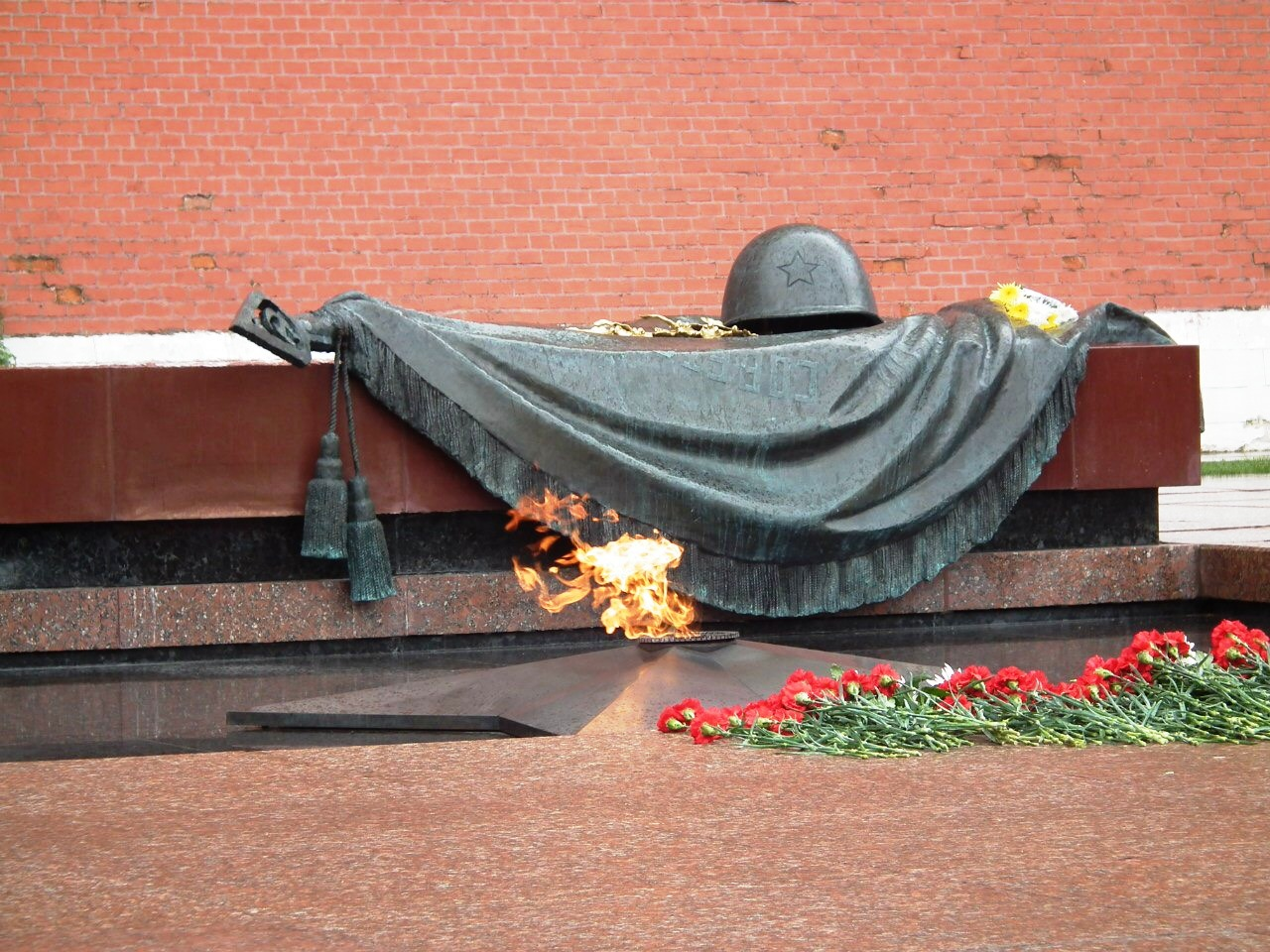
Eternal flame at the Tomb of the Unknown Soldier, Moscow

- Moscow, at the Tomb of the Unknown Soldier in the Alexander Garden to honor the dead of the Great Patriotic War. A second one at Victory Park, also built to honor the dead.
- Saint Petersburg has two main sites with eternal flames. The first is at the Monument to the Fighters of the Revolution, on the Field of Mars, in memory of those who died during the Bolshevik Revolution. The second is at Piskaryovskoye Memorial Cemetery in memory of those who perished in World War II during the Siege of Leningrad. At Victory Square, several flames can be seen at the Monument to the Heroic Defenders of Leningrad, in commemoration of the victims and survivors of the Siege of Leningrad.
- Volgograd has two eternal flames. The first is located at Mamayev Kurgan in the Hall of the Warrior Glory in tribute to all those who died defending the city from 1942 to 1943. The second is located at the Square of the Fallen Fighters on the monument of those who died defending in the Civil and Great Patriotic War
- Kursk has two eternal flames. One is located at the war memorial and the other close to the Triumphal Arch.
- Saratov has two eternal flames: in the Theatre Square and in the Victory Park.
- Tambov
- Novokuznetsk has an eternal flame at the Heroes Boulevard.
- Tolyatti, at the Obelisk of Glory, lit in 1978.
- Samara, at the Obelisk of Glory.
- Tver has an obelisk and an eternal flame nearby, located on Ploschad Pobedy near the confluence of the rivers T'maka and Volga, to honor the Soviet soldiers who fought against Nazi Germany in the Great Patriotic War (ru:Великая Отечественная война).
- Yekaterinburg, on Kommunarov Square, where dead soldiers were buried in a common grave in 1919. An eternal flame was lit at the site in 1959.
- Omsk, an eternal fire was lit in 1967 on Memorial Square, in honour of fallen soldiers in World War II.
- Severodvinsk
- Ufa has two eternal flames. The first was lit in 1967, honouring soldiers, who fell fighting for the Soviet Union. The second was lit in 1980 in Victory Park, honouring Alexander Matrosov and Minnigali Gubaidullin.
- Salavat, opened in 1981. Honors Salavat citizens, who died during the Great Patriotic War.
- Arkhangelsk, in honor of fallen Northerners in 1941–1945
- Sterlitamak
- Biysk
- Bryansk
- Kovrov
- Kolchugino, located on Lenin Square
- Kaspyisk
- Mahachkala
- Kaliningrad
- Petrozavodsk
- Penza has two eternal flames. One at Victory Square, and one next to the palace of nautical sport.
- Anapa
- Sochi
- Novy Urengoy
- Sergiyev Posad
- Vologda
- Tula
- Oryol, an eternal flame was lit in 1967 on Tankman's Square.
- Inozemtsevo
- Murmansk

==== Serbia ====
- Belgrade, the Eternal Flame in the Park of Friendship in Ušće, in memory of the military and civilian victims of the NATO bombing of Yugoslavia.

==== Spain ====
- Barcelona, Catalonia, at the Fossar de les Moreres (adjacent to the Basílica de Santa Maria del Mar), honouring the Catalans buried there, who died defending Barcelona from those loyal to Philip V on the siege of 1714. The torch with the eternal flame was inaugurated in 2001.
- Madrid, at the Plaza de la Lealtad. The Monumento a los Caídos por España honours all those who have died fighting for Spain. It was Originally built in 1840 to honour those who fought against Napoleonic forces during the Peninsular War (1808-1814) but had Additions made in 1985 and the eternal flame was introduced alongside the monument. Following the COVID-19 pandemic, the Mayor of Madrid inaugurated on 15 May another eternal flame at Plaza de Cibeles, in memory of those who died during the pandemic.

==== Switzerland ====
- Näfels, at the St. Hilarius Parish Church, in atonement for a 14th-century murder.

==== Transnistria ====
- Tiraspol, a flame dedicated to losses of the War of Transnistria.

==== Ukraine ====
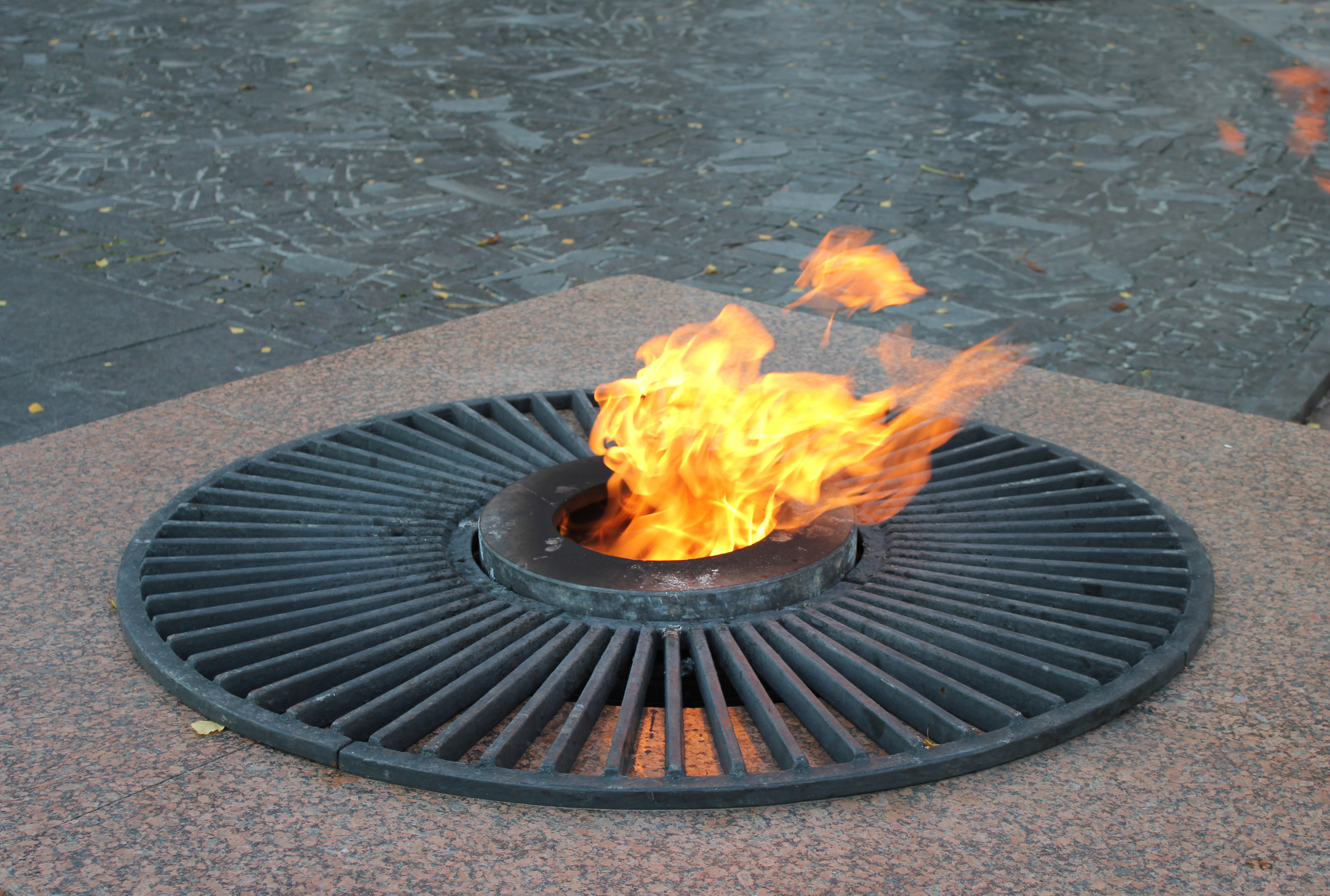
Eternal Flame in Vinnytsia

- Kyiv, in the Glory Park at the Glory Obelisk and the Tomb of the Unknown Soldier, honoring the dead of World War II.
- Chernihiv, in the Glory Memorial in Boldyni Hills.
- Vinnytsia, the Glory memorial.
- Odesa, a monument to the unknown sailor.

==== United Kingdom ====
- London, at the New Scotland Yard. The flame commemorates, as the inscription notes, "those who have lost their lives in the service of the Metropolitan Police".
- Liverpool, at the Anfield stadium, in memorial to those who died in the Hillsborough disaster.
- The 'Peace flame' in Derry, at the 'Peace Garden', to symbolise the renewed hope and peace created in the city in the post-Troubles era. Opened in 2013 by Martin Luther King III. The flame was extinguished during 2017-2018 by a group of vandals. The flame has since been re-lit.

=== North America ===
==== Canada ====
- The Flame of Hope in London, Ontario, at 442 Adelaide Street, where Frederick Banting did theoretical work leading to the discovery of human insulin. It will remain lit until diabetes is cured. It was lit by Queen Elizabeth The Queen Mother in 1989.
- The Centennial Flame in Ottawa, Ontario, first lit in 1967, is in the spirit of an eternal flame; however, it is annually extinguished for cleaning and then relit. It commemorates the first hundred years of Canadian Confederation.
- The Centennial Flame on the grounds of the Alberta Legislature Building in Edmonton, Alberta commemorates the same milestone as its counterpart in Ottawa. The flame burns from a metallic cauldron and is located south along the walkway from the south entrance of the Legislature between the south side of Legislature Building Road NW and Fortway Drive NW. Another eternal flame is located on the grounds of the Legislature honours those fallen in the line of duty working for the province.
- The Eternal Flame in the Peace Garden in Nathan Phillips Square in front of Toronto City Hall. It was lit by Pope John Paul II in September 1984 and symbolizes the hope and regeneration of humanity.
- The Eternal Flame of Hope, tribute to disabled people on Pecaut Square in Toronto.

==== United States ====
- Alabama: Huntsville in honor of those who made great sacrifices to serve their country.
- California: Koyasan Buddhist Temple in Los Angeles, where the Peace Flame directly taken from the torch at the Hiroshima Peace Memorial Park in Japan is kept. The flame was brought to Los Angeles in 1989 by Mayor Tom Bradley and has been maintained by the resident priests ever since. University of California, Santa Barbara, houses an eternal flame on its campus in honor of Dr. Martin Luther King, Jr. Auburn, on the corner of Fulweiler St. and Nevada St. depicts a soldier carrying a fallen comrade. The statue is named "Why". Redlands, in Jennie Davis Park (corner of Redlands Blvd. and New York St.), at the Veterans' Memorial. La Mirada, in front of City Hall to honor the residents who have given their life for their country. Pico Rivera, in front of the civic center, to honor Pico Rivera veterans who died in the line of duty.
- Connecticut: New Britain, at the National Iwo Jima Memorial to honor the memory of US servicemen who gave their lives at Iwo Jima.
- Florida: Jacksonville, at the Veterans Memorial Wall there is an eternal flame to honor those who served. Miami, at Bayfront Park on Biscayne Boulevard, is the Torch of Friendship for John F. Kennedy
- Georgia: Decatur, at the square downtown, for the Korean War, World War II, and the Vietnam War; Macon, at the City Hall building, to honor Macon-born war veterans; Monroe, at the Monroe Historic Courthouse, to honor Walton County veterans; Savannah at the Chatham County Courthouse dedicated to the "Glory of God" and honors veterans, specifically Captain Willie O. Sasser, U.S. Air Force; Atlanta, at the King Center, for assassinated civil rights leader Martin Luther King Jr.
- Hawaii: Honolulu, to honor victims of the September 11 attacks.
- Illinois: Chicago, at Daley Plaza, to honor those who perished in World War II, ignited August 22, 1972, by Albina Nance, president of the Illinois Gold Star Mothers. Highland Park, in the Freedom's Sacrifice veterans memorial located on the corner of St. John Ave and Central Avenue to remember the soldiers from Highland Park that gave their lives in the name of freedom. Naperville, on the city's Riverwalk to honor victims of September 11 attacks. Loves Park, in Holdridge Park on North Second Street to honor all veterans.

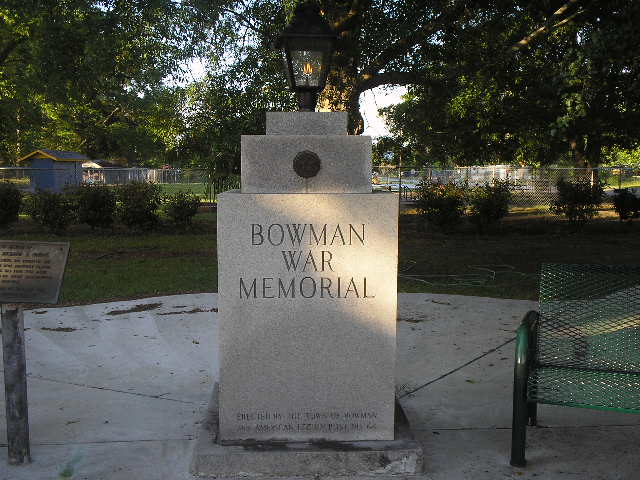
Eternal flame war memorial in Bowman, South Carolina

- Indiana: Highland, the Highland-Wicker Park Veterans Memorial in Wicker Park on Indianapolis Boulevard and Ridge Road, erected to honor all veterans.
- Louisiana: Saint Martinville, at the Acadian Memorial, symbolizing the survival of exiled Acadians as south Louisiana Cajuns.
- Maryland: Emmitsburg, at the National Fallen Firefighters Memorial, on the grounds of the National Fire Academy
- Massachusetts: Springfield, at Forest Park, John F. Kennedy Memorial Flame to honor the memory of President Kennedy. The flame was lit November 22, 1964 on the first anniversary of his death.
- Michigan: Farmington Hills, at the Holocaust Memorial Center in honor of those who perished during the Holocaust. Flint, in Downtown Flint, across from the Durant Hotel, to honor John F. Kennedy. Grand Haven, at the Veterans memorial plaza to honor American veterans of all wars.
- Mississippi: Mississippi State University, the eternal flame of education
- Missouri: Downtown, Saint Louis, to commemorate the founding of the American Legion in 1919 by Theodore Roosevelt Jr.
- Nevada: Las Vegas, at the Allegiant Stadium and Las Vegas Raiders headquarters in Henderson to honor the late Oakland Raiders owner Al Davis.
- New Mexico: Santa Fe, on South Capitol Plaza next to the Bataan Memorial Building, honoring the men of the 200th Coast Artillery of the National Guard who died on the Bataan Death March
- New York: New York City, at Ground Zero, lit by Mayor Michael Bloomberg on the first anniversary of the September 11 attacks upon the financial district of the city; St. Clare's Church, honoring 29 parishioners who died during the September 11 attacks. Lewiston Veteran's Circle of Honor Memorial, that reads, "America's flame burns brightly, fueled by the courage and sacrifice of those who have defended our freedoms."
- North Dakota: Grand Forks, at the University of North Dakota, Old Main Memorial Sphere erected on the site where the university's first building once stood.
- Ohio: Cincinnati at the National Underground Railroad Freedom Center Represents the candles that were placed in the windows of Underground Railroad Supporters. Canton, Garden Center, incorporated into the city's memorial to the memory of President John F. Kennedy, dedicated in 1966. Steubenville, at the Tomb of the Unborn Child, the gravesite of seven aborted fetuses, on the campus of the Franciscan University of Steubenville. Columbus, at Battelle Riverfront Park, to honor fallen members of the Columbus Fire Department. Clinton, at Ohio Veterans Memorial Park. The monument is made up of a large sitting area that is surrounded by benches, a four tier waterfall, a fifty foot wide pond, a black granite POW/MIA monument, an inverted Vietnam War helmet with the eternal flame and a cast steel POW/MIA seal. Mount Vernon, on the campus of Mount Vernon Nazarene University to honor the commitment to learning and the expansion of knowledge; Eastlake, eternal flame located at the boulevard of 500 flags in honor of all those who lost their lives in the 9/11 attacks. Sits beside a piece of steel beam from the World Trade Towers.
- Oklahoma: Oral Roberts University, Tulsa, atop the Prayer Tower, which represents the baptism of the Holy Spirit.
- Pennsylvania: Gettysburg Battlefield, in memory of the dead of the American Civil War, first lit by President Franklin Roosevelt in 1938; Shanksville, to honor the crew and passengers aboard United Airlines Flight 93 on September 11 attacks in their efforts to thwart the hijacking; Johnstown, to memorialize those lost in the 1889 flood; Washington Square, Philadelphia, site of the city's Tomb of the Unknown Soldier of the American Revolution and above the mass grave of thousands of Revolutionary War soldiers, however the flame has been extinguished at times for years due to poor maintenance.
- South Carolina: Bowman, lit in 1987 in honor and memory of the community's residents who died in World War I, World War II, and the Vietnam War.
- Tennessee: The Cherokee maintained a fire at their seat of government, and carried coals to the Oklahoma Territory. Coals from that fire were used to relight the eternal flame at Red Clay State Park, the last seat of the independent Cherokee Nation. The Cherokee People Eternal Flame, located on the Qualla Boundary in Cherokee, North Carolina, is another example of a flame first lit on the Oklahoma Cherokee Reservation and carried as hot coals back to the homeland. Memphis, at the grave of Elvis Presley at his home Graceland.
- Virginia: John F. Kennedy Eternal Flame in Arlington National Cemetery, lit by Jacqueline Kennedy on November 25, 1963, during the assassinated president's state funeral; Newport News Victory Arch, commemorating American servicemen and women.; Huntington Park (Newport News) Vietnam Veterans War Memorial dedicated in 1992; Lynchburg, gravesite of Jerry Falwell at Liberty University.
- Washington, D.C.: at the United States Holocaust Memorial Museum, first lit in 1993 by President Bill Clinton and noted Holocaust survivor Elie Wiesel.

==== Mexico ====
- The Column of Independence, México City in memory of the heroes of the Mexican Independence War.

==== Nicaragua ====
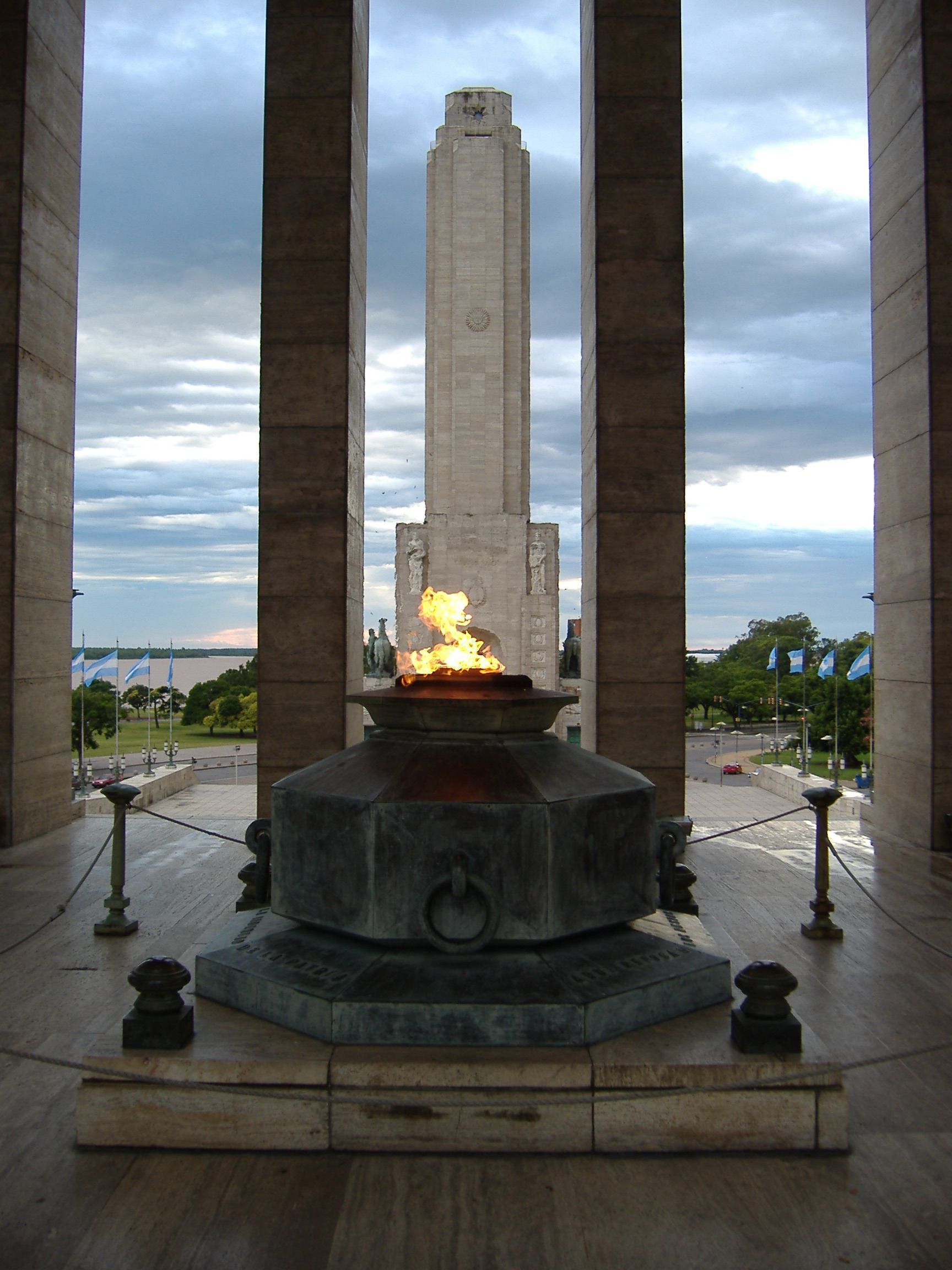
National Flag Memorial in Rosario, Argentina

- Tomb of Carlos Fonseca in the Central Park of Managua.

=== South America ===
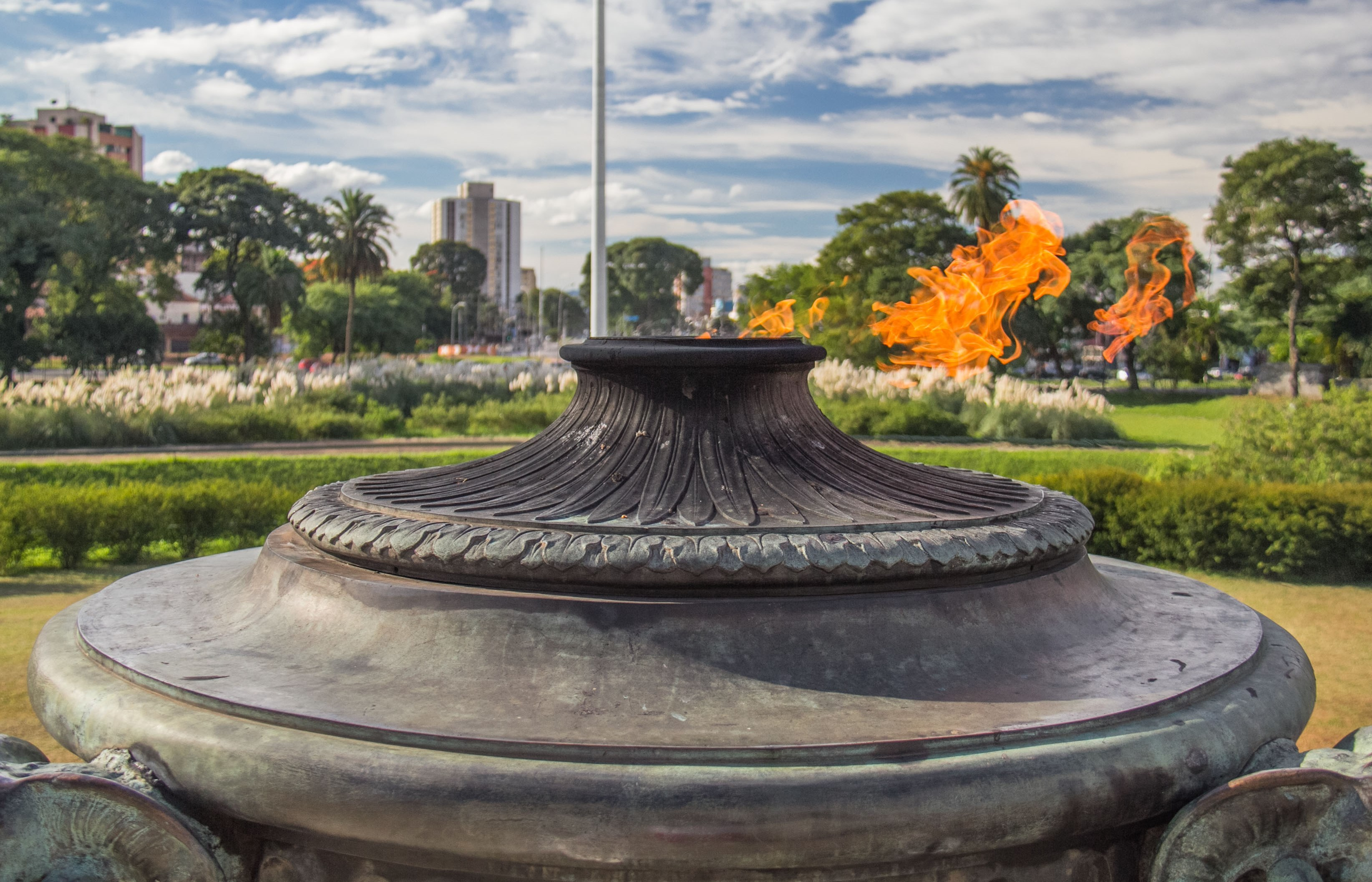
The Pira da Liberdade, Brazilian eternal flame, in São Paulo

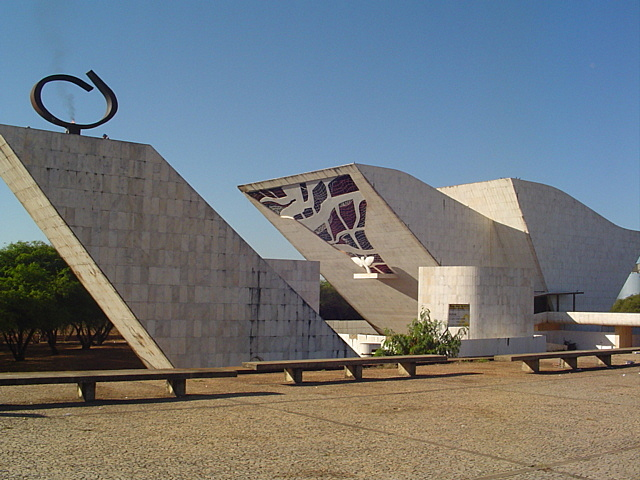
The Pantheon of Fatherland and Freedom, Tancredo Neves, in Brasília

==== Argentina ====
- In the Buenos Aires Metropolitan Cathedral in the Autonomous City of Buenos Aires. It was lit on August 17, 1947 to honor the tomb of General José de San Martín, whose remains rest inside it; and the soldiers who fought and perished in the wars for Argentina, Chile and Perú's independence from the Spanish crown.
- In the National Flag Memorial (Argentina) in Rosario, Santa Fe.
- In the 'Monument to the dead of the Malvinas War' (Caidos en Malvinas) in Mar del Plata, Buenos Aires.

==== Brazil ====
- In the Independence Park, São Paulo, the Pira da Liberdade marks the site of the independence of Brazil
- Outside the Pantheon of Fatherland and Freedom, Tancredo Neves, Brasília, on top of a tower built on the diagonal, burns an eternal flame which represents the freedom of the people and the country's independence.
- In São Sepé, central region of the state of Rio Grande do Sul, Boqueirão Ranch has a shed that houses a fire that has been lit since the shed was built in 1800. The Simões Pires family, in its sixth generation, currently maintains the bonfire still lit today.

==== Chile ====
- The Llama de la Libertad, which commemorated the 1973 Chilean coup d'état. It was extinguished in 2004 due to budget cuts.
- In Punta Arenas, to commemorate the heroes of the Battle of La Concepción. It was extinguished in 2013 due to natural gas shortages.

==== Colombia ====
- In the Battle of Boyacá Memorial in Boyacá.

==== Venezuela ====
- In the Battle of Carabobo Memorial in Carabobo.

=== Australia and New Zealand ===
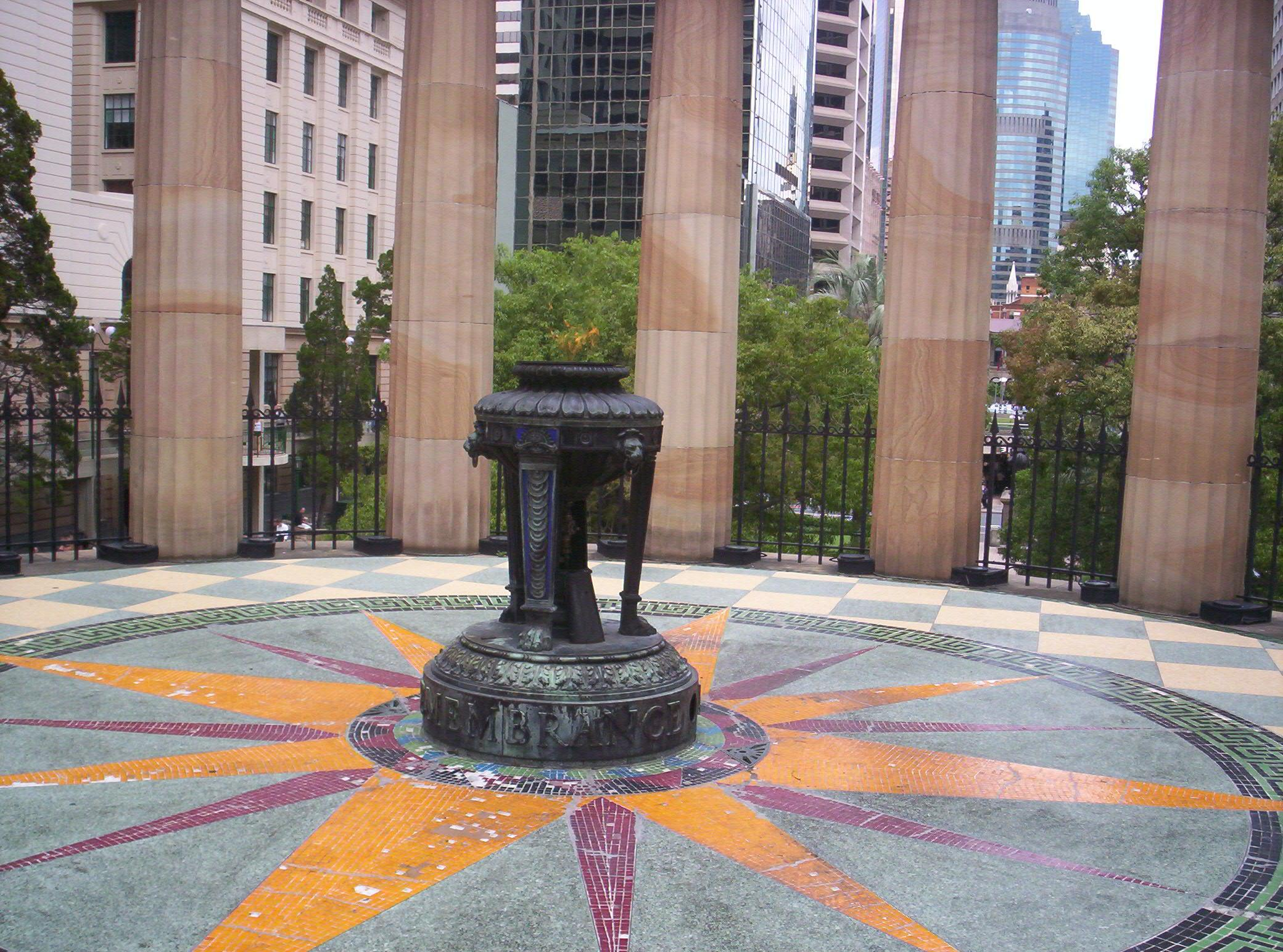
Eternal flame at the Shrine of Remembrance, Brisbane, Queensland, Australia

- In the ANZAC War Memorial, Hyde Park in Sydney.
- In the Shrine of Remembrance in Melbourne.
- In the Shrine of Remembrance in ANZAC Square in Brisbane, Queensland.
- At the Australian War Memorial, Canberra, Australian Capital Territory.
- At the state War Memorial in Kings Park, Western Australia.
- In the Carillon War Memorial located at Bathurst, New South Wales.
- At the Anzac Memorial, ANZAC Park, Townsville.
- At the Napier War Memorial Centre in Napier, New Zealand.

=== Asia ===
==== Armenia ====
- Yerevan, in the center of the Armenian Genocide Memorial. Memorializing the loss of at least 1.5 million Armenians during the Armenian genocide in 1915.

==== Azerbaijan ====
- Baku, at the Martyrs' Lane in memory of the military and civilian victims of the Black January.
- Ateshgah of Baku.

==== Bangladesh ====
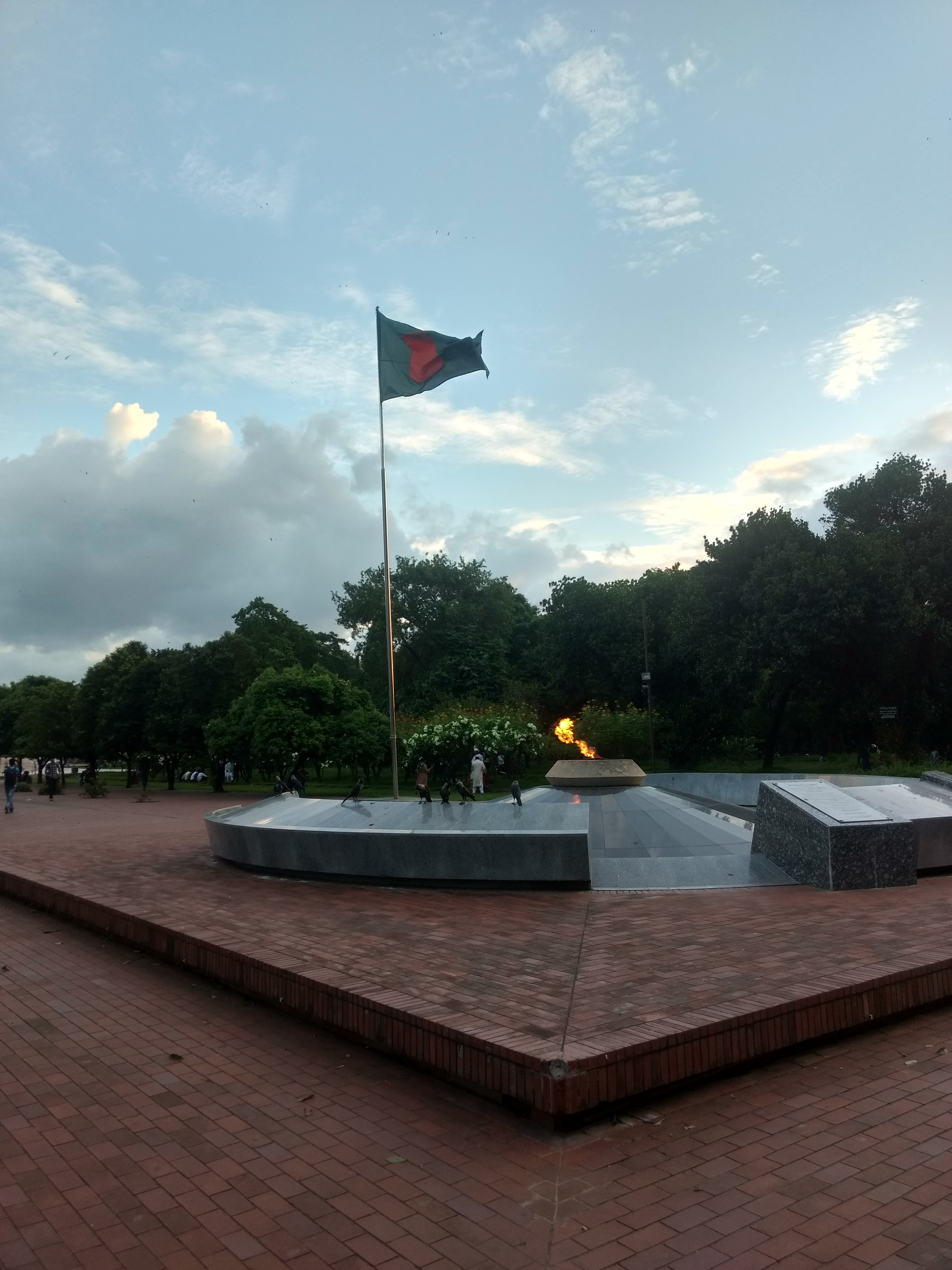
Eternal Flame (Shikha Chironton)

- Dhaka, at the Suhrawardy Udyan the Shikha Chironton (Eternal Flame) located besides Swadhinata Stambha commentating the martyrs of the Bangladesh Liberation War and the precise location of the signing of the Instrument of Surrender.
- Chittagong, at Chandranath Temple.

==== China ====
- China Millennium Monument, symbolizing the continuity of human experience in China since times immemorial.

==== Georgia ====
- Tbilisi, at the roundabout and underpass of Hero's Square.

==== India ====
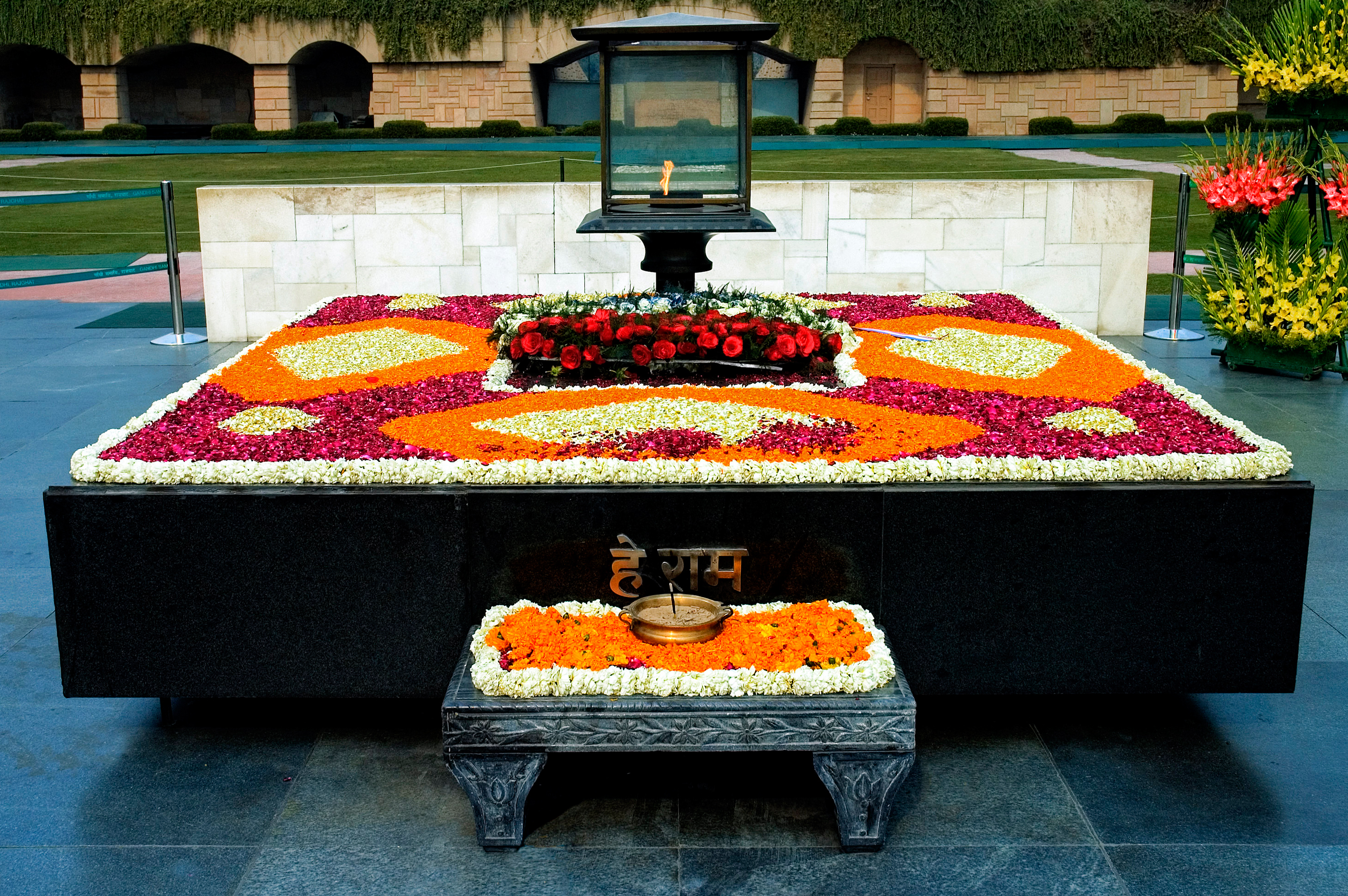
Raj Ghat, Delhi

- Raj Ghat, New Delhi, Delhi, in memory of Mahatma Gandhi at the site of his cremation. The date that the flame was first lit is unknown.
- Amar Jawan Jyoti, New Delhi, at the India Gate, first lit in 1971 to honor 90,000 soldiers who died in World War I and later conflicts. On 21 January 2022, the eternal flame was merged with an eternal flame at the National War Memorial.
- Kargil War Memorial, Dras, Ladakh, the eternal flame was lit to commemorate the Indian victory in the 1999 Kargil War and to pay homage to martyrs.
- Port Blair, Andaman and Nicobar Islands, to remember the victims of the 2004 Asian tsunami, unveiled in 2005.
- Dwarka Mai Mosque, Shirdi, Maharashtra, lit by Sai Baba of Shirdi in the late 1800s.
- Some ancient temples in India are known to have eternal flames which have burnt for centuries. Most established temples (such as Venkateswara Temple, Mantralayam, Jawalamukhi, Jwala Ji etc.) have eternal flames.

==== Indonesia ====
- Api Abadi Mrapen (Mrapen Eternal Fire), Grobogan, Central Java. It was used as a torch flame source for the 1st GANEFO. It died out on the 25th of September 2020, possibly as a result of nearby mining activity.
- Api Abadi Sungai Siring (Siring River Eternal Fire), Samarinda, East Borneo.

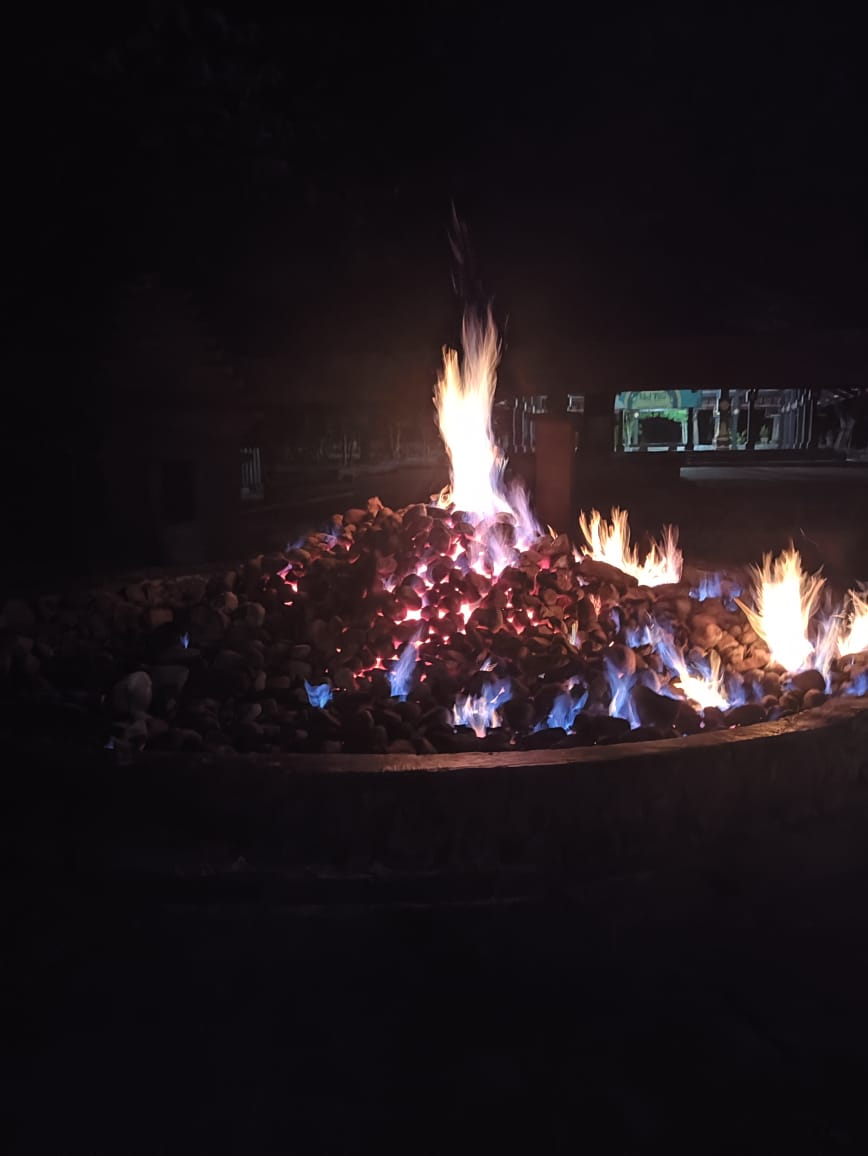
Kayangan Api, an eternal flame in the middle of teak forest in Bojonegoro

- Api Abadi Kayangan Api (Kayangan Api Eternal Fire), Bojonegoro, East Java. This site has had an eternal flame since the era of the Majapahit.
- Api Abadi Bekucuk (Bekucuk Eternal Fire), East Java.
- Api Tak Kunjung Padam, Pamekasan Regency, Madura.
- Tugu Api Semangat Indonesia Tidak Pernah Padam (Monument of the Undying Spirit of Indonesia), at Jenderal Soedirman Building, Ministry of Defense (Indonesia), Central Jakarta, Jakarta.

==== Iran ====
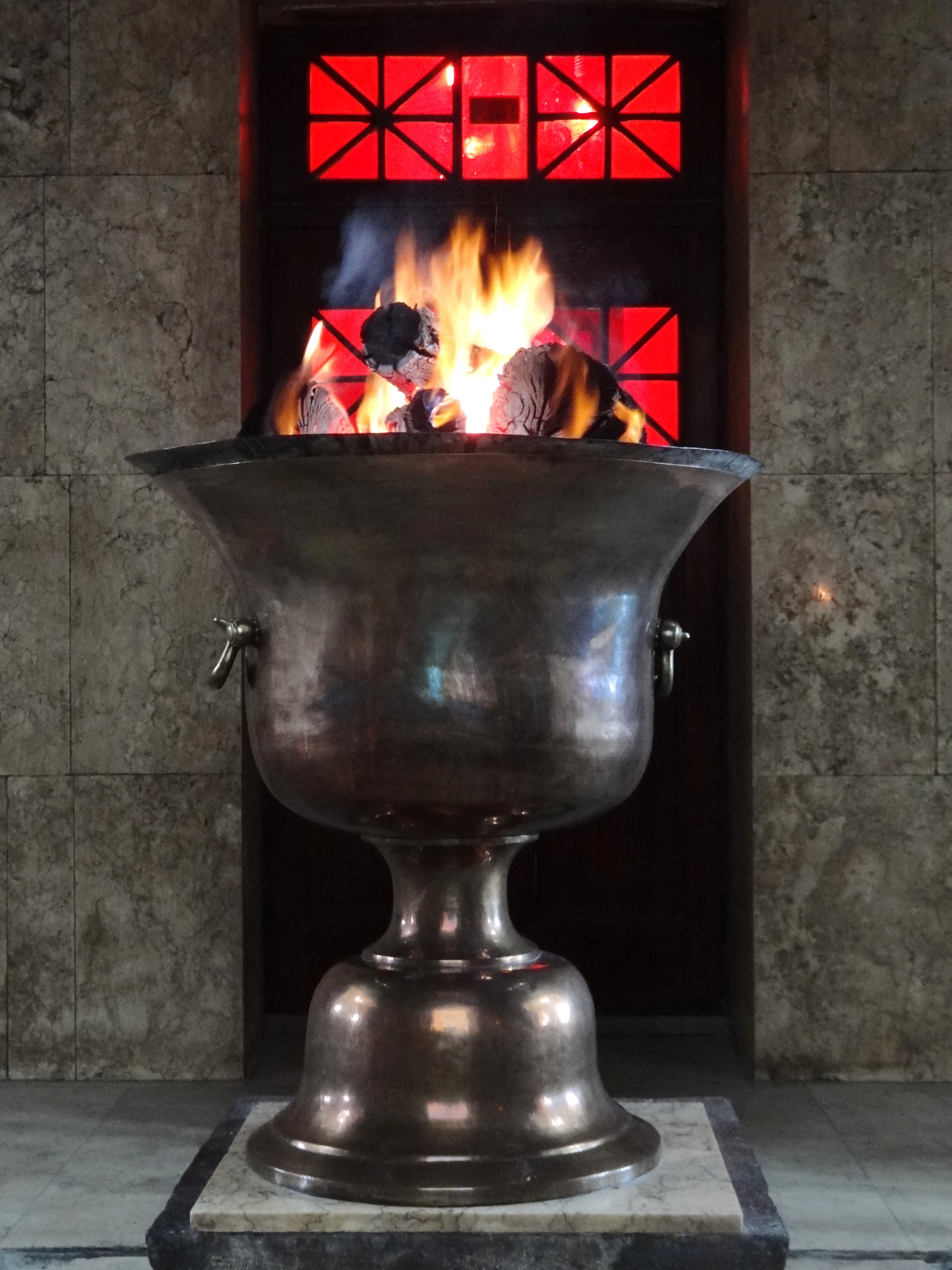
Zoroastrian Eternal Flame at the Fire Temple in Yazd, Central Iran

- Yazd Atash Behram, Yazd, a Zoroastrian fire temple.

==== Israel ====
- Tel Aviv, at Rabin Square, for assassinated Prime Minister Yitzhak Rabin
- In Jerusalem at Yad Vashem, the national Holocaust-Memorial of Israel
- Near Jerusalem at Yad Kennedy, Israel's memorial to U.S. President John F. Kennedy.

==== Japan ====
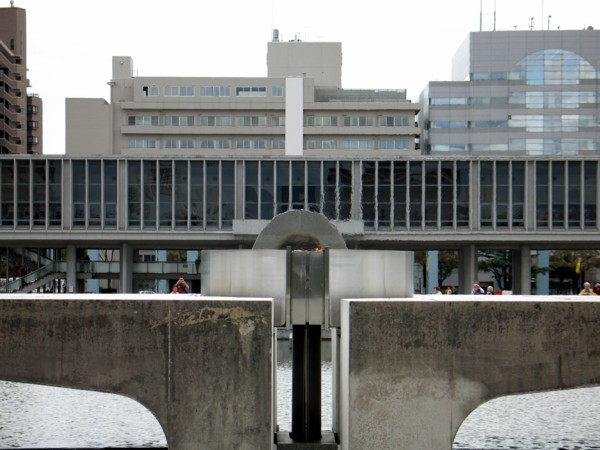
Peace Flame at the Peace Memorial Museum in Hiroshima, Japan

- Hiroshima Peace Memorial Park, The remaining fire from the atomic bomb explosion that was dropped by the US. remains burning since 1945. It is now a symbol of peace and to remain lit until all nuclear weapons in the world are abolished.
- At the Buddhist temple Daishō-in, at Mount Misen, Itsukushima, where the flame is said to have been burning since AD 806, for more than 1,200 years. The Sacred Fire Hall of the temple was completely burned in a fire at around 8:30 a.m. Japan Standard Time on 20 May 2026 (23:30 p.m. UTC, 19 May). The flame itself was not extinguished, it was salvaged and moved to a different site.

==== Kazakhstan ====
- Almaty, the Monument to the Unknown Soldier in Panfilov Park.

==== Kyrgyzstan ====
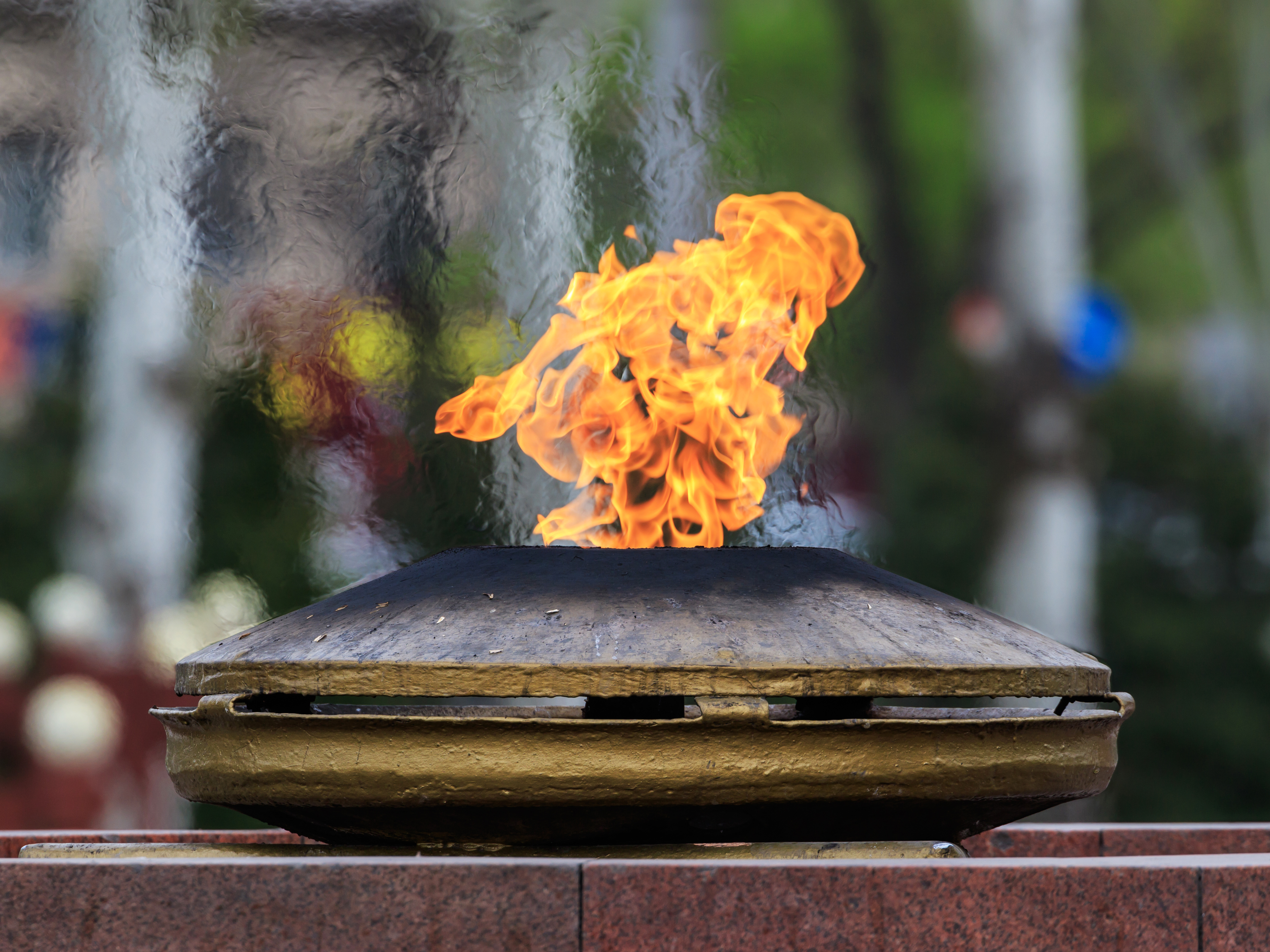
Bishkek eternal flame

- Bishkek, the Victory (Pobedy) Monument on Victory Square.

==== Nepal ====
- Eternal Peace Flame Lumbini, birthplace of Gautama Buddha, since 1986.

==== Philippines ====
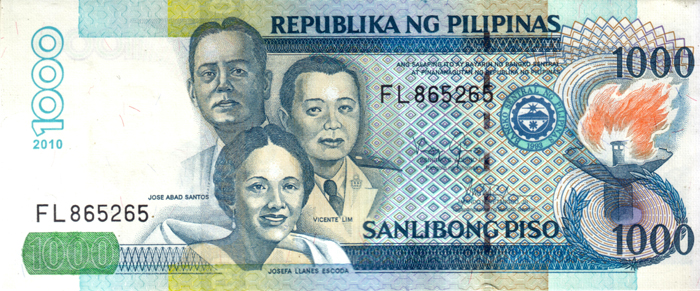
An eternal flame is featured on the New Design/BSP series Philippine 1000-peso bill.

- Eternal Flame of Freedom in Corregidor.
- Eternal Flame on the grave of former president Ferdinand Marcos in the Libingan ng mga Bayani in Taguig City.

==== South Korea ====
- At the Peace Gate at Olympic Park, Seoul, South Korea.

==== Turkmenistan ====
- Türkmenbaşy, the Victory Monument.

=== Africa ===
==== Kenya ====
- Nairobi, Kenya: The Eternal Flame of Uhuru Gardens.

==== Ghana ====
- Accra, Ghana: The Eternal Flame of African Liberation.

==== Zimbabwe ====
- Harare, Zimbabwe: An eternal flame burns atop the Kopje to commemorate independence.

==== South Africa ====
- Pretoria, South Africa: An eternal flame burns in the Voortrekker Monument, since 1938.
- Johannesburg, South Africa: The flame of democracy burns on Constitution Hill, since 2011.
- Cape Town, South Africa: The Flame of Remembrance for the fallen soldiers and heroes of the struggle burns at the Parliament.

=== Caribbean ===
==== Trinidad and Tobago ====
- Port of Spain: At The Red House, in memory of the lives lost in the 1990 attempted coup.

==== Cuba ====
- Havana: Memorial to the Soviet Internationalist Soldier.
- Havana: Museum of the Revolution in the Granma complex.
- Santa Clara: Inside the Che Guevara Mausoleum.
- Santa Clara: In the cemetery beside the Che Guevara Mausoleum complex.

== Naturally fueled flames ==
=== Fueled by natural gas ===
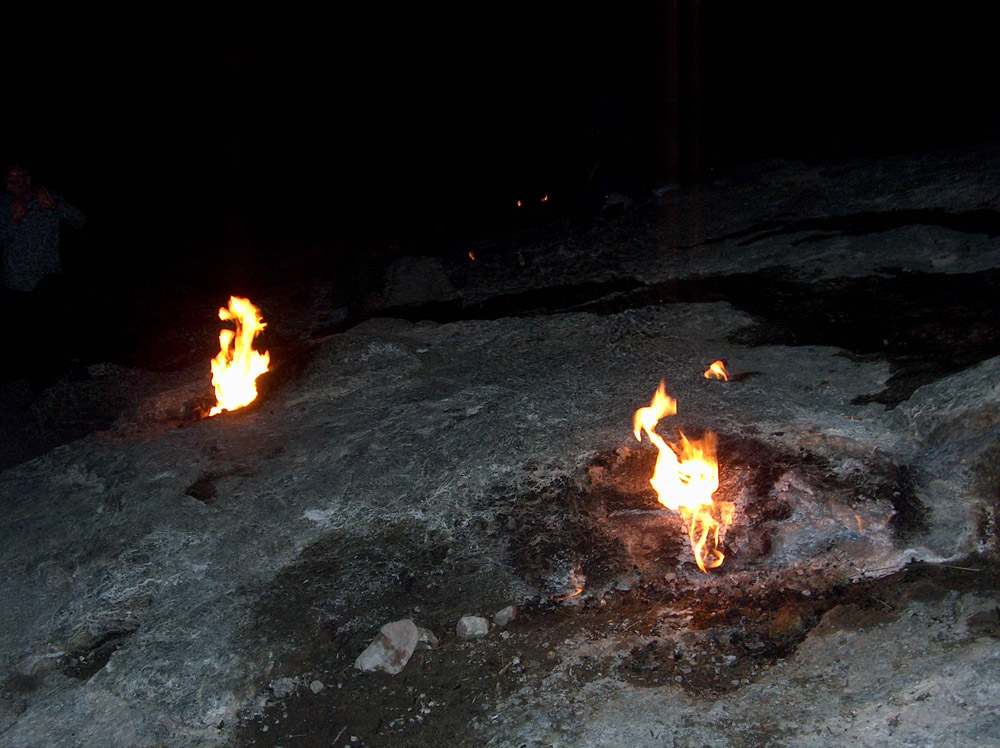
Fires of Chimera at Yanartaş, Çıralı, Turkey

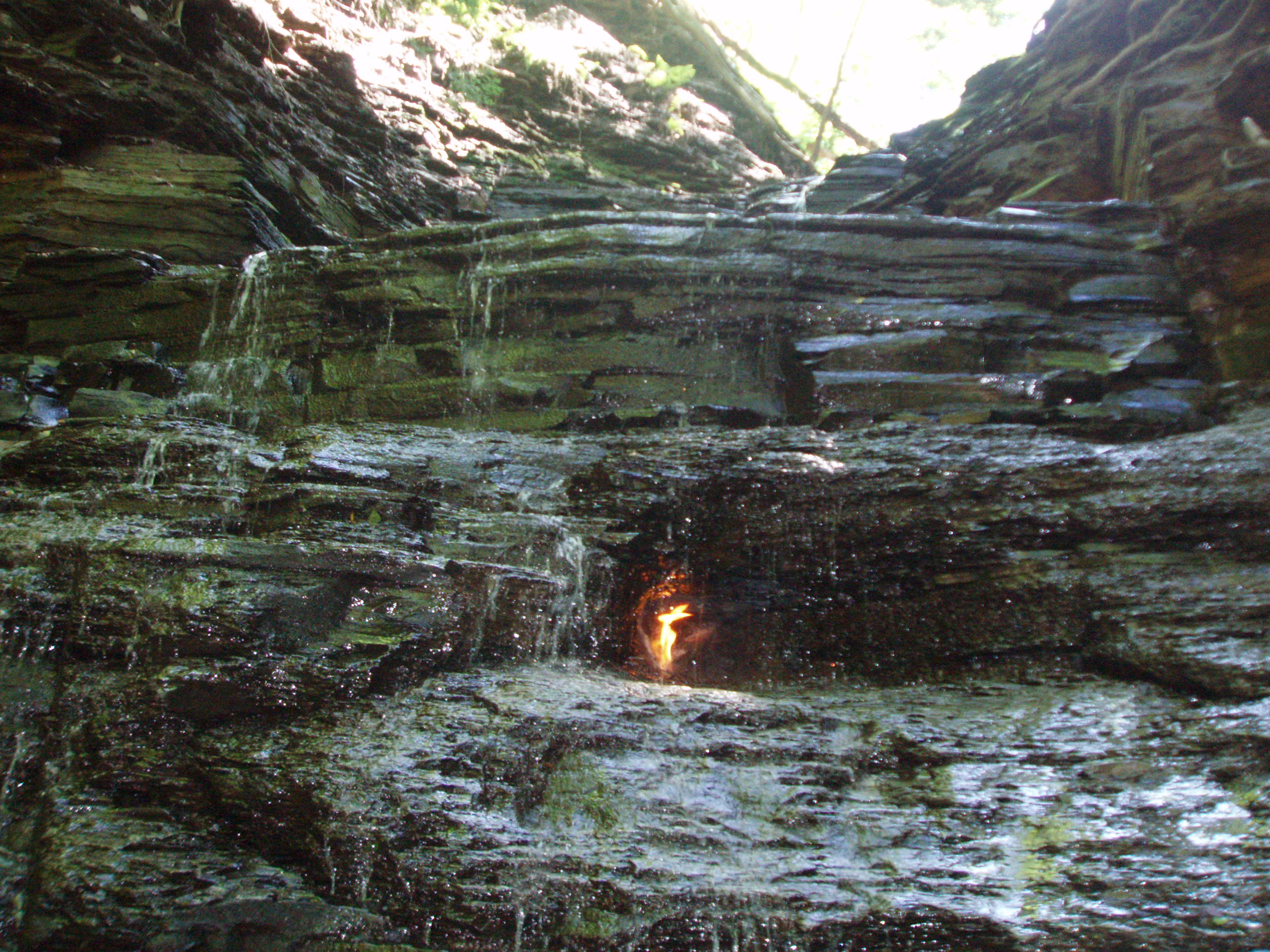
Eternal Flame Falls in Chestnut Ridge Park in Western New York, US

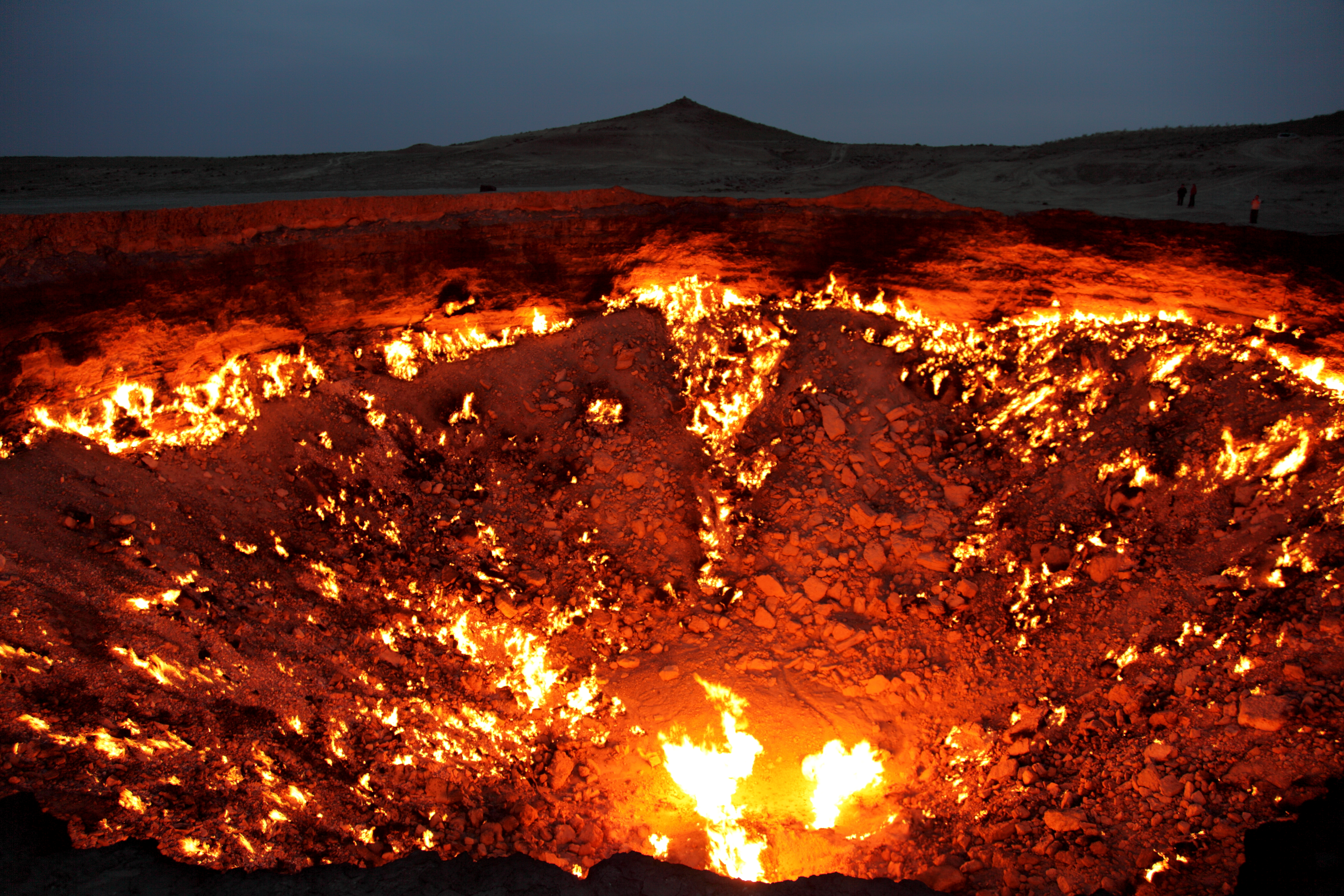
The Darvaza gas crater, near Derweze, Turkmenistan, has been burning since 1971.

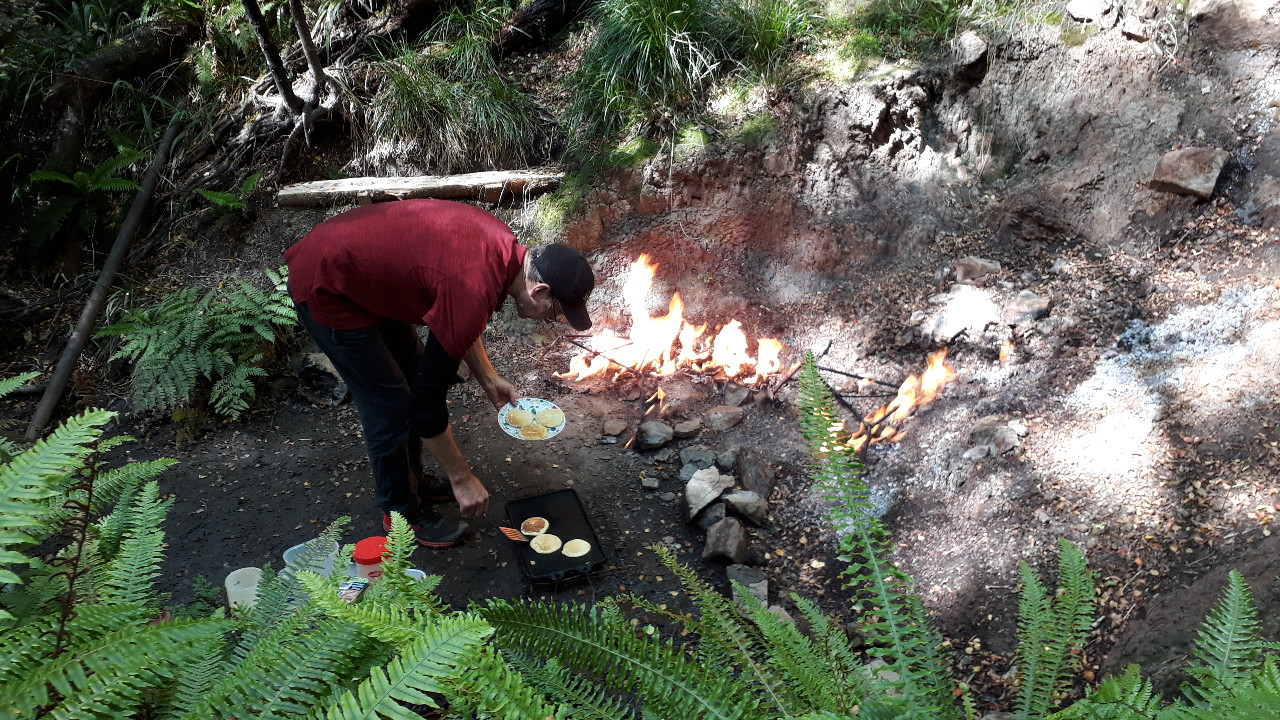
Tour guide cooks pancakes on natural flames at Murchison, New Zealand.

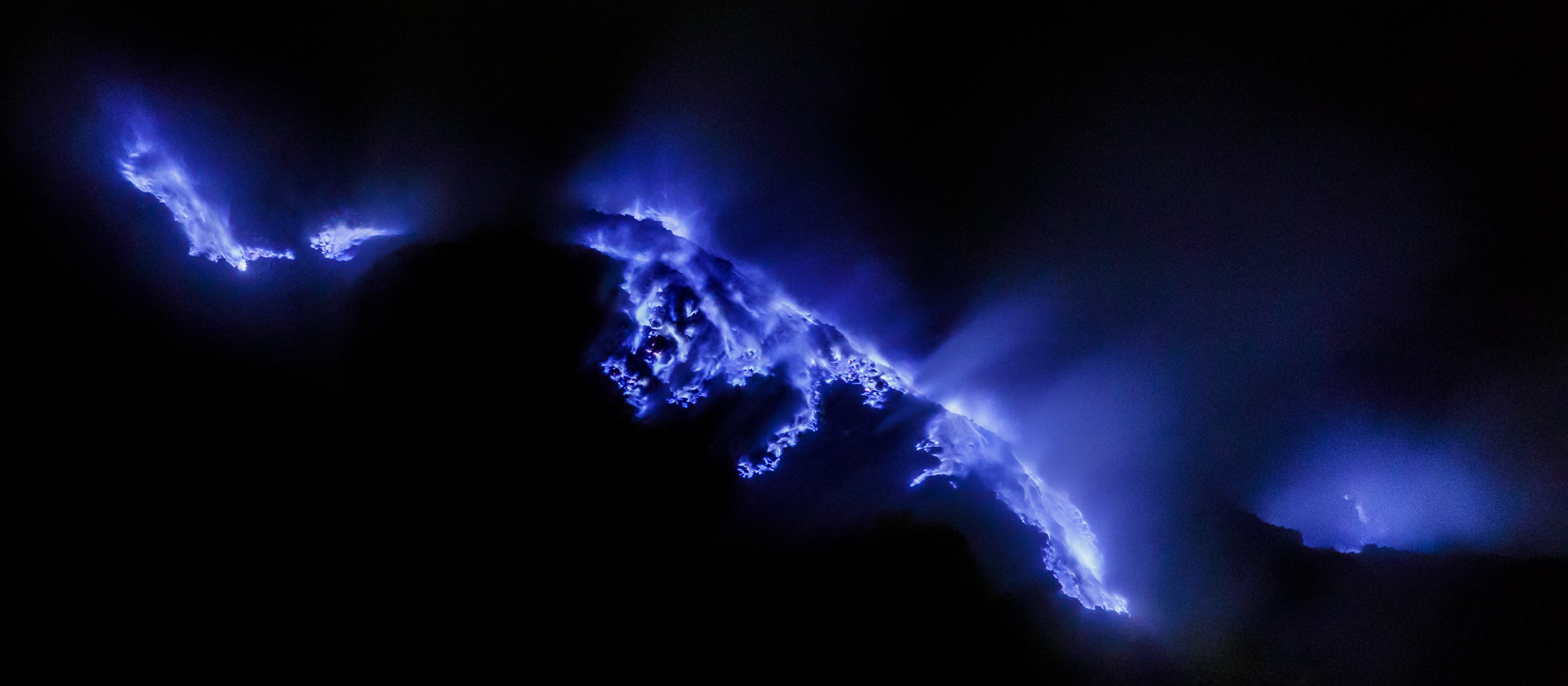
Api Biru or "Blue Lava" as seen at night on Kawah Ijen, in Indonesia

- Api Biru (Blue Fire), Ijen, Banyuwangi, East Java, Indonesia. This phenomenon comes from the ignition of sulfur continuously erupting to the surface. Its electric-blue flames are visible only at night.
- At Yanartaş in the Olympos National Park in Turkey, natural gas burns from many vents on the side of the mountain. It is thought to be the location of ancient Mount Chimaera. This is the largest venting of possibly abiogenic methane on Earth's terrestrial surface, and has been burning for over 2500 years. The flames were used in ancient times as a navigation beacon.
- The Eternal Flame Falls, featuring a small natural gas-fueled flame that burns behind a waterfall, can be found in Chestnut Ridge Park in Western New York, US.
- Flaming Geyser State Park in Washington, United States.
- Focul Viu - Lopătari in Lopatari, Buzau, Romania.
- An area in India's Great Himalayas, worshiped by Hindus as Jwala Devi Temple, or Jwalamukhi Devi Temple in Himachal Pradesh produces natural spontaneous flames and is said to have been doing so for thousands of years.
- The Darvaza gas crater fire, near Derweze, Turkmenistan, is a large hole leaking natural gas that has been burning since 1971.
- An eternal flame near Kirkuk, Iraq, known to the locals as Baba Gurgur, is said to have been burning for thousands of years.
- An eternal flame is found at the Yanar Dag mud volcano in Azerbaijan.
- In the Central Javanese village of Manggarmas in Indonesia, the Mrapen is a famous natural gas-fueled eternal flame originally ignited sometime before the 15th century era of the Demak Sultanate. Before September 2020, it had never died out despite intense tropical rain and winds. It is said that the sacred kris heirloom dagger of Demak Sultanate was forged in this flame. The Mrapen flame, considered sacred in Javanese culture, is used in an annual Waisak Buddhist ceremony, brought to Mendut and Borobudur temple. It was also used in several torch relays for sport events such as Pekan Olahraga Nasional held every four years, 1997 Southeast Asian Games, 2008 Asian Beach Games, 2011 Southeast Asian Games, and 2018 Asian Games.
- The Muktinath Temple in Nepal is worshipped for its sacred flame fueled by a natural gas seep at a small spring of water: the four ancient elements occurring in one location.
- In Murchison, New Zealand, a natural flame has been burning in the forest since it was lit by hunters in 1922. Access is facilitated by a tour company that serves tea and pancakes cooked on the fire.

=== Fueled by coal seams ===
- A coal seam-fueled eternal flame in Australia known as "Burning Mountain" is claimed to be the world's longest burning fire, at 6,000 years old.
- A coal mine fire in Centralia, Pennsylvania, has been burning beneath the borough since 1962.
- A coal field fire in Jharia, Jharkhand, India, is known to have been burning for almost a century.
- The Laurel Run mine fire started burning in 1915.
- The New Straitsville mine fire started burning in 1884.

== See also ==
- Fire worship
- Longest-lasting light bulbs
- Sanctuary lamp
- Olympic flame
- Perpetual stew
- Natural nuclear fission reactor
