= Memorial to the Soviet Internationalist Soldier =

Monument near Havana, Cuba

Coordinates: 22°59′40.65″N 82°28′17.25″W

The Memorial to the Soviet Internationalist Soldier (Spanish: Memorial al Soldado Internacionalista Soviético) is a monument and mausoleum situated south-west of Havana, Cuba. Inaugurated on 23 February 1978, it contains the remains of 67 Soviet military personnel who died in Cuba during the 1960s. There is an eternal flame and a time capsule at the centre of the memorial.

The memorial is situated close to the former Lourdes SIGINT Station and the San Pedro Highway Strip.

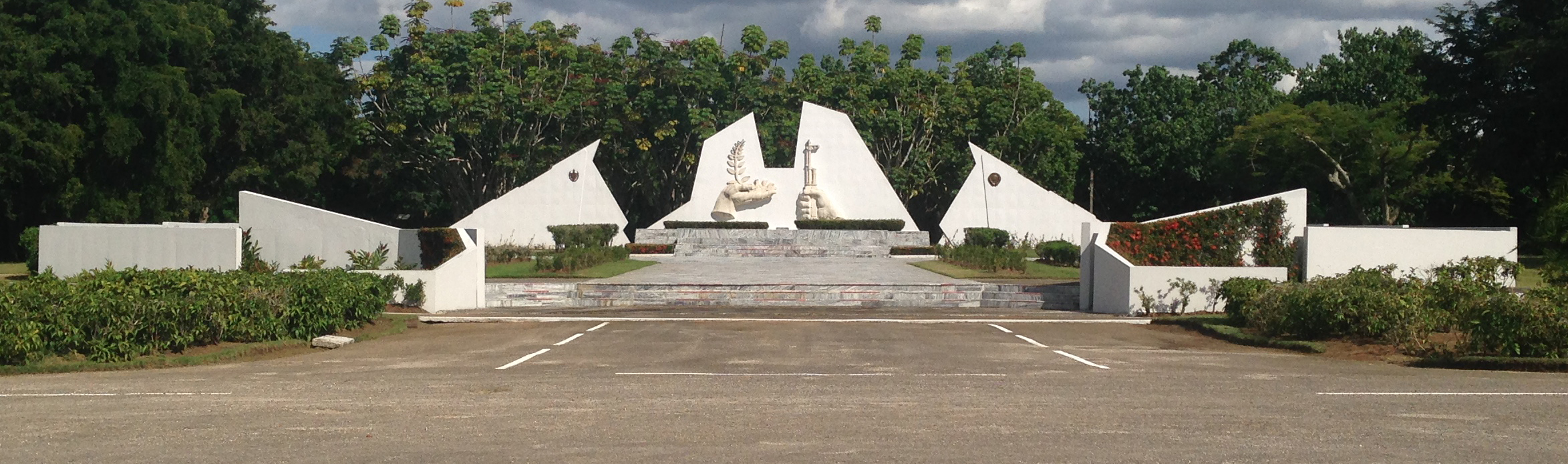

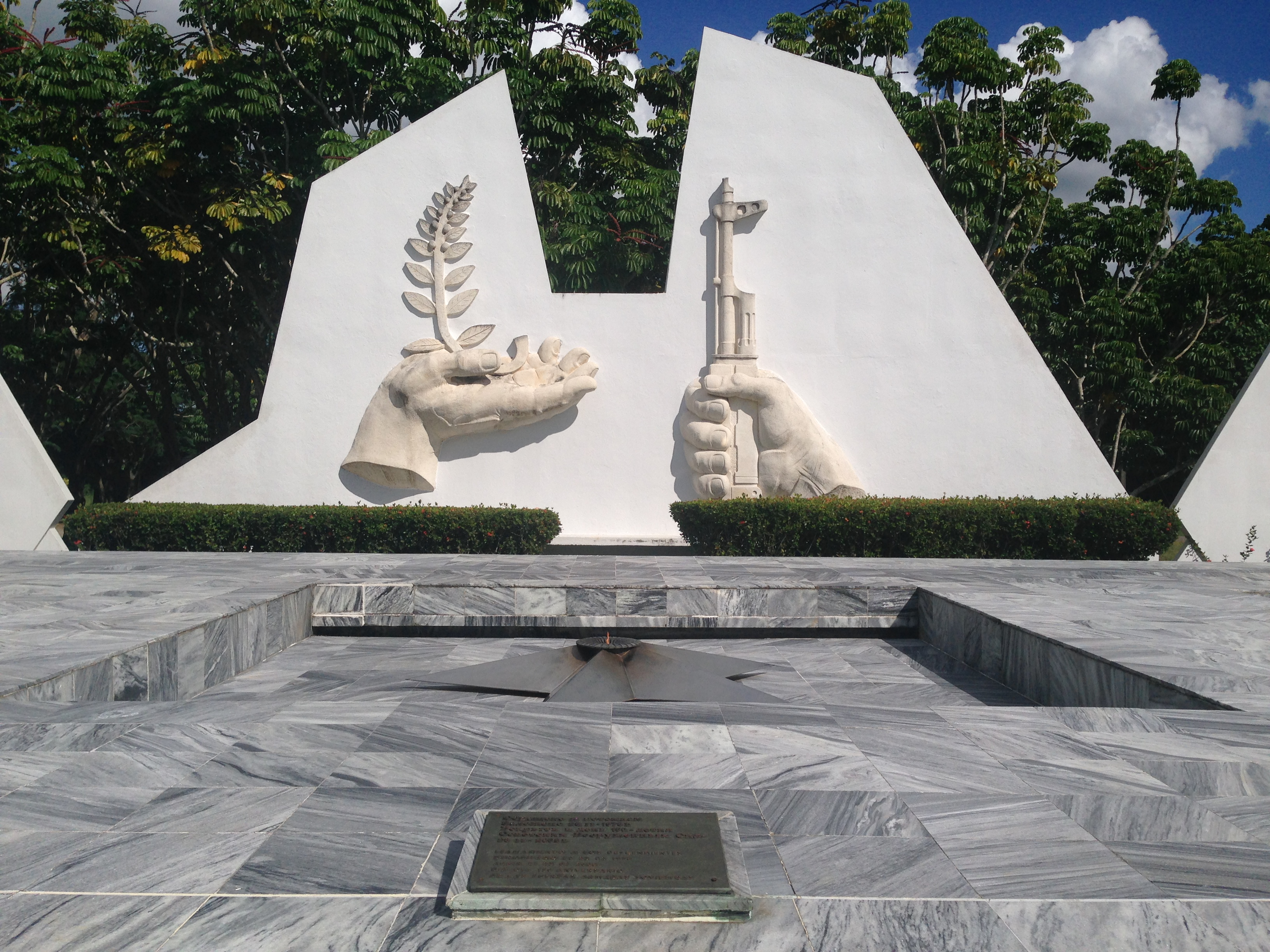
