= Eternal Flame (Bangladesh) =

Historic Landmark of Bangladesh

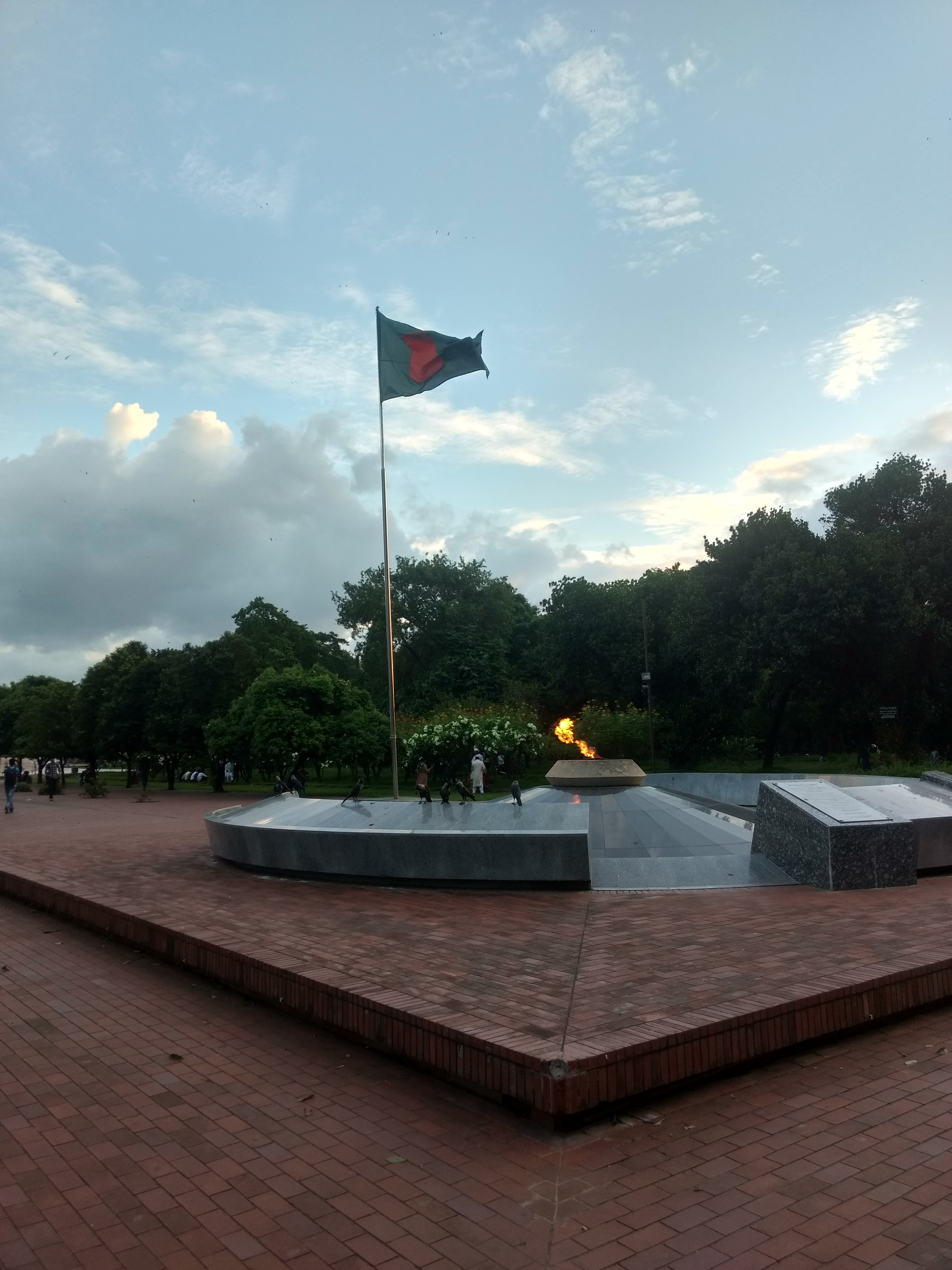
- The Eternal Flame

- Location within Bangladesh
- 23.7349°N 90.3961°E
- Location: Suhrawardy Udyan, Shahbag, Dhaka

History
- Established: March 26, 1997; 29 years ago

Site notes
- Area: 1 acre (0.40 ha) only Flame Complex. 68 acres (28 ha) Memory Complex.
- Governing body: Ministry of Liberation War Affairs

The Eternal Flame also known as Shikha Chironton (Bengali: শিখা চিরন্তন) is a historical landmark of Bangladesh. The flame was created to keep alive the memory of the martyrs who lost their lives in the Liberation War of Bangladesh and the defeat of the Pakistani Forces. It was jointly opened on March 26, 1997, on the occasion of Bangladesh independence day by then Prime minister of Bangladesh Sheikh Hasina, the President of South Africa Nelson Mandela, the President of Palestine Yasir Arafat and the President of Turkiye Süleyman Demirel.

== History ==
An initiative was taken in 1996 to commemorate Sheikh Mujibur Rahman's March 7 speech, respect for the martyrs of the Liberation War and the signing of the surrender document of the Pakistani army at this place. On this occasion, on March 7, 1997, the then Prime Minister Sheikh Hasina lit the eternal flame and inaugurated a nationwide procession. On March 17, 1997, the eternal flame reached Tungipara, Gopalganj, the birthplace of Sheikh Mujibur Rahman, and on March 26, it reached Suhrawardy Udyan. On that day, it was installed by four world-famous leaders. Nobel Peace Prize winner South African President Nelson Mandela, Palestine's Yasser Arafat, Turkey's Suleyman Demirel and the then Prime Minister of Bangladesh Sheikh Hasina. The national flag was hoisted by the then President Shahabuddin Ahmed. The Suhrawardy 'eternal flame' was installed in 1999.

== Gallery ==
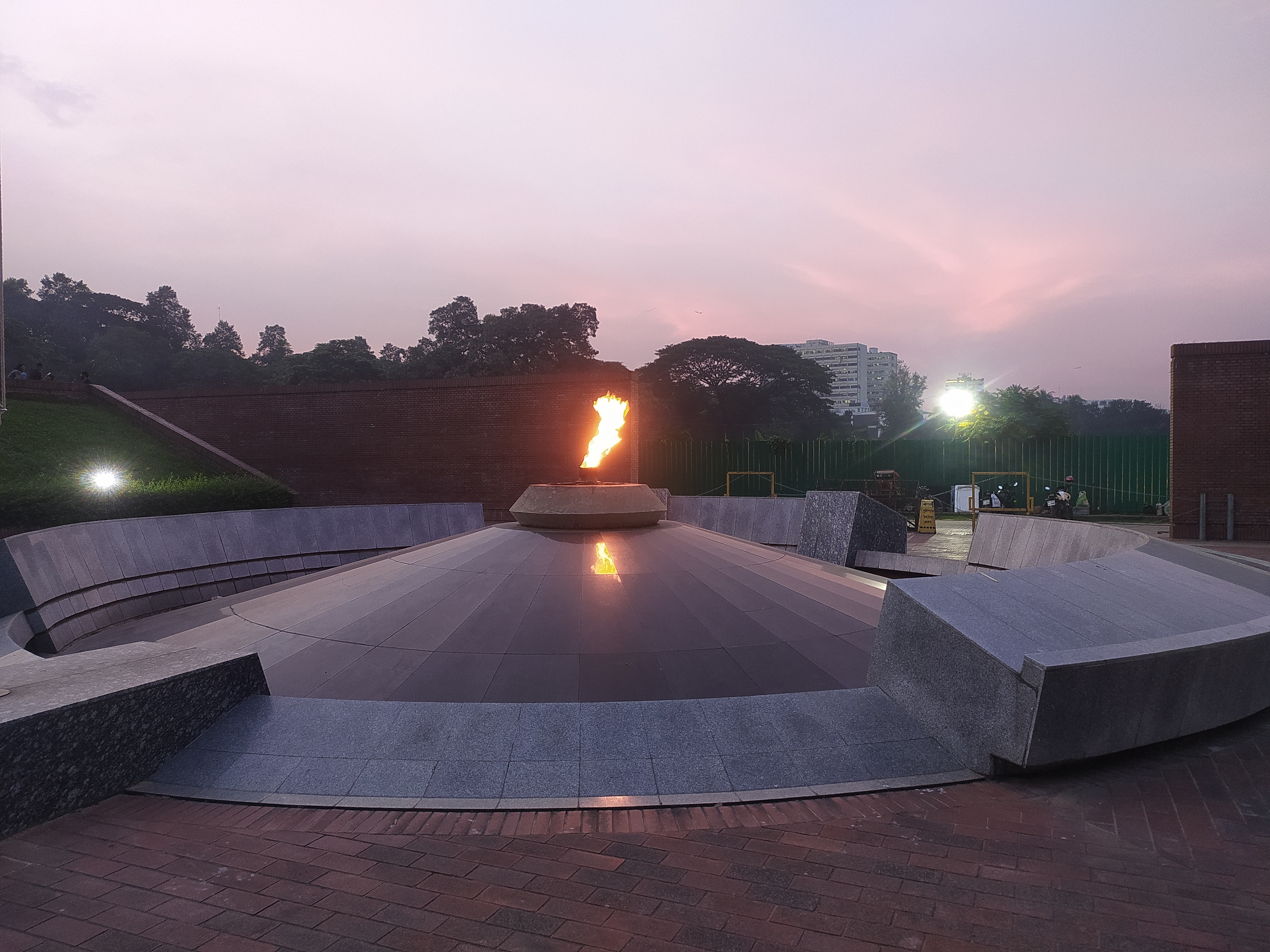
Eternal Flame

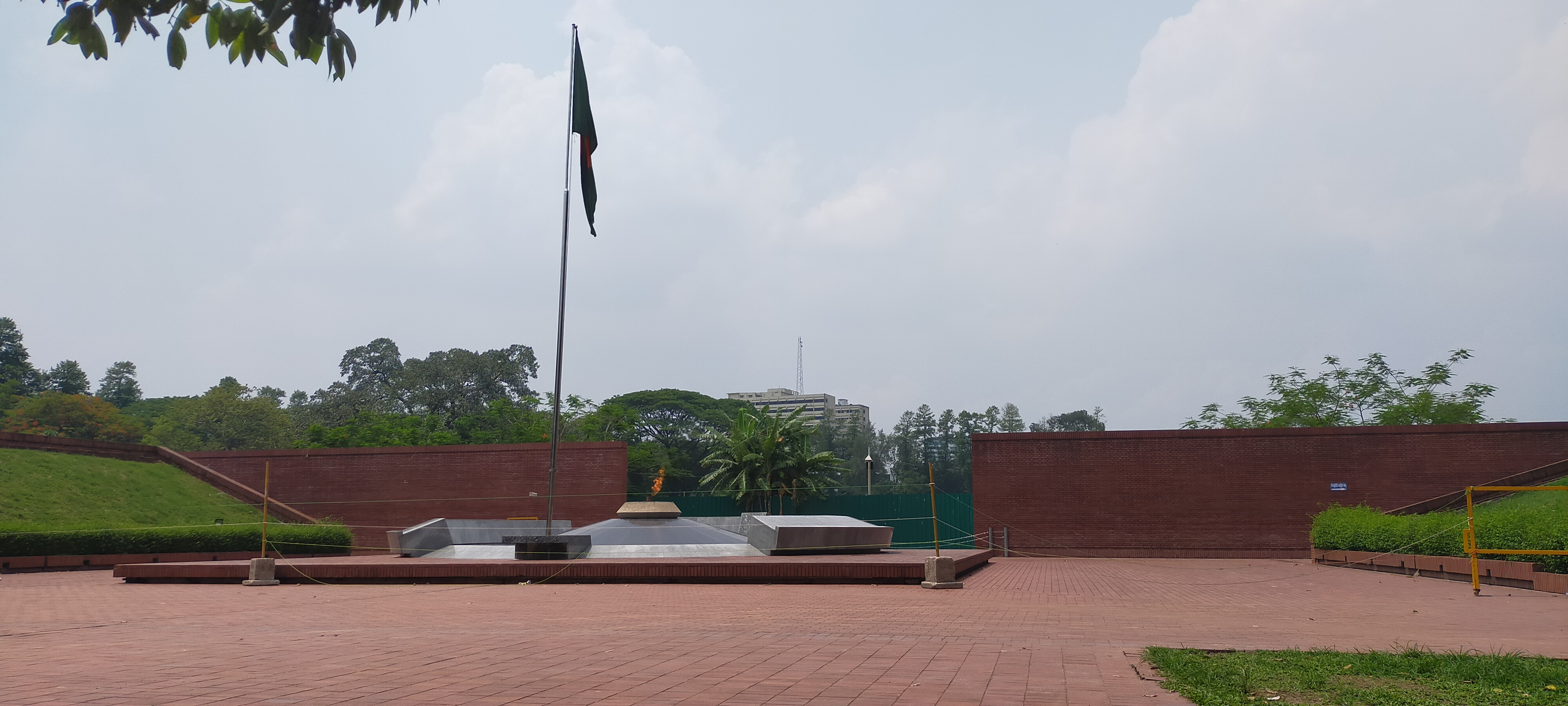
Eternal Flame with its court yard
