= Blue lava =

Optical phenomenon resulting from burning sulfur

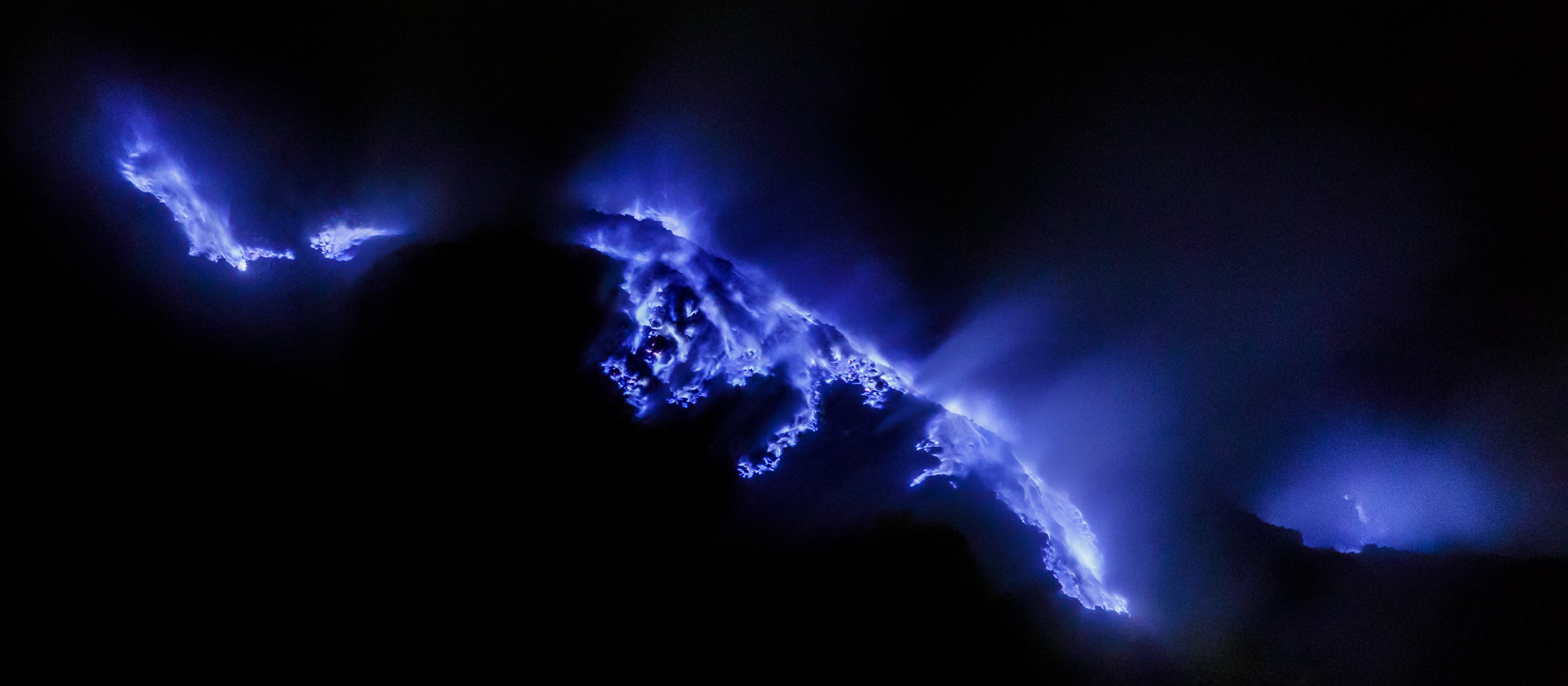
"Blue lava" as seen at night on Kawah Ijen, in Indonesia

Blue lava, also known as (Indonesian: Api Biru), and simply referred to as blue fire or sulfur fire, is a phenomenon that occurs when sulfur burns. It is an electric-blue flame that has the illusory appearance of lava. Despite the name, the phenomenon is actually a sulfuric fire that resembles the appearance of lava, rather than actual lava from a volcanic eruption. The most well-documented of these fires occur on Indonesia's Kawah Ijen volcano, where they regularly burn.

== Characteristics ==
"Blue lava" is an electric-blue fire that burns when sulfur combusts, producing a neon-blue flame. Sulfur burns when it comes into contact with hot air at temperatures above 360 °C (680 °F), which produces the energetic flames. Actual lava is red-orange in color, given its temperature. Truly-blue lava would require temperatures of at least 6,000 °C (10,830 °F), from Planck's law, which is much higher than any lava can naturally achieve on the surface of the Earth.

The most famous of these fires occur regularly on Indonesia's Kawah Ijen volcano, on the island of Java, which has some of the highest levels of sulfur in the world and is also a site of sulfur mining. Due to the occurrence of the flames, Kawah Ijen has also been nicknamed "the Blue Volcano". The crater of Kawah Ijen is the world's largest blue flame area. Kawah Ijen has large amounts of sulfur deposits and fumaroles, and the high temperatures from the underground volcanic heat frequently combusts the sulfur on the surface of the volcano, producing the blue fires. When sulfur from within the volcano breaches the surface, it can reach temperatures up to 600 °C (1,112 °F), and the sulfur immediately encounters lower temperatures and pressures at the surface, which causes the sulfur to immediately ignite and erupt blue flames up to 5 metres (16 ft) into the air. At such high temperatures, the sulfur melts, which sometimes flows down the face of the volcano while carrying the flames with it, making it appear as if blue lava is flowing down the volcano. Due to the blue color of the flames, the fires are essentially visible only at nighttime, as they are otherwise indistinguishable during the daytime.

Another location in which "blue lava" is regularly seen is on Dallol mountain, in Ethiopia. The blue fires also occur in Yellowstone National Park during wildfires, when fires burn and melt the large amounts of sulfur present in the park, creating the appearance of burning blue rivers of lava during such events. Remnants of past episodes exist on the ground in the form of black lines, where fires have previously melted sulfur. Similar blue flames were observed on Kīlauea in May 2018, during the volcano's 2018 lower Puna eruption, when lava from the volcano burned methane that had been trapped underground.

== See also ==
- Emission spectrum
- Flame test
- Volcanic gas
- Volcanism
