= Chaillet =

Chaillet is a surname. Notable people with the surname include:

- Adolphe Alexandre Chaillet (1867–after 1914), French inventor and electrical engineer
- Ned Chaillet (born 1944), American radio drama producer and director, writer and journalist
- Pierre Chaillet (1900–1972), French Jesuit priest
