= Palace Theater Light =

World's second longest-lasting light bulb

- Component type: Carbon-filament
- Working principle: Incandescence

The Palace Theater Light, also known as the Eternal Light, is an incandescent light bulb recognized by the Guinness Book of World Records as being the second oldest continuously operating light bulb in the world behind the Centennial Light. It is kept at the Stockyards Museum in Fort Worth, Texas.

== History ==
The Palace Theater Light was made by the Shelby Electric Company and has a carbon filament. It was installed on September 21, 1908, at the backstage of the Byers Opera House, and has been running since. A while later, a sign was placed to tell people not to turn the light off. The light survived when the opera house became the Palace Theater, and survived several power outages. It was put on its own circuit breaker "that was permanently set to 'on'". The theater house was marked for demolition in 1977, and the light bulb went to the local home of a man. He later said that he was aging and needed help taking care of it, which was followed in 1991 by the Stockyards Museum in Fort Worth Stockyards in Fort Worth, Texas, taking possession of it. They put it in a glass case and made sure that it ran 24 hours a day. The museum occasionally experiences power outages which causes the bulb to turn off. The bulb has its own power supply.

The Palace Theater Light was once thought to be the longest-running light bulb in the world. It appeared in the 1970 edition of the Guinness Book of World Records before it was replaced by the Centennial Light two years later when it was discovered to be older. The Palace Theater Light is now recognized as the second longest-running light bulb in the world. The museum holds birthday parties for the light bulb every September, and radio broadcaster Paul Harvey would give the bulb birthday wishes. It is not known why the bulb has lasted for so long. Speculators have suggested that it is because it does not get turned on and off, because it has a low wattage, or because it has less air inside due to how it was sealed. The bulb is not kept at its original brightness, as it is dimmed to preserve its lifespan.
