= Frank Beard =

Frank Beard may refer to:

- Frank Beard (golfer) (born 1939), American professional golfer
- Frank Beard (musician) (1949–2026), American drummer for ZZ Top
- Frank Beard (bishop), American bishop in the United Methodist Church
