= Shelby City School District =

School district in Ohio, United States

Address
- 109 West Smiley Avenue Shelby, Ohio, 44875; United States

District information
- Type: Public
- Grades: PK–12
- Schools: 3
- NCES District ID: 3910009

Students and staff
- Students: 1,794 (2024–2025)
- Teachers: 94.50 (on an FTE basis) (2024–2025)
- Staff: 191.91 (on an FTE basis) (2024–2025)
- Student–teacher ratio: 18.98 (2024–2025)

Other information
- Website: shelbyk12.org

Shelby City School District is a public school district serving students in Shelby, Ohio, United States. The school district enrolls 1,995 students as of the 2007–2008 academic year.

== Bond Issue ==
Currently Shelby City Schools are putting an issue on a special ballot in August 2010 in order to pass a bond issue to build new schools. This plan would include building a new high school with a new auditorium to replace the one in the aging middle school. The current Shelby Senior High would then be reconfigured into a 6-8 middle school. Central Elementary School and Shelby Middle School would be closed and the middle school would be demolished while Central would remain open as offices and storages. The remaining elementary schools, Auburn and Dowds, would be remodeled and would serve as K-5 elementary buildings. Russell Elementary School which was closed in 2005 would also be reopened and used the same as Auburn and Dowds. This plan would be funded by the bond issue and the Ohio State Facilities Commission who would be paying for nearly half of it. The state will only fund the bare minimum so other projects such as the auditorium and enhanced flooring which are both very important features to include would be funded by the bond issue solely. They are referred to as Locally Funded Initiatives.

== Schools ==
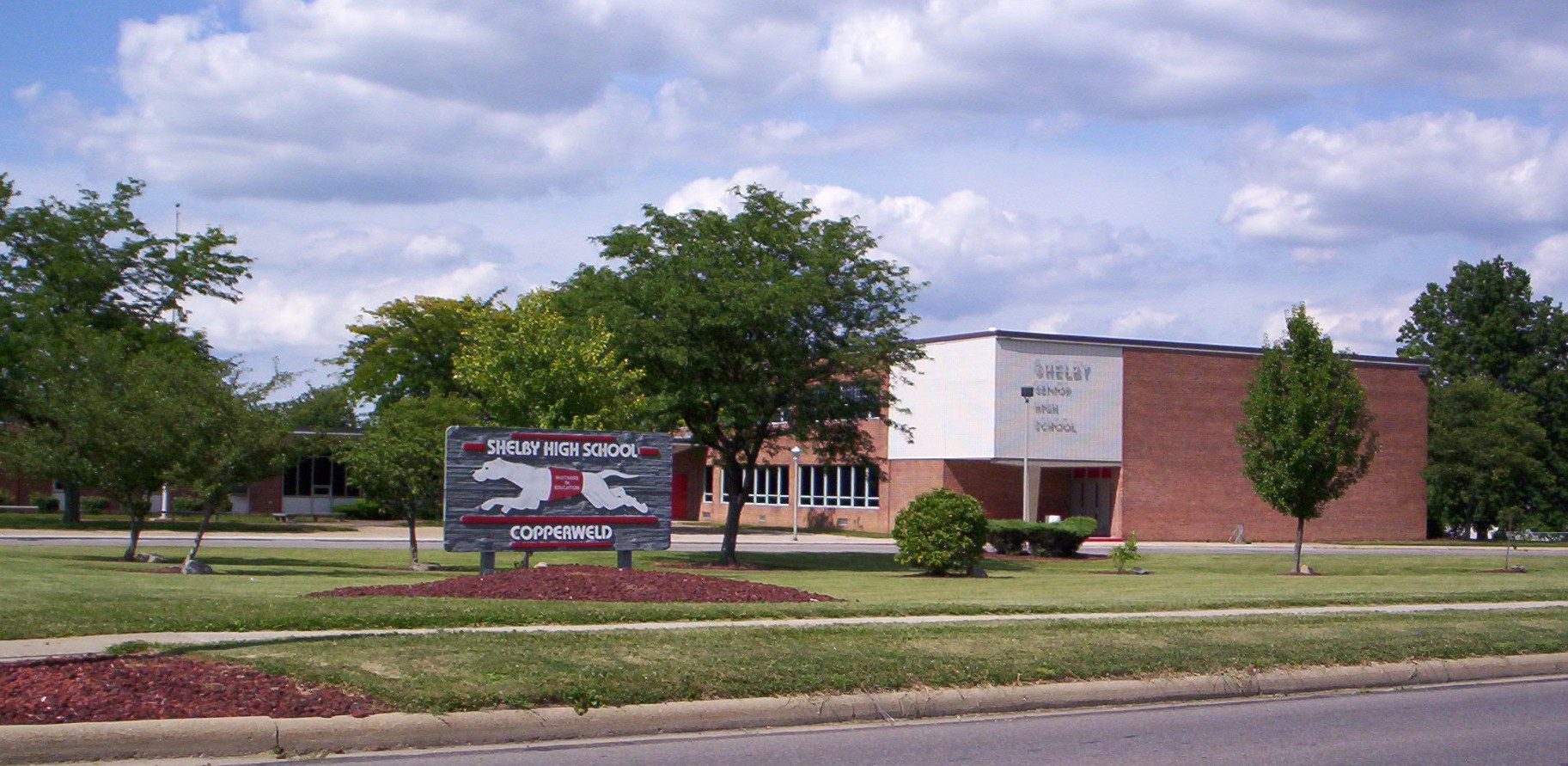
Shelby High School

=== Elementary schools ===
- Auburn Elementary School-Kindergarten, first, second, third and fourth graders.
- Dowds Elementary School-Kindergarten, first, second, third and fourth graders.
- Shelby Middle School-fifth, sixth, seventh and eighth graders.
- Shelby High School-ninth, tenth, eleventh, and twelve graders.
  - Russell (Whitney) Elementary School was used as a K-6 building until closing after the 2004–2005 school year.
  - Central Elementary School was used as a fifth to sixth until closing after the 2012–2013 school year.

=== Middle schools ===
- Shelby Middle School-Seventh and eighth graders.

=== High schools ===
- Shelby High School
