= Longest-lasting light bulbs =

This is a list of the longest-lasting incandescent light bulbs.

== Longest-lasting light bulb ==
The world's longest-lasting light bulb is the Centennial Light located at 4550 East Avenue, Livermore, California and installed by Kevin Devine. It is maintained by the Livermore-Pleasanton Fire Department. The fire department claims that the bulb is at least 125 years old, having been installed in 1901, and has only been turned off a handful of times. The bulb has been noted by The Guinness Book of World Records, Ripley's Believe It or Not!, and General Electric as being the world's longest-lasting light bulb.

Many of the longest-lasting light bulbs have been infrequently turned off. Most of the wear and tear that leads to burnouts in incandescent light bulbs is caused by turning them on and off, not by burning them. Each time the bulb is turned on and off, the filament is heated and cooled. This causes the material of the filament to expand and contract, in turn causing stress cracks to develop. The more the light is turned on and off, the larger these cracks grow, until eventually the filament breaks, thus causing the light to burn out. Another reason for the longevity of bulbs is the size, quality and material of the filament. Additionally, the consistency of the power delivery to the bulb and how little it fluctuates prevents the bulb's filaments from being damaged by dirty power (brown-outs cause damage to electrical systems).

== Other long-lasting light bulbs ==
=== Second ===
The second-longest-lasting light bulb is in Fort Worth, Texas. The bulb, known as the Eternal Light, was credited as being the longest-lasting bulb in the 1970 edition of the Guinness Book of World Records, two years before the discovery of the Livermore bulb.

The bulb was originally at the Byers Opera House, and was installed by a stage-hand, Barry Burke, on September 21, 1908 (117 years ago), above the backstage door. The theater was demolished in 1977, and the bulb was transported to a museum located in the Livestock Exchange Building. Since its installation in the museum, it has only been turned off once—by accident—before being put on its own unswitched circuit. According to museum officials the lightbulb also lost power a number of times during the rolling blackouts of 2021.

Another working light bulb dating from 1908 is in Norway, in the "Kongevognen" (King's wagon) from Thamshavnsbanen railway in Trøndelag, Norway. The bulb is one of the original bulbs of the wagon that was ordered built by Christian Thams in 1908, and was delivered by the Edison factory in the United States. The wagon is now part of a museum, and the light bulb is in use several times per week.

=== Third ===
The third longest lasting light bulb began operation in 1929-30 when BC Electric's Ruskin Generating Station (British Columbia Canada) commenced service. The bulb has been on ever since, and may in fact have the longest continuous service in the world with other bulbs having interruptions in operation during their existence.

=== Fourth ===
The fourth-longest-lasting light bulb was above the back door of Gasnick Supply, a New York City hardware store on Second Avenue, between 52nd and 53rd Streets. It was installed in 1912 (114 years ago), according to store owner Jack Gasnick. Apparently Gasnick tried several times to discredit the Centennial Light in Livermore. In 1981, he wrote to Dear Abby and claimed that the Livermore bulb had burned out, although it had not. In 1983, he wrote to Guinness and claimed that the Livermore bulb was a fraud. In his opinion as a trained electrical technician, the socket for the bulb was incorrect for its age. He also pointed out that there were no carbon deposits on the inside of the glass, unlike his bulb, which was filthy. He then declared his bulb to be the world's oldest, seemingly unaware of the bulb in Fort Worth.

The ultimate disposition of Gasnick and his bulb are not known. The store, as well as the entire half-block on which it stood, was razed in 2003.

=== Fifth ===
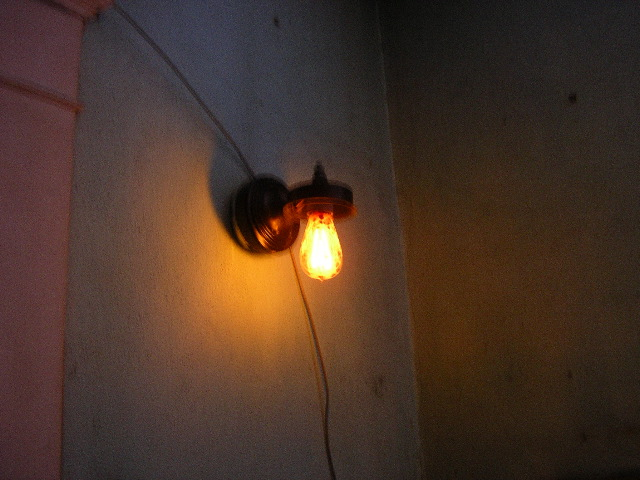
The Mangum Light Bulb is located in the firehouse in Mangum, Oklahoma.

The fifth-longest-lasting light bulb was located in a fire house in Mangum, Oklahoma. It was installed circa 1926–1929. The bulb was not attached to any special electrical supply, and when the power went off, so did the bulb.

The firefighters in Mangum were willing to show visitors the light bulb as long as they were not busy with something else. The Mangum Light Bulb burned out on Friday, December 13, 2019.

=== Sixth ===
The sixth-longest-lasting light bulb was in a washroom at the Martin & Newby Electrical Shop in Ipswich, England. Given its shape and design, it was thought to date from the 1930s. It burned out in 2001.

=== Seventh ===
The seventh-longest-lasting light bulb is located in the Cinema Napoleón in Río Chico, Venezuela. It was installed in 1957 and never turned off due to a local superstition. The light bulb has only been turned off during electricity cuts.

== Edison and the Eternal Light ==
Thomas Edison designed a bulb that was supposed to last forever, called the Eternal Light, and turned it on on October 22, 1929. The bulb is located in the Edison Memorial Tower at the Thomas Edison Center at Menlo Park, a small museum near the tower in Menlo Park, New Jersey. The tower fell down in 1937, but the bulb's power was supposedly uninterrupted, according to General Electric, and the bulb continued to burn while a second tower was constructed. However, according to museum curator Jack Stanley, the bulb is fake, consisting of a hollow bulb illuminated by a series of automobile headlights mounted in the display's base.

== See also ==
- Adolphe Alexandre Chaillet
- Durable good
- Eternal flame
- FogCam
- Phoebus cartel
- Sanctuary lamp
