= Shelby Cycle Company =

American bicycle company

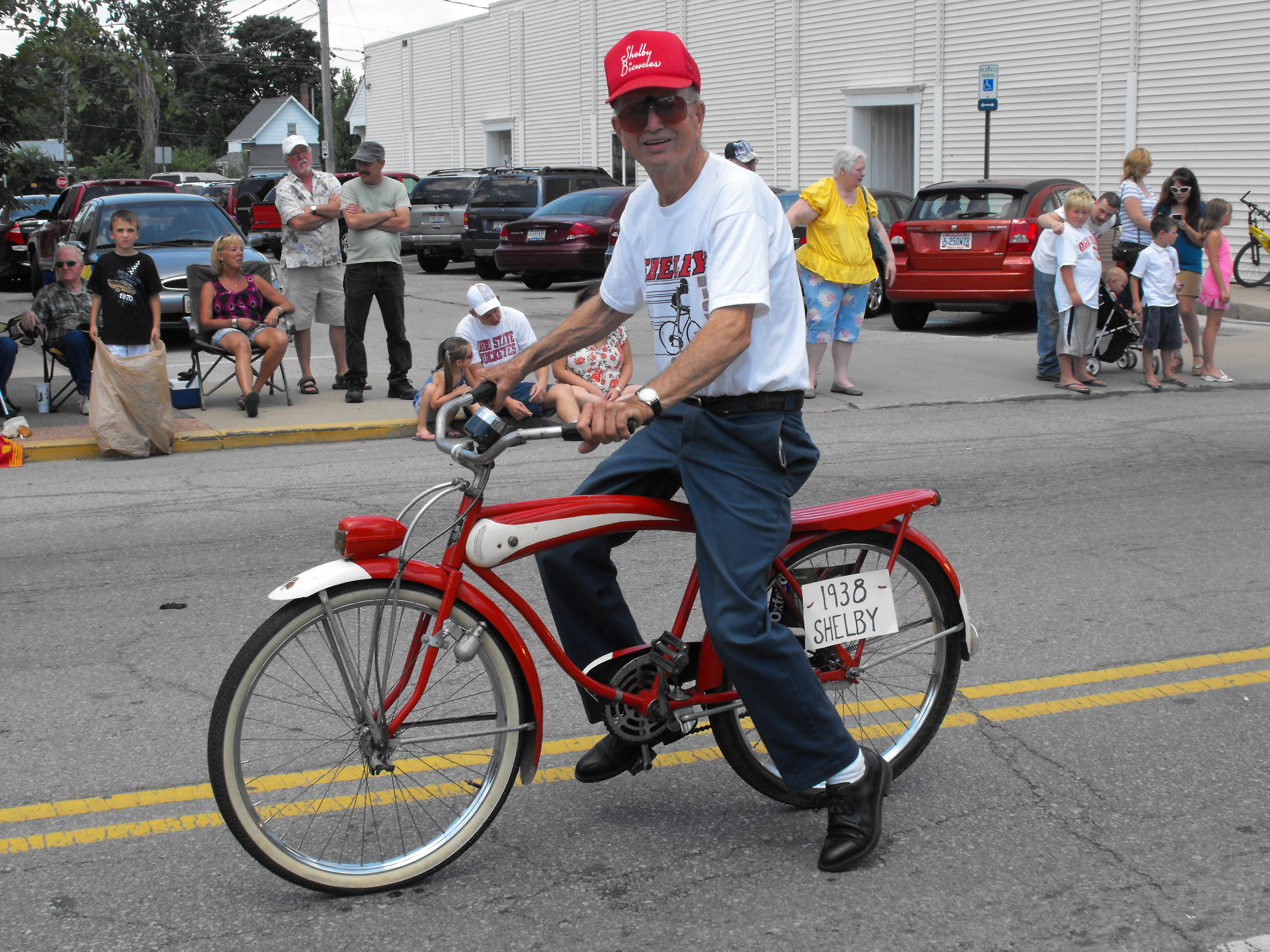
A restored Shelby Bicycle on display at Shelby Bicycle Days Festival

The Shelby Cycle Company manufactured bicycles in Shelby, Ohio from 1925 to 1953. Their bikes are popular among collectors for their styling. They produced a bicycle in 1928 with a Charles Lindbergh theme called the "Lindy Flyer", and they were responsible for the Donald Duck bicycles in the 1950s. Many of their models fit the cruiser bicycle description. Shelby also made bicycles for other retailers such as Montgomery Ward, Spiegel, Gambles stores, Firestone and Goodyear. AMF purchased Shelby in 1953.

A separate company, called The Shelby Bicycle Company, manufactured the Ideal Bicycle from 1895 until around 1901 or 1902.
