= Frank Beard (bishop) =

American bishop

- Occupation: Bishop
- Spouse: Melissa Kay Riffell
- Children: Eleanor Lee and Emily Beard

Frank Beard is an American United Methodist Church bishop serving the Illinois Great Rivers Conference.

Beard was elected to the episcopacy July 13, 2016 at the North Central Jurisdiction quadrennial meeting at Peoria, Illinois.

== Biography ==
=== Education ===
Beard received his B.A. Degree from Taylor University, in Upland, Indiana in 1979. In 1982, he received his M.Div. Degree from Asbury Theological Seminary in Wilmore, Kentucky. In 1986, Beard was awarded a S.T.M. Degree from Christian Theological Seminary in Indianapolis, Indiana. He received a D.Min. Degree from Asbury in 1997.

=== Personal life ===
Beard is married to Melissa Kay Riffell. They have two children: Eleanor Lee and Emily Beard.

== Ordained ministry ==
Postings:

- Castleton United Methodist Church, Indianapolis, Indiana | 2012 – 2016
- Kokomo District Superintendent | 2004 – 2012
- Warsaw Walnut Creek UMC, Warsaw, Indiana | 1997 – 2004
- Elkhart Faith UMC, Associate, Elkhart, Indiana | 1993 – 1997
- Kokomo Beamer UMC, Kokomo, Indiana | 1986 – 1993
- Anderson New Hope UMC, Anderson, Indiana | 1982 – 1986
