= Joel Hunter =

American pastor (born 1948)

Joel Carl Hunter (born April 18, 1948) is an American pastor and author. He is the author of A New Kind of Conservative (Regal, 2008), Church Distributed (Distributed Press, 2008), and Inner State 80: Your Journey on the High Way (Higher Life, 2009). Hunter accepted the presidency of the Christian Coalition in 2006, but resigned before taking office. He delivered the closing benediction on the final day of the 2008 Democratic National Convention.

== Early life and education ==
Hunter grew up in Shelby, Ohio.

He attended Ohio University, where he participated in the civil rights movement. In April 1968, following the assassination of Martin Luther King Jr., he experienced a religious conversion and felt called to ministry. He earned a bachelor's degree from Ohio University, followed by a Master of Divinity and a Doctor of Ministry from Christian Theological Seminary in Indiana.

== Career ==
Hunter served as a United Methodist Church minister in Indiana for 15 years.

In 1985, Hunter became senior pastor at Northland Church in Longwood, Florida. Hunter accepted an offer to become president of the Christian Coalition of America in late 2006, but withdrew before taking office after it became clear he intended to steer the organization toward more moderate positions. In August 2017, Hunter announced he would step down as senior pastor of Northland; no departure date was set at the time of the announcement.

Hunter delivered the closing benediction at the 2008 Democratic National Convention, prayed with Barack Obama on the day of the 2008 U.S. presidential election, and offered a blessing at the Pre-Inaugural Worship Service at St. John's Episcopal Church on January 20, 2009. On June 18, 2026, Hunter co-led the invocation at the dedication ceremony for the Obama Presidential Center in Chicago, held for invited guests one day ahead of the center's public opening on Juneteenth.

On February 5, 2009, President Obama appointed Hunter to the Advisory Council of the White House Office of Faith-Based and Neighborhood Partnerships. In that role, he advised on interfaith relations, fatherhood initiatives, and abortion reduction. In April 2011, he joined the Commission on Accountability and Policy for Religious Organizations.

In 2023, Hunter became Pastor of Community Benefit at Action Church in Winter Park, Florida. That same year, he became chair of the Central Florida Pledge.

== Evangelical climate initiative ==
In February 2006, Hunter signed the Evangelical Climate Initiative, a document supporting climate action based on findings from the Intergovernmental Panel on Climate Change. Signatories included Rick Warren, the presidents of 39 evangelical colleges, and Salvation Army leadership.

Hunter served as a leading spokesman for the initiative, defending the document on theological and moral grounds. In 2006 and 2008, he attended environmental symposiums at Windsor Castle. Grist magazine listed him among fifteen religious leaders advocating environmental stewardship.

== Personal life ==
Hunter married his wife Becky in 1972, and they raised three sons, have seven grandchildren and two great grandchildren.
