= Centennial Light =

World's longest-lasting light bulb

Coordinates: 37°40′48″N 121°44′22″W

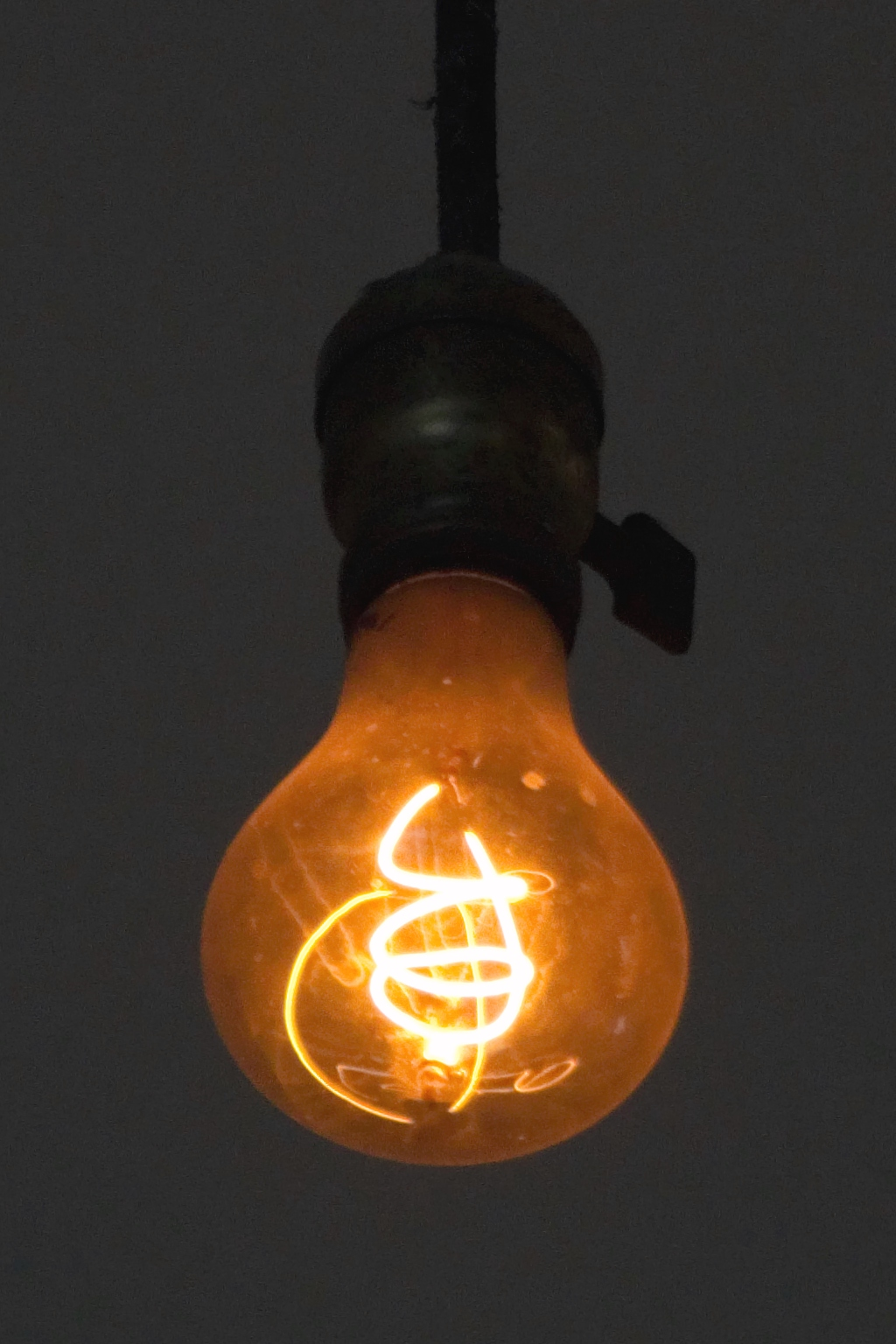
- Livermore's Centennial Light Bulb
- Component type: Carbon-filament
- Working principle: Incandescence

The Centennial Light is an incandescent light bulb recognized as the oldest known operating light bulb. It was first illuminated in 1901, and has only been turned off a few brief times since. It is located at 4550 East Avenue, Livermore, California, and is open to public viewing. Due to its longevity, the bulb has been noted by The Guinness Book of World Records, Ripley's Believe It or Not!, and General Electric. The light has been the subject of many TV shows and news reports along with at least four books, and has its own website.

The handmade lightbulb was originally manufactured by the Shelby Electric Company of Shelby, Ohio, towards the end of the 1890s and donated to the Livermore-Pleasanton Fire Department in 1901. It has been relocated several times since and remains in the care of the fire department to this day. The bulb's longevity has been attributed to the high quality of its manufacture, it being seldomly turned off, and its low wattage. Originally a 60-watt bulb, the light has weakened over the years and now emits a dim light equivalent to a 4-watt bulb, about the strength of a typical nightlight.

== History ==
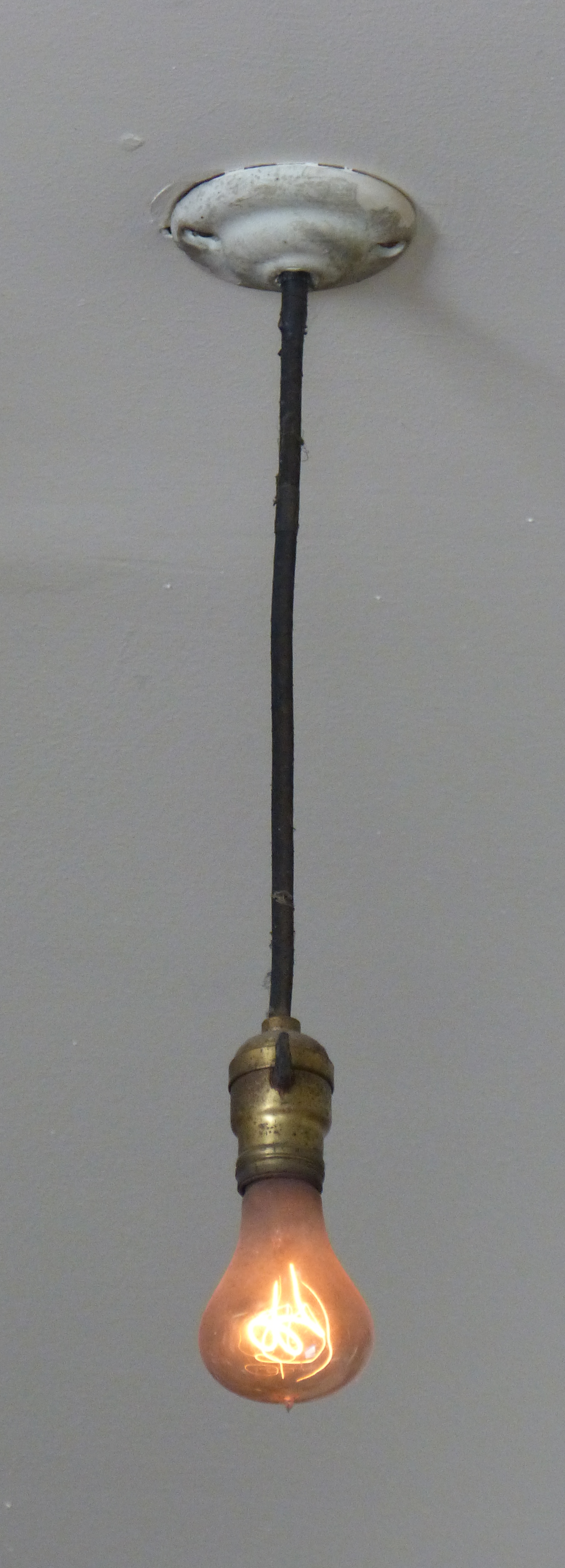
The pendant light at Fire Station #6 in which the bulb is installed

The Centennial Light was originally a 60-watt bulb, but has since dimmed significantly and is now as bright as a 4-watt bulb. The hand-blown, carbon-filament common light bulb was invented by Adolphe Chaillet, a French engineer who filed a patent for this socket technology. It was manufactured in Shelby, Ohio, by the Shelby Electric Company in the late 1890s; many just like it still exist and can be found functioning. According to Zylpha Bernal Beck, the bulb was donated to the Fire Department by her father, Dennis Bernal, in 1901. Bernal owned the Livermore Power and Water Company and donated the bulb to the fire station when he sold the company. That story has been supported by firefighter volunteers of that era.

Evidence suggests that the bulb has hung in at least four locations. It was originally hung in 1901 in a hose cart house on L Street, then moved to a garage in downtown Livermore used by the fire and police departments. The bulb was saved during the fire station's 1937 renovation, during which it was off for approximately one week.

Its unusual longevity was first noticed in 1972 by reporter Mike Dunstan. After weeks of interviewing people who had lived in Livermore all their lives, he wrote "Light Bulb May Be World's Oldest", published in the Tri-Valley Herald. Dunstan contacted the Guinness Book of World Records, Ripley's Believe It or Not, and General Electric, who all confirmed it as the longest-lasting bulb known in existence.

In 1976, the fire department moved to Fire Station #6 with the bulb; the bulb socket's cord was severed for fear that unscrewing the bulb could damage it. It was deprived of electricity for only 22 minutes during the transfer, which was made in a specially designed box and with full firetruck escort. An electrician was on hand to install the bulb into the new fire station's emergency generator. Ripley's Believe It Or Not stated that the short delay would not mar the bulb's continuous burning record. Since that move, the bulb has run continuously on an uninterruptible power supply; previously it had only been off the grid for short periods of time. In 2001, the bulb's 100th birthday was celebrated with a community barbecue and live music.

A series of photos of the Centennial Lightbulb being reestablished

On the evening of May 20, 2013, the general public witnessed, through a dedicated webcam, that the bulb had apparently burned out. The next morning, an electrician was called in to confirm its status. It was determined that the bulb had not burned out when the dedicated power supply was bypassed, using an extension cord. The power supply was found to have been faulty. Approximately 9 hours and 45 minutes had passed before the light was reestablished.

The bulb is cared for by the Centennial Light Bulb Committee, a partnership of the Livermore-Pleasanton Fire Department, Livermore Heritage Guild, Lawrence Livermore National Laboratories, and Sandia National Laboratories. The Livermore-Pleasanton Fire Department plans to house and maintain the bulb for the rest of its life, regardless of length. When it does go out, they have no plans for it, although Ripley's Believe it or Not! has requested it for their collection of objects.

== Reasons for longevity ==
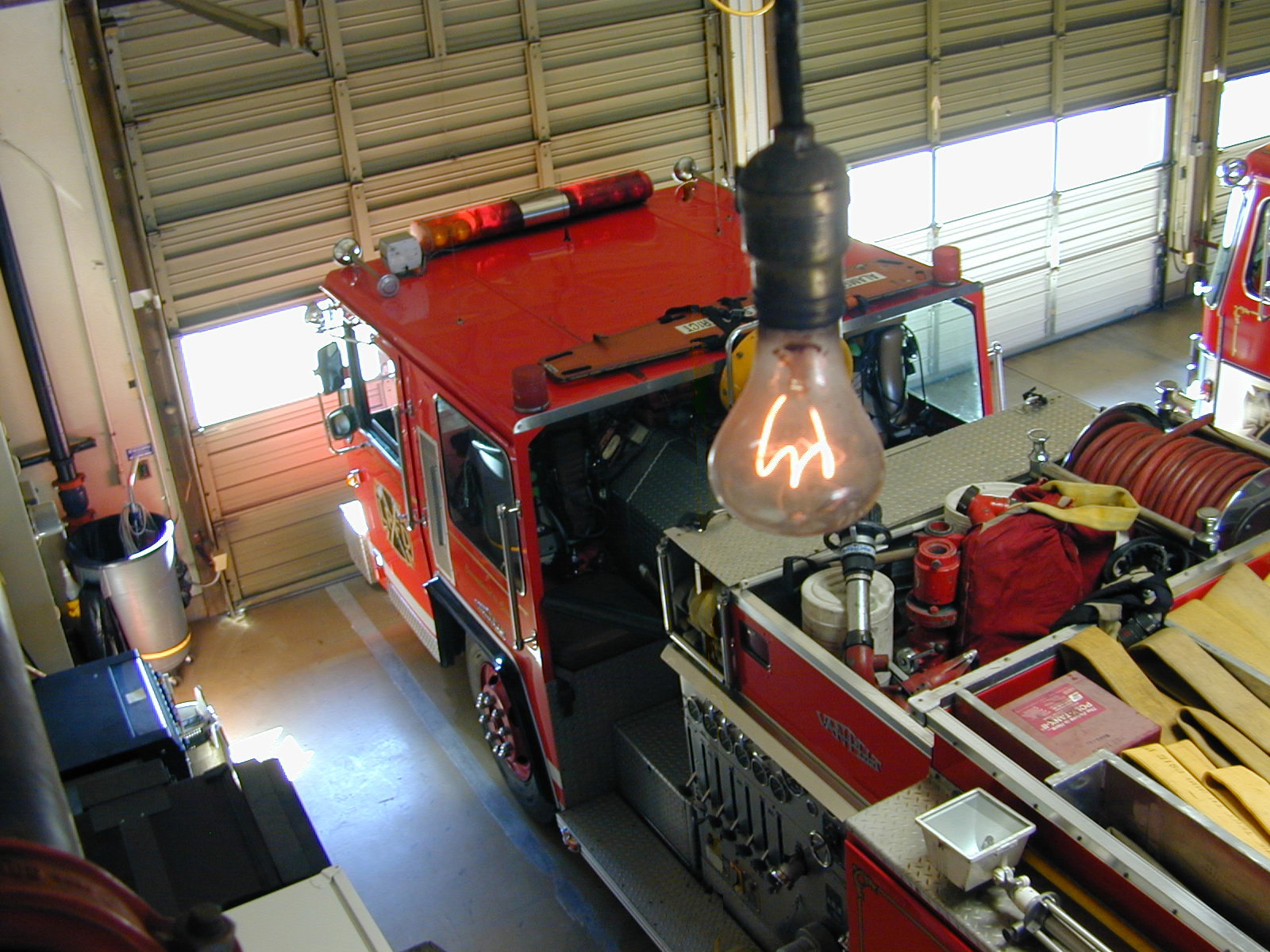
Centennial Bulb in fire station 6

Several reasons have been cited for the bulb's extensive lifespan. Its continuous operation has largely eliminated the stresses associated with turning a light bulb on and off, the act of which causes the temperature of the bulb to increase and decrease. The bulb was made by hand, using a carbon filament (of greater thickness and strength than the tungsten filaments used in most modern lightbulbs) along with brass and glass components of high quality. The low wattage (originally 60 watts, now approximately four) and high nitrogen atmosphere inside the bulb have also contributed to its longevity.

== Publicity ==
The bulb was officially listed in the Guinness Book of World Records as "the most durable light" in 1972, replacing the Palace Theater Light in Fort Worth, Texas. The bulb was listed in the book for the next 16 editions. It was not listed during 1988–2006, without a reason being given, before returning in 2007. At least four books have been written about the bulb.

According to the fire chief, every few months a news outlet will publish a story on the bulb, generating visitors and general interest, then it will drop back into obscurity for a while. Dozens of magazines and newspapers have featured articles on the bulb. The bulb has been visited and featured by many major news channels in the United States, including NBC, ABC, Fox News, CBS, WB, CNN and NPR. The bulb has received letters acknowledging and celebrating its longevity from the city of Shelby, Ohio, the Alameda County Board of Supervisors, the California State Assembly, the California State Senate, Congresswoman Ellen Tauscher, Senator Barbara Boxer, and President George W. Bush. The bulb was featured on an episode of MythBusters on December 13, 2006, in the PBS documentary Livermore and an episode of California's Gold with Huell Howser, in an episode of 99% Invisible, and mentioned in the web series 17776.

== See also ==
- Durable good
- Eternal flame
- Longest-lasting light bulbs
- Phoebus cartel
