= Shelby High School (Ohio) =

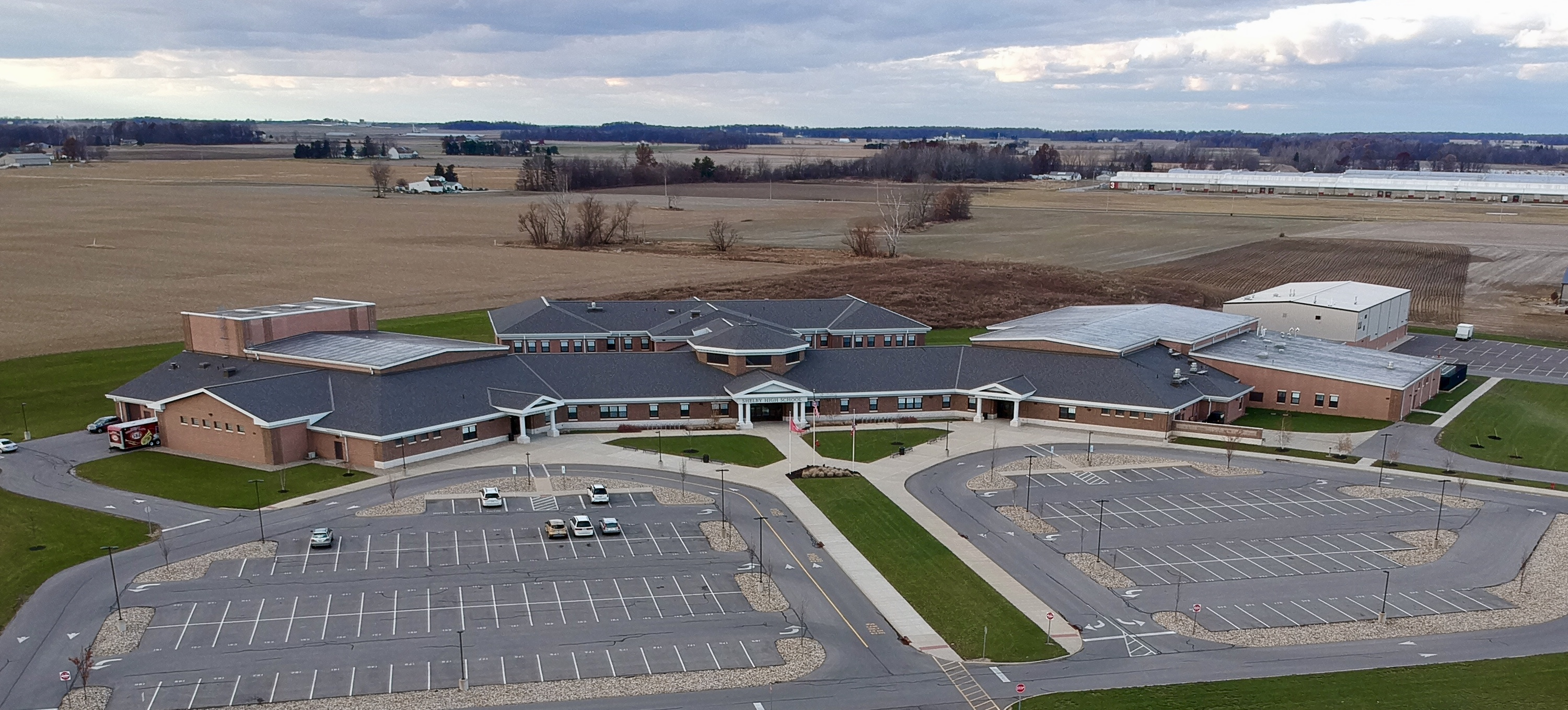
- Shelby High School in 2013

Location
- 1 Whippet Way; Shelby, Ohio 44875; 40°53′15″N 82°40′14″W

Information
- Type: Public
- School district: Shelby City School District
- Superintendent: Michael Browning
- Principal: John Gies
- Teaching staff: 31.42 (FTE)
- Grades: 9-12
- Enrollment: 499 (2022–23)
- Student to teacher ratio: 15.88
- Colors: Red & black
- Fight song: Red and Gray (arrangement of Washington & Lee Swing)
- Athletics conference: Mid-Ohio Athletic Conference
- Mascot: Whippet
- Rival: Galion, HS (Ohio) Tigers
- Yearbook: Scarlet S
- Website: www.shelbyk12.org

Shelby High School is located in Shelby, Ohio, United States. The school serves students in grades 9-12 and is part of the Shelby City School District. A long time member of the Northern Ohio League (1944-2017), Shelby joined the Sandusky Bay Conference in 2017. Shortly after joining the Sandusky Bay Conference, Shelby joined the Mid Ohio Athletic Conference in 2018.

== Ohio High School Athletic Association State Championships ==
- Boys Track and Field – 2003, 2004, 2019
- Boys Cross Country – 1979
- Boys Golf – 1980
- Girls Basketball – 1983
- Girls Track and Field – 2003

== History ==
The original Central School was dedicated in 1875 in downtown Shelby in the Central Park area. Later Shelby Central High School was built as an addition to Central School in 1901 which faced East Main on the corner of Main and High School Avenue. That building was later replaced by the new Shelby High School built in the years 1924-1925 which was behind Central High School at the end of Park Avenue along the three-way intersection of Park Ave, Mack Ave, and High School Ave. That building was added onto in 1938, 1951, and 1969. This building has since been demolished in September/October 2013 and the land will serve as a parking lot after the land has been cleared. Demolition began with the 1951 music/shop wing progressed to the 1969/1938 additions and was completed by razing the original 1924 building. The old Central High School was later demolished in 1950 and replaced by the current Central Elementary School built in the same year.

In 1965 Shelby Senior High School was built on W. Smiley Ave. located next to Sunset Dr. and the land that would become the Shelby YMCA. When the present school was built, the old school bell from the 1875 Central High was installed near the front entrance to the senior high. At that time the 1924 Shelby High School was turned into a junior high school housing grades 7-9 from 1965-1970 and grades 7-8 from 1970-2013. At the beginning of the 1995-1996 school year, the building became Shelby Middle School.

In 2010, a $24 million bond to build a new high school was passed by local voters. Efforts were made more rigorously after an initial bond was voted down. Teachers, staff, and students took to the community to discuss the poor conditions of the aging buildings, presenting water from pipes that sat overnight, discussed the lack of air conditioning, and the overcrowding of the buildings that were initially designed when Shelby’s population was closer to a village. The bond passed on the second attempt and construction began in fall of 2011. Construction of the new Shelby High School was completed 2 days before the 2013-2014 school year began. The Shelby Middle School moved into the 1965 school, housing grades six through eight. The new school is equipped with various new technologies that the previous building was incapable of housing. The new building also has a separate auxiliary gym housed behind the main gym in a separate building. With the loss of the 1924 structure and theater, a new 764-seat theater was built in the new school to replace it.

== Yearbook ==
The Shelby High School Yearbook began in 1913 under the leadership of noted author, Dawn Powell. A literary pamphlet called The Tatler was produced in 1913. In 1914 a full size yearbook by the same name was published with Dawn Powell serving as Editor in Chief. No yearbook was published from 1915-1926. In 1927 the Scarlet S began publication which ran through 1930. From 1931-1945 smaller "Memory Books" were produced containing only senior pictures and a few group pictures. These were vellum covered booklets and are hard to find today. The Scarlet S was revived in 1946 and has since been published annually. For over 20 years, it has been the tradition of the yearbook staff to produce a "Red and Gray" book at least once every four years so that every student has at least one book in the school colors over their four years at Shelby High School.

Since 1980, each book has had a theme, around which the color scheme, layout and design, and content are focused.

Themes:

2013 - Leaving Our Mark

2012 - It's What We Are
2011 - Elements
2010 - My Time
2009 - Seen, Heard, Noted, Quoted
2008 - Coloring Outside the Lines
2007 - Anatomy of a Whippet
2006 - Coming into Focus
2005 - Fragments Captured As One
2004 - Conquer the Fire
2003 - What About Us
2002 - Now It's Our Turn
2001 - Looking Forward 2 Looking Back
2000 - Stepping into the Millennium
1999 - Going Out With A Bang
1998 - Capturing The Moment
1992 - Going Against the Grain
1991 - Outta Control
1990 - In With The New
1989 - Out with the Old
1985 - Let the Good Times Roll
1984 - Scarlet "S" 1984
1983 - Whip It Into Action
1982 - These Are the Best of Times
1981 - Is That All There Is...
1980 - Crusin' 80

A former tradition was to dedicate the book to a notable faculty member.
Dedications:

1963 - Mr. Emile John, Mathematics teacher
1960 - Miss Harryet Snyder, Biology teacher
1958 - Mr. Dwight Sommerville, Band teacher
1957 - Mr. Robert Lafferty, Superintendent; In memory of Miss Leah Summer
1952 - J.E. McCollough, Principal and Superintendent

The Scarlet S has been advised by several faculty members over the years
Advisers:
Melissa Snively (2013–present)
Amanda Mahon (2008-2012)
Kathy Snyder (1998-2007)
Anita Ream (1986-1997)
Roy Garvin Royal Allard

== Whippet Theatre ==
The Whippet Theatre is a very active group of students involved in musical theater. Whippet Theater hosts a winter and spring show held in the new Shelby High School Performing Arts Center. In previous years it was tradition to hold a fall performance in the 1925 Shelby High School (Shelby Middle School) Auditorium with a performance in the spring held at the 1965 Shelby Senior High School's (current Shelby Middle School) David A. Jones Little Theater.

== Shelby Whippet Band ==
The Shelby Whippet Band has been around since 1927 by Maurice Davis (Director 1927-1938). Russell Kroger took over in 1939 and was followed by Jack Luth in 1941. The modern era Shelby Whippet Band was formed in 1945 by Dwight Sommerville (Director 1945-1983). The band incorporated many synonymous elements during the 1950s such as "The Trot" and "The Shelby Line". These two elements are probably what most people will say they remember about the band. The Shelby Flag Corps were added in the 1970s under the direction of Lynn Love who continued to be the flag advisor until 2013. The Shelby Flag Corps was abolished in 2013 due to low participation. After the retirement of Dwight Sommerville in 1983, Jack Gray became the director and served until 2000. Jack Gray was followed by Lisa Baker, with associate/head marching director Bryan Day and Tim Mayer. The band continues the many great traditions of the past while moving ahead into the future.

== Athletic league affiliations ==
- 1944-2017: Northern Ohio League
- 2017-2018: Sandusky Bay Conference
- 2018–Present-: Mid-Ohio Athletic Conference
