= Martin & Newby =

Shop in Ipswich, England

Coordinates: 52.0550°N 1.1592°E

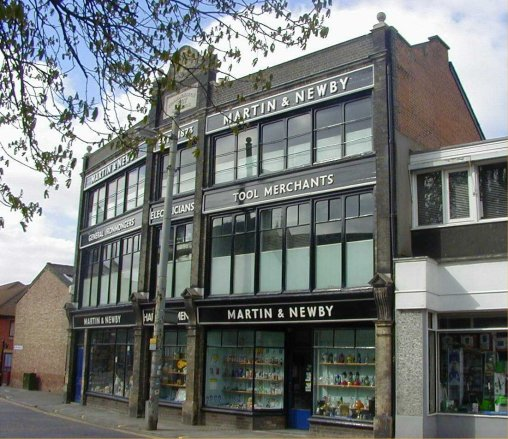
Martin & Newby building, 2007

Martin & Newby was the oldest shop in Ipswich, Suffolk until it closed down in June 2004. The business was established in Fore Street in 1873 and was based around 5 departments: Ironmongery, Electrical, Domestic, Gardening and Tools. The shop gave a very traditional personal service, it was reported by local press that the shop closed down because they could not compete with DIY Superstores such as B&Q and the increasing range of products offered by supermarkets.

The shop had worldwide attention when one of the world's oldest working light bulbs stopped working in 2001, the bulb was believed to be over 70 years old.

== History ==
The present Ironmongery Building was erected in 1897 on the site of the original shop founded by John Martin in 1873. This was known as "Birmingham House" and occupied an old timber-framed building of probable 17th century construction which was in a poor state of repair. He took on his nephew, Frederick Newby who ran the business after Martin died in 1885.

During the construction of the cellar of the 1897 building the workmen came across some stone foundations which were considered at the time to be the remains of the town's East Gate. However it is now thought that they were part of the Blackfriars Monastery precinct wall, the Monastery itself lying just to the South of the site. It became the Garden and Domestic departments of the new store.

The new building was called the "Commemoration Building 1897" referring to Queen Victoria's Diamond Jubilee. With the opening of the Commemoration Building in 1897 Birmingham House ceased to be part of the business and was not re-occupied until the early 1960s, by which time part of Birmingham House had become a well known local Newsagent called Fox's.

The Tool Department was situated in a former pub called The Bull's Head, which was the oldest property within the business and was timber framed. It was a "Tolly House" and became part of the shop in the late 1950s.

Finally the Electrical Department occupied a fine 3 storey Georgian Building with cellars, it had previously been owned by a fruit and vegetable wholesaler named Ellis. The building retained some period features such as a cooking range and copper in the cellar. To the rear of this building was a garden which was dug out in the 1960s to create the Car Park. The warehouse had also been owned and built by Ellis for storing his fruit and vegetables.

== See also ==
- Longest-lasting light bulbs
