= Adolphe Alexandre Chaillet =

French inventor

- Born: 15 July 1867; Paris, France
- Died: after 1914
- Occupations: Worked in the design department of General Electric of Bryan-Marsh Company (1892–1897), Technical Manager and a part of board in Shelby Electric Company (1897–1902)
- Spouse: Maude L. Bickmore (1877–?)
- Children: 3, Alexander B. Chaillet (November 1896), Arnold Chaillet Son (August 1898), Catherine Chaillet Daughter (January 1899).
- Parent: Samuel Alexander Chaillet – Eugénie Eva Wendawowicz

Adolphe Alexandre Chaillet (July 15, 1867, in Paris – after 1914) was a French inventor in the field of electrical engineering.

Chaillet created the Centennial Light, which has been illuminating a fire station in Livermore, California, for over a century. Chaillet was knowledgeable in chemistry and mineralogy.

== Early life ==
Adolphe A. Chaillet was born in Paris on July 15, 1867. He was the son of Samuel Alexander Chaillet, a Swedish watchmaker, and Eugénie Eva Wendawowicz, a Russian.

Chaillet was a graduate of both German and French scientific institutions. In addition to a thorough knowledge of electrical engineering, Chaillet was capable as a chemist and mineralogist. In a newspaper article, he commented on Darwin's theory of evolution.

Chaillet started in the incandescent lamp business with his father, who operated a factory near Paris. Chaillet was engaged by the Schaefer Company in Germany to assist in making filament lamps. He remodeled their plant and was later put in charge of the largest factory in Germany.

== Emigration and marriage ==
Chaillet emigrated to the United States in 1892 to manufacture lamps in Marlboro, Massachusetts (probably in what was then known as the Bryan-Marsh Company). Later, he was employed in the design department of the General Electric Company in Lynn, Massachusetts. About 1896, Chaillet completed a design for an electric locomotive for the Jeffrey Manufacturing Company of Columbus, Ohio.

Chaillet married Maude L. Bickmore (b. 1877) of Massachusetts. The couple had two sons—Alexander B. Chaillet (b. November 1896) and Arnold Chaillet (b. August 1898)—and a daughter—Catherine Chaillet (b. January 1899). All three children were born in Shelby, Ohio. (Note: A. A. Chaillet was living in Shelby in the year 1900 when the U. S. Census was taken. The census information regarding Chaillet was taken on June 18, 1900. It stated that Adolphe Chaillet was 32 years of age at that time, having been born in France in November of 1867. In 1900, he lived on Grand Boulevard, Shelby, Sharon Township, Richland County. The place of birth of Adolphe's mother was in Russia and his father's place of birth was in Sweden. It is stated that he had been married for five years. The wife of Adolphe was listed as Maud L., who, at that time, was 23 years of age, having been born in April, 1877. Her birthplace was in Massachusetts. Maud's mother and father were also born in Massachusetts. The Chaillet's three children were: Alexander B., born in November, 1896; Arnold, born in August, 1898; and, Catherine, five months old and born in January, 1899. The three children were born in Ohio. In actuality, a check at the Richland County Vital Records Office in Mansfield, Ohio, indicated that Catharine M. was born on December 28, 1899; her mother's maiden name was given as Maud Bickmore.)

== Shelby Electric Works ==
In the latter part of July, 1896, John Cooper Whiteside, former superintendent at the Cooper Engine Works in Mount Vernon, Ohio, mentioned to John Chamberlain Fish, a businessman in Shelby, Ohio, that Chaillet had an idea for an improved incandescent lamp that was 20% more efficient and had 30% more life than other models. This aroused the interest of Fish.

On August 7, 1896, a newspaper article announced that a contract had been negotiated between Chaillet, Whiteside, Fish and some other Shelby investors. Chaillet became technical manager and was named to the company board of directors.

"A. A. Chaillet, the technical manager of the company, and upon whom it chiefly depends for its advice regarding all points pertaining to the manufacturing of its product, was engaged in the factory operated by his father near Paris, France, when the incandescent lamp was made by them in Europe. The professor has been engaged as a manufacturer of incandescent lamps since 1878, having had charge of the laboratory of the largest factory in Germany. Mr. Chaillet came to this country in 1892 to manufacture lamps at Marlboro, Mass. He had been engaged in Germany by the Schaefer company to assist it in making filaments and remodeling its plant. This factory was closed by the Edison company shortly after Professor Chaillet had completed his work of remodeling. The professor was then engaged in the designing department of the General Electric company at Lynn, Mass., and has recently completed the design of an electric locomotive for the Jeffreys Manufacturing company of Columbus, Ohio. Professor Chaillet is not only an electrician of extensive experience and knowledge, but is a thorough chemist and mineralogist."

Chaillet was on the Board of Directors until their annual meeting on August 29, 1902, when he was not re-elected. (Note: Chaillet had two assistants. They were Joseph Hardwick, who had worked in the lamp department of the Thomson-Houston Electric Company and Charles F. Stilwell, the younger brother of Thomas Alva Edison's first wife, Mary. Hardwick also worked for the Universal Electric Company in Cleveland, Ohio, which dissolved in 1896.) Jas. Wormley & Co. had sole agency for the Shelby tipless lamp in Cook County, Illinois, and Minnesota from the first day of manufacture. In 1902, Wormley became a director of Shelby Electric.

Chaillet was granted only two U. S. Patents from 1896 to 1922, for a lamp socket and a light bulb; both were applied for while he was associated with Shelby Electric.

=== Improved incandescent light bulb ===
Chaillet's light-bulb design involved flattening the elliptically looped carbon filament coil set transversely to the longitudinal axis of the lamp, as well as flattening the end of the globe, or bulb at its tip end, parallel to the loops, so that the greatest intensity of light is thrown downward when the bulb is hung from the ceiling.

The Chaillet lamp was tested with others in January 1897. Manufacturing of the lamp started about February 1, 1897. The lamp was put on the market in March, 1897.

The original Chaillet lamp appeared in Electrical World on February 6, 1897. The complete details of the lamp design were not revealed in that article. It was a tipless lamp with a carbon filament that was manufactured using a secret process. Quoting directly from the article:

The lamp possesses a number of peculiar features which it is claimed give to it certain elements of superiority above all others. The filament is square cut by means of automatic machinery from sheets of material produced by a secret chemical process. The cut filament, after being formed, is attached to platinum terminals which are sealed into the sides at the lower end of the lamp bulb. The filament is of such high resistance that in the Shelby lamps it is shorter than that of most other commercial lamps of equal rating. The bulb is not exhausted from the top, which in connection with the exceedingly small filament used makes the completed lamp one of the smallest, also one of the neatest, lamps on the market.

In reality, it would have been difficult to prove conclusively that a new lamp design would perform in a superior manner to a competitive lamp that had a different filament configuration. The reason for making such a statement here is that while power input into a lamp could be easily measured, the light output had to have been measured in a spherical photometer. In the 1880s and 1890s, light output measurements were usually measured with a horizontal photometer. A horizontal measurement determines light output in only one direction rather than a total integrated value. Thus, while the Chaillet design might have been a better one relative to the competitive lamps it is not easy to conclude that now.

In an Electrical Review article of March 10, 1897, pg 111, the origin of Shelby light bulb filaments was discussed. Some manufacturers apparently thought that Shelby filaments were purchased in Europe. The Electrical Review telegraphed the Shelby Electric Company for the purpose of determining the truth about the origin of the filaments. The following are excerpts from Shelby's response:

The question of taking licenses to manufacture under the Westinghouse patents is one which we have not definitely decided....We have secured copies of the entire number of patents, which they claim to own or control, and we know positively that we do not want to infringe on any of them. We think that we are the only company manufacturing lamps in the United States to-day who can make such a statement. With reference to the filament which we use, we would say that we are using a square filament, not a cellulose filament. Our filament is not imported from Germany. We are manufacturing it here in Shelby, but it is the same filament which our Professor Chaillet discovered in Germany, and one that is most successfully being used by two of the most prominent lamp factories of Europe, by a special arrangement with our Professor Chaillet. The filament is much nearer pure carbon than anything on the market, it being so hard after being carbonized that it will scratch glass very readily....We could ourselves secure patents on over a hundred different devices, which we use in our manufacture, but prefer to keep them secret....We are not selling lamps on prices, but on quality....

At first, Chaillet did not patent the new lamp design, nor its details, preferring to keep them as trade secrets. Chaillet filed a patent application on October 22, 1900, which was granted on July 2, 1902.

== Later life ==
In 1902, Chaillet left the Shelby company board of directors. He later moved to Mexico City with his family. Chaillet worked at the lamps branch in Mexico City during the period from 1904 to 1914. In 1914, the Mexican Revolution forced Chaillet to return to the United States. (Note: According to the American Family Immigration History Center website, after August 1902, when Chaillet was no longer on the Board of Directors at Shelby, "A. A. Chaillet" is shown as having arrived at Ellis Island on July 5, 1914, on the ship Antonio Lopez, the port of departure being Puerto Mexico, Veracruz, Mexico; and Maude Chaillet and her daughter, Catharine, as having arrived at Ellis Island on July 15, 1904, aboard the ship Monterey, the port of departure being Veracruz Llave, Veracruz, Mexico. A. A. Chaillet's place of residence was listed as Mexico City. Therefore, it might be assumed, that Chaillet worked in Mexico City from about 1902 to 1914. Some corroboration of that conclusion follows from the text card that accompanies one of William J. Hammer's lamps that is now stored in the Henry Ford Museum in Dearborn, Michigan. Lamp No. 1905-798 is a Chaillet lamp that was manufactured in Mexico. There is the possibility that the turbulent nature of the Mexican Revolution made Mexico City a less-than-desirable place to live in 1914, the year Chaillet disembarked at Ellis Island.)

Chaillet died some time after 1914.
