= Christian Theological Seminary =

Seminary in Indianapolis, Indiana, US

Coordinates: 39.8329°N 86.1783°W

- Former name: Butler University School of Religion
- Type: Seminary
- Established: 1855
- Religious affiliation: Christian Church (Disciples of Christ)
- Endowment: $148.9 million (2025)
- President: David M. Mellott
- Students: 151
- Location: Indianapolis, Indiana, United States
- Campus: 12 acres (4.9 ha); Urban
- Website: www.cts.edu

Christian Theological Seminary is an ecumenical seminary related to the Christian Church (Disciples of Christ) and located in Indianapolis, Indiana, United States. It provides five degree-level education courses, three dual-degree programs, a Doctor of Ministry (D.Min.) program, and a Ph.D. in African American Preaching and Sacred Rhetoric. As of 2019, the seminary had an enrollment of 139 students.

== History ==
CTS was founded by abolitionists as part of North Western Christian University in 1855. North Western Christian University became Butler University in 1877; in 1958, CTS became a freestanding institution. In 2017, Butler University purchased about 30 acres (12 ha) of the CTS campus; Butler renamed its new land Butler South. CTS retained approximately 12 acres (4.9 ha) on the west end of the parcel and holds a 100-year lease to space on the campus, including parts of the seminary, chapel, library, and counseling building. CTS continues as a freestanding institution on the Butler campus.

== Academics ==
Christian Theological Seminary offers nine graduate degree programs and eight certificate programs, including: Masters of Divinity (MDiv), Masters of Theological Studies (MTS), Doctor of Ministry (DMin), Doctorate of Philosophy (PhD) in African American Preaching and Sacred Rhetoric, Master of Arts in Clinical Mental Health Counseling (MACMHC), Master of Arts in Marriage + Family Therapy (MAMFT), and three joint degree programs.

== Campus ==
Christian Theological Seminary is located on the campus of Butler University in Indianapolis within walking distance of the Indianapolis Museum of Art. The main building, a mid-century "pre-Gothic" building designed by Edward Larrabee Barnes that opened in 1966 and two historic mansions on the campus were purchased by Butler University in 2018. The CTS campus is housed in the North and West wings of the main seminary building, and the CTS Counseling Center is housed in the largest of the two historic mansions on the Southwest side of the campus. CTS is also home to the Lilly Endowment Clergy Renewal Program and the Faith & Action Project.

In 2021, a six-person panel of American Institute of Architects (AIA) Indianapolis members identified the seminary's Sweeney Chapel (1966) among the ten most "architecturally significant" buildings completed in the city since World War II.

== Library ==
The Christian Theological Seminary Library contains more than 210,000 volumes as well as over 1,300 current periodical subscriptions. Microfilms, audio-visuals, manuscripts, and special materials on the Restoration movement are available to scholars. The CTS Library is also home to the Congregational Resource Center, a resource library that contains videos, curriculum, denominational resources, and Vacation Bible School resources that are available on loan to pastors and leaders of local congregations. The CTS library also houses the Writing Center.

== Notable alumni ==
- Harold Good
- Robert W. Funk
- Joe Hogsett, Mayor of Indianapolis, former U.S. Attorney
- Dr. Joel C. Hunter
