= Shelby, Ohio =

- City
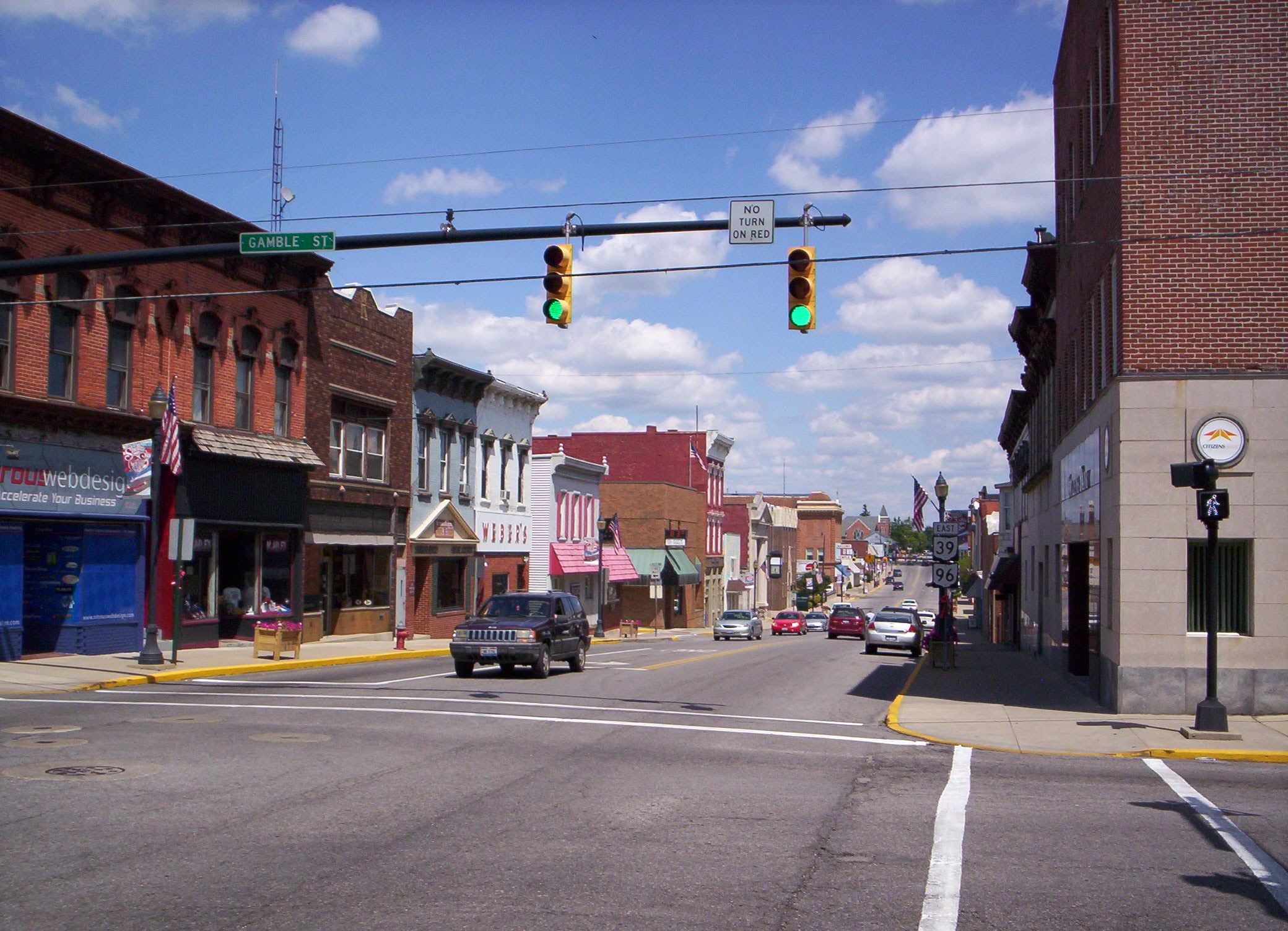
- West Main Street in downtown Shelby looking east at the intersection of Gamble Street.

- Flag Logo

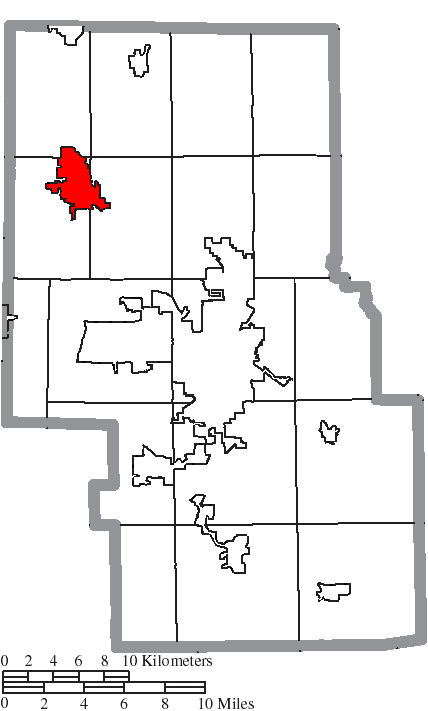
- Location of Shelby in Richland County

- Location within Ohio Location within the United States
- Coordinates: 40°52′45″N 82°39′14″W
- Country: United States
- State: Ohio
- County: Richland
- Founded: 1834
- Incorporated: 1853 (village)
- -: 1921 (city)

Area
  - Total: 6.46 sq mi (16.72 km^{2})
  - Land: 6.31 sq mi (16.35 km^{2})
  - Water: 0.14 sq mi (0.37 km^{2})
- Elevation: 1,083 ft (330 m)

Population (2020)
  - Total: 9,282
  - Density: 1,470.5/sq mi (567.75/km^{2})
- Time zone: UTC-5 (Eastern (EST))
  - Summer (DST): UTC-4 (EDT)
- ZIP code: 44875
- Area code: 419
- FIPS code: 39-72102
- GNIS feature ID: 2395862
- Website: shelbycity.oh.gov

Shelby is a city in Richland County, Ohio, United States. Located northwest of the city of Mansfield, it is part of the Mansfield metropolitan area. The population was 9,282 at the 2020 census.

== History ==
Shelby was originally called Gamble's Mills, and under the latter name was platted in 1834.

=== 2019 tornado ===
On April 14, 2019, Shelby was struck by a long tracked EF2 Tornado with winds of 120-125 MPH. At its peak, the tornado was a half mile wide. The tornado damaged more than half a dozen homes, as well as a car dealership on the south of side of Shelby.

=== Downtown revitalization ===
Shelby has undertaken a multi-phase downtown revitalization effort aimed at improving walkability, public gathering spaces, economic activity, and long-term historic preservation.

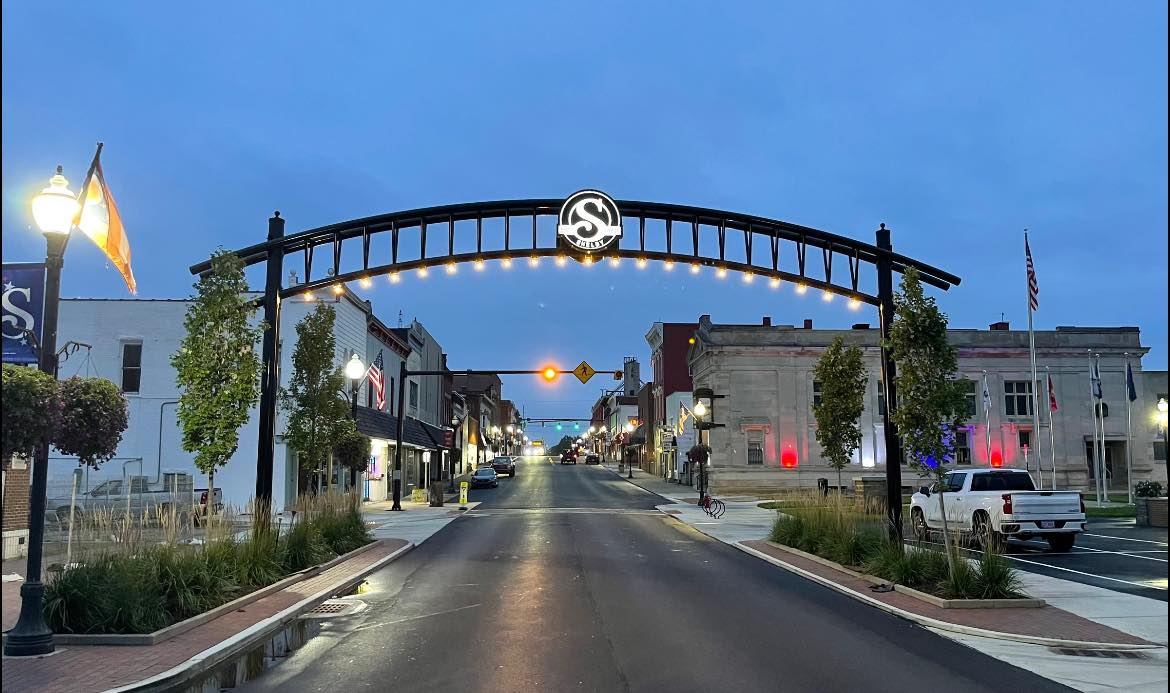

Phase I, completed as part of the community’s revitalization and placemaking plan, focused on a comprehensive streetscape improvement along Main Street. The project introduced new sidewalks, street trees, landscaped planters, decorative lighting, benches, improved pedestrian crossings, and upgraded infrastructure designed to enhance safety and support increased foot traffic in the business district.

Phase II involved the construction of Black Fork Commons Plaza, a central public space intended to anchor community events and serve as a year-round gathering point. The plaza includes a programmable splash fountain, café-style seating, shade structures, a seasonal fireplace, and a flexible pavilion space. Since opening, it has been used for festivals, concerts, markets, holiday programming, and civic events, becoming a focal point of downtown activity.

In addition to public investment, the Shelby Foundation has initiated significant philanthropic efforts to support the continued revitalization of the downtown core. The Foundation is investing in the restoration and redevelopment of multiple downtown buildings, with an emphasis on preserving historic structures, expanding commercial and community space, and aligning private improvements with the city’s broader revitalization strategy.

Together, these initiatives represent a coordinated effort by the City of Shelby, the Community Improvement Corporation, and local philanthropic partners to strengthen the downtown district as a commercial, cultural, and community hub.

== Geography ==
According to the United States Census Bureau, the city has a total area of 6.49 square miles (16.81 km^{2}), of which 6.35 square miles (16.45 km^{2}) is land and 0.14 square miles (0.36 km^{2}) is water. Much of the water area consists of the Black Fork of the Mohican River, which flows through downtown; its location makes the city vulnerable to floods.

== Demographics ==
Historical population
Census	Pop.	Note	%±
1860	1,003		—
1870	1,807		80.2%
1880	1,871		3.5%
1890	1,977		5.7%
1900	4,685		137.0%
1910	4,903		4.7%
1920	5,578		13.8%
1930	6,198		11.1%
1940	6,643		7.2%
1950	7,971		20.0%
1960	9,106		14.2%
1970	9,847		8.1%
1980	9,643		−2.1%
1990	9,564		−0.8%
2000	9,821		2.7%
2010	9,317		−5.1%
2020	9,282		−0.4%
2025 (est.)	9,231		−0.5%

=== 2020 census ===
As of the 2020 census, Shelby had a population of 9,282. The median age was 40.8 years. 23.4% of residents were under the age of 18 and 21.1% of residents were 65 years of age or older. For every 100 females there were 91.5 males, and for every 100 females age 18 and over there were 87.9 males age 18 and over.

99.4% of residents lived in urban areas, while 0.6% lived in rural areas.

There were 3,978 households in Shelby, of which 28.5% had children under the age of 18 living in them. Of all households, 42.8% were married-couple households, 18.5% were households with a male householder and no spouse or partner present, and 30.7% were households with a female householder and no spouse or partner present. About 33.7% of all households were made up of individuals and 14.9% had someone living alone who was 65 years of age or older.

There were 4,338 housing units, of which 8.3% were vacant. The homeowner vacancy rate was 1.4% and the rental vacancy rate was 11.2%.

Racial composition as of the 2020 census
Race	Number	Percent
White	8,767	94.5%
Black or African American	51	0.5%
American Indian and Alaska Native	9	0.1%
Asian	38	0.4%
Native Hawaiian and Other Pacific Islander	3	0.0%
Some other race	68	0.7%
Two or more races	346	3.7%
Hispanic or Latino (of any race)	216	2.3%

=== 2010 census ===
As of the census of 2010, there were 9,317 people, 3,911 households, and 2,510 families residing in the city. The population density was 1,467.2 inhabitants per square mile (566.5/km^{2}). There were 4,354 housing units at an average density of 685.7 per square mile (264.8/km^{2}). The racial makeup of the city was 98.2% White, 0.2% African American, 0.2% Native American, 0.3% Asian, 0.2% from other races, and 1.0% from two or more races. Hispanic or Latino of any race were 1.2% of the population.

There were 3,911 households, of which 31.3% had children under the age of 18 living with them, 47.5% were married couples living together, 12.7% had a female householder with no husband present, 4.0% had a male householder with no wife present, and 35.8% were non-families. 31.3% of all households were made up of individuals, and 14.1% had someone living alone who was 65 years of age or older. The average household size was 2.34 and the average family size was 2.91.

The median age in the city was 40.1 years. 24.5% of residents were under the age of 18; 8% were between the ages of 18 and 24; 24.2% were from 25 to 44; 25.6% were from 45 to 64; and 17.6% were 65 years of age or older. The gender makeup of the city was 47.0% male and 53.0% female.

=== 2000 census ===
As of the census of 2000, there were 9,821 people, 4,073 households, and 2,667 families residing in the city. The population density was 1,949.3 inhabitants per square mile (752.6/km^{2}). There were 4,330 housing units at an average density of 859.4 per square mile (331.8/km^{2}). The racial makeup of the city was 98.40% White, 0.14% African American, 0.18% Native American, 0.35% Asian, 0.37% from other races, and 0.56% from two or more races. Hispanic or Latino of any race were 1.02% of the population.

There were 4,073 households, out of which 31.6% had children under the age of 18 living with them, 52.1% were married couples living together, 10.0% had a female householder with no husband present, and 34.5% were non-families. 30.8% of all households were made up of individuals, and 14.3% had someone living alone who was 65 years of age or older. The average household size was 2.38 and the average family size was 2.97.

In the city the population was spread out, with 25.7% under the age of 18, 8.6% from 18 to 24, 26.8% from 25 to 44, 22.6% from 45 to 64, and 16.3% who were 65 years of age or older. The median age was 37 years. For every 100 females, there were 91.4 males. For every 100 females age 18 and over, there were 85.1 males.

The median income for a household in the city was $35,938, and the median income for a family was $43,373. Males had a median income of $32,551 versus $21,573 for females. The per capita income for the city was $17,096. About 7.4% of families and 10.2% of the population were below the poverty line, including 16.1% of those under age 18 and 7.4% of those age 65 or over.

== Parks ==
The city of Shelby has five parks which are operated and maintained by the city of Shelby Parks Department.

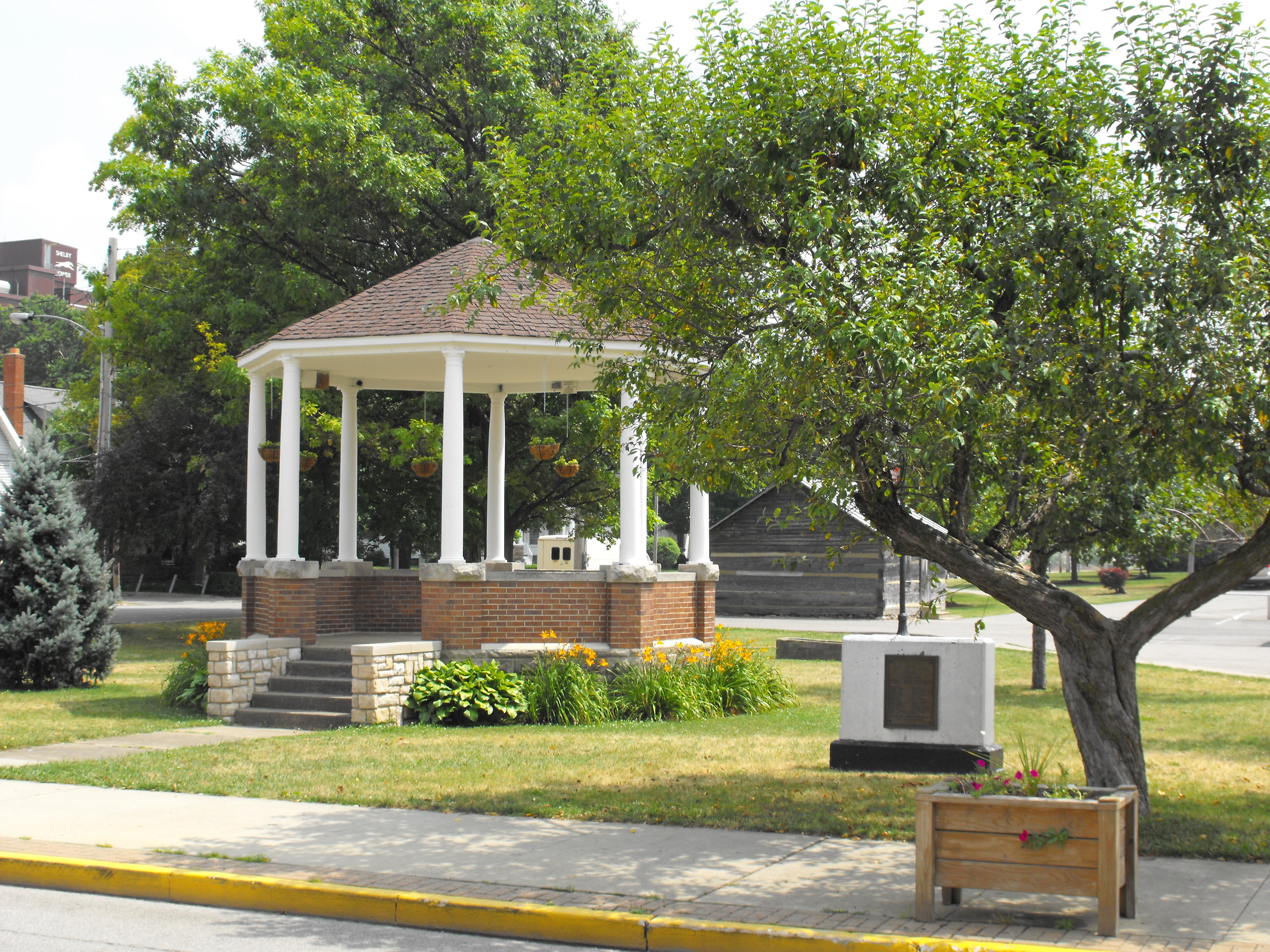
Shelby Central Park

The city’s largest recreation area, Seltzer Park, includes a public swimming pool, playground areas, picnic shelters, athletic fields, and access to the nearby Black Fork of the Mohican River. The park is a central gathering place for family activities, youth sports, and seasonal programming.

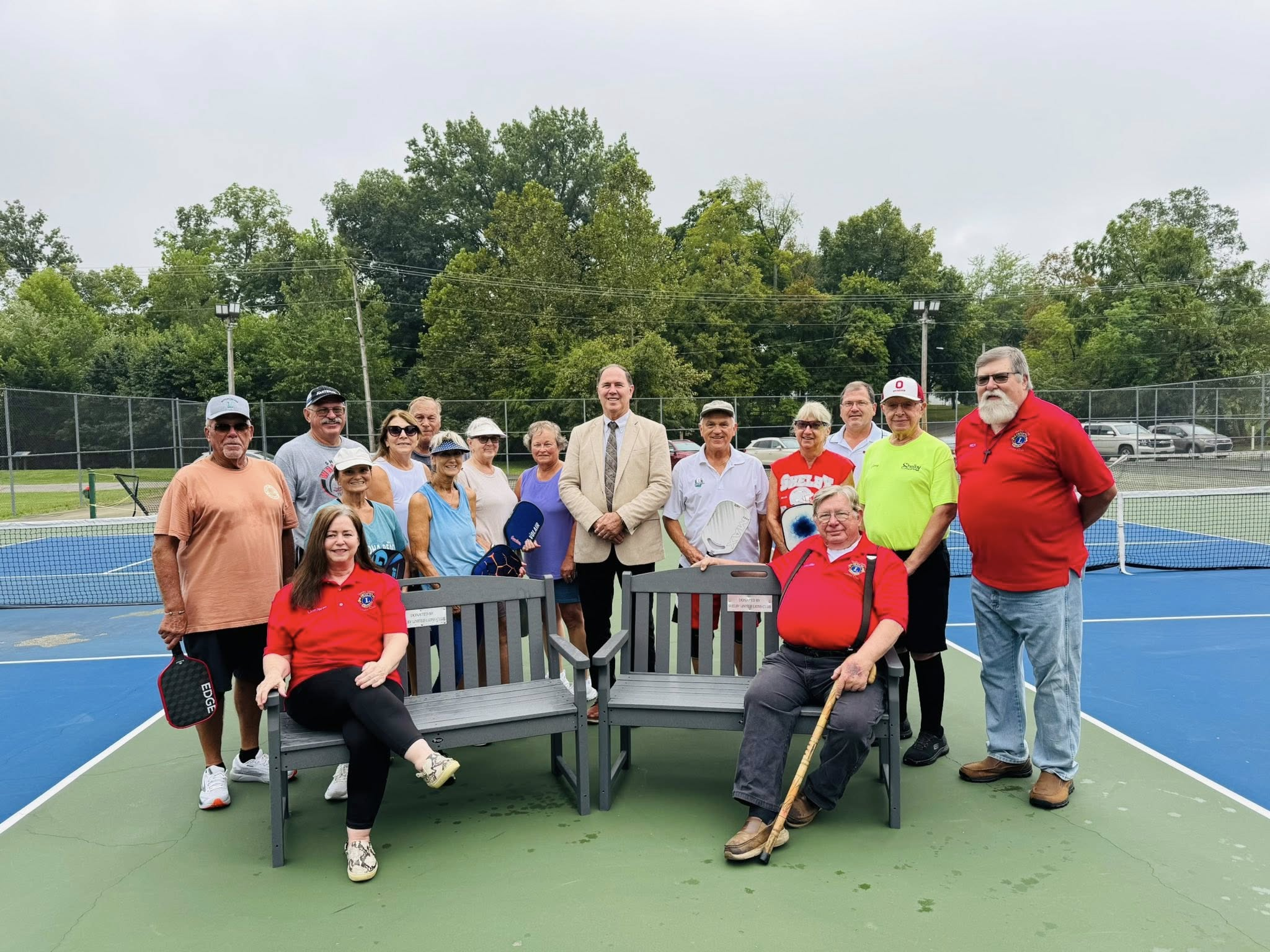

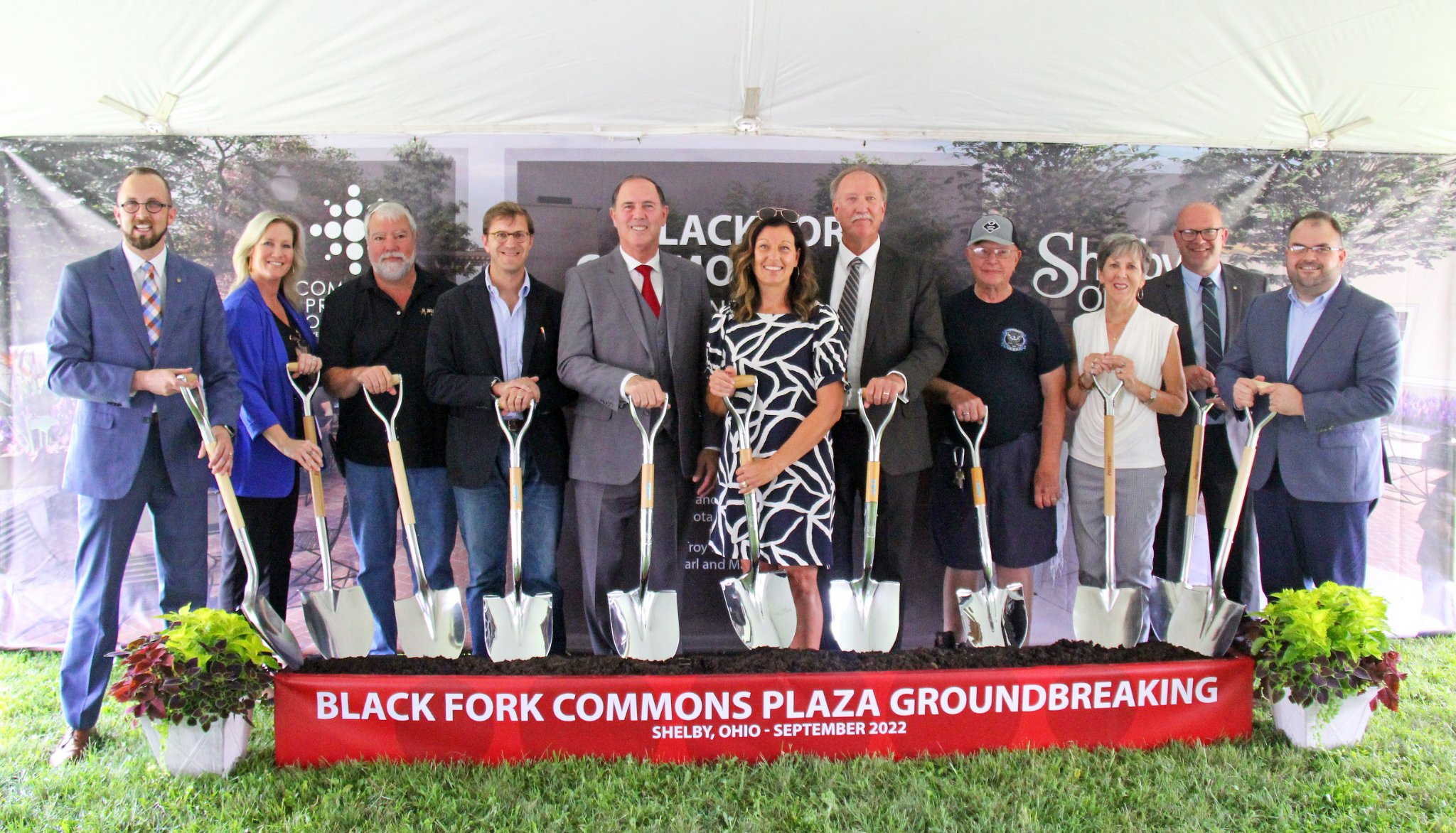

A newer addition to Shelby’s public spaces, Black Fork Commons Plaza, serves as a focal point of the city’s downtown revitalization efforts. The plaza includes a programmable splash fountain, shaded seating, a seasonal fireplace, a pavilion structure, and café-style gathering areas designed for year-round use. The space regularly hosts festivals, concerts, holiday events, and community activities, contributing to Shelby’s growing emphasis on placemaking and downtown vibrancy.

== Library ==
The sole library in the city of Shelby is Marvin Memorial Library. Marvin Library offers Story Time and summer reading programs for youth, a Teen Cafe for teenagers and the Adult Book Club for adults. Community meeting rooms and computer access are also offered through the library.

Marvin Library is named for Daniel Marvin, a veteran of the American Civil War, and son of Stephen and Sarah (Burr) Marvin who built the first frame house in Shelby. He studied law, went to California during the gold rush, then returned to Ohio by the outbreak of the Civil War, during which he participated in the battles of Shiloh & Stone River, and was severely wounded. Marvin practiced law for many years. He purchased the house on West Whitney Avenue for $6,500 and presented it to the city in the early 1900s. His generosity to the city was greatly appreciated and memorialized in the name of the library.

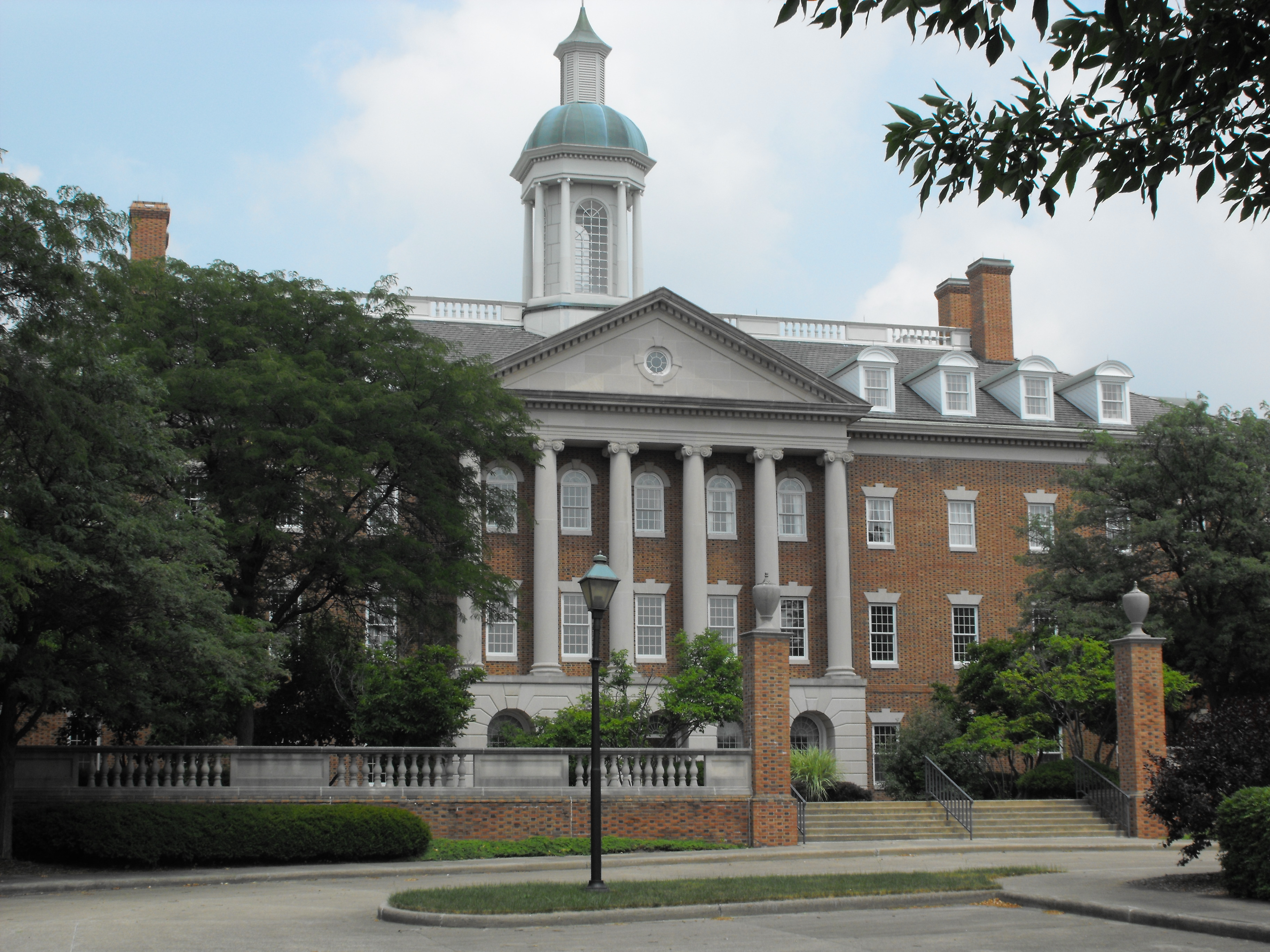
North Central State College Kehoe Center

== Education ==
Shelby is served by the Shelby City School District, which operates a modern, consolidated campus for students from preschool through grade 12.

Shelby High School opened in 2013, replacing the district’s former high school building and incorporating updated classroom technology, science labs, fine arts spaces, and expanded academic facilities. The building was designed to support project-based learning, STEM instruction, and career-readiness programming for the district’s students.

In 2020, the district opened a new PK–8 building, bringing together previously separate elementary and middle school facilities into one unified campus. The building includes dedicated early-childhood classrooms, age-specific learning wings, collaborative learning areas, updated performing arts and music spaces, and secure entrances designed to meet modern safety standards.

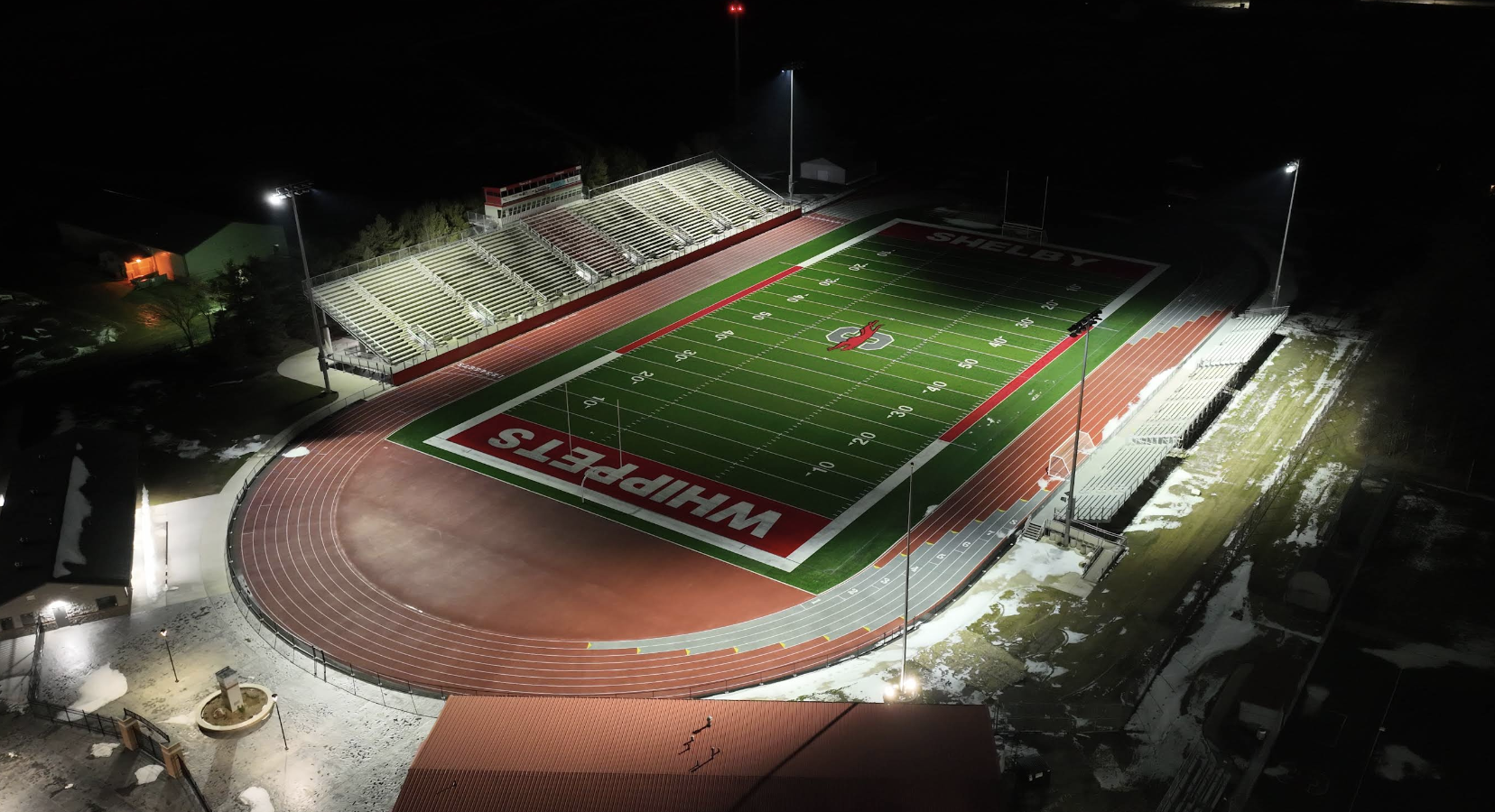

The school district also operates the Whippet Athletic Complex, a comprehensive outdoor sports facility that includes a multi-use stadium, turf football and soccer field, eight-lane track, baseball and softball fields, tennis courts, and practice areas. The complex hosts high school and middle school athletics as well as community activities and youth sports.

These investments represent a significant modernization of the district’s educational and athletic infrastructure, supporting academic growth, extracurricular programs, and community engagement within Shelby.

== Notable people ==
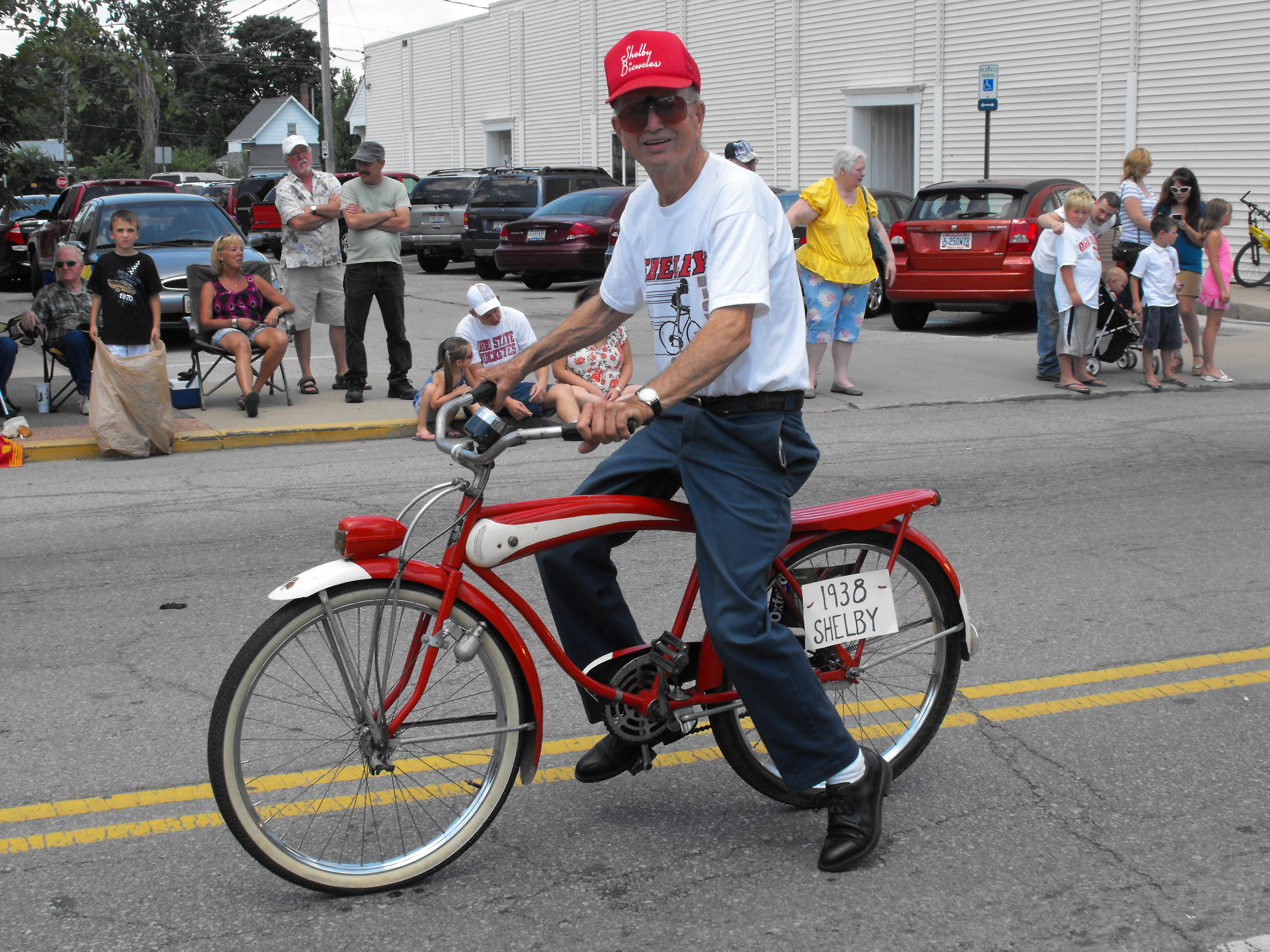
Shelby Bicycle Days

- Charles Follis, the first black professional football player, played for the Shelby Blues Football team.
- Larry L. Hench, emeritus professor at the University of Florida and chair of the Ceramic Materials Department at Imperial College London
- Joel Hunter, retired pastor of Northland Community Church, Casselberry, FL
- Dawn Powell, a writer from the 20th century, lived in Shelby for a period of time.
- Larry Siegfried, professional basketball player who played for Boston Celtics and earlier for the Ohio State Buckeyes. Lived in Shelby.
- William W. Skiles, a U.S. congressman. The football field is named after him.
- Paul Bearer, The iconic manager of The Undertaker

== See also ==
Shelby Cycle Company was a bicycle manufacturer formerly located in Shelby. The Shelby Bicycle Days Festival takes place in early July in downtown Shelby.

The Centennial Light, the world's oldest functioning lightbulb, was manufactured in Shelby by the Shelby Electric Company in the 1890s.
